= Lusya Chebotina =

Russian singer-songwriter (born 1997)

Lusya Chebotina Люся Чеботина
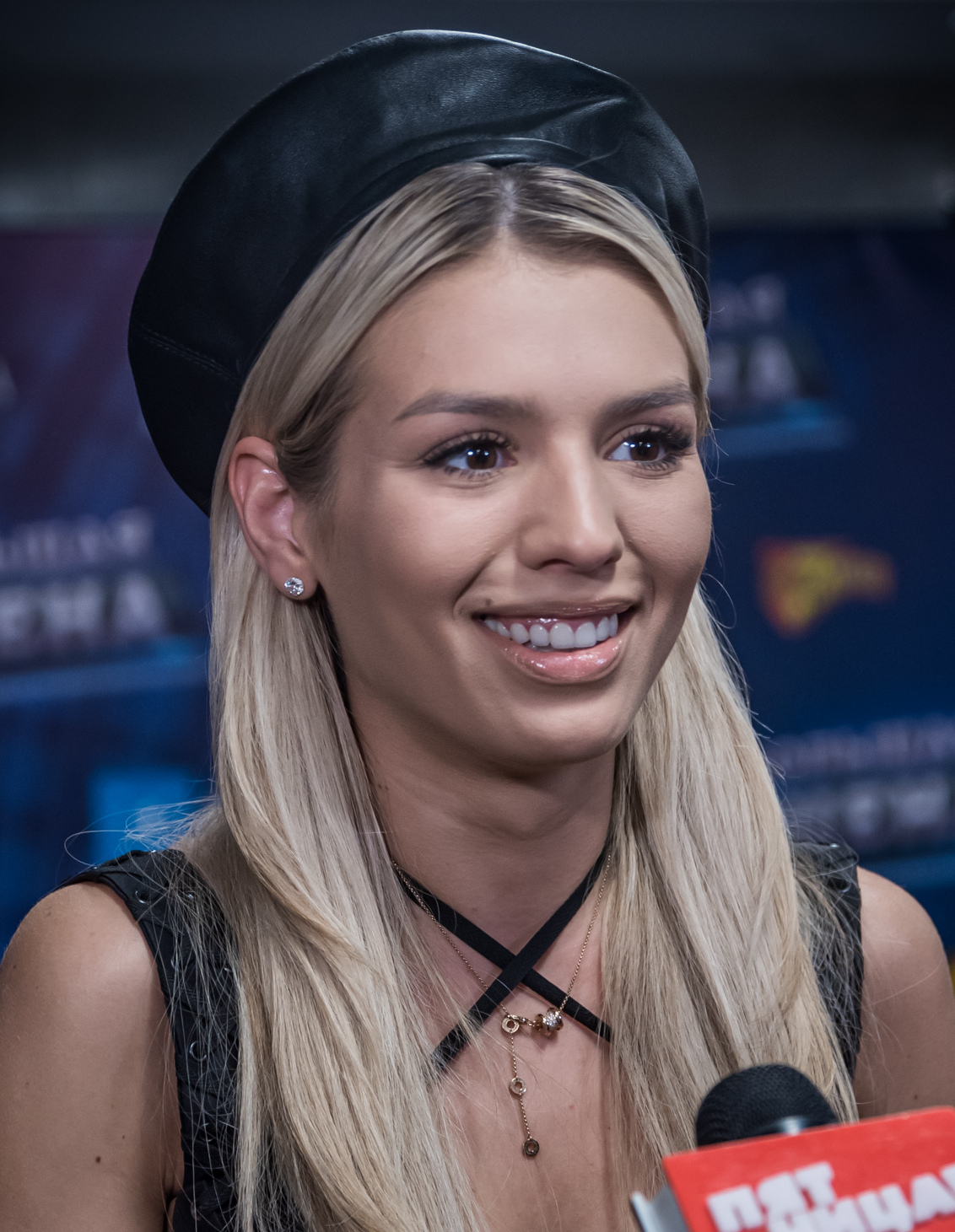
- Chebotina in 2022

Background information
- Born: Lyudmila Andreyevna Chebotina; 26 April 1997 (age 29); Petropavlovsk-Kamchatsky, Russia
- Genre: Pop
- Occupations: Singer; songwriter; influencer; actress
- Instrument: Vocals
- Years active: 2015–present
- Label: RockFam
- Partner(s): UrKiss (2022–2023); Mathias Normann (2024)
- Website: lusia-chebotina.com
- Awards: Full list

Lyudmila Andreyevna Chebotina (Russian: Людмила Андреевна Чеботина; born 26 April 1997), known professionally as Lusya Chebotina (Russian: Люся Чеботина) is a Russian singer, songwriter, influencer, actress and media personality.

She became known in Russia in 2021 after releasing song titled "Solnce Monako". Chebotina's other most successful singles includes "Plakal Hollivud" (2022), "Sekret na dvoikh" (2022), "Luchshaya podruga" (2023) and "Za byvshego" (2024).

== Early life and career ==
Lyudmila Andreyevna Chebotina was born on 26 April 1997 in Petropavlovsk-Kamchatsky. Her mother is an accountant. When she was six, her parents divorced and she soon moved with her mother to Moscow.In 2016 Chebotina graduated from the State Musical College of Pop and Jazz Art and has a diploma of a pedagogue in pop and jazz vocals.

In 2015, she participated in the fifth season of Holos Krainy, the Ukrainian version of television singing competition The Voice, where she reached the quarter-finals. Chebotina the same year also took part in the first season of Glavnaya Stsena, the Russian version of talent show The X Factor. In 2017, she took part in the Indian Hindi reality singing talent show Dil Hai Hindustani.

In 2017, she was one of the six Russian representatives at international contest New Wave in Sochi.

In 2019, she was nominated at Premiya RU.TV 2019 awards show in category Best start. On 11 October 2019, she released her debut studio album Bezlimitnaya lyubov'.

In 2020, she was one of the special guests performers in the Vypusknoj event, hosted by Muz-TV.

On 29 October 2021, she released her second studio album The End. The album includes the single "Solnce Monako", which earned Chebotina's first entry into the Lithuanian Singlų Top 100, peak at #3 in the Russian Billboard chart, first entry into the top ten of the Ukrainian airplay chart, and entry into the charts of three additional airplays of former Soviet republics – Belarus, Kazakhstan and Moldova, as well as a Russian National Music Award for the song of the year.

At the annual awards organised by RU.TV, held on 28 May 2022, the singer triumphed in the category of the best debut.

On 3 November 2023, she released her third studio album Pervaya ledi.

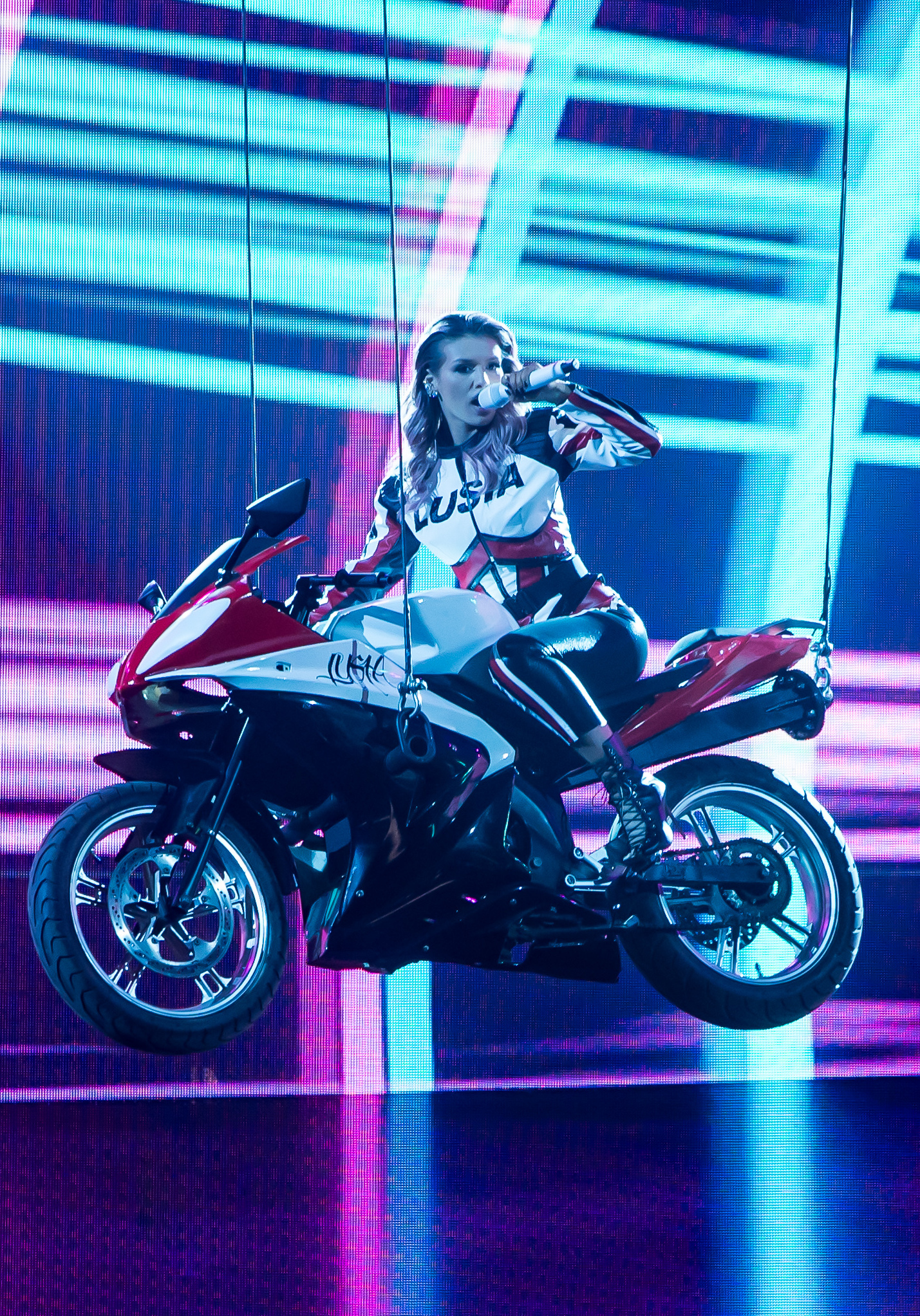
Lusya Chebotina performing "Za byvshego" at Russian National Music Award show (2025)

In 2024, she finished at third place in the fifth season of Maska, the Russian version of Masked Singer.

== Personal life ==
Chebotina currently resides in Moscow, Russia and is an owner of several properties in Dubai, United Arab Emirates.

She has an older sister named Elizaveta.

From November 2022 to February 2023 she was in a relationship with Russian singer UrKiss, son of the musical magnat Vladimir Kiselev and television presenter Elena Sever. In August 2024 Lusya confirmed being in a relationship with Norwegian footballer Mathias Normann. In February 2025, in an Valentine's Day interview, she suggested that she was no longer in a relationship with Normann.

She declared herself as a fan of the football club FC Dynamo Moscow.

== Discography ==
=== Studio albums ===
List of studio albums, with selected details
Title	Details
Bezlimitnaya lyubov'	Released: 11 October 2019; Label: Zhara Music; Format: Digital download, streaming
The End	Released: 29 October 2021; Label: RockFam; Format: Digital download, streaming
Pervaya ledi	Released: 3 November 2023; Label: Rocket Records, Black Star; Format: Digital download, streaming

=== Singles ===
==== As lead artist: 2017–2021 ====
List of singles released from 2017 to 2021 as lead artist, showing year released, chart positions and album name
Title	Year	Peak chart positions			Album or EP
Title	Year	RUS Air.	CIS Air.	LTU Air.	Album or EP
"Pina Kolada"	2017	—	—	*	Non-album singles
"Ty prosto svo"	2017	—	—	*	Non-album singles
"Soblazn"	2018	—	—	*	Non-album singles
"Stat' svobodnoy" (with Yan Space)	2018	—	—	*	Non-album singles
"Davayte vspomnim vsekh" (with Andrei Reznikov)	2018	—	—	*	Non-album singles
"Habibi" (with Yan Space)	2018	—	—	*	Non-album singles
"No Cry" (with Luxor)	2018	67	76	*	Non-album singles
"Leto-Zhara" (with Stas More)	2018	—	—	*	Non-album singles
"Mimoza"	2018	—	—	*	Non-album singles
"Plokhaya devchonka"	2018	—	—	*	Non-album singles
"Zaberi menya domoy" (with DJ Daveed)	2018	—	—	*	Non-album singles
"Dva vystrela"	2018	82	96	*	Non-album singles
"Noch'yu i dnëm"	2018	—	—	*	Non-album singles
"Ocharovana toboy"	2019	—	—	*	Non-album singles
"Zamorochila"	2019	—	—	*	Non-album singles
"Bud' smeley" (with UrKiss)	2019	76	92	*	Epilog
"Bezlimitnaya lyubov'"	2019	—	—	*	Bezlimitnaya lyubov'
"Mama znayet"	2019	—	—	*	Non-album singles
"Den'gi"	2020	—	—	*	Non-album singles
"Coming Out"	2020	—	—	*	Non-album singles
"Unison" (with Dmitry Malikov)	2020	—	—	*	Non-album singles
"Smelo"	2020	—	—	*	Non-album singles
"Mama, kak byt'?"	2020	—	—	*	Non-album singles
"Soulmate"	2020	—	—	*	Non-album singles
"Ne lay"	2020	—	—	*	Non-album singles
"Pis'mo Sante"	2020	—	—	*	Non-album singles
"Oh-Oh"	2021	—	—	*	Non-album singles
"Zabyvayu" (with Nikita Kiosse)	2021	—	—	*	Non-album singles
"Don"	2021	—	—	*	Non-album singles
"Nebo" (with Anita Tsoy)	2021	—	—	*	Non-album singles
"Mame"	2021	—	—	*	Non-album singles
"Pososyomsya" (with Yakimo and DJ Daveed)	2021	—	—	*	Non-album singles
"Kh'yuston"	2021	—	—	*	Non-album singles
"Your Love" (with Arut and Haart)	2021	—	—	*	Non-album singles
"Trend"	2021	—	—	174	Non-album singles
"Zapomni"	2021	—	—	*	Non-album singles
"Pis'mo Sante 2"	2021	—	—	*	Non-album singles
"—" denotes items which were not released in that country or failed to chart. "*" denotes that the chart did not exist at that time.

==== As lead artist: since 2022 ====
List of singles released since 2022 as lead artist, showing year released, chart positions and album name
Title	Year	Peak chart positions									Album
Title	Year	RUS Air.	RUS Stream.	BLR Air.	CIS Air.	EST Air.	KAZ Air.	LAT Air. (Note: Since only two singles of Chebotina peaked at LaIPA Airplay chart, while multiple songs of her peaked on TopHit, also this chart is taken into consideration as a Latvian Airplay Chart.)	LTU Air.	MDA Air.	Album
"Aeroekspress"	2022	—	*	*	—	*			*	*	Non-album singles
"Trigger"	2022	—	*	*	—	*			*	*	Non-album singles
"June Song"	2022	—	*	*	—	*			*	*	Non-album singles
"Plakal Hollivud"	2022	20	*	31	26	60	4	9	*	1	Non-album singles
"Sekret na dvoikh" (with Dima Bilan)	2022	11	*	45	18	37	43	4	*	6	Non-album singles
"Zvuchish' vo mne" (with UrKiss)	2022	—	*	*	—	*	*	*	*	*	Non-album singles
"Siniy veter – Belyy lyon" (with Igor Nikolayev)	2022	—	*	*	—	34	*	8	*	*	Luchshiye Khity
"Moye"	2023	37	*	101	60	35	—	13	6	2	Non-album singles
"Luchshaya podruga"	2023	62	*	197	101	22	58	2	15	41	Non-album singles
"Koroleva" (with Philipp Kirkorov)	2023	76	*	—	116	40	51	—	—	—	Non-album singles
"Tseluy menya"	2023	90	*	106	120	18	120	1	3	—	Non-album singles
"Abyuz"	2023	—	*	131	—	—	—	1	1	—	Pervaya ledi
"Psevdomodeli"	2023	—	*	—	—	—	—	12	—	—	Pervaya ledi
"Malysh"	2023	59	*	100	95	32	101	54	—	126	Pervaya ledi
"Master satiry"	2023	—	*	—	—	—	—	—	—	—	Pervaya ledi
"Odinochestvo moye" (featuring X-date)	2023	—	*	—	—	—	—	—	—	—	Non-album singles
"Komandir"	2024	82	*	—	133	107	123	67	20	—	Non-album singles
"Za byvshego"	2024	48	16	88	79	87	—	7	18	13	Non-album singles
"Poshlyu yego na"	2024	—	*	—	—	115	—	9	—	—	Non-album singles
"Dvoye odinochek" (featuring Stas Mikhaylov)	2024	—	*	—	—	—	—	—	—	—	Non-album singles
"Faraon"	2024	—	*	—	—	176	—	56	4	102	Non-album singles
"Moskva-Dubai"	2024	70	*	179	135	—	191	51	—	—	Non-album singles
"Kabluk"	2025	46	31	163	65	—	185	12	8	38	Non-album singles
"Welcome to Moscow"	2025	—	—	—	—	—	—	—	—	—	Non-album singles
"Po barabanu"	2025	73	61	—	106	—	4	50	1	40	Non-album singles
"Motiv prestupleniya"	2026	—	—	—	—	—	—	48	—	—	Non-album singles
"Obnimay" (with Stas Mikhaylov)	2026	118	—	—	181	—	—	—	—	—	Non-album singles
"Posledniy zvonok" (with Alex Lim and Igor Krutoy)	2026	—	—	—	—	—	—	—	—	—	Non-album singles
"Zelenyye glaza"	2026	122	—	—	168	—	—	33	—	—	Non-album singles
"Gorgona"	2026	19	—	103	23	—	60	39	—	—	Non-album singles
"OSHM" (with Leningrad)	2026	—	—	—	—	—	—	—	—	—	Non-album singles
"Napopolam"	2026	—	—	—	—	—	—	—	—	—	Non-album singles
"—" denotes items which were not released in that country or failed to chart. "*" denotes that the chart did not exist at that time.

==== As featured artist ====
List of singles as featured artist, showing year released, chart positions and album name
Title	Year	Peak chart positions	Album or EP
Title	Year	UKR Air.	Album or EP
"Son" (Doni featuring Lusya Chebotina)	2017	—	Non-album single
"Gde ty" (DJ Daveed featuring Lusya Chebotina)	2018	—	Dnevnikpamyati
"Randevu" (Doni featuring Lusya Chebotina)	2018	—	Non-album single
"Balzam" (Dan Balan featuring Lusya Chebotina)	2019	—	Freedom, Pt. 2
"Amneziya" (DJ Smash featuring Lusya Chebotina)	2019	—	Viva Amnesia
"Fak Yu" (Klava Koka featuring Lusya Chebotina)	2019	—	Non-album singles
"Diskonnekt" (Bahh Tee featuring Lusya Chebotina)	2020	—	Non-album singles
"Fly Away" (Burak Yeter featuring Emie, Lusya Chebotina and Everthe8)	2020	54	Non-album singles
"Miss You" (Burak Yeter featuring Lusia)	2026	—	Non-album singles
"—" denotes items which were not released in that country or failed to chart. "*" denotes that the chart did not exist at that time.

=== Promotional singles ===
List of promotional singles, showing year released, chart positions and album name
Title	Year	Peak chart positions				Album
Title	Year	RUS Air.	EST Air.	LAT Air.	LTU Air.	Album
"Glavnaya prichina"	2022	—	*			Desperate for Marriage (soundtrack)
"V nashem gorode leto" (with Yekaterina Sales and Emil Sales)	2023	—	—	—	—	Leto v gorode (soundtrack)
"Imperatritsa"	2023	184	49	56	9	Imperatritsy (soundtrack)
"Ty ne odin" (with Alexey Vorobyov)	2025	—	—	—	—	Bol'she, chem futbol (soundtrack)
"—" denotes items which were not released in that country or failed to chart. "*" denotes that the chart did not exist at that time.

=== Other charted songs ===
List of other charted songs, showing year released, chart positions and album name
Title	Year	Peak chart positions										Album
Title	Year	RUS BB	RUS Air.	BLR Air.	CIS Air.	EST Air.	KAZ Air.	LTU	LTU Air.	MDA Air.	UKR Air.	Album
"Solnce Monako"	2021	3	2	94	6	*	10	45	182	49	9	The End
"Kak ty khochesh'"	2023	*	—	199	—	55	—	—	6	—	—	Pervaya ledi
"—" denotes items which were not released in that country or failed to chart. "*" denotes that the chart did not exist at that time.

== Filmography ==
Year	Title	Role	Ref.
2019	Serf	Anfisa	
2022	Desperate for Marriage	Paraglider	
2022	Chestnyy razvod 2	Jury member	
2022	SamoIroniya sudby	A stewardess	
2023	Leto v gorode	Herself	
2023	Ivan Vasilyevich menyayet vsyo	ABBA lead singer	
2024	Podrostki v kosmose	Athena	
2024	Molot vedm	Aleskerka	
2025	Bolshe, chem futbol	Ritochka	
