= Paulina Andreeva =

Russian actress and singer

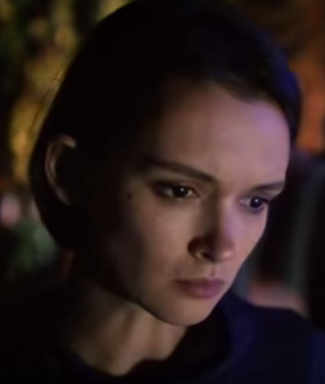
- Born: Ekaterina Olegovna Andreeva; 12 October 1988 (age 37); Leningrad, RSFSR, USSR
- Occupation: Actress
- Years active: 2013–present

Paulina Olegovna Andreeva (Russian: Паулина Олеговна Андреева; born 12 October 1988) is a Russian actress and screenwriter. Her notable acting roles have included the Russian television series The Method (2015-2021), and the Netflix science fiction production, Better than Us (2018–2019).

== Biography ==
Ekaterina "Paulina" Olegovna Andreeva was born in Leningrad (now known as Saint Petersburg), Russian SFSR, Soviet Union. She lived with her parents and two younger brothers on Vasilyevsky Island. She studied journalism for two years at the Saint Petersburg State University, before moving to Moscow, where she entered the Moscow Art Theatre School to study acting on courses under Roman Kozak and Dmitry Brusnikin, and joined the troupe of the Moscow Chekhov Theater.

== Personal life ==
In 2019, she married Fyodor Bondarchuk. In 2021, the couple gave birth to their son, Ivan. Bondarchuk and Andreeva divorced in March 2025.

== Career ==
Andreeva has been active as an actress since 2013. Her notable acting roles include the Russian television series The Method (debut, 2015), and The Thaw (2013).

She starred as the android in the Netflix science fiction production, Better than Us (2018–2019), alongside Kirill Käro and Aleksandr Ustyugov, which was the first Netflix Original from Russia.

Besides acting, Andreeva is also a screenwriter; she wrote the script of the drama series Psycho starring Konstantin Bogomolov and Actresses starring Svetlana Khodchenkova. Both projects were produced by Fyodor Bondarchuk.

Andreeva also has a singing career.

== Filmography ==
=== Film ===
Year	Title	Role	Notes	Citation
2013	The Dark World: Equilibrium	Lily, right hand sorcerer	(Ru: Тёмный мир: Равновесие)	
2015	Locust	Lera	(Ru: Саранча)	
2016	Status: Free	Sonya Shmul	(Ru: Статус: Свободен)	
2020	Tsoi	Polina	(Ru: Цой)	
2021	Upon the Magic Roads (Ru: Конёк-горбунок)	The Tsar Maiden	After a Yershov poem and subsequent films (see The Humpbacked Horse)	
2025	The Poet	Avdotya Golitsyna	(Ru: Пророк. История Александра Пушкина)	
2025	Alice in Wonderland	the principal / the Duchess	(Ru: Алиса в Стране чудес)	
2026	Battle of Engines			

=== Television ===
Year	Title	Role	Notes	Citation
2013	The Thaw	Dina	(Ru: Оттепель)	
2014	Grigoriy R.	Irina Yusupova	(Ru: Григорий Р.) 3 episodes	
2018-2019	Better than Us	Arisa	(ru: Лучше, чем люди) Main role - 16 episodes	
2015-2021	The Method	Esenya	32 episodes (Ru: Метод)	
2021	Vertinsky	Vera Kholodnaya	(Ru: Вертинский)	
2022	13 Clinical	Anya	(Ru: 13 клиническая)	
2022	The Telki	Olga	(Ru: The Тёлки)	

=== Screenwriting ===
Year	Title	Notes	Citation
2023	Actresses	(Ru: Актрисы)	
2020	Psycho	(Ru: Псих)	

== Further reading and viewing ==
- Modestova, Alexandra (5 February 2019). "Steppe Change". Drama Quarterly. London, UK: C21Media. Describes the title subject's role and performance in Better than Us.
- Russian Actress Paulina Andreeva During The 68th Cannes Film Festival, Getty Images, Retrieved 6 April 2016.
