= Anna Chipovskaya =

Russian actress

- Анна Чиповская
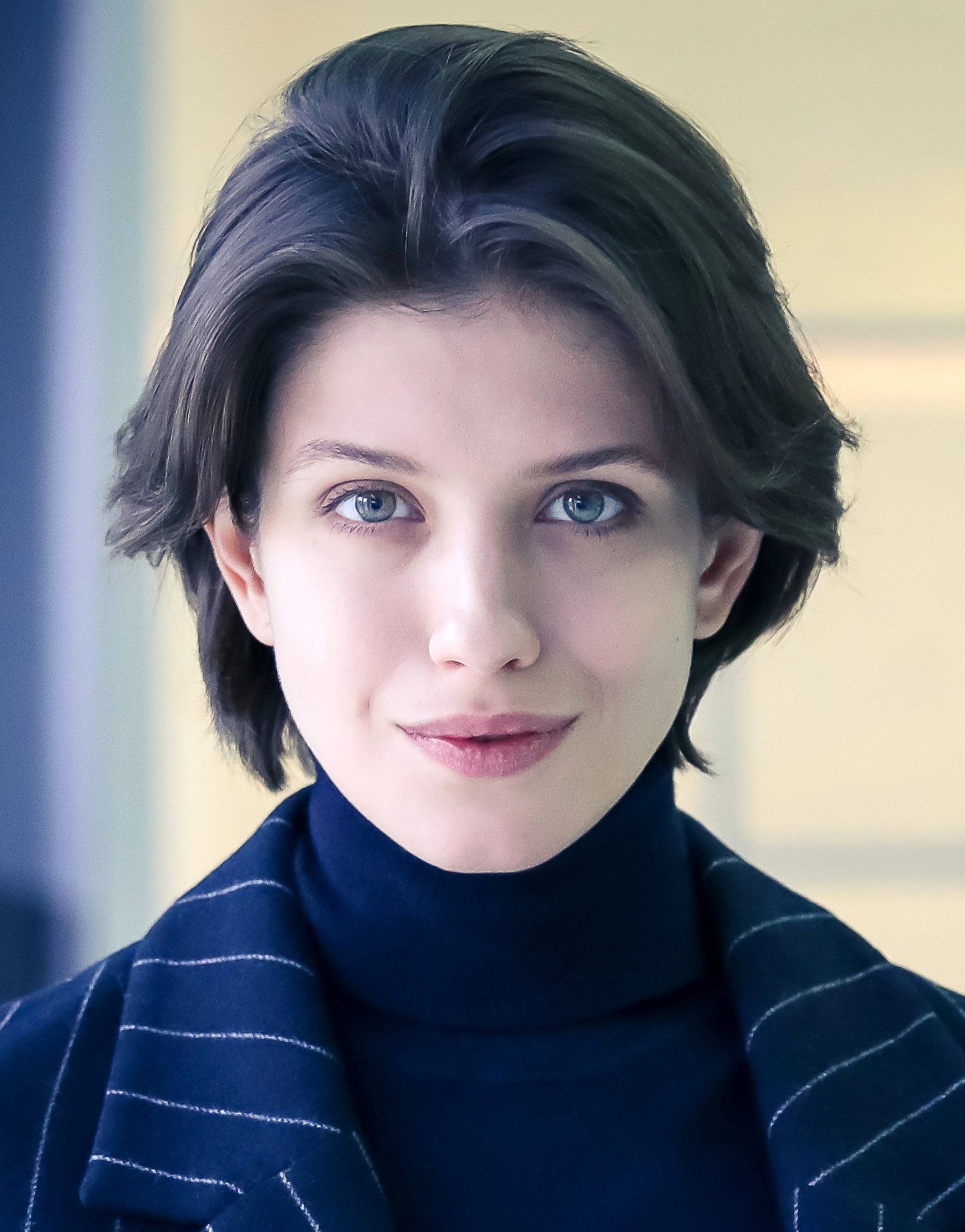
- Chipovskaya in 2019
- Born: Anna Borisovna Chipovskaya; 16 June 1987 (age 39); Moscow, Russian SFSR, Soviet Union
- Education: Moscow Art Theater School
- Occupation: Actress
- Years active: 2003–present

Anna Borisovna Chipovskaya (Russian: А́нна Бори́совна Чипо́вская; born 16 June 1987) is a Russian actress.

== Early life ==
Chipovskaya was born on 16 June 1987 in Moscow in what was then the Russian Soviet Federative Socialist Republic, the daughter of actress Olga Chipovskaya and jazz musician Boris Frumkin. Her parents wanted her to become a translator and enrolled her in linguistic high school. In parallel with her studies, she worked for a modeling agency. She studied until grade 9 and then enrolled in a drama school. In 2009, Chipovskaya graduated from the Moscow Art Theater School and was accepted into the troupe of the Moscow theater studio under the direction of Oleg Tabakov, where she began to play, while still a student. In the same year "Nezavisimaya Gazeta" highlighted her work in the play "Olesya".

== Career ==
When she was a student, where is playing the role of a photographer. She made her movie debut at the age of 16. In the film debuted in 2003 in the TV series Operation "Color of the nation" and the children spy. In 2004 followed by roles in the series "Dear Masha Berezina", "Bachelors" and "Lily of the Valley Silver 2".

She acted in the film "Yolki 3" (2013).

She became popular due to the TV series "The Thaw". The 12-part television series, "The Thaw" (2013), which takes place in the early 1960s, with the participation of developing Anna Chipovskaya main love story line. The image of a young and romantic Maryana Pichugina new and passionate love occurs in the life of the cameraman, professional virtuoso Victor Khrustalyov. Seductive and sexy heroine Anna becomes the first, sometimes agonizing experience in the film and in the relationship to mature in crisis after a recent divorce, a man embodies the rebellious spirit of the sixties – when the dramatic events taking place in it, and on the set, and in the course of the investigation and killing each other, which is involved in a lover Maryana Pichugina.

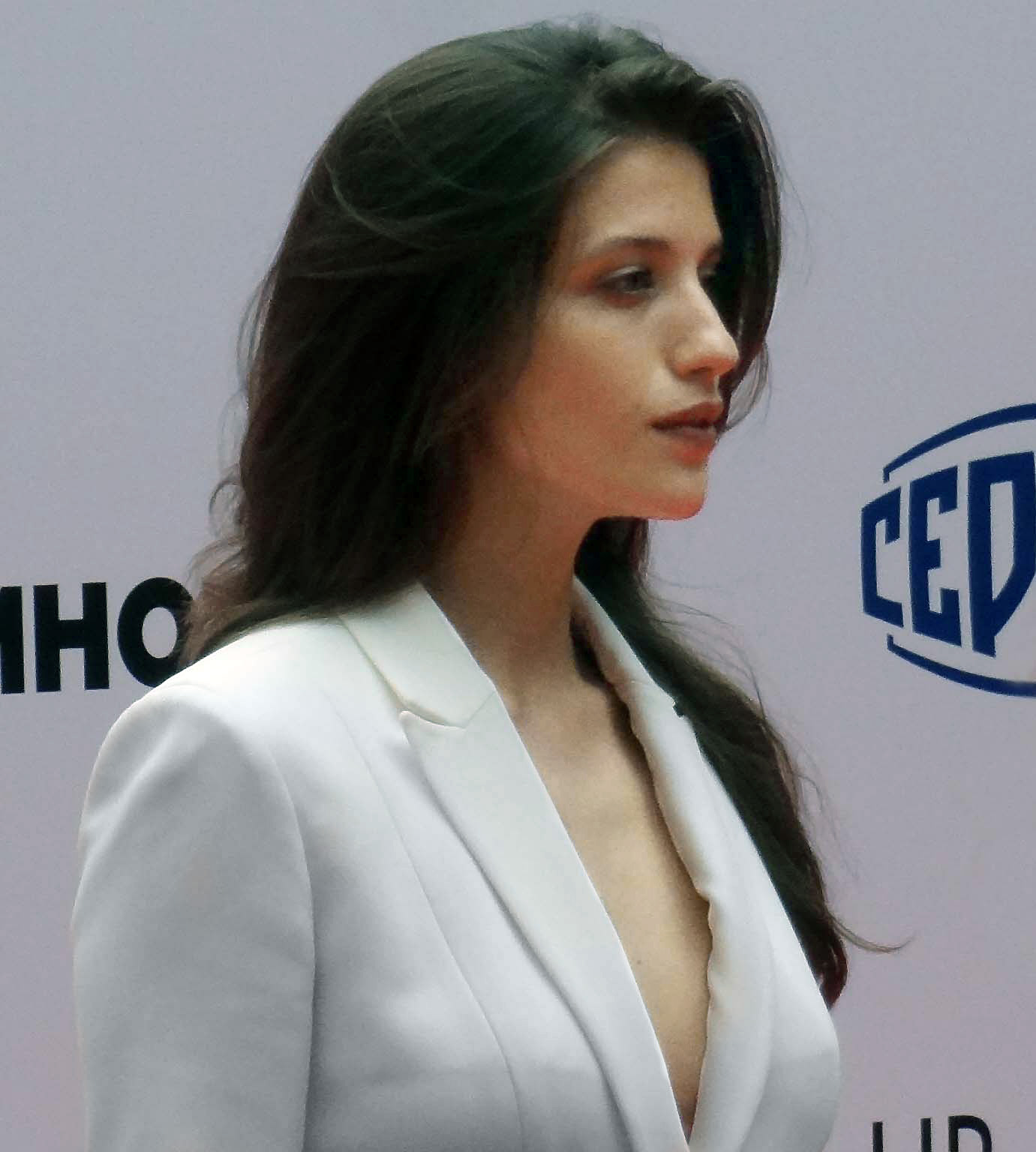
Chipovskaya at Kinotavr 2015

For his role in the TV series "The Thaw" was nominated for "Golden Eagle" (Film Awards 2015) in the category "Best Actress on Television". However, the award went to Anna Chipovskaya's rival, Viktoriya Isakova. Nevertheless, FashionTime.ru portal noted that after «an actress of such a project has the potential to rise to stardom even in Hollywood».

In 2015, she performed in the Russian version of the American folk song, In the Pines titled "Холодного фронта".

In early 2015, the screens out, fantastic film "The Calculator" (2014), filmed in Iceland, where the partner Anna was Yevgeny Mironov, then the sequel "Love with accent and without" with Rezo Gigineishvili and two more series with Anna Chipovskaya.

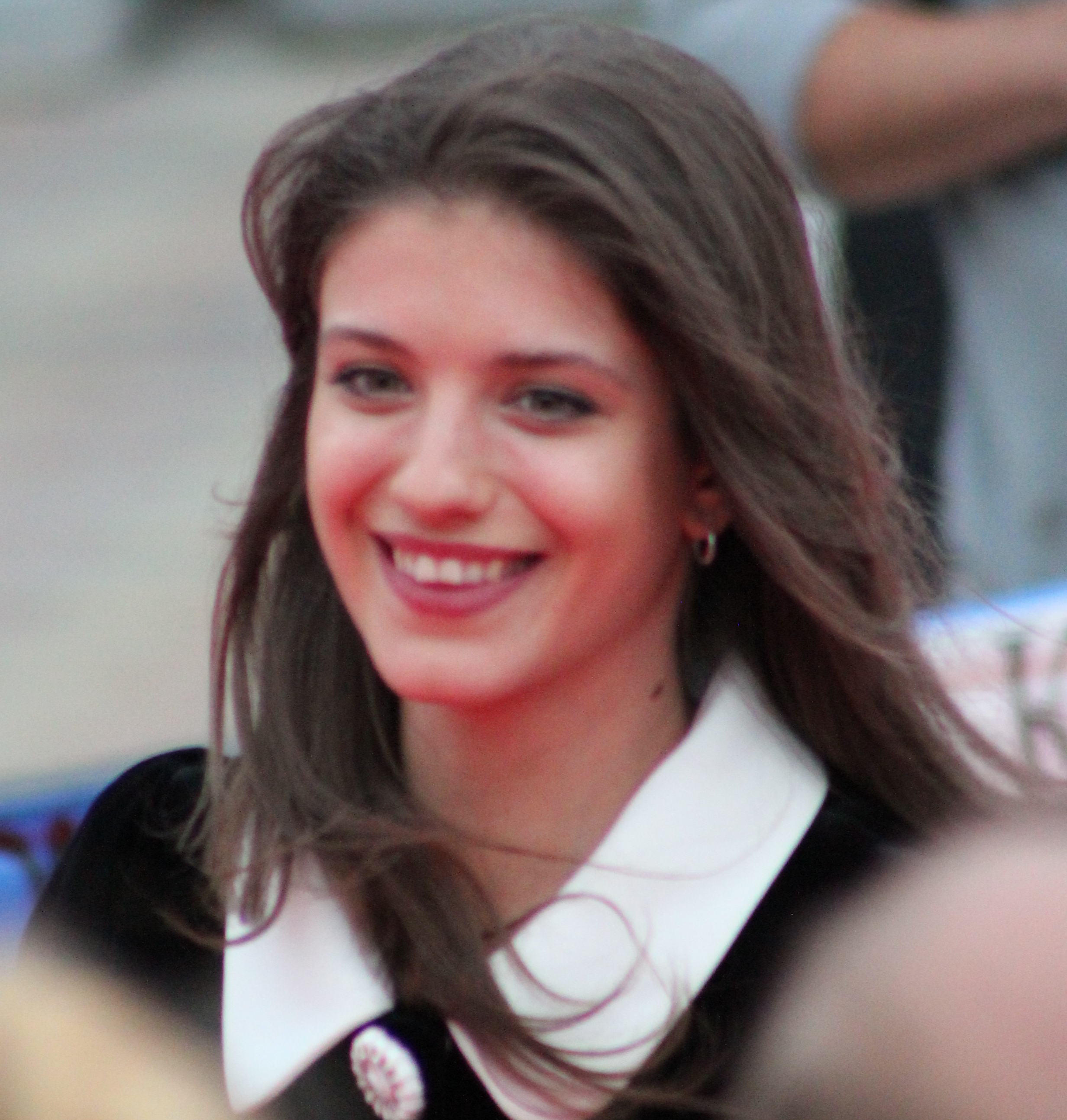
Chipovskaya at On the Edge Film Festival in August 2015

She played the female lead in 2015 romantic comedy movie "Horoscope for good luck".

In 2016, rolling out the detective thriller movie "Pure Art" (2016), also nude scenes in which Anna the main lead Sasha.

In February 2016 in "Snuff Box", the premiere of the play "Nameless Star" on the play by playwright Michael Sebastian with elements of melodrama and tragic farce in the railway surroundings. In the play Anna Chipovskaya stars in Mona, her partner – Pavel Tabakov. That same spring on the first channel with the actress goes detective drama "The NBC Mystery town". Anna Chipovskaya – as eccentric, daring and curious Blogersha, put a spoke in the course of a criminal investigation.

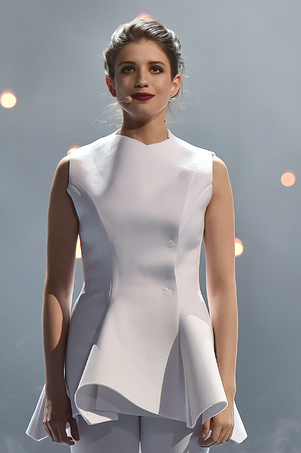
Chipovskaya at the Golden Mask in April 2017

She has endorsed perfumes from Avon Products.

== Filmography ==
=== Film ===
Year	Title	Role	Notes
2005	Male Season: Velvet Revolution	Vershinin's Daughter	(ru)
2006	Labyrinths of love	Sofia	TV movie
2011	Yolki 2	Elena Kravchuk	
2012	The Ballad of Uhlans	Panna Beata	
2012	The Conductor	Darya	(ru)
2012	The Spy	Nadezhda 'Nadya'	
2013	Yolki 3	Lena	
2014	Sex, Coffee, Cigarettes	girl	
2014	The Calculator	Kristi	(ru)
2015	Paws, Bones & Rock'n'roll	Lena, Nastya's mother	
2015	Horoscope for Good Luck	Rita Antonova	(ru)
2015	Without Borders	Polina	
2015	Green Carriage	Marina	(ru)
2015	Good Job		Short
2016	Pure Art	Sasha Gaidukova	(ru)
2016	Superbad	Masha	
2017	About Love	Nina	
2017	Blockbuster	Natasha Tulpanova	(ru)
2020	Masha	Masha adult	
2020	Has Anyone Seen My Girl?	Kira	
2025	The Poet	Yelizaveta Vorontsova	

=== Television ===
Year	Title	Role	Notes
2003	Operation "Color of the Nation"	Anya	
2004	Lily of the Valley Silver 2	Sani	
2005	Dear Masha Berezina	Sveta Popova	
2008	Bachelors	Zhenya	
2009	Bros	Nastya Tsareva	
2010	Bros – 2	Nastya Tsareva	
2013	Everything Began in Harbin	Lyudmila Erzhanova	Mini-Series
2013	The Thaw	Maryana Pichugina	
2014	Not Casual Meeting	Margarita	
2014	Leaving Nature	Alla Gulyaeva	
2017	The Road to Calvary	Darya Bulavina	
2020	The Last Minister	Tonya Redkina	
2020	Psycho	Lena	
2020	Passengers	Mary	
