= Vertinsky (TV series) =

2021 Russian television series

- Genre: Drama, Biographical
- Created by: Anastasiya Vertinskaya; Konstantin Ernst
- Written by: Avdotya Smirnova; Anna Parmas with John Shemyakin
- Directed by: Avdotya Smirnova
- Starring: Aleksey Filimonov
- Composer: Igor Vdovin
- Country of origin: Russia
- Original language: Russian
- No. of seasons: 1
- No. of episodes: 8

Production
- Executive producers: Danila Ippolitov; Fyodor Pospelov
- Producers: Konstantin Ernst (general); Sergey Titinkov; Natalya Smirnova
- Cinematography: Sergey Trofimov
- Running time: 57–75 minutes
- Production company: Globus-Film

Original release
- Network: Kion
- Release: 13 September – 25 October 2021
- Network: Channel One
- Release: 29 November – 8 December 2021

Vertinsky is a Russian musical biographical drama television series directed by Avdotya Smirnova about the life of singer Alexander Vertinsky. Aleksey Filimonov stars in the lead role. The series premiered on the streaming service Kion from 13 September to 25 October 2021. It received critical acclaim and won the Golden Eagle Award for Best Online Platform Series.

== Plot ==
The series follows the life of Alexander Vertinsky, starting with him at age 25, posing nude for student artists and earning money with cocaine, legal in pharmacies at the time. After the revolution, he travels abroad, performing in Istanbul, Paris, Berlin, New York City, Los Angeles, Harbin, and Shanghai, before returning to the wartime USSR in 1943.

Each episode is structured around a song that concludes the segment. For example, Cocaine Girl follows the tragic fate of Vertinsky's sister, and To the Cadets accompanies the execution of cadets in the Kremlin. Other songs include In the Moldavian Steppe…, Lilac Negro, Magnolia Tango, Without Women, Above the Pink Sea, Yellow Angel, Daughters, and I Was Always With Those…

== Cast ==
- Aleksey Filimonov as Alexander Vertinsky
- Stepan Devonin as Alexander Osmerkin, friend and avant-garde painter
- Sergey Umanov as Konstantin Ageev, poet friend
- Yulia Marchenko as Nadia Vertinskaya, Alexander's sister
- Aleksandr Ustyugov as Sergei Evgenievich, theatrical actor
- Pavel Yerlykov as Ivan Mozzhukhin, actor friend
- Paulina Andreeva as Vera Kholodnaya, actress
- Anton Gritsenko as Vladimir Kholodny, officer
- Anna Mikhalkova as Alexandra Burkovskaya, Soviet agent
- John Shemyakin as Burkovskaya's husband
- Pavel Chinarev as Vasiliy Roshchin
- Anna Rytsareva as Masha Roshchina
- Alyona Babenko as Elena Pavlovna
- Sergey Rost as Vladimir Solomatin
- Anna Willer as Tatyana Vadimovna
- Gennadiy Smirnov as Mikhail Polyakov, pianist
- Ekaterina Shcheglova as Ralya Polonskaya, first wife
- Fyodor Lavrov as Prince Nikola Karageorgevich
- Nikita Kologrivyy as Vatsek
- Leonid Alimov as Yuri Morfessi
- Viktoriya Isakova as Marlene Dietrich
- Kirill Syomin as Rudolf Sieber
- Ivan Shibanov as Kurt Schlegel
- Mikhail Trukhin as Yegor Bachurov
- Natalia Rogozhkina as Mira Bachurova
- Ekaterina Vilkova as Bubi
- Vadim Skvirsky as Vyacheslav Molotov
- Anna Mishina as Lida Cirgvaava
- Ksenia Rappoport as Lidiya Pavlovna
- Polina Vitorgan as Galya
- Vagan Saroyan as Levka
- Aleksandr Pavelyev as Mollers
- Yevgeny Muravich as Soviet consul in Shanghai
- Andrey Smirnov as Ilya Ivanovich
- Arina Utrobina as Zhenya Kholodnaya
- Olivia Ganus as Sasha Kholodnaya

== Production and release ==
The series was initiated by Anastasiya Vertinskaya and Channel One CEO Konstantin Ernst. The script, developed by Smirnova, Parmas, and Shemyakin, used family archives. Production was delayed due to the 2014–2015 Russian currency crisis and resumed in late 2018 with support from Roman Abramovich and Sergey Adonyev.

== Reception ==
Critics praised the cinematography, set design, and performances, especially Filimonov's portrayal of Vertinsky. Composer Igor Vdovin received acclaim for the musical score.
