= Passengers (Russian TV series) =

2020 drama television series

- Genre: Mystery, drama
- Created by: Ruslan Sorokin
- Written by: Larisa Leonenko; Anna Anosova; Ekaterina Sokolova-Zhuber; Alexander Talal (season 1); Valeria Valtsova (season 1); Yakov Sivchenko (season 1); Yulia Dragoshanskaya (season 1); Pavel Ganin (season 1); Ruslan Sorokin (season 2); Evgeny Izrailit (season 2)
- Directed by: Karen Oganesyan (season 1); Artyom Litvinenko (season 2)
- Starring: Kirill Käro; Sergey Gilyov; Anna Chipovskaya; Sergey Shakurov
- Composer: Alexey Chintsov
- Country of origin: Russia
- Original language: Russian
- No. of seasons: 2
- No. of episodes: 16

Production
- Executive producers: Polina Ivanova (season 1); Alexander Ostapyuk (season 2)
- Producers: Eduard Iloyan (gen.); Vitaly Shlyappo (gen.); Alexey Trotsyuk (gen.); Denis Zhalinsky (gen.); Mikhail Tkachenko; Ruslan Sorokin; Irina Sosnovaya (season 1)
- Cinematography: Vasily Grigolyunas (season 1); Artyom Burko (season 2)
- Running time: 20 min.
- Production companies: Start Studio; Kargo Films (season 1)

Original release
- Network: Start
- Release: 24 December 2020 – 27 May 2022

Passengers (Russian: Пассажи́ры) is a Russian drama television series with elements of mysticism. The lead roles are played by Kirill Käro, Sergey Gilyov, Anna Chipovskaya, and Sergey Shakurov. The series premiered on 24 December 2020 on the START streaming service. The second season, titled Passengers: The Last Love on Earth, was released from 8 April to 27 May 2022.

== Plot ==
The main character of the series is taxi driver Andrei, who drives an old Mercedes around Moscow. His passengers are the souls of those who did not manage to complete something important in life; until they understand what holds them to Earth, the taxi continues its journey.

== Cast ==
- Kirill Käro (episodes 1–10, 14) — Andrei
- Anatoly Bely (episode 1) — Igor, Svetlana's husband
- Yuliya Snigir (episode 1) — Svetlana
- Ekaterina Sokolova-Zhuber (episodes 1–6, 8) — Vera
- Olga Sheina (episodes 1, 3–5, 8) — Galina
- Egor Gubarev (episode 2) — Sashka
- Sergey Gilyov (episodes 3, 8–16) — Kirill
- Maria Ivanova (episode 3) — Tonya
- Yulia Aug (episode 4) — Lyudmila
- Sergey Zharkov (episodes 2, 4, 8) — Dima
- Andrey Burkovsky (episode 5) — Nikita
- Daniil Vorobyov (episode 5) — Vadim
- Anastasia Ukolova (episode 6) — Vika
- Daniil Kiselev (episode 6) — Max
- Venyamin Smekhov (episode 7) — Oleg Borisovich Glebov
- Anastasia Todoreshku (episodes 7–8) — Inga (Death)
- Tatyana Smirnova (episode 8) — Andrei's mother
- Anna Chipovskaya (episodes 9–16) — Mary
- Natalia Vdovina (episode 9) — Ella
- Ruslan Medvedev (episode 9) — Konstantin
- Polina Aynutdinova (episode 9) — Sophie
- Nikita Kologrivyy (episode 10) — Evgeny
- Egor Tishkanin (episode 10) — Artyom
- Zhenya Gromova (episode 10) — Evgenia
- Sergey Shakurov (episodes 11–13, 15–16) — Master
- Lev Malishava (episode 11) — Maximenko
- Danil Ivanov (episode 11) — Anisimov
- Polina Dolindo (episode 11) — Vera
- Alexandra Bulychyova (episode 12) — Kristina
- Nadezhda Markina (episode 12) — Nadezhda
- Irina Rakhmanova (episode 12) — Tamara
- Olga Naumenko (episode 13) — Liza
- Ivan Verkhovykh (episode 13) — Arkady
- Elizaveta Shakira (episode 14) — Irina
- Evgeny Sidikhin (episode 14) — Anatoly
- Veronika Mokhireva (episode 15) — Yulya / Mila
- Yuriy Chursin (episode 16) — Viktor

== Production ==
Filming was announced on 6 October 2020. The first trailer was released on 16 December. On 23 December, a music video for the song “Того что нет” by the band Би-2 was released as part of the soundtrack.

The creators announced that the episodes would be short, 15–20 minutes each. According to director Karen Oganesyan: “We wondered whether we could make the viewer experience an entire spectrum of emotions in such a short time — love, hatred, forgiveness. This was a special challenge for me and for the actors.”

== Release and reception ==
Passengers was presented at the international conference *Content London* in the *Hot Properties* category as one of three non-English dramas expected to be among the most influential in the next eighteen months.

The first season was digitally released on 14 December 2020.

The second season was initially scheduled to premiere on 25 February 2022, but was moved to 8 April 2022.

Several media outlets included Passengers in lists of the most anticipated series of December 2020.

A reviewer for Komsomolskaya Pravda, after watching the first season, noted that although the story is based on a classic idea, it is “executed quite decently — the series does not fall into the abyss of silly pathos, though at times it walks very close to the edge.”
