= Masha (2020 film) =

- Russian film poster
- Directed by: Anastasiya Palchikova
- Written by: Anastasiya Palchikova
- Produced by: Ruben Dishdishyan; Valeriy Fedorovich; Evgeniy Nikishov
- Starring: Anna Chipovskaya; Maksim Sukhanov; Sergey Dvoynikov; Polina Gukhman; Iris Lebedeva; Aleksandr Mizev
- Cinematography: Gleb Filatov
- Production companies: 1-2-3 Production; Mars Media
- Release dates: September 2020 (Kinotavr); 1 April 2021 (Russia)
- Running time: 85 minutes
- Country: Russia
- Language: Russian

Masha (Russian: Маша) is a 2020 Russian thriller drama film directed by Anastasiya Palchikova. It is scheduled to be theatrically released on 1 April 2021. The film took part in the competition program of the Kinotavr festival and won the prize for "Best Debut".

== Plot ==
The film follows a young girl named Masha, who grows up surrounded by her hooligan friends in a small town in the 1990s. Despite their reputation for robbing and killing, Masha views them as the best people in the world—they love and protect her, and she sings jazz to them, dreaming of becoming a singer. However, Masha’s world is shattered when she learns the harsh truth about who they really are and the impact they’ve had on her life and family. As an adult, she moves to Moscow, attempting to escape her past, but eventually, her history catches up with her, and she is forced to return to the place where her childhood unfolded.

== Cast ==
- Anna Chipovskaya as adult Masha
  - Polina Gukhman as little Masha
- Maksim Sukhanov as uncle
- Sergey Dvoynikov as Treshka
- Iris Lebedeva as Lena
- Aleksandr Mizev as Andrey
