= Svetlana Antonova =

Russian theater and film actress

- Светлана Антонова
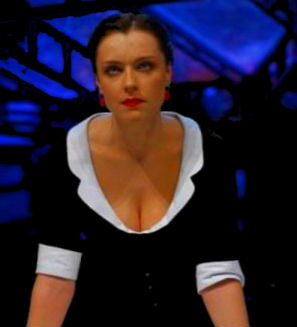
- Svetlana Antonova as The Mistress of the Inn (2011)
- Born: Svetlana Sergeevna Antonova; 10 December 1979 (age 46); Moscow, RSFSR, USSR
- Occupation: Actress
- Years active: 2001–present
- Spouses: Oleg Dolin (divorced): Alexander Zhigalkin
- Children: Maria (2004); Taisiya (2012); Arseny (2016); Aglaya (2021)

Svetlana Sergeevna Antonova (Russian: Светла́на Серге́евна Анто́нова; born 10 December 1979) is a Russian theater and film actress.

== Early life ==
She learned to swim at the age of 8 and is also interested in painting and photography.

She graduated from Boris Shchukin Theatre Institute.

Her elder sister is actress Natalia Antonova.

== Career ==
She worked in the Moscow Satire Theatre from 2001 to 2011.

== Theatre Works ==
- Apple thief as Shura Drozd
- Secretaries as mistress
- Eight Loving Women as Catherine
- Ornifl as Margarita
- The Mistress of the Inn as Mirandolina
- No Сentimes Less! as Vilda
- Schastlivtsev / Neschastlivtsev as fan girl
- Perfect Murder as Mary Selby, secretary

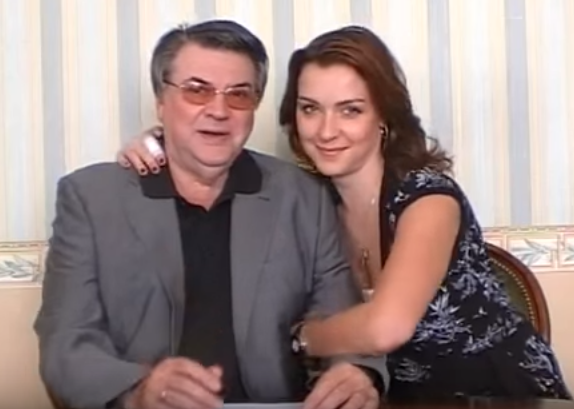
Aleksandr Shirvindt and Svetlana Antonova

== Filmography ==
- 2000 — Playing in Love as videotape seller
- 2001 — FM and Guys as Zlata
- 2001 — Citizen Head (TV series) as Natasha, Ferdolevsky's secretary
- 2001 — Love and Other Nightmares as episode
- 2001 — Mamuka as episode
- 2002 — Code of Honor as Anna
- 2003 — Station as Oksana
- 2003 — Evlampia Romanova. Investigations Lead Amateur as Tanya
- 2004 — Ashes of the Phoenix as Svetlana Neverova
- 2005 — My love as Angela Rayskaya
- 2006 — Piranha as Olga Khmelnytskaya, chemist, biologist
- 2007 — Missing Divers Bay (TV series) as Alyona Shebarshina
- 2007 — Sea Patrol (TV series) as Marina
- 2007 — My Light as Sveta
- 2008 — Mines in the fairway as Margarita Kuzmitskaya
- 2008 — Montecristo (TV series) as Olga Orlova
- 2008 — Crazy Love as Nastya Strelnikova
- 2009 — Sea Patrol 2 (TV series) as Marina
- 2009 — Detective Agency Ivan da Marya (TV series) as Marya
- 2009 — Moscow Fireworks as Anton
- 2009 — Dirty Work (TV series) as Anya
- 2010 — Left Work (TV series) as Maria
- 2010 — №13 as Lily
- 2010 — Palm Sunday (TV series) as Maria
- 2010 — Alibi Double as Vera Barkhatova, investigator / private investigator
- 2011 — Quiet pool as Sasha
- 2011 — Eagle Eye! as Lily
- 2011 — Unloved as Veronica Markina, MD
- 2011 — Insurance Сase as Maria
- 2011 — Prediction as Elena
- 2011 — Yeltsin: Three Days in August as Tatyana Dyachenko
- 2012 — Impostor (TV series) as Marta / Ksenia
- 2013 — My White and Fluffy as Elena
- 2013 — The Flowers of Evil (TV series) as Irina Eliseeva, psychologist
- 2014 — Blade Runner (TV series) as Lidia Lozinskaya
- 2014 — Section Restless (TV series) as Tatiana Petrova
- 2015 — The Junior Team (TV series) as dr. Yelizaveta Andreyevna Krasnova
- 2016 / 2017 — Voronin's Family (TV series) as Simona Albertovna
- 2018 — Dr. Kotov as Rita
- 2018 — Need a Man as Maya
