= Daria Leygonie-Fialko =

- Дар'я Легоні-Фіалко
- Born: 9 July 1979 (age 47); Kyiv, Ukraine
- Citizenship: Ukraine
- Education: Taras Shevchenko National University of Kyiv
- Occupations: film producer, media manager
- Known for: co-founder of Space production company
- Website: https://www.imdb.com/name/nm6358637

Daria Leygonie-Fialko (maiden name Fialko; born 9 July 1979) is a Ukrainian media manager, producer and the founder of Space Production. Co-founder of The Organization of Ukrainian Producers. Member of EPC (European Producers Club) and International Emmy Awards.

Space is an international production and distribution company, based in Kyiv and Paris. Space Production has extensive experience in creating content in a variety of genres: detective and action drama series, comedies, sport dramas, docudramas and documentaries for TV channels and media platforms. During the last few years SPACE has produced a line-up of successful projects, such as "Trace", "Water police", "The Blind", "C.O.D.E.", "Last Axel", "Blackout. Christmas", "Art in War" (co-pro for ARTE) and many others.

== Early life and education ==
Fialko was born on 9 July 1979 in Kyiv, in the family of theater critics. Father, Valery Oleksiyovych Fialko Honored Art Worker of Ukraine, professor, head of the Department of Theater Studies, teacher of theatrical criticism and history of Russian cheater at Kyiv National I. K. Karpenko-Kary Theater, Cinema and Television University. Mother, Huievska Olga Yuriivna—theater expert, deputy director for research at The State Museum of Theater, Music and Cinema of Ukraine.

In 2001, Fialko graduated from Taras Shevchenko National University of Kyiv, Faculty of Foreign Philology with a degree in Romano-Germanic Languages and Literature. In 2006, she received an MBA degree from the International Institute of Management (Ukraine-Switzerland) in the speciality "Foreign Economic Activity Management".

== Career ==
During her studies at the university, from 1997 to 1999, Fialko worked as a journalist in the press service of the Ukrainian TV channel "1+1", at the same time she was an interpreter and moderator of press conferences at "Molodist" film festival.

From 2002 to 2005 Fialko was the Head of Film Acquisitions at 1+1 TV channel, and in 2005 she became the Programming Director of this channel.

Three years later, in 2008, Fialko started her work at the Star Media film company as the Producer-In-Chief of television projects. Among her projects are such popular Ukrainian shows as "Maidan's" and "Maidan's-2" on Inter TV channel, "People's Star-2" ("People's Star") and "People's Star-3" on "Ukraine" and others. In 2011 Fialko has left the Star Media film company.

From December 2011 until August 2016, she was the General Manager of the Russian TV-channel TV-3.

From September 2016 until April 2018, Fialko worked as the General Manager of CTC, the biggest entertainment channel in Russia.

In June 2018, Fialko founded the TV production company Space together with her partner Kateryna Laskari. Space has been created as a full-cycle production house, as well as a creative producer's centre, generating content for Ukraine and worldwide.

One of the first projects were the Ukrainian series "Trace" and "The Blind" for STB TV channel. The company produces comedies, detective stories, sports dramas, melodramas etc., such as "The Adulteress", "The Kinfolk", "Water Police", "Last Axel", "DreamTeam" and others.

According to the independent study by MRM (Media Resources Management), Space Production became the leader in terms of the number of episodes produced for Ukrainian television in 2020.

In March 2022, together with other biggest names in Ukrainian TV production industry, Fialko co-founded The Organization of Ukrainian Producers (OUP). The main task of OUP is to film documentary projects and feature films on Russian military aggression on the territory of Ukraine. During its first years, OUP produced 14 projects, including the documentaries "Art in War" and "Blackout. Christmas". In 2023, the documentary "Art in War", produced by Space Production in co-production with the German company Broadview and in partnership with the Organization of Ukrainian Producers (OUP), was broadcast on ARTE.

Daria Leygonie-Fialko, together with her business partner, co-founder of Space Production Kateryna Laskari, are actively developing co-productions worldwide. The company currently has a number of projects in different stages of realisation.

In April 2024, Space Production launched a new brand for the Ukrainian TV channel STB. That was the television series C.O.D.E., which quickly became a landmark event on the Ukrainian television market. From its very first weeks, C.O.D.E. soared to the top of the prime-time ratings, claiming the first spot among Ukrainian broadcasters.

== Personal life ==
Married, her husband Antoine Leygonie-Fialko is French by nationality, the couple has two children.

== Awards ==
2011 — the show ‘Maidan's’ — finalist of the ‘Teletriumph 2011’ award in the category ‘Original Entertainment Programme’.

2011 — Daria Fialko — finalist for the Teletriumph 2011 award in the category ‘Producer (production team) of a television programme’ (together with Volodymyr Zelenskyy, Serhiy Shefir, Boris Shefir and Vladislav Ryashin) for the show ‘Maidan's’.

2013 — The Firm's Secret magazine named Fialko "the youngest general director of a federal television channel in the Russian Federation".

2016 — "Anna The Detective" series - the winner of Film and Television Producers Association Award in the nomination "Best TV series (more than 24 episodes)".

2018 — the series "Flying Crew" - winner of TEFI-2018 award in the nomination "Television serial comedy / Sitcom".

== Producer ==
=== Documentary ===
2023 - Art in War (together Broadview TV for Arte TV channel)

=== TV series ===
2024 until present — C.O.D.E. («STB»)

2022 — The Water Police («Ukraine TV channel»)

2021 — The Last Axel (original for MEGOGO online platform)

2021 — Unfaithful («STB»)

2020 — Folks («1+1»)

2020 — The Trace («STB»)

2020 until present — The Blind («STB»)

2018 — New Man («CTC»)

2018 — Girls Don't Give Up («CTC»)

2018 — Rocking Crew (Season 1) («CTC»)

2018 — Team B («CTC»)

2017 — Psychologists (Season 1) («CTC»)

2017-2018 — The Junior Team (seasons 5 and 6) («CTC»)

2017-2018 — The Ivanovs vs. The Ivanovs (seasons 1 and 2) («CTC»)

2017 — The Unknown («TV-3»)

2016 — Anna The Detective («TV-3»)

2014 — Thirteen («TV-3»)

2012-2016 — The Fifth Guard («TV-3»)

2008 — The Champion («TV-3»)

=== TV projects ===
2011 — entertainment show Maidan's 2 («Inter»)

2011 — entertainment dancing show Maidan's («Inter»)

2011 — studio game show Women's Logic («1 + 1»)

2009 — talent show People's Star-3 («Ukraine TV channel»)

2008 — talent show People's Star-2 («Ukraine TV channel»)

2008 — magazine Galileo («К1»)
