= Psycho (TV series) =

- Genre: psychological drama
- Created by: Paulina Andreeva; Fyodor Bondarchuk
- Written by: Paulina Andreeva
- Starring: Konstantin Bogomolov; Elena Lyadova; Roza Khairullina; Alexander Gorchilin; Oleg Menshikov
- Composer: Igor Vdovin
- Country of origin: Russia
- Original language: Russian
- No. of series: 1
- No. of episodes: 8

Production
- Executive producer: Nastasya Gomiashvili
- Producers: Sergey Bondarchuk; Alexey Kiselyov; Anastasia Koretskaya; Vyacheslav Murugov; Maxim Rybakov
- Cinematography: Yury Nikogosov; Nikolai Bogachyov
- Editors: Anna Krutiy; Alexander Puzyryov
- Running time: 52 min.
- Production companies: NMG Studio; Videoprokat Studio

Original release
- Network: more.tv
- Release: 5 November – 24 December 2020

Psycho (Russian: Псих, romanized: Psikh) is a Russian drama series directed by Fyodor Bondarchuk. The project is being produced by NMG Studio and Videoprokat Studio. The series became one of the original projects in the more originals line.

The series premiered on November 5, 2020 on the online service more.tv.

== Plot ==
Oleg, a highly sought-after 40-year-old psychotherapist in Moscow, has a packed schedule that makes it difficult for clients to secure an appointment. To his patients, he appears to be a successful, self-assured family man. However, internally, he is in turmoil, struggling with his own need for professional help and the unresolved mystery of his wife’s disappearance over a year ago.

Oleg's mother, Kira, is a sexologist and university professor. Observing her son’s deep grief over his missing wife, she gives him a doll crafted in the likeness of a woman. In time, Oleg begins to see his wife in the doll, blurring the lines between reality and his own psychological distress.

== Cast ==
- Konstantin Bogomolov as Oleg
- Elena Lyadova as Vera
- Roza Khairullina as Kira, Oleg's mother
- Vladimir Simonov as Nikolay Stepanovich
- Igor Vernik as Artyom
- Marina Aleksandrova as Sasha, Artyom's wife
- Anna Chipovskaya as Lena
- Alexander Gorchilin as Kostya, Vera's boyfriend
- Oleg Menshikov as Igor
- Yuliya Aug as Nadenka

== Production ==
The creation of the series was announced on September 23, 2019 at the presentation of the launch of the online service more.tv in Moscow.

The project became the first series in the filmography of film director Fyodor Bondarchuk. The series was shot according to the script by Paulina Andreeva (Bondarchuk's wife), for whom the project became her debut as a screenwriter. Initially, he did not know who wrote the script (the manuscript was without authorship).

Filming of the series started on October 7, 2019 in the TsUM. With a break in early September 2020 filming was completed.

55 shooting shifts took place in Zaryadye Park, the Shchusev Museum of Architecture, Lytkarino and near Zvenigorod.

In June 2020 the series was presented on the first Russian online content market Key Buyers Event: Digital Edition.

On July 20, 2020 the teaser of the series premiered on the YouTube channel more.tv.
