= Rodina (TV series) =

- Also known as: Homeland
- Родина
- Genre: Serial drama; Psychological thriller; Political thriller; Espionage thriller
- Based on: Prisoners of War by Gideon Raff
- Developed by: Pavel Lungin Tamás T. Tóth
- Starring: Vladimir Mashkov; Sergey Makovetsky; Viktoriya Isakova; Andrei Merzlikin
- Country of origin: Russia
- Original language: Russian
- No. of seasons: 1
- No. of episodes: 12

Production
- Executive producers: Timur Weinstein; Gideon Raff
- Producer: Timur Weinstein
- Production locations: Moscow; Moscow Oblast
- Editors: Michael Schulman; Pavel Lungin
- Camera setup: Single-camera
- Running time: 48–68 minutes
- Production companies: WeiT Media; Keshet Media Group

Original release
- Network: Russia-1
- Release: March 16 – March 26, 2015

"In adapting the most important thing - to find the salt, the essence of the story that touches the audience, how to convey emotion on screen. We need to do a story that is very close to the Russian audience."

— Timur Weinstein

Rodina (Russian: Родина; Homeland) is a Russian political thriller television series developed by Pavel Lungin and Timur Weinstein, based on the Israeli series Hatufim, which was created by Gideon Raff. Rodina is a second adaptation of Hatufim, after the American version Homeland by Howard Gordon and Alex Gansa.

The series stars Viktoriya Isakova as Anna Zimina, a Federal Security Service (FSB) officer, and Vladimir Mashkov as Alexey Bragin, a Russian Marine Corps sniper. Anna comes to believe that Alexey, who was held captive by Chechen terrorists as a prisoner of war, was "turned" by the enemy and threatens the Russian Federation.

The series was broadcast in the Russian Federation on channel Russia-1, and produced by WeiT Media. The first episode aired on March 16, 2015, and the last on March 26, 2015. The series was a ratings hit, with the premiere the network's highest-rated show in two years.

== Overview ==
The series begins in 1993. Marine Colonel Alexey Bragin and sniper Yuri Khamzin go missing during a military operation in the North Caucasus.

In 1999, a joint force of the FSB's Alpha Group and Spetsnaz GRU raids a terrorist camp in the North Caucasus. Capturing a bunker, they find a bearded Colonel Bragin chained to a wall. Bragin's liberation becomes a media event. Physically and psychologically exhausted by long years of torture and solitary confinement, Bragin begins working with doctors and psychologists, as well as Anna Zimina, an expert analyst from the FSB's Counterterrorism Center.

At the heart of the plot is a confrontation between Bragin, who is experiencing post-traumatic stress disorder and is suspected of recruiting terrorists, and Anna, the FSB officer assigned to investigate him.

== Plot ==
1993. Anna Zimina is an FSB officer recently recalled from Beirut after angering the Lebanese government. Anna is liked and trusted by her mentor Mikhail Volskiy and tolerated by her boss Bagmet. During her assignment in Lebanon, she hears a rumor from one of her contacts in Beirut that a Russian military officer has been "turned."

In 1999, Anna learns that a Russian Army Alpha Force team in Chechnya has found Russian Marine Corps major Alexey Bragin, who had been believed killed in 1993. While the rest of the FSB and the political establishment believe Bragin to be a war hero, Anna is worried that he has been recruited and brainwashed by Chechen chief Bin Jalid to act as a sleeper agent. She begins an illegal audio and video surveillance of Bragin's home hoping to catch him at something to prove her suspicions correct.

The surveillance reveals the difficulties Bragin has upon his return home. Believing him dead, his wife Yelena had developed a relationship with Bragin's younger brother Dmitry that beyond the affair, was moving towards Dmitry moving in with the family. Bragin must now adjust to life at home with his wife and two children, 12-year-old Vanya and the troubled and self-destructive 16-year-old Katya. His readjustment is complicated by his erratic behavior and his difficulty being physically intimate with his wife. Unbeknownst to his family or Anna, Bragin converted to Islam during his captivity, and prays daily in his storage in private. Flashbacks also show that he has not been entirely truthful about his captivity. However, the surveillance by Anna uncovers no incriminating evidence and is eventually shut down.

Frustrated, Anna decides to continue the surveillance all by herself. Anna and Alexey meet at a pub and get drunk. They meet again when one of Bragin's former jailers is captured and Bragin is brought in to observe the interrogation. Bragin convinces Bagmet to allow him to have a moment to confront his former jailer, but the meeting ends violently. Later, the prisoner is found to have committed suicide. Anna believes Bragin killed him. She arranges for polygraphs for all those who had access to the prisoner. Bragin passes, but Anna suspects he is lying when he is able to deny that he has been unfaithful to his wife.

Meanwhile, an asset of Anna's who works as a courtesan for a Qatari prince contacts Anna with photo of Bin Jalid meeting with the prince. Shortly afterwards, she is murdered and an expensive necklace given to her by the prince is stolen. Suspecting that the necklace is being used to fund a terrorist operation, the FSB tracks the funds to a local couple, who have purchased a home near the Kremlin. After being tipped off by an anonymous contact, they are go on the run where the husband is killed and the wife tries to escape to Estonia, where she is captured by Mikhail.

Bragin, having discovered that his wife was having an affair with his brother, meets Anna and they go to her family's lakefront cabin. They have sex, but Bragin becomes suspicious after Anna inadvertently says the brand name of the tea he usually drinks. Bragin finds a loaded gun in the house and confronts Anna, who admits her suspicions. Bragin admits to having been converted to Islam by Bin Jalid, whom he met while being held captive. He explains that Jalid was kind to him and that he came to "love" the terrorist leader, but denies working for Chechen terrorists. Anna receives a call from Mikhail, indicating that a woman has identified the terrorist as Yuri Khamzin, Bragin's Scout Sniper partner, who even Bragin had believed to be dead. Anna profusely apologizes to Bragin, claiming that she has real feelings for him, but he angrily returns to his family.

As the FSB begins tracking Yuri Khamzin, Bragin has a surprise meeting with the State Duma member, Oleg Basov, who recruits Bragin to join his Party. Bragin then makes contact with Bin Jalid, revealing that he really is, in fact, a terrorist and spy for the Chechen. Flashbacks show that Bragin had been taken out of captivity by Jalid in order to teach his son, Mussa, to speak Russian. Bragin came to love the boy and when he was killed in a Russian military attack, Bragin vowed revenge on his own country. Bragin meets with a local tailor who gives him a suicide vest. All seems to be going according to plan, but his odd behavior begins to worry his daughter.

Bragin is asked to attend an event where Oleg Basov will announce his intention to run for the presidency. At the event (taking part in the Red Square), Yuri Khamzin assassinates one of Basov's aides, forcing all the dignitaries, including Bragin, to flee into Lenin's Mausoleum. Realizing that Bragin is likely working with Khamzin, Anna attempts to contact the FSB. Bragin tries to detonate his suicide vest but it malfunctions. He repairs it and is about to try again when he receives a phone call from his daughter Katya, who begs him to come home. He is unable to go through with his mission. Meanwhile, a Spetsnaz unit finds Yuri Khamzin and shoots him to death. Later, Bragin meets with Anna, who apologizes for suspecting him of terrorism, he warns her to stay away from him and his family from now on.

Afterwards, Mikhail talks to doctor near the hospital room to prepare Anna for electroconvulsive therapy (ECT). The doctors begin the ECT, which induces a seizure in Anna.

== Cast and characters ==
- Viktoriya Isakova as Anna Zimmina, an FSB analyst in the FSB's Counterterrorism Center
- Vladimir Mashkov as Alexey Bragin, a retired Marines corps colonel who is rescued by Spetsnaz GRU after being held by Chechen terrorists as a prisoner of war for six years
- Sergei Makovetsky as Colonel Mikhail Volskiy, Anna's mentor
- Andrey Merzlikin as Oleg Basov, a member of the State Duma
- Yuri Yakovlev Sukhanov as Yuri Khamzin
- Maria Mironova as Elena, Bragin's wife
- Sophia Khilkova as Katya Bragina
- Vladimir Vdovichenkov as Dmitry Bragin
- Valeriu Andriuta – Bin Jalid

== Broadcast ==
The series was produced by Timur Weinstien's WeiT Media Production company and the first episode was premiered on Monday, March 16, 2015, on Russia-1 Federal Channel.

== Production ==
Filming began in February 2014 in Moscow and Moscow Oblast.

== Episodes ==
No.	Directed by	Written by	Original release date
1	Pavel Lungin	Timur Weinstein	March 16, 2015
An employee of the FSB's Counter-Terrorism Center Anna Zimina learns that Chechen nationalists recruited a Russian officer and they are preparing a terrorist attack. A few years later, during the raid freed from captivity GRU Major Alexei Bragin. Anna suspects that Bragin is the recruited agent and puts him under covert surveillance.
2	Pavel Lungin	Unknown	March 17, 2015
Anna gets overwhelming evidence that the famous terrorist Bin Jalid, who was believed to be dead, is actually alive. Bragin struggles getting readjusted to civilian life and having a normal relationship with his children. Anna discovers that he occasionally goes to the garage, for an unknown reason.
3	Pavel Lungin	Unknown	March 17, 2015
The Bragin family is preparing for an interview for the national television channel. But the situation is heating up for their daughter Katya, who knows about the love affair that her mother Yelena has with her uncle, Dmitry, while Yelena blames Alexei for treason. Katya goes out to party with her friends and ends up in jail. Bragin uses his fame to spring his daughter.
4	Pavel Lungin	Unknown	March 18, 2015
Anna finds out that the head of security for a Qatari prince visited one of the Hawala's centers. In one of the photographs made during surveillance, Anna's boss, Volsky, recognised his former student.
5	Pavel Lungin	Unknown	March 18, 2015
FSB officers capture Latifah. During questioning, Latifah reveals some information but she is found dead of suspected suicide. Meanwhile, Dmitry wants to return to Yelena. For this, he establishes a warm relationship with his nephew, Vanya, who treats him better than to own father.
6	Pavel Lungin	Unknown	March 19, 2015
In an effort to prove Bragin's involvement of in Latifah's death, Anna convinces the authorities to do a polygraph with everyone who was at the interrogation. Yelena and Bragin grow even further away from each other. Their family is on the verge of collapse. Bragin walks into a bar, where he meets Anna.
7	Pavel Lungin	Unknown	23 March 2015
After the polygraph exam, Anna and Bragin travel to the suburbs to develop their affair. But soon Bragin discovers that Anna was spying on him. Yulia goes to the border and Volskiy succeeds in convince her to help the FSB in finding the Russian military officer who is betraying his country. But the portrait does not show Bragin.
8	Pavel Lungin	Unknown	24 March 2015
Bragin recover his family's relationship and he goes with his wife to a celebration event of Basov's Party. Anna become aware to the fact that Yuri Khamzin is alive. Bragin can't believe in this and he goes to meet Aziz, one of Bin Jalid's people.
9	Pavel Lungin	Unknown	24 March 2015
Anna leads operation to find Yuri Khamzin and soon FSB Officers find a car with diplomatic plates. Bin Jalid calls to Bragin to remind him something.
10	Pavel Lungin	Unknown	25 March 2015
Basov ask Bragin to join to his Party. Bragin consulting with his wife and daughter and decides to agree. He ask Anna to keep in secret their relationship. Anna tried to catch Khamzin but all goes not according to plan.
11	Pavel Lungin	Unknown	25 March 2015
Basov is informed about the possibility the Bin Jalil he's still alive. Anna begin to collect a specific information about Bin Jalid's plans.
12	Pavel Lungin	Pavel Lungin	26 March 2015
Bragin prepared for his mission. He recorded his message that explains his motives. His daughter, Katya, understand that something is wrong with him and tried to convince him not to go to the Basov's speech. Bragin getting dressed and goes to the Kremlin.

== Criticism ==
Rodina earned high popularity with audiences. According to Newsweek, TV critics noted similarities with the plot and episode structure of the American adaptation Homeland, but also criticized the series for "failing to tackle major modern-day political themes." While Homeland criticized the US government and the use of force in civilian areas of war zones, Rodina avoided criticism directed at the Kremlin, which Newsweek reports is "because the television producers wish to avoid any retaliation or criticism from the Russian authorities."
