= Desperate for Marriage =

- Directed by: Sonya Karpunina
- Written by: Sonya Karpunina
- Produced by: Alena Kremer; George Shabanov; Miloš Biković; Klim Shipenko; Alya Somkina; Aleksey Golodnitsky; Nonna Aristarkhova; Diana Petrenko; Denis Dubovik
- Starring: Miloš Biković; Kristina Asmus; Sergey Gilyov; Marina Aleksandrova; Yuliya Aug; Oleg Komarov; Anastasiya Ukolova; Agniya Kuznetsova
- Cinematography: Yuri Nikogosov
- Edited by: Anna Bespalova; Mariya Sergeenkova; Avet Oganesyan
- Production companies: Peak Media; START Studio
- Distributed by: Central Partnership
- Release date: March 5, 2022
- Running time: 106 minutes
- Country: Russia
- Language: Russian
- Box office: $3,878,443

Desperate for Marriage (Russian: Хочу замуж, romanized: Khochu zamuzh, lit. 'Want to Get Married') is a 2022 Russian romantic comedy-drama film written and directed by Sonya Karpunina. The action takes place in Kaliningrad, the plot is built around a successful TV channel presenter, whose life changes after a chance acquaintance, the film stars Miloš Biković, Kristina Asmus, Sergey Gilyov, and Marina Alexandrova.

Desperate for Marriage was scheduled to be theatrically released on March 5, 2022, by Central Partnership.

== Plot ==
For the journalist named Lyuba, everything is going according to plan: the work of the presenter on the TV channel, the successful and wealthy fiance Robert. The plan goes to hell when Lyuba’s phone goes down, and she asks to call a random passerby from the phone. It turned out to be Sergei, who also had a calm and measured life until that day. This meeting will launch a series of events that will completely change the life of Lyuba, and Sergei, and themselves.

== Cast ==
- Miloš Biković as Sergei Navashin
- Kristina Asmus as Lyubov "Lyuba" Yudina
- Sergey Gilyov as Robert Morozov
- Marina Aleksandrova as Inga Raevskaya
- Yuliya Aug as Anna Yudina
- Oleg Komarov as Rector
- Anastasiya Ukolova as Margarita Klementieva
- Agniya Kuznetsova as Karina
- Nadezhda Sysoeva as Anastasia Stezhko
- Anna Tsukanova-Kott as Natali
- Yevgeniya Akhremenko as an employee of the registry office
- Danila Yakushev as Andrei
- Lusia Chebotina as paraglider

== Production ==
Sonya Karpunina is the director and her husband Klim Shipenko is the creative producer. He will also act as a producer of the film together with Alena Kremer and George Shabanov. The project is filmed by Peak Media film production in partnership with START Studio video service.

Miloš Biković also acts as a producer of the film, together with director Klim Shipenko, with whom they worked on the Serf (film).

=== Filming ===
Principal photography began on June 1, 2021, will last until mid-summer and will be held in Moscow, and picturesque places in Kaliningrad, Russia. Some of the scenes were filmed at the Kaliningrad Oblast Museum of Fine Arts, in the nearby square, and on Uglovaya and Pugacheva streets.

== Release ==
=== Marketing ===
The first teaser trailer of Desperate for Marriage was released on January 18, 2022.

=== Theatrical ===
The actors attended a special screening on March 4, in Svetlogorsk, Kaliningrad Oblast. It is scheduled to be theatrically released in the Russian Federation on March 5, 2022, by Central Partnership.
