= Palma 2 =

- Directed by: Vladimir Kandaurov; Aleksandr Domogarov
- Written by: Ekaterina Mavromatis; Aleksandr Domogarov Jr.; Liza Tsyganova
- Produced by: Ruben Dishdishyan; Anton Zlatopolsky; Yuliya Ivanova; Nataliya Klibanova; Yasmina Ben Ammar; Narek Martirosyan; Kristina Reylyan; Dmitry Avidon; Armen Harutyunyan; Maria Lozovskaya; Anna Ushakova; Anzhelika Yudakova; Andrey Korobov; Aleksandr Domogarov Jr.; Anika Galina; Bema Nuradinova; Ksenia Kiseleva
- Starring: Viktor Dobronravov; Vladimir Ilyin; Leonid Basov; Valeriya Fedorovich; Evgeniya Dmitrieva; Igor Khripunov; Sergey Gilyov
- Cinematography: Sergey Dyshuk
- Music by: Ivan Burlyaev; Dmitry Noskov
- Production companies: Mars Media Entertainment; AMedia (ru); Russia-1; Okko Studios; Cinema Fund
- Distributed by: Central Partnership
- Release date: March 20, 2025 (Russia)
- Running time: 127 minutes
- Country: Russia
- Language: Russian
- Budget: ₽360 million
- Box office: ₽512 million

Palma 2, also known as A Dog Named Palma 2 (Russian: Пальма 2) is a 2025 Russian children's drama film directed by Vladimir Kandaurov and Aleksandr Domogarov, a sequel to the 2021 film A Dog Named Palma.

It was released theatrically on March 20, 2025, by Central Partnership.

== Plot ==
Pilot Vyacheslav Lazarev retires from aviation and moves to the outback with his family, continuing to fly there, but now on a small plane. Everything is going well for them, until a small bear cub appears in their lives. Suddenly, the bear is kidnapped by a group of poachers, and the dog, Palma, comes to his aid...

== Cast ==
- Viktor Dobronravov as Vyacheslav Lazarev, pilot
- Leonid Basov as Kolya Lazarev
- Vladimir Ilyin as Sergey Tikhonov, an airport technician
- Valeriya Fedorovich as Nina Tikhonova
- Evgeniya Dmitrieva as Lyubov Zhurina, head of the flight detachment
- Igor Khripunov as Evgeny Golikov, head of security
- Sergey Gilyov as Ivan Frolov
- Taisya Kalinina as Dasha
- Valery Skorokosov as a forester
- Ivan Agapov as Kinash
- Sergey Belyaev as Lyokha
- Marat Akhmetshin as Stepan, a hunter
- Mikhail Konovalov as a hunter
- Nikita Plakhotnyuk as Vasya
- Andrey Komolov as Vitaly, a hunter

== Production ==
=== Filming ===
Principal photography of the film took place from August to November 2023 at the Gorki Leninskiye Museum-Reserve in the Moscow Oblast and the Perm Krai.

== Release ==
The film's release, originally scheduled for October 24, 2024, was moved to March 20, 2025.
