= The Ballad of Uhlans =

- Theatrical release poster
- Directed by: Oleg Fesenko
- Screenplay by: Gleb Shprigov
- Produced by: Arunas Baraznauskas (operator); Gleb Shprigov
- Starring: Sergei Bezrukov; Anna Chipovskaya; Anton Sokolov; Vladimir Gostyukhin
- Music by: Sergei Chuprov (sound)
- Production company: Central Partnership
- Distributed by: Central Partnership
- Release date: 1 November 2012
- Running time: 100 minutes
- Country: Russia
- Languages: Russian; French
- Budget: US$5 million (150 Million Ruble)

The Ballad of Uhlans (Уланская баллада) is a 2012 Russian historical adventure film directed by Oleg Fesenko, and stars Sergei Bezrukov, Anna Chipovskaya, Anton Sokolov and Vladimir Gostyukhin.

The Ballad of Uhlans was released on 1 November 2012 in Russia.

== Plot ==
In 1812, on the eve of the decisive Battle of Borodino, a French secret agent steals a battle plan of the Russian troops. This fact is known to General Kutuzov, thanks to a young nobleman named Alexey Tarusov. Tarusov joins a regiment of Russian lancers, and finds new friends and together they have many adventures...

== Cast ==
- Sergei Bezrukov - (Go) Rzhevskiy
- Anna Chipovskaya - Panna Beata
- Anton Sokolov - Alexey Tarusov
- Vladimir Gostyukhin - Turusov Sr.
- Anatoliy Beliy - Knyaz Kiknadze
- Stanislav Duzhkinov - Ptukha
- Valery Nikolaev - De Vitt
- Olga Kabo - Martha
- Sergei Juravel - Mikhail Kutuzov
- Boris Klyuyev - Arkacheev
- Éric Fraticelli - Napoleon
- Dimitri Isayev - Alexander I
- Gedininas Adomaitis - Armand de Kolencour
- Paweł Deląg - Ledokhovskiy
- Alexei Makarov - Troitskiy
- Egor Pazenko - Uvarov
- Svetlana Metkina - Maria Valevskaya

== Home media ==
The Ballad of Uhlans was released on DVD and Blu-ray Disc in the Russian Federation in January 2013.
