= The Thaw (Russian TV series) =

- Genre: Drama
- Written by: Valery Todorovsky; Alyona Zvantsova; Dmitri Konstantinov
- Directed by: Valery Todorovsky
- Starring: Yevgeny Tsyganov; Aleksandr Yatsenko; Anna Chipovskaya
- Composer: Konstantin Meladze
- Country of origin: Russia
- Original language: Russian
- No. of series: 1
- No. of episodes: 12

Production
- Producers: Valery Todorovsky; Maksim Koroptsov; Elena Kozhanova
- Cinematography: Ivan Gudkov; Fyodor Lyass
- Production company: Marmot-Film

Original release
- Network: Channel One Russia
- Release: 2 December – 10 December 2013

The Thaw (Russian: Оттепель, romanized: Ottepel) is a Russian television series which debuted in 2013. Valery Todorovsky debuted as a TV director with it. The 12-episode series is a melodrama about life in the Soviet Union during the Khrushchev Thaw, specifically about film artists of the age. Relational is that Todorovsky's father worked on film in roughly this era. In the West the series has been compared to Mad Men in terms of tone and visuals, though the subject and plots are quite different.

== Plot ==
The series is set in 1961. Cameraman Viktor Khrustalyov is in a difficult situation; he is suspected of being involved in the death of his friend, talented screenwriter Kostya Parshin, who committed suicide during a drinking-bout. The authorities try to put Khrustalyov in prison by any means. Viktor needs to shoot the comedy "The Girl and the Brigadier" in order to get permission to make the film "Shards" after the wonderful scenario left from his deceased screenwriter friend. Young director Yegor Myachin wants to adapt this screenplay. Khrustalyov arranges him as a trainee to the venerable director Krivitsky for a comedy. In the same film act Khrustalev's ex-wife Inga and his young sweetheart Maryana, with whom Yegor Myachin is also in love.

== Cast ==
- Yevgeny Tsyganov — camera operator Viktor Khrustalyov
- Aleksandr Yatsenko — director-trainee Egor Ilich Myachin
- Anna Chipovskaya — student of the Moscow State University Mariana Pichugina
- Viktoriya Isakova — actress Inga Vitalevna Khrustaleva
- Mikhail Efremov — director Fyodor Andreevich Krivitsky
- Svetlana Kolpakova — wife of Krivitsky Nadia
- Jana Sexte — cameraperson Lusia Polynina
- Pavel Derevyanko — actor Gennady Petrovich Budnik
- Evgeny Volotsky — Mariana's brother, Tailor Alexander (Sancha) Pichugin
- Nina Dvorzhetskaya — second director Regina Markovna
- Victor Horinjak — actor Ruslan
- Anna Kotova — make-up artist Lida
- Paulina Andreeva — singer Dina
- Vladimir Gostyukhin — director of Mosfilm Semyon Vasilievich Pronin
- Vasily Mishchenko — investigator Tsanin
- Andrei Smirnov — father of Viktor, Sergey Viktorovich Khrustalev
- Larisa Malevannaya — grandmother Mariana Zoya Alexandrovna
- Olga Shtyrkova — Khrustalev's daughter Asya
- Fedor Lavrov — scriptwriter Kostya Parshin
- Nadezhda Markina — costume designer Olga Filippovna
- Valery Todorovsky — director
- Duta Skhirtladze — director of the film Giya Revazovich Taridze
- Evgeniya Khirivskaya — Larissa
- Konstantin Chepurin — requisitor Arkady Vladimirovich Somov
- Viktor Dobronravov — old friend of Khrustalev Peter
- Sophia Kashtanova — Sophia Loren
- Sergei Bondarchuk (junior) — Sergei Bondarchuk
- Nikita Yefremov — Oleg Yefremov
- Antonina Papernaya — Tatiana Samoilova
- Alexander Sutskover — lawyer
- Svetlana Nikiforova — make-up artist Zhenya
- Anastasia Prokofieva — dresser Elena
- Elena Melnikova — employee of the Model House
- Olga Klebanovich — secretary Pronina Lidia Ivanovna
- Nino Kantaria's — stepmother Victor Nina Khrustaleva
- Anastasia Popova — actress Oksana
- Fedot Lviv — requisitor Melon
- Andrey Zavyuk — Inga's lover Pavel
- Andrey Dushechkin — witness sound engineer
- Victor Molchan's — husband Regina Markovna Sergey
- Anastasia Zharkova — assistant to the director ("clapper")
- Irina Obidina — conductor
- Andrey Dudarenko — member of the artistic council Victor Moiseevich

== Awards ==
- 2014 - TEFI Award:
  - Best TV film / TV series
  - TV producer of the season - Valery Todorovsky
  - Best actor of a television film / series - Mikhail Efremov
- 2014 - Golden Eagle Award:
  - Best TV series (more than 10 episodes)
  - Best male role on television - Evgeny Tsyganov (for the role of Viktor Khrustalyov)
  - Best female role on television - Victoria Isakova (for the role of Inga Khrustalyova)
- 2015 - Award of the Government of the Russian Federation in the Field of Culture:
  - For the creation of the television series "The Thaw" - Valery Todorovsky, Dmitry Konstantinov, Alyona Zvantsova, Victoria Isakova, Evgeny Tsyganov
