= Yeltsin: Three Days in August =

- Film poster
- Written by: Oleg Antonov
- Directed by: Aleksandr Mokhov
- Starring: Dmitry Nazarov; Alexander Sirin; Vladimir Steklov; Felix Antipov; Vladimir Yumatov; Svetlana Antonova
- Music by: Alexander Pantykin
- Country of origin: Russia
- Original language: Russian

Production
- Producers: Alexey Pivovarov; Valentin Opalev
- Cinematography: Alexander Demidov
- Editor: Tatyana Ilyina
- Running time: 96 minutes

Original release
- Release: 16 September 2011

Yeltsin: Three Days in August (Russian: Ельцин. Три дня в августе, romanized: Eltsin. Tri dnya v avguste) is a 2011 political drama directed by Alexander Mokhov of the 1991 Soviet coup attempt.

== Plot ==
The film is based on the August 1991 attempted coup d'état in the Soviet Union. Preparations are under way for the signing of the Union Treaty. It becomes a question of changing the ruling elite in the country. The conspirators are blocking Mikhail Gorbachev at his dacha in Foros, after which they announce the formation of the State Committee on the State of Emergency. Vice President Gennady Yanayev is announced as Acting President of the Soviet Union.

Boris Yeltsin goes to the parliament building (the Russian White House), where he heads the opposition. A tough confrontation between Boris Yeltsin and the State Emergency Committee and his supporters begins ...

== Cast ==
The cast were as follows:

- Dmitry Nazarov as Boris Yeltsin
- Alexander Sirin as Vladimir Kryuchkov
- Vladimir Steklov as Pavel Grachev
- Felix Antipov as Dmitry Yazov
- Vladimir Yumatov as Mikhail Gorbachev
- Svetlana Antonova as Tatyana Dyachenko
- Sherkhan Abilov as Nursultan Nazarbayev
- Yelena Valyushkina as Naina Yeltsina
- Igor Staroselytsev as Alexander Rutskoy
- Alexander Klyukvin as Valentin Pavlov
- Pavel Danilov as Boris Pugo
- Elena Lyamina as Elena Okulova
- Alexander Shavrin as Gennady Yanayev
- Valentina Sharykina as Emma Yazova

== Criticism ==
- Тhree days and 20 years (in Russian)
