= Vladimir Steklov (actor) =

Russian actor (born 1948)

- Владимир Стеклов
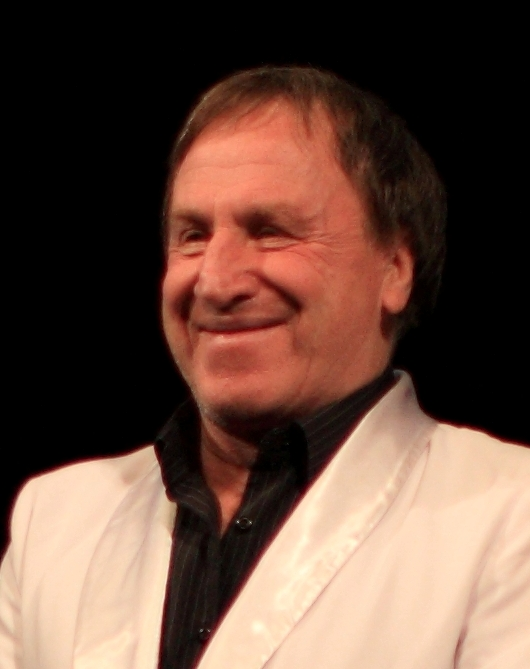
- Steklov in 2011
- Born: Vladimir Aleksandrovich Steklov; January 3, 1948 (age 78); Karaganda, Kazakh SSR, Soviet Union
- Occupation: Actor
- Years active: 1972

Vladimir Aleksandrovich Steklov (Russian: Владимир Алeксандрович Стеклов; born 3 January 1948) is a Russian actor.

== Biography ==
He graduated from the Astrakhan School of Theatre in 1970 and acted in more than 50 movies during his career. In 1999 he underwent basic cosmonaut training in preparation for visiting the MIR space station as a commercial guest to work on a film, but his trip was canceled.

Steklov has two children; one (Agrippina Steklova, born 1973) from his first marriage (to Lyudmila Moshchenskaya) and one (Glafira Steklova born 1997) by his current wife, Olga Semlyanova.

== Selected filmography ==
- Dead Souls (Мёртвые души, 1984) as Petrushka
- Wild Pigeon (Чужая белая и рябой, 1986) as Kolya the "Gypsy"
- Plumbum, or The Dangerous Game (Плюмбум, или опасная игра, 1987) as Lopatov
- The Prisoner of Château d'If (Узник замка Иф, 1988) as Bertuccio
- Gardemarines ahead! (Гардемарины, вперёд!, 1988) as Gusev
- My Best Friend, General Vasili, Son of Joseph Stalin (Мой лучший друг генерал Василий, сын Иосифа, 1991) as Vasili Josifovich Stalin
- The Inner Circle (1991) as Khrustalyev
- The Master and Margarita (Мастер и Маргарита, 1994) as Azazello
- Tycoon (Олигарх, 2002) as Belyenkiy
- Konservy (Консервы, 2007)
- Yeltsin: Three Days in August (Ельцин. Три дня в августе, 2011) as Pavel Sergeevich Grachov
- Gagarin: First in Space (Гагарин. Первый в космосе, 2013) as Nikolai Kamanin
- Molodezhka (Молодёжка, 2013-2017) as Ilya Romanovich Pakhomov
- Anyone but Them (Только не Они, 2018) as Mayor
- The One (2022 film) as Knyazev's supervisor
- 13 Clinical (13 Клиническая, 2022) as chief physician
