= The Junior Team =

- The 2013 release poster to season 1
- Genre: Comedy; Drama; Sport
- Created by: Vyacheslav Murugov
- Written by: Leonid Kuprido; Alexander Bulynko; Alexander Tykun; Sergei Olekhnik
- Directed by: Sergei Arlanov; Andrei Golovkov
- Starring: Alexander Sokolovsky Denis Nikiforov; Makar Zaporozhsky Ivan Zhvakin; Ivan Dubrovsky; Ivan Mulin; Vlad Kanopka; Igor Ogurtsov; Ilya Korobko
- Country of origin: Russia
- Original language: Russian
- No. of seasons: 6
- No. of episodes: 260

Production
- Producers: Vyacheslav Murugov; Fyodor Bondarchuk; Dmitry Tabarchuk; Dmitry Rudovsky; Daria Leygonie-Fialko
- Production location: Podolsk
- Running time: ~ 48 minutes
- Production company: Art Pictures Vision

Original release
- Network: Russia STS; STS International
- Release: October 7, 2013 – 2017

The Junior League (Russian: Молодёжка, romanized: Molodezhka) is a Russian TV series which airs on STS. The series tells the story of a junior hockey club named The Bears (Russian: Медведи Medvedi). The series was produced by Fyodor Bondarchuk and his Art Pictures Studio.

The first season was aired beginning on October 7, 2013. The second season was aired starting on November 17, 2014. The third season started filming since April 27, 2015, to October 19, 2015, and was aired since October 26, 2015, to February 26, 2016. The fourth season is aired on STS since October 17, 2016.

On November 19, 2016, the series was officially greenlighted for a 40-webisode fifth season. The series would then air a 5th season starting autumn 2017.

== Plot ==
The events take place in the town of Podolsk when The Bears hockey club hires a new coach, Sergei Makeyev, a former National Hockey League player, who sets out to get the club to the Junior Hockey League and make The Bears a successful team. It will be not easy, because the players do not feel as a whole, and work as individuals. In addition, they have other things to do: family, love life, and studies.

There are also those who are trying as quickly as possible to get rid of the new coach.

== Cast ==
=== Hockey teams players ===
==== The Bears ====
- Alexander Sokolovsky as Yegor "Shchuka" Andreyevich Shchukin, is a center forward, player number 10, The Bears` captain and main character. After injury, Yegor began to train amateur hockey team Nivea Men. Since episode 40, season 3, he becomes a coach of the team.
- Makar Zaporozhsky as Dmitry "Dima" Andreyevich Shchukin, is a goaltender, player number 1 and Yegor's brother. In episode 3, season 2, Dima had to leave The Bears forever because of hypertrophic cardiomyopathy. In episode 6, season 2, he went in Moscow to study in Bauman University
- Ivan Zhvakin as Alexander "Kostyor" Stanislavovich Kostrov, is a forward, player number 9
- Ivan Dubrovsky as Vadim "Nazar" Yurievich Nazarov, is a forward, player number 16
- Ivan Mulin as Anton Vladimirovich Antipov, is a forward, player number 17
- Vlad Kanopka as Andrei "Kisly" Viktorovich Kislyak, is a forward, player number 24
- Igor Ogurtsov as Semyon Nikolayevich Bakin, is a goaltender, player number 38
- Ilya Korobko as Mikhail Vasilievich Ponomaryov, is a defenceman, player number 95
- Mikhail Konov as Petrovsky
- Anton Mishin as Artyom Vorobyov, is a goalkeeper (since season 2, episodes 6 to 40)
- Matvei Zubalevich as Alexei "Smirny" Petrovich Smirnov, is a defenseman, player number 13 (since episode 13, season 2)
- Nikolai Alexeyev as Igor Gavrilov
- Nikita Yelenev as Denis Vasiliev, is a forward, player number 8 (since episode 6, season 3)
- Mikhail Gavrilov as Yevgeny "Tsar" Andreyevich Tsaryov, is a center forward, player number 45 (since episode 1, season 3)
- Pyotr Kovrizhnykh as Ilya "Beryoza" Berezin, is a forward, player number 47, former player of hockey club The Torch (since season 4)
- Andriy Pinzaru as Danila Bondar, is a defenseman, player number 11, former player of hockey club The Torch (since season 4)

==== Titan ====
- Yevgeny Kulik as Igor Drozd, is a center forward, player number 10, captain of the team
- Alexander Sokolovsky as Yegor Shchukin, is a center forward, player number 9 (in episodes 5–8, season 3)
- Ivan Dubrovsky as Vadim Nazarov, is a forward, player number 16
- Mikhail Gavrilov as Yevgeny Tsaryov, is a center forward, player number 45
- Ilya Korobko as Mikhail Ponomaryov, is a defenceman, player number 95

==== Ice Kings ====
- Nikita Yelenev as Denis Vasiliev, is a forward, player number 8 (since season 4)
- Vlad Kanopka as Andrei Kislyak, is a forward, player number 24 (since season 4)
- Ivan Mulin as Anton Antipov, is a forward, player number 17 (since season 4)
- Matvei Zubalevich as Alexei Smirnov, is a defenceman, player number 13 (since season 4, episode 14)
- Ilya Korobko as Mikhail Vasilievich Ponomaryov, is a defenceman, player number 95 (since season 4, episode 26)

=== Team managers and coaches ===
- Denis Nikiforov as Sergei Petrovich Makeyev, is a head coach of The Bears
- Fyodor Bondarchuk as Oleg Ivanovich Kalinin, is an oligarch and general sponsor of The Bears
- Vladimir Zaitsev as Vadim Yurievich Kazantsev, is a sportive director of The Bears (seasons 1 and 4)
- Pavel Smetankin as Anton Karmazin
- Anatoly Kot as Anatoly Leonidovich Zhilin, is a sportive director of The Bears (since episode 5, season 2)
- Svetlana Antonova as dr. Yelizaveta Andreyevna Krasnova
- Vladimir Steklov as Ilya Romanovich Pakhomov, is an owner and the general sponsor of the hockey team The Bears
- Vladimir Sterzhakov as Semyon Valerievich Krasnitsky, is a manager of the hockey club Ice Kings
- Maxim Shchyogolev as Alexander Valerievich Tochilin, is a former player of Czech hockey club Vityaz and second coach of The Bears
- Andrei Merzlikin as Maxim "Russian Bonecrusher" Eduardovich Streltsov, is a head coach of the hockey team Ice Kings, a former player of Canadian ice hockey club Ottawa Senators
- Mikhail Zhigalov as Stepan Arkadevich Zharsky, is a former coach of The Bears

=== Girls ===
- Anna Mikhaylovskaya as Yana Samoilova
- Maria Ivashchenko as Alina Morozova, is a former figure skater
- Yulia Margulis as Marina Kasatkina, is a captain of The Bears` support group, Yegor's girlfriend
- Maria Pirogova as Olga Belova, is a press secretary of The Bears, Anton Antipov's girlfriend

=== Parents ===
- Valentina Ananina as Larisa Arkadievna Savelieva, Mikhail Ponomaryov's grandmother
- Nikolai Dobrynin as Nikolai Semyonovich Bakin, Semyon Bakin's father
- Yelena Kravchenko as Yelena Konstantinovna Shchukina, the Shchukin's mother
- Vadim Andreev as Fyodor Mikhailovich Samoilov

=== Guest stars ===
- Viktor Gusev (cameo)
- Vyacheslav Fetisov (cameo)
- Alexei Morozov (cameo)

== Rating ==
The show became highly popular and was ranked by Rossiyskaya Gazeta as the fourth-best TV series for 2013.

== Production ==
The casting was held in Chelyabinsk, while all the games and training scenes were shot in Ice Hockey Hall in Podolsk. Filming took place in Samara, Tolyatti, Krasnoyarsk, Chelyabinsk and Mytishchi in Moscow Oblast.

The hockey scenes (in seasons 1 and 2) were managed by Yevgeny Polynskikh, who previously worked with Canadian specialists on the set of the movie Legend № 17.

== Books based on Molodezhka ==
In October 2013, Eksmo released first book called "Molodezhka:The First Match" (Russian: Молодёжка.Первый матч) written by Yekaterina Nevolina based on the first season of the series. On January 12, 2015, Eksmo released second book called "Molodezhka:Chance for a Victory" (Russian: Молодёжка.Шанс на победу) written by Anna Antonova based on the second season of the series.
