= Piranha (2006 film) =

- Directed by: Andrey Kavun
- Screenplay by: Dmitry Zverkov
- Based on: Piranya protiv vorov 2004 novel by Aleksandr Bushkov
- Produced by: Valery Todorovsky; Ilya Neretin
- Starring: Vladimir Mashkov; Svetlana Antonova; Yevgeny Mironov
- Cinematography: Roman Vasyanov
- Edited by: Aleksey Bobrov
- Music by: Dmitry Taravkov; Vitaliy Artist
- Production company: Rekun TV
- Distributed by: Central Partnership
- Release date: 6 April 2006
- Running time: 167 min
- Country: Russia
- Language: Russian

Piranha (Russian: Охота на пиранью, romanized: lit. The hunt for piranha) is a 2006 Russian action film directed by Andrey Kavun.

== Plot ==
Under the guise of a joint holiday, police agent Kirill Mazur and his colleague Olga are sent to the Siberian taiga to liquidate a chemical weapons laboratory flooded at the bottom of the lake in a territory that will soon be abandoned to neighboring China.

== Cast ==
- Vladimir Mashkov as Mazur
- Svetlana Antonova as Olga
- Yevgeny Mironov as Prokhor
- Viktoriya Isakova as Sinilga
- Sergei Garmash as Zima
- Andrey Merzlikin as Shtabs
- Mikhail Yefremov as Dorokhov
- Alexey Gorbunov as Kuzmich
- Anna Banshchikova as Viktoriya
- Alexander Sirin as doctor
- Anna Ukolova as Nina

== Awards ==
- MTV Russia Movie Awards — best movie villain (Yevgeny Mironov)
