= Marina Aleksandrova =

Russian actress (born 1982)

- Марина Александрова
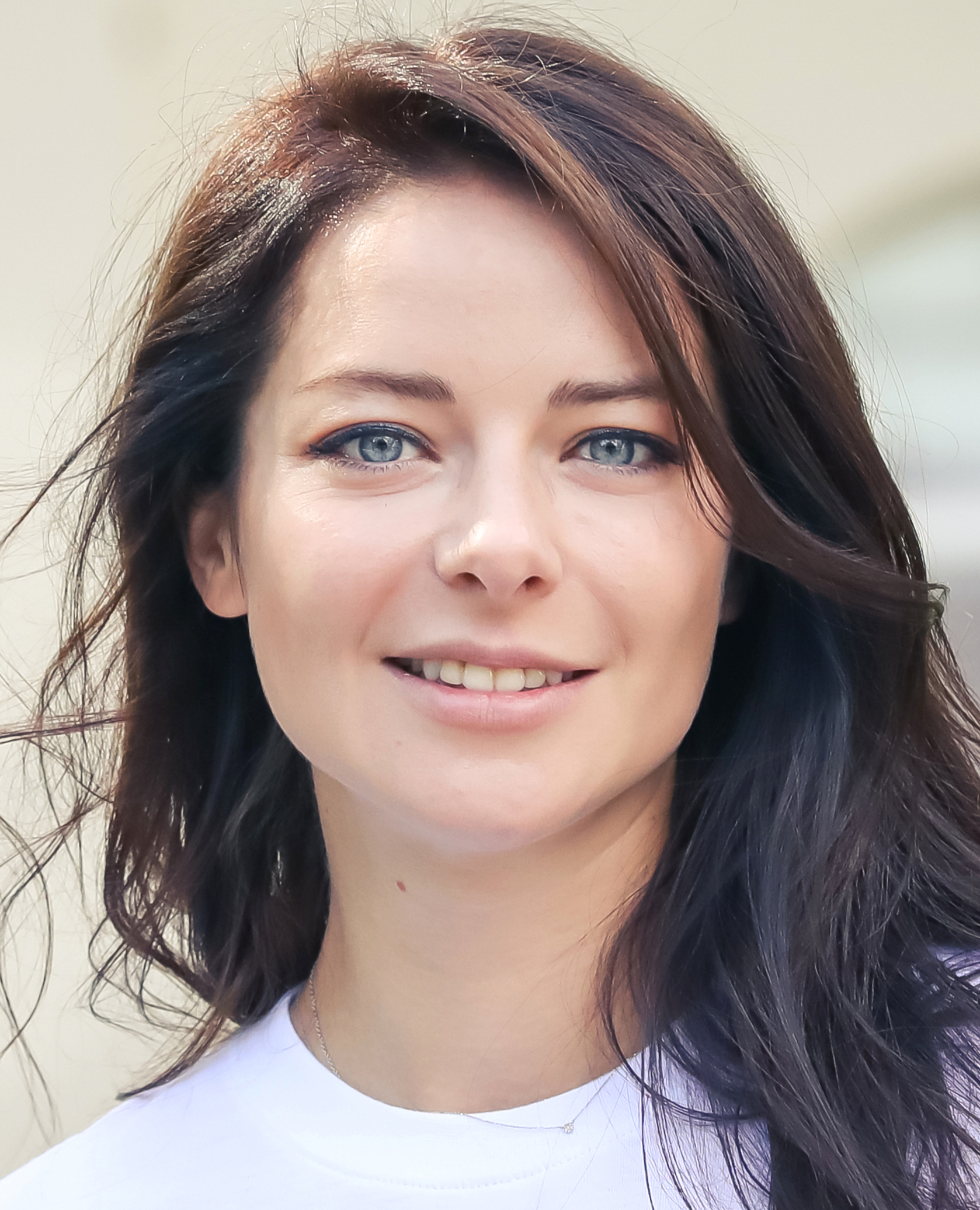
- Aleksandrova in 2019
- Born: Marina Andreevna Pupenina; 29 August 1982 (age 43); Kiskunmajsa, Hungary
- Citizenship: Russian
- Occupation: Actress
- Years active: 1992–present
- Spouses: Ivan Stebunov (m. 2008; div. 2010); Andrey Boltenko
- Children: 2

Marina Andreevna Pupenina, known by her pseudonym Marina Aleksandrova (Russian: Мари́на Андре́евна Пупе́нина; born 29 August 1982), is a Russian actress. She is known for her portrayal of Catherine the Great in the television series Ekaterina.

== Biography ==
Aleksandrova was born Marina Andreevna Pupenina on 29 August 1982 in the Hungarian town of Kiskunmajsa. Her father, Andrei Pupenin, served in the Soviet Army, stationed in Hungary. In 1986, the family moved to Lake Baikal and then Tula. In 1987, they settled in what was then Leningrad, where Aleksandrova's mother worked as a professor at Herzen University. Aleksandrova graduated from high school with specialisations in mathematics and music (harp) in 1996. The same year, she joined the Imagine Drama School and the Shukin Theatre School under Valentina Nikolaenko.

Aleksandrova worked for the Sovremennik Theatre in Moscow from 2006 to 2011. She is an Honored Artist of the Russian Federation (2016).

== Personal life ==
In 2008, Aleksandrova married actor Ivan Stebunov, whom she divorced in 2010. Aleksandrova later married director Andrey Boltenko, whom she met in 2011. The couple have two children, a son (b. 2012) and a daughter (b. 2015).

== Filmography ==
Year	Title	Role	Notes
1992	Weather Is Good on Deribasovskaya, It Rains Again on Brighton Beach	Little Girl	Cameo appearance
2000	Empire under Attack	Maria Stolypina	Television film
2001	Aurora Borealis	Anya	
2001	Azazel	Lizanka von Evert–Kolokoltseva	Television film
2002	Le Médecin malgré lui	Woman	Television film
2002	Leading Roles	Marina	TV series
2002	The Thief	Yulia Balashova	TV series
2003	An Ancient Tale: When the Sun Was a God	Dziwa	
2003	Poor Nastya	Marie of Hesse and by Rhine	TV series
2004	La fonte des neiges	Léna	Television film
2004	Viola Tarakanova	Tomocka	TV series
2004	The Nutcracker	Masha (voice)	
2005	You Are My Happiness	Polina Gayvoronskaya	TV series
2005	Star of the era	Valentina Sedova	Miniseries
2005	Love for You is Like a Disaster	Herself	
2006	The Last Armoured Train	Toma	
2006	Transit	Woman	
2008	Street Racers	Doker's Girl (Katya)	
2009	The Weather Station	Irina	
2009	Clouds Over the Hill	Ariadna Kovalskaya	TV series
2011	All Inclusive	Anna	
2011	The Rules of the Masquerade	Anya	Miniseries
2012	Sniper 2: Tungus	Lubov Azarina	Television film
2014	Executioner	Sonya Timofeeva	Miniseries
2014-23	Ekaterina	Catherine the Great	TV series (4 seasons)
2015	Spider	Sonya Timofeeva	TV series
2018	Operation Satan	Sonya Timofeeva	Miniseries
2018	House Arrest	Marina Bylinkina	TV series
2020	Psycho	Sasha	TV series
2022	Desperate for Marriage	Inga Raevskaya	
2024	Macron	Vika	TV series
