= 13 Clinical =

- 13 Клиническая
- Genre: Medical drama Mystery
- Written by: Andrey Zolotaryov
- Directed by: Klim Kozinsky
- Starring: Danila Kozlovsky; Paulina Andreeva; Viktoriya Isakova; Vladimir Steklov
- Country of origin: Russia
- Original language: Russian
- No. of seasons: 1
- No. of episodes: 8

Production
- Production companies: Team Films; INEY Production

Original release
- Network: IVI
- Release: December 22, 2022 – present

13 Clinical (13 Клиническая) is a Russian mystery television series produced by the streaming service IVI in collaboration with Team Films and INEY Production. The series premiered in December 2022. It stars Danila Kozlovsky, Paulina Andreeva, Viktoriya Isakova, and Vladimir Steklov.

== Premise ==
The series follows Kirill, a young but highly respected surgeon who is diagnosed with a brain tumor. On the recommendation of a colleague, he visits a clinic known for its unconventional treatment methods. After an examination, the hospital’s chief physician invites Kirill to join the clinic both as a patient and as a staff member.

Each episode tells a self-contained story about one of the clinic’s patients, whose afflictions are not conventional medical conditions but manifestations of demons. According to screenwriter Andrey Zolotaryov, an entire classification of demons was created for the series, with each demon representing a specific illness and interacting with patients in unique ways.

== Cast ==
- Danila Kozlovsky as Kirill Akinshin, a surgeon
- Viktoriya Isakova as Irina Lvovna, head of department
- Vladimir Steklov as the chief physician
- Paulina Andreeva as Anya, a therapist
- Nino Ninidze as Rita, a patient
- Dmitry Lysenkov as Klim, a Ministry of Health official
- Kristina Babushkina as Natasha, a patient

== Production ==
Filming began in April 2022. The series was presented at the Pilot television festival in summer 2022, with its official premiere taking place on IVI in December 2022.

The hospital building was constructed on a dedicated soundstage, while additional scenes were filmed at the Institute of Bioorganic Chemistry of the Russian Academy of Sciences in Moscow.

According to the creators, a professional surgeon served as a consultant during filming to ensure medical authenticity.

== Reception ==
Critics generally praised the series for its originality and genre-blending approach.

Ivan Afanasyev of 7 Days described the show as “surprisingly fresh,” noting that it subverts expectations by mixing humor, horror, and supernatural elements in unconventional ways.

Roman Cherkasov of Vedomosti highlighted the strength of the screenplay, praising its combination of everyday hospital life with mythological fantasy.

Maxim Yershov of Film.ru noted that while the series follows a procedural structure, it stands out for its visual effects, unusual situations, and strong performances, particularly by Isakova, Andreeva, and Kozlovsky.

== Prequel ==
In February 2024, filming was completed on a prequel titled 13 Clinical: The Beginning, which explores the origins of the mysterious clinic during the 1970s, when it was established on the basis of a conventional research institute. The prequel was written by Andrey Zolotaryov and directed by Ilya Ermolov. It stars Irina Starshenbaum, Sergey Gilyov, Pavel Priluchny, and Viktoriya Isakova.

== Awards ==
The series received an award at the New Season Festival, where Danila Kozlovsky won Best Actor.
