= Centaur (2023 film) =

- Directed by: Kirill Kemnits
- Written by: Mikhail Zubko
- Produced by: Ilya Naishuller; Dmitry Litvinov; Ekaterina Kononenko; Elvira Dmitrievskaya; Mikhail Zubko; Kirill Kemnits
- Starring: Yuri Borisov; Anastasia Talyzina; Sergey Gilyov; Grigory Vernik
- Cinematography: Robert Sarukhanyan
- Music by: Darya Charusha
- Production companies: ID Production; Okko Studios; Planeta Inform; Versus Pictures
- Distributed by: Cinema Atmosphere
- Release date: July 13, 2023
- Running time: 101 minutes
- Country: Russia
- Language: Russian
- Budget: ₽110 million
- Box office: ₽123 million, $ 1,3 million

Centaur (Russian: Кентавр, romanized: Kentavr) is a Russian road movie directed by Kirill Kemnits, it stars Yuri Borisov and Anastasia Talyzina, also in the cast are Sergei Gilev and Grigory Vernik. It was theatrically released on July 13, 2023.

== Plot ==
On an April night in Moscow, young taxi driver Sasha begins his shift, greeting a familiar traffic inspector and heading into the city. Preferring the night shift, Sasha believes people show their true colors after dark. His first fare, a businessman with a suitcase, is quickly assessed by Sasha as likely cheating on his wife. He later picks up a young man whom he questions about cryptocurrency, and when the man leaves, Sasha finds he’s left behind a lighter. Things shift when Sasha picks up Liza, an escort needing rides to multiple locations, promising generous payment. During the journey, Sasha reveals he has a disability, though his reasons change each time he mentions it, hinting at a concealed past.

The ride takes a darker turn as they make stops around the city. While waiting for Liza outside a wealthy mansion, Sasha spots a woman on a balcony and is spooked by a strange man who approaches him. The tension builds when Liza notices a blood-stained phone on the floor of the taxi. She excuses herself to hand off money but instead meets two men who reveal the true stakes: Sasha is a key suspect in the recent murders of escorts, as the locations of their bodies match his routes. Under threat, the men force Liza to continue the ride and gather evidence against Sasha, warning that her own legal troubles depend on her compliance. Trapped in an unfolding nightmare, Liza must weigh her own survival against the fear of the man behind the wheel.

== Cast ==
- Yuri Borisov as Sasha, a cab driver
- Anastasia Talyzina as Liza
- Sergey Gilyov as Kovalev
- Grigory Vernik as major, a taxi passenger
- Kseniya Kutepova as major's mother
- Ivan Mamonov as mother's bodyguard
- Kirill Melekhov as Kovalev's partner
- Oleg Evteev as a traffic inspector
- Timofei Fyodorov as a taxi passenger

== Production ==
The project was presented as part of the full-time defense of copyright and experimental films for support by the Ministry of Culture of the Russian Federation in 2022. The creators of the tape plan to spend about 110 million rubles on production, 50 million of which they want to receive as part of state support for domestic cinema.

== Release ==
=== Marketing ===
The first teaser trailer of Centaur was released on April 28, 2023.

== Reception ==
=== Critical response ===
The film received mixed reviews. Many critics have pointed to the external resemblance of Centaur with Taxi Driver (1976 film) by Martin Scorsese and Drive (2011 film) by Nicolas Winding Refn.
