= Street Racers (film) =

- Theatrical release poster
- Directed by: Oleg Fesenko
- Screenplay by: Andrei Libenson; Anush Vardanyan; Oleg Fesenko
- Produced by: Sergey Danielyan; Ruben Dishdishyan; Yuri Moroz
- Starring: Aleksey Chadov; Marina Aleksandrova; Stanislav Bondarenko
- Cinematography: Arunas Baraznauskas
- Edited by: Vitaly Vinogradov
- Production company: Turtle Film Studio
- Distributed by: Central Partnership
- Release date: March 6, 2008 (Russia)
- Running time: 109 minutes
- Country: Russia
- Language: Russian
- Budget: $5 million
- Box office: $6.011 million

Street Racers (Russian: Стритрейсеры, romanized: Stritreysery) is a 2008 Russian action film directed by Oleg Fesenko.

== Plot ==
Stepan returns from the army. His father’s auto shop is now owned by a certain Docker who organizes street racing. Street racing is not a goal, but a way of life, a passion that unites all kinds of people. Even such as Stepan and Docker. They are similar: both do not just love cars do not think of life without speed and risk. But the principles of one are empty words for another, and therefore a collision is inevitable. Especially as Stepan falls in love with Katya, Docker's girlfriend.

== Cast ==
- Aleksey Chadov as Stepan
- Marina Aleksandrova as Katya
- Stanislav Bondarenko as Docker
- Nikolai Chindyajkin as Lieutenant Colonel Stepanchenko, Katya's father
- Elvira Bolgova as Laura
- Aleksei Guskov as auto mechanic Mokhov, Stepan's father
- Alexander Slastin as Sergey Petrovich, General, Chief of the State Traffic Safety Inspectorate

== Criticism ==
The film was noted by critics as an unsuccessful attempt at a repeat success of Fast and the Furious.
