= Man from Podolsk =

- Film poster
- Directed by: Semyon Serzin
- Written by: Yulia Lukshina; Dmitry Danilov
- Produced by: Natalia Mokritskaya; Mila Rozanova
- Starring: Vadik Korolyov; Viktoriya Isakova; Vladimir Mayzinger; Mikhail Kasapov; Ilya Borisov
- Cinematography: Daniil Fomichev
- Music by: Dmitry Shugaykin; Yaroslav Timofeyev
- Production company: Novye liudi
- Release date: 26 November 2020
- Running time: 92 minutes
- Country: Russia
- Language: Russian

Man from Podolsk (Russian: Человек из Подольска, romanized: Chelovek iz Podolska) is a 2020 Russian comedy-drama film directed by Semyon Serzin.

== Plot ==
The film, based on the eponymous play by Dmitry Danilov, follows Nikolai, a resident of Podolsk who dreams of a music career and harbors a deep fondness for Amsterdam, despite his modest life working at a local newspaper. His routine is shattered when he is unexpectedly detained by the Moscow police, leading him into a surreal and unsettling experience. The police officers, who appear to be intellectuals in uniform, possess an unnerving knowledge of his personal life and subject him to bizarre interrogations that blend humor and fear. Trapped in this strange scenario, Nikolai is left questioning his surroundings, unsure of where he is or what the outcome of his detention will be.

== Cast ==
- Vadik Korolyov as Frolov
- Viktoriya Isakova as Marina
- Vladimir Mayzinger as first policeman
- Mikhail Kasapov as second policeman
- Ilya Borisov as man from Mytishchi
- Oleg Ryazantsev as doctor
- Yevgeny Sangadzhiyev as Zhenya
- Georgy Kudrenko as Gosha
- Rita Kron as Rita
- Taisiya Vilkova as Galya
