= Sergey Gilyov =

Russian actor

- Сергей Гилёв
- Born: Sergey Anatolyevich Gilyov; 12 October 1979 (age 47); Izhevsk, Udmurt ASSR, RSFSR, USSR (now Udmurtia, Russia)
- Citizenship: Russian
- Occupation: Actor
- Years active: 2017–present

Sergey Anatolyevich Gilyov (Russian: Сергей Анатольевич Гилёв; born 12 October 1979) is a Russian film actor, formerly a journalist and blogger.

== Biography ==
After school, he studied briefly at the Izhevsk Agricultural Academy and the Faculty of Journalism at Russian State University for the Humanities, but dropped out of both.

He worked as a radio DJ in Izhevsk, then moved to Moscow, initially working as a loader. He began developing internet projects and ran the blogging platform "Tribuna" on Sports.ru, and for five years managed the social media of the educational website "Mel".

In 2012, he completed a course in "Dramatic Theatre and Film Acting" at the Herman Sidakov Drama School. He participated in several theatre productions and took small film roles while continuing to work in internet marketing.

He fully devoted himself to acting in 2020 after the success of Eduard Oganesyan's series Chiki, in which he played a supporting role.

An amateur painter, he works with acrylic and oil. He has exhibited and sold his work in New York.

== Personal life ==
His wife is Ekaterina Dmitrieva, an editor. They married in 2021. Their son was born in 2022.

== Filmography ==
=== Film ===
- 2021 – Aeterna. Part One as Father Herman
- 2021 – Nuuchcha as Kostya
- 2022 – First Snow as Roma
- 2022 – 1941. Wings over Berlin as Vydrin
- 2022 – Desperate for Marriage as Robert Morozov
- 2023 – Tin Head as Karin
- 2023 – Centaur as Kovalyov
- 2023 – Patient No. 1 as Young man
- 2025 – The Poet as Alexander Kristoforovich Benckendorf
- 2025 – Palma 2 as Ivan Frolov
- TBA – December as Wolf Iosifovich Erlich (unreleased)

=== Television ===
- 2017 – Policeman from Rublyovka in Beskudnikovo as Vika's fiancé
- 2018 – Eyes to Eyes as Andrey Borovko
- 2019 – Detective Syndrome as Jewelry Store Guard
- 2020 – Passengers as Kirill
- 2020 – Chiki as Danila
- 2021 – Contact as Makar
- 2021 – Food Unit as Ruslan Maksimovich Zakhvatkin
- 2021 – Last Minister-2 as Yegor Fyodorovich Baranov
- 2021 – Gold Diggers-3 as Fyodor Kvitko
- 2021 – Crystal as Golovchenko
- 2021 – Trigger-2 as Investigator
- 2022 – Aurora as Lapshin
- 2022 – Passengers: Last Love on Earth as Kirill
- 2022 – Shaman as Oleg
- 2022 – Black Spring as Stanislav Kudinov
- 2023 – Fisher as Gennady Maltsev
- 2023 – Death of a Mannequin as Boris Leshchinsky
- 2023 – Actresses as Stepan
- 2024 – Survivors as Rinal
- 2024 – Inside the Killer as Kirill Lvov
- 2024 – Children of Change as Heinrich Ivanovich
- 2024 – Pharma as Al Pacino
- 2024 – 13 Clinical. The Beginning as Gleb Alekseevich
