= The Ivanovs vs. The Ivanovs =

2017 Russian TV series

- Genre: Sitcom
- Written by: Vitaly Shlyappo, Alexey Mihnovich, Alexey Tatarenko, Nikita Gerfanov, Alexey Lebedev, Stanislav Tlyashev, Artyom Milovanov
- Directed by: Anton Fedotov; Andrew Alison; Fyodor Stukov; Sergey Znamensky
- Country of origin: Russia
- Original language: Russian
- No. of seasons: 7
- No. of episodes: 132

Production
- Producers: Anton Fedotov; Vyacheslav Murugov; Daria Lagoni-Fialko; Edward Iloyan; Vitaly Shlyappo; Alexey Trotsyuk
- Running time: 24 minutes

Original release
- Network: STS
- Release: 16 October 2017 – present

The Ivanovs vs. The Ivanovs (Russian: Ивановы-Ивановы, romanized: Ivanovy-Ivanovy) is a Russian TV series produced since 2017. Made by "Yellow, Black and White" (episodes 1 to 40) and "Pick Up Film" film companies. The series has very high television ratings and has won award "TEFI". One of the producers in seasons 1-2 was a Ukrainian media executive Daria Leygonie-Fialko.

== Plot ==
Two Voronezh families of different incomes learn that in the maternity hospital each of them accidentally mixed up children. After 16 years, adults decide to restore historical justice. Now Ivan has to learn to survive in the house of his poor biological parents, and Danila — to get acquainted with the rules of behavior in a secular society.

Soon the house of poor Ivanovs burns down, and they settle under one roof with rich Ivanovs. The joint life of two families is not easy. However, they still manage to come to compromises. At the same time, parents get closer to their "new" sons, but do not forget about the "former".

== Cast and characters ==
=== Main ===
==== Rich Ivanovs ====
- Alexey Lukin as Ivan (biological son of Alexey and Lydia Ivanov, son of Anton and Polina Ivanov; schoolboy (up to ep. 41) / student (since ep. 42))
- Sergey Burunov as Anton (Polina's husband, businessman)
- Alexandra Florinskaya as Polina (Anton's wife, socialite)
- Stanislav Duzhnikov as Boris, Anton's brother, farmer, cheese maker (season 5-6)

==== Poor Ivanovs ====
- Semyon Treskunov as Danila (biological son of Anton and Polina Ivanov, son of Alexei and Lydia Ivanov; schoolboy (up to ep. 41) / student (since ep. 42))
- Mikhail Trukhin as Alexey (Lidia's husband, unemployed)
- Anna Ukolova as Lidia (Alexey's wife, seamstress)
- Yury Itskov as Viktor (Alexey's father, grandpa of Danila and Ivan, pensioner)

=== Supporting ===
- Elena Muravyeva as Ekaterina (the maid in the house of the rich Ivanovs (up to ep. 23), since ep. 30 — a maid in the house of Oganyan)
- Hrant Tokhatyan as Hamlet Oganyan (Armenian, neighbour of rich Ivanovs, a friend of Anton; Milana's husband, businessman)
- Viktoria Maslova as Milana Oganyan (Hamlet's wife)
- Vasilina Yuskovets as Ariel Oganyan (daughter of Hamlet and Milana; from ep. 20 to ep. 29 — Ivan's girlfriend, since ep. 41 — Danila's girlfriend)
- Kristina Kashirina as Yana (from ep. 20 to ep. 37 — Danila's girlfriend, since ep. 49 — Ivan's girlfriend)
- Sergey Belyaev as Albert Klimov (Yana's father, widower, businessman)
- Yulia Zimina as Alice
- Svetlana Kolpakova as Nina Milovanova (then — Ivanova) (Boris Ivanov's neighbor, in season 6 — his wife)
- Julia Sorokina as Vasilisa Milovanova (Nina's daughter, Ivan's girlfriend from episode 112)

== Trivia ==
- This is an original Russian television series. The authors of the idea are Vitaly Shlyappo, Alexey Mihnovich and Alexey Tatarenko.
- Filming of the series began in April 2017. Most of the filming takes place in the Moscow Oblast and directly Moscow. Some species were shot in Voronezh (Admiralty square).
- The television series received positive reviews from critics: "The secret and success of the show — the cast, phenomenally precisely entered in a dream the images".
- On December 30, 2023, the premiere of the full-length film "The Ivanovs vs. The Ivanovs. New Year's holidays" ("Ивановы-Ивановы. Новогодние каникулы").

== Awards ==
- Anna Ukolova received the TEFI-2018 award in the nomination "Best actress of a television film / TV series" for the role of Lidia Ivanova.
- TEFI 2023 — in the nomination "Best Comedy Series"

== Adaptations of the TV series in other countries of the world ==
- In June 2019, the Ukrainian TV channel "1+1" began filming an adaptation of the Russian sitcom "The Ivanovs vs. The Ivanovs". The Ukrainian version of the series was named «СидОренки-СидорЕнки».
- In 2021, an adaptation "The Kowalski vs. The Kowalski" was released in Poland, on the TV channel Polsat.
- In 2022, "Which Papadopoulos?" (Ποιός Παπαδόπουλος;) aired on ANT1, in Greece.
