= The Telki =

- Genre: Drama
- Based on: The Telki. A Story of Unreal Love by Sergey Minaev
- Written by: Dmitry Abezyayev; Marusya Trubnikova; Victoria Ostrovskaya
- Directed by: Maria Agranovich
- Starring: Miloš Biković; Lyubov Aksyonova; Oksana Akinshina; Paulina Andreeva; Aleksey Kravchenko; Victoria Tolstoganova
- Music by: Vadim Maevsky; Alexander Turkunov
- Country of origin: Russia
- Original language: Russian
- No. of seasons: 1
- No. of episodes: 8

Production
- Executive producers: Danila Sharapov; Pyotr Anurov; Vyacheslav Murugov
- Producers: Zhora Kryzhovnikov; Sergey Minaev; Fyodor Bondarchuk
- Cinematography: Dmitry Karnachik
- Running time: 41 minutes
- Production company: Mediaslovo

Original release
- Network: more.tv Wink; STS
- Release: February 24 – April 14, 2022

The Telki (Russian: The Тёлки) is a Russian dramatic television miniseries that premiered in 2022. It was directed by Maria Agranovich and is based on the novel The Telki. A Story of Unreal Love by Sergey Minaev.

The series stars Miloš Biković, Lyubov Aksyonova, Oksana Akinshina, and Paulina Andreeva in the lead roles.

== Plot ==
The series is based on Sergey Minaev’s novel The Tёлки. A Story of Unreal Love, with the story updated to the present day.

The protagonist, Andrey Mirkin, is the head of a successful PR agency whose comfortable life begins to collapse after an intimate video featuring him is leaked online.

== Episodes ==
No.	Description	Original air date
1	To become part of Moscow’s elite, PR agency head Andrey Mirkin is used to seducing, deceiving, and exploiting women. Destroying others’ lives has always helped him get what he wants—until someone decides to destroy his.	February 24, 2022
2	Police begin investigating Varya’s disappearance, while the loss of a major tender forces Mirkin to urgently look for money.	March 3, 2022
3	Mirkin is detained, and only a new acquaintance can help him. Lena tries to cope with infidelity, while Zhenya, after receiving money, stops answering calls.	March 10, 2022
4	Andrey discovers that he no longer exists: his social media profiles are deleted, his phone is blocked, and everything happening to him begins to feel like part of a carefully orchestrated plan.	March 17, 2022
5	Varya returns to Moscow, making the situation even more confusing—not only for Mirkin, but also for the investigators.	March 24, 2022
6	A new tragedy shocks everyone involved in Andrey’s story. Rita takes a radical step in her struggle against Tayozhny, while Varya’s romance seems too perfect to be real.	March 31, 2022
7	Mirkin and Tayozhny team up in an attempt to turn the situation around. Details of the conspiracy against the PR executive begin to emerge.	April 7, 2022
8	Mirkin learns who was behind everything that happened to him. He comes close to returning to his former life, but it remains unclear whether he can remain the same person.	April 14, 2022

== Cast ==
- Miloš Biković as Andrey Mirkin
- Lyubov Aksyonova as Vika, Andrey’s partner and friend
- Oksana Akinshina as Lena, Andrey’s wife
- Paulina Andreeva as Olga, a lawyer
- Victoria Tolstoganova as Zhenya, chair of a bank’s credit committee
- Aleksey Agranovich as Yuri Petrovich Tayozhny, chairman of a major corporation
- Aleksey Kravchenko as Boris Borisovich, Lena’s father
- Anna Slyu as Rita, Tayozhny’s wife
- Isabel Eydlen as Varya, Rita’s sister
- Maksim Stoyanov as Gubin
- Vlad Sokolovsky as Denis, Lena’s brother

== Production and reception ==
Filming began in Moscow in September 2021. The series was produced by Mediaslovo for NMG Studio.

The screenplay was written by Dmitry Abezyayev and Marusya Trubnikova, with Maria Agranovich serving as director.

The series premiered on February 24, 2022, on the streaming platforms more.tv and Wink. On May 2, 2022, it aired on the STS television channel.

Critics were divided. Film.ru reviewer Gulnaz Davletshina praised the cast but criticized the focus on an unlikeable protagonist at the expense of more compelling female characters.

Sergey Efimov of Komsomolskaya Pravda noted that the series avoided the overt journalistic tone of the novel but described its themes as outdated and its setting as artificial.

Audience reactions were mixed, with praise for the detective storyline and ensemble cast, alongside criticism that the story felt dated.
