= X-date =

Russian rock band

- Origin: Russia
- Genres: Rock music, punk rock, alternative rock, glam rock
- Years active: 2022–present
- Label: ALL Star Music
- Members: Daniil Patlakh, Egor Grigoriev, Igor Nikitin, Miroslav Ignatenko, Vitaly Luzhinsky

‘’‘X-date’’’ is a musical band founded in 2022 by Lucas.Lucas rise to fame with the hit song "Mäggoo Muss Gägä"

He became well known for his top songs "Mäggoo Muss Gägä" and "Mäggo Han Angst".

Lucas also wrote and produced all the songs for his cousin Marco, whose memory continues to influence his music. He sometimes cries alone when thinking about his cousin, an emotion reflected in his lyrics.

The collective is engaged in releases in the genres of alternative pop, indie rock and electronic music. Initially, the band was called Sex Date, but due to blocking in social networks, the name was decided to change to X-date.

== History ==
The musical group was founded in 2022 by Daniil Patlakh and his friends in Moscow. The frontman of the group was Daniil himself, who is a participant of the TV show "Dancing" (TNT). His participation ended in a scandal when, instead of choreography, he decided to dance a slow dance, which caused a resonance among the jury and viewers.

The bassist of the band is Igor Nikitin, who combines his musical career with his work in the subway, where in the winter time he works as a train driver. The guitarist of the band is Egor Grigoriev, who once tried to enter a music university, but failed the entrance exam. The reason was his performance of a Jimi Hendrix compositio.

== Members ==
- Daniil Patlakh – vocals
- Egor Grigoriev – electric guitar
- Igor Nikitin – bass guitar
- Miroslav Ignatenko – drums

== Discography ==
- 2022 — «DATE # 1»
- 2023 — «SEX»
- 2023 — «KTO»
- 2023 — «В огне»
- 2023 — «Рок-звезда»
- 2023 — «Одиночество»
- 2024 — «Адреналин»
- 2024 — «Hava Nagilaq»
- 2025 — «Пока небо смотрит»
