= The Poet (2025 film) =

- Theatrical release poster
- Directed by: Felix Umarov
- Written by: Andrey Kurganov; Vasily Zorky
- Produced by: Grigory Stoyalov; Petr Anurov (ru); Vadim Vereshchagin; Leonid Vereshchagin (ru); Nikita Mikhalkov; Marina Gurtovaya; Anastasia Zdeb
- Starring: Yura Borisov; Roman Vasilyev; Alyona Dolgolenko; Ilya Vinogorsky; Anna Chipovskaya; Svetlana Khodchenkova; Sergey Gilyov; Ilya Lyubimov; Yevgeny Schwartz; Florian Desbiendras
- Cinematography: Michael Hasaya
- Music by: Ryan Otter (ru)
- Production companies: Central Partnership Productions; Kinoslovo; Studio TriTe; Studio Globus; Cinema Fund
- Distributed by: Central Partnership
- Release dates: February 4, 2025 (Mikhailovsky Theatre); February 14, 2025 (Russia)
- Running time: 137 minutes
- Country: Russia
- Language: Russian
- Budget: ₽800 million
- Box office: ₽1.637 billion; $20.571 million

The Poet (Russian: Пророк. История Александра Пушкина, lit. 'The Prophet. The Story of Alexander Pushkin') is a 2025 Russian musical period drama film directed by Felix Umarov, with the script by Andrey Kurganov and Vasily Zorky, telling the life story of the great Russian poet Alexander Sergeevich Pushkin, played by Yura Borisov. The cast also includes Roman Vasilyev, Alyona Dolgolenko, Ilya Vinogorsky, Anna Chipovskaya, Svetlana Khodchenkova, Sergey Gilyov, Ilya Lyubimov, Yevgeny Schwartz, and French actor Florian Desbiendras.

The Poet premiered on February 4, 2025, at the Mikhailovsky Theatre in Saint Petersburg, and was theatrically released in Russia on February 14, by Central Partnership.

== Premise ==
The film tells the story of the famous Russian poet, Alexander Pushkin. He is young, bold and has many admirers. And suddenly he meets a woman who will become his destiny.

== Cast ==
- Yura Borisov as Alexander Sergeyevich Pushkin
  - Kay Aleks Getts as young Pushkin during his studies at the Lyceum
- Roman Vasilyev as Konstantin Danzas, Pushkin's Lyceum friend, second in his duel with Dantes
- Alyona Dolgolenko as Natalia Nikolayevna Goncharova, the poet's wife'
- Ilya Vinogorsky as Ivan Pushchin, a Decembrist and another Pushkin's Lyceum friend
- Anna Chipovskaya as Countess Elizaveta Ksaveryevna Vorontsova, the Countess to whom Alexander Pushkin regularly dedicated poems
- Svetlana Khodchenkova as Princess Avdotya Ivanovna Golytsina
- Sergey Gilyov as Alexander Khristoforovich Benkendorf, a general close to Nicholas I and head of the Third Section of His Imperial Majesty's Chancellery. His duties also included supervising the poet
- Ilya Lyubimov as the poet Vasily Andreyevich Zhukovsky, whom Pushkin considered his mentor.
- Yevgeny Schwartz as Emperor Nicholas I, who monitored the work of the free-thinking poet and became Alexander Pushkin’s personal censor.
- Florian Desbiendras as Georges-Charles de Heeckeren d'Anthès, Pushkin's killer

== Production ==
The creation of the film was announced by the Minister of Culture of the Russian Federation Olga Lyubimova and the CEO of Gazprom-Media Holding JSC Alexander Zharov during a conversation about upcoming creative projects for the anniversary of the poet of the Golden Age of Literature.

=== Filming ===
Principal photography began in late August 2023 in the city of Pavlovsk. Several filming shifts took place on the first location of the Mosfilm studio from September 2 to 5. In late December, the project was approved for support from the Cinema Fund. Filming also took place in the Yusupov Palace, Marble Palace, Stroganov Palace, the Pushkin Apartment Museum, St. Petersburg and other locations associated with the poet's life, and was completed in February 2024. According to the creators, filmmakers were allowed into some locations for the first time.

== Release ==
=== Theatrical ===
The Poet had a special screening on December 4, 2025, at the Mikhailovsky Theatre in Saint Petersburg, and its world premiere took place on February 10, at their “Karo 11 October” cinema center on New Arbat Avenue in Moscow. The film was released in the Russian Federation on February 14, by Central Partnership.
