= Viktoriya Isakova =

Russian actress (born 1976)

- Виктория Исакова
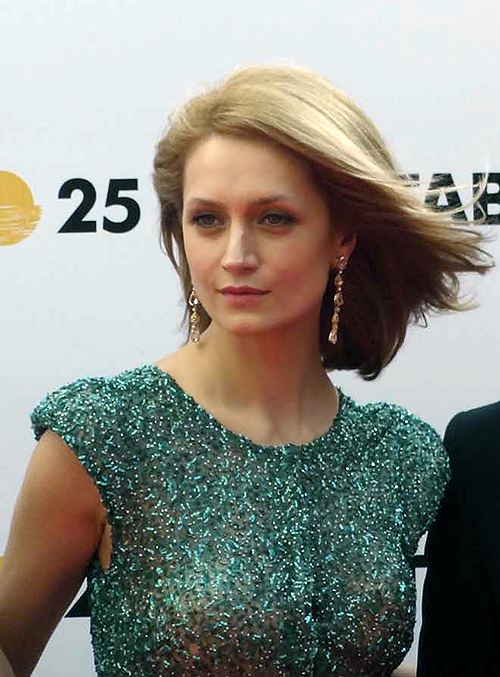
- Isakova at the opening ceremony of the festival "Kinotavr 2014" in Sochi.
- Born: Viktoriya Evgenievna Isakova; 12 October 1976 (age 49); Khasavyurt, RSFSR, USSR (now Dagestan, Russia)
- Occupation: Actress
- Years active: 1998—present
- Spouse: Yuri Moroz (2003–Died 2025)
- Awards: Government awards of the Russian Federation

Viktoriya Evgenievna Isakova (Russian: Викто́рия Евге́ньевна Иса́кова; born 12 October 1976) is a Russian theater and film actress. Her film credits include Tochka (2006), The Island (2006) and Mirrors (2013). Her television credits include Ottepel (2013). In 2015 she starred in Rodina, the Russian TV adaptation of Homeland.

== Biography ==
Isakova was born in Khasavyurt, Dagestan ASSR, RSFSR, USSR. She was the youngest of three children in the family. Her father is a Mountain Jew, and her mother is Russian. At age 13 she moved with her family to Moscow. After school she entered the Russian Academy of Theatre Arts, and after years of study transferred to the Moscow Art Theatre School in the course of Oleg Efremov. She graduated from the Moscow Art Theatre School in 1999.

In 2001, she joined the Moscow Pushkin Drama Theatre. For her performance of Pannochka in the play Viy, she won the 2003 "Seagull" Theatre Award.

Her husband was the director Yuri Moroz.

In 2006, for the role of Kira, nicknamed "Zebra", in Yuri Moroz's Tochka, Viktoriya Isakova received the award for "Best Actress of the Year" at the Chicago International Film Festival.

== Filmography ==
| Year | Title | Role | Notes |
|---|---|---|---|
| 2000 | Empire under Attack | Episode | TV series |
| 2004 | Women in a game without rules | Tonya | TV Series |
| 2006 | Nanny Wanted | Vera | |
| 2006 | Piranha | Sinilga | |
| 2006 | Doctor Zhivago | Marinka | (11 series) |
| 2006 | Tochka | Kira | |
| 2006 | The Island | Nastya | |
| 2006 | Filipp's Bay | Oia | TV series |
| 2007 | The branch of lilac | Anna Ladyzhenskaya | |
| 2008 | Mediator | Lilia | |
| 2008 | Button | Elizabeta Tenetskaya | TV Movie |
| 2008 | Big Foot | Dasha Shelestova, journalist | TV Movie |
| 2009 | Prodigal children | Galina Morozova | TV Series |
| 2009 | The Brothers Karamazov | Katerina Ivanovna | TV Series |
| 2009 | Pelagia and the White Bulldog | Naina Tatishcheva | TV Series |
| 2010 | Rat | Anna Shcherbakova | TV Movie |
| 2010 | Tower | Eva | TV Series |
| 2010 | Smile, Cry When Stars | Anna Svetlova | TV Movie |
| 2013 | Pyotr Leschenko. Everything That Was... | Yekaterina Zavyalova | TV Series |
| 2013 | Mirrors | Marina Tsvetaeva | |
| 2013 | The Thaw | Inga Khrustaleva | TV Series |
| 2013 | Kill twice | Mariya Danilova | TV Series |
| 2014 | Inquisitor | Natalya Serebryanskaya, private detective | TV Series |
| 2015 | Rodina | Anna Zimina | TV series |
| 2015 | Green Сarriage | Vera Raevskaya | |
| 2016 | Damned Цretch | Diana | TV series |
| 2016 | The Student | Elena Krasnova | |
| 2017 | Mata Hari | Lidia Kireevskaya | TV series |
| 2017 | The Optimists | Katrin Muratoff | TV series |
| 2017 | You All Infuriate Me | Diana | TV series |
| 2020 | To the Lake | Anna | TV series |
| 2020 | One Breath | Marina Gordeeva | |
| 2020 | Man from Podolsk | Marina | |
| 2020 | Has Anyone Seen My Girl? | Kira | |
| 2020 | Troe | Zlata | |
| 2021 | Vertinsky | Marlene Dietrich | |
| 2022 | 13 Clinical | Irina Lvovna | TV series |
| 2024 | Guest from the Future | Kira Selezneva | |
