= List of Russian films of 2014 =

The Russian film industry produced over one hundred feature films in 2014. This article fully lists all non-pornographic films, including short films, that had a release date in that year, and which were at least partly made by Russia. It does not include films first released in previous years that had release dates in 2014.
Also included is an overview of the major events in Russian film, including film festivals and awards ceremonies, as well as lists of those films that have been particularly well received, both critically and financially.

== Major releases ==
Opening		Title	Cast and Crew	Studio	Genre(s)	Ref.
J A N U A R Y	15	Jack Ryan: Shadow Recruit	Director: Kenneth Branagh; Cast: Chris Pine, Kevin Costner, Kenneth Branagh, Keira Knightley	Paramount Pictures	Action; Thriller	
J A N U A R Y	30	Viy; Вий	Director: Oleg Stepchenko; Cast: Aleksey Chadov, Valery Zolotukhin, Anna Churina, Charles Dance, Agniya Ditkovskite, Jason Flemyng	NBC Universal Russia	Fantasy	
F E B R U A R Y	27	Spiral; Спираль	Director: Andrey Volgin; Cast: Anatoliy Rudenko, Konstantin Kryukov, Klarissa Barskaya, Venyamin Smekhov		Action	
M A R C H	3	Love in Vegas (Love in the Big City 3)	Director: Maryus Vaysberg; Cast: Aleksey Chadov, Vera Brezhneva, Alexander Petrov		Romantic comedy	
M A R C H	6	Dubrovskiy; Дубровский	Director: Kirill Mikhanovsky, Aleksandr Vartanov; Cast: Danila Kozlovsky, Klavdiya Korshunova, Yuriy Tsurilo		Drama	
A P R I L	3	Chagall — Malevich; Шагал — Малевич	Director: Alexander Mitta; Cast: Leonid Bichevin		Drama	
A P R I L	10	The Adventurers; Авантюристы	Director: Konstantin Buslov; Cast: Konstantin Khabensky, Svetlana Khodchenkova, Denis Shvedov		Adventure	
M A Y	1	The Kitchen in Paris; Кухня в Париже	Director: Dmitry Dyachenko; Cast: Dmitriy Nazarov, Mark Bogatyryov, Yelena Podkaminskaya, Dmitry Nagiyev, Vincent Perez	Yellow, Black and White-Group	Comedy, Feature	
M A Y	8	22 Minutes; 22 минуты	Director: Vasily Serikov; Cast: Makar Zaporozhskiy, Denis Nikiforov, Gaël Kamilindi, Viktor Sukhorukov, Aleksandr Galibin	Central Partnership	Action	
M A Y	23	Leviathan; Левиафан	Director: Andrey Zvyagintsev; Cast: Aleksei Serebryakov, Elena Lyadova, Vladimir Vdovichenkov, Roman Madyanov		Drama	
J U N E	5	All at Once; Всё и сразу	Director: Roman Karimov; Cast: Nikita Ost, Anton Shurtsov, Aleksandr Pal, Yulia Khlynina, Artyom Kostyunev		Comedy	
J U N E	6	The Fool; Дурак	Director: Yuri Bykov; Cast: Artyom Bystrov, Boris Nevzorov		Drama	
J U N E	11	Fort Ross: In Search of Adventure; Форт Росс: В поисках приключений	Director: Yuri Moroz; Cast: Maksim Matveev, Anna Starshenbaum, Maksim Vinogradov, Kirill Pletnyov, Alexander Petrov, Laia Costa, Andrey Merzlikin	DreamTeam Media	Action, Adventure, Fantasy	
J U N E	12	I Won't Come Back; Я не вернусь	Director: Ilmar Raag; Cast: Polina Pushkaruk	CTB Film Company	Drama	
J U L Y	9	Corrections Class; Класс коррекции	Director: Ivan Tverdovskiy; Cast: Mariya Poezzhaeva, Filipp Avdeyev		Drama	
J U L Y	10	Iron Ivan; Поддубный	Director: Gleb Orlov; Cast: Mikhail Porechenkov		Drama	
A U G U S T	4	The Lesson	Director: Andris Gauja; Cast: Inga Alsiņa, Mārcis Klatenbergs, Andrejs Smoļakovs, Gatis Gāga, Liena Šmukste, Marina Janaus, Edgars Siliņš, Ieva Apine, Elza Feldmane, Agirs Neminskis	Riverbed	Drama	
A U G U S T	31	The Cut	Director: Fatih Akın; Cast: Tahar Rahim		Drama	
S E P T E M B E R	1	Tsili	Director: Amos Gitai; Cast: Sarah Adler, Meshi Olinski, Lea Koenig, Adam Tsekhman, Andrey Kashkar	Epicentre Films	Drama	
S E P T E M B E R	2	Viktor	Director: Philippe Martinez; Cast: Gérard Depardieu, Elizabeth Hurley, Eli Danker, Polina Kuzminskaya, Alexei Petrenko, Marcello Mazzarella, Denis Karasyov	Inception Media Group	Action	
S E P T E M B E R	5	The Postman's White Nights; Белые ночи почтальона Алексея Тряпицына	Director: Andrei Konchalovsky; Cast: Aleksey Tryapitsyn		Drama	
O C T O B E R	3	Sunstroke; Солнечный удар	Director: Nikita Mikhalkov; Cast: Martinsh Kalita, Viktoriya Solovyova, Sergei Karpov, Anastasiya Imamova, Sergey Serov, Aleksandr Ustyugov, Miloš Biković	DreamTeam Media	Drama	
O C T O B E R	9	The Film About Alekseyev; Кино про Алексеева	Director: Mikhail Segal; Cast: Aleksandr Zbruyev		Drama	
D E C E M B E R	4	Love Does Not Love; Любит не любит	Director: Klim Shipenko; Cast: Maksim Matveev, Lyubov Aksyonova, Svetlana Khodchenkova, Yekaterina Vasilyeva, Sergey Gazarov, Aleksandr Ratnikov, Yuri Kolokolnikov	Yellow, Black and White-Group	Romantic comedy	
D E C E M B E R	4	Vasilisa; Василиса	Director: Anton Sivers; Cast: Svetlana Khodchenkova, Jérôme Cusin, Andrey Ilin	Russian World Studios	Historical	
D E C E M B E R	4	Star; Звезда	Director: Anna Melikian; Cast: Tinatin Dalakishvili		Drama	
D E C E M B E R	5	Black Sea	Director: Kevin Macdonald; Cast: Jude Law, Scoot McNairy, Ben Mendelsohn, David Threlfall, Konstantin Khabensky	Focus Features	Adventure; Thriller; Historical	
D E C E M B E R	18	The Calculator; Вычислитель	Director: Dmitriy Grachev; Cast: Yevgeny Mironov, Anna Chipovskaya, Vinnie Jones, Aleksey Kolubkov	Art Pictures Studio	Science-fiction	
D E C E M B E R	25	Yolki 1914; Ёлки 1914	Director: Timur Bekmambetov, Dmitry Kiselyov, Alexander Kott, Yuri Bykov, Aleksander Karpilovsky, Ekaterina Telegina, Andrey Kavun, Zaour Zaseev; Cast: Ivan Urgant, Sergei Svetlakov, Artur Smolyaninov	Bazelevs	Comedy	

== See also ==
- 2014 in film
- 2014 in Russia
- Cinema of Russia
- List of Russian submissions for the Academy Award for Best Foreign Language Film
