= List of Russian films of 2008 =

A list of films produced in Russia in 2008 (see 2008 in film).

== 2008 ==
Title	Russian title	Director	Cast	Genre	Notes
Admiral	Адмиралъ	Andrei Kravchuk	Konstantin Khabensky, Elizaveta Boyarskaya, Sergey Bezrukov	Historical drama	About Alexander Kolchak
Alexander	Александр. Невская битва	Igor Kalyonov	Anton Pampushnyy	Historical, action	About Alexander Nevsky
At Sea	На море	Jaroslav Chevazhevsky		Comedy	
The Best Movie	Самый лучший фильм	Kirill Kuzin	Garic Kharlamov, Mikhail Galustyan, Pavel Volya	Comedy	
Black Hunters	Мы из бу́дущего	Andrey Malyukov	Danila Kozlovsky, Andrey Terentev	Science-fiction	
Captive	Пленный	Alexei Uchitel	Vyacheslav Krikunov	Drama	
Don't Think About White Monkeys	Не думай про белых обезьян	Yuri Mamin	Mikhail Tarabukin	Comedy	
Everybody Will Die, And I Shall Remain	Все умрут, а я останусь	Valeriya Gai Germanika	Agniya Kuznetsova, Polina Filonenko	Drama	
The Ghost	Домовой	Karen Oganesyan	Konstantin Khabensky, Vladimir Mashkov, Chulpan Khamatova	Thriller	
The Heirs	Наследники	Konstantin Odegov	Aleksandr Bashirov, Yuliya Galkina	Drama	
Hipsters	Стиляги	Valery Todorovsky	Anton Shagin, Oksana Akinshina, Evgeniya Khirivskaya	Musical comedy	
God's Smile or The Odessa Story	Улыбка Бога, или Чисто одесская история	Vladimir Alenikov	Armen Dzhigarkhanyan	Comedy	
The Inhabited Island	Обитаемый остров	Fyodor Bondarchuk	Vasiliy Stepanov, Yuliya Snigir, Pyotr Fyodorov	Science fiction	Based on Prisoners of Power by Strugatskies
Live and Remember	Живи и помни	Aleksandr Proshkin	Darya Ekamasova, Mikhail Evlanov	Drama	
Man of East	Непобедимый	Oleg Pogodin	Vladimir Epifantsev	Action	
Morphine	Морфий	Aleksei Balabanov	Leonid Bichevin, Ingeborga Dapkūnaitė, Andrei Panin	Drama	
The New Year's Rate Plan	Тариф «Новогодний»	Evgeny Bedarev	Valeriya Lanskaya, Daniil Strakhov	Comedy	
Nirvana	Нирвана	Igor Voloshin	Olga Sutulova, Mariya Shalayeva, Artur Smolyaninov	Drama	
Paper Soldier	Бумажный солдат	Aleksey German	Merab Ninidze, Chulpan Khamatova	Drama	Set in 1961.
Philosophy of a Knife	Философия ножа	Andrey Iskanov	Yukari Fujimoto, Yumiko Fujiwara	Horror, Documentary	
Plato	Платон	Vartan Akopyan	Pavel Volya	Drama	
Hitler goes Kaput!	Гитлер капут!	Marius Waisberg	Pavel Derevyanko, Anna Semenovich	Comedy	
Once Upon a Time in the Provinces	Однажды в провинции	Katya Shagalova	Leonid Bichevin, Elvira Bolgova, Yuliya Peresild	Drama	Entered into the 30th Moscow International Film Festival
Plus One	Плюс один	Oksana Bychkova	Madeleine Dzhabrailova, Jethro Skinner	Drama	
Practical Joke	Розыгрыш	Andrei Kudinenko	Evgeny Dmitriev	Drama	
Radio Day	День радио	Dmitriy Dyachenko	Leonid Barats	Comedy	
S. S. D.	С. С. Д.	Vadim Shmelyov	Anfisa Chekhova	Horror	
Street Racers	Стритрейсеры	Oleg Fesenko	Aleksey Chadov	Action	
Terra Nova	Новая Земля	Aleksandr Melnik	Konstantin Lavronenko	Action	
Vanished Empire	Исчезнувшая империя	Karen Shakhnazarov	Armen Dzhigarkhanyan, Alexander Lyapin	Drama	Set in 1973.
Wild Field	Дикое поле	Mikheil Kalatozishvili	Oleg Dolin, Roman Madyanov, Yuriy Stepanov	Drama	
Yuri's Day	Юрьев день	Kirill Serebrennikov	Kseniya Rappoport	Drama	

== See also ==
- 2008 in Russia
