= Black Square (1992 film) =

- Чёрный квадрат (Russian)
- Directed by: Yuri Moroz
- Written by: Yuri Moroz; Friedrich Neznansky
- Produced by: Sergey Zhigunov
- Starring: Dmitry Kharatyan; Vitali Solomin; Elena Yakovleva; Vasily Lanovoy; Tatyana Kravchenko
- Cinematography: Boris Novoselov
- Edited by: Valentina Mironova
- Music by: Yuri Poteyenko
- Production company: Gorky Film Studio
- Release date: 1992
- Running time: 123 min.
- Country: Russia
- Language: Russian

Black Square (Note: Russian: Чёрный квадрат, romanized: Čjornyj kvadrat, IPA: [ˈtɕɵrnɨj kvɐˈdrat]) is a 1992 Russian crime film directed by Yuri Moroz. The film tells about operatives who, at the risk of their lives, are investigating a murder in which the highest echelons of the military leadership of Russia are involved.

== Plot ==
The film opens with an epigraph quoting the song “Wolf Hunt” by Vladimir Vysotsky and a French rendition of his song "La Fin Du Bal" from the 1977 album La Corde Raide. Set in Moscow during November and December 1982, shortly after the death of Brezhnev, the story follows Alexander Turetsky, a young trainee investigator at the Moscow Prosecutor’s Office, and his mentor, Merkulov, as they probe a complex murder case.

The investigation begins when Rakitin, a high-ranking official in the Soviet foreign trade department, is found hanged near the VDNH exhibition center. On the same day, his lover, Bolshoi Ballet dancer Valeria Kupriyanova, is discovered murdered in a hotel room registered under Rakitin's name. As Turetsky and Merkulov dig deeper, they uncover a criminal network dealing in contraband jewels and find that stolen valuables are hidden in the homes of top-ranking officials. Under Yuri Andropov’s rule, there is now a push for law and order, leading to the arrest of prominent figure Mikhail Georgadze, Secretary of the Presidium of the Supreme Soviet, who later dies in custody.

Meanwhile, Turetsky embarks on a secret affair with forensic expert Rita Schastlivaya. As the investigation proceeds, they realize state security agents are surveilling and intercepting them. They uncover that Rakitin had stumbled upon sensitive KGB plans to destabilize the global economy, which he intended to leak to a foreign journalist. General Kassarine, a KGB officer trafficking gold and gems to finance covert operations abroad, becomes determined to suppress the investigation. After an unsuccessful attempt to recruit Turetsky, Kassarine resorts to violence, leading to the death of Rita and injury to Merkulov. A final confrontation ends with Kassarine’s death in a shootout. Turetsky burns the compromising documents and, in the film’s closing scenes, visits the recovering Merkulov in the hospital, revealing that he will continue working at the prosecutor's office.

== Cast ==
- Dmitry Kharatyan as Alexander Borisovich Turetsky, investigator
- Vitali Solomin as Konstantin Dmitrievich Merkulov, investigator
- Elena Yakovleva as Rita Schastlivaya, forensic expert
- Vasily Lanovoy as Kassarin, KGB General
- Tatyana Kravchenko as Alexandra Rusanova
- Armen Dzhigarkhanyan as Mikhail Georgadze, Secretary of the Presidium of the Supreme Soviet of the USSR
- Emmanuil Vitorgan as Kazakov
- Alla Balter as Rakitina
- Darya Moroz as Lida Merkulova
- Vladimir Talashko as Gryaznov
- Vadim Andreyev as Krasnikovsky
- Andrei Boltnev as Ponomarev
- Mikhail Gluzsky as Tsapko, GRU general
- Igor Yasulovich as Rakitin

== Reception ==
Author of Kommersant, Andrei Viktorov, noted: “Lovers of political puzzles will find a lot of interesting things in the film - the former and current powers of this world play an important role in the development of the intricate plot. Viewers who follow the director's discoveries and precise editing will be able to appreciate the direction of the film. The film will also please fans of “Znatoki”, since “Black Square” is nothing more than an improved version of the famous television series: everything seems to be very reminiscent of the well-known film, but the surroundings are richer, and the characters are more significant.”

== Literature ==
- Sergei Dobrotvorsky, Lyubov Arkus. Recent history of Russian cinema: Cinema and context: vol. 4. 1986-1988. — Seans, 2001. — P. 291. — 523 p. — ISBN 9785901586020.
