= Anatoliy Beliy =

Ukrainian-Israeli actor

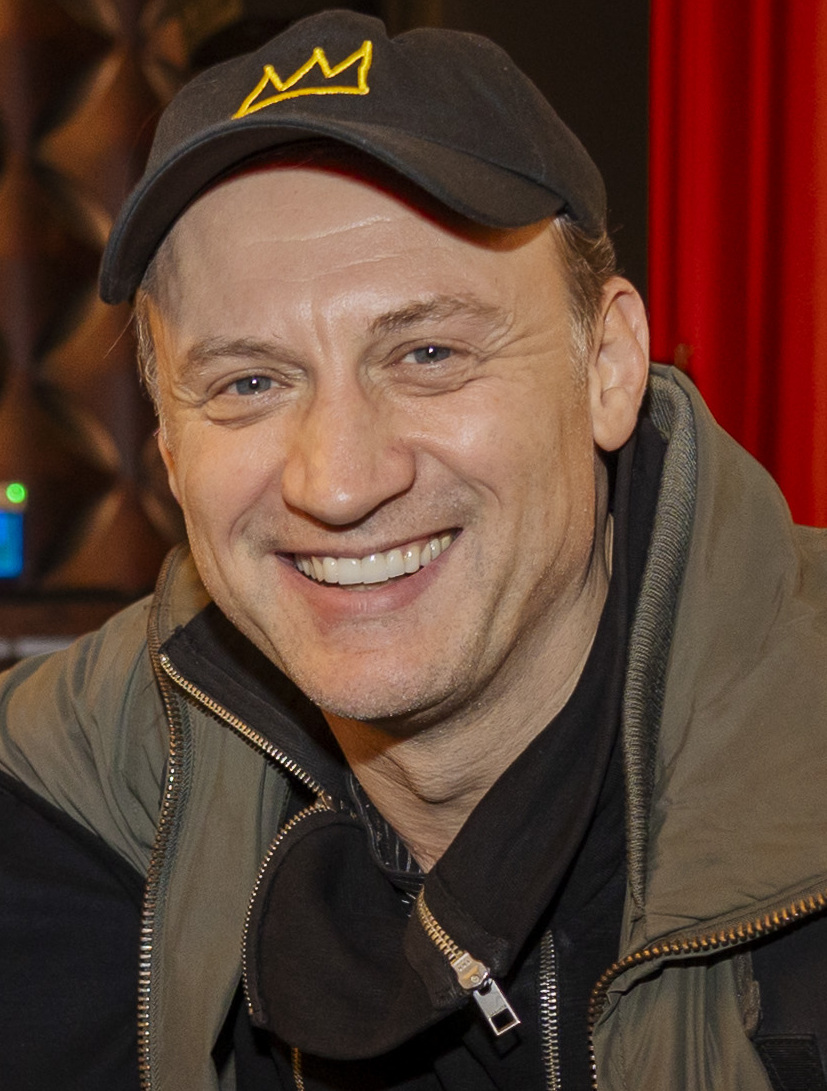
- Beliy in 2024
- Born: Anatoly Alexandrovich Weißmann; 1 August 1972 (age 54); Bratslav, USSR
- Education: Mikhail Shchepkin Higher Theatre School
- Occupation: Actor
- Years active: 1983–present

Anatoly Alexandrovich Weißmann, known professionally as Anatoly Alexandrovich Beliy (Russian: Анатолий Александрович Белый; born 1 August 1972) is a Russian and Israeli actor. He was awarded the Merited Artist of the Russian Federation in 2006.

== Biography ==
Anatoliy Beliy was born in Bratslav in 1972 and grew up in Tolyatti, where his parents worked on the construction of the Volga Automobile Plant. His mother later became a German teacher at a school.

=== Education and early acting experience ===
After graduating from school in 1989, he entered the Kuibyshev Aviation Institute to study electronic computers, systems, complexes, and networks as an on-board equipment software engineer. However, he soon discovered his lack of interest in a technical career and in his third year, he decided to leave college. Alongside his studies, he played guitar, participated in KVN, and performed in the national youth theater, where he realized his passion for acting. He later moved to Moscow, enrolling at the Mikhail Shchepkin Higher Theatre School under Nikolai Afonin, graduating in 1995. Beliy completed his military service at the Russian Army Theatre.

== Career ==
Since 1998, Anatoliy Beliy has been an actor at the Stanislavski and Nemirovich-Danchenko Theatre, and in 2003, he joined the Moscow Art Theater A.P. Chekhov. His portrayal of the Master in The Master and Margarita (directed by Hungarian director János Szász in 2011) was particularly praised. He received multiple Chaika Awards in 2002, 2003, and 2007, and in 2006, he was named an Honored Artist of the Russian Federation. On September 25, 2015, he launched the online theatrical readings series "Chekhov is Alive," bringing Chekhov's works to new audiences.

Early in his career, Beliy was often credited by his original surname, "Weisman", which he later changed to the Russian translation, "Beliy". Initially, he appeared in minor roles and worked as a stuntman. He began gaining recognition in the 2002 TV series Brigada and the supernatural drama Eyes of Olga Korzh (2002), with subsequent parts in series like Multiplying Sorrow (2005).

Beliy's career gained further momentum with The Seventh Day (2006) and the melodrama Talisman of Love (2005), co-starring with Tatyana Arntgolts and Svetlana Khodchenkova. His role in the 2007 thriller Paragraph 78 became a major hit, and in 2008, he portrayed Ivan Karamazov in The Brothers Karamazov. Other notable projects from this period include Crimson Snowfall (2009), blockbuster comedy What Men Still Talk About (2011), thriller Steel Butterfly (2012), and disaster movie Metro (2013).

In 2014, Beliy portrayed artist Kazimir Malevich in the biographical drama Chagall — Malevich, followed by his role as Grigory Alexandrov in the series Orlova and Alexandrov (2015). In 2016, he launched Kinopoetry, a project of short films inspired by poetry, collaborating with renowned actors such as Sergey Bezrukov, Artur Smolyaninov, and Maria Mironova to bring poetry to younger audiences.

Other notable projects include the film Moth (2016), various TV series including Garden Ring (2018), Vorona (2018) alongside Elizaveta Boyarskaya, and Switched (2019).

=== 2021–present ===
In 2021, Beliy starred in the apocalyptic drama Quarantine by Diana Ringo, followed by a role in the 2022 sci-fi film Mira directed by Dmitry Kiselyov. He also appeared in the Russian spinoff of Dancing with the Stars with dance partner Inna Svechnikova. In 2022, following the Russian invasion of Ukraine, Beliy publicly opposed the war, resigned from the Moscow Art Theatre, and relocated to Israel in July 2022. In September 2022, Beliy played the lead role in I Am Here, a dramatic performance created and directed by Egor Trukhin. The performance premiered in Israel and later toured internationally. Beliy joined the Gesher Theater, where he has appeared in the plays Crime and Punishment and Don't Look Back.

In 2024, Beliy narrated the Russian-language voiceover for the documentary film Auschwitz, produced by Steven Spielberg. Spielberg expressed his gratitude for Beliy's work, praising his talent and contribution to the film. In the same year, he appeared in the film Khalisa, for which he was nominated for the Ophir Award for Best Supporting Actor.

In 2025, the film Two Prosecutors, starring Anatoliy Beliy and directed by Sergei Loznitsa, was selected for the Official Selection in the main competition at the 78th Cannes Film Festival. In the same year, Anatoliy also starred in the Israeli TV series Motherland.

In 2026, the film Minotaur by Andrey Zvyagintsev starring Beliy, won the Grand Prix at the 79th Cannes Film Festival.

=== Theatrical works ===
- Romeo and Juliet Shakespeare a. Director: Robert Sturua, New Globe Production Center – Mercutio
- Mata Hari. Director: Olga Subbotina, Strelkov Theater together with the Theater A Parte – Andrey
- Cuckoo, P. Gladilin's entreprise
- Captive Spirits. Director: Vladimir Ageev – Andrey Bely
- Bummeroff. Director: Mikhail Ugarov – Stolz
- Moscow – an open city – mini-performance Set-2. Director: Olga Subbotina
- Candid Polaroid Pictures. Director: Kirill Serebrennikov – Victor
- A. is different. Director: Olga Subbotina – Gerd
- Transfer. Director: Mikhail Ugarov – Alexey
- The Days of the Turbins by M. A. Bulgakov. Dir. Sergey Zhenovach – Shervinsky
- King Lear. Director: Tadashi Suzuki – Lear
- Prima Donnas Director: Evgeny Pisarev – Pastor Duncan
- Pillow Man Martin McDonagh. Director: Kirill Serebrennikov – Katurian
- Playing the victim based on the play of the same name by The Presnyakov Brothers – several roles. Director: Kirill Serebrennikov
- The Seagull Anton Chekhov. Director: Oleg Efremov, 2001 version – dir. N. Skorik – Trigorin.
- Rosencrantz and Guildenstern Are Dead Tom Stoppard. Director: Pavel Safronov, Another Theater – Guildenstern .
- The Break by I. Goncharov – dir. Adolph Shapiro. Paradise
- The Duel by Anton Chekhov – dir. A. Yakovlev – Laevsky
- Terrorism – dir. Kirill Serebrennikov – several roles
- Woe from Wit – dir. Oleg Menshikov – Zagoretsky
- Twelfth Night, The Taming of the Shrew – dir. Vladimir Mirzoev – Sebastian, Lucentio
- The Master and Margarita based on the work of the same name Mikhail Bulgakov – dir. Janos Sas – Master
- Close to Zero – dir. Kirill Serebrennikov – Egor

=== Filmography ===
==== Actor's work ====
- 1996 - Kings of the Russian investigation
- 1999 - Mother - pimp
- 2001 - The Perfect Match
- 2001 - Ordinary days - Larik
- 2001 - Master of the Empire - Oleg
- 2002 - Brigada - Igor Vvedensky's assistant
- 2002 - The Killer's Diary - Ilya, Polina's former classmate
- 2003 - Savior under the Birches - businessman Bald
- 2003 - Taste of Murder
- 2003 - Mail Order Bride / Mail Order Bride (Italy-USA-RF) - Dancer
- 2003 - Thieves and prostitutes. Prize - space flight - Vasya Stalin's guard
- 2004 - Obsession - Investigator Sobol
- 2005 - Talisman of love - Alexander Uvarov
- 2005 - Multiplier sadness - Alexander Serebrovsky
- 2006 - Wolfhound - Vinitar
- 2006 - Film Festival - Pashka Zhuk
- 2006 - Tin - Alexander
- 2006 - Seventh day - Nikolai
- 2007 - Let's play - Dr. Apollon Karlovich
- 2007 - On the way to the heart - Alexey Kovalev, cardiac surgeon
- 2007 - I will never forget you! - Vladimir Volin
- 2007 - Paragraph 78 - Spam
- 2007 - Yarik - Boris
- 2008 - Lord Officers: Save the Emperor - Commissioner Bates
- 2008 - Zastava Zhilina - Tereykin, senior lieutenant, head of the outpost
- 2008 - Revenge: The Other Side of Love - Andrey Zhitkov
- 2008 - Nobody But Us - classmate of Evgeny Levashov
- 2008 - Pari - Igor
- 2008 - The most beautiful 2 - Andrey Sorin
- 2008 - North Wind - Vsevolod Grinko
- 2008 - Quiet Family Life - Gleb
- 2008 - Keep Me Rain - Evgeny Steklov
- 2008 - Echo From the Past - Viktor Zhukov
- 2009 - The Brothers Karamazov - Ivan Karamazov
- 2009 - One Family - Zhukov, director of the orphanage
- 2009 - Desire - Victor, architect
- 2009 - Following the Phoenix - Alexey
- 2009 - Soundtrack of Passion - Kosbutsky
- 2010 - Crimson Snowfall - Konstantin Gerstel, brother of Xenia
- 2010 - Turbulence Zone
- 2010 - In the Style of Jazz - actor
- 2010 - 43rd issue - Andrey Golota
- 2010 - Private investigation of retired colonel - Denis Konyshev
- 2010 - Who Am I? - investigator
- 2011 - Furtseva - Nikita Vsevolozhsky
- 2011 - What Men Still Talk About - Valera, FSB officer
- 2011 - Pandora - Andrey Vityaev
- 2011 - Rose Valley - Nuno
- 2012 - The Ballad of Uhlans - Kiknadze
- 2012 - August Eighth - Alexey, adviser to the president
- 2012 - Steel Butterfly - Grigory Khanin, police captain
- 2012 - Long-legged and beloved - Nikolai Erdman
- 2013 - Metro - Vlad Konstantinov
- 2013 - Vangelia - Alexey Neznamov, Soviet intelligence officer, hypnotist doctor
- 2013 - Marriage by testament 3. Dancing on coals - Ilya Kovalev
- 2013 - I will never forget you - Sergey, driver
- 2013 - Embracing the sky - Ivan Kotov (adult)
- 2013 - Marathon - Stanislav, water polo player
- 2013 - City Spies - Andrey Shpagin
- 2014 - Chagall — Malevich - Kazimir Malevich
- 2014 - Kuprin. Yama - husband of Vera
- 2015 - The Dawns here are Quiet ... - Comrade 'Third', Major
- 2015 - Orlova and Alexandrov - Grigori Aleksandrov
- 2015 - Bartender - regular bartender
- 2015 - The war of the sexes - Konstantin Evseevich
- 2015 - Snow and ash - Zinovy Borisovich Velyaminov, colonel
- 2015 - The heirs - German Borisovich Zvonarevsky, political scientist
- 2015 - Immediately get married - Nikolay
- 2015 - SOS, Santa Claus, or Everything will come true! - Nikolai Andreevich Orlov, director of Avtoradio
- 2016 - Pure Art - investigator
- 2016 - Close your eyes - Foki's dad
- 2016 - The Wall - King Sigismund III
- 2016 - Moth - Serge
- 2016 - I will love you, can I? - Vadim
- 2017 - Blast wave - Denis Brunov
- 2017 - Optimists - Black
- 2017 - Doctor Richter - Dr. Lev Viktorovich Zharkov
- 2017 - House of Porcelain - Valery Luzhin, General of the KGB
- 2017 - Confused - Boris Morozov
- 2017 - Garden Ring - Andrey
- 2017 - Portrait of the second wife - Yuri Ratnikov
- 2018 - Day till - Father of Mishka and Nastya
- 2018 - Vorona - Major Sergei Kabanov, investigator
- 2019 - Vocal-criminal ensemble - Arkady Semyonovich Zolotarevsky, singer
- 2019 - Call-center - Igor Markovich Zuev, FSB Lieutenant Colonel
- 2020 - Passengers - Igor
- 2021 - Master - Vasily Kuznetsov
- 2021 - Love - Maxim
- 2021 - Quarantine - Felix
- 2022 - Mira - Arabov
- 2024 - Halisa - Anatoliy
- 2025 - Two Prosecutors - Andrey Vyshinsky
- 2025 - Motherland - Andrei Chadov
- 2026 - Minotaur

==== Dubbing ====
- 2013 – Romeo and Juliet – Signor Capulet
- 2017 – Holiday Party – James (Gilles Lellouche)

==== Voiceover ====
- 2006 – Prince Vladimir – Yaropolk
- 2017 – Kamchatka bears. Beginning of Life (documentary) – voiceover

==== Television ====
- 2022 – Dancing with the Stars

== Awards and nominations ==
Year	Award	Category	Work	Result
2014	Golden Eagle Award	Best Leading Actor	Metro	Nominated
2024	Ophir Award	Best Supporting Actor	Halisa	Nominated

== Family ==
- First wife (1995–2006): Marina Golub – actress and TV presenter. No children.
- Second wife (since 2006): Inessa Moskvicheva – designer; she has a daughter from her first marriage – Ekaterina (born 1998). The marriage with Moskvicheva was registered on June 1, 2013.
  - Children from the second marriage: son – Maxim (born June 19, 2007), daughter – Victoria (born June 29, 2010).
