= Trukhin =

Trukhin, feminine: Trukhina is a Russian surname. Notable people with the surname include:

- Dmytro Trukhin, Ukrainian footballer
- Egor Trukhin, Russian-Israeli actor and director
- Fyodor Truhin (1896–1946), Russian Nazi collaborator
- Larisa Trukhina (born 1958), Russian singer
- Nataliya Trukhina, birth name of Nataliya Kuznetsova (born 1991), Russian bodybuilder
- Oleksandr Trukhin (born 1986), Ukrainian businessman and politician, M.P.
