= Yaroslav Boyko =

Russian actor of theater and cinema

- Born: Yaroslav Nikolaevich Boyko; 14 May 1970 (age 56); Kiev, Ukrainian SSR, Soviet Union
- Occupation: Actor
- Years active: 1991–present
- Spouse: Ramunė Chodorkaitė
- Website: yaroslavboiko.narod.ru

Yaroslav Nikolaevich Boyko (Russian: Яросла́в Никола́евич Бо́йко, Ukrainian: Яросла́в Микола́йович Бо́йко; born May 14, 1970,) is a Russian actor of theater and cinema.

== Selected filmography ==
- Heads and Tails (1995) as driver
- Country of the Deaf (1998) as bandit
- Kamenskaya (1999) as Vadim Andreevich Boytsov
- In August of 1944 (2001) as captain Anikushin
- Filipp's Bay (2006) as Oswald
- Anna Karenina (2009) as Count Vronsky
- Sherlock Holmes (2013) as Wicky, American ambassador
