= Pioneer Heroes =

2015 film

- Directed by: Natalia Kudryashova
- Written by: Natalia Kudryashova
- Starring: Natalia Kudryashova
- Release date: 6 February 2015 (Berlin)
- Running time: 116 minutes
- Country: Russia
- Language: Russian

Pioneer Heroes (Russian: Пионеры-герои, romanized: Pionery-geroi) is a 2015 Russian drama film directed by Natalia Kudryashova. It was screened in the Panorama section of the 65th Berlin International Film Festival. In December 2014, the film had been named best work-in-progress at the "coproduction village" of Les Arcs Film Festival.

== Cast ==
- Natalia Kudryashova
- Darya Moroz
- Alexei Mizin
- Varya Shablakova
- Sima Vybornova
- Nikita Yakovlev
- Yury Kuznetsov
- Aleksandr Userdin
