= Konstantin Bogomolov =

Russian theater director, poet and actor (born 1975)

- Константин Богомолов
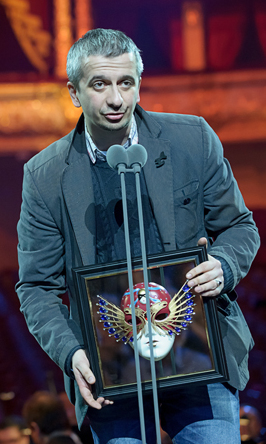
- Bogomolov in 2014
- Born: Konstantin Yuryevich Bogomolov; 23 July 1975 (age 51)
- Occupations: Director; poet; actor
- Spouses: Darya Moroz (m. 2010; div. 2018) Ksenia Sobchak (m. 2019)
- Children: 1

Konstantin Yuryevich Bogomolov (Russian: Константи́н Ю́рьевич Богомо́лов; born July 23, 1975) is a Russian theater director, poet, and actor. He has served as the art director of the Theater on Malaya Bronnaya. He is the son of the film critic Yuri Bogomolov. He has been honoured with a Golden Mask Award.

On 31 October 2026, Latvia banned Konstantin Bogomolov and his wife Ksenia Sobchak from entering the country indefinitely.

== Career ==
=== Poetry ===
In 1990, Bogomolov's poems were published in the literary magazine We and the poetry collection Seventeenth Echo, in 1995 in the almanac Babylon. In 2019, with the book Thus Spoke Bogomolov (AST), the author was included in the short-list of the Andrei Bely Prize in the category poetry.

=== Directing ===
Bogomolov was Andrey Goncharov's student at the Russian Institute of Theatre Arts. Until November 2013, he served as Assistant Artistic Director of the Chekhov Moscow Art Theater. In 2014, he became a staff director of the Lenkom. Since 2012, he has been a teacher at the Moscow School of New Cinema.

At the end of May 2019, it was announced that Konstantin Bogomolov would be appointed artistic director of the Moscow Drama Theater on Malaya Bronnaya. On June 25, 2019, he took up this position.

In 2019, he directed the TV series Gold Diggers, starring his ex-wife Darya Moroz.

== Political views ==
In 2018, he was the confidant of the candidate for mayor of Moscow Sergey Sobyanin.\

=== The Abduction of Europa 2.0 ===
In February 2021, he published The Abduction of Europa 2.0 manifesto in Novaya Gazeta, in which he criticized the New Ethics, and stated that Europe was in a deep ethical crisis, urging Russia to stop focusing on European values. The author's text says that Europe is turning into a new ethical Reich, the standards of which are developed under the influence of queer activists, fem-fanatics and ecopsychopaths. Bogomolov urged the construction of a new right-wing ideology outside of radical orthodoxy, but strictly and irreconcilably defending the values of a complex world based on a complex person.

The manifesto polarized the Russian public.

== Personal life ==
Bogomolov's first wife was the actress Darya Moroz. The couple divorced in 2018. They have a daughter named Anna. His second wife is the journalist Ksenia Sobchak.

Bogomolov is the stepfather of Sobchak's only child, Platon, (born 2016).
