= The Brothers Karamazov (2009 TV series) =

- Genre: Drama
- Written by: Aleksandr Chervinsky
- Directed by: Yuri Moroz
- Starring: Sergey Koltakov; Sergey Gorobchenko; Anatoliy Beliy; Alexander Golubev; Pavel Derevyanko
- Composer: Enri Lolashvili
- Country of origin: Russia
- Original language: Russian
- No. of seasons: 1
- No. of episodes: 8 (TV version); 12 (DVD version)

Production
- Producers: Sergey Danielyan; Ruben Dishdishyan; Aram Movsesyan; Yuri Moroz
- Running time: 52 minutes
- Production companies: Kolibri Studio, produced for Central Partnership

Original release
- Network: Channel One
- Release: May 27, 2009 – 2009

The Brothers Karamazov is a Russian television adaptation of Fyodor Dostoevsky's novel of the same name. Directed and produced by Yuri Moroz, the series aired on Channel One in 2009. The adaptation comprises eight episodes for television broadcast, while the DVD version includes twelve episodes.

== Synopsis ==
Set in a small provincial Russian town in the 19th century, the series centers on the intense conflicts within the Karamazov family. Fyodor Karamazov, a wealthy and depraved patriarch, has three estranged sons: impulsive Dmitri (Mitya), intellectual Ivan, and spiritual Alexei (Alyosha). Tensions escalate as Dmitri and his father become rivals for the affections of Grushenka, a beautiful and capricious woman. Despite a failed reconciliation attempt with his father, Dmitri confides in Alyosha about his guilt over mistreating his fiancée, Katerina Ivanovna, who has remained loyal despite his reckless behavior. A love triangle develops as Ivan harbors feelings for Katerina, who has pledged eternal faithfulness to Dmitri, while crippled Liza confesses her love to Alyosha. The family dynamics grow increasingly strained as Ivan decides to leave, foreseeing impending disaster if Dmitri learns of Grushenka's impending visit to Fyodor.

After Fyodor’s mysterious murder, Dmitri is immediately suspected, as he had publicly threatened his father. Though he denies involvement and suspects their scheming servant Smerdyakov, the evidence mounts against him. During his trial, Ivan's guilt-ridden testimony further implicates Dmitri, while Katerina reveals a damning letter from Dmitri, sealing his conviction. As the trial concludes, Dmitri is sentenced to exile in Siberia, despite Alyosha’s desperate pleas for mercy.

== Cast ==
- Sergey Koltakov as Fyodor Pavlovich Karamazov
- Sergey Gorobchenko as Dmitry Karamazov
- Anatoly Bely as Ivan Karamazov
- Alexander Golubev as Alyosha Karamazov
- Pavel Derevyanko as Pavel Smerdyakov
- Elena Lyadova as Grushenka Svetlova
- Viktoriya Isakova as Katerina Ivanovna
- Dina Korzun as Katerina Khokhlakova
- Mariya Shalaeva as Liza Khokhlakova
- Alexander Parfenovich as Grigory Vasiliev
- Evgeny Merkuryev as Elder Zosima
- Sergey Batalov as Pyotr Perkhotin
- Viktor Perevalov as Landowner Maximov
- Ivan Kokorin as Mikhail Rakitin
- Kirill Grebenshchikov as Jesus Christ
- Leonid Okunev as Staff Captain Nikolai Snegirev
- Natalya Surkova as Arina Snegireva
- Elizaveta Arzamasova as Varvara Snegireva
- Vladimir Bolshov as Investigator Nikolai Nelyudov
- Yuriy Nazarov as Police Chief Mikhail Makarovich
- Andrey Ilyin as Prosecutor Ippolit Kirillovich
- Vitaliy Khaev as Gorstkin
- Alexander Brankevich as Trifon Borisovich
- Fyodor Dobronravov as Mussyailovich
- Elena Podkaminskaya as Agafya Ivanovna
- Yekaterina Primorskaya as Lady in the Choir
- Gleb Petropavlov as Messenger
- Denis Petropavlov as Messenger
- Alexander Bespaly as Father Ilyinsky
- Timofey Tribuntsev

== Filming locations ==
The series was filmed in various locations across Russia and Belarus, including Suzdal, Minsk, Moscow (the Sparrow Hills, former estate of the Mamontov family, the Trubetskoy family estate), and Rossosh (used for scenes set in Mokroe).
