= Gold Diggers (TV series) =

Russian TV series

- Genre: drama, erotic thriller
- Written by: Nana Greenstein (all seasons); Anna Rubtsova (all seasons); Konstantin Bogomolov (seasons 1–2); Andrey Stempkovsky (season 3)
- Directed by: Konstantin Bogomolov (1 season), Darya Zhuk (2 season), Yuri Moroz (3 season)
- Composers: Alexander Bessonov (season 2), Anton Zakharov (season 3)
- Country of origin: Russia
- Original language: Russian
- No. of seasons: 3
- No. of episodes: 24

Original release
- Release: March 7, 2019 – July 29, 2021

Gold Diggers (Russian: Содержанки, romanized: Soderzhanki), also released as Russian Affairs, is a Russian drama series produced by Yellow, Black and White for START. The series is about kept-women and the rich men they have relations with. For theater director Konstantin Bogomolov, the first season of the project was his debut in the genre of episodic series. The streaming series was among the first of its kind in Russia to achieve high ratings. It was sold to Amazon Prime to be distributed under its Originals label in 2019.

It has been compared to Dynasty in the English-speaking press.

== Synopsis ==
Young artist Dasha Smirnova comes from Saratov to Moscow to change her life. She is immersed in the world of glamour and easy money by her school friend Marina Levkoeva, whose only source of income is a relationship with a married official Igor Dolgachev, with whom she met thanks to a matchmaker to the elite in Moscow.

Alisa Olkhovska put more than one beautiful girl in safe hands, and she was able to go from gold digging to being the wife of a prosperous developer. And now she shares with Marina not only social gatherings, but also a young lover, Kir.

Meanwhile, other women have other worries. And while some spend money on another diamond necklace, others are thinking about how to reach a higher salary. This is the reality for investigator Alyona Shirokova, who finds solutions to pressing problems in sex with her lover-colleague Maxim. However, Alyona will soon get acquainted with the beautiful life closer: when the body of one of the girls is found in the toilet of an elite restaurant, and the investigation of this confusing case will reveal to Alyona unattractive secrets of many residents of Moscow.

== Cast ==
=== Main roles ===
Actor	Role
Darya Moroz	Lena Shirokova 35 years old, employee of the criminal investigation department of the Department of the Ministry of Internal Affairs of Russia for the Zamoskvorechye district of Moscow (season 1), curator of the Dasha gallery (season 2), curator of the cluster (season 3), ex-lover of Maxim Glushkov, ex-fiancee of Gleb Olkhovsky
Sofia Ernst	Dasha Smirnova 23 years old, Marina's school friend from Saratov, former lover of Igor and Gleb. In episode 17, she flew to New York to create an exhibition of Asfari's paintings. In episode 24 she returns to Saratov
Sergey Burunov	Igor Dolgachov 45 years old, chairman of the federal administration (up to episode 22), Mila's husband, Marina's lover, Dasha's former lover
Vladimir Mishukov	Gleb Olkhovsky 45 years old, developer, Alisa's husband, Lena's ex-fiance. In episode 24, he was arrested by the prosecutor's office at the airport
Aleksandr Zbruyev	Pyotr Sergeevich 75 years old, Mila's father, holds a high position in the government, a former intelligence officer. Dies in episode 16
Marina Zudina	Lyudmila Dolgachova 45 years old, wife of Igor, mistress of Kirill, goddaughter of Innokenty Mikhailovich, chairman of the federal administration (episode 22-24)
Olga Sutulova	Alisa Olkhovskaya 35 years old, socialite, Gleb's wife, owner of a charitable foundation, Nikita's mistress. Is killed by Gleb in episode 7
Aleksandr Kuznetsov	Kir Somov 25 years old, aspiring actor, lover of Alisa, Marina and Lyudmila. Is killed in episode 17 by Darius
Pyotr Skvortsov	Maksim Glushkov 28 years old, senior lieutenant of the criminal investigation department of the Department of the Ministry of Internal Affairs of Russia for the Zamoskvorechye district of Moscow (season 1-3), head of the Department of the Ministry of Internal Affairs of Russia for the Zamoskvorechye district of Moscow (from episode 23), Lena's colleague and lover
Leonid Bichevin	Nikita Lisin 30 years old, lawyer, Gleb's right hand man, Ulyana's husband, Alisa's lover (1 season). Dies with Ulyana in a car accident arranged by order of Chistyakov in the 15th series
Irina Starshenbaum	Ulyana Lisina 25 years old, wife of Nikita. Dies with Nikita in a car accident arranged by order of Chistyakov in the 15th series

== Reception ==
The series was viewed by over 10 million people on the Russian online platform START in 2019. Amazon Prime Video acquired the first season for distribution in Germany, France, and the Netherlands.

In a review for The Times titled Gold Diggers review — these preposterous sexy Russians are absolute gold, critic Hugo Rifkind suggested that the show could be a slow-burning TV hit.

Aidan Smith, in a television review for The Scotsman, called the series his new favourite guilty pleasure and concluded with the remark: for the good of Scottish-Russian relations I will watch more, try to confirm and report back.

The series received three nominations at the 2020 APKIT Awards, a professional film and television prize presented by the Association of Film and Television Producers of Russia. It was nominated for Best Supporting Actress in a TV Movie/Series (Olga Sutulova), Best Screenplay (Nana Grinshtein, Anna Rubtsova, Konstantin Bogomolov), and Best Film Editing (Ivan Lebedev).
