= Steel Butterfly =

2012 Russian film by Renat Davletyarov

- DVD cover
- Russian: Стальная бабочка
- Directed by: Renat Davletyarov
- Written by: Renat Davletyarov; Yuriy Korotkov; Natalya Vorozhbit
- Produced by: Renat Davletyarov; Aleksandr Kotelevskiy
- Starring: Darya Melnikova; Anatoliy Beliy; Darya Moroz; Pyotr Vins; Andrey Kazakov
- Cinematography: Semyon Yakovlev
- Music by: Roman Dormidoshin
- Release date: November 1, 2012
- Country: Russia
- Language: Russian
- Box office: $1 184 000

Steel Butterfly (Russian: Стальная бабочка, romanized: Stalnaya babochka) is a 2012 Russian crime film directed by Renat Davletyarov. Runaway street children led by Chuma rob various people in order to survive. Suddenly they are caught by the police and now Chuma is forced to become the bait for a serial killer.

== Plot ==
In Moscow, teenage runaway Vika Chumakova, known as "Chuma", escapes from a state orphanage and sustains herself through petty crime with a gang of street kids. After they commit a robbery in a park, the group is apprehended by the police, landing Chuma in the precinct where she meets Captain Grigory Khanin. Khanin and his team are investigating a series of brutal murders targeting young girls with artistic ties, all occurring in isolated parts of the same park. Suspecting a serial killer, Khanin devises a plan to use Chuma as bait, promising her freedom if she cooperates but threatening to send her to juvenile detention if she refuses. Chuma agrees, on the condition that she be released until morning and that her confiscated switchblade be returned. Throughout the investigation, she navigates complex relationships with her street friends and manipulates those around her, including Khanin, with flirtations and provocation.

As Chuma continues aiding Khanin, their dynamic grows increasingly tense and complicated. She becomes involved in stakeouts, even joining Khanin on an outing where he teaches her to shoot, further blurring their relationship boundaries. However, Chuma’s reckless behavior ultimately jeopardizes the operation when she abandons her distress button and disappears during an active search for the killer. Later, she confronts Khanin’s girlfriend, Tatiana, threatening her with a knife in a jealous rage. When the serial killer strikes again, it’s revealed that a police officer, Tolik, is the perpetrator. Chuma confronts him in a violent encounter, leading to Tolik’s capture. Although her actions aid the investigation, Khanin decides to return Chuma to the orphanage, recognizing her volatile nature. She leaves with an unspoken promise to continue seeking independence, but the final scene hints at her lingering trauma and unresolved darkness as she encounters another young girl in the park, torn between harming her and seeking companionship.

== Cast ==
- Darya Melnikova as Vika Chumakova
- Anatoliy Beliy as Grigoriy Khanin
- Darya Moroz as Tatyana
- Pyotr Vins as Kosovskiy
- Andrey Kazakov as Zaytsev
- Elena Galibina as Tamara Nikolaevna
- Maksim Dromashko as Tolik
- Andrey Lebedev as Bondarev
- Konstantin Topolaga as Lieutenant Colonel Timashov
- Semyon Treskunov as 'Dwarf'

== Awards and nominations ==
- 2012 – "Avance" Award from The Hollywood Reporter Russia – "Most Promising Actress" (Darya Melnikova)
- 2012 – Participation in the competition program of the Spanish film festival Muestra de Cine Europeo Ciudad de Segovia (MUCES)
- 2012 – XVIII International Human Rights Film Festival "Stalker" – Jury Diploma (Darya Melnikova)
