= Filipp's Bay =

- Genre: Crime drama
- Directed by: Aleksandr Tsabadze
- Starring: Konstantin Khabensky; Evgeniya Khirivskaya; Yaroslav Boyko; Aleksandr Artenyev
- Composer: Timur Vedernikov
- No. of seasons: 1
- No. of episodes: 8

Production
- Producers: Valery Todorovsky; I. Neretin
- Running time: 45 minutes
- Production company: Rekun TV

Original release
- Network: Russia-1
- Release: 13 February 2006

Filipp's Bay (Russian: Бухта Филиппа, romanized: Bukhta Filippa) is a 2006 Russian crime drama television series directed by Aleksandr Tsabadze.

== Plot ==
Filipp Ronin is a former employee of the prosecutor's office, and now the owner of a small company for repair and maintenance of yachts.

By chance, Filipp falls into the epicenter of urban criminal events. Saving his friend, he successfully investigates the murder. And after the investigation, a close friend of Filipp, a lawyer Oswald, invites him to open a private detective agency ...

== Cast ==
- Konstantin Khabensky as Filipp Ronin
- Evgeniya Khirivskaya as Anastasia Gromova
- Yaroslav Boyko as Oswald
- Alexander Arsentiev as Igor Poplavsky
- Viktoriya Isakova as Oia
- Artyom Tkachenko as Konstantin (Kostya)
- Denis Yakovlev as Yashka
- Farhad Makhmudov as Zoltan
- Alexander Rapoport as Poplavsky, Mayor of Sochi
- Rafael Mukayev as Luke
- Natalia Gatiyatova as Mila Snezhnova
- Alexander Shatokhin as Konev
- Victor Soloviev as old man
- Valentin Varetsky as Gruznov
- Oleksiy Gorbunov as Booth
- Vladimir Kapustin policeman Kulyasov
- Alexander Sirin as Gromov
- Regina Miannik as Katya
- Anastasia Tsvetanovic as Lara
- Andrey Ilin as Ivin
- Irina Lachina as Veronika

== Production ==
Konstantin Khabensky starred in the television series in parallel with the shooting of Day Watch. Valery Todorovsky played an episodic role of a strip club manager. Shooting took place in Gelendzhik and Novorossiysk.
