= The Pilot. A Battle for Survival =

- Theatrical release poster
- Directed by: Renat Davletyarov
- Written by: Renat Davletyarov; Aleksey Timoshkin; Sergey Ashkenazi
- Produced by: Renat Davletyarov; Dmitry Pristanskov; Vlad Ryashin; Grigory Podzemelnyy; Ekaterina Ryzhaya
- Starring: Pyotr Fyodorov; Anna Peskova; Pavel Osadchy; Maksim Yemelyanov; Yevgeny Mikheev; Gela Meskhi
- Cinematography: Semyon Yakovlev
- Edited by: Rod Nikolaychuk
- Music by: Pavel Kovalenko; Roman Voloznev
- Production companies: DAProduction; Interfest; Star Media; Cinema Fund
- Distributed by: Central Partnership
- Release date: 2 December 2021
- Running time: 105 minutes
- Country: Russia
- Language: Russian
- Budget: ₽319 million

The Pilot. A Battle for Survival (Russian: Лётчик, romanized: Lyotchik) is a 2021 Russian WWII film written and directed by Renat Davletyarov, based on the real events surrounding pilot Aleksey Maresyev during World War II (known in Russia as "The Great Patriotic War").

The Pilot. A Battle for Survival was theatrically released in Russia on 2 December 2021 by Central Partnership.

== Plot ==
The film takes place at the beginning of World War II. The film tells about the pilot Nikolai Komlev, who defeated a German tank column, but his plane was shot down. Nikolai was able to land his plane in a forest clearing and suddenly realized that his problems were just beginning.

== Cast ==
- Pyotr Fyodorov as Nikolai Komlev
- Anna Peskova as Olga
- Pavel Osadchy as Mikhail
- Maksim Yemelyanov as Ignat
- Yevgeny Mikheev as Nikodim Greshnev
- Gela Meskhi as Major
- Roman Knizka as Aubert Lemke
- Nikoloz Paikridze as Suladze
- Valery Grishko as blacksmith
- Elena Drobysheva as blacksmith's wife
- Aleksandr Galibin as surgeon
- Irina Medvedeva as Nadezhda
- Maria Poezzhaeva as Zina
- Andrey Ilyin as Misha 's dad

== Production ==
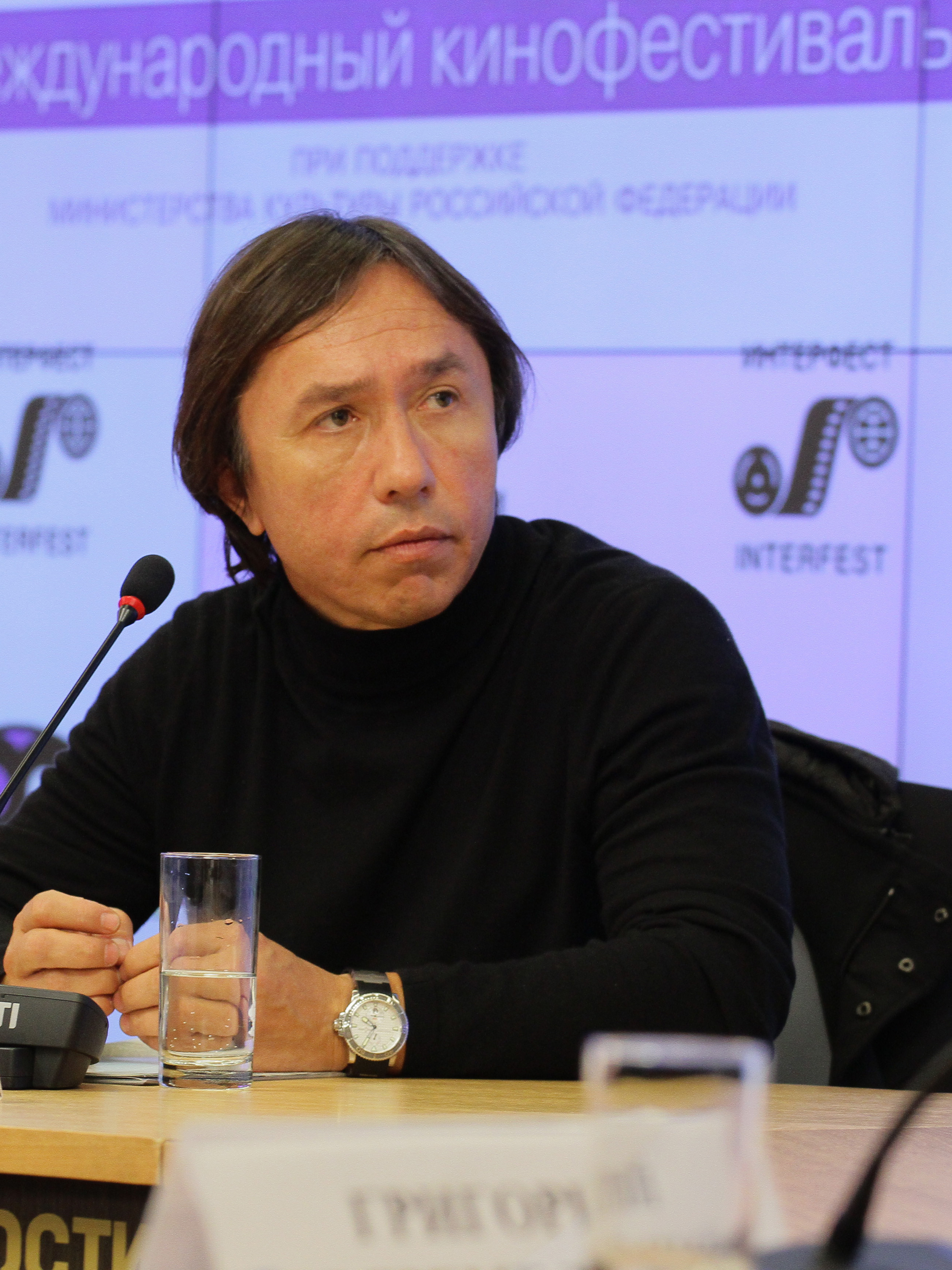
Directed by Renat Davletyarov

The film was produced in collaboration with the Russian Ministry of Culture and the Russian Film Foundation. Director Renat Davletyarov called the film his version of The Revenant.

=== Filming ===
Some of the scenes (the hospital) were filmed in the autumn and winter of 2018 at the Pokrovskoye-Streshnevo estate.

Principal photography began in January 2019 in the Novgorod Oblast. They went including in the Demyansky District, where in 1942 Aleksey Maresyev's plane was shot down. In addition to outdoor filming, there was filming in one of the pavilions of the Mosfilm Studios, against a green background, which was later replaced by another.

== Release ==
=== Marketing ===
The first teaser trailer of The Pilot. A Battle for Survival was released on 3 January 2021.

=== Theatrical ===
The premiere was scheduled for 1 May, International Workers' Day, but was later postponed to 4 November. After it was closed due to another wave of the quarantine plague in Russia, its release was postponed to 2 December 2021.

The premiere screening took place on 30 November at the "Karo 11 October" cinema center in Moscow. It was released in the Russian Federation on 2 December 2021 by Central Partnership.

== See also ==
- Tale of a True Man is a 1948 Soviet film, also based on the story of Aleksey Maresyev.
