= Renat Davletyarov =

Russian film producer, director and screenwriter

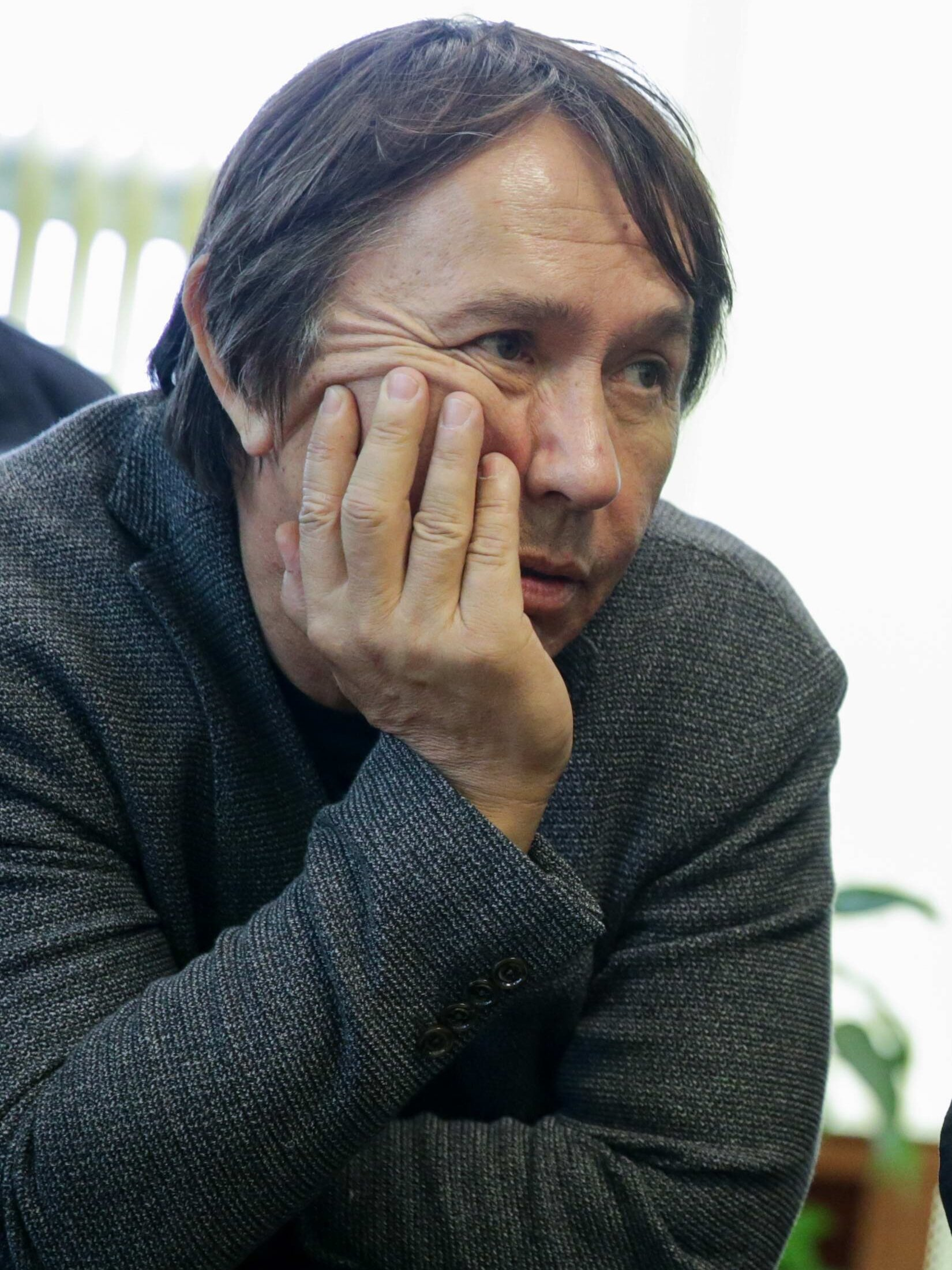
Davletyarov in 2019

Renat Favarisovich Davletyarov (Russian: Рена́т Фавари́сович Давлетья́ров; born August 17, 1961, Astrakhan, USSR) is a Russian film director, film producer and screenwriter. President of the Guild of Producers of Russia.

== Biography ==
Davletyarov was born to a Tatar father and Russian mother.

== Career ==
Best known as the creator of the films Steel Butterfly, The Dawns Here Are Quiet, and The Pilot. A Battle for Survival.

In 2014 he married the singer and actress, Reflex's ex-soloist Yevgenia Malakhova (October 28, 1988). In 2019, the couple broke up.
