= Vorona (TV series) =

- Ворона
- Genre: Detective, Thriller
- Created by: Olga Angelova, Yevgeny Sosnitsky
- Directed by: Olga Angelova, Yevgeny Sosnitsky (1st season), Alyona Mikhailova (2nd season)
- Starring: Elizaveta Boyarskaya, Anatoliy Beliy, Vitaly Kovalenko, Artyom Karasyov, Igor Chernevich
- Country of origin: Russia
- Original language: Russian
- No. of seasons: 2
- No. of episodes: 24

Production
- Producer: Valery Todorovsky
- Cinematography: Yevgeny Koroptsov
- Running time: Approx. 50 minutes

Original release
- Network: NTV
- Release: October 29, 2018

Vorona (Russian: Ворона) is a Russian detective thriller television series that premiered on NTV on October 29, 2018. Created by Olga Angelova and Evgeny Sosnitsky, the series combines elements of mystery and suspense with a character-focused narrative. The title of the series references the protagonist's last name, Vorontsova, which resembles the Russian word vorona, meaning "crow".

== Premise ==
The series follows Anna Vorontsova, a former pianist who transitions into an investigator role in Russia's Investigative Committee, defying her family's expectations and her own past aspirations. The narrative centers on her pursuit of justice while also exploring her inner conflicts and her evolution within a demanding profession.

== Cast ==
- Elizaveta Boyarskaya as Anna Vorontsova
- Anatoliy Beliy as Sergey Kabanov
- Vitaly Kovalenko as Dima
- Artyom Karasyov as Kostya
- Igor Chernevich as Kovalevsky

== Production ==
Vorona was produced by Valery Todorovsky, with filming taking place primarily in St. Petersburg and the Leningrad region. Actress Elizaveta Boyarskaya expressed admiration for her character, describing Anna as both a "fighter" and "vulnerable," and appreciated the challenge of portraying such a multifaceted role.

== Release ==
The series first aired on October 29, 2018, on NTV. The second season premiered on the streaming platform Okko in 2022.
