= The Dawns Here Are Quiet (2015 film) =

The Dawns Here Are Quiet (А зори здесь тихие…)
- Directed by: Renat Davletyarov
- Written by: Yuri Korotkov; Artyom Vitkin; Renat Davletyarov
- Produced by: Renat Davletyarov; Vlad Ryashin
- Starring: Pyotr Fyodorov; Anastasia Mikulchina; Evgenia Malakhova; Agniya Kuznetsova
- Cinematography: Semyon Yakovlev
- Music by: Roman Dormidoshin
- Production companies: Real Dakota; Interfest; Star Media; Nashe Kino
- Release date: May 9, 2015
- Running time: 111 minutes
- Country: Russia
- Language: Russian

The Dawns Here Are Quiet (Russian: А зори здесь тихие…, romanized: A zori zdes tikhiye…) is a 2015 Russian war drama directed by Renat Davletyarov.

Like the well-known 1972 movie, it is based on the 1969 novel The Dawns Here Are Quiet by Boris Vasilyev.

== Plot ==
Sergeant major Vaskov and five young antiaircraft gunwomen confront a group of experienced saboteurs, who are sent by the Nazis into a railway junction, which is far from the frontline, but is of strategic importance. Vaskov and the women will have to prevent the sabotage, but pay the highest price for it…

== Cast ==
- Pyotr Fyodorov — foreman Fedot Evgrafovich Vaskov, commandant of the junction
- Anastasia Mikulchina — junior sergeant Rita Osyanina, squad leader
- Yevgenia Malakhova — Zhenya Komelkova
- Agniya Kuznetsova — Sonya Gurvich
- Sofia Lebedeva — Liza Brichkina
- Kristina Asmus — Galya Chetvertak
- Ekaterina Vilkova — senior sergeant Kiryanova
- Anatoliy Beliy — comrade "Third", major
- Darya Moroz — Mary, the landlady of the foreman
- Victor Proskurin — postman Makarych
- Maksim Drozd — Alexei Luzhin, beloved Komelkova
- Alexey Barabash — guest of the Brichkins
- Olga Lomonosova — mother of Chetvertak
- Ilya Alekseyev — lieutenant-border guard Osyanin, husband of Rita
- Natalya Batrak — mother of Osyanina
- Valeriy Grishko — father Brichkina
- Yevgenia Ulyanova — mother of Brichkina
- Sergey Vidineyev — father of Komelkova
- Yulia Silayeva — mother of Komelkova
- Alina Babak — Nadya, the younger sister of Zhenya Komelkova
- Yelena Medvedeva — Vera Iosifovna, mother of Sonya Gurvich
- Ilya Yermolov — son of Sonya Gurvich
- Vasilisa Kucherenko — young Galya Chetvertak
- Alesya Guzko — young Liza Brichkina
- Yulia Polynskaya — the woman with washload
- Nadezhda Azorkina — Polina Yegorovna Yegorova
- Maksim Dromashko — NKVD lieutenant
- Yevgeniy Kostin — antiaircraft gunner
- Yulia Kuykka — antiaircraft gunner
- Archibald Archibaldovich (Artur Yenikeyev) — German saboteur
- Nina Krachkovskaya - episodic role
- Sergei Garmash — the narrator

== Television version ==
An extended version made out of four 45 minute episodes was released on Channel One Russia, on 9 May 2016.
