= Mira (2022 film) =

- Theatrical release poster
- Directed by: Dmitry Kiselyov
- Written by: Timofei Dekin; Ekaterina Mavromatis; Sergey Kaluzhanov; Narek Martirosyan
- Produced by: Ruben Dishdishyan; Len Blavatnik; Narek Martirosyan; Nataliya Klibanova; Yuliya Ivanova; Andrey Korobov; Kseniya Kiseleva
- Starring: Veronika Ustimova; Anatoliy Beliy; Alexander Petrov; Yevgeny Yegorov; Darya Moroz; Maksim Lagashkin; Kirill Zaytsev; Andrey Smolyakov
- Cinematography: Vladimir Bashta
- Edited by: Alexey Kumakshin
- Music by: Yuri Poteyenko
- Production companies: AMedia; Mars Media Entertainment; Cinema Fund
- Distributed by: Atmosfera Kino
- Release dates: December 18, 2022 (Russia); December 22, 2022 (worldwide)
- Running time: 116 minutes
- Country: Russia
- Language: Russian
- Budget: ₽540 million
- Box office: ₽311,5 million; $5.5 million

Mira (Russian: Мира) is a 2022 Russian science-fiction disaster film directed by Dmitry Kiselyov about a fictional asteroid impact on the city of Vladivostok and an astronaut father's subsequent attempts to locate and save his family while on board a space station. The film emphasizes family values and love for one's family and friends. It stars Veronika Ustimova and Anatoliy Beliy.

It was theatrically released on December 22, 2022. In Russia, the film was released on the night of December 18, 2022, as promoted by Channel One.

== Plot ==
15-year-old Valeria ‘Lera’ Arabova lives in Vladivostok with her mother Svetlana, stepfather Boris and 8-year-old step-brother Yegor. She suffers from pyrophobia after surviving a fire inside an elevator when she was younger, which led to her parents’ divorce. Her father, flight engineer Valery Arabov, member of space station Mira, uses satellite technology and artificial intelligence to monitor her, but both remain otherwise estranged.

Arabov's team watches a meteor shower expected to appear above the Western Pacific and to be harmless, despite his colleague Igor Khripunov's warnings on the possibility of changes in its size and trajectory, which occur at last minute, impacting the station as well as vast areas in Far East Russia, Korea, Japan, and Australasia. Lera witnesses the impact and narrowly escapes her building, running into her school friend Misha, when a blast separates them and causes her to be hit by a middle-aged couple and their cat in a van attempting to escape the destruction. They drive her to a hospital before crashing and abandoning the vehicle. As a nearby building collapses, Lera shelters inside a toy store, but is trapped by the debris.

Arabov regains consciousness to find that he is the sole survivor in the station, and assisted by Mira's AI system, manages to restore the energy supply, locates Svetlana in a hospital and contacts Lera. Her cell phone is damaged but he connects to a baby monitor teddy bear next to her, and instructs her to grab it to remain in communication, while she is pulled out by a rescue team. He calls Svetlana, who is at the hospital with Boris hoping to find Yegor among his classmates, but Lera recalls having given Yegor her binoculars the night before, encouraging him to skip classes and watch the meteor shower from a nearby building, where she now heads to rescue him. Arabov scans the building, which Mira warns to be too unstable, but unable to deter Lera, he guides her inside to rescue Yegor, and guides them along a safe path by connecting to traffic lights and other devices.

Lera and Yegor reach the shore, where helicopters are ferrying survivors to a safe area, when an explosion on an oil vessel occurs. She begs a soldier to take her brother on board a helicopter, from which Misha gets off and gives up his seat for Yegor to be carried off. Arabov calls Misha's phone and informs Lera that all rescue activities will stop as further explosions will happen shortly in another vessel, which might destroy half the city, and urges them to escape, but Lera berates him and throws Misha's phone. Misha agrees to help her and both take a boat and board the vessel. In the station, Mira's system urges Arabov to crawl into the escape pod as they will enter Earth's atmosphere soon, but he refuses and disconnects the AI voice system to regain connection with Lera, whom he guides towards the fire system valve. A fire blast knocks Misha unconscious, causing Lera to have a breakdown; Arabov comforts her and instructs her to put on the fireproof gear and activate the valve, which she manages to do while the station catches fire upon entering the atmosphere, killing Arabov. Lera and Misha are rescued and taken to the hospital, where she reunites with her family.

== Cast ==
- Veronika Ustimova as Valeria "Lera" Arabova
- Anatoliy Beliy as Valery Arabov, an astronaut and Valeria’s father
- Alexander Petrov as Egor, Valeria's younger brother
- Yevgeny Yegorov as Misha, Valeria's friend
- Darya Moroz as Svetlana, Valeria's mother
- Maksim Lagashkin as Boris, Svetlana's second husband, and Valeria's stepfather
- Kirill Zaytsev as Antonov, an astronaut, Arabov's commander
- Igor Khripunov as Ryabinov, a colleague of Arabov and Antonov
- Andrey Smolyakov as Fomin, a high-ranking officer of the Mission Control Center
- Kristina Korbut as Olya
- Marina Burtseva as Tanya

== Production ==
The disaster film Mira was presented to Russia's Cinema Foundation in 2021 but did not receive the grant.

The film was directed by Dmitry Kiselyov, the main roles were given to Veronika Ustimova and Anatoliy Beliy. Mars Media Entertainment film company was responsible for the production of the film together with AMedia, with the support of Cinema Foundation.

A project with a budget of ₽540 million, the film received funding in the amount of 187 million rubles only once. In the summer of 2022, the production companies requested another ₽163 million from Cinema Foundation.

=== Filming ===
Saturated principal photography lasted from early August to early November 2021 in Moscow, the region of Moscow Oblast, and Vladivostok.

=== Post-production ===
The visual effects were handled by Main Road Post, who had previously worked on the films Attraction (2017 film) and Invasion (2020 film).

=== Marketing ===
The first teaser trailer of Mira was released on October 24, 2022.

=== Theatrical ===
Mira premiered worldwide on December 22, 2022, by "Cinema Atmosphere" Film Distribution. In Russia, it premiered on December 18, 19:00 Moscow time in theaters (December 19 elsewhere in Russia).
