= Sergei Dobrotvorsky =

Russian actor

Sergei Dobrotvorsky

Sergei Nikolaevich Dobrotvorsky (Russian: Сергей Николаевич Добротворский; January 22, 1959, Leningrad — August 27, 1997, St. Petersburg) was a Soviet and Russian actor, director and screenwriter, film critic, journalist. Member of the Union of Cinematographers of the Russian Federation. Member of the expert commission of the State Film Agency of Russia. Member of FIPRESCI. Author of more than six hundred publications on the history and theory of cinema, reviews, reviews, etc., published in Russia, the CIS countries and abroad.

He died on August 27, 1997, in St. Petersburg from a heroin overdose. Buried at the Smolensky Cemetery.
