= Once Upon a Time in the Provinces =

2008 film

- Directed by: Katya Shagalova
- Written by: Katya Shagalova
- Produced by: Sergey Danielyan; Aram Movsesyan; Yuri Moroz; Ruben Dishdishyan
- Starring: Leonid Bichevin; Elvira Bolgova; Yuliya Peresild
- Cinematography: Yevgeni Privin
- Edited by: Marat Magambetov
- Music by: Alexey Shelygin
- Distributed by: CP Classic
- Release date: June 2008
- Running time: 100 minutes
- Country: Russia
- Language: Russian

Once Upon a Time in the Provinces (Russian: Однажды в провинции, translit. Odnazhdy v provintsii) is a 2008 Russian drama film written and directed by Katya Shagalova. It was entered into the 30th Moscow International Film Festival where it won the FIPRESCI Prize.

== Plot ==
The quiet, slow-paced life of a remote provincial town is suddenly disrupted when Nastya, a star of a popular TV series, arrives. Her fame has faded, leaving her with no one to turn to but her estranged sister Vera. However, Vera is initially reluctant to welcome Nastya due to a long-standing conflict between Nastya and Vera’s husband, Kolya. Disillusioned with life and herself, Nastya attempts to start over. Meanwhile, every evening, young men and women gather in the courtyard of a dormitory, restless in a town that offers no opportunities. Love abounds, but often misplaced or unrequited, as everyone harbors hidden lives and secrets. With Nastya’s arrival, tensions among friends escalate, buried secrets surface, and hidden passions stir the town into a frenzy. Just as change seems possible, a sudden tragedy returns life to its familiar patterns.

== Cast ==
- Igor Afanasev
- Leonid Bichevin
- Elvira Bolgova
- Alexandr Golubev
- Yuliya Peresild
- Lyubov Tolkalina
