= Kamenskaya (TV series) =

Russian television series

Kamenskaya (Russian: Каменская), is a Russian detective television series filmed from 1999 through 2011. The format of the series features several (from two up to four) 50-minutes episodes arranged into minifilms. The television series follows the work of an operative officer Anastasiya Kamenskaya (played by Elena Yakovleva) at the Criminal Investigations Department in Moscow. The series has six seasons and overall contains 84 episodes.

== Plot ==
The series unfolds in the late 1990s to early 2000s in Moscow. Crime has spiraled out of control for law enforcement, and Police Major Anastasiya Kamenskaya conducts investigations into criminal activities. Frequently, the crimes she investigates involve or are even linked to influential individuals: politicians, businessmen, heads of major criminal organizations. However, in addition to enemies within the system, Kamenskaya encounters friends ready to assist her.

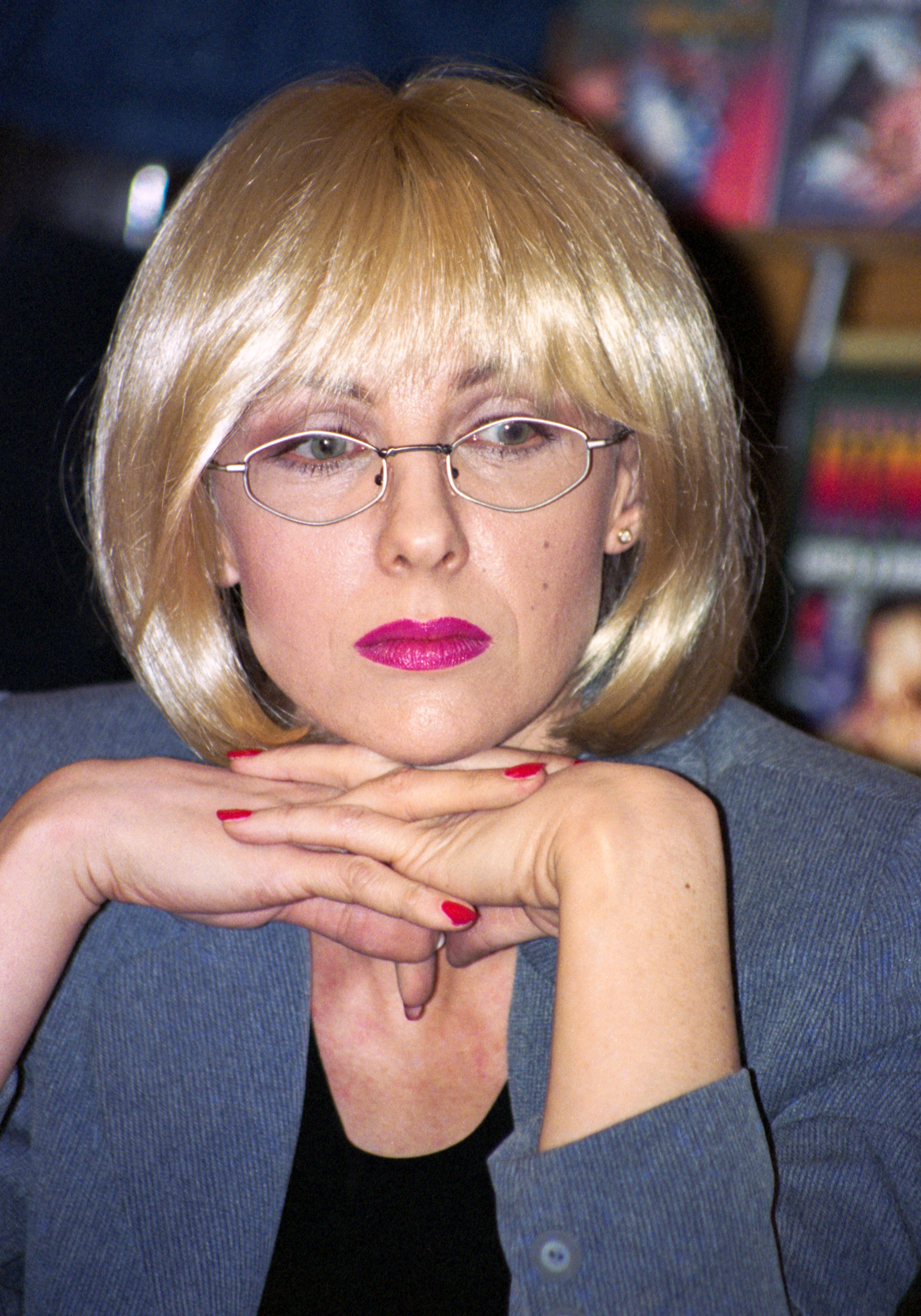
Elena Yakovleva portraying Kamenskaya, 2000

== Cast ==
- Elena Yakovleva as Anastasiya Kamenskaya, investigator, major of police. Appears in seasons 1–6.
- Sergei Nikonenko as Viktor Gordeev, head of the second branch of the Criminal Investigation Department. Appears in seasons 1–6.
- Sergei Garmash as Yuri Korotkov, major of police. Appears in seasons 1–4.
- Andrey Ilyin as Alexey Chistyakov, Kamenskaya's husband. Appears in seasons 1–6.
- Stanislav Duzhnikov as Mikhail Dotsenko, captain of police. Appears in seasons 2–6.
- Dmitry Nagiyev as Mokhail Lesnikov, captain of police. Appears in seasons 1–4, 6.
- Andrei Panin as Vladislav Stasov, private investigator. Appears in seasons 1–3, 5–6.
- Dmitry Kharatyan as Alexander Kamenskiy, Kamenskaya's brother. Appears in seasons 1–3.
- Boris Nevzorov as Konstantin Olshanskiy, investigator at the Investigation Committee. Appears in seasons 1–3, 5–6.
- Natalya Shvets as Irina Milovanova, a friend of Tomilina and Dotsenko's wife. Appears in seasons 2–6.
- Irina Rozanova as Tatiana Tomilina, Kamenskaya's friend and investigator. Appears in seasons 2–3, 5–6.
- Oleg Andreev as Pavel Dyuzhin, captain of police. Appears in seasons 5–6.
- Pavel Barshak as Igor Doroshin, divisional inspector. Appears in season 6.

== Episodes ==
=== Kamenskaya-1 (1999-2000) ===
==== Coincidence (Episode 1-2) ====
Major of police Anastasiya Kamenskaya gets a promotion and moves to Petrovka, to the second branch of the Criminal Investigation Department led by Viktor Gordeev. She starts investigating the mysterious murder of a Ministry of Internal Affairs employee. Externally, it all looks like an unfortunate accident, but Kamenskaya doesn't believe it and is determined to uncover the truth.

==== Playing on someone else's turf (Episode 3-4) ====
Kamenskaya gets a vacation and goes to a sanatorium. There, the woman plans to relax and dedicate time to her hobby — translating foreign detectives. Eventually, Kamenskaya gets involved in a new investigation: she seeks to find the organizer of underground filming scenes of real murders.

==== Involuntary killer (Episode 5-6) ====
Kamenskaya's stepbrother, a thriving businessman, turns to his sister for help, suspecting that his girlfriend might be an accomplice. Simultaneously, a police officer is murdered in the city. Initially appearing unrelated, these cases eventually become intertwined.

==== Death for the sake of death (Episode 7-8) ====
Kamenskaya is investigating a series of murders that lead her to a classified research institute. There, a group of researchers is developing a device whose radiation can influence the human psyche. It turns out that the FSB is involved in the case, posing a threat to Kamenskaya.

==== Underlings die first (Episode 9-10) ====
In the Moscow suburbs, people die every Sunday. All the murders are linked by the killer's signature – a shot to the head. Suspicion falls on Kamenskaya's colleague, hence she urgently tries to find the criminal to save her associate.

==== Death and a bit of love (Episode 11-12) ====
Kamenskaya investigates murders happening in the registry offices of the capital. On the same day, several brides were shot. It turns out that Kamenskaya, who is about to get married, finds herself in the same registry office with the killer.

==== Stranger's mask (Episode 13-14) ====
The author of popular romance novels is killed in his own building. One of his fans confesses to the murder and ends her own life in Kamenskaya's office in Petrovka. The deceased's widow intends to publish his final work and demands an exorbitant fee. Kamenskaya suggests having the manuscript examined, and finds several interesting details to be investigated.

==== Do not disturb the executioner (Episode 15-16) ====
Kamenskaya receives an unusual assignment: she should meet and help a recently released prisoner safely reach Moscow, as he is being pursued by several criminal organizations and private individuals. Soon after, peculiar murders begin to occur in Moscow, and the operative officer meets her ward again.

=== Kamenskaya-2 (2002) ===
==== Stolen dream (Episode 1-4) ====
Kamenskaya begins to investigate the murder of a secretary from a well-known firm. After talking to the deceased's friend, she finds out that the secretary provided intimate services to wealthy men and had alcohol problems. Additionally, the woman had been haunted by a terrifying dream: a screaming woman appeared to he with sharp scissors in her hands. Shortly before the murder, the deceased confessed to her friend that someone had learned about her dream and broadcast it on the radio.

==== I died yesterday (Episode 5-8) ====
The story revolves around a popular TV presenter. Two employees of his show die in a car explosion, prompting an investigation. Soon, the TV host discovers that his wife hired a hitman to kill him.

==== Men's games (Episode 9-12) ====
A professor at the Police Academy orders the murder of a bank employee. It turns out that the intended victim has a criminal past and joined the bank with a purpose, but he was recognized by the bank's head of security. Now, both the bank employees find themselves in danger.

==== Everything has a price (Episode 13-16) ====
In a secret laboratory, experiments are conducted on people who take a certain balm that enhances work performance. However, the experiment fails, and people die. Kamenskaya takes on the investigation, but is being tempted by her old enemy, Arsen.

=== Kamenskaya-3 (2003) ===
==== Illusion of sin (Episode 1-4) ====
Six years ago, a woman threw herself out of a window with her three children, leaving herself and her heirs disabled. The only one left unharmed is the eldest daughter, who does everything to support the family. She learns that a certain Uncle Sasha visits her mother and sisters in the clinic, someone she has never heard of. At the same time, people who might have information about this man start dying.

==== When gods laugh (Episode 5-8) ====
During a performance by the "BBC" band in a nightclub, a visitor makes rude remarks about the lead singer. Someone closely watches the troublemaker, and on the same night, the man dies. Kamenskaya finds out that the deceased is not the first victim. The only thing all the murders have in common is that the victims attended the band's concerts.

==== Stylist (Episode 9-12) ====
A new series of murders begins in Moscow, with all victims linked by drug addiction and business cards from the same club. The latest body was found near a country mansion. Arriving at the scene, Kamenskaya meets her former lover. The investigation begins, and it turns out that all the victims were also acquainted with one person.

==== The seventh victim (Episode 13-16) ====
Kamenskaya and her female colleague take part in a teleconference titled "Women in Unusual Professions." On air, the host reads a message from a viewer containing a threat, but it is unclear which of the policewomen it is addressed to. Meanwhile, a woman who passed the message to the host is killed. The female detectives start checking their former suspects, and an unknown killer earns the nickname "Jester."

=== Kamenskaya-4 (2005) ===
==== Personal file (Episode 1-4) ====
After the investigation of the Jester case, Kamenskaya wants to quit her job. She has nightmares about the maniac. However, she becomes involved in a new case. Afterwards, she and her husband go on vacation by the sea, but he has to leave early due to work. At the same time, Kamenskaya finds out that a colleague is in love with her husband. Meanwhile, Investigator Ermilov and his wife Olga are going through a crisis. Olga is having an affair with Dudarev, whose wife Elena catches them in bed. She demands a divorce and later dies in a car explosion. A blind man becomes a witness to the accident.

==== Shadow of the past (Episode 5-8) ====
Several young people partied and drank alcohol by the sea. Years later, a woman returns home from vacation earlier than she had planned and finds a film with a naked woman. Her husband says it is a friend's cassette, but she does not believe it and hires a detective to track him. It turns out that her husband is involved in the murder case of the woman.

==== Doppelganger (Episode 9-12) ====
A new governor is elected in the city of Primorsk, but a criminal boss does not want to share power with him and hires a hitman. Another criminal, whom Kamenskaya put in jail, takes on the job. The killer is replaced by an actor in prison, and each of them starts a new life.

=== Kamenskaya-5 (2008) ===
==== Requiem (Episode 1-2) ====
A young police officer dies in Moscow under unknown circumstances, and his girlfriend becomes a witness to the crime. Kamenskaya meets the deceased's girlfriend and notices a ring on her hand that was featured in the case of the murder of a high-ranking official's wife. The crime was never solved, and the missing jewelry has not been seen for a long time.

==== The victim's name is nobody (Episode 3-4) ====
Kamenskaya goes to Saint Petersburg, where she investigates the murder of a well-known dentist, whose body was found by his son. During the investigation, it turns out that the young man is the stepson of the dentist: his biological father was the leader of a criminal group shot in the 1980s.

==== Howling dogs of loneliness (Episode 5-6) ====
Many years ago, the head of the criminal investigation, Gordeev, witnessed a crime and arrested a maniac. The criminal escaped from a psychiatric clinic and killed a girl at the school that Gordeev's daughter attends. The deceased turns out to be the heiress of the investigator who handled that case. Gordeev and Kamenskaya try to find the maniac before he reaches the daughter of the head of the criminal investigation.

==== Posthumous image (Episode 7-8) ====
Kamenskaya and Gordeev go to Finland as part of an experience exchange program, and they have an opportunity to showcase their skills in a case. In the hotel where they stay, a young Russian actress is killed, and all her colleagues become suspects because each had a motive.

==== Coauthors (Episode 9-10) ====
The wife of a prominent restaurateur is killed, and Kamenskaya initially suspects him. However, it turns out that the deceased had a lover. Talking to him was impossible because the man committed suicide, accusing the restaurateur of everything. The FSB intervenes in the case.

==== Law of three denials (Episode 11-12) ====
After an unsuccessful fall, Kamenskaya broke her leg and ended up in the hospital. Two months later, with no improvement, a colleague advises her to see a psychologist. But before Kamenskaya can contact her, the psychologist is killed. Shortly before her death, the psychologist had a conflict with a secret client.

=== Kamenskaya-6 (2011) ===
==== Impossible to remember (Episode 1-2) ====
The murder of a prosecutor's colleague occurs, and a man, who had previously threatened her, is detained on suspicion of committing the crime. The man's fiancée died in a car accident caused by a drunk driver, but the prosecutor acquitted the culprit in court. Kamenskaya is heading to a provincial town where the car crash happened.

==== Simple combination (Episode 3-4) ====
A woman is killed in Moscow. Her husband, with whom she was going to divorce, and her new lover are suspected of the crime. However, the investigation is hindered by the fact that both men are impossible to locate.

==== City fare (Episode 5-6) ====
The fiancée of a high-ranking official suddenly disappears in Moscow, and her body is found in the apartment of an employee of a construction company after a day. The man is not at home, and his sister recognizes the victim as her brother's fiancée. The detectives suspect that the murder was committed out of jealousy.

==== Object replacement (Episode 7-8) ====
Together with her husband, Kamenskaya goes to the theater to see the premiere play of an acquaintance. On the way out, she accidentally encounters a hitman and avoids death, but another woman and her bodyguard die instead.

==== Black list (Episode 9-10) ====
Before the opening of a film festival, organizers begin receiving threatening letters. Gordeev sends Kamenskaya to the event as he does not believe in the seriousness of the words in the notes. However, by the time she arrives, a young actress has died.

==== Spring for a mousetrap (Episode 11-12) ====
A famous writer is killed in Moscow, and Kamenskaya is assigned to the investigation. A man comes to the detective, claiming that he was supposed to meet the writer shortly before her death because she had information about his father, who was convicted 13 years ago for serial murders.

== Production and broadcast ==
The series was adapted from detective novels by Alexandra Marinina. The primary filming of all the six seasons of "Kamenskaya" took place in Belarus at the Belarusfilm studio. Additional interior scenes of the first season were shot at the Moscow Criminal Investigation Department located at Petrovka 38. Interior scenes of the later seasons were shot in the studio in Belarus.

The production of the first season of "Kamenskaya" was considered one of the most expensive on Russian television, with 50% of the funding provided by the publishing house Eksmo. The first season was initially released in late 1999 in the format of videotape with 8 films, each consisting of 2 episodes. The season premiered on the NTV channel in late 1999-early 2000.

From 2002 to 2011, "Kamenskaya" premiered solely on the RTR channel.

=== Production crew ===
- Written by: Yuri Moroz (1–3), Alexandra Marinina (1), Elena Karavaeshnikova (1), Ramil Yamaleev (1), Alexander Polozov (1-6), Natalya Tokareva (1-5), Marina Krymova (2-3), Elena Prokhorova (3), Valentin Emelyanov (3-4), Denis Karyshev (4-6), Dmitry Zverkov (5), Ekaterina Tirdatova (5-6), Svetlana Frichinskaya (6)
- Director: Yuri Moroz (1–3), Alexander Aravin (4), Anton Sivers (5), Marat Kim (6), Egor Anashkin (6)
- Composer: Alexei Aigui (1-2), Darin Sysoev (3-5), Yuri Alyabov (6)
- Producer: Vladlen Arsenyev (1), Valeriy Todorovsky (1-5), Ilya Neretin (3-6)

== Remake ==
In 2018, Elena Yakovleva mentioned in an interview with the newspaper Izvestia that there was a possibility of filming the seventh season of "Kamenskaya". The actress stated that if the filming were to commence, she would be ready to participate in it. As Marinina later conveyed in an interview with TASS, scripts for a remake were prepared in 2018, but due to the COVID-19 pandemic, the filming did not start. As of September 2023, the production team for the new project had already been assembled.

== Awards ==
- 2004 — Elena Yakovleva became the winner of the Russian national television award TEFI in the nomination "Female Actor in a Television Film/Series" for her performance in the third season of "Kamenskaya".

== See also ==
- Kamenskaya-1 at IMDb
- Kamenskaya-2 at IMDb
- Kamenskaya-3 at IMDb
- Kamenskaya-4 at IMDb
- Kamenskaya-5 at IMDb
- Kamenskaya-6 at IMDb
