= Agniya Kuznetsova =

Russian theater and film actress (born 1985)

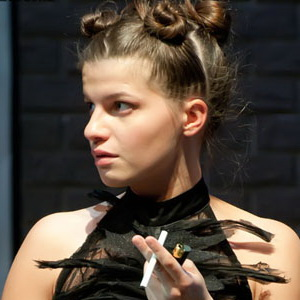
- Agniya Kuznetsova in character at the premiere of "Closer" in 2010
- Born: Agniya Evgenevna Kuznetsova; 15 July 1985 (age 41); Novosibirsk, RSFSR, USSR
- Occupation: Actress
- Years active: 2005–present
- Spouse: Maxim Petrov (m. 2015)

Agniya Evgenevna Kuznetsova (Russian: Агния Евгеньевна Кузнецова; born 15 July 1985) is a Russian theater and film actress. She appeared in more than twenty films since 2005.

== Biography ==
Agniya Kuznetsova was born in Novosibirsk, Russian SFSR, Soviet Union. Her father was an artist and her mother, Maya Byadova, was a teacher of arts and crafts of the Art Institute of Novosibirsk State Pedagogical University. She graduated from high school in Novosibirsk and attended drama school.

In 2006 she graduated from the Boris Shchukin Theatre Institute (course Yuri Shlykov).

== Personal life ==
She dated her classmate at the theater institute, actor Leonid Bichevin. In 2015 she married Maxim Petrov.

== Selected filmography ==
Year	Title	Role	Notes
2007	Cargo 200	Angelika	
2008	Everybody Dies but Me	Zhanna	
2009	Hot Ice	Asya Samsonova	TV series
2010	The Phobos	Vika	
2010	Tower	Zanoza	TV series
2012	Brief Guide To A Happy Life	girl	TV series
2014	Yes and yes	Sasha	
2015	The Dawns Here Are Quiet	Sonya Gurvich	
2016	Leo & Tig	Leo	voice
