= Chagall — Malevich =

2014 Russian film

- Directed by: Alexander Mitta
- Written by: Alexander Mitta
- Produced by: Larisa Shneiderman, Alexander Mitta
- Starring: Leonid Bichevin, Anatoliy Beliy, Christina Schneider
- Cinematography: Sergey Machilsky
- Production companies: "Marmot-Film", "ShiM-Film"
- Release date: 3 April 2014
- Running time: 119 minutes
- Country: Russia
- Language: Russian

Chagall — Malevich (Russian: Шагал — Малевич) is a 2014 Russian biographical drama film directed by Alexander Mitta about the Vitebsk period in the life of the artist Marc Chagall and his relationship with fellow artist Kazimir Malevich. The film was released on April 3, 2014. It is the last film directed by Alexander Mitta. It also showed at the 2014 Busan International Film Festival.

== Plot ==
The film focuses on Marc Chagall's early years in Soviet Russia, specifically during his time in Vitebsk, where he takes the first significant steps in his artistic career. After returning to his hometown, Chagall establishes an art academy and a museum that houses one of the finest collections of Russian avant-garde art. In an effort to elevate the art scene, he invites Kazimir Malevich, the creator of Black Square, to teach at the school, despite Malevich’s struggles with hunger in Petrograd, marking the beginning of their complex relationship.

Their initial friendship gradually evolves into creative rivalry, which eventually escalates into intense animosity. Chagall's vision of artistic harmony faces resistance not only from the political environment and social unrest of the time but also from personal betrayals. As he navigates these challenges, his work and relationships, particularly with his wife Bella, become crucial to his perseverance. Meanwhile, Malevich’s growing estrangement and the intensifying tensions between the two artists reflect the broader turmoil of the period.

== Cast ==
- Leonid Bichevin - Marc Chagall
- Christina Schneider - Bella Rosenfeld, wife of Chagall
- Anatoliy Beliy as Kazimir Malevich
- Semyon Shkalikov - Naum
- Dmitry Astrakhan - Rebbe Aizik, rabbi
- Alexey Ovsyannikov - Zheleznyak
- Jacob Levda - Leva, student of Chagall
- Sergey Migitsko - Israel Vulfovich Vishnyak
- Tatyana Likhacheva - Vishnyak's wife
- Semyon Mendelssohn - Trotsky
- Vasily Ruksha - Amedeo Modigliani

== Reception ==
Chagall-Malevich has an approval rating of 20% on review aggregator website Rotten Tomatoes, based on 10 reviews, and an average rating of 6/10. Metacritic assigned the film a weighted average score of 53 out of 100, based on 7 critics, indicating "mixed or average reviews".
