= Master (Master and Margarita) =

- The Master and Margarita character
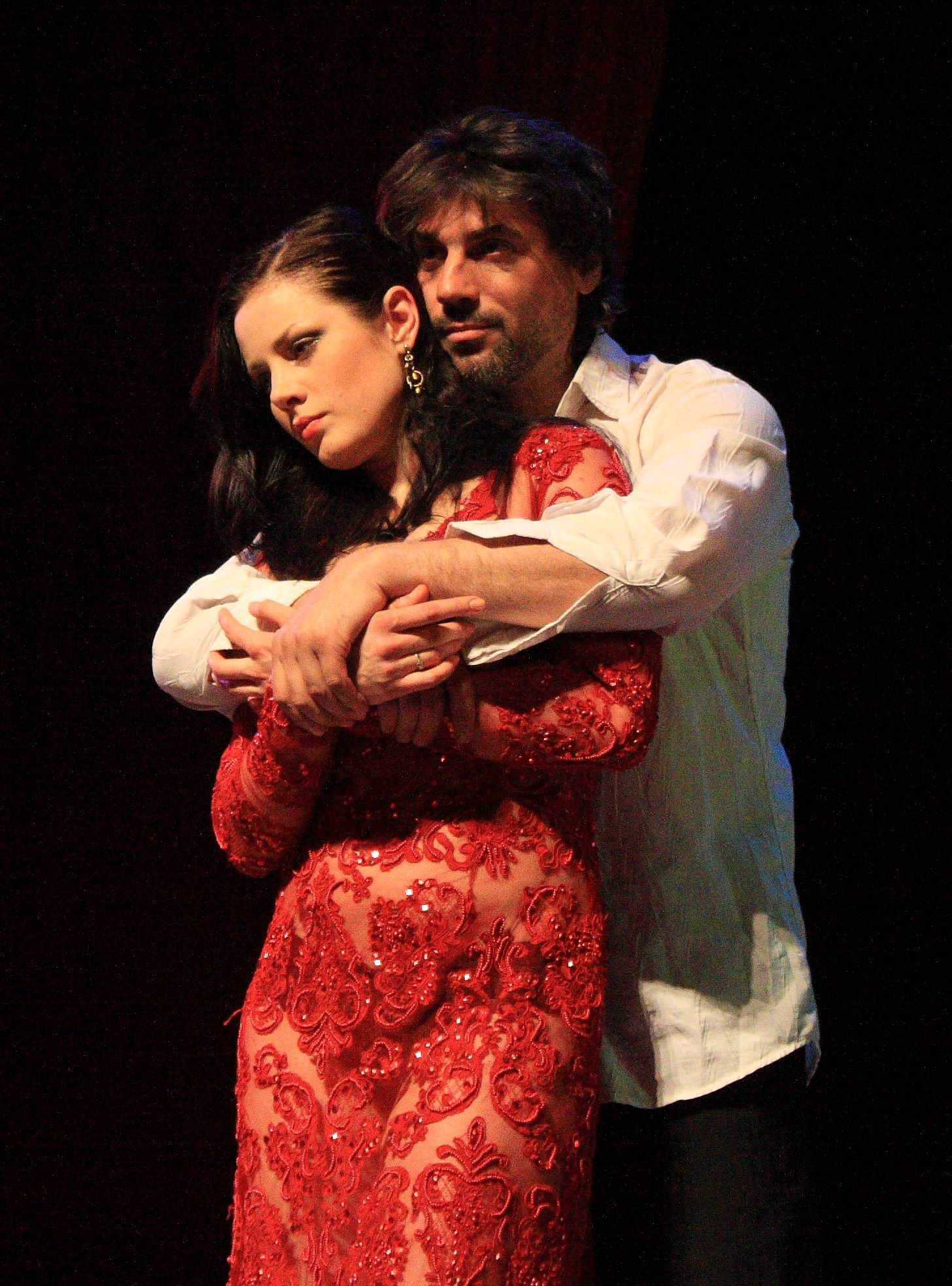
- Created by: Mikhail Bulgakov

In-universe information
- Gender: Male
- Occupation: Historian, writer
- Nationality: Russian

Master (Russian: Ма́стер) is a fictional character from the novel The Master and Margarita by the Russian writer Mikhail Bulgakov.

== Description ==
Master is a Muscovite, a former historian and a highly educated person who speaks several foreign languages.

After winning a large sum of money in the lottery he decided to fully dedicate himself to writing a novel about Pontius Pilate and the last days in life of Yeshua Ha-Nozri. His first attempt to publish it, however, caused a barrage of criticism from professional writers in the press. After a lot of harassment he gradually went mad and at the moment of despair burned his novel.

The same newspaper criticisms gave one of the Master's acquaintances, Aloiziy Mogarych, the idea to write a false report to the authorities to seize Master's apartment. After the investigation Master was freed but, having nowhere to live, no money and no purpose in life, he decided to find refuge in a mental hospital.

Woland became interested in the story of the Master's novel. He gets back the burnt manuscript and gives the Master and his beloved Margarita a place for eternal serenity and retreat.

His full name is unknown. His own answer to the question is: "I don't have a last name". In the novel his name is written without capitalizing the first letter.

In both Russian and world literature Master became the epitome of the artist, the author, who opposes the official culture of his time. In the case of Bulgakov's character, Master opposes the socialist realism.

== Prototypes ==
Most scholars find the Master character hugely autobiographical: Mikhail Bulgakov burned the first variant of his novel, and even after rewriting it, he realized that it was next to impossible to publish such an unorthodox book in the USSR.

Alfred Barkov offers an alternative interpretation of the Master character: "the ominous meaning (of the term "master") becomes evident if you realize that the System used it to define the writers who were ready to choke their ambitions and create something that it wants".

According to Barkov, one of Master's prototypes was Maxim Gorky — the most well-known proletarian writer. Barkov believes that the year of Gorky's death (1936) is the time of the events in the "Master and Margarita". However, it's not possible to date the timeline of the Moscow part of the novel.
