= Yuri Moroz (director) =

Russian film director (1956–2025)

- Юрий Мороз
- Moroz in 2017
- Born: Yuri Pavlovich Moroz; 29 September 1956; Krasnodon, Voroshilovgrad Oblast, Ukrainian SSR, USSR
- Died: 14 July 2025 (aged 68)
- Occupations: Actor; director; producer
- Years active: 1980–2024

Yuri Pavlovich Moroz (Russian: Юрий Павлович Мороз; 29 September 1956 – 14 July 2025) was a Soviet and Russian film director, actor, scriptwriter, and producer.

== Early life and career ==
Moroz's father worked as an electrician at the Zasyadko mine, and his mother was a surgeon. Year I studied in Donetsk vocational school. In 1975 he went to Moscow. In 1979 he graduated Moscow Art Theater School. He became an actor of the Lenkom Theatre. In the troupe of this theater, the actor worked until 1987.

In the cinema, Moroz made his debut in the historical two-part film of Sergei Gerasimov's 'The Youth of Peter the Great' and 'At the Beginning of Glorious Days'. In 1988, Yuri Moroz graduated from the directing department of VGIK.

His debut as a director was a fantastic film based on the novel by Kir Bulychyov 'The Witches Cave', released in 1990. In 1992 he put a detective picture of the 'Black Square, acting as a screenwriter as well.

Since 1993, since the founding, Moroz was a president of the Association of Young Cinematographers.

In 2006 he founded the film company 'Moroz Film', specializing in the production of television and full-length feature films, the first of which was the film 'The Spot' (2006). The film won the Silver hugo Award for the main female roles (Darya Moroz, Viktoriya Isakova, Anna Ukolova) at the Chicago International Film Festival. Produced the film Wolfhound.

The next stage was the filming of the television movie 'The Brothers Karamazov' (2007), where Yuri Moroz acted as producer and director of the film. In 2007, he was one of the producers of the series 'Liquidation' directed by Sergei Ursuliak.

I removed the classic detective story of Boris Akunin's best-selling book 'Pelagia and the White Bulldog'.

In 2012, Moroz, together with Dmitry Kharatyan, with the support of the Film Foundation and the Renova Foundation, began shooting a fantasy film based on the novel by Dmitry Poletayev 'Fort Ross: In Search of Adventure'.

== Personal life and death ==
Moroz was first married to Marina Levtova (1959–2000), an actress. Together they had a daughter, Darya Moroz (born 1983), herself an established theater and film actress. Moroz remarried, to Viktoriya Isakova (born 1976), an actress of theater and film.

He was also the godfather of Ivan Kharatyan, son of Dmitry Kharatyan.

Moroz died on 14 July 2025, at the age of 68. The cause of death was pancreatic cancer, which he was diagnosed in 2023.

== Selected filmography ==
Actor

- At the Beginning of Glorious Days as Alyosha Brovkin (В начале славных дел, 1980)
- The Youth of Peter the Great as Alyosha Brovkin (Юность Петра, 1980)
- The Circus Princess as Tony (Принцесса цирка, 1982)
- Boys as Kostya (Пацаны, 1983)
- Secret of the Blackbirds as Vivian Dubois (Тайна «Чёрных дроздов», 1983)
- Mary Poppins, Goodbye as Postman (Мэри Поппинс, до свидания!, 1983)
- Lermontov as Nikolai Martynov (Лермонтов, 1986)
- Visit to Minotaur as Paolo Stradivari (Визит к Минотавру, 1987)

Director

- The Witches Cave (Подземелье ведьм, 1990)
- Black Square (Чёрный квадрат, 1992)
- The Brothers Karamazov (Братья Карамазовы, 2009)
- Gold Diggers (Содержанки, 2019)

Producer

- Wolfhound (Волкодав из рода Серых Псов, 2006)
- Street Racers (Стритрейсеры, 2008)
- Once Upon a Time in the Provinces (Однажды в провинции, 2008)
- The Ghost (Домовой, 2008)
- The Brothers Karamazov (Братья Карамазовы, 2009)
