= Egor Trukhin =

Russian-Israeli actor and director

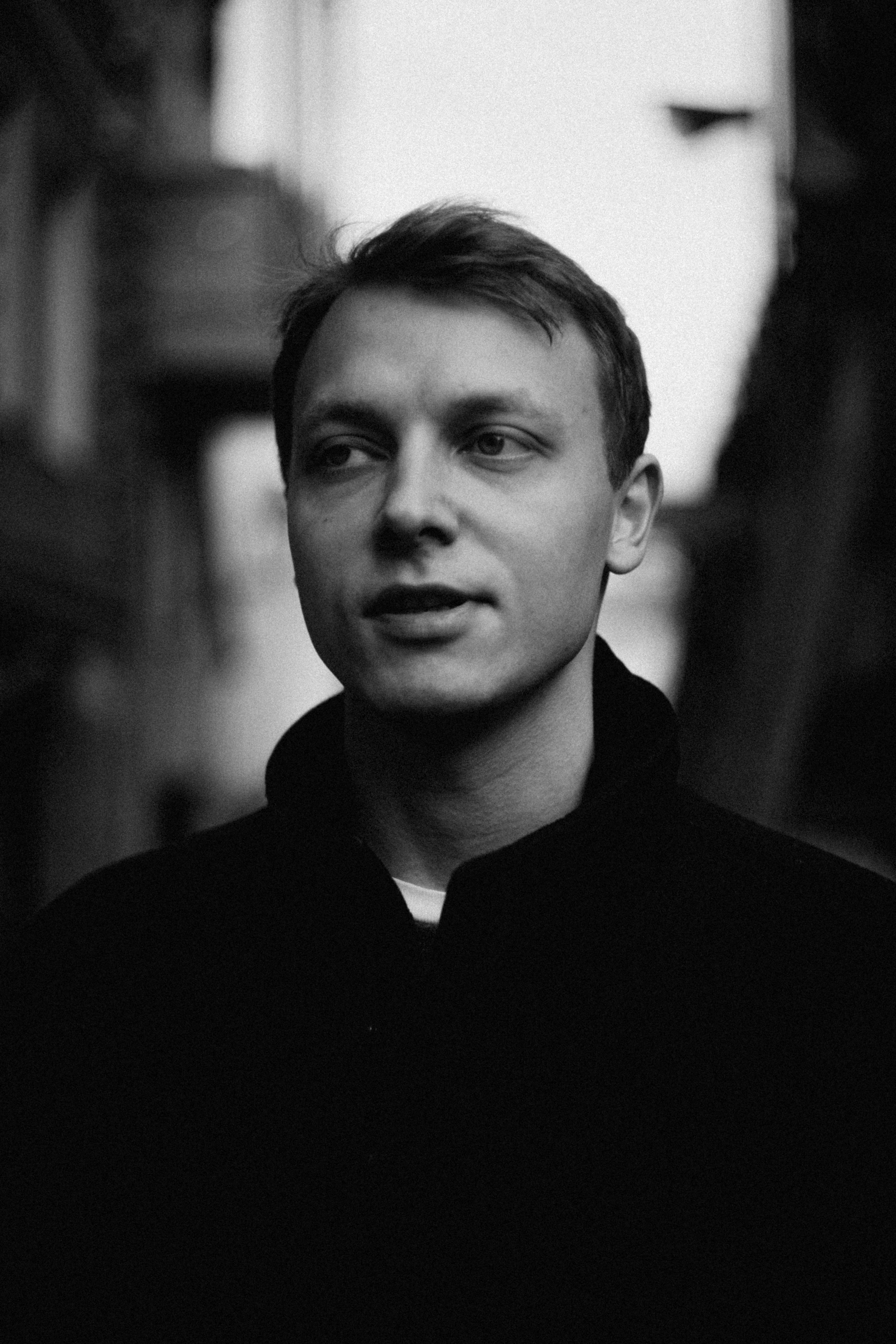
- Pronunciation: Егор Трухин
- Born: 31 January 1997 (age 29); Saint Petersburg, Russia
- Occupations: Actor; director; screenwriter

Egor Trukhin is a Russian-Israeli theater and film director, actor, screenwriter, cinematographer, and editor.

== Biography ==
Egor Trukhin was born on January 31, 1997, in St. Petersburg, Russia, into a theatrical family.

From 2009 to 2013, he attended the Theater of Youth Creativity in St. Petersburg, where he played roles in Pinocchio and Tom Sawyer. In 2013, he enrolled at the Oleg Tabakov’s Moscow Theater School. While studying there, he performed in The White Guard, directed by Sergei Zhenovach, at the Moscow Art Theater. After graduating with honors, he joined the trainee troupe of the Tabakov’s Theatre and performed in A Lively Place, directed by Vitaly Egorov.

In 2017, Egor entered the Department of Theater Directing at the Russian Institute of Theater Arts (GITIS), where he studied under Sergey Zhenovach and Yuri Butusov. During his third year, he staged Hamlet by Shakespeare, which was later presented at multiple festivals such as Your Chance, The Future of Theatrical Russia (Yaroslavl, Russia), The International Shakespeare Festival (Yerevan, Armenia), and The Tower Festival (Kaliningrad, Russia).

In 2019, he played the lead role of Vasya in the musical comedy television series The ’90s. Funny and Loud, which was broadcast on the STS channel.

In 2019, Egor made his debut as a film director with the short film In Silence, which was shot in St. Petersburg. The film, dedicated to his hometown, won "Best Experimental Film" at the MOSCOW SHORTS festival in 2021 and received recognition from other international film festivals.

In 2021, he participated in the experimental project "Laboratory of Fiction" at the Russian Academic Youth Theater (RAMT), where he presented a sketch of Waiting for Godot by Samuel Beckett.

In 2021–2022, he starred in the drama KAT directed by Boris Akopov, the drama Nika directed by Vasilisa Kuzmina, and the drama One Real Day, directed by Georgi Shengelia.

In March 2022, Egor staged Florian Zeller’s play The Mother at the Moscow Art Theater. He dedicated the work to his mother.

Later in March 2022, he left Russia in protest of the invasion policy and became a citizen of Israel. In September 2022, in Tel Aviv, he presented a self-written play I Am Here, starring actor Anatoly Beliy in the lead role. The performance toured worldwide.

In 2022-2024, Egor was touring internationally as an actor in the play My Grandson Benjamin, with Liya Akhedzhakova in the leading role.

In 2023, Trukhin appeared in the Georgian feature film Shavi Kvebi (The Black Stones), which was selected for the International Film Festival Rotterdam (IFFR).

At the beginning of 2024, Trukhin staged his self-written dramatic play So Many of You in Tbilisi, Georgia.

In 2025, Egor Trukhin founded Trukhin Ark, an independent theatre platform focused on developing original projects and international collaborations. In January 2026, Trukhin’s Six Characters, a wordless theatrical piece, was presented as a workshop at La MaMa Experimental Theatre Club in New York. In November 2026, Trukhin directed the world premiere of Matte Kranz’s Broom Play at the Steve & Marie Sgouros Theatre at The Players Theatre in New York.

== Filmography ==
=== Film ===
Year	Title	Role	Notes
2019	In Silence	Gay	Short film; also director
2022	KAT	Max	Feature Film
2022	Nika	Yasha	Feature Film
2022	One Real Day	Alyokhin	Feature film

=== Television ===
Year	Title	Role	Notes
2002	Streets of Broken Lights	—	Episode role
2007	Opera. Chronicles of the Homicide Department	—	Episode role
2017	Secretary	Stas Mirsky	TV series
2019	The ’90s. Funny and Loud	Vasya (lead role)	TV series
2019	Linden Blossom	Egor	TV series
2020	Deafblind Superhero	Jumper	TV series
