= Andrey Ilyin =

- Андрей Ильин
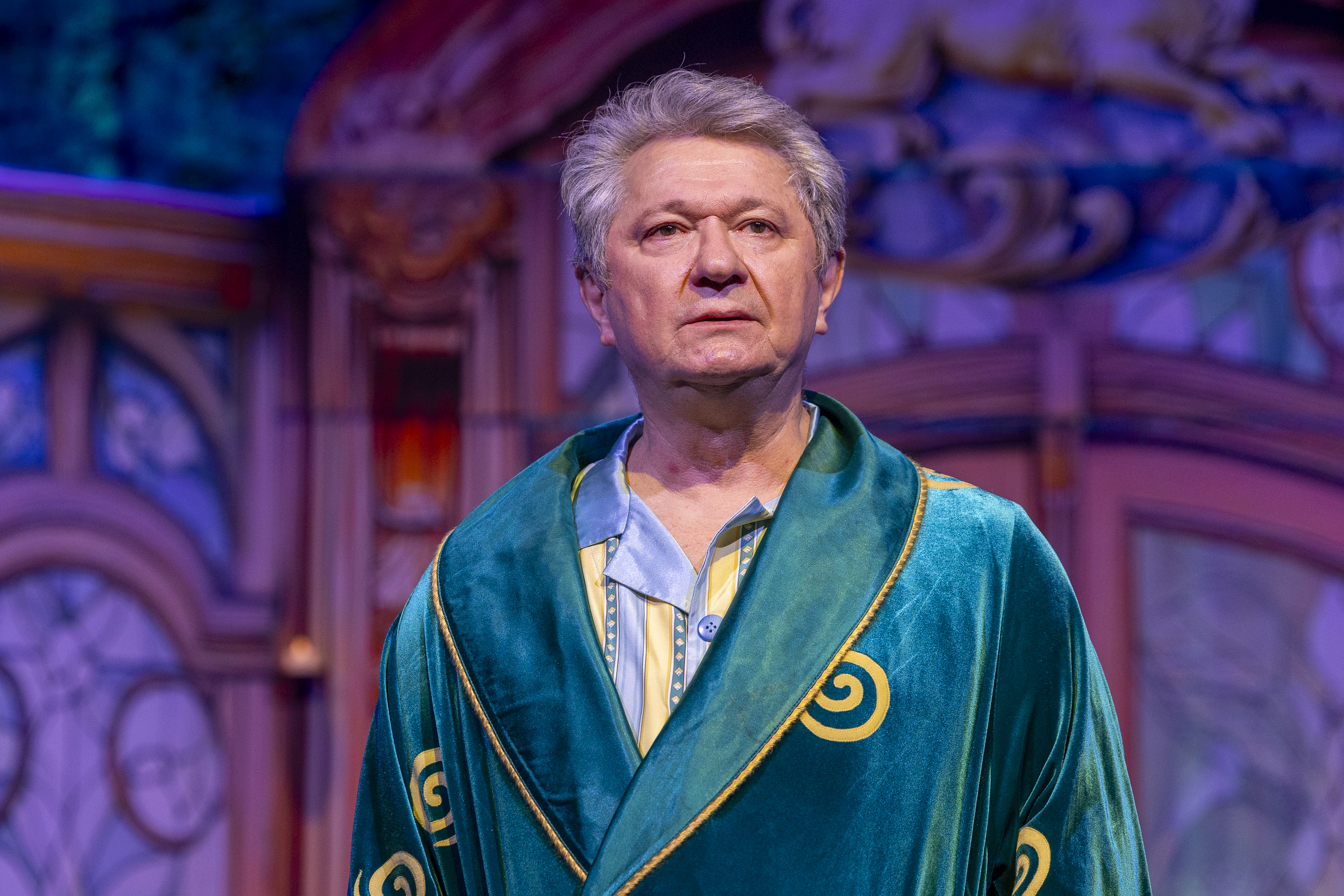
- Born: Andrey Yepifanovich Ilyin; 18 July 1960 (age 66); Nizhny Novgorod, Russian SFSR, Soviet Union
- Occupation: Actor
- Years active: 1979–present
- Website: ailyin.ru

Andrey Yepifanovich Ilyin (Russian: Андре́й Епифа́нович Ильи́н; born July 18, 1960) is a Soviet and Russian film and theater actor. Honored Artist of the Russian Federation (1993). He was awarded the Order of Friendship (2011). A member of the public organization Union of Cinematographers of the Russian Federation. People's Artist of the Russian Federation (March 29, 2021).

The actor received wide recognition after he played the role of Chistyakov, husband of Anastasia Kamenskaya (Elena Yakovleva), the title character of the series Kamenskaya.

== Personal life ==
- His first wife (1983–1992) was Lyudmila Voroshilova, assistant professor of acting at the Boris Shchukin Theatre Institute.
- Unregistered relations (1992–2000) with Aleksandra Tabakova, a Soviet and Russian actress, daughter of Oleg Tabakov.
- Second wife was Olga, swimming coach.
- Unregistered marriage (since 2010) with Inga Rutkiewicz, editor on television. Son Tikhon (born 2013).

== Selected filmography ==
- 1992 Encore, Once More Encore! as sergeant
- 1995 What a Wonderful Game as Feliks Rayevsky
- 2004 Moscow Saga (TV) as Savva Kitaygorodsky
- 2005 Adjutants of Love (TV) as Roman Mongo-Stolypin, prince
- 2006 Filipp's Bay (TV) as Ivin
- 2006 Moscow Mission as Grishin
- 2009 The Brothers Karamazov (TV) as Prosecutor Ippolit Kirillovich
- 2014 Vasilisa as Yelagin
- 2021 The Pilot. A Battle for Survival as Misha 's dad
- 2022 Zemun as Sava
