= Leonid Bichevin =

Russian actor

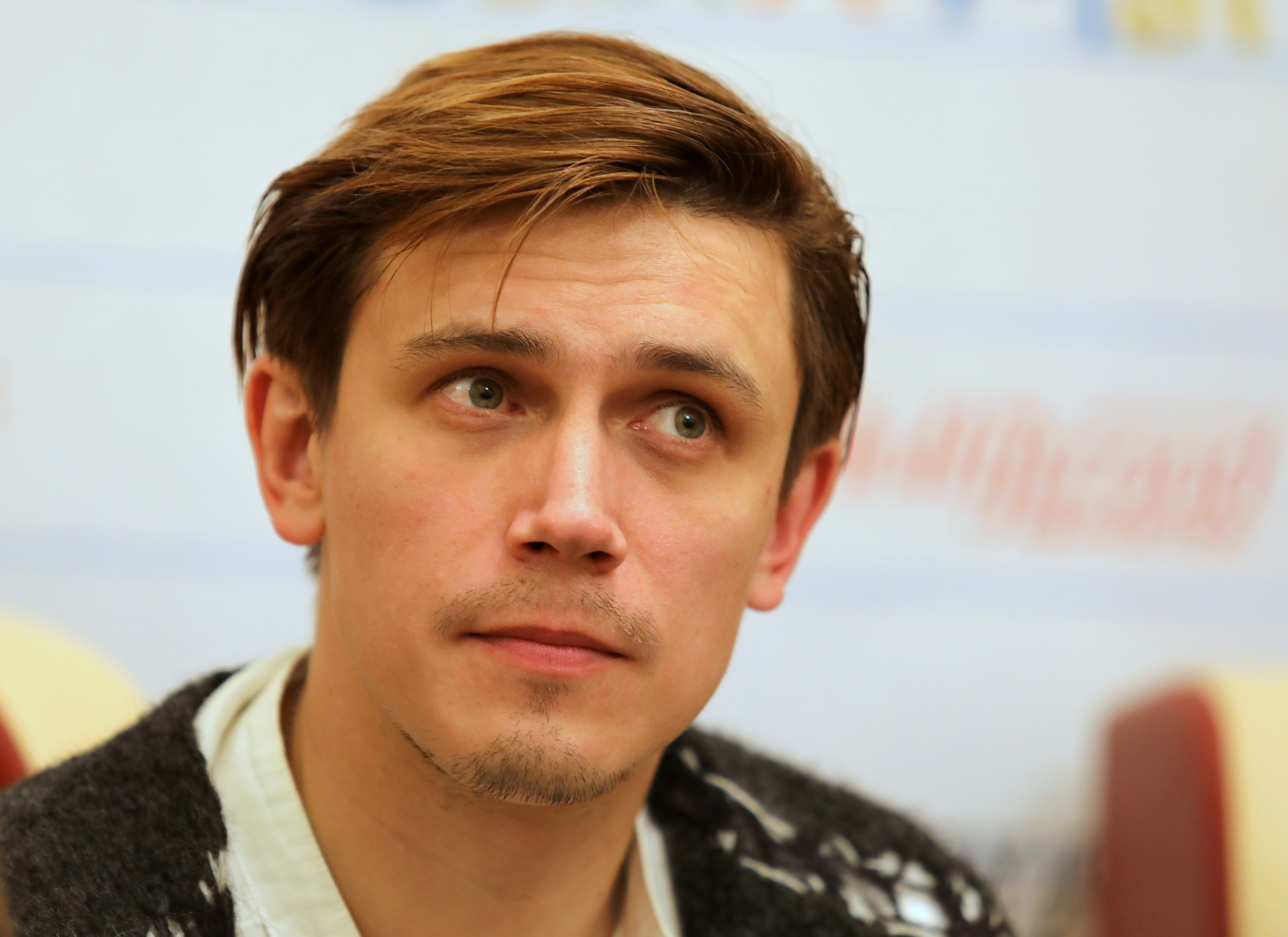
- Леонид Бичевин
- Born: Leonid Aleksandrovich Bichevin; 24 December 1984 (age 41); Klimovsk, Moscow Oblast, RSFSR, USSR
- Education: Boris Shchukin Theatre Institute
- Occupation: Actor
- Years active: 2006–present
- Spouse: Mariya Berdinskikh (2011–present)
- Children: 2

Leonid Aleksandrovich Bichevin (Russian: Леони́д Алекса́ндрович Биче́вин; born 24 December 1984) is a Russian film and theater actor.

== Early life ==
Leonid Bichevin was born in Klimovsk, Moscow Oblast, Russian SFSR, Soviet Union (now Russia). In his youth he was engaged in music and played in a band on the guitar. In addition, since his childhood, he had a horse and he was fond of horse riding. After the ninth grade of school, he decided to devote himself to breeding and raising rare breeds of horses. For this, he entered the agricultural school in Kolomna.

However, after studying there for a while, he became interested in becoming an actor.

Enrolled in the Boris Shchukin Theatre Institute, he graduated in 2006 from the course of Yuri Shlykov. Graduation theatrical performances: "Straw Hat" by E. Labish; "West Side Story" by A. Lorents; "The Theatrical Novel" by M. Bulgakov.

In 2006, right after receiving the diploma, he was admitted to the troupe of the Vakhtangov State Academic Theatre.

He collaborated with the Vilnius Theater Angelica Holina and played in the production of "Carmen" J. Bizet (director A. Kholin, the role - Don Jose).

== Career ==
He is best known for his roles in films Cargo 200 and Morphine by Alexei Balabanov. Bichevin has been a member of the Vakhtangov Theatre since 2006, and has participated in plays such as Cyrano de Bergerac, The Dog in the Manger, Troilus and Cressida, Amphitryon and Measure for Measure.

== Personal life ==
He dated his classmate at the theater institute, actress Agniya Kuznetsova. On 29 July 2011, Leonid Bichevin married actress Mariya Berdinskikh. They had a son Ivan in September 2014. At the end of 2019, they had a second son Stepan.

== Filmography ==
| Year | Title | Original Title | Role | Notes |
|---|---|---|---|---|
| 2006 | 3/2 | Три полуграции | Denis | (TV Series) |
| 2006 | More Important Than Love | Важнее, чем любовь | Vladik Egorov | |
| 2007 | The Law Teacher | Учитель в законе | Max | (TV Series) |
| 2007 | A Simple Story | Простая история | Sergei Egorov | |
| 2007 | Cargo 200 | Груз 200 | Valera | |
| 2008 | Cossasc Brigands | Казаки разбойники | Andrei | (TV Mini Series) |
| 2008 | Morphine | Морфий | Dr Mikhail Polyakov | |
| 2008 | Closed Spaces | Закрытые пространства | Venya | |
| 2008 | Once Upon a Time in the Provinces | Однажды в провинции | Che (Misha) | |
| 2008 | Borrowed Life | Жизнь взаймы | Denis Adamov | |
| 2009 | Palm Sunday | Вербное воскресенье | Gennadiy Nikitin | (TV Mini Series) |
| 2009 | Ash Waltz | Рябиновый вальс | Alexei Smirnov | Alexander Abdulov Prize for Best Actor |
| 2009 | Wild | Дикий | Rudik | (TV Series) (1 episode) |
| 2010 | Turbulence zone | Зона турбулентности | Kostia | |
| 2010 | The Law Teacher 2 | Учитель в законе 2 | Max | |
| 2010 | Decoy | Подсадной | Nikolay | |
| 2011 | Everybody Has His Own War | У каждого своя война | Victor Tolkacev (Gavroche) | (TV Mini Series) |
| 2011 | Dragon's Syndrome | Синдром дракона | Alexander Volkov | (TV Mini Series) |
| 2011 | The Group of Happiness | Группа счастья | Boris | (TV Mini Series) |
| 2011 | The Last Meeting | Последняя встреча | Ivan Shilov | (TV Mini Series) |
| 2012 | The Girl and Death | Девушка и смерть | Young Nikolai | |
| 2014 | Kuprin. In The Dark | Куприн. Впотьмах | Ivan Egorovich Alarin | |
| 2014 | Stuntman | Трюкач | Alexander Zaborsky | (TV Mini Series) |
| 2014 | Chagall — Malevich | Шагал - Малевич | Marc Chagall | |
| 2015 | Heirs | Наследники | Gleb Tregubov | |
| 2017 | Once Upon a Time We Lived | Жили-были мы | Dad | |
| 2017 | The Road to Calvary | Хождение по мукам | Ivan Telegin | (TV Mini Series) |
| 2017-2019 | The Adaptation | Адаптация | Ashton Ivy / Oleg Menshov | (TV Series, 2 seasons) |
| 2019 | Union of Salvation | Союз спасения | Sergey Muravyov-Apostol, podpolkovnik of the Chernigov Regiment revolt | Films based on Union of Salvation |
| 2019-2020 | Russian Affairs | Содержанки | Nikita Lisin | (TV Series, 2 seasons) |
| 2020 | Trigger | Триггер | Leonid Polmoranin | (TV Series) |
| 2020 | Games People Play | Безопасные связи | | |
| 2022 | Silence | Mолчание | | (TV Mini Series) |
| 2022 | Union of Salvation: Time of Wrath | Союз Спасения: Время Гнева | Sergey Muravyov-Apostol, podpolkovnik of the Chernigov Regiment revolt | (TV Series) |
| 2022 | Aeterna | Этерна | Rupert fok Felsenburg | (TV Series) |

== Theatre roles ==
| Year | Title | Original Title | Role | Original Author | Theatre |
|---|---|---|---|---|---|
| 2006 | Chasing Two Hares | За двумя зайцами | Actor | Mykhailo Starytsky | Vakhtangov Theatre |
| 2006 | Imperial Hunt | Царская охота | Bonniperti | Leonid Zorin | Vakhtangov Theatre |
| 2006 | Cyrano de Bergerac | Сирано де Бержерак | Brissaille | Edmond Rostand | Vakhtangov Theatre |
| 2006 | Frédérick or the Crime Boulevard | Фредерик, или Бульвар преступлений | Parizo | Éric-Emmanuel Schmitt | Vakhtangov Theatre |
| 2006 | Ali Baba and the Forty Thieves | Али-Баба и сорок разбойников | Warder | Vyacheslav Shalevich | Vakhtangov Theatre |
| 2006 | Dedication of Eve | Посвящение Еве | Chymera | Éric-Emmanuel Schmitt | Vakhtangov Theatre |
| 2006 | The Dog in the Manger | Собака на сене | Camilo | Lope de Vega | Vakhtangov Theatre |
| 2006 | The Dog in the Manger | Собака на сене | Leonido | Lope de Vega | Vakhtangov Theatre |
| 2007 | Deep Blue Sea | Глубокое синее море | Phil | Terence Mervyn Rattigan | Vakhtangov Theatre |
| 2008 | Locust | Белая акация | Cameraman | Isaak Dunayevsky | Vakhtangov Theatre |
| 2008 | Amphitryon | Амфитрион | Naucratès | Molière | Vakhtangov Theatre |
| 2008-2011 | Troilus and Cressida | Троил и Крессида | Troilus | William Shakespeare | Vakhtangov Theatre |
| 2010 | Measure for Measure | Мера за меру | Le Coude | William Shakespeare | Vakhtangov Theatre |
| 2010–present | Masquerade | Маскарад | Prince Zvezdich | Mikhail Lermontov | Vakhtangov Theatre |
| 2011 | The Pier (Filumena Marturano) | Пристань (Филумена Мартурано) | Michele | Eduardo De Filippo | Vakhtangov Theatre |
| 2012-2013 | Anna Karenina | Анна Каренина | Count Tyszkiewicz | Leo Tolstoy | Vakhtangov Theatre |
| 2012-2013 | Demons | Бесы | Liputin | Fyodor Dostoevsky | Vakhtangov Theatre |
| 2014-2019 | The Marriage of Figaro | Безумный день, или Женитьба Фигаро | Figaro | Pierre Beaumarchais | Vakhtangov Theatre |
| 2015 | On the strings of the rain | На струнах дождя | Alexander | Albert Kowalski | Vakhtangov Theatre |
| 2016–present | The Storm | Гроза | Boris | Alexander Ostrovsky | Vakhtangov Theatre |
| 2018–present | Eugene Onegin | Евгений Онегин | Eugene Onegin | Alexander Pushkin | Vakhtangov Theatre |
| 2019–2022 | Saturday, Sunday, Monday | Суббота, воскресенье, понедельник | Rocco | Eduardo De Filippo | Vakhtangov Theatre |
| 2020–present | The Italian Straw Hat | Соломенная шляпка | Fadinard | Eugène Labiche and Marc-Michel | Vakhtangov Theatre |
| 2020–present | Flight | Бег | Sergei Golubkov | Mikhail Bulgakov | Vakhtangov Theatre |

== Awards and nominations ==
| Year | Award | Category | Project | Result |
|---|---|---|---|---|
| 2009 | International Festival of Film Debuts | Alexander Abdulov Prize | Ash Waltz | Won |
