= Land of Legends =

- Theatrical release poster
- Directed by: Anton Megerdichev
- Written by: Sergei Bodrov; Ilya Tilkin; Kseniya Datnova; Alexei Ivanov (writer)
- Based on: Heart of Parma (ru) by Alexei Ivanov
- Produced by: Darya Lavrova; Vlad Riashyn; Igor Tolstunov; Anton Zlatopolsky; Filipp Brusnikin
- Starring: Aleksandr Kuznetsov; Yevgeny Mironov; Fyodor Bondarchuk; Elena Erbakova; Sergei Puskepalis; Aleksey Rozin
- Cinematography: Sergey Astakhov
- Music by: Igor Vdovin
- Production companies: Star Media; PROFIT (Igor Tolstunov Production Firm); Russia-1; Cinema Fund
- Distributed by: Central Partnership
- Release date: October 6, 2022 (Russia)
- Running time: 160 minutes
- Country: Russia
- Language: Russian
- Budget: ₽714.3 million
- Box office: ₽934 million

Land of Legends (Russian: Сердце Пармы, lit. 'Heart of Parma') is a 2022 Russian epic historical fantasy film directed by Anton Megerdichev. It is an adaptation of the historical novel Heart of Parma (ru) written by Alexei Ivanov and published in 2003. The book is based on the events of the 15th century and talks about the conquest of Great Perm by Moscow. The film stars Aleksandr Kuznetsov, Yevgeny Mironov, Fyodor Bondarchuk, Elena Erbakova, Sergei Puskepalis, and Aleksey Rozin joining the cast.

Principal photography began in August 2019 and ended in February 2020, the film was shot on the territory of the Perm Krai, and the Moscow Oblast were selected. Unique scenery were built on the banks of the Usva and Kosva rivers: wooden and stone cities, fortresses, stilt houses.

It was released in wide release on October 6, 2022, by Central Partnership.

== Plot ==
The film takes place in the 15th century in the Ural, which Moscow troops want to capture. Mikhail, Prince of Great Perm with the help of local residents and old gods will try to fight back.

According to the authors, the epic drama Heart of Parma is the history of the confrontation between two worlds: the Grand Duchy of Moscow and the Ural Parma, the ancient Perm lands inhabited by pagans. Here heroes and ghosts, princes and shamans, Voguls and Muscovites will clash. At the center of the conflict of civilizations is the fate of the Russian prince Mikhail, who fell in love with the young Tiche, a witch-lamia capable of taking on the form of a lynx. Passion for the pagan and fidelity to forbidden love, a campaign against the Voguls, bloody battles and a short peace, the battle between Grand Duchy of Moscow and Parma, the hero will face trials in which it is not so terrible to part with life as to commit treason.

== Cast ==
- Aleksandr Kuznetsov as Permian prince Mikhail Yermolaevich, ruler of the Grand Duchy of Great Perm.
  - Yaroslav Beloborodov as Prince Mikhail Yermolaevich as a child
- Yevgeny Mironov as bishop Jonah, the baptist.
- Fyodor Bondarchuk as Grand prince Ivan III Vasilyevich of Russia, Grand Duke of Moscow
- Elena Erbakova as Tichert (Tiche), the daughter of Permian prince Taneg of Cherdyn, lamia the sorceress, Prince Mikhail's wife
- Vitali Kishchenko as Fyodor Davydovich Pestry ("Motley"), Prince of Starodub, the Muscovite general.
- Aleksandr Gorbatov as Yermolay, Prince of Ust-Vym, Mikhail's father.
- Valentin Tszin as Asyka, a Khakan (prince) of the Vogul duchy of Pelym.
- Sergei Puskepalis as Cherdyn voivode Polyud, young Mikhail's tutor.
- Mikhail Evlanov as Danila Venets
- Vladimir Lyubimtsev as Burmot, son of Permian prince Kachaim of Iskor, voivode, Prince Mikhail's friend
- Islam Zafesov as Isur, son of Murad, shiban (voivode) of the Tatar city of Afkul, Prince Mikhail's friend
- Aleksey Rozin as bishop Pitirim
- Yelena Panova as Tabarga
- Roza Khayrullina as Aichel
- Ilya Malanin as Permian Prince Michkin of Uros
- Miroslava Mikhailova as Masha, Mikhail's daughter
- Vadim Dzyuba as Warrior in dungeon (Ratnik v temnice)

== Production ==
=== Development ===
In 2005, the rights to the film adaptation were bought by the Central Partnership company, the director of the TV series Brigada by Aleksey Sidorov, was supposed to be the director. In July 2008, it became known that the company did not intend to make the film. In 2014, Star Media Company acquired the rights to film adaptation of the novel from Alexei Ivanov. The film was originally directed by Sergei Bodrov. He later withdrew from the production due to being busy, but remained as screenwriter.

On March 21, 2019, at the pitching of the film companies leading the Cinema Foundation of Russia, producer Igor Tolstunov announced the cast of the film adaptation of Alexei Ivanov's novel Heart of Parma, which will be directed by Anton Megerdichev, responsible for the film Going Vertical (2017).

=== Filming ===
The filming took place on the territory of the Perm Krai.

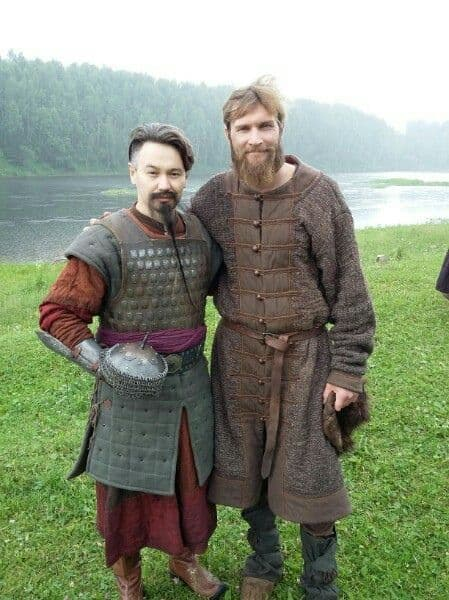
Tatar warrior and Nikolay Naumov, and an aspiring actor from Perm.

In the village of Schegolevo, Ramensky District, Moscow Oblast, and in the vicinity of Gubakha, Perm Krai, unique decorations were built on the banks of the Usva and Vishera River: wooden and stone cities, fortresses, and houses on stilts. Heart of Parma is already considered one of the most difficult staged projects of Russian cinema.

In total, more than 2,000 people took part in the project during the entire filming period, including a film crew of 150 people. The extras, recruited in the area of the town of Gubakha, where the filming took place, deliberately did not shave their beards for several months in order to appear in both the summer and winter blocks.

The costumes of the inhabitants of the fictional water city of Uros were made to order from real fish skin.

At the end of filming in Gubakha, the producers of the project decided not to disassemble the scenery, but to use the built city as a historical and tourist site. The large-scale decoration "Cherdyn" was donated to the city administration. It is planned to make an observation deck on the site of the city's scenery and install information boards with QR codes that will direct you to a site that tells about the sights of Gubakha and the filming of the project.

=== Post-production ===
The film includes large-scale battle scenes, special effects, and carefully designed costume details, props, and weapons.

=== Release ===
On August 26, 2022, the film opened the screening program of the 44th Moscow International Film Festival.

Land of Legends premiered at the "Karo 11 October" cinema in Moscow on September 28, and in Perm on October 5, 2022. It was theatrically released in the Russian Federation from October 6, 2022.
