= Elena Erbakova =

Russian actress

Elena Erbakova (Russian: Елена Ербакова; born 1996) is a Russian theatre and film actress, best known for one of the main roles in the epic drama directed by Anton Megerdichev Land of Legends (2022).

== Biography ==
Elena Erbakova was born on August 21, 1996, in village Baitog of Irkutsk Oblast. Since childhood, Elena was fond of performing arts, wrote poetry on her own and dreamed of taking part in Shakespeare's productions after school.

In 2018 she graduated from the East Siberian State Institute of Culture.

In 2017-2020 worked at the Bestuzhev State Russian Drama Theater (Ulan-Ude).

== Filmography ==
- Ulan-Ude, I love you! (2018) as Polina
- Unprincipled 2 (2021) as Tonya (TV Series)
- 6 Easy Pieces (2021) as Polina
- Land of Legends (2022) as Tiche, lamia the sorceress, Prince Mikhail's wife
- Prometheus (2024) as Elena (TV Series)

== Awards and nominations ==
Year	Association	Category	Work	Result	Ref.
2023	Golden Eagle Award	Best Leading Actress	Land of Legends	Nominated	
