= Katerina Shpitsa =

Russian actress

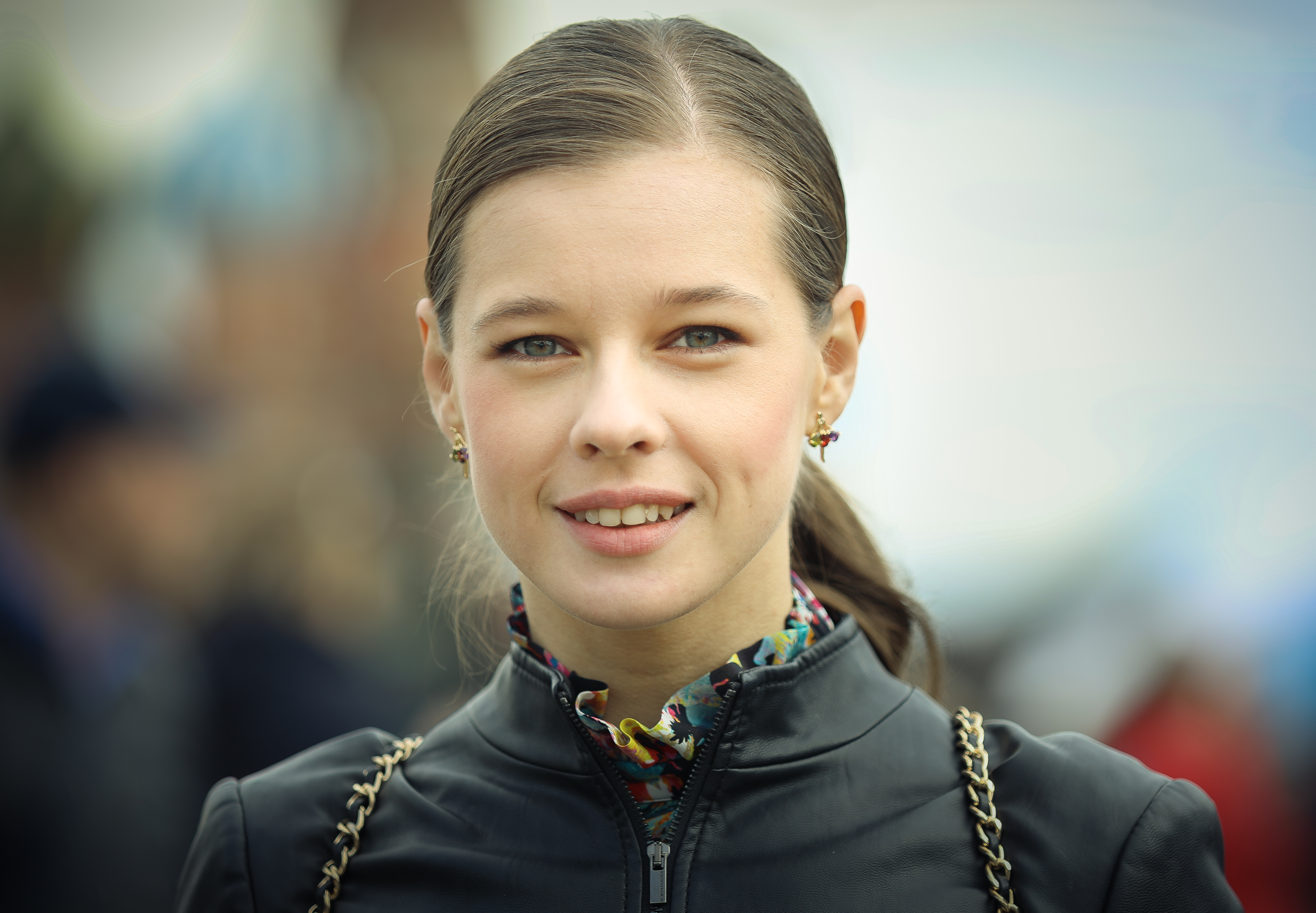
- Katerina Shpitsa in 2017
- Born: Yekaterina Anatolievna Shpitsa; 29 October 1985 (age 40); Perm, Perm Oblast, Russian SFSR, Soviet Union
- Occupation: Actress
- Years active: 2004–present
- Height: 5 ft 3 in (160 cm)
- Spouse: Konstantin Adayev (m. 2010; div. 2015)
- Children: 1
- Parent(s): Galina Shpitsa; Anatoly Shpitsa

Katerina Anatolievna Shpitsa (Russian: Катери́на Анато́льевна Шпи́ца; born 29 October 1985) is a Russian stage and film actress. She is best known for Katya: Military Story (TV series 2009) and Brothel Lights (2011).

== Biography ==
=== Early life ===
Yekaterina Shpitsa was born on 29 October 1985 in Perm, Russian SFSR, Soviet Union. Her mother Galina Shpitsa (née Karpovskaya) was a lawyer, while her father Anatoly Shpitsa was a miner.

Katerina lived in Inta, Komi Republic until she was 13 years old and studied foreign languages at an experimental French school which combined common regular subjects with arts.

=== Career ===
==== Film ====
In her youth she won a local beauty contest and also worked as a model. Later director Georgi Yungvald-Khilkevich invited her to star in his television musical Adam and Eve's Transformation, which was the beginning of her career in cinema. Katerina Shpitsa played the main role of a young, provincial Eva, who comes to conquer the capital.

Katerina was cast in the series The Circus Princess through her photo, posted on the site of the theater. The actress was invited to join the TeleFormat agency in order to pass the tests. The director of the series Alla Plotkina immediately saw in her one of the heroines, the girl-invalid Masha. The series started in January 2008 and spanned 115 episodes. And although the screen time of Katerina Shpitsa's heroine was relatively small, Masha's role became her first serious step towards fame.

In 2009, Shpitsa landed a major role in the series Katya: Military Story, with which the actress achieved wide recognition. She embodied the image of a romantic girl whose peaceful life is invaded by the war. The series lasted for two seasons.

Later, the actress played in a number of popular TV series: Advocates, Frozen Dispatches, Real Boys, Golubka, Moscow, Central District 3, Everyone has his Own War, Cedar Pierces the Sky, Rules of the Masquerade, Ahead of the Shot, Another Person's Face.

In 2011, Katerina Shpitsa appeared as the prostitute Zinka-Hitler in Alexander Gordon's Brothel Lights. And a year later she received one of the key roles (Alice) in the disaster film Metro, which brought her widespread fame.

Shpitsa played the role of the beloved of the great Russian wrestler Ivan Poddubny in the biographical film Poddubny, which was released in 2014.

In the historical series Young Guards by Leonid Plyaskin, the actress got the role of Lubov Shevtsova.

In 2016, Katerina played the role of a stewardess in the disaster film Flight Crew by Nikolai Lebedev.

==== Theatre ====
In 1998 she entered the theatre-studio CODE in Perm. She worked in the Perm Chamber Theatre New Drama.

Since 2005 she has lived in Moscow, working in the Moscow State Music Theatre of National Arts under the direction of Vladimir Nazarov.

She collaborates with the Fellowship of Free Artists.

==== Television ====
She appeared in the fourth season of ice show contest Ice Age.

== Personal life ==
In 2010 she married actor Konstantin Adayev. Their son, German, was born on 25 February 2012. In 2015 the couple divorced. She was in a brief relationship with director Maryus Vaysberg, but the couple separated in August 2015.

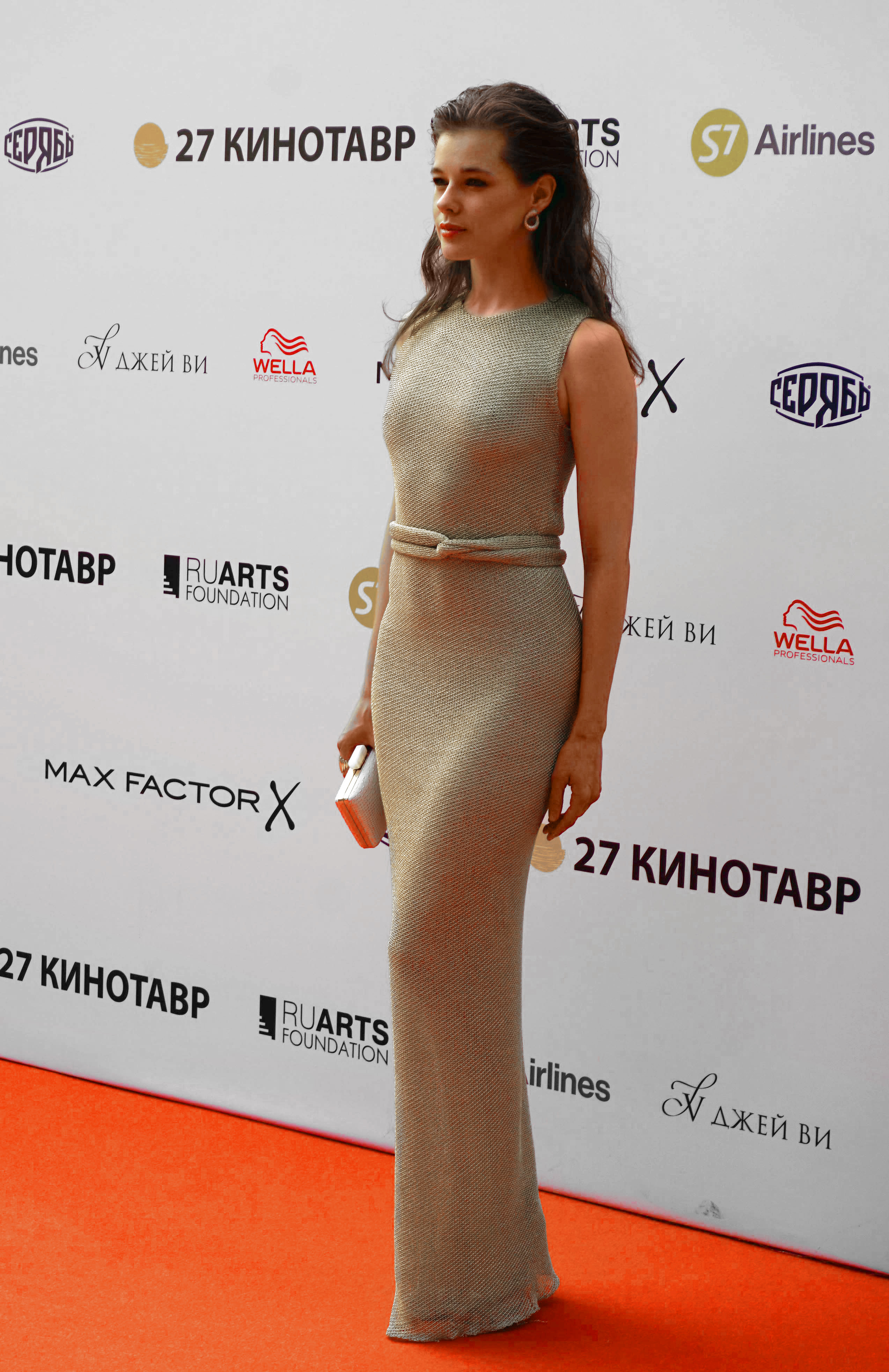
Katerina Shpitsa at the Russian Film Festival Kinotavr in Sochi, 2016

== Filmography ==
| Year | Title | Role | Notes |
|---|---|---|---|
| 2005 | Adam and Eve's transformation | Eva | TV |
| 2006 | Happy Together | Sofia | TV series |
| 2008 | The Circus Princess | Masha | TV series |
| 2008 | Blue Night | Olya | TV series |
| 2009 | Katya: Military Story | Katya Novikova | TV series |
| 2011 | Laughter in Dark | Magda | Short |
| 2011 | Brothel Lights | Zinka | |
| 2012 | Face of Another | Olga Makarova | TV series |
| 2012 | Angel Heart | Rita Proskurina | Mini-series |
| 2013 | Metro | Alisa | |
| 2013 | Real Boys | Ira | TV series |
| 2014 | Kuprin | Lyuba | TV series |
| 2014 | Iron Ivan | Maria "Masha" Dozmarova | |
| 2014 | Gift with character | Nastya Sinitcina | |
| 2014 | Funny Boys;) | Anya | |
| 2014 | Yolki 1914 | skater Ksenia | |
| 2015 | The Young Guard | Lyubov Shevtsova | TV series |
| 2015 | Bet on Love | Anna | |
| 2016 | Yolki 5 | Zhenya | |
| 2016 | Breakfast with Daddy | Yulya | |
| 2016 | Flight Crew | Vika, stewardess | |
| 2016 | What Nobody Can See | Elza | |
| 2016 | Friday | Vera | |
| 2017 | Sinbad: Pirates of the Seven Storms | Solara (voice) | Animation |
| 2017 | Graphomaniac | Ksenia | |
| 2017 | The Ark | Nino | |
| 2018 | The Crimean Bridge. Made with Love! | Varya | |
