= Aleksandr Vitberg =

- Carl Magnus Witberg
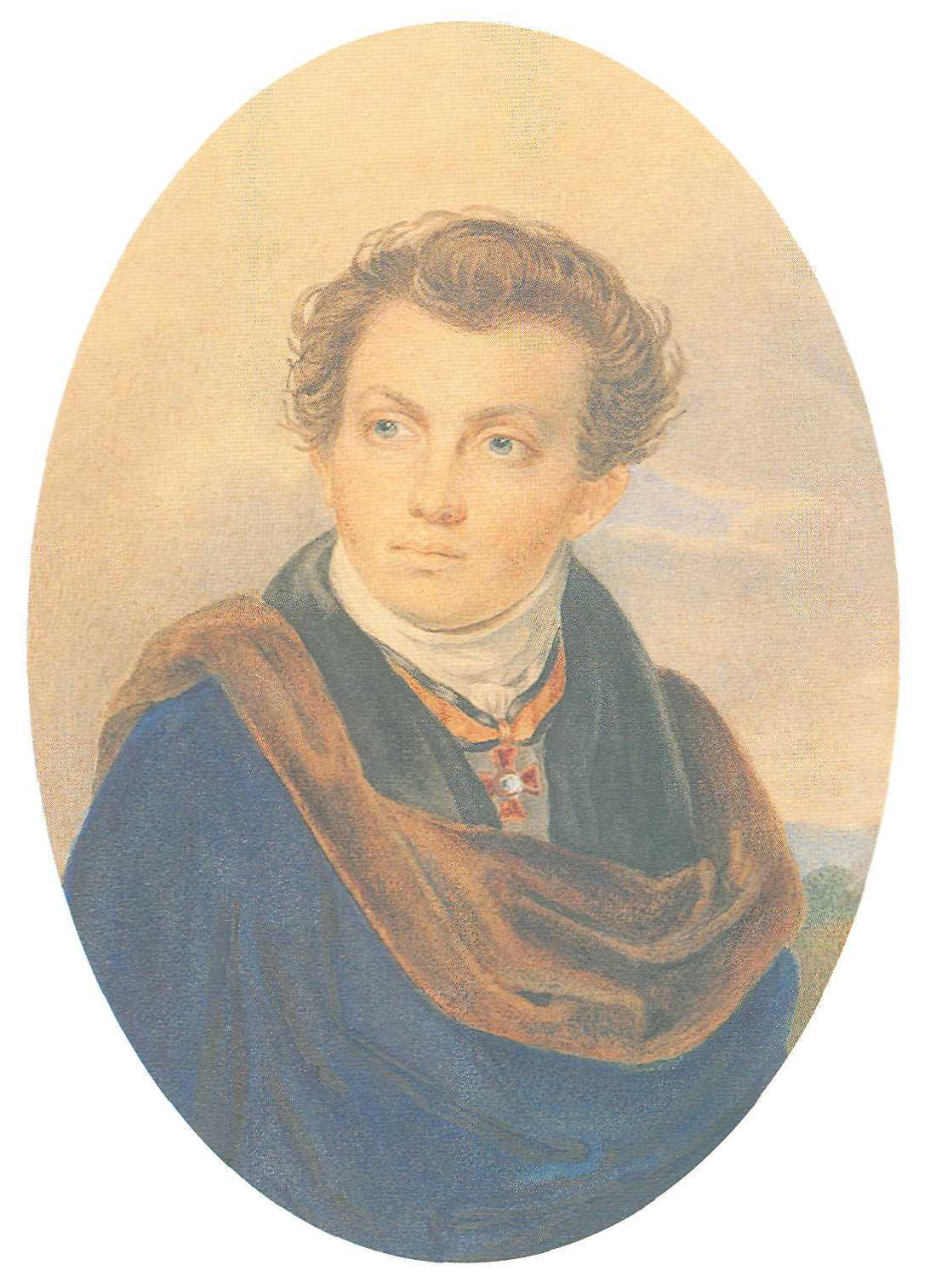
- Portrait of Vitberg — watercolor by Pyotr Sokolov
- Born: January 15, 1787; Saint Petersburg
- Died: January 12, 1855 (aged 67); Saint Petersburg
- Education: Member Academy of Arts (1812)
- Known for: Architecture, Painting
- Awards: Big Gold Medal of the Imperial Academy of Arts (1809)

Karl Magnus Vitberg (26 January 1787 – 24 January 1855) was a Russian Neoclassical architect of Swedish descent.

== Biography ==
Vitberg was born in Saint Petersburg. As a young man he was a member of Alexander Labzin's Masonic lodge, the "Dying Sphinx", and studied Boehmist theosophy. The lodge, which had been the first to reopen, in 1800, was ordered closed in 1822.

Vitberg won a design competition and in 1817 had the satisfaction of witnessing the groundbreaking ceremony for his neoclassical Cathedral of Christ the Saviour, a monument to the resistance to the French invasion of Russia in 1812. In order to undertake this project, Vitberg had converted to the Russian Orthodox Church, as stipulated by Tsar Alexander I. After his conversion, Vitberg changed his name from Karl Magnus to Aleksandr Lavrentyevich (Russian: Александр Лаврентьевич Витберг), after the monarch.

Though construction of Vitberg's cathedral on the Sparrow Hills was begun in 1826, a new emperor, Nicholas I abandoned the "Masonic" plan for a less "Roman Catholic" neo-Byzantine construction. The architect was accused of bribery and exiled to Vyatka, an isolated city halfway between Moscow and the Ural Mountains. There his most successful work was accomplished, among which were his monumental gates for the Alexander Garden (1836) and the Alexander Nevsky Cathedral (1839–1848). A fellow-exile there was Alexander Herzen, who made friends with Vitberg, portrayed him sympathetically in My Past and Thoughts, and was briefly influenced by Vitberg's strain of mystical thought.

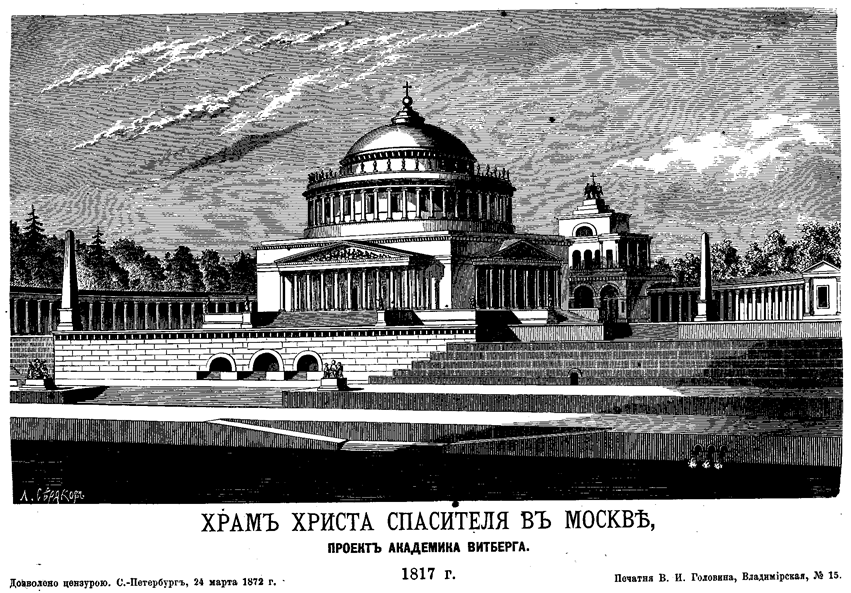
Vitberg's design for Cathedral of Christ the Saviour in Moscow.

Vitberg was eventually allowed to return to Moscow, but found little work, and died in poverty and official neglect. The Russian neoclassical revival in the late 19th century contributed to a reappraisal of his architectural legacy. An exhibition, Alexander Witberg (1787–1855). En Arkitekurhistorisk Installation was mounted in Stockholm from 1993 to 1994.
