= Brothel Lights =

- Film poster
- Directed by: Alexander Gordon
- Written by: Harry Gordon; Natalya Ryazantseva
- Produced by: Elena Yatsura; Alexey Sonck; Alexander Gryaznov
- Starring: Oksana Fandera; Ada Rogovtseva
- Cinematography: Maxim Shinkorenko
- Edited by: Dasha Danilova
- Music by: Theophil Collier
- Production companies: Mosfilm; In Motion
- Distributed by: Aurora Film; In Motion
- Release dates: June 11, 2011 (Kinotavr); November 3, 2011 (Russia)
- Running time: 112 minutes
- Country: Russia
- Language: Russian

Brothel Lights (Russian: Огни притона, romanized: Ogni pritona) is a Russian film directed by Alexander Gordon, a screen version of the same story by Harry Gordon.

The film premiered on June 11, 2011 at the Kinotavr Film Festival, with the overall release on November 3, 2011.

== Plot ==
Set in Odessa at the end of the 1950s, it is a story about an independent-minded woman who disregards the opinions of others. The main character is Lyuba, the owner of a small brothel. Working for her are two girls, Zinka and Zygota. The son of the prosecutor Arkasha is in love with Lyuba, but she loves the poet Adam.

== Production ==
Gordon shot and edited the film in 2007, but was unable to complete it until 2011 due to financial constraints.

=== Cast ===
- Oksana Fandera as Lyuba
- Alexey Levinsky as Adam
- Ada Rogovtseva as Yefrosinya Petrovna, Lyuba's mother
- Anna Slyu as Zygota
- Katerina Shpitsa as Zinka
- Christian Jereghi as Arkasha
- Bogdan Stupka as Zaslavsky, prosecutor
- Yevgeny Tsyganov as Valera
- Natalia Fisson as Zaslavsky's wife
- Mikhail Golubovich as Wilhelm

== Awards and nominations ==
Golden Eagle Award

- Best Actress (Oksana Fandera) — nominated

Nika Awards

- Best Actress (Oksana Fandera) — nominated

Pacific Meridian

- Audience Choice Award in Best Russian Film — won

Russian Guild of Film Critics Award

- Best Actress (Oksana Fandera) — nominated

Kinotavr

- Special Jury Diploma (Oksana Fandera)
