= Vadim Dzyuba =

Russian stage and film actor, poet, and activist (born 1992)

Vadim Romanovich Dzyuba
- Vadim Dzyuba
- Born: Vadim Romanovich Dzyuba; 31 March 1992 (age 34); Dolgorukovo, Lipetsk Oblast, Russia
- Occupations: Actor; poet; activist
- Years active: 2011–present
- Known for: Speech in support of political prisoners
- Awards: Best Male Role at Turgenev Theatre Moscow Festival (2019)

Vadim Romanovich Dzyuba (Russian: Вадим Романович Дзюба; born 31 March 1992) is a Russian stage and film actor, poet, and activist.

He gained public attention after his speech in support of political prisoners in the Hall of Church Councils of the Cathedral of Christ the Saviour. He is also known as a reciter of classical poetry, particularly the works of Sergei Yesenin. His one-man show "I Will Sing!" (about Yesenin's work) is popular in cultural circles. Dzyuba has been invited to perform at venues such as the House of Losev Library, the Moscow State Museum of S.A. Yesenin, the A.A. Blok Museum-Apartment, the Cathedral of Christ the Saviour, the Sergei Yesenin Museum in Voronezh, the Lipetsk State Philharmonia, and the Yesenin Central City Library in Ryazan.

== Biography ==
Dzyuba was born on 31 March 1992 in the village of Dolgorukovo, Lipetsk Oblast. He graduated from the theatre faculty of the Voronezh State Institute of Arts (under the tutelage of S.A. Nadtochiev). He also trained at the IX International Summer Theatre School of the Union of Theatre Workers of Russia (under V.M. Filštinskij). Since 2014, he has been an actor at the Voronezh Youth Theatre. From 2015 to 2023, he was an actor at the Moscow Regional Theatre for Young Spectators.

In December 2019, Dzyuba became a laureate in the "Best Male Role" category at the Turgenev Theatre Moscow festival for his portrayal of Volodya in the play "First Love" (directed by Nikolai Druchek). The festival was organized by the Turgenev Library-Reading Room and the Turgenev Society. The jury consisted of 13 literary scholars, journalists, and representatives of Turgenev societies.

In November 2021, he performed his one-man show "I Will Sing!" on the stage of the Lipetsk State Philharmonia, accompanied by the Lipetsk State Orchestra of Russian Folk Instruments.

On the evening of 26 February 2022, Dzyuba was detained in Moscow on Pushkin Square during protests against the Russian invasion of Ukraine. According to the Russian human rights media project OVD-Info and Teatr magazine, The actor was standing on the street recording a poem. The Savelovsky District Court fined him 20,000 rubles. An anti-war poster that the actor did not have was attached to the case file.

In August 2022, he compiled his poems written after the start of the Russian invasion of Ukraine into a cycle titled "Poems Against".

In November 2022 and 2024, he performed at the Hall of Church Councils of the Cathedral of Christ the Saviour as part of concerts dedicated to the work of Sergei Yesenin. During these performances, he also read anti-war excerpts from the poem "Anna Snegina".

On 26 November 2025, at the Cathedral of Christ the Saviour during a concert marking the 130th anniversary of Sergei Yesenin, Dzyuba delivered a speech in support of political prisoners. The video recording of this speech received wide international resonance in global media outlets such as NPR, the BBC Russian Service, La Croix, France 24, Avvenire, TV Rain, Current Time, Radio Free Europe/Radio Liberty, The Insider, Echo of Moscow and others.

In March 2026, Dzyuba was featured as one of the subjects of the documentary report "We Are All Tired": How Russians Continue to Help Despite Threats and Pressure, published on the YouTube channel of TV Rain.

On April 7, 2026, an episode of the NPR podcast "State of the World" featuring Vadim Dzyuba was released.

On July 9, 2026, the federal Russian state news channel Russia-24 broadcast a news segment that criticized Vadim Dzyuba's anti-war poetry, along with his professional activities and public position.

In August 2026, international media outlets such as Current Time, Radio Voice of Berlin, Govorit NeMoskvа, Activatica and others reported on Dzyuba's poetic resistance.

=== Political position ===
In January 2023, he published an appeal on social media in support of Alexei Navalny.

In April 2023, he signed an open letter in support of Vladimir Kara-Murza.

In May 2023, he signed an open letter in support of Zhenya Berkovich and Svetlana Petriychuk.

== Theatre ==
Moscow Regional Theatre for Young Spectators

- 2015 – "Teremok" by Samuil Marshak (dir. Mikhail Shelukhin) – Wolf
- 2015 – "Lady Perfection" by P. L. Travers (dir. Mikhail Borisov) – Porter
- 2016 – "First Love" by Ivan Turgenev (dir. Nikolai Druchek) – Volodya
- 2016 – "The Nutcracker" by E. T. A. Hoffmann (dir. Vera Annenkova) – Harlequin
- 2016 – "The Little Soldier" by Hans Christian Andersen (dir. Juliana Laikova)
- 2016 – "Umka" by Y. Yakovlev (dir. Natalya Lebedeva)
- 2017 – "Cinderella" by Evgeny Schwartz (dir. Andrey Gorbaty) – Prince
- 2017 – "The Important Bird" by Y. Starodub (dir. Igor Afanasyev) – Guard
- 2019 – "Peter Pan" by J. M. Barrie (dir. Alexey Fran detti) – Crocodile
- 2020 – "Fairy Tales Just in Case" by E. Klyuev (dir. Arkady Cherkashin)

People's Museum of Sergei Yesenin

- 2014 – "I Will Sing!" by Sergei Yesenin (dir. Vadim Dzyuba)
- 2015 – "Chekhov. Monologues" by Anton Chekhov (dir. Vadim Dzyuba)

IX International Theatre School of the Union of Theatre Workers of Russia

- 2015 – "Mortido. Rainbow of Convulsions" (dir. Maxim Didenko and Yuri Kvyatkovsky)

== Filmography ==
Year	Title	Role	Notes
2014	Icorny Baron	Cossack	TV series
2015	The Eighties (Восьмидесятые)	Student	TV series
2015	Ivan and Grief	Ivan	Short film
2018	Volnaya Gramota (Вольная грамота)	Antosha	TV series
2019	Bezsonov (Безсонов)	Clergyman	TV series
2019	Detki (Dетки)	Serzhantik	TV series
2021	Reversible Reality (Обратимая реальность)	Guy on the Rope	
2022	Land of Legends (Сердце пармы)	Warrior in Dungeon (Ratnik v temnice)	
2022	Beneath the Unkind Sky (Под неласковым небом)	Valka Rykov	TV series
2025	This is a Clinic (Это клиника)	Policeman	TV series

== Awards and achievements ==
- 2016 – Diploma of the VII International Chekhov Reader Competition
- 2019 – "Best Male Role" prize at the Turgenev Theatre Moscow festival for his lead role in "First Love", directed by Nikolai Druchek, Moscow Regional Theatre for Young Spectators
