= Ekaterina Gordon =

Russian TV presenter, musician and lawyer

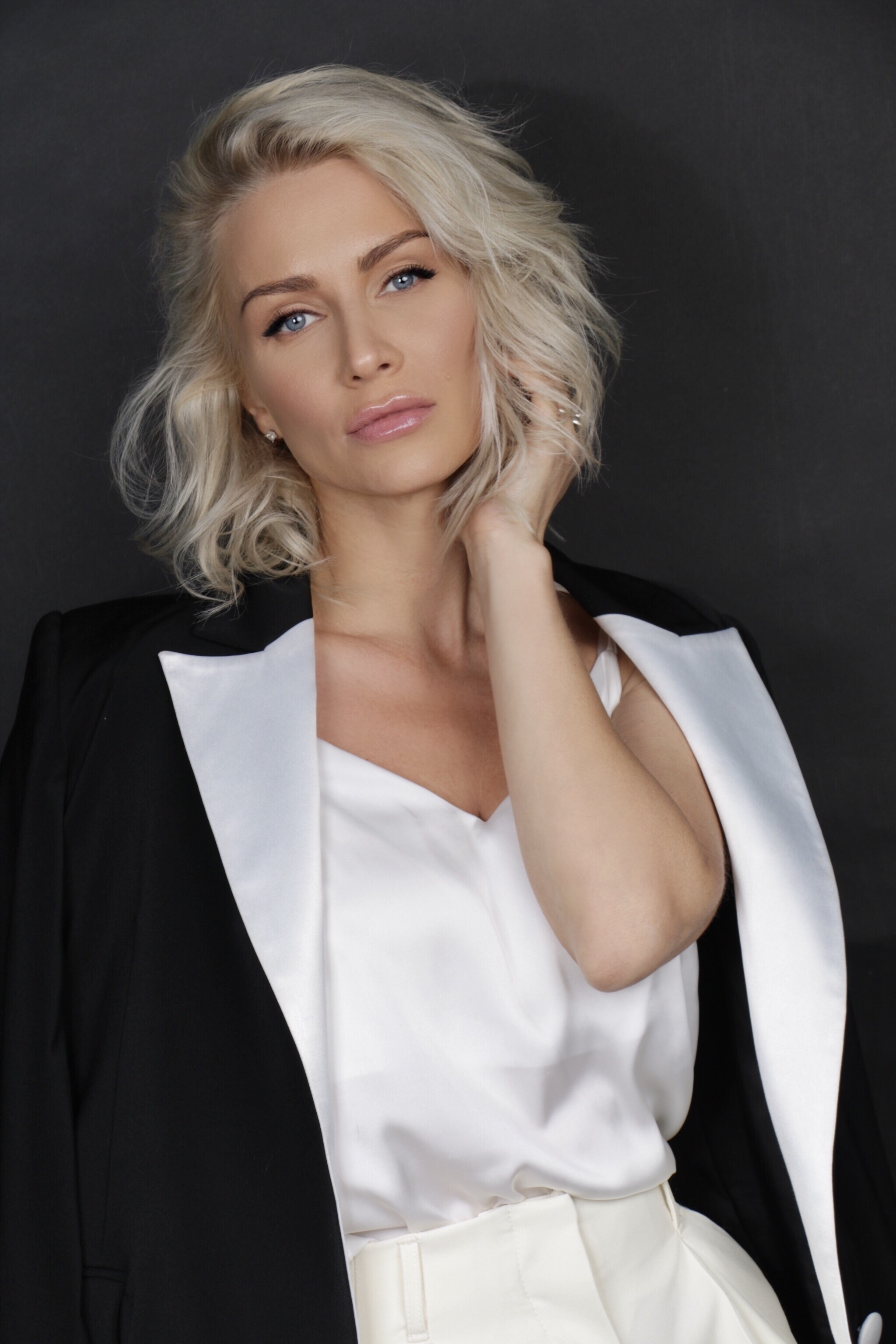
- Born: 19 October 1980 (age 45); Moscow, RSFSR, USSR
- Occupations: TV presenter, radio presenter, actress, musician

Ekaterina Viktorovna Gordon (née Prokofieva; born 19 October 1980) is a Russian TV and radio presenter, musician, actress and public figure.

== Biography ==
Ekaterina Viktorovna Gordon (née Prokofieva) was born in Moscow on October 19, 1980. She combined her studies in the Humanitarian Gymnasium with studies in the Economic School for High School Students at the International University.

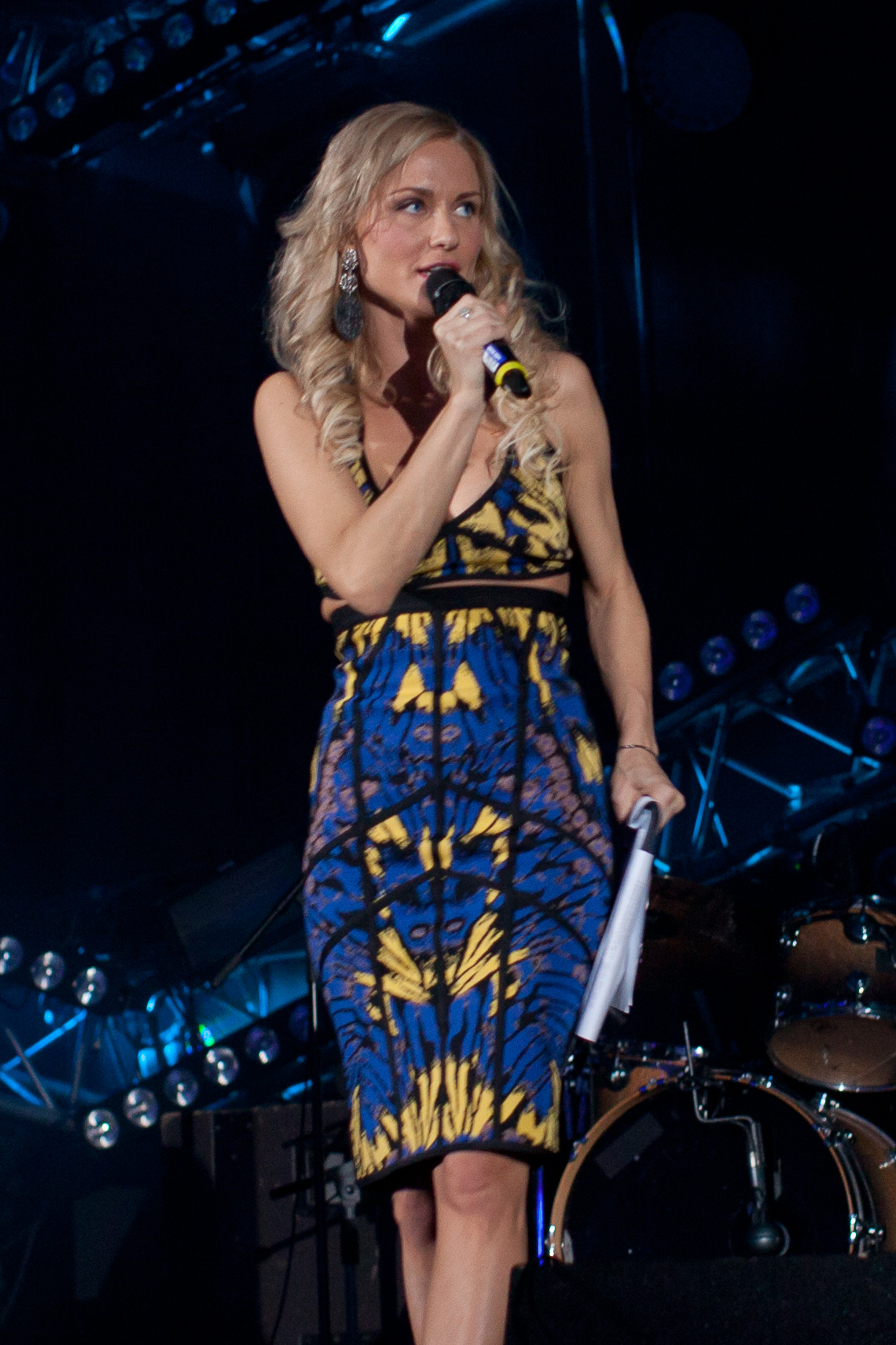
Ekaterina Gordon at the concert 20 years of Runet, April 7, 2014.

In 2002, she graduated from the Faculty of Social Psychology of the Moscow State Pedagogical University. Then she entered the Higher Courses of Screenwriters and Directors in the studio by Pyotr Todorovsky. She later pursued legal studies at the Moscow State Law Academy.

Gordon began her media career as a television presenter on M1 (“Gloomy Morning”) alongside her first husband, journalist Alexander Gordon (2000–2006). She went on to host programs on O2TV, Channel One Russia, Zvezda, TV Center, and Channel One, including shows like “City Slickers,” “The Other Side of the Legend,” “Vremechko,” “PROreading,” and “Selfie.” She was also a radio presenter at Mayak, Echo of Moscow, Govorit Moskva, and other stations.

In 2007–2008, she co-hosted the radio program “Cult of Personality” on Radio Mayak with writer Dmitry Glukhovsky, a show noted for an on-air dispute with TV presenter Ksenia Sobchak.

The group released the albums Ljubow i Swoboda (2010) and Nadojelo bojatsja (2012). She later released solo works including Nichego lishnego (2012) and Sex & Drama (2016), having written over 200 songs, some performed by Ani Lorak, Grigory Leps, Dmitry Koldun, and others.

She wrote and directed the short film More volnujetsja raz (2005), directed music videos and commercials, and acted in productions such as Pikap: Sem bez pravil (2009) and Photographer (2008). Her literary works include the book Kontschenyje (2006) and the poetry collection СТИХИКАТИГОРДОН (2015).

In 2013, she founded the family law firm Saferoom, later renamed Gordon and Sons, specializing in women’s and children’s rights. She actively participated in civil movements since 2009, joining Strategy‑31 protests and environmental campaigns like the defense of Khimki Forest. She also founded the NGO Nenuschnaja poroda to support stray animals and organized the RockSobaka festival.

== Personal life ==
In 2000–2006, she was married to the journalist Alexander Gordon.

In 2011 and 2013, she married lawyer Sergei Zhorin twice. Both marriages ended in divorce. She has two sons: Daniel (born in 2012) and Seraphim (born in 2017).

== Political views and activism ==
Since 2009, Gordon has engaged in political and social activism, advocating for parliamentary reform and women’s rights in Russia.

In October 2017, she announced her independent candidacy for the 2018 Russian presidential election, aiming to collect 300,000 signatures without party affiliation.

Gordon has also remained active as a commentator on Russian politics and social issues. In 2023, she appeared in international media interviews discussing press freedom, government repression, and the importance of civil society in Russia.

== Awards and recognition ==
Gordon has been recognized for her contributions to the Russian music scene, having won two Golden Gramophone Awards for songs she authored.
