= Iron Ivan =

- Film poster
- Russian: Поддубный
- Directed by: Gleb Orlov
- Written by: Yuriy Korotkov
- Produced by: Leonid Vereshchagin; Vadim Goryainov; Leonid Lebedev; Nikita Mikhalkov; Valery Todorovsky
- Starring: Mikhail Porechenkov; Katerina Shpitsa; Aleksandr Mikhailov; Roman Madyanov; Vladimir Ilyin; Yuri Kolokolnikov; Denis Lavant
- Cinematography: Vladislav Opelyants
- Edited by: Mariya Likhachyova
- Music by: Yuriy Poteenko
- Production companies: Studio TriTe; Red Arrow; Russia-1; Cinema Fund
- Release date: 2014
- Running time: 120 minutes
- Country: Russia
- Language: Russian
- Budget: $12 million

Iron Ivan (Russian: Поддубный, lit. 'Poddubny') is a 2014 Russian biographical sports drama film directed by Gleb Orlov. The plot of the film in many ways repeats the Soviet film The Wrestler and the Clown.

== Plot ==
The film tells about the fighter Ivan Poddubny, who could defeat any opponent in the ring, but lost to love.

== Cast ==
- Mikhail Porechenkov as Ivan Poddubny
- Katerina Shpitsa as Maria "Masha" Dozmarova, a gymnast, Ivan Poddubny's beloved
- Aleksandr Mikhailov as Maxim Ivanovich Poddubny, Ivan Poddubny's Father
- Roman Madyanov as Tverdokhlebov, Circus Director
- Vladimir Ilyin as Drubich, Poddubny's Manager
- Yuri Kolokolnikov as Count Korsakov, Poddubny's Manager
- Denis Lavant as Eugene de Paris, Poddubny's Coach
- Mikhail Krylov as Terry Covel, Poddubny's Manager in the USA
- Pyotr Krylov as Nikita Poddubny, Ivan Poddubny's brother
- Andrey Smolka as Mitrofan Poddubny, Ivan Poddubny's brother
- Harry Anichkin as Chief Judge
- Nina Antonova as Nurse
- Velizar Binev as American Neighbour
- Terry Bird as Scott

== Production ==
=== Filming ===
Funds for location shooting of the film were provided in the summer of 2012 by the Cinema Foundation and took place in Sevastopol, Moscow, Paris and New York.
