= Alexei Ivanov (writer) =

Russian writer (born 1969)

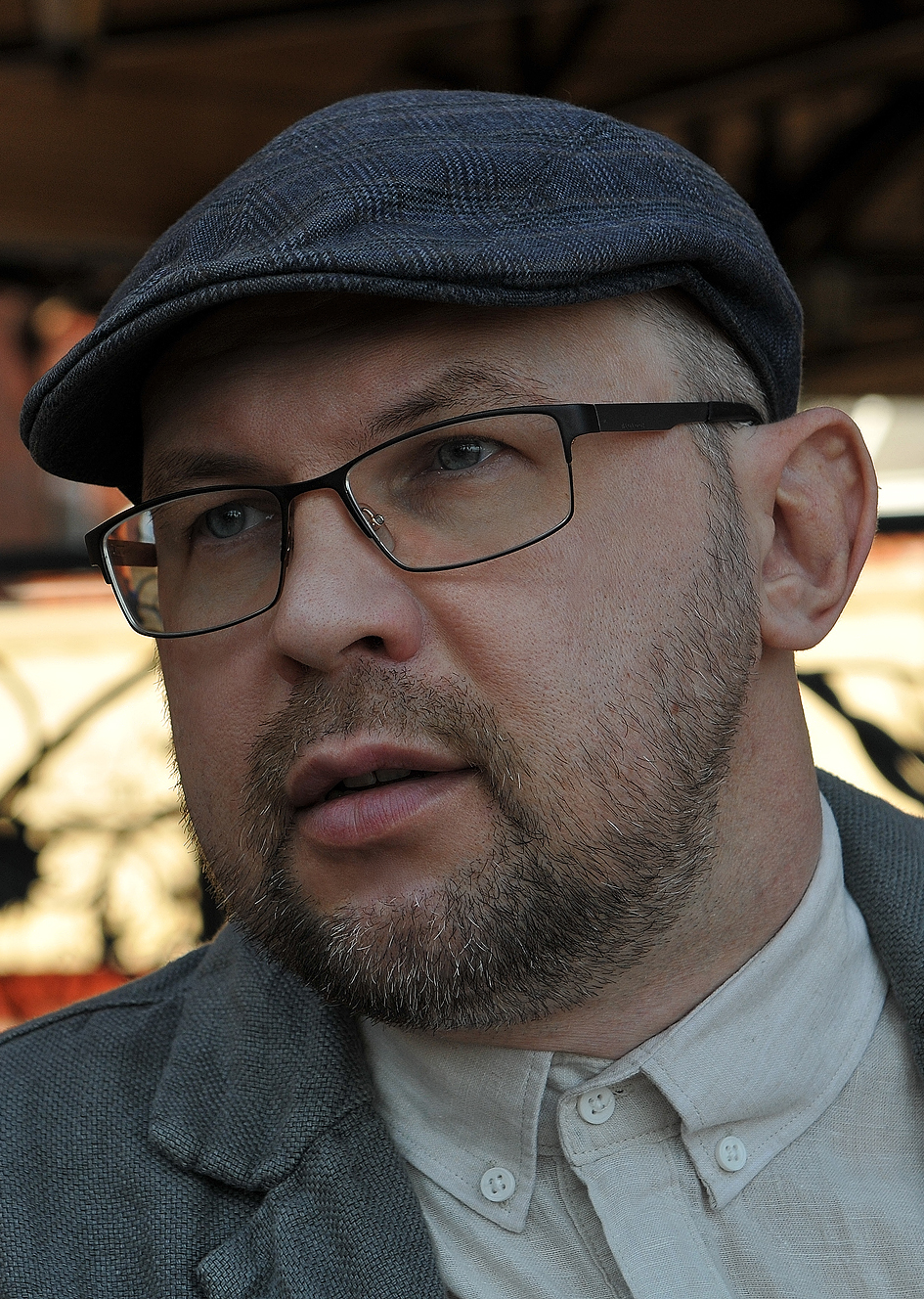
- Born: November 23, 1969 (age 56); Gorky, USSR
- Writing career
- Genre: Fiction
- Notable works: The Heart of Parma; The Geographer Drank His Globe Away; Tobol

Alexei Viktorovich Ivanov (Russian: Алексе́й Ви́кторович Ивано́в; born November 23, 1969) is a Russian award-winning writer.

== Biography ==
=== Early years and first works ===
Ivanov was born in Nizhny Novgorod into a family of shipbuilding engineers. In 1971 the family moved to Perm, where he grew up. In 1987, he entered Ural State University as a journalism student. He left college after a year, returning in 1990 to study art and culturology. An assignment from a workplace was required to enroll, later Ivanov confessed that he forged a paper, proving that he worked in a museum. Ivanov graduated in 1996.

His first publication was a science-fiction story called "Hunt for the Great Bear," published in 1990 in the magazine Uralsky sledopyt with 500,000 circulation. After returning to Perm, Ivanov worked as a guard, schoolteacher, university teacher, and tourist guide; the latter occupation brought him to study local history, which he later explored in his writing. However, for thirteen years Ivanov wrote "for the drawer", without publishing.

=== Career ===
He first became known for his 2003 novel Serdtse Parmy (The Heart of Parma). The novel, set in Great Perm in the 15th century, included real historical figures such as knyaz Mikhail Ermolaevich and his son Matvey Mikhailovich, their enemy Mansi knyaz Asyka, Muscovite Fyodor Pestriy, as well as pagan magic, battle elk, witches, and adventures. The story unfolded in the times when Christian Moscow forcibly united distant, often pagan lands and forged them into a united state. Russian writer Leonid Yuzefovich helped Ivanov to get his first contracts with Vagrius and Palmira publishing houses and publish the book. Very soon it became a bestseller, received numerous accolades and even made a start to the ethno-futuristic festival of the same name. Influence and popularity of the novel grew so big that some peers state that Ivanov no less than ‘reinvented Perm’.

A great admirer of Ivanov's prose, Russian critic Lev Danilkin says that it takes a great deal of courage to enter the world of Russian literature with such a common surname as Ivanov's. In 2009, Ivanov began working with literary producer Yuliya Zaytseva. Together, they founded the production center July and hired accounting, legal, and technical teams. According to Zaytseva, the center enabled Ivanov to undertake more ambitious artistic and social projects. Beginning in 2010, they organized expeditions to remote villages in the Perm region for each of his books to conduct ethnographic research related to their stories.

In 2009 Ivanov co-wrote the screenplay for Pavel Lungin's film Tsar.

The screenplay ‘Tobol’, written by Ivanov, was significantly altered by the movie's director and as a result the writer refused to be named one of the co-authors. The picture's titles only had the line ‘based on Alexey Ivanov's novel’.

In 2021 in Kaliningrad Ivanov presented his new book ‘Shadows of Teutons’.

=== Social activities and art projects ===
While working on the novel ‘Serdtse Parmy’, Ivanov established a local museum of regional studies for children. The items for its collection were picked during the expeditions that Ivanov organized for his students. Some of the experience as a tutor for ‘troubled’ teenagers was later reflected in Ivanov's award-winning novel ‘The Geographer Drank His Globe Away’. However, after several years of successful work the museum was closed by the local authorities, nowadays there is a billiard center in its former building.

Ivanov also worked on various projects aiming to create a better image of Perm, add fresh air into its cultural life, pay tribute to its long and colorful history. In 2009 with journalist Leonid Parfenov Ivanov made a movie ‘The Backbone of Russia: Perm’.

In the early 2010s Ivanov initiated a series of editions ‘Perm as Text’ that included works of many writers from Eastern Europe. However, the local Perm authorities, as described by Ivanov himself, gave him money for the series with one hand and stole budgets with the other. The project eventually died. In 2013 he publicly named Perm authorities ‘crooks and boors’.

In 2014 Ivanov co-authored an art album ‘Ekaterinburg: Multiply by Million’ with artist Valery Shtukaturov. One thousand copies were printed, mostly sponsored by private donors, and were distributed as gifts. Ivanov waived his fee.

Ivanov openly opposed Marat Gelman and his cultural project ‘PERMM’ in the region, because according to Ivanov they neglected and ignored Perm's unique identity and heritage and tried to make a ‘second Winzavod’ there. The writer found it offensive that the authorities granted Gelman's museum of contemporary art 90 mln roubles and in the meantime gave only 30 mln to the Perm Art Gallery. In culmination of the scandal, Ivanov even refused his Stroganoff Award and moved to live in Ekaterinburg.

Ivanov first travelled abroad in 2012, to Prague. As of 2019, the writer lives in emigration.

== Bibliography ==
=== Novels ===
- 1992 — Dormitory-on-Blood (‘Общага-на-Крови’);
- 2003 — The Heart of Parma, or Cherdyn, The Queen of Mountains (‘Сердце Пармы, или Чердынь — княгиня гор’), adapted into a movie Land of Legends;
- 2003 — The Geographer Drank His Globe Away (‘Географ глобус пропил’), adapted into a movie of the same name;
- 2005 — Gold of the Rebellion, or Down the River of the Gorges (‘Золото бунта, или Вниз по реке теснин’);
- 2007 — Bluda i MUDO (‘Блуда и МУДО’);
- 2009 — The calendar according to John (‘Летоисчисление от Иоанна’);
- 2011 — Dogheads (‘Псоглавцы’);
- 2012 — Community (‘Комьюнити’);
- 2015 — Bad Weather (‘Ненастье’);
- 2017 — Tobol (‘Тобол’);
- 2018 — The Food Block (‘Пищеблок’), English translation by Richard Coombes, 2024;
- 2020 — To Be Alexey Ivanov (‘Быть Алексеем Ивановым’);
- 2021 — Shadows of the Teutons (‘Тени тевтонов’);
- 2023 — Armored steamships (‘Бронепароходы’);
- 2024 — Vegetation (‘Вегетация’);
- 2025 — Nevyansk Tower (‘Невьянская башня’).

=== Screenplays ===
- Tsar (2009), screened in the Un Certain Regard section of the 2009 Cannes Film Festival.

=== Film adaptations ===
- The Geographer Drank His Globe Away (2013), directed by Alexander Veledinsky; won multiple awards including Best Film at the Nika Awards.

== Awards ==
Ivanov was awarded the Mamin-Sibiryak Prize in 2003; the Eureka, Start, and Bazhov prizes in 2004; and the Book of the Year and Portal prizes in 2006. He has been nominated three times for the National Bestseller prize.

- Stroganoff Award, 2006. The accolade is given for significant contribution to the Perm region, its development and culture. Ivanov refused the award in 2009 and donated all the money to the Perm Stroganoff museum.
- ‘Book of the Year’ for ‘Nenastye’, 2016.

== Sources ==
Zyrianov, A. I. (2017). "Globus, Parma and Tobol". Geography Reporter (in Russian). 3 (42): 43–47.
