= Cathedral of Christ the Saviour =

- Храм Христа Спасителя; Khram Khrista Spasitelya
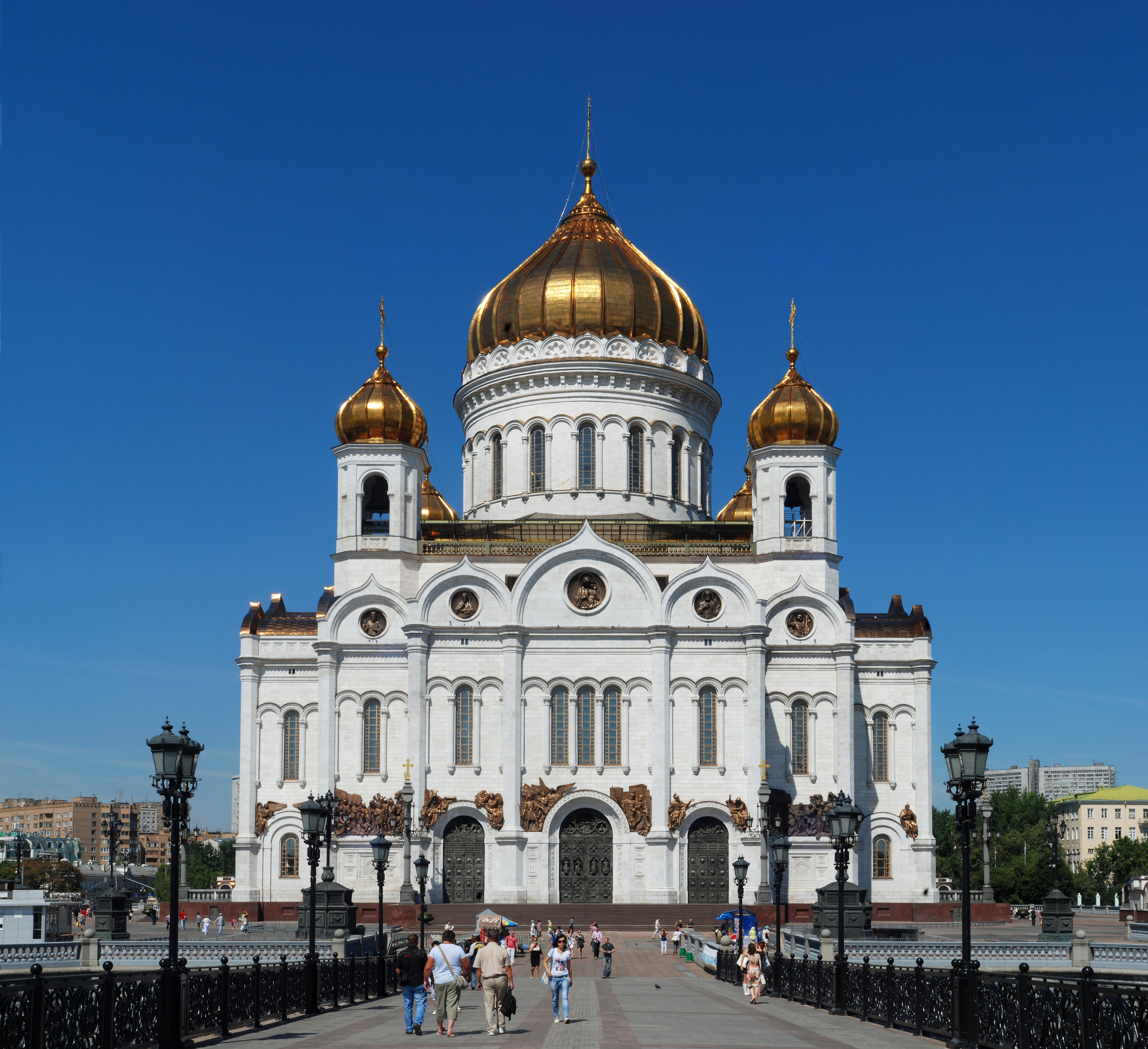
- The new Cathedral of Christ the Saviour as viewed from the bridge over the Moscow River

- Location within Moscow
- Cathedral of Christ the Saviour
- 55°44′40″N 37°36′20″E
- Location: Moscow, Russia
- Denomination: Russian Orthodox
- Website: www.xxc.ru

History
- Consecrated: 19 August 2000; 26 years ago

Architecture
- Style: Russian Revival

Specifications
- Capacity: 9,500 people
- Length: 79 m (259 ft)
- Width: 79 m (259 ft)
- Height: 103.4 m (339 ft) (top cross); 91.5 m (300 ft) (top dome); 69.5 m (228 ft) (dome ceiling)

The Cathedral of Christ the Saviour (Russian: Храм Христа Спасителя, romanized: Khram Khrista Spasitelya, Russian pronunciation: [xram xrʲɪˈsta spɐˈsʲitʲɪlʲə]) is a Russian Orthodox cathedral in Moscow, Russia, on the northern bank of the Moskva River, a few hundred metres southwest of the Kremlin. With an overall height of 103 metres (338 ft), it is the third tallest Orthodox Christian church building in the world.

The current church is the second to stand on this site. The original church, built in the 19th century, took more than 40 years to build, and was the site of the 1882 world premiere of the 1812 Overture composed by Tchaikovsky. It was destroyed in 1931 on the order of the Soviet Politburo. The demolition was supposed to make way for a colossal Palace of the Soviets to house the country's legislature, the Supreme Soviet of the USSR. Construction started in 1937 but was halted in 1941 when Germany invaded the Soviet Union during World War II. Its steel frame was disassembled the following year, and the palace was never built. Following the dissolution of the Soviet Union, the current cathedral was constructed on the site between 1995 and 2000.

== Original cathedral ==
=== Construction ===
When Napoleon Bonaparte retreated from Moscow, Tsar Alexander I signed a manifesto on 25 December 1812 declaring his intention to build a cathedral in honor of Christ the Saviour "to signify Our gratitude to Divine Providence for saving Russia from the doom that overshadowed Her" and as a memorial to the sacrifices of the Russian people. It took some time for work on the projected cathedral to get started. The first finished architectural project, by Aleksandr Lavrentyevich Vitberg, was endorsed by the Tsar in 1817. It was a flamboyant Neoclassical design full of Masonic symbolism.

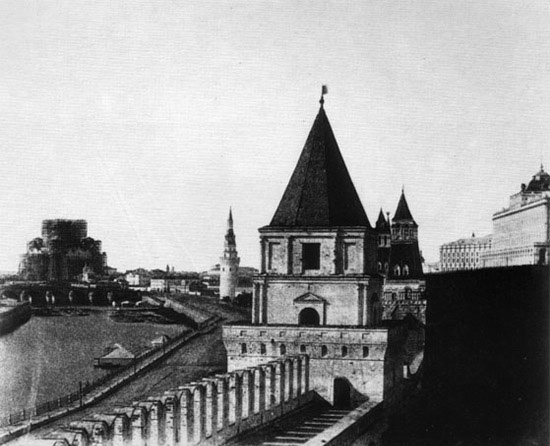
The building under construction in 1852 (as seen from the Kremlin)

Construction work was begun on the Sparrow Hills, the highest point in Moscow, but the site proved unstable. In the meantime Alexander I was succeeded by his brother Nicholas I. Profoundly Orthodox and patriotic, the new Tsar disliked the Neoclassicism and Freemasonry of the design selected by his predecessor. He commissioned his favorite architect Konstantin Thon to create a new design, taking as his model Hagia Sophia in the Byzantine capital Constantinople (present day Istanbul, Turkey). Thon's Russian Revival design was approved in 1832. A new site closer to the Moscow Kremlin was chosen by the Tsar in 1837. A convent and church on the site had to be relocated, so the cornerstone of the new church was not laid until 1839.

The cathedral took many years to build; the scaffolding was not taken down until 1860. Its painting was overseen by Evgraf Sorokin, and thereafter some of the best Russian painters (Ivan Kramskoi, Vasily Surikov, V. P. Vereshchagin) continued to embellish the interior for another twenty years. The giant dome of the cathedral was gilded using the new technique of gold electroplating, replacing the older and insecure technique of mercury gilding. Although Tchaikovsky's 1812 Overture was written with the building's completion in mind, it had its world premiere in a tent outside the unfinished church in August 1882. The cathedral was consecrated on 26 May 1883, the day before Alexander III was crowned.

The inner sanctum of the church (naos) was ringed by a two-floor gallery, its walls inlaid with rare sorts of marble, granite, and other stones. The ground floor of the gallery was a memorial dedicated to the Russian victory over Napoleon. The walls displayed more than 1,000 square metres (11,000 sq ft) of Carrara bianca marble plaques listing major commanders, regiments, and battles of the Patriotic War of 1812 (with the lists of awards and casualties appended). The second floor of the gallery was occupied by church choirs.

=== Demolition ===
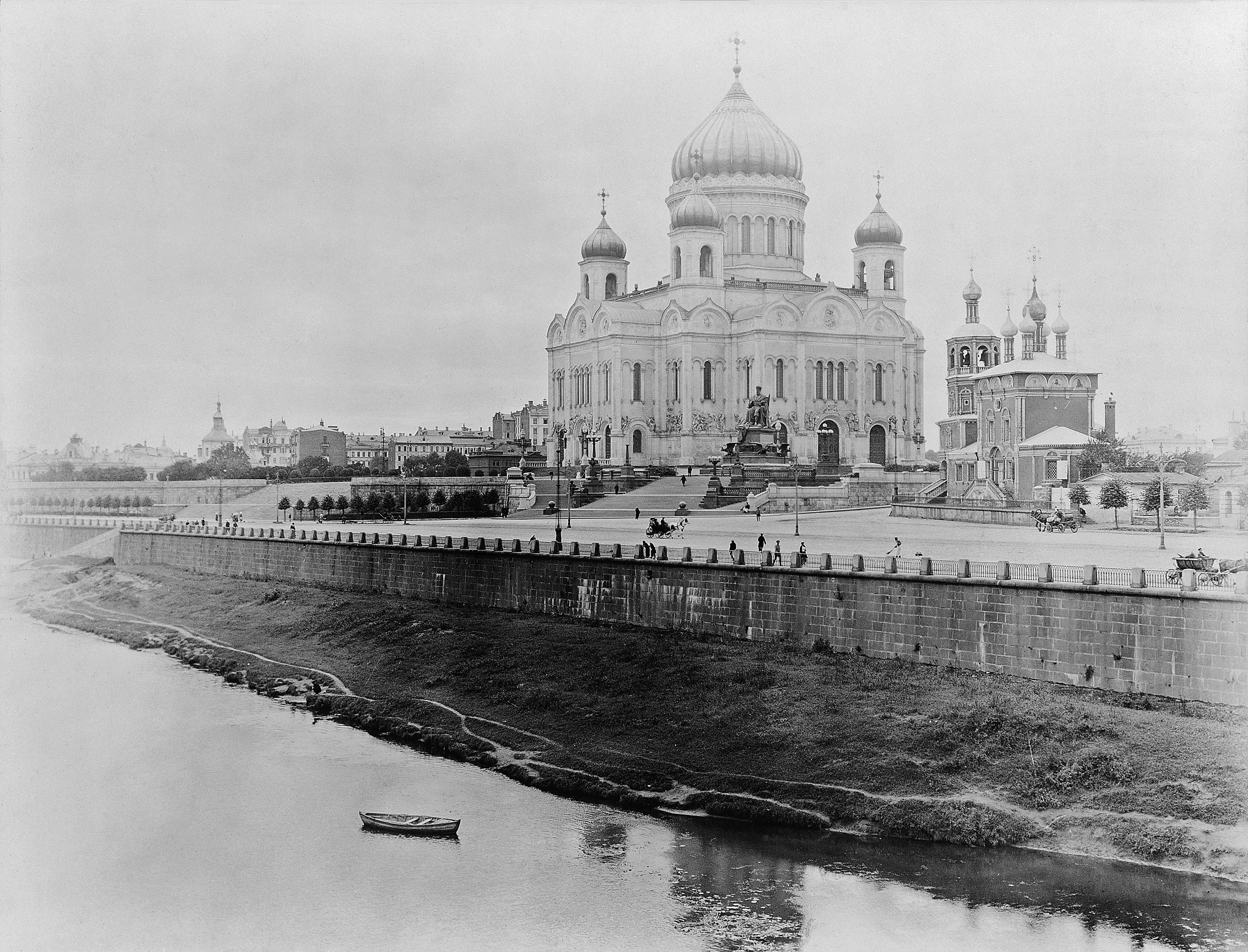
The cathedral in the early 20th century

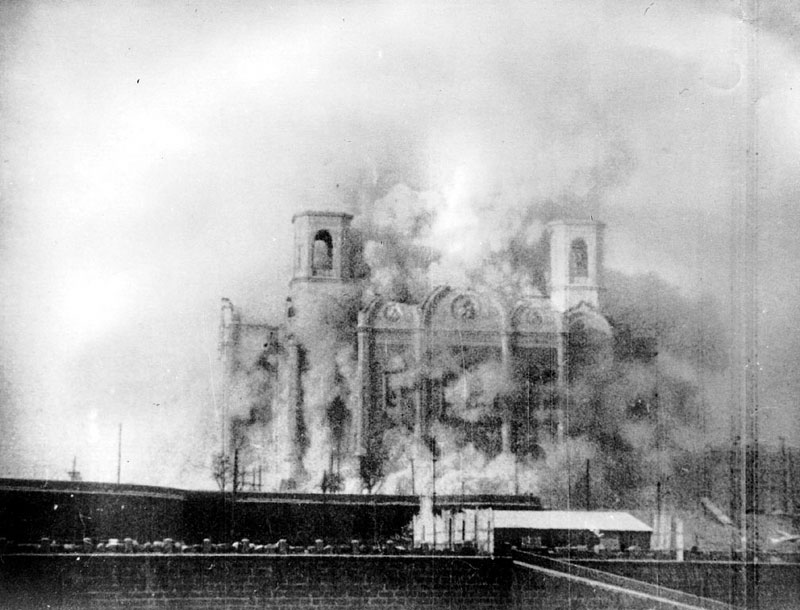
Demolition, 5 December 1931

Following the 1917 Russian Revolution, the USSR's official state atheism resulted in the 1921–1928 anti-religious campaign, during which many "church institution[s] at [the] local, diocesan or national level were systematically destroyed." Following the death of Vladimir Lenin in 1924, Soviet leader Joseph Stalin chose the prominent site of the cathedral as the proposed site for a monument to socialism known as the Palace of the Soviets. It was to have modernistic, buttressed tiers to support a gigantic statue of Lenin perched on top of a dome with his arm raised in the air.

The government plans for economic development in Russia during the 1930s required more funds than were available at the time. In searching for additional sources of revenue and funding, government agencies saw monetary value in religious and historical monuments that had not yet been destroyed or otherwise repurposed for government use. On 24 February 1930, the economic department of the OGPU sent a letter to the Chairman of the Central Executive Committee asking to remove the golden domes of the Christ the Saviour Cathedral. The letter noted that the dome of the church contained over 20 tons of gold of "excellent quality", and that the cathedral represented an "unnecessary luxury for the Soviet Union, and the withdrawal of the gold would make a great contribution to the industrialization of the country." The People's Commissariat of Finance did not object to this proposal.

On 13 July 1931, a meeting of the Central Executive Committee of the Soviet Union was held under the chairmanship of Mikhail Kalinin. The meeting decided to build the Palace of the Soviets on the territory of the Cathedral of Christ the Saviour: "The site for the construction of the Palace of Soviets is chosen to be the square of the Christ the Savior Cathedral in Moscow, including the demolition of the cathedral itself and the necessary expansion of the square." This decision was prepared at a meeting of the Politburo of the All-Union Communist Party (b) on 5 June 1931. 11 days later, the resolution of the Committee for Cult Affairs under the Presidium of the All-Russian Central Executive Committee was adopted:

In view of the allotment of the site on which the Cathedral of Christ the Saviour is located, for the construction of the Palace of Soviets, the said temple should be liquidated and demolished. Instruct the Presidium of the Moscow Oblast Executive Committee to liquidate (close) the church within ten days ... The petition of the OGPU economic department for gold washing and the petition for the construction of the Palace of Soviets for the transfer of building material to be submitted to the secretariat of the All-Russian Central Executive Committee.

For several months, urgent work was carried out to dismantle the cathedral building; it was eventually decided thats its remains would be blown up. On 5 December 1931, the Cathedral of Christ the Saviour was dynamited and reduced to rubble. It took more than a year to clear the debris from the site. The construction of the Palace of Soviets was ultimately halted due to a lack of funds, problems with flooding from the nearby Moskva River, and the German invasion during World War II. Some of the marble from the walls and benches of the cathedral was used in nearby Moscow Metro stations. The original marble high reliefs were preserved and are now on display at the Donskoy Monastery. For many decades, these reliefs were the only reminders of one of the largest Orthodox churches ever built. The flooded foundation hole remained on the site, but in 1958 under Nikita Khrushchev, it was transformed into the world's largest open air swimming pool, named Moskva Pool.

The volume of evaporation from the huge water surface of the pool was the cause of corrosion of neighboring buildings. In particular, employees of the Pushkin Museum complained that the location of the outdoor pool negatively affected the safety of the exhibits.

== Restored cathedral ==
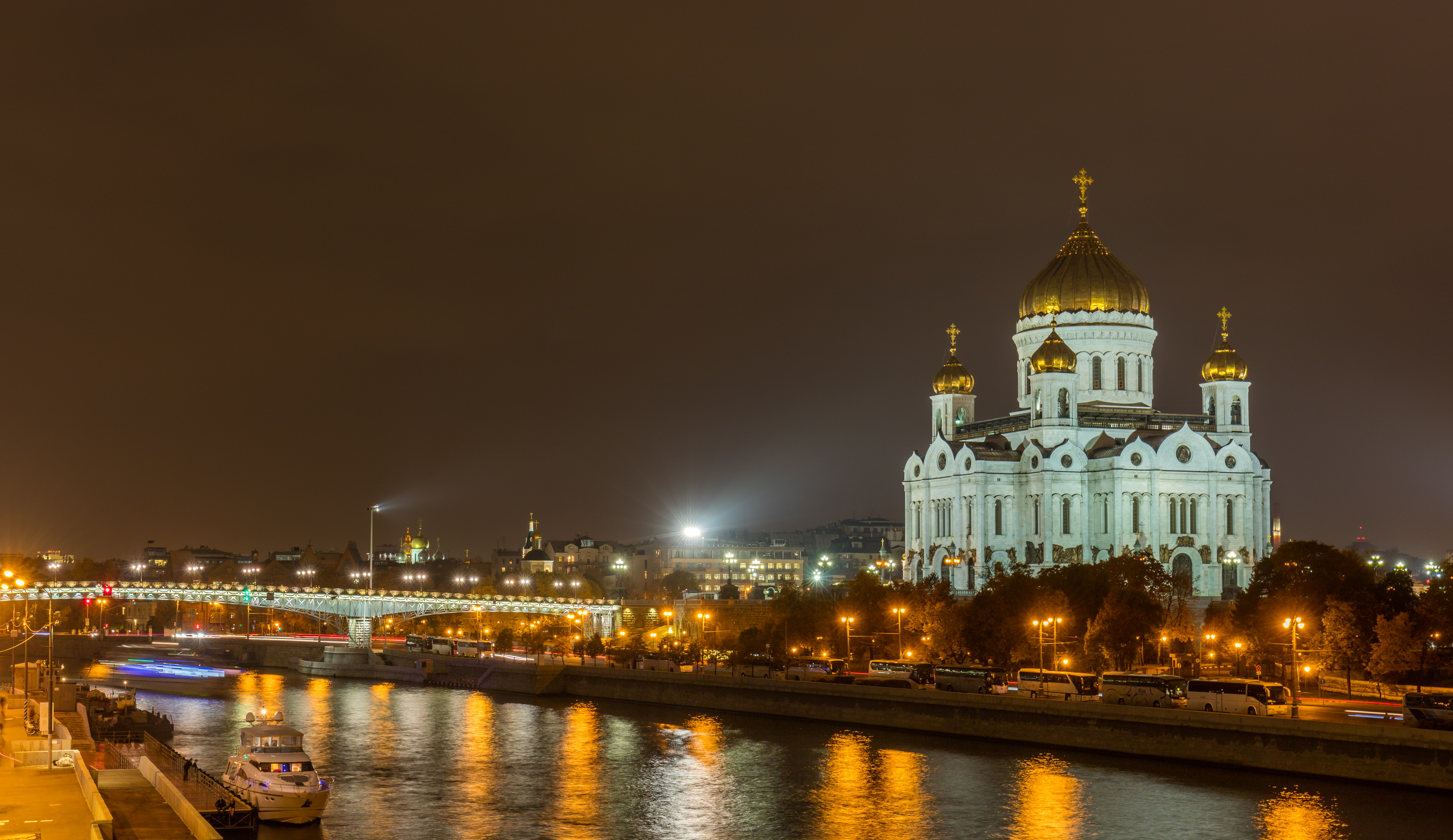
Night view next to the river

In February 1990, the Russian Orthodox Church received permission from the Soviet government to restore the Cathedral of Christ the Saviour. A temporary cornerstone was laid by the end of the year. The architect Aleksey Denisov was called upon to design a replica, but was soon fired from the project because of disagreements with the mayor's office. When construction was well under way, he was replaced by Zurab Tsereteli.

A construction fund was initiated in 1992 and funds began to pour in from citizens in the autumn of 1994, and about one million Muscovites donated money for the project. In this year the Moskva Pool was dismantled and the cathedral reconstruction commenced. The lower church was consecrated to the Saviour's Transfiguration in 1997, and the completed Cathedral of Christ the Saviour was consecrated on the Transfiguration Day, 19 August 2000.

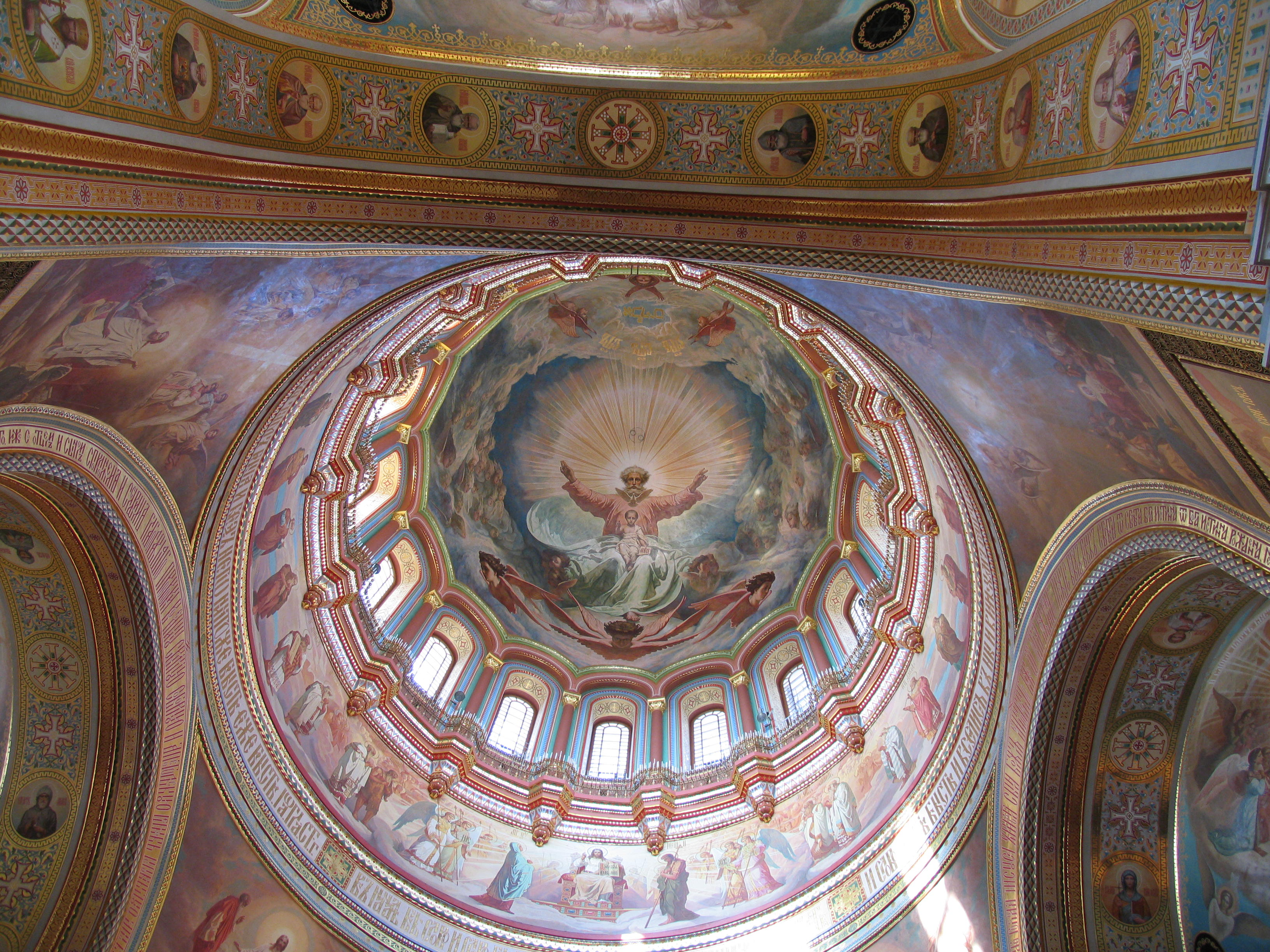
The central dome of the cathedral

Below the new church is a large hall for church assemblies. The cathedral square is graced by several chapels, designed in the same style as the cathedral. A footbridge across the river from Bersenevskaya embankment was constructed between 21 June 2003 and 3 September 2004 (photo). On the slope of the hill to the right of the cathedral the monument to Alexander II is located.

=== Significant events ===
In 2000, the cathedral was the venue for the canonization of the Romanovs when the last Tsar Nicholas II and his family, who were murdered by the Bolsheviks in 1918, were canonized as saints. On 17 May 2007, the Act of Canonical Communion between the Moscow Patriarchate of the Russian Orthodox Church and the Russian Orthodox Church Outside Russia was signed there. The ROCOR had been separate since the 1920s. The full restoration of communion with the Moscow Patriarchate was celebrated by a Divine Liturgy at which the Patriarch of Moscow and All Russia, Alexius II, and the First Hierarch of ROCOR, Metropolitan Laurus, concelebrated the Divine Liturgy for the first time in history.

The first Russian president Boris Yeltsin, who died of heart failure on 23 April 2007, lay in state in the cathedral prior to his burial in Novodevichy Cemetery.

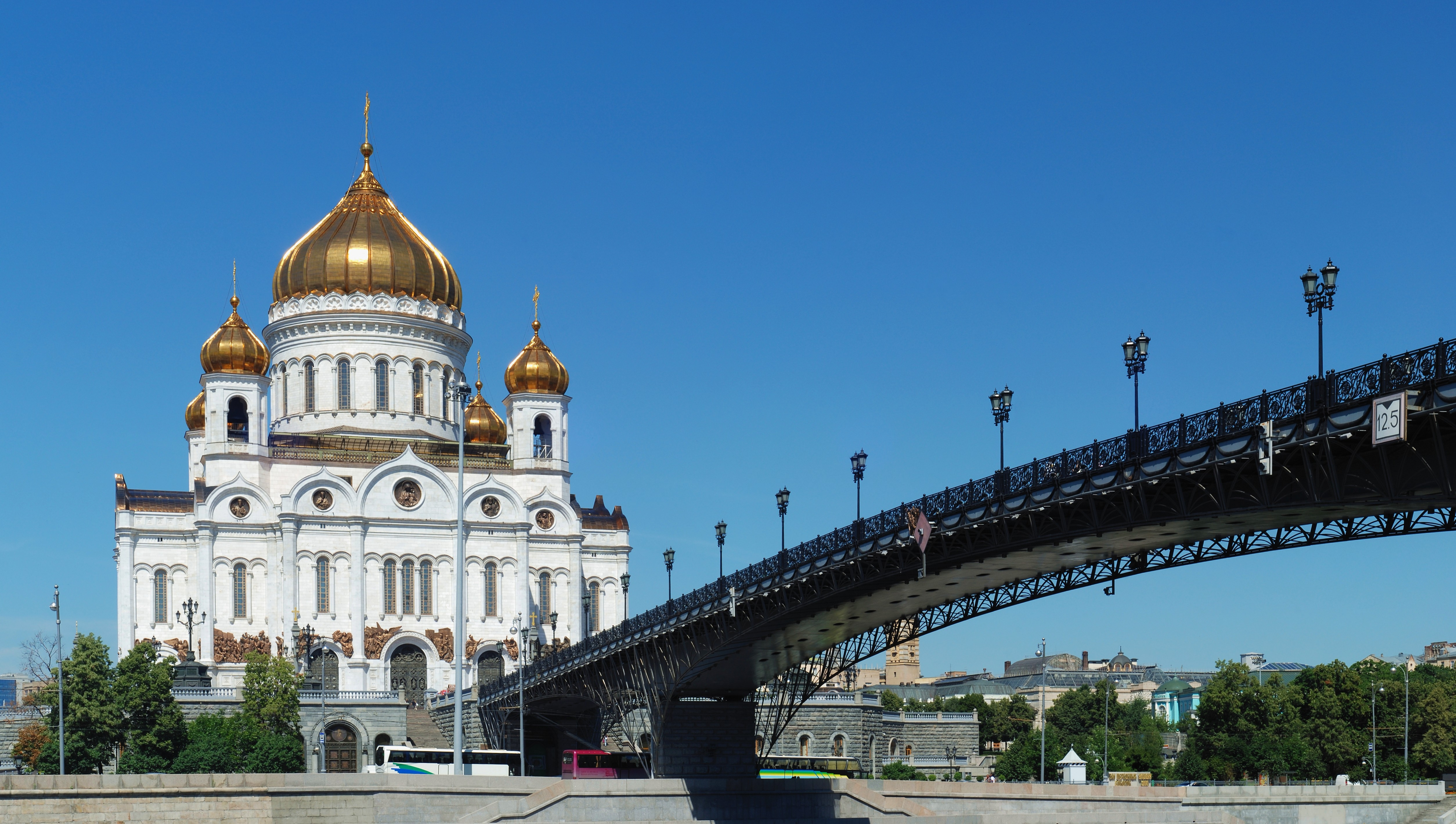
The rebuilt cathedral, view across the Moscow River

In 2009, the cathedral was visited by Metropolitan Jonah (Paffhausen), former primate of the Orthodox Church in America, who celebrated the Liturgy with Patriarch Kirill I. Metropolitan Jonah later described the event, saying that even with a congregation of approximately 2,500, the vast church was only half full. About 16 bishops attended the ordination of a new bishop that day.

On February 21, 2012, Russian feminist punk rock group Pussy Riot staged a guerrilla performance in the cathedral in protest against Vladimir Putin, singing "Mother of God, please banish Putin!" Five members of the band participated in the performance. Three members were identified, while the other two fled Russia. Those three members, Yekaterina Samutsevich, Maria Alyokhina and Nadezhda Tolokonnikova, were jailed for hooliganism.

On 26 November 2025, in the Hall of Church Councils, Russian actor and poet Vadim Dzyuba delivered a speech in support of political prisoners during a concert marking the 130th anniversary of Sergei Yesenin.

== See also ==
- List of churches in Moscow
- List of largest Eastern Orthodox church buildings
- List of tallest domes
- USSR anti-religious campaign (1928–1941)

== Image gallery ==
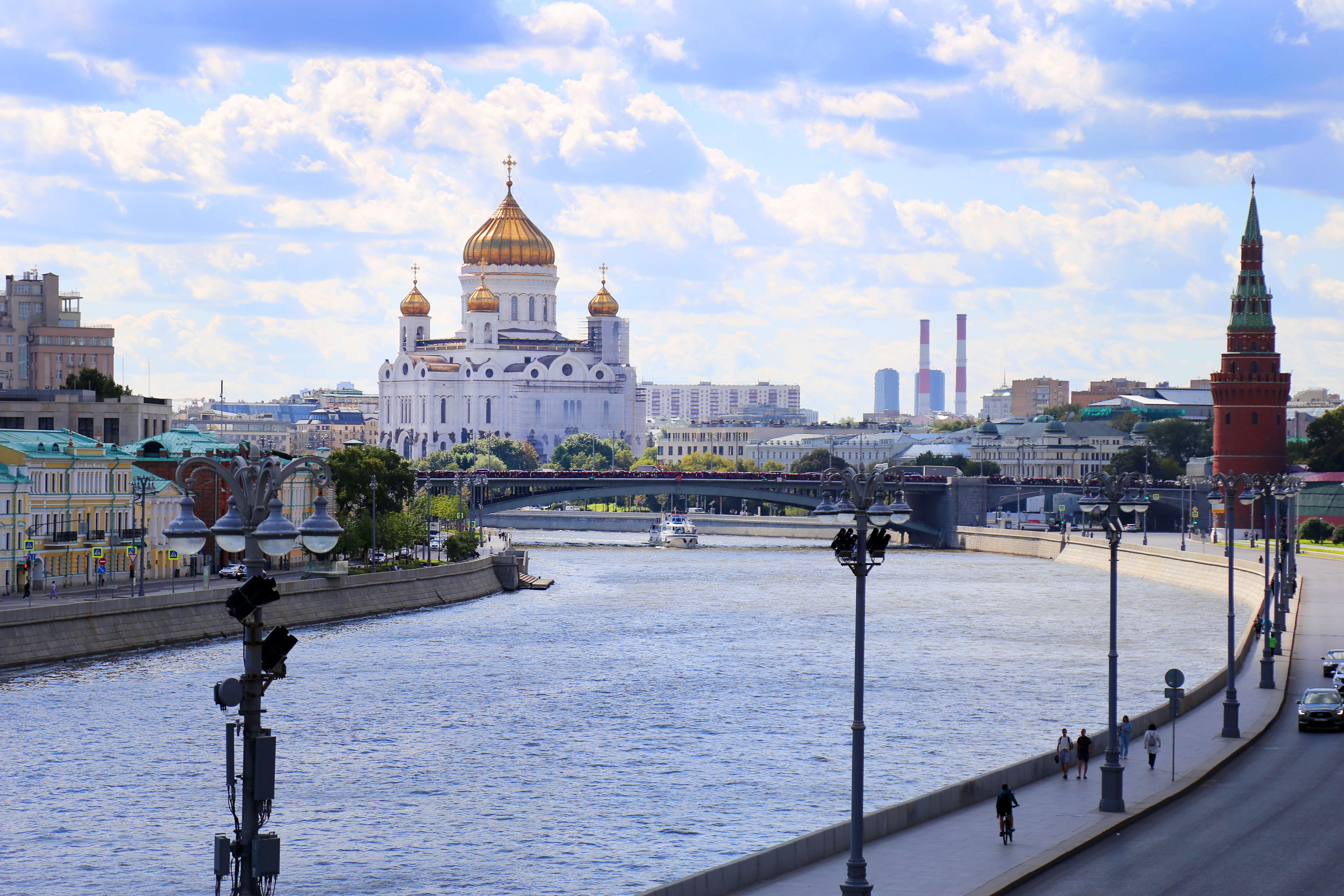

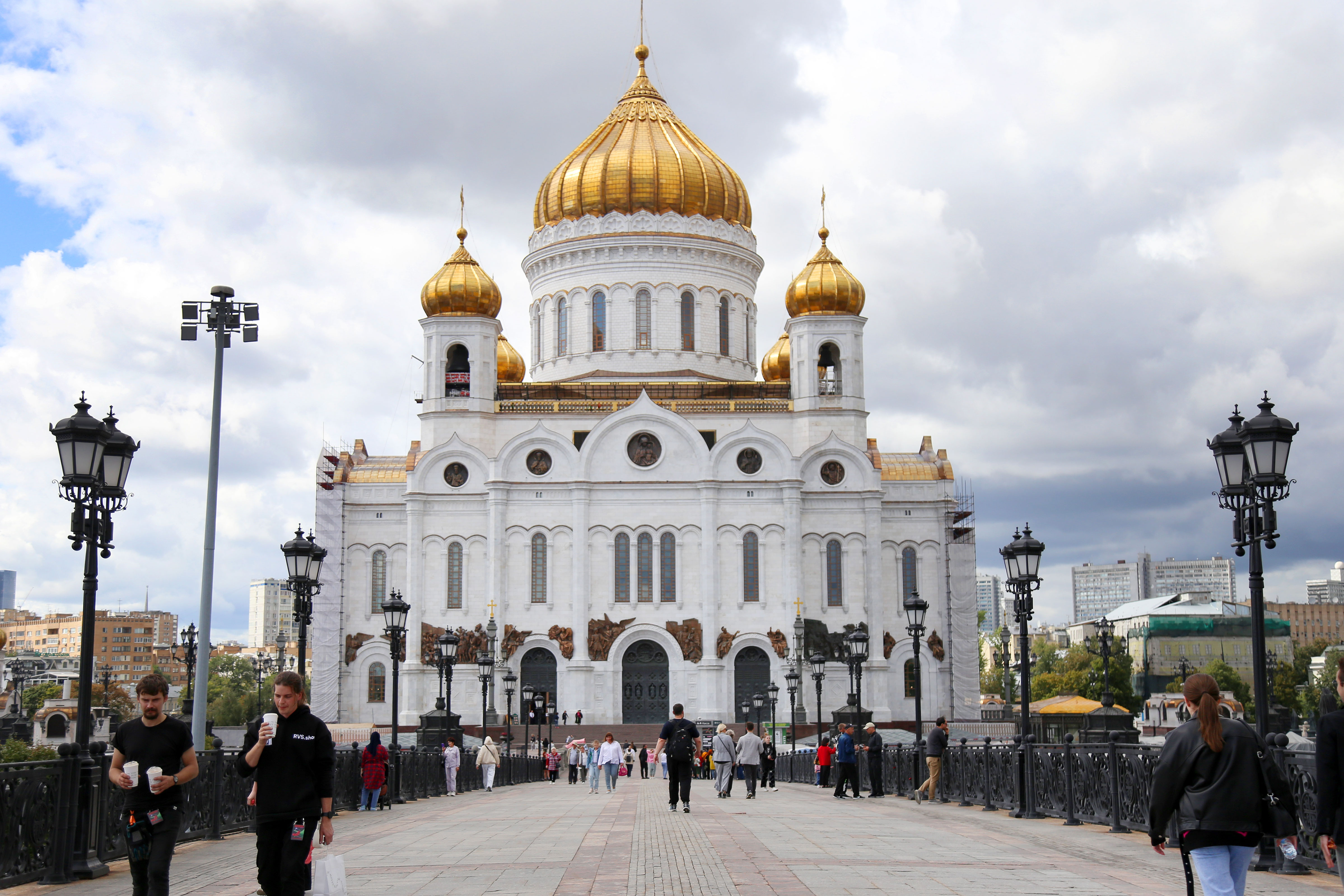
