= Metro (2013 film) =

- Directed by: Anton Megerdichev
- Written by: Viktoriya Evseeva; Denis Kuryshev
- Produced by: Igor Tolstunov; Sergey Kozlov; Anna Kagarlitskaya
- Starring: Sergei Puskepalis; Svetlana Khodchenkova; Anatoly Bely
- Cinematography: Sergey Astakhov; Sergey Shultz
- Edited by: Anton Megerdichev
- Music by: Yuriy Poteenko; Alex HarDrum
- Production company: PROFIT
- Distributed by: Nashe Kino
- Release date: 21 February 2013
- Running time: 132 minutes
- Country: Russia
- Language: Russian
- Budget: $9 million
- Box office: $12,000,000 (Domestic) $15,000,000 (Worldwide)

Metro (Russian: Метро) is a 2013 Russian disaster film directed by Anton Megerdichev. It is based on the 2005 novel of the same name by Dmitry Safonov.

== Plot ==
On the Metro, in the tunnel near Park Kultury station, built in 1935, is starting to collapse and fall apart. One tunnel night crawler, Sergeitch (Sergey Sosnowski), notices water leaking into the tunnel where it passes underneath the Moscow River and informs the assistant station master (Michael Fateev), who mocks the old man for worrying about it, saying that it is only groundwater. Meanwhile, Irina Garina (Svetlana Hodchenkova) is torn between her lover, businessman Vlad Konstantinov (Anatoly Bely), and her husband, surgeon Andrei Garin (Sergei Puskepalis). Konstantinov tries to persuade Irina to divorce Andrei. Arriving from a trip abroad, Irina spends the night with Konstantinov rather than going home. Andrei has to take their daughter Ksenya (Anfisa Wistinghausen) to school but by chance, they go to the "Garden" metro station. Simultaneously, Konstantinov arrives, hurrying to work and forced to park his car because of traffic jams. Meanwhile, Sergeitch, drinking with casual acquaintance Galina (Elena Panova) next to the "Garden", recalls that the water leaking into the tunnel smelled of slime, which means that it cannot be groundwater. They are detained by the police for drinking alcohol in a public place but Galina manages to escape, and flees into the subway. In custody Sergeitch asks for a phone to tell the dispatcher everything, but the police turn a deaf ear to his pleas.

In the tunnel, the water from the river pours through the ceiling and floods the railway line. The driver of the Metro train (Konstantin Ovseannicov) that by coincidence contains Garin, Konstantinov and Galina, applies the emergency brake. The train then derails and crashes into the water and rubble. Some of the passengers are killed. Konstantinov, instead of going along the railway track, climbs onto the roof of the carriage. Crawling along, he sees Garin, who is trying to find Ksjushu in a pile of bodies, and helps Garin. Garin is going to follow the others, but Konstantinov stops him, pointing out that the conductor rail is still electrically live and has not been turned off. The water level rises, a short circuit occurs, and all the people who could not escape the flooded area of the tunnel are killed by electrocution. Garin, Konstantinov and Galina, courier Michael (Stanislav Duzhkinov) and a couple, Denis (Alex Bardukov) and Alisa (Katerina Shpitsa), finally can seek to escape. All except Michael hurriedly make their way into a passage leading to a tunnel maintenance and ventilation shaft and emergency exit. Michael, being very frightened, refuses to enter the passage and dies when the carriage flips over.

From the passage the protagonists fall into a small bunker, built during the construction of the underground railway system. Above it, the vertical maintenance and ventilation shaft ends in a sewer grate. However, they cannot reach the grate, as it is too high, nor can they use their mobile phones underground. The water level in the tunnel and in the well begins to rise rapidly. Tension between Konstantinov and Garin rises, as the latter cannot understand why Konstantinov feels an interest in his daughter. When the water level raises them to the level of the grate, Garin and Konstantinov manage to phone Irina, but only have time to tell her that they are in the bunker. They try to attract attention through the bars, but to no avail. Irina is hysterically trying to inform the rescue team that people are in the bunker. But at this time the hydrostatic pressure of the water uncouples and breaks off the train driving car, and the water level in the shaft falls sharply, pulling the characters back into the tunnel. The rescuers descend into the bunker, but seeing the wet walls, assume that all who were there had most likely drowned.

The protagonists get to the ghost station "Borodino" (close to the "Garden") and climb onto the platform to rest. Garin makes some indirect hints to Konstantinov that show that he realizes that Konstantinov and Irina are lovers. Konstantinov and Garin fight and Konstantinov nearly drowns in the water.

In the tunnel where the train is stuck, the overhead arch collapses and water fills the tunnel. The leaders of the rescue operation manage to turn off the water tap. The protagonists get to the bunker and finally get out through the bars onto the street. Alisa and Dennis together leave the hospital. Garin and Irina tensely meet in a scene where Garin silently deflects all her pleas. The film ends with a scene where Konstantinov is driving around in different directions following the ambulance containing Garin.

== Cast ==
- Sergei Puskepalis as Andrei Garin
- Anatoly Bely as Vladislav Konstantinov
- Svetlana Khodchenkova as Irina Garina
- Anfisa Vistingauzen as Ksenia Garina
- Aleksey Bardukov as Denis Istomin
- Katerina Shpitsa as Alisa
- Yelena Panova as Galina
- Sergey Sosnovsky as Petrunin

== Reception ==
The film received mostly positive reviews from critics. Negative reviews noted the discrepancy between the plot of the film and the real underground and its services. The movie grossed $12 million in the domestic market and $15 million worldwide against a budget of $9 million thereby making it an average commercial success.
