= Anton Megerdichev =

Russian director and screenwriter (born 1969)

- Антон Мегердичев
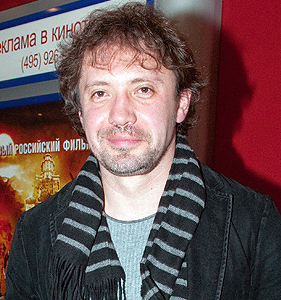
- Born: Anton Yevgenievich Megerdichev; July 22, 1969 (age 55); Moscow, RSFSR, USSR
- Citizenship: Soviet Union; Russian
- Occupation(s): film director, screenwriter, film editor

Anton Yevgenievich Megerdichev (Russian: Анто́н Евге́ньевич Мегерди́чев; born July 22, 1969) is a Russian director and screenwriter.

== Filmography ==
- Russian Empire. The Project of Leonid Parfyonov (2000)
- Shadowboxing 2: Revenge (2007)
- Dark World (2010)
- Metro (2013)
- Yolki 3 (2013)
- Going Vertical (2017)
- Land of Legends (2022)
