= Alexander Gordon (journalist) =

Russian journalist

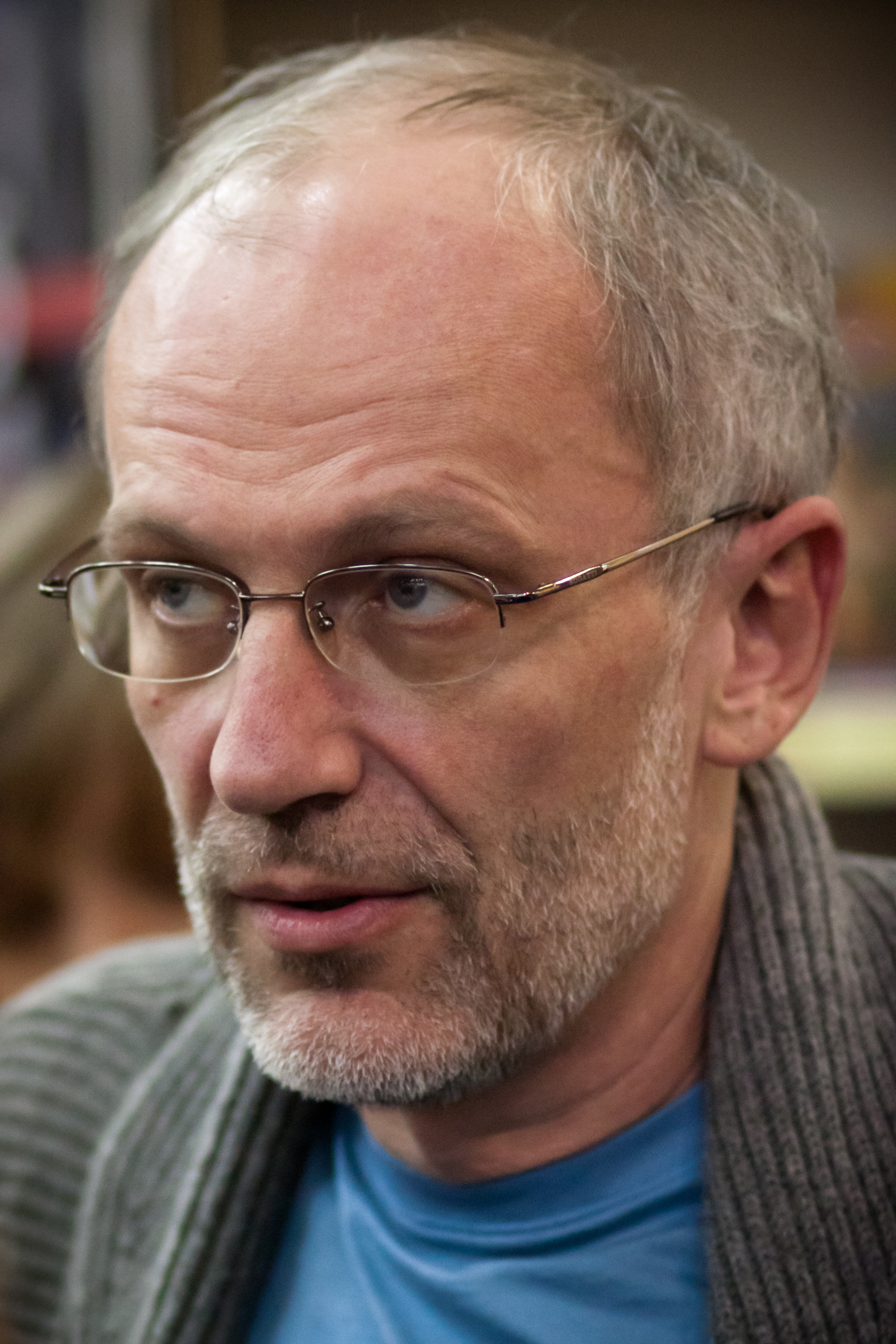
- Gordon in 2011
- Born: Alexander Garrievich Gordon; February 20, 1964 (age 62); Obninsk, Kaluga Oblast, RSFSR, USSR
- Citizenship: Soviet Union: Russia; United States
- Occupations: Radio; TV presenter; journalist; actor; director
- Spouse: Maria Berdnikova (m. 1980, divorced) Ekaterina Gordon (m. 2000; div. 2006) Nina Trigorina (m. 2011–2013) Nozanin Abdulvasieva (m. 2014; div. 2020) Sofia Kalandadze (m. 2022)
- Partner(s): Nana Kiknadze (separated)
- Children: 4
- Writing career
- Notable awards: TEFI (2007, 2008 — twice, 2010, 2011)

Alexander Garrievich Gordon (Russian: Алeксандp Гаppиeвич Гордон, born February 20, 1964) is a Russian radio and television presenter, journalist, actor and director. He has worked on "NTV" channel and "Channel One". As of January 2023, Gordon is the host of First Channel's Dok-Tok.

== Personal life ==
Gordon is Russian Jewish descent. He is a son of the poet and artist from Odessa, Harry Gordon and Antonina Striga. He has been married five times and has four children.

== Honors and awards ==
- 2007 - TEFI for the "Talk Show" (program "Private screening").
- 2008 - TEFI for the categories "Talk Show" and "talk-show" (the program "private screening").
- 2010 - TEFI for the "Talk show host" (the program "Gordon Quixote").
- 2011 - TEFI for the "Talk show host" (the program "private screening").

== Filmography ==
Gordon has also been a film-maker, creating several full-length feature films. Two of his movies, The Shepherd of His Cows and Brothel Lights, were based on the works of his father.

=== Director ===
- 2002 - "The Shepherd of His Cows" (based on the book by Harry Gordon)
- 2009 - "Liberal Democratic Party. 20 years of face-to-Russia"
- 2010 - "Blizzard"
- 2011 - "Brothel Lights"
