= Gubakha =

Town in Perm Krai, Russia

Gubakha Губаха
- Town
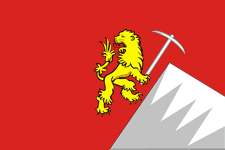
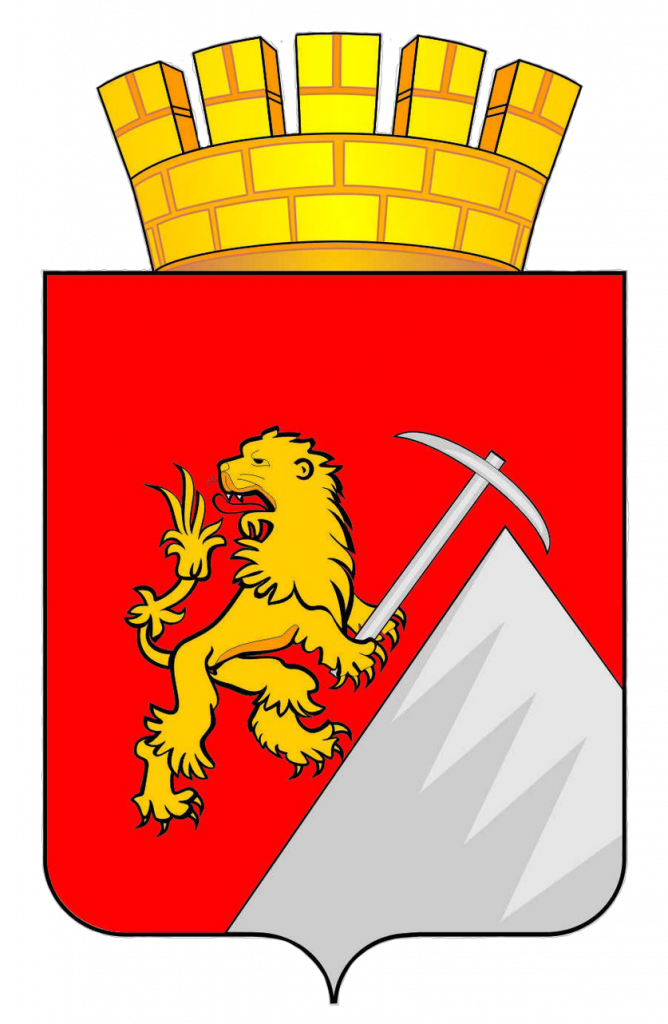
- Flag Coat of arms
- Interactive map of Gubakha
- Location of Gubakha Gubakha (Perm Krai)
- Coordinates: 58°52′14″N 57°35′36″E
- Country: Russia
- Federal subject: Perm Krai
- Founded: mid-18th century
- Town status since: 1941
- Elevation: 300 m (980 ft)

Population (2010 Census)
  - Total: 28,111
  - Estimate (2023): 22,915 (−18.5%)

Administrative status
  - Subordinated to: town of krai significance of Gubakha
  - Capital of: town of krai significance of Gubakha

Municipal status
  - Urban okrug: Gubakhinsky Urban Okrug
  - Capital of: Gubakhinsky Urban Okrug
- Time zone: UTC+5 (MSK+2)
- Postal code: 618250
- OKTMO ID: 57516000001

Gubakha (Russian: Губа́ха) is a town in Perm Krai, Russia, located on the Kosva River (Kama's tributary) 400 kilometers (250 mi) northeast of Perm. Population: 28,111 (2010 census); 31,687 (2002 census); 36,858 (1989 Soviet census).

== History ==
Gubakha arose in 1755 due to the discovery of iron ore in Krestovaya mountain. The village of Gubakha stood at the confluence of the Gubashka River into the Kosva River and served as a wharf for barges that transported iron ore from the upper Kosva to the Kama. In 1825 first coal was found in Gubakha on Krestovaya mountain where the first mine adit was laid. Initially coal mining was carried out in very limited extent, the coal was fused down the Kosva river to the smelting works. After the railway was built in 1879 the coal mining increased sharply.

In 1928 Gubakha was given a status of city settlement. In 1936 the first phase of the largest in the country and the first in the Urals coke producing plant - Gubakhinskiy coke plant - was started up. After repeated changes, by the middle of the 60's the suburban area of Gubakha had acquired its modern outline. On November 4, 1959, the town of Ugleuralsk was annexed to Gubakha.

== Administrative and municipal status ==
Within the framework of administrative divisions, it is, together with two work settlements and six rural localities, incorporated as the town of krai significance of Gubakha—an administrative unit with the status equal to that of the districts. Being a municipal division, the town of krai significance of Gubakha is incorporated as Gubakha Urban Okrug.

== Economy ==
The town's economy includes several industrial facilities producing coke, chemicals, biochemicals, toys and power. An industrial base was built in Gubakha during World War II. Equipment from an evacuated nitrogen fertilizer plant was moved to Gubakha. Later, German reparations were used to increase the capital equipment in Gubakha. The plant was officially recognized as operational in 1955. During 1957 the plant may have been one of the first in Russia to operate a gas coke oven. In 1964 the plant began producing Methyl(ethyl)amines which are necessary for rocket fuel.

In 1993, the industrial association made up of the various chemical production facilities was reorganized into a joint stock company called Metrafrax. 51% of the company stock was sold to employees. Several agreements to build up waste treatment, expand and update the factory, and to build apartment blocks and a brewing facility were also concluded.

The Kizel State Regional Power Plant is located in Gubakha.

Gubakha Coke has capacity to produce 1.3 million mt of metallurgical coke annually. The plant has never produced at capacity.

== Facilities ==
The town has a medical school and an orphanage.
