= Kosva =

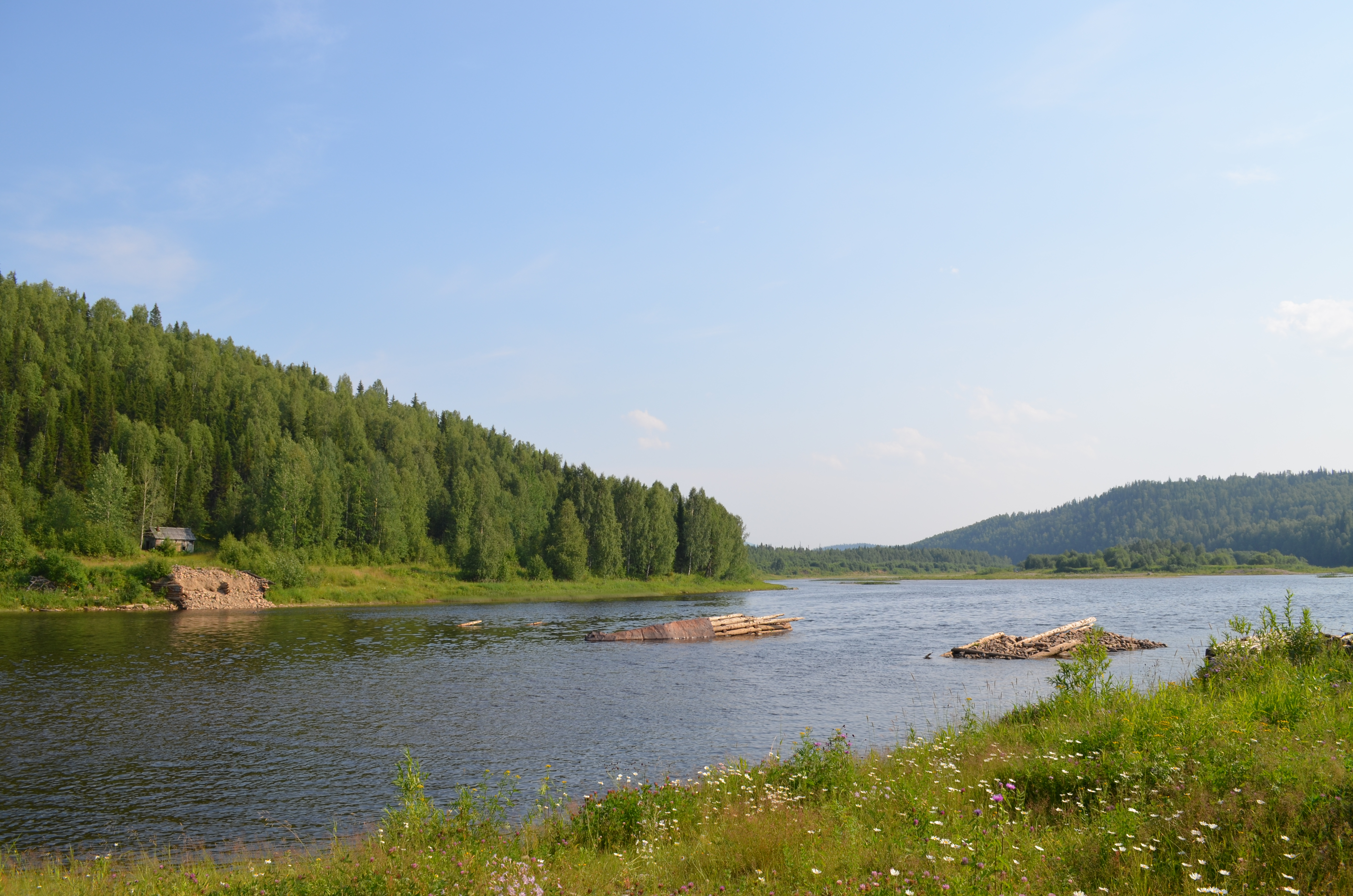

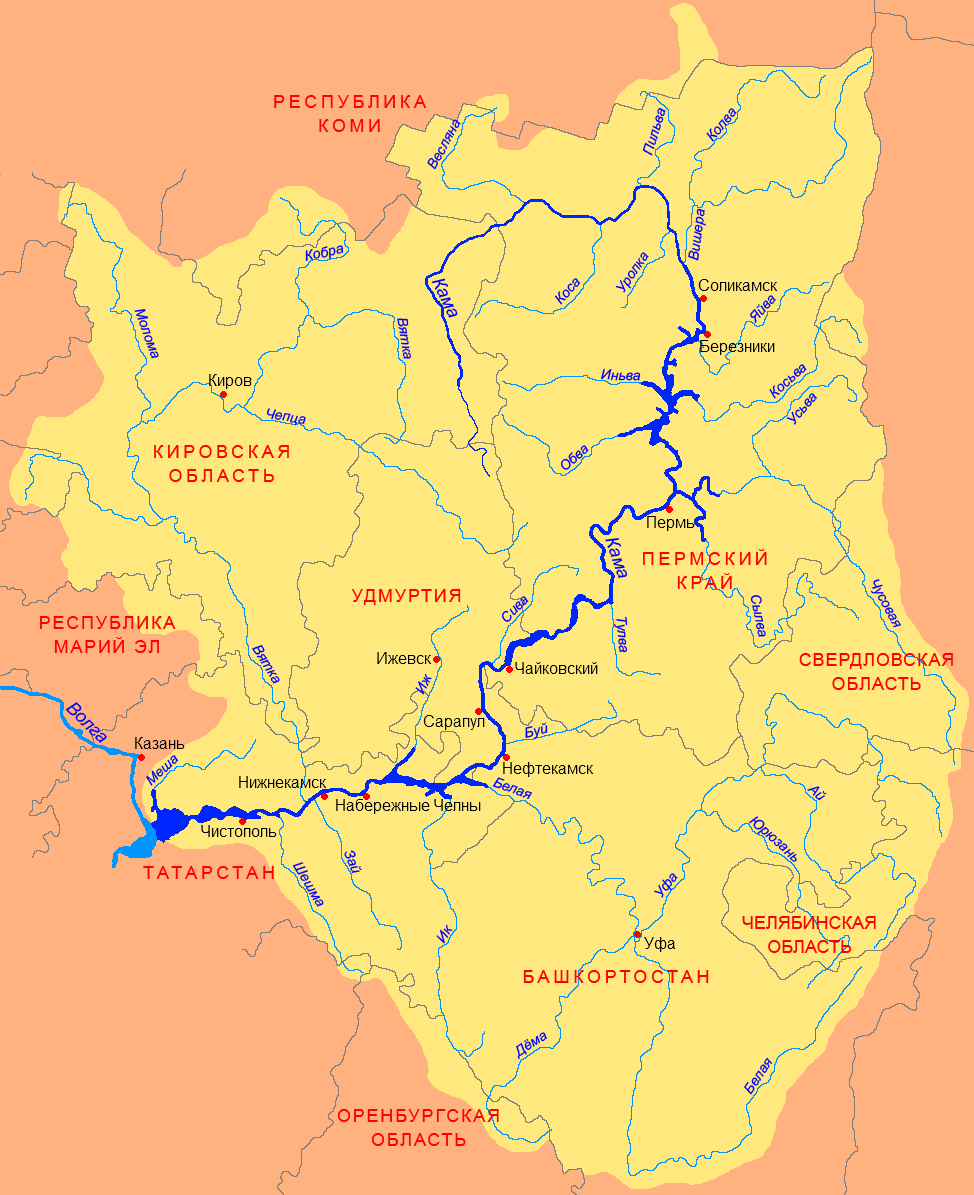
- Scheme of the Kama River Basin.

Location
- Country: Russia

Physical characteristics
- Source
  - location: North Ural
- Mouth: Kama Reservoir
  - coordinates: 58°53′37″N 56°37′47″E
- Length: 283 km (176 mi)
- Basin size: 6,300 km^{2} (2,400 sq mi)
- Discharge
  - average: 90 m^{3}/s (3,200 cu ft/s)

Basin features
- Progression: Kama Reservoir→ Kama→ Volga→ Caspian Sea

The Kosva (Russian: Ко́сьва) is a river in Perm Krai and Sverdlovsk Oblast, Russia, a left tributary of the Kama. It is 283 kilometres (176 mi) long, with a drainage basin of 6,300 square kilometres (2,400 mi^{2}).

The river starts in the western portion of Sverdlovsk Oblast at the confluence of the Bolshaya Kosva (Large Kosva), flowing from the Pravdinsky Rock, and the Malaya Kosva (Small Kosva), flowing from the southern slope of the Kosvinsky Rock. It flows towards the west, and ends up in a bay of the Kama Reservoir. The Kosva is a mountain river with many waterfalls and rapids, among them the 6-kilometre (4 mi) long Tulymsky Falls. In the middle parts of the river lies the Shirokovskaya hydroelectric power plant with Shirokovskoe Reservoir. The town of Gubakha is situated by the Kosva.

Main tributaries:

- Left: Kyrya;
- Right: Tylay, Typyl, Nyar, Nyur, Pozhva
