= Cherdyn =

Cherdyn (Russian: Чердынь) is the name of several inhabited localities in Russia:

Urban localities

- Cherdyn, Perm Krai, a town in Cherdynsky District of Perm Krai

Rural localities

- Cherdyn, Krasnoyarsk Krai, a village in Nazarovsky District of Krasnoyarsk Krai
