= Alexander Gradsky discography =

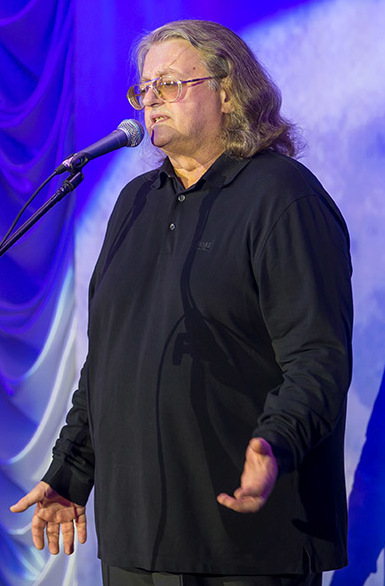
- Gradsky performing in 2014
- Studio albums: 15
- Soundtrack albums: 6
- Live albums: 3
- Compilation albums: 6
- Singles: 4
- Video albums: 1

The discography of Russian singer and composer Alexander Gradsky includes fifteen studio albums, three live albums, six soundtrack albums, six compilations, one video album and four singles.

== Albums ==
=== Studio albums ===
| Title | Album details |
|---|---|
| Russkiye pesni | Released: 1980; Label: Melodiya; Format: LP, CD, digital |
| Sama zhizn | Released: 1984; Label: Melodiya; Format: LP, CD, digital |
| Zvezda poley | Released: 1987; Label: Melodiya; Format: LP, CD, digital |
| Satiry | Released: 1987; Label: Melodiya; Format: LP, MC, CD, digital |
| Utopiya A. G. | Released: 1987; Label: Melodiya; Format: LP, CD, digital |
| Razmyshleniya shuta | Released: 1987; Label: Melodiya; Format: LP |
| Fleyta i royal | Released: 1988; Label: Melodiya; Format: LP, CD, digital |
| Nostalgiya | Released: 1988; Label: Melodiya; Format: LP, CD, digital |
| Chelovek | Released: 1988; Label: Melodiya; Format: LP, CD, digital |
| Kontsert-syuita | Released: 1989; Label: Melodiya; Format: LP, MC |
| Ekspeditsiya | Released: 1990; Label: Melodiya; Format: LP |
| Metamorphoses | Released: 21 March 1991 (Japan); Label: Victor; Format: CD |
| Frukty s kladbishcha | Released: 1994; Label: MTKMO; Format: CD, MC, digital |
| Khrestomatiya | Released: 2003; Label: MTKMO; Format: CD, MC, digital |
| Neformat | Released: 2011; Label: Format: |

=== Live albums ===
| Title | Album details |
|---|---|
| Zhivyyom v "Rossii" | Released: 1996; Label: MTKMO; Format: CD, DVD |
| Zhivyyom v "Rossii" – 2 | Released: 2000; Label: MTKMO; Format: CD, DVD |
| Kontsert 2010 | Released: 1 May 2014; Label: MTKMO; Format: CD |

=== Soundtrack albums ===
| Title | Album details |
|---|---|
| Romans o vlyublyonnykh | Released: 1974; Label: Melodiya; Format: LP |
| Pesni iz k/f "Solntse, snova solntse" | Released: 1976; Label: Melodiya; Format: LP |
| Pesni iz kinofilma "Moya lyubov na trtyem kurse" (with Aleksandra Pakhmutova) | Released: 1976; Label: Melodiya; Format: LP |
| Stadion | Released: 1985; Label: Melodiya; Format: LP, CD, digital |
| Monte-Kristo | Released: 1988; Label: Melodiya; Format: LP, CD, digital |
| Master i Margarita | Released: 2009; Label: MTKMO; Format: CD |

=== Compilation albums ===
| Title | Album details |
|---|---|
| Zolotoye staryo | Released: 1996; Label: MTKMO; Format: CD, MC, digital |
| Nesvoyevremennyye pesni | Released: 1996; Label: MTKMO; Format: CD, MC, digital |
| Legendy russkogo roka | Released: 1997; Label: Moroz Records; Format: CD, MC, digital |
| Kollektsiya | Released: 1998; Label: MTKMO; Format: CD (x 13) |
| Izbrannoye | Released: 2011; Label: MTKMO; Format: CD (x 2) |
| Velikiye ispolniteli XX veka | Released: 2018; Label: Moroz Records; Format: digital |

=== Video albums ===
| Title | Album details |
|---|---|
| Antiperestroyechnyy blyuz | Released: 2010; Label: MTKMO; Format: DVD |

== Singles ==
| Title | Year |
|---|---|
| "Lyubov" / "Pesnya o druzhbe" b/w "Pesnya o ptitsakh" / "Pesnya o materi" | 1974 |
| "Skomorokhi" / "Siny les" b/w "Ispytaniya" / "Podruga ugolshchika" | 1974 |
| "V polyakh nad snegom i dozhdyom" / "Nash stary dom" b/w "Ya – Goya" / "Pesnya shuta" | 1978 |
| "Nam ne zhit drug bez druga" b/w "Mne s detstva snilas vysota" | 1983 |
