= List of Russian films of 1998 =

A list of films produced in Russia in 1998 (see 1998 in film).

== 1998 ==
Title	Russian title	Director	Cast	Genre	Notes
Classic	Классик	Georgy Shengeliya	Sergey Nikonenko	Crime	
Composition for Victory Day	Сочинение ко Дню Победы	Sergei Ursuliak	Oleg Yefremov	Drama	
Contract with Death	Контракт со смертью	Dmitry Astrakhan	Andrey Myagkov	Drama	
Crossroads	Перекрёсток	Dmitry Astrakhan	Leonid Yarmolnik	Romantic comedy	
Happy Birthday	С днём рождения!	Larisa Sadilova	Patrick Baehr	Drama	
I Want to Go to Prison	Хочу в тюрьму	Alla Surikova	Vladimir Ilyin	Comedy	
Khrustalyov, My Car!	Хрусталёв, машину!	Aleksei German	Yuri Tsurilo	Drama	
Mama Don't Cry	Мама не горюй	Maksim Pezhemsky	Gosha Kutsenko	Comedy	
Marigolds in Flower	Цветы календулы	Sergey Snezhkin	Era Ziganshina	Drama	
Of Freaks and Men	Про уродов и людей	Aleksei Balabanov	Sergei Makovetsky	Drama	
Peculiarities of the National Fishing	Особенности национальной рыбалки	Alexander Rogozhkin, Inna Gorlova	Aleksei Buldakov	Comedy	
Retro Threesome	Ретро втроём	Pyotr Todorovsky	Elena Yakovleva	Drama	
Silver Heads	Серебряные головы	Yevgeny Yufit	Tatiana Verkhovskaya	Comedy	
Tests for Real Men	Тесты для настоящих мужчин	Andrey Razenkov	Elvira Bolgova	Drama	
The Barber of Siberia	Сибирский цирюльник	Nikita Mikhalkov	Julia Ormond	Drama	
The Outskirts	Окраина	Pyotr Lutsik	Yuri Dubrovin	Drama	
Time of a Dancer	Время танцора	Vadim Abdrashitov	Andrey Egorov	Drama	
Who If Not Us	Кто, если не мы	Valeriy Priyomykhov	Yevgeny Krainov	Drama	
Why Wouldn't We Send a Messenger?	Не послать ли нам… гонца?	Valeri Chikov	Mikhail Evdokimov	Comedy	

== See also ==
- 1998 in Russia
