= Anatoliy Kotenyov =

Belarusian actor (born 1958)

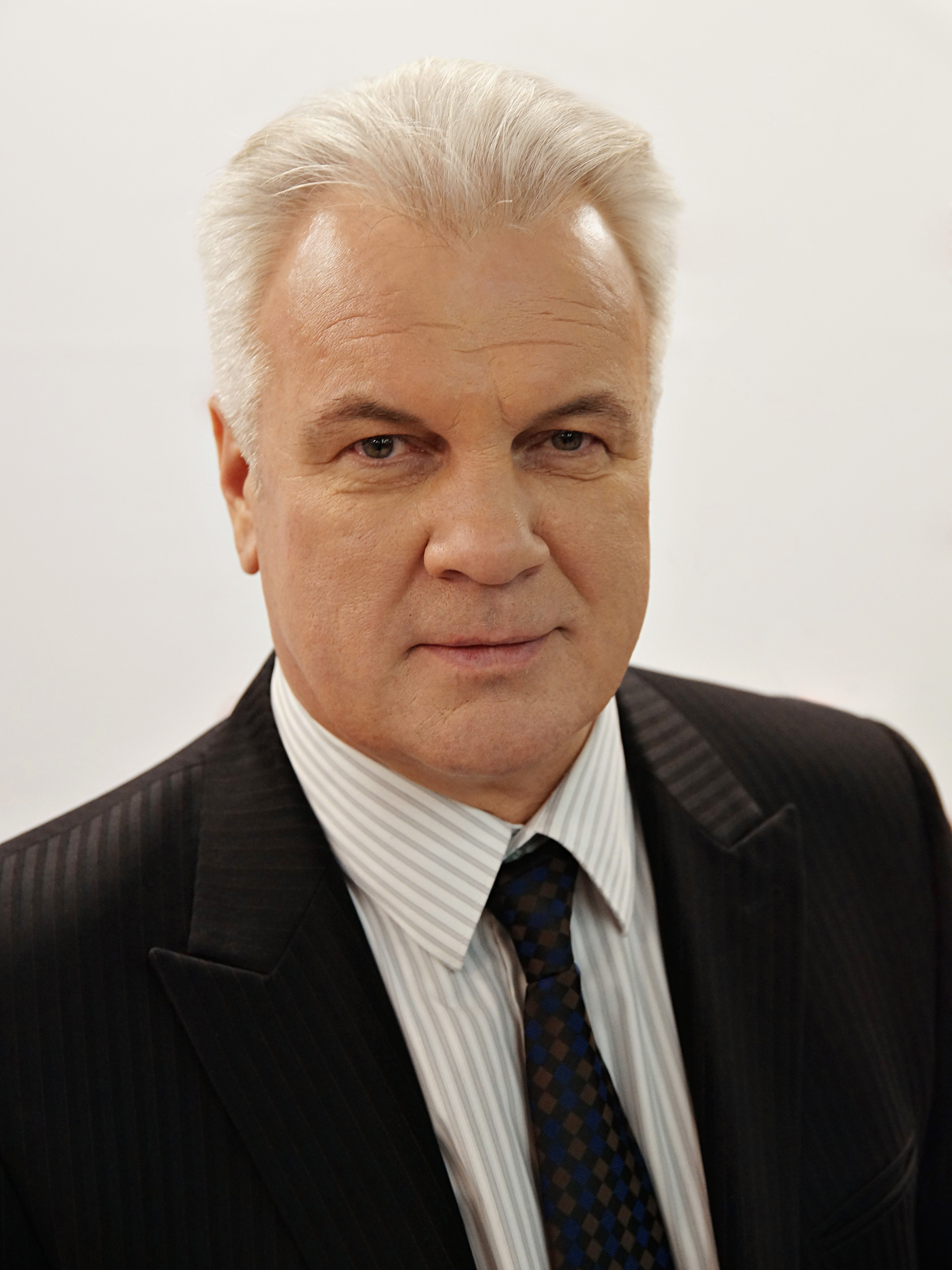
- Kotenyov in 2016
- Born: Anatoliy Vladimirovich Kotenyov; 25 September 1958 (age 67); Sukhumi, Abkhaz ASSR, Georgian SSR, Soviet Union
- Education: Moscow Art Theatre School
- Occupation: actor
- Years active: 1984-present

Anatoliy Vladimirovich Kotenyov (Russian: Анато́лий Влади́мирович Котенёв; born 1958) is a Russian/Belarusian actor. He began his screen career in 1985 and appeared in more than 120 Soviet, Russian, Belarusian and Ukrainian movies and TV series.

In 2022, he played the role of Boris Yeltsin in Season 5 of The Crown.

== Selected filmography ==
- Sailor Zheleznyak (1985) as Anatoli Zhelezniakov – Vitaliy Dudin
- Secret Fairway (1986–1987) as Shubin – Vadim Kostromenko
- Whose Are You, Old People? (1988) as Bukin – Iosif Kheifits
- Deja Vu (1990) as Vladimir Mayakovsky – Juliusz Machulski
- Sheriff's Star (1992) as Frank Angeli – Nikolai Litus
- Istanbul Transit (1993) as Viktor Zvyagin – Grigori Kokhan
- The Fourth Planet (1995) as Belyaev (voiced by Valery Kukhareshin) – Dmitry Astrakhan
- From Hell to Hell (1997) as episode – Dmitry Astrakhan
- Deserter (1997) as Igor Skvortsov – Yuriy Muzyka
- Contract with Death (1998) as general – Dmitry Astrakhan
- As Far as My Feet Will Carry Me (2001) as Kamenev – Hardy Martins
- Bless the Woman (2003) as colonel – Stanislav Govorukhin
- The Last Confession (2006) as Rykin – Sergei Lyalin
- The Apocalypse Code (2006) as FSB General – Vadim Shmelyov
- Break-through (2006) as Alexander Kazakov – Vitaliy Lukin
- Metro (2013) as Mayor of Moscow – Anton Megerdichev
- Voronin's Family (2015) as Pavel Galanov (series 341) – Alexander Zhigalkin
- The Age of Pioneers (2017) as Nikolai Kamanin – Dmitry Kiselyov
- The Humorist (2019) as general Yasenev – Mikhail Idov
- Papy (2022) as general – Karen Oganesyan and others
- The Crown (2022) as Boris Yeltsin – Christian Schwochow
- The Junior Team (2024) as Chairman of the Commission of the Interregional Hockey Federation – Andrey Silkin, Andrey Golovkov
