= Everything Will Be Fine =

Everything Will Be Fine may refer to:

- Everything Will Be Fine (1998 film) (Alles Wird Gut), a 1998 German film directed by Angela Maccarone
- Everything Will Be Fine (2010 film) (Alting bliver godt igen), a 2010 Danish film directed by Christoffer Boe
- Every Thing Will Be Fine, a 2015 German drama film directed by Wim Wenders
- Everything Will Be Fine!, a 1995 comedy film
- Everything Will Be Fine (TV series), a 2021 Mexican television series created by Diego Luna
