= Give Me Moonlight =

- Russian: Подари мне лунный свет
- Directed by: Dmitry Astrakhan
- Written by: Oleg Danilov
- Produced by: Mikhail Molotov; Igor Tolstunov; Mikhail Zilberman
- Starring: Natalya Andreychenko; Nikolai Yeremenko Jr.; Igor Dmitriev; Sergey Dreyden; Vladimir Gostyukhin
- Cinematography: Aleksandr Rud
- Music by: Dmitry Atovmyan
- Production company: Profit Film Studio
- Release date: March 1, 2001
- Running time: 89 min.
- Country: Russia
- Language: Russian

Give Me Moonlight (Russian: Подари мне лунный свет, romanized: Podari mne lunnyy svet) is a 2001 Russian comedy-drama film directed by Dmitry Astrakhan.

== Plot ==
Popular television journalist Sergei Kupriyanov has recently begun to make his own broadcast. But his success could not fill the void in his family relationships. His wife, Irina, is leaving for St. Petersburg, and in the meantime, he is having an affair with his colleague Lena. Suddenly, Irina returns home and now Sergey has to make a difficult choice.

== Cast ==
- Natalya Andreychenko as Irina Kupriyanov
- Nikolai Yeremenko Jr. as Sergei Kupriyanov
- Igor Dmitriev as Eduard Sorokin
- Sergey Dreyden as Pyotr Semyonovich Mankin, prophet
- Vladimir Gostyukhin as Sergei Petrov
- Raisa Ryazanova as Lydia Petrovna
- Olesya Sudzilovskaya as Lena
- Olga Sutulova as Sergei's and Irina's daughter
- Oleg Tabakov as cameo
- Aleksandr Efremov as Vladimir Fyodorovich
