= Alexander Slastin =

Soviet and Russian actor

- Born: 12 June 1942 (age 84); Ulan-Ude, RSFSR, USSR
- Occupation: Actor
- Years active: 1961–present
- Organization: Leningrad Music Hall
- Notable work: Der Untergang
- Honours: Merited Artist of the Russian Federation

Alexander Vladimirovich Slastin (Russian: Александр Владимирович Сластин; born 12 June 1942) is a Soviet and Russian actor.

== History ==
Alexander Slastin was born on 12 June 1942 in Ulan-Ude in the USSR. After the war ended, his family moved to Ukraine, where he had to undergo an awful famine.

Before Slastin started acting in movies, he worked in 1961 as a trained actor in many theatre groups in the Soviet Union. In 1968, Slastin became a member of the Leningrad Music Hall. In 1969, he made his screen debut, playing Prince Galitsky in the opera Prince Igor.

At the beginning of Slastin's acting career, he worked in many Russian film productions. From the start of the 1990s, he got jobs for other language areas. His first non-Russian film was the 1991 German TV film Die junge Katharina. He also starred in the Italian film Lo conosciuto.

The most well-known film that Slastin worked in is the 2004 film Downfall, in which he played Soviet general Vasily Chuikov.

In 2005, he earned the honorary title of the Merited Artist of the Russian Federation.

As of now, Slastin lives in Saint Petersburg.

== Filmography ==
Year	Title	Role	Notes
1969	Prince Igor	Galitsky	
1978	Yuliya Vrevskaya	episode	
1981	Floria Tosca	Mario Cavaradossi	
1985	Morning of the Doomed Mine	Nikolay Lange	
1987	A Man from the Boulevard des Capucines	Fest's companion	
1987	Is Not Subject to Publicity	Nikolay Nikolaev	
1988	Once Lies	Colonel	
1989	Corruption	Potapov, KGB colonel	
1990	The Eternal Husband	Pogoreltsev	
1990	New Scheherazade	Shakh	
1991	Young Catherine	Prussian Major Domo	TV movie
1991	Anna Karamazoff	episode	
1991	Death Bay	Anatoli Lensky	
1991	Sokrat	Creon	
1991	Take Action, Manya!	Coordinator - head of the mafia	
1991	The Shore of Salvation	Myakota	
1992	Putana	major of militsiya	
1993	Strange Men of Semyonova Ekaterina	Nikolay Alimov	
1993	You Are My Only Love	mayor's office representative	
1993	Lo Sconosciuto	Lo Sconosciuto	
1993	Sin. Passion Story	Karpov	
1995	Everything Will Be Fine!	policeman	
1996	The Successor	Consulate General	
1997	Strong as Death Love	episode	
2003	Bandit Petersburg 4	Vadim Petrovich Goncharov	TV series
2004	Downfall	Vasily Chuikov	
2005	The Master and Margarita	Count Robert	miniseries
2008	Street Racers	Chief of Traffic Police	
2008	Adrenaline: One Against All	Sergei Gorsky	TV series
2011	Elena	general	
2019	Guardian of the Fatherland	Mikhail Vavilov	TV series
