= Yuri Vorontsov =

Soviet cinematographer

Yuri Vorontsov Юрий Воронцов
- Born: Yuri Pavlovich Vorontsov; 23 March 1937; Leningrad, RSFSR, USSR
- Died: 20 December 2002 (aged 65); Saint Petersburg, Russia
- Other names: Jurij Woronzow; Juri Woronzow
- Occupation: cinematographer

Yuri Pavlovich Vorontsov (Russian: Юрий Павлович Воронцов; 23 March 1937 – 20 December 2002) was a Soviet cinematographer. His film credits include 1993's You Are My Only Love and the 1996 German film Hölle zu Hölle (From Hell to Hell).

Honored Artist of Russia (1994).

== Filmography ==
| Year | Title | Alternate title |
|---|---|---|
| 1998 | Contract with Death | |
| 1996 | From Hell to Hell | Von Hölle zu Hölle (Germany) |
| 1995 | Fourth Planet | |
| 1996 | Everything Will Be Fine! | (Note: International English informal literal title) |
| 1994 | Rains in the Ocean | |
| 1993 | You Are My Only Love | Ты у меня одна (Russia) |
| 1991 | Izydi | Get Thee Out |
| 1991 | Satan | |
| 1989 | Koma | |
| 1988 | Difficult First Hundred Years | |
| 1987 | Temptation | |
| 1986 | Payment for Travel | |
| 1985 | Gunpowder | |
| 1984 | Once a Doctor | |
| 1980 | A Reed in the Wind | TV |
| 1979 | The Wife Has Left | |
| 1977 | Love at First Sight (Note: International English literal title) | Любовь с первого взгляда (Russian title) |
| 1976 | Always With Me | |
