= You Are My Only Love =

- Russian: Ты у меня одна
- Directed by: Dmitry Astrakhan
- Written by: Dmitry Astrakhan; Oleg Danilov
- Produced by: Galina Alekseyeva; Arkadi Tulchin
- Starring: Aleksandr Zbruyev; Mark Goronok; Marina Neyolova; Mariya Lobachova; Svetlana Ryabova
- Cinematography: Yuri Vorontsov
- Edited by: Nina Dushenkova; V. Rubanov; N. Viktorova
- Music by: Aleksandr Pantykin
- Production company: Lenfilm
- Release date: 1993
- Running time: 101 min.
- Country: Russia
- Language: Russian

You Are My Only Love (Russian: Ты у меня одна, romanized: Ty u menya odna) is a 1993 Russian drama film directed by Dmitry Astrakhan.

== Plot ==
In the prologue, a young girl leaves for the U.S., harboring an unrequited love for her older brother’s friend, whom she affectionately calls “Uncle Zhenya”. Twenty years later, that friend, Yevgeny Timoshin, is a former boxer now working as a modest engineer in Saint Petersburg. Yevgeny lives with his wife, Natasha, a sexologist, and their daughter, Olya, in a cramped apartment. He moonlights as a grocery store loader to make ends meet, while his elderly father, a former sailor, begs in the metro, cheerful despite his circumstances. Unbeknownst to Yevgeny, his childhood admirer, Anna, has become a successful businesswoman in the U.S. and returns to Russia for a business trip. Soon after, Yevgeny’s design bureau announces a joint venture with an American firm, and Yevgeny and his colleagues compete for limited roles. At home, Yevgeny and Natasha excitedly dream about moving to the U.S., envisioning a brighter future.

The next day, Anna appears as the American firm’s representative, startling Yevgeny, who hadn’t realized she was his “little” Anya. Surprised, Anna initially ignores him, leaving Yevgeny disheartened. That night, after a tense family meal, Natasha insists that Yevgeny invite Anna over, sparking a fierce argument. As Natasha and Olya storm out, Yevgeny drinks alone—until Anna shows up, confessing her enduring feelings. They spend the night together, and Anna offers to bring him to the U.S., buying him a suit and making arrangements with his old friend, Alexei, now a U.S. executive. But as they drive to her hotel, Yevgeny sees Natasha, drunk and dancing on a boat, and insists on helping her home. The following morning, he chooses not to go with Anna, who, in despair, attempts suicide but is stopped by her guards. She leaves him with a bittersweet farewell, calling him “Uncle Zhenya” one last time. Reeling, Yevgeny returns home to the forgiveness and warmth of his family, while his father and neighbors gather outside, playing his favorite song. The film closes as Yevgeny, reminded of what truly matters, reaffirms his love for Natasha.

== Cast ==
- Aleksandr Zbruyev as Timoshin
  - Mark Goronok as Timoshin in youth
- Marina Neyolova as Natasha
  - Mariya Lobachova as Natasha in youth
- Svetlana Ryabova as Anya
  - Ksenia Morozova as Anya in childhood
- Maria Klenskaya as Olya
- Viktor Gogolev as father
- Irina Mazurkevich as Sinka
- Alexander Lykov as gay prostitute
- Alexander Slastin as mayor's office representative
- Aleksey Shevchenkov as student

== Awards ==
- Nika Award 1993: Best Actress (Marina Neyolova)

== Censorship ==
In 2025, Russian television was forced to cut a scene from a film featuring a gay prostitute played by actor Alexander Lykov due to the Russian anti-LGBTQ law.
