= The Film About Alekseyev =

- Film poster
- Russian: Кино про Алексеева
- Directed by: Mikhail Segal
- Written by: Mikhail Segal
- Produced by: Natalya Mokritskaya; Ulyana Saveleva
- Starring: Aleksandr Zbruyev; Aleksey Kapitonov; Tatyana Mayst; Kseniya Radchenko; Darya Gutsul
- Cinematography: Eduard Moshkovich
- Music by: Mikhail Segal
- Release date: 2014
- Country: Russia
- Language: Russian

The Film About Alekseyev (Russian: Кино про Алексеева, romanized: Kino pro Alekseyeva) is a 2014 Russian drama film directed by Mikhail Segal.

== Plot ==
The film tells about a man who drank tea with Tarkovsky, got into the KGB because of Gagarin, competed with Kalashnikov and Vysotsky and suddenly learns about the trace that he left in the fate of the people around him.

== Cast ==
- Aleksandr Zbruyev as Alekseyev
- Aleksey Kapitonov as young Alekseyev
- Tatyana Mayst as Arkhipova
- Kseniya Radchenko
- Darya Gutsul
- Anastasiya Popkova as Asya, Alekseyev's wife
- Denis Fomin as Sasha, Alekseyev's friend
- Svetlana Pervushina as Lika, Sasha's wife
- Maksim Vinogradov
- Andrey Makarevich
