= Russkiye pesni =

Studio album by Alexander Gradsky
- Released: 1980
- Recorded: 1976–1979
- Genres: Progressive folk; folk rock
- Length: 37:05
- Language: Russian
- Label: Melodiya
- Producer: Alexander Gradsky

Alexander Gradsky chronology
Romans o vlyublyonnykh (1974)	Russkiye pesni (1980)	Sama zhizn (1984)

Russkiye pesni (Russian: Русские песни; transl. Russian songs), subtitled Syuita na temy narodnykh pesen (Russian: Сюита на темы народных песен; transl. Folk Songs Suite), is a studio album by Russian singer-songwriter Alexander Gradsky released in 1980 through Melodiya. It was the first full-length rock record officially released in the Soviet Union. The album is a conceptual one and consists of Russian folk songs in a modern rock treatment.

The album was recorded with the participation of Gradsky's musical band Skoromorokhi.

== Background ==
The idea of recording this album came to Alexander Gradsky in 1976, when, as a student of the Moscow Conservatory, he participated in recording and decoding works of Russian folklore. The first five tracks of the album were recorded in 1976, the final three in 1979.

The music and lyrics of most of the songs are traditional; Gradsky prepared arrangements of all the compositions, as well as completed the last verse in the "Tanya belaya". In addition, the album included the revolutionary song "Vy zhertvoyu pali", written at the end of the XIX century by Anton Amosov; when recording, an instrumental fragment was added to the end of the song.

The synthesizer Synthi 100, brought to the USSR by Peter Zinovieff, the creator of EMS, was widely used in the recording of the album.

== Critical reception ==
Writer and journalist Vasiliy Golovanov, on the pages of Yunost magazine in March 1985, named the album among the most significant domestic works that managed to "squeeze out" English-language rock.

In a retrospective review for Colta, Denis Boyarinov stated that Gradsky does not try to fit a folk song to rock and roll schemes, does not engage in stylization and ornamentation. He leaves the authentic elements inherent in the folk song style—unusual musical dimensions, free-floating accents, archaic words, but at the same time boldly reshapes melodies, treating the ancient song as his own, or, overcome by compositional ambitions and inspired by the studio experiments of the Beatles and George Martin, inserts quotes from Bach, Stravinsky and "Farewell of Slavianka", references to Chaliapin, Lemeshev and musique concrète.

Meduza magazine included the song "Tanya Belaya" in the list of 13 important songs performed by Gradsky.

== Track listing ==
Side A
No.	Title	Length
1.	"Nichto v polyushke" ("Nothing Is Swaying in the Field")	4:34
2.	"Daryu platok (Stradaniya)" ("I Present a Kerchief (Laments)")	2:33
3.	"Tanya Belaya (Khorovod-tanok)" ("Tanya, Tanyusha (A Round Dance)")	3:11
4.	"Plach" ("Lament")	2:09
5.	"Na Ivana Kupala" ("On St. John's Night")	4:19
Total length:		16:46

Side B
No.	Title	Length
1.	"Ne odna vo pole dorozhenka" ("There're Many Paths in the Field")	7:59
2.	"Soldatskaya" ("Soldiers Song")	5:16
3.	"Vy zhertvoyu pali" ("You've Fallen Victims")	7:04
Total length:		20:19

== Personnel ==
- Alexander Gradsky – vocals, synthesizer, guitar, piano, celesta, drums, bells, percussion
- Yuri Ivanov – bass guitar, harmonica
- Vladimir Vasilkov – percussion
- Sergey Zenko – flute, pipe, saxophone
- Skoromorokhi – backing band

Credits are adapted from the album's liner notes.

== Charts ==
=== Monthly charts ===
Monthly chart performance for Russkiye pesni
Chart (1981)	Peak position
Soviet Albums (Moskovskij Komsomolets)	2

=== Year-end charts ===
Year-end chart performance for Russkiye pesni
Chart (1981)	Peak position
Soviet Albums (Moskovskij Komsomolets)	7
