= Crossroads (1998 film) =

- Russian: Перекрёсток
- Directed by: Dmitry Astrakhan
- Written by: Oleg Danilov
- Produced by: Mikhail Moskalyov; Leonid Yarmolnik
- Starring: Leonid Yarmolnik; Anna Legchilova
- Cinematography: Aleksandr Rud
- Music by: Andrey Makarevich
- Production company: Belarusfilm
- Release date: December 25, 1998
- Running time: 105 min.
- Countries: Russia; Belarus
- Language: Russian

Crossroads (Russian: Перекрёсток, romanized: Perekryostok) is a 1998 Russian/Belarusian romantic film directed by Dmitry Astrakhan.

== Plot ==
The film tells about the participants of the once successful rock band Uncle Alik, who now work part-time at weddings, in the club and underpass. And suddenly the leader of the group Alik meets an old friend who offers to arrange a concert in America.

== Cast ==
- Leonid Yarmolnik as Oleg 'Alik' Sevastyanov
- Anna Legchilova as Lyalya
- Aleksandr Efremov as Misha
- Olga Samoshina as Natasha
- Olga Belyayeva as Lusya
- Viktoriya Ershova as girl

== Soundtrack ==
- Overture — Andrey Makarevich
- Crossroads — Makarevich
- Where is it Worn — Makarevich
- We Will Be Together — Makarevich
- Let Me Go — Makarevich
- By Appointment — Makarevich
- We'll be Together — instrumental
- Crossroads — Yuri Ilchenko
- Where is it Now — Ilchenko
- We Will Be Together Your — Ilchenko
- Let Me Go — Ilchenko
- By Appointment — Ilchenko
- Coda
