= Michael Idov =

Latvian-American writer (born 1976)

Michael Idov (Michael Mark Zilberman) is a Latvian-American novelist, screenwriter and director. His works include films Leto (Cannes Main Competition, 2018) and The Humorist, German television series Deutschland 89, and novels Ground Up and The Collaborators.

== Biography ==
=== Family and early years ===
Michael Idov was born in Riga, Latvia, in 1976, to Jewish parents Mark Zilberman and Yelena Zilberman née Idov. His family immigrated into the U.S. as refugees in 1992, and were naturalized in 1998. After graduating from the University of Michigan with a BFA in Dramatic Writing and Film and Video Studies, Idov moved to New York City to start his writing career. His journalistic work, mostly for New York Magazine, garnered three National Magazine Awards and was featured in The Best American Magazine Writing collection. His 2009 debut novel, Ground Up, became an unexpected bestseller in Russia in the author's own self-translation, and in 2012, Idov moved to Moscow to work as the editor in chief of GQ Russia. He quit the job and left Russia shortly after the annexation of Crimea in 2014; the experience formed the basis of his 2018 memoir, Dressed Up for a Riot.

=== Private life ===
Idov lives in Berlin and Los Angeles with wife and frequent screenwriting collaborator Lily and daughter Vera.

== Bilingualism ==
Idov writes in English and Russian, mostly keeping the two bodies of work separate and using the name "Mikhail Idov" (Михаил Идов) for his Russian-language output. In 2009, he became the first Anglophone writer since Vladimir Nabokov to republish a novel in a Russian self-translation. Idov's unusual approach to transligualism and identity, which essentially involves maintaining two personas, has attracted some academic attention and analysis, with one researcher, Dr. Adrian Wanner, noting his "refus[al] to openly play the 'Russian card,' the 'Jewish card,' or the 'immigrant card'." However, in 2022, responding to Russia's invasion of Ukraine, Idov announced that he will not be writing in Russian as long as Vladimir Putin remains in power.

== Books ==
Year	Title	Publisher	Notes
2009	Ground Up	Farrar, Straus & Giroux	novel
2009	Кофемолка (The Coffee Grinder)	Corpus	Self-translation of Ground Up
2011	Made In Russia: Unsung Icons of Soviet Design	Rizzoli	essay collection, edited by
2013	Чёс (The Gig)	Corpus	Collection of original Russian short stories
2018	Dressed Up for a Riot	Farrar, Straus & Giroux	memoir
2024	The Collaborators	Scribner	novel
2026	The Cormorant Hunt	Scribner	novel, sequel to The Collaborators

== Filmography ==
=== Film ===
Year	English title	Original title	Writer	Director
2015	Soulless 2	Духлесс 2	yes	no
2018	The Humorist	Юморист	yes	yes
2018	Leto	Лето	yes	no
2021	Jetlag	Джетлаг	yes	yes

=== Television ===
Year	English title	Original title	Creator/Showrunner
2015	Londongrad	Лондонград	yes
2017	The Optimists	Оптимисты	yes
2020	Deutschland 89		no
