= Deeper! =

Russian sex comedy

- Theatrical release poster
- Directed by: Mikhail Segal
- Written by: Mikhail Segal
- Produced by: Anastasiya Kavunovskaya; Andrey Kretov; Aleksandr Kushaev; Grigory Akopian
- Starring: Aleksandr Pal; Lyubov Aksyonova; Oleg Gaas; Ekaterina Sokolova; Igor Ugolnikov; Igor Vernik
- Cinematography: Eduard Moshkovich; Yevgeny Ermolenko
- Edited by: Mikhail Segal
- Production companies: Bubblegum Production; Kinoprime Foundation; Kinofon LLC; Okko Studios
- Distributed by: Columbia Pictures (though Sony Pictures Releasing; Russia); Netflix (International)
- Release date: October 22, 2020 (Russia)
- Running time: 109 minutes
- Country: Russia
- Languages: Russian; English
- Box office: ₽72 million; $1.014.750

Deeper! (Russian: Глубже!, romanized: Glubzhe!) is a 2020 Russian sex comedy-drama film written and directed by Mikhail Segal. The film tells about a young director who forced all the figures in the porn industry to play by his own rules, the film stars Aleksandr Pal, Lyubov Aksyonova, and Oleg Gaas.

It was theatrically released in Russia on October 22, 2020, by Sony Pictures Productions and Releasing (SPPR).

== Plot ==
The young theater director Roman Petrovich, due to his exactingness to the depth of the study of roles, misses the deadlines for the release of an important performance at the Main Theater of the Country and finds himself without a job. To earn a living, he takes on any job and one day replaces his friend at a part-time job: the director of a porn video.

Roman Petrovich takes his responsibility very serious. As result, he succeeds in bringing the porn actors Lera and Timur fully into the performance, and the resulting film becomes a resounding success. Its success earns him a permanent contract with an underground adult film studio.

The subsequent films featuring Lera and Timur, all directed by Roman Petrovich, introduce a new genre, "deep Russian porn". The films are profitable for the studio's owner, and Roman Petrovich gains international recognition as the genre's pioneer.

The success of the young director is noticed by the President of the Country and invites him to fix things on the Main TV Channel of the Country, where the unlucky TV presenter Vladimir is rapidly losing the trust of viewers. Roman Petrovich, with the help of a deep study of the role, restores Vladimir's self-confidence, the trust of the audience and the rating. Success with Vladimir allows the Minister of Culture of the Country, with the consent of the President, to appoint Roman Petrovich as the artistic director of the Main Theater of the Country instead of the unsuccessful retrograde that once fired Roman Petrovich. Roman leaves the porn studio with regret and says goodbye to his troupe.

Carte blanche from the leadership of the Country and experience in porn allow Roman Petrovich to rethink the activities of the Main Theater of the Country as the highest form of the porn industry and put on a play, the premiere of which is attended by the President and heads of foreign states. Instead of the titled actors, Lera and Timur appear on the stage at the end of the performance and break the applause of the audience with their performance.

== Cast ==
- Aleksandr Pal as Roman Petrovich, a director
- Lyubov Aksyonova as Lera, a student, and a pornographic actress
- Oleg Gaas as Timur, a pornographic actor
- Ekaterina Sokolova as Ira, actress of the Main Theater, Roman's lover
- Igor Ugolnikov as Russian President
- Igor Vernik as cultural adviser / minister of culture
- Semyon Treskunov as Pasha, a porn business owner
- Denis Vasilyev as Andrey, a director, Roman's friend
- Sergey Burunov as Vladimir, TV presenter of the Main TV channel
- Anton Lapenko as Khachatryan, fashion director
- Vladimir Simonov as stage actor
- Vladimir Steklov as theatre artistic director

== Production ==
The film received neutral and favorable reviews from Russian-speaking critics. The reviewers noted the excellent acting work of Aleksandr Pal, who plays the main role and essentially holds the entire film. Some critics positively assessed the exact parodic images of both types and personalities of the modern Russian theatrical, television and film industry, while noting that the director nowhere crosses the border of benevolent irony.

Despite the provocative plot, the film received a 16+ rating, and the director himself said about the exclusion of explicit scenes: "This is the trick of our film: the story of the adventures of a porn film crew can be watched by the whole family, and no one will have to blush or turn pale."

Principal photography tapes were held in Moscow, Yaroslavl and Saint Petersburg.

== Release ==
Deeper! was theatrically released in the Russian Federation on October 22, 2020, by Sony Pictures Productions and Releasing (SPPR).
