= Northern Lights (2001 film) =

- Russian: Северное сияние
- Directed by: Andrey Razenkov
- Written by: Natalya Kotkova; Andrey Razenkov
- Produced by: Vasili Emelyanov; Mariya Orlyanskaya; Erik Waisberg
- Starring: Marina Aleksandrova; Aleksandr Zbruyev; Irina Apeksimova; Elena Koreneva; Daniil Strakhov; Mikhail Ulyanov
- Cinematography: Masha Solovyova
- Edited by: Olga Grinshpun
- Music by: Adrian Korchinsky
- Release date: 2001
- Country: Russia
- Language: Russian

Northern Lights (Russian: Северное сияние) is a 2001 Russian romantic drama film directed by Andrey Razenkov.

The film tells about a girl who lives without a father whom she has never seen, but whom sincerely loves. After twenty years of waiting, she sets off in search of him.

== Plot ==
Twenty-year-old Anya (Marina Alexandrova) lives with her mother (Elena Koreneva) in Saint Petersburg. Just before her wedding, she decides to find her father, whom she has never met. Her mother tells her that Anya's father works as a doctor in the capital.

Anya travels to Moscow, where she meets Dr. Sergey Anatolyevich (Alexander Zbruev) at a clinic. Based on her mother's description, she suspects he could be her father. Anya grows close to Sergey, as well as his father and former lover, Natalia, who becomes jealous of Anya. After an accident leaves Natalia on her deathbed, Anya confesses to her that she is Sergey’s daughter. Unable to resist, Anya falls for Sergey, who is in his fifties, and later writes him a confession letter that she never delivers. She then leaves for home with her fiancé.

On her wedding day, Anya's mother surprises her, announcing that she has found Anya’s father, who arrives with a bouquet of flowers. However, this man is a stranger to Anya. Shocked, Anya flees her home in her wedding dress, running barefoot through the streets of Saint Petersburg in search of happiness. Her distraught mother confesses to her partner that she does not know who Anya’s real father is, as he is one of several men who assaulted her years ago. Meanwhile, Anya boards the "Northern Lights" train back to Moscow to reunite with Sergey, unaware that he is on a train heading to see her, and the two pass each other in transit—this scene opens the film.

== Cast ==
- Marina Aleksandrova as Anya
- Aleksandr Zbruyev as Sergey / Anya's Father / Doctor
- Irina Apeksimova as Natalya
- Elena Koreneva as Anya's Mother
- Daniil Strakhov as Vadim / Anya's Fiancé
- Mikhail Ulyanov as Old man in the country house
