= An Ideal Husband (1980 film) =

- Russian: Идеальный муж
- Directed by: Viktor Georgiyev
- Written by: Viktor Georgiyev; Oscar Wilde
- Starring: Yury Yakovlev; Lyudmila Gurchenko; Anna Tveleneva; Elena Koreneva; Yevgeniya Khanayeva
- Cinematography: Fyodor Dobronravov
- Music by: Edison Denisov
- Release date: 1980
- Running time: 93 minute
- Country: Soviet Union
- Language: Russian

An Ideal Husband (Russian: Идеальный муж) is a 1980 Soviet comedy film directed by Viktor Georgiyev. It is the film adaptation of the 1895 Oscar Wilde play of the same name.

== Plot ==
The film tells about Sir Robert Chiltern, who was a promising politician, an ideal husband and man, but got involved in a dirty business. Will he be able to save his marriage?

== Cast ==
- Yury Yakovlev as Sir Robert Chiltern
- Lyudmila Gurchenko as Mrs. Laura Cheveley
- Anna Tvelenyova as Lady Gertrude Chiltern
- Elena Koreneva as Miss Mabel Chiltern
- Yevgeniya Khanayeva as Lady Markby
- Eve Kivi as Lady Basildon
- Alla Budnitskaya as Mrs. Margaret Marchmont
- Igor Dmitriev as Vicomte de Nanjac
- Boris Khimichev as Jabez Kariba
- Albert Filozov as Tommy Trafford

== Production team ==
- Screenwriter and director — Viktor Georgiyev
- Operator — Fyodor Dobronravov
- Artist — Konstantin Forostenko
- Costume artist — Ganna Ganevskaya
