= Tracker (1987 film) =

- Directed by: Roman Balayan
- Written by: Rustam Ibragimbekov; Roman Balayan
- Starring: Oleg Yankovsky; Yelena Safonova; Aleksandr Vokach
- Cinematography: Bogdan Verzhbitsky; Vasily Trushkovsky
- Edited by: Yelena Lukashenko
- Music by: Vadim Khrapachov
- Production company: Dovzhenko Film Studios
- Release date: 1987
- Running time: 83 minutes
- Country: Soviet Union
- Language: Russian

Tracker (Russian: Филёр) is a Soviet feature film, a war drama directed by Roman Balayan. The film was shot in 1987 in Kaluga.

== Plot ==
It's 1916, World War I, the premonition of the revolution. Vorobyov, a gymnasium teacher, retires from service in protest at the dismissal of revolutionary-minded teachers, although he does not share their views. He remains without means of subsistence – there is nothing to pay for a rented apartment, he has a sick child who needs to be treated in the Crimea. Vorobyov is looking for work, even the worst, just to pay money. The gendarmerie offers him to become a filer (spy, secret observer), cooperate with them and report all the unreliable people. Vorobyov faces a monstrous choice – or become a snitch, or remain an honest man without a livelihood. The impossibility of going out makes him commit suicide.

== Cast ==
- Oleg Yankovsky as Pyotr Vorobyov
- Yelena Safonova as Nastya, Vorobyov's wife
- Aleksandr Vokach as Head of the Gendarme Department
- Oleksiy Gorbunov as Lavrentiev, gendarme lieutenant
- Aleksandr Zbruyev as Yakov Pyatkin
- Olga Ostroumova as Nina
- Filipp Yankovsky as episode
- Aleksandr Abdulov as Vanya
- Bohdan Beniuk as Janitor
- Igor Gnevashev as episode

== Awards ==
- 1988 – Prize to Oleg Yankovsky for the best performance of the male role at the Seminci (Spain)
