= The Shore of Salvation =

1990 USSR-North Korean film

- Directed by: Arya Dashiyev; Ryu Ho Son
- Written by: Aleksei Timm; Arya Dashiyev; Li Jin Wu
- Starring: Dmitry Matveyev; Boris Nevzorov; Viktor Stepanov
- Cinematography: Pyotr Kataev
- Music by: Evgeny Ptichkin; Ra Guk
- Production companies: Gorky Film Studio; 8 February Film Studio
- Release date: 1990
- Running time: 134 minutes
- Countries: Soviet Union; North Korea
- Languages: Russian; Korean

The Shore of Salvation (Russian: Берег спасения, romanized: Bereg spaseniya, Korean: 구원의 기슭) is a 1990 USSR-North Korean two-part martial arts action film directed by Arya Dashiyev and Ryu Ho Son. Arya also co-wrote the script. The film describes the events of the Russo-Japanese War.

== Plot ==
The events unfold on the cruiser "Svetlana", one of the Russian ships that participated in the Russo-Japanese war. The cruiser is attacked. After the fire is over, the crew decides to flood the ship so that it does not get to the enemy. Only five sailors can survive. They arrive on Korean land and are sent to the Russian territory, on the way they face various dangers.

== Cast ==
- Dmitry Matveyev as Dyakonov
- Boris Nevzorov as Nikulin
- Viktor Stepanov as Father Fyodor
- Vitaly Serov as Oles
- Alexander Slastin as Myakota
- Lee Sol Hi as Barame
- Li Yong Ho as Yu Chun
- Cho Jae-Yong as elder
- Yun Chang as Kajio
- Zhu Sok Bon as Yam
- Kwak Men So as Harata
