= Olga Ponizova =

Russian theater and film actress (born 1974)

- Born: Olga Valerievna Ponizova; March 8, 1974 (age 52); Moscow, RSFSR, USSR
- Occupation: Actress
- Years active: 1989–present

Olga Valerievna Ponizova (Russian: Ольга Валерьевна Понизова; born March 8, 1974, Moscow) is a Russian theater and film actress.

== Biography ==
In 1995 she graduated from the Boris Shchukin Theatre Institute (workshop Alla Kazanskaya). There was a theater actress Moon Theater and Moscow Theater of Young Spectators.

== Personal life ==
She was married to TV presenter and television director Andrey Chelyadinov. In 1995 the couple had a son Nikita (died in an accident July 3, 2015).

== Filmography ==
- 1989 — Do Not Get Along as Panteleyeva
- 1993 — Sin. The Story of Passion as Nina
- 1995 — Everything Will Be Fine! as Olya
- 1998 — Waiting Room as Irina Sokolova
- 2002 — Bandit Petersburg: The Collapse of Antibiotic as Dasha
- 2002 — Two Fates as Svetlana
- 2002 — Landscape with Murder as Ksenia
- 2002 — Zazhigayka as Liza
- 2003 — I Decide Everything Myself: Dancing on the Waves as Inna Malakhova
- 2003 — I Decide Everything Myself 2: The Voice of the Heart as Inna Malakhova
- 2005 — Happy New Year, Papa! as Katya
- 2005 — Two Fates 2 as Svetlana Yusupova
- 2005 — Adventuress as Tanya Savicheva
- 2006 — On the Corner, at the Patriarch Ponds 4 as Anna
- 2007 — A Dozen of Justice as Zhanna Taranova
- 2007 — You'll Always Be with Me as Tamara
