= Aleksandr Zbruyev =

Soviet and Russian theatrical and cinema actor

Aleksandr Zbruyev PAR
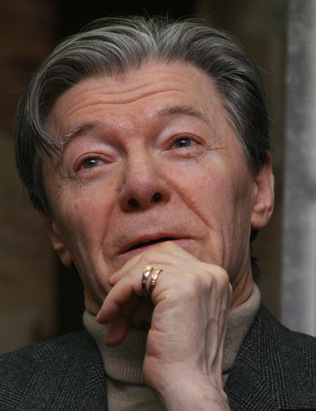
- Born: 31 March 1938 (age 88); Moscow, Soviet Union
- Occupation: actor
- Years active: 1961–present

Aleksandr Viktorovich Zbruyev (Russian: Александр Викторович Збруев, born 31 March 1938, Moscow, Soviet Union) is a Soviet and Russian theatrical and film actor.

== Selected filmography ==
- My Younger Brother (1962) as Dimka Denisov
- A Span of Earth (1964) as Aleksandr Motovilov
- Clean Ponds (1965) as Sergei
- Big School-Break (1972) as Grigoriy Ganzha
- A Lover's Romance (1974) as Igor Volgin
- Melodies of a White Night (1976) as Fyodor
- The House That Swift Built (1982) as Relb, Lilliputian
- Guard Me, My Talisman (1986) as Mitya
- Tracker (1987) as Yakov Pyatkin
- To Kill a Dragon (1988) as Friedrichsen
- Black Rose Is an Emblem of Sorrow, Red Rose Is an Emblem of Love (1989) as Ilya
- The Inner Circle (1991) as Stalin
- You Are My Only Love (1993) as Timoshin
- Maestro Thief (1994) as Vladimir Beletsky
- Everything Will Be Fine! (1995) as Konstantin Smirnov
- Poor Sasha (1997) as Beryozkin
- Northern Lights (2001) as Sergey
- Balakirev the Buffoon (2002) as Yaguzhinskiy
- The Film About Alekseyev (2014) as Alexeyev
- Gold Diggers (2019) as Pyotr Sergeevich
