= Yelena Koreneva =

Russian actress and director

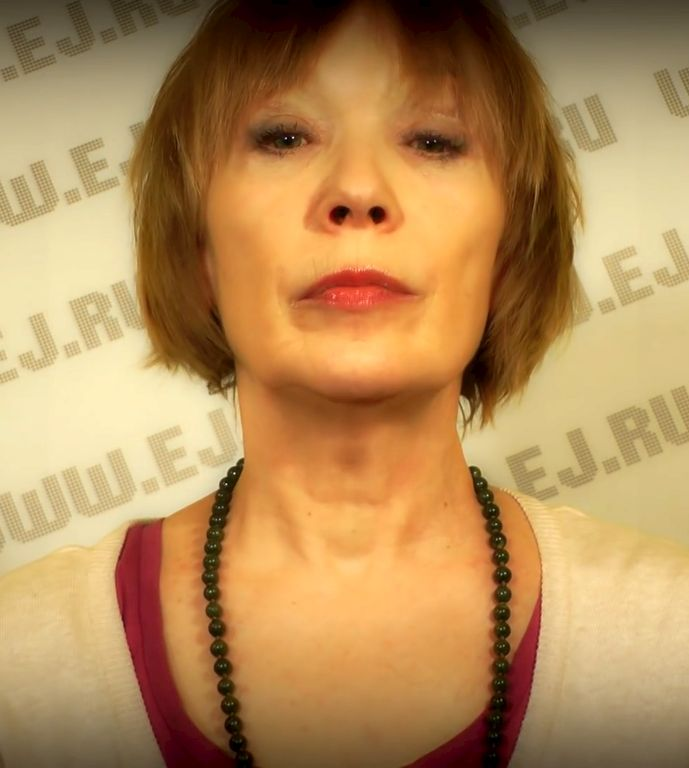
- Born: Yelena Alekseyevna Koreneva; October 3, 1953 (age 72); Moscow, RSFSR, Soviet Union
- Occupations: Actress, writer, film director, screenwriter
- Years active: 1970–present

Yelena Alekseyevna Koreneva (Russian: Еле́на Алексе́евна Ко́ренeва; born October 3, 1953, Moscow) is a Soviet and Russian stage and film actress, writer, film director, and screenwriter.

Yelena Koreneva starred in more than sixty pictures and authorizes three published books.

== Biography ==
=== Early life and education ===
Yelena Alekseyevna Koreneva was born on October 3, 1953, in Moscow, in a creative family. Her father, Aleksei Korenev, was a famous Soviet and Russian film director. Mother - Natalia Andreyevna Koreneva (Konstantinova), worked for many years as an assistant director at the Mosfilm studio.

In her childhood, Yelena dreamed of becoming a ballerina, but she was not admitted to a dance school. In 1969 she made her debut in film as Dunya Baburina by starring in her father's comedy film Taimyr Calls You. She graduated from school with an in-depth study of English.

After finishing school, she enrolled in the Boris Shchukin Theatre Institute on the course of Ludmila Vladimirovna Stavskaya. She graduated in 1975.

=== Career ===
In 1974, as a student, she played Tanya, the lead female role in Andrei Konchalovsky's film A Lover's Romance. This role brought the beginning actress popularity. Andrei Konchalovsky noted her physical likeness to American actress Shirley MacLaine, and even convinced her to imitate MacLaine. At the 1974 Karlovy Vary International Film Festival the picture was awarded the "Crystal Globe".

She graduated from the institute in 1975 with the role of Juliet in the successful diploma performance of Romeo and Juliet.

Between 1975 and 1977 she was an actress in the Moscow Sovremennik Theatre. Due to the invitation of Anatoly Efros, she transferred to the Moscow Drama Theater in Malaya Bronnaya, where she worked between 1977 and 1979.

In 1977, the actress played the lead role in the picture of Iosif Kheifits Asya based on the story of the same name by Ivan Turgenev. In 1978 Koreneva performed the main role in the historical film of Igor Maslennikov Yaroslavna, Queen of France. There were two significant works by Koreneva in 1979: Elizaveta Potapovna, the daughter of the usurer in the vaudeville of Svetlana Druzhinina Hussar's Matchmaking and Martha, the wife of the main character in Mark Zakharov's The Very Same Munchhausen.

One of her last works before leaving abroad was the role of Nurse Lyudochka in Mikhail Kozakov's film The Pokrovsky Gate (1982).

In June 1982, she married Kevin Moss, an American university teacher of Russian language and literature, and on September 15 she emigrated to the United States. She lived with her husband in academic towns, attended various educational courses, and studied French. She also worked at a cafeteria.

After divorcing her husband, she worked many different jobs, including as a waitress, cloakroom attendant, and in sales. Remaining a citizen of the USSR, she did not have the opportunity to visit her homeland for 3.5 years to meet her relatives, as the Soviet authorities refused her. To visit Moscow, having received the long-awaited permission, she succeeded only in the spring of 1986. In 1988–1989, the actress also came to the USSR and appeared in several Russian films.

During the 11-year emigration, she also starred in a number of American films (1984 - Beloved Mary, 1989 - Homer and Eddie, 1993 - Prisoner of Time) and began writing autobiographical prose.

In 1993 Yelena Koreneva returned to Russia. One of the first theatrical works of the actress on her return to Russia was the role of Lou Andreas-Salome in the solo performance Lu (and Fritz, and Rainer, and Professor), staged in 1994 by David George. In 1996 Yelena Koreneva acted in the play in English and in another direction at the theatrical festival in Perth in Australia (Festival of Perth).

In 1995-1997 she worked in the Stanislavsky Electrotheatre.

In 1999 she graduated from the High Courses for Scriptwriters and Film Directors. She shot two short films based on her scripts: "Chopin's Nocturne" and "Lusia and Grisha".

== Personal life ==
On the set of the film A Lover's Romance Koreneva became romantically involved with director Andrei Konchalovsky. Their relationship lasted three years, after which the pair parted.

In 1982, the actress married Kevin Moss, a teacher of Russian language and literature. They were married for a few years.

Her current life partner is Andrey Tashkov, also an actor.

== Filmography ==
- Monastery (2022) as Maria's grandmother
- Van Goghs (2018) as Irina
- Leto (2018) as woman in red
- Bessonnitsa (2013)(TV 2013-) as Aleksandra Alechina, bank's owner
- Stone (2012)
- Boris Godunov (2011) as episode
- Sobytie (2009) as Aunt Zhenya
- Landysh serebristyj (2005)
- Shpionskie igry: Nelegal (2004)
- Lyudi i teni. Film vtoroy: Opticheskiy obman (2003)
- The Eyeglasses (2002)
- Lednikoviy period (2002) (mini)
- Northern Lights (2001) as Anya's Mother
- S novym schastiem! - 2 (2000)
- Day of the Full Moon (1998) as Zoya
- Prisoner of Time (1993) as Chrystina Marr
- Anna Karamazoff (1991)
- Chernov/Chernov (1990)
- A Trap for Lonely Man (1990) as Doctor
- Homer and Eddie (1989)
- Komediya o Lisistrate (1989) as Lysistrata
- Maria's Lovers (1984) as Vera
- Krepysh (1982)
- The Pokrovsky Gate (1982) as Lyudochka
- Lenin in Paris (1981) as Singer (singing voice — Caroline Clerc)
- The mystery of Edwin Drood (1980) as Miss Rosa Bud
- An Ideal Husband (1980) as Miss Mabel Chiltern
- Siberiade (1979) as Taya Solomina
- Svatovstvo gusara (1979) as Liza
- Utrenniy obkhod (1979)
- Air Crew (1979) as Skvortsov's ex-girlfriend
- The Very Same Munchhausen (1979) as Marta
- Yaroslavna, Queen of France (1978) as Anna Yaroslavna
- Asya (1977) as Asya
- Sentimentalnyy roman (1976) as Zoya the little
- Vishnevii sad (1976) as Anya
- A Lover's Romance (1974) as Tanya
- Big School-Break (1972) as girl in library
- Taimyr Calls You (1970) as Dunya
