= The Humorist =

- Directed by: Michael Idov (as Mikhail Idov)
- Written by: Michael Idov (as Mikhail Idov)
- Produced by: Artemio Benki; Aija Berzina; Alise Gelze; Artyom Vasilev
- Starring: Alexey Agranovich; Yuri Kolokolnikov; Alisa Khazanova; Polina Aug; Artem Grigoryev
- Cinematography: Alexander Surkala
- Edited by: Michal Lánsky
- Music by: Leonid Desyatnikov; Alexey Sergunin
- Production companies: Metrafilms; Sirena Film; Tasse Film
- Release date: March 1, 2019
- Countries: Russia; Czech Republic; Latvia
- Language: Russian

The Humorist (Russian: Юморист, Jumorist) is a 2019 drama film directed and written by Michael Idov.

== Plot ==
The film is set in the mid-80s. In the center of the plot is a successful Soviet humorist Boris Arkadyev, who, despite universal love and recognition, lacks creative freedom, as a result of which he becomes dangerous for society.

== Cast ==
- Alexey Agranovich as Boris Arkadyev, a Jewish Soviet humorist
- Yuri Kolokolnikov as Maxim Shelepin
- Alisa Khazanova as Elvira, Arkadyev's wife
- Polina Aug as Lina
- Artem Grigoryev as K.G.B. agent
- Olga Dibtseva as Galina
- Anatoliy Kotenyov as general Yasenev
- Pavel Ilin as Budovsky, a concert manager
- Vilma Kutaviciute as Inara
- Semyon Shteynberg as Semyon Grinberg, a humorist
