= Vasiliy Golovanov =

Russian writer and photographer (1960–2021)

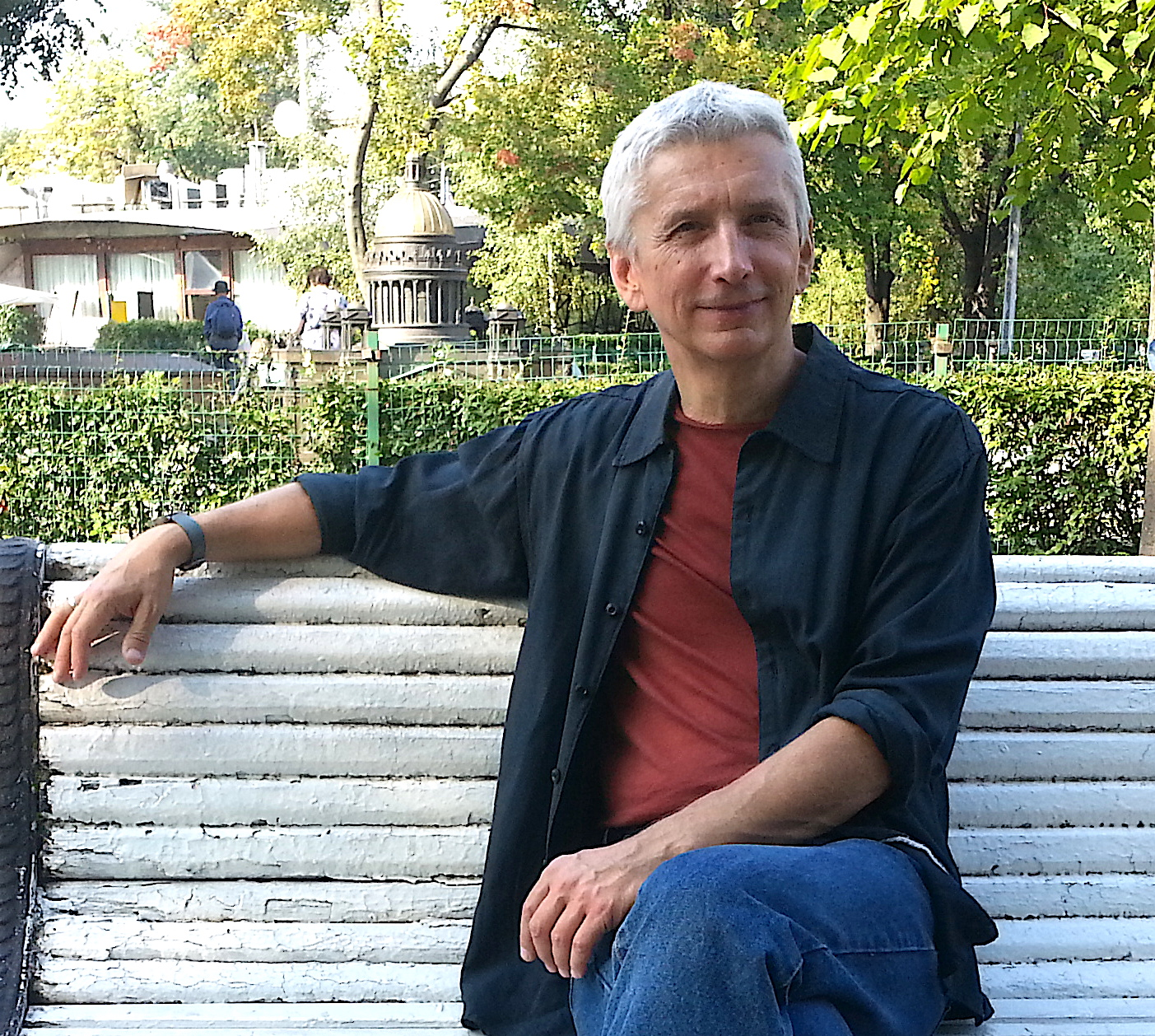
- Golovanov in 2018
- Born: 23 December 1960; Moscow, Russian SFSR, Soviet Union
- Died: 13 April 2021 (aged 60)
- Occupations: Writer; Photographer

Vasiliy Golovanov (23 December 1960 – 12 April 2021) was a Russian writer and photographer. He was the son of journalist and scientist Yaroslav Golovanov.

== Biography ==
Golovanov attended the Faculty of Journalism at Moscow State University and pursued an early journalistic career, having been published in the magazine Novy Mir. He then authored numerous novels, and received a nomination for the Yuri Kazakov Prize in 2004.

Vasiliy Golovanov died following a long illness on 12 April 2021, at the age of 60.

== Publications ==
- Éloge des voyages insensés (2008)
- Espaces et Labyrinthes (2013)
