= What Men Talk About. Continuation =

- Russian: О чём говорят мужчины. Продолжение
- Directed by: Flyuza Farkhshatova
- Starring: Leonid Barats; Aleksandr Demidov; Rostislav Khait; Kamil Larin; Mikhail Prokhorov
- Cinematography: Antoine Vivas Denisov
- Release date: February 22, 2018
- Country: Russia
- Language: Russian

What Men Talk About. Continuation (Russian: О чём говорят мужчины. Продолжение) is a 2018 Russian comedy film directed by Flyuza Farkhshatova.

== Plot ==
This time Lesha, Slava, Camille and Sasha go to St. Petersburg, and not all of them know why they are going there, but then they understand that it doesn't matter. The main thing is that they may not think for some time about the unresolved problems left at home. A lot of exciting adventures await the characters along the way.

== Cast ==
- Leonid Barats as Lyosha
- Aleksandr Demidov as Sasha
- Rostislav Khait as Slava
- Kamil Larin as Kamil
- Mikhail Prokhorov
