= Alexander Gradsky =

Russian rock singer (1949–2021)

Alexander Gradsky Александр Градский PAR
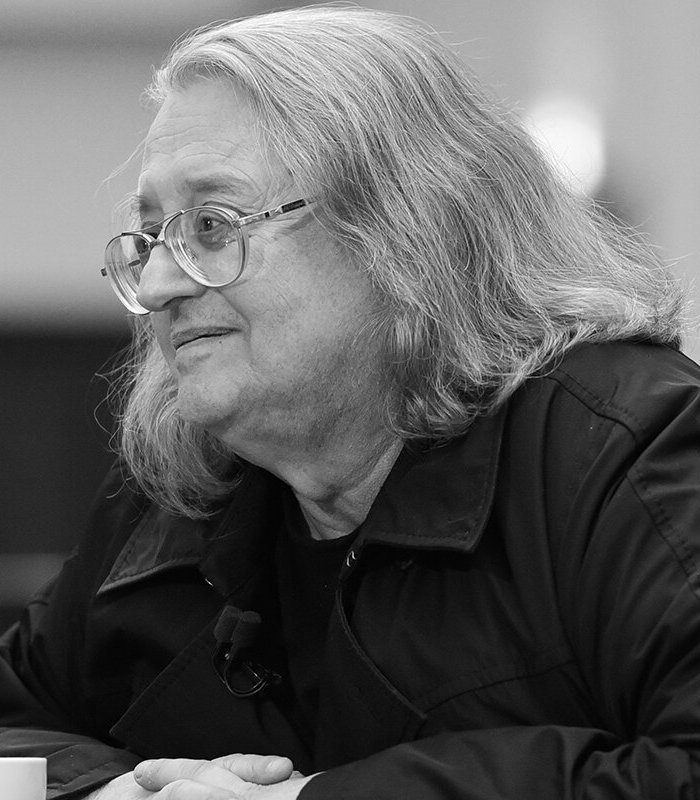
- Gradsky in 2019

Background information
- Born: Alexander Borisovich Fradkin; 3 November 1949; Kopeysk, Russian SFSR, Soviet Union
- Died: 28 November 2021 (aged 72) Moscow, Russia
- Genres: Rock; Bard music; classical; folk; blues
- Occupations: Singer; songwriter; musician; vocal teacher
- Instruments: Vocals; keyboards; guitar; bass; violin; drums
- Years active: 1963–2021
- Labels: Melodiya; Music1; Victor Musical Industries; MTKMO; Moroz Records; Creative Media; Believe Digital; Gradsky Kholl
- Formerly of: Slaviane; Los Panchos; Skify; Skomorokhi; John Denver; Cyndee Peters
Alexander Gradsky

Alexander Borisovich Gradsky (Russian: Алекса́ндр Бори́сович Гра́дский; born Alexander Borisovich Fradkin, 3 November 1949 – 28 November 2021) was a Russian rock singer, bard, multi-instrumentalist and composer.

He was one of the earliest performers of rock music in Russia. His diverse repertoire included rock 'n' roll, traditional folk songs performed with a rock twist, and operatic arias. He composed two rock operas and numerous songs including soundtrack music for several films and cartoons.

== Early life and musical beginnings ==
Alexander Gradsky was born on 3 November 1949 in the Russian city of Kopeysk, into a family of mixed Jewish and Russian origin. His father Boris Fradkin was an engineer working in a factory, and his mother Tamara was an actress. His mother encouraged him to learn to play the violin as a child, and her brother, Boris Gradsky, Alexander Gradsky's uncle, was a dancer who toured abroad with the famous Moiseev dance group and brought home records of Western music artists including Elvis Presley, Louis Armstrong and Little Richard. Such music was not ordinarily available in Soviet Russia at that time.

By the age of 12, Gradsky was singing Elvis Presley songs and accompanying himself on guitar. In 1963, at the age of 13, he sang with a Polish student band called Tarakany (Тараканы – The Cockroaches) in a concert at the International Club of Moscow State University. This is believed to have been the first public performance of rock 'n' roll by any Russian musician.

== Other bands ==
In the mid-1960s, Gradsky joined the band Slaviane (Славяне – The Slavs) as lead singer. The band's repertoire consisted almost entirely of Beatles and Rolling Stones covers. In 1966–1967, he was working with three bands: Slaviane, Los Panchos and Skify (Скифы – The Scythians). However, he found himself disagreeing with his Slaviane bandmates over the direction the band should take. Gradsky wanted to perform original rock songs in his native Russian language, whereas the other band members did not think that such endeavours could be successful and wanted to continue performing imported songs.

Gradsky consequently decided to form his own band, Skomorokhi (Скоморохи – The Jesters or The Buffoons) in 1967. His band became popular playing original Russian songs, as Gradsky blended elements of Western rock music with the lyric-centred, folk-influenced Russian bard music which was popular around that time. He enrolled in Gnesins Academy of Music in 1969, and continued to perform with Skomorokhi while a student. A successful performance at the Soviet pop-rock festival Silver Strings was followed with airplay and record deals.

== Solo career ==
In 1971, David Tukhmanov invited Gradsky to record some vocal parts for his debut LP Kak prekrasen mir (Как прекрасен мир – How Beautiful is the World). Gradsky performed two songs, one of which, "Zhil-byl Ya" (Жил-был я – Once upon a time I was), got critical acclaim. In 1973, film director Andrei Konchalovsky asked Alexander Gradsky to compose and perform music for the film "A Lover's Romance", which was released in 1974, the same year in which Gradsky graduated with a master's degree in vocal performance. Gradsky performed all the male vocal parts in the film soundtrack, which brought him fame as a solo artist. His many records released during his long career encompass a variety of genres. His first rock opera, Stadion (Стадион – Stadium), dedicated to the memory of Víctor Jara, was released as a double LP in 1985. He also composed a rock ballet Chelovek (Человек – The Man), released in 1988.

Gradsky was a tenor who is reported to have a three-and-a-half octave vocal range, and also played 12 instruments. He performed the demanding role of the Astrologer in Rimsky-Korsakov's opera The Golden Cockerel (Золотой Петушок – Zolotoy Petushok) in Moscow's Bolshoi Theatre in 1988.

— You are from Russia, nice to meet you (looks quite apprehensively).
What did you like the most from the concert?
— I liked the concert very much, and most of all I liked the piece
with variable sizes: 7/8, 9/8 and 11/8. Like in Russian music.
— Yes, like Stravinsky.
— Yes, as in "The Rite of Spring".
— Yes, as in the third part.
— Yes, in allegro.
— I know who you are and what you are worth.

— A conversation with Sting, from the book "Alexander Gradsky. The Voice"

In the 80s, Gradsky returned to the writing a poetry and creating social-themed songs. He formed a concert program in the "singer-songwriter" style. He participated in the organization of a number of Soviet rock festivals such as Rock-panorama. He also worked as a host of "Alexander Gradsky's hit-parade" show on radio "Yunost" showing near 107 artists from different genres (artists like Alexander Bashlachev, Yuri Shevchuk, Victor Tsoy, Konstantin Kinchev, Dmitriy Malikov, Vladimir Presnyakov Jr. got their first radio broadcast). Gradsky took part in a charity concert for the liquidators of Chernobyl disaster.

Since the late '80s, Gradsky taught vocals at the Gnesin Music Academy and performed there. In 1987, he became a member of Union of Russian Composers.

His collaboration with John Denver, with whom he performed the 1986 song Let us Begin..., brought him to wider international attention. On 16 July 1988 Gradsky performed at the San Francisco, California Golden Gate Park Bandshell as part of the American Soviet Peace Walk Concert. Later that evening he also played acoustic guitar and sang during the intermission (set break) at the Grateful Dead Rex Foundation Charity concert at U.C. Berkeley's Greek Theater. In 1990, he got a contract with Victor Entertainment and released two albums containing songs in Russian and English as well as Japanese romances. In 1999, he performed a recital at New York City's Carnegie Hall.

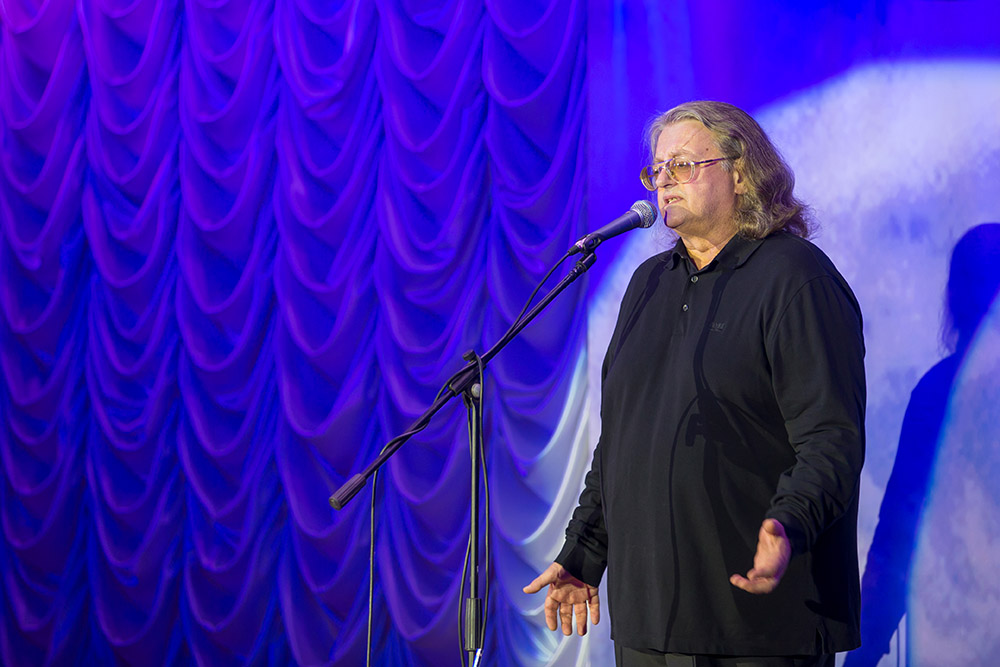
Gradsky in Tiraspol, 2014

In late 2009, Alexander Gradsky released a 4-CD opera adaptation of Mikhail Bulgakov's novel The Master and Margarita (Ма́стер и Маргари́та), starring Gradsky himself as Master, Woland, Yeshua and Behemoth. The opera also stars Nikolai Fomenko as Koroviev, Mikhail Seryshev (formerly of Master) as Ivan, and Elena Minina as Margarita, in addition to many renowned Russian singers and actors in episodic roles, including (but not limited to) Iosif Kobzon, Lyubov Kazarnovskaya, Andrey Makarevich, Alexander Rosenbaum, Arkady Arkanov, and the late Georgi Millyar (voice footage from one of his movies was used).

In his later years Gradsky positioned himself as a marginal; he was demanding of his colleagues as well as journalists.

== The Voice ==
In 2012-2014, he took part in the TV project "The Voice" as a coach along with Dima Bilan, Pelageya and Leonid Agutin. In the first three seasons, the artists from his team won — Dina Garipova, Sergey Volchkov and Alexandra Vorobyova.

He also took part in 2015; his participant, Mikhail Ozerov, took the second place.

In 2017 and 2021 Gradsky, Pelageya, Bilan and Agutin (often described in mass media as a "golden composition") returned into the show once again. In 2017, a participant from Gradsky's team, Selim Alahyarov, has won the competition. In 2021, Alisher Usmanov took the second place.

A significant part of Gradsky's team made up the troupe of the "Gradsky Hall", opened in 2015.

== Personal life ==
Alexander Gradsky was married four times. His first marriage was when he was in his early twenties but it didn't last long and they divorced within months. He was married for the second time in 1970 to actress Anastasia Vertinskaya. His third marriage was with a then 20 year old Lomonosov Moscow University economics student Olga Fartysheva. They were married for 23 years and had two children together Daniel (March 1981) and Maria (January 1986). Alexander was in a relationship with Ukrainian fashion model Marina Kotashenko in his late years, they had two sons together: Alexander (2014) and Ivan (2018).

== Death ==
After contracting COVID-19 in September 2021, amid the COVID-19 pandemic in Russia, Gradsky's health steadily deteriorated. On 26 November 2021, he did not feel well at home, and was urgently hospitalized at a Moscow hospital for a suspected stroke. On 28 November 2021, he died at the age of 72. On 1 December 2021, he was buried at the Vagankovo Cemetery.

== Discography ==
=== Rock operas ===
Russian title	English translation	Year
Стадион	Stadium (rock opera)	1985
Мастер и Маргарита	The Master and Margarita	2009

=== Other albums and EPs ===
Russian title	English translation	Released	Recorded
Давид Тухманов. Как прекрасен мир	David Tukhmanov. How Beautiful is the World (Alexander Gradsky sings two songs)	1972	1971
Поёт Александр Градский	Alexander Gradsky Sings	1973 (EP)	1969—1972
Романс о влюблённых	A Lover's Romance "A Lover's Romance" motion picture soundtrack	1974	1973
Солнце, снова солнце	Sun, Sun Again	1976 (EP)	1976
Александр Градский и ансамбль "Скоморохи"	Alexander Gradsky and Skomorokhi; Gradsky's music on R. Burns, W. Shakespeare, A. Voznesensky's verses	1976 (EP)	1976
Александр Градский и Элтон Джон (Только ты верь мне)	Alexander Gradsky and Elton John (Only You Trust Me)	1979 (EP)	1972
Русские песни	Russian Songs; Vocal Suite on the themes from the Russian folklore	1980	1976—1978
Александра Пахмутова. Птица счастья	Alexandra Pakhmutova. Bird of Happiness (Alexander Gradsky sings two songs)	1980 (EP)	
Сама жизнь Вокальная сюита на стихи Поля Элюара	Life Itself; Vocal Suite on Paul Eluard's verses	1984	1981
Звезда полей Вокальная сюита на стихи Николая Рубцова	Fields Star; Vocal Suite on verses by Nikolai Rubtsov	1986	1982
Сатиры; Вокальная сюита на стихи Саши Черного	Satire; Vocal Suite on verses by Sasha Chyorny	1987	1980
Давайте начнём	Let's Get Started	1987 (EP)	1985—1986
Утопия АГ	Utopia AG; Vocal Suite on verses by R. Burnes, P. Shelley, and Béranger	1987	1979
Размышления шута Вокальная сюита	Reflections of a Jester; Vocal Suite	1987	1971—1974
Флейта и рояль Вокальная сюита на стихи Бориса Пастернака и Владимира Маяковского	Flute and Grand Piano; Vocal Suite on verses by Boris Pasternak and Vladimir Mayakovsky	1988	1983
Ностальгия; Вокальная сюита на стихи Владимира Набокова	Nostalgia; Vocal Suite on verses by Vladimir Nabokov	1988	1984
Человек; Балет	The Man; Ballet	1988	1986
Монте-Кристо; Узник замка Иф	Monte Cristo "The Prisoner of Château d'If" motion picture soundtrack	1989	1987
Концерт-сюита	Concert Suite	1989	1979—1987
Экспедиция	Expedition	1990	1990
(n/a)	Metamorphoses	1991	1991
Несвоевременные песни	Untimely Songs	1994	1990
Фрукты с кладбища	Fruits from the Cemetery	1995	1991
ЖИВьЁМ в России	(A)live in Russia	1996	March 17, 1995
Золотое старьё	Golden Junk	1996	
Коллекция АГ (13CD)	Collection of AG (13-CD set)	1996	
Легенды русского рока Градский и группа "Скоморохи"	Legends of Russian Rock; Gradsky and Skomorokhi	1997	
ЖИВьЁМ в России 2	(A)live in Russia 2	2000	November 3, 1999
Хрестоматия	Reader	2003	2003
Песни для Иры	Songs for Ira	2003	2003
Неформат	Unformatted	2011	2010—2011

=== DVDs ===
Russian title	English translation	Year
ЖИВьЁМ в России 2 Юбилейный видеоконцерт	(A)live in Russia 2 Jubilee video concert	2004
ЖИВьЁМ в России; Юбилейный видеоконцерт	(A)live in Russia; Jubilee video concert	2010
Антиперестроечный блюз (фильм-концерт 1990)	Anti-Perestroika Blues (Film-concert 1990)	2010

== Awards ==
- Merited Artist of the Russian Federation (1997)
- State Prize of the Russian Federation (1999)
- People's Artist of Russia (1999)
- People 's Artist of the Pridnestrovian Moldavian Republic (2014)
- Vladimir Vysotsky's "Own Track" Award (2019)
