= A Lovers' Romance =

- Directed by: Andrei Konchalovsky
- Written by: Yevgeny Grigoriev
- Produced by: Alexandra Demidova
- Starring: Yevgeny Kindinov; Iya Savvina; Yelena Koreneva; Irina Kupchenko; Innokenty Smoktunovsky
- Cinematography: Levan Paatashvili
- Edited by: Valentina Kulagina
- Music by: Alexander Gradsky
- Production company: Mosfilm
- Release date: 1974
- Running time: 135 min.
- Country: Soviet Union
- Language: Russian

A Lovers' Romance or Romance for Lovers (Russian: Романс о влюблённых, romanized: Romans o vlyublyonnykh) is a 1974 Soviet musical romantic drama directed by Andrei Konchalovsky.

== Plot ==
Sergei and Tanya are in love with each other. Sergei is drafted into the marine corps and Tania waits for his return. Sergei's division is abandoned in favor of helping local residents in distress. During the operation, his armored personnel gets carried into the sea. His relatives receive a notice of his death. Tanya's loving childhood friend, a hockey player, helps her to cope with misfortune and she marries him.

But it turned out that Sergei did not perish. He, together with a wounded friend he saved, are found on a deserted island after a long winter. Back home, Sergei learns that Tanya has married another. Unable to accept the loss of his beloved, Sergei dies; but this death is a symbolic and emotional one, not physical. Sergei continues to live a normal life without shock and strong distress, meets another girl, marries her, has a child. In the finale there is a spiritual rebirth of the hero.

== Cast ==
- Yevgeny Kindinov as Sergei Nikitin (vocals by Alexander Gradsky)
- Yelena Koreneva as Tanya (vocals by Zoya Kharabadze)
- Irina Kupchenko as Lyuda (vocals by Valentina Tolkunova)
- Innokenty Smoktunovsky as Trumpeter (vocals by Vladimir Siskin)
- Elizaveta Solodova as Sergei's mother
- Iya Savvina as Tanya's mother
- Vladimir Konkin as Sergei's younger brother
- Aleksandr Zbruyev as Igor Volgin
- Roman Gromadsky as Ensign Ivan Solovyov
- Nikolai Grinko as Vice-Admiral
- Ivan Ryzhov as Vasiliy
- Alexander Samoilov as Sergei's middle brother
- Ekaterina Mazurova as Tanya's grandmother

== Awards ==
In 1974 the film received the Crystal Globe at the Karlovy Vary International Film Festival.
