= Contract with Death =

- Russian: Контракт со смертью
- Directed by: Dmitry Astrakhan
- Written by: Oleg Danilov
- Produced by: Aleksandr Kim; Dmitri Ursulyak; Tatyana Voronovich
- Starring: Andrey Myagkov; Dmitry Pevtsov; Anna Legchilova; Yuri Pristrom; Olga Sutulova
- Cinematography: Yuri Vorontsov
- Music by: Alexey Grigoriev
- Production company: Belarusfilm
- Release date: 1998
- Running time: 125 min.
- Countries: Russia; Belarus
- Language: Russian

Contract with Death (Russian: Контракт со смертью, romanized: Kontrakt so smertyu) is a 1998 Russian/Belarusian crime drama film directed by Dmitry Astrakhan.

The film was nominated for Grand Prize of the Festival at the 1998 Sochi Open Russian Film Festival.

== Plot ==
The film tells about the politicians who create the charity fund, which in fact is a concern for the use of weak people for organ transplantation.

== Cast ==
- Andrey Myagkov as Professor Ignatovski
- Dmitry Pevtsov as Stepanov
- Anna Legchilova as Lena
- Yuri Pristrom as Anton
- Olga Sutulova as Anya
- Oleg Fomin as Gena Shnyr
- Yevgeni Pimenov as Volodya
- Sergey Stepanchenko as Sergey
