= Get Thee Out =

1991 film

- Film poster with original title
- Directed by: Dmitry Astrakhan
- Written by: Dmitry Astrakhan
- Starring: Otar Megvinetukhutsesi
- Cinematography: Yuri Vorontsov
- Edited by: N. Viktorova
- Music by: Alexander Pantykin
- Production company: Lenfilm
- Release date: 11 September 1991 (TIFF)
- Running time: 83 minutes
- Country: Soviet Union
- Language: Russian

Get Thee Out (Russian: Изыди!, romanized: Izydi!) is a 1991 Soviet comedy-drama film directed by Dmitry Astrakhan. The film was selected as the Soviet entry for the Best Foreign Language Film at the 64th Academy Awards, but was not accepted as a nominee.

== Plot ==
The film was based on literary works of Sholom Aleichem, Aleksandr Kuprin and Isaac Babel.

Motya Rabinovich, in celebration of his good fortune, is preparing a feast for the entire village. However, his mind is haunted by visions of pogroms rolling across the country. His only daughter has converted to Christianity in order to marry the son of the village elder. Alongside the troubling visions, scenes emerge of a truck, carrying pogromists under the Russian tricolor flag, ominously approaching the village to a mournful waltz.

In the final scene, Motya and his family are packing up to leave the village with all their belongings. But as they prepare to depart, Motya spots a crowd approaching the village. In a moment of desperation, he grabs an axe and rushes to meet the truck of terror. A miracle happens—he is joined by the local men, who march alongside him toward their inevitable fate.

== Cast ==
- Otar Megvinetukhutsesi as Motya Rabinovich
- Elena Anisimova as Golda
- Tamari Skhirtladze as Sora-Broha
- Tatyana Kuznetsova as Beylka
- Valentin Bukin as Trofim
- Vladimir Kabalin as Ivan
- Aleksandr Lykov as Petya
- Kseniya Rappoport as Sima
- Nikolai Rybnikov as Nikifor, innkeeper
- Viktor Mikhailov as constable
- Viktor Bychkov as Yegor
- Antonina Vvedenskaya as Maria

== Production ==
Making his debut in cinema, the young theater director from Leningrad Dmitry Astrakhan, along with his permanent co-author playwright Oleg Danilov, turned to the Jewish theme, which was as popular in the late 1980s as the Stalinist theme. According to Astrakhan's recollections, he was allocated 100,000 rubles for a movie worth a million rubles at the prices of that time on Lenfilm. The remaining 900 thousand he found through a journalist Vladimir Kamyshev.

== See also ==
- List of submissions to the 64th Academy Awards for Best Foreign Language Film
- List of Soviet submissions for the Academy Award for Best Foreign Language Film
