= From Hell to Hell =

1997 film

- DVD cover
- Directed by: Dmitry Astrakhan
- Written by: Artur Brauner; Oleg Danilov
- Produced by: Artur Brauner; Tina Yashul
- Starring: Valeria Valeeva; Alla Kliouka; Anja Kling
- Cinematography: Yuri Vorontsov
- Edited by: Vera Kolyadenko
- Music by: Alexander Pantykin
- Production company: Belarusfilm
- Release date: 1997
- Running time: 90 minutes
- Country: Belarus
- Languages: German; Russian; Yiddish

From Hell to Hell (Belarusian: З пекла ў пекла; Russian: Из ада в ад, romanized: Iz ada v ad) is a 1997 Belarusian drama film about the Kielce pogrom directed by Dmitry Astrakhan. The film was selected as the Belarusian entry for the Best Foreign Language Film at the 69th Academy Awards, but was not accepted as a nominee.

== Plot ==
In 1941, the Polish town Kielce is occupied by the Nazis. The main character, before being sent to a concentration camp, gives her daughter to a Polish family whose child has recently died. When the war has passed, the former prisoner returns to his hometown and wants his daughter returned, but she has grown up not knowing who her real parents were. Internal contradictions and deep spiritual experiences put the heroes in a cruel situation of choice.

== Cast ==
- Valeria Valeeva as Fela
- Anja Kling as Helena Golde
- Gennadi Svir as Henryk Golde
- Alla Kliouka as Anna Sikorska
- Gennady Nazarov as Andrzej Sikorski
- Vladimir Kabalin as Bashnak
- Svetlana Kryuchkova as guard at a concentration camp

== See also ==
- List of submissions to the 69th Academy Awards for Best Foreign Language Film
- List of Belarusian submissions for the Academy Award for Best Foreign Language Film
