= Utopiya A. G. =

Studio album by Alexander Gradsky
- Released: 1987
- Recorded: 1979
- Genre: Rock
- Length: 36:22
- Language: Russian
- Label: Melodiya
- Producer: Alexander Gradsky

Alexander Gradsky chronology
Satiry (1987)	Utopiya A. G. (1987)	Razmyshleniya shuta (1987)

Utopiya A. G. (Russian: Утопия А. Г.), also known as Utopiya Alexandra Gradskogo (Утопия Александра Градского; transl. Utopia of Alexander Gradsky), is a 1987 studio album by Russian singer-songwriter Alexander Gradsky.

== Background and release ==
The music from this album was recorded for the 1978 TV film The Heirs of Prometheus (Russian: Наследники Прометея, romanized: Nasledniki Prometeya), dedicated to the utopian socialists Henri de Saint-Simon, Charles Fourier and others. It was supposed to be a rock opera in which utopian socialists sing and dance. The theme of socialist utopia did not leave Gradsky, so in 1979, he recorded an album that included poems by Pierre-Jean de Béranger, Percy Bysshe Shelley and Robert Burns, which at one time were revolutionary songs.

The record Utopiya A. G. did not immediately receive the approval of the Melodiya Art Council. Neither the ideologically correct theme, nor Gradsky's connections, nor the neutral genre of the song suite, nor even the presence of a hammer and sickle on the cover helped her break through. The album was released only in 1987, when sympathy for the ideals of socialism was inappropriate.

== Critical reception ==
In a retrospective review of the Muzykalnaya zhizn magazine, Denis Boyarinov noted that the record, which is an unusual combination of times and epochs, was released at a time when it seemed completely inappropriate, because then people were hungry for change. The reviewer also added that now it resembles a giant majolica made in sound for the glory of socialism, which still pop up in small towns lost in the snows of Russia—sometimes it's the best thing there, shiny fragments of illusion, pure psychedelia.

== Track listing ==
All music is composed by Alexander Gradsky.

Side A
No.	Title	Lyrics	Translator	Length
1.	"Beranzhe I"	Pierre-Jean de Béranger	Valentin Dmitriyev	8:46
2.	"Beranzhe II"	Béranger	Mikhail Mikhaylov	3:08
3.	"Oranzhevoye nastroyeniye"			2:19
4.	"Shelli"	Percy Bysshe Shelley	Samuil Marshak	3:41
Total length:				17:54

Side B
No.	Title	Lyrics	Translator	Length
1.	"Fioletovoye nastroyeniye"			2:45
2.	"Beranzhe III"	Béranger	Dmitriyev	2:06
3.	"Beranzhe IV"	Béranger	Vasily Kurochkin	5:41
4.	"Beranzhe V"	Béranger	Kurochkin	1:01
5.	"Byorns I"	Robert Burns	Marshak	1:00
6.	"Byorns II"	Burns	Marshak	1:20
7.	"Beranzhe VI"	Béranger	Alexander Tkhorzhevsky; Ivan Tkhorzhevsky	4:35
Total length:				18:28

== Personnel ==
- Alexander Gradsky – vocals, synthesizer, guitar, piano, celesta, drums, bells, percussion
- Vladimir Vasilkov – percussion
- Sergey Zenko – flute, pipe, saxophone
- Skoromorokhi – backing band

Credits are adapted from the album's liner notes.
