= Mikhail Segal =

Russian film director and writer

Mikhail Segal Михаил Сегал
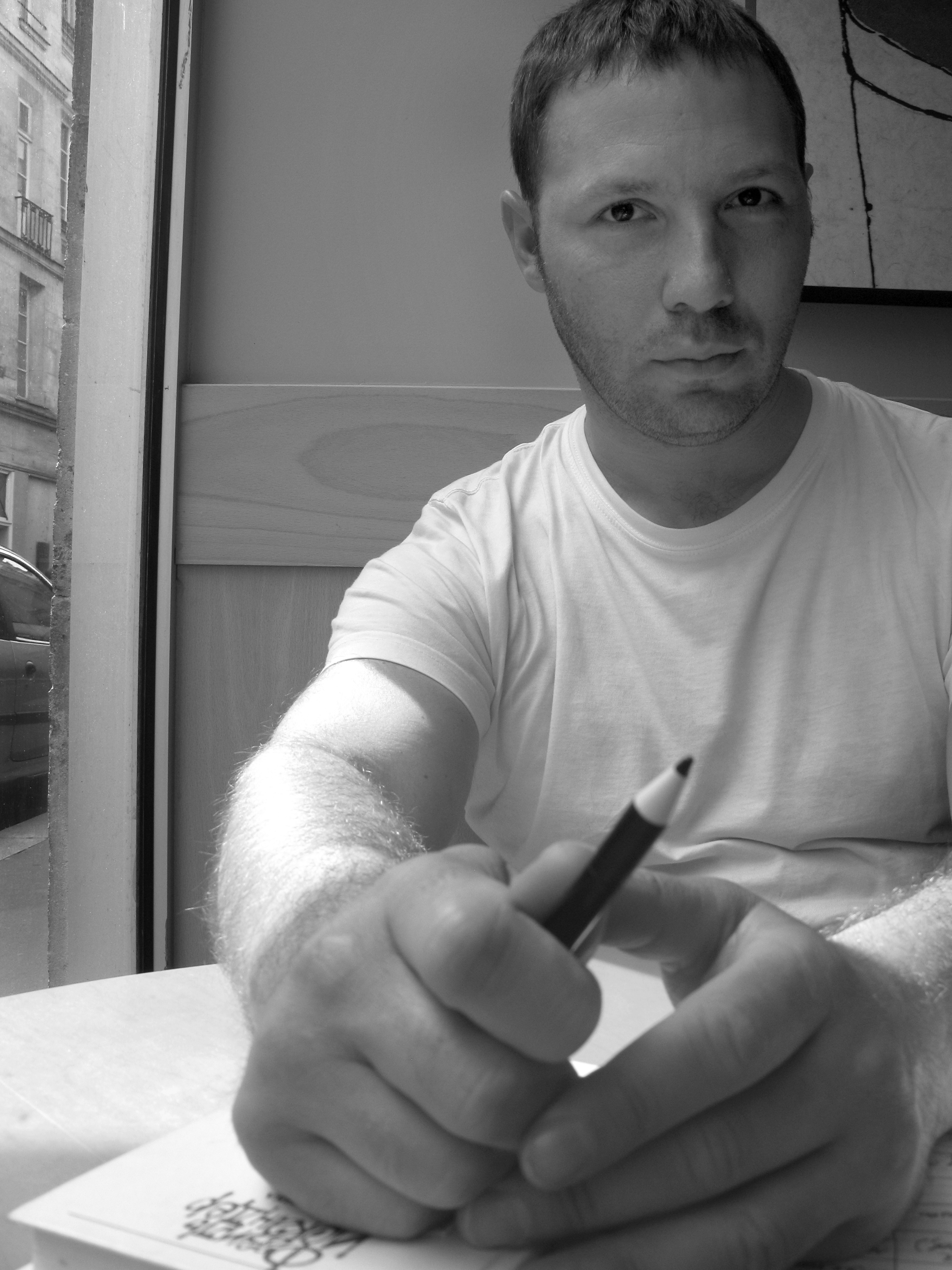
- Born: 3 January 1974 (age 51); Oryol, USSR
- Occupation(s): Director, writer

Mikhail Yurievich Segal, (Russian: Михаил Юрьевич Сегал; born 3 January 1974) is a Russian film director and writer.

== Biography ==
Mikhail grew up in Oryol, Russia. As a schoolboy he was attending a theatrical studio at the local House of Pioneers (a USSR name for Technical and Fine Arts Club for children), writing plays and staging performances. By that time he shot his first short-length works with amateur cameras.

In 1994 he graduated from Director Faculty of Oryol Institute of Culture (V.I. Simonenko's chair). He was composing poems and songs and performing with his band "Music To The Touch".

In 1995, he entered Director Department of Russian State Institute for Cinematography ("VGIK") in Moscow (V. Naumov's chair) but dropped studies after the first year and started shooting video clips. His first appreciable work had become "Hello, Night" for "Ser'ga" (1996). Later on, Mikhail worked both with "pop-" and "rock-" performers but gained reputation of an "anti-cheapstuff" clip maker as a result. Amongst his well-known works are

- B2("My Rock-n-Roll")
- Spleen ("Romance", "Tell", "New People", "Plastic Life")
- Nogu Svelo! ("Our Young and Funny Voices", "From Alma-Aty")
- The Caste ("Noise is Around", "Radio Signals", "Closed Space", "Billion Years", "Let It Come in Handy", "Ship Mood", "About Sex")
- Night Snipers ("Catastrophically").
- Time Machine ("Once Upon a Time")
- Vasya Oblomov ("Tragedy").

He also worked with "Masha and Bears", "Notional Hallucinations", and many others.

In 2007, the clip "Tell" for Spleen was appointed the winner of The Best Music Video nomination at the MTV Russia Music Awards ceremony.

From 2002 on, Mikhail also works in advertising. He has shot commercials for Audi, Mitsubishi, Panasonic, LG, Ariel, IKEA, Alpen Gold, Pepsi, Fervex, Baltica, White Bear, MTS, Kyivstar, MTV, Mail.ru, and many other brands.

In 2006 at XXVIII Moscow International Film Festival, Mikhail presented his first full-length film "Franz+Polina" interpreting the narrative "Dumb" by Ales Adamovich. The history of love of a Belarusian girl from an occupied village and of an SS soldier "has crossed the world" and got recognition at many Russian and international festivals (in Germany, France, Poland, Canada, China, and other countries).

In 2010, "AST" publishing house published Mikhail's first book of prose "Youth" containing a story of the same name and a collection of short novels. The video to support the book came out, featuring musicians whose music videos Mikhail directed.

In 2011, Segal shot a short film "Fasteners Solutions" which was based on one of his novels, and the film won the short-film nomination at Kinotavr film festival. The same summer, 3 other novels were shot, and a full-length movie «Short Stories» that got a widespread fame later on, was presented at the next 2012 Kinotavr.

In 2014, Mikhail Segal presented his third full-length movie A Film About Alexeev, with the lead role by Alexander Zbruev, who by that time was not playing in cinema for already 10 years.

In 2018, the movie Elephants Can Play Football and the book Почерк were released.

Mikhail was a movie festival jury member at FIPA-2012 (Biarritz, France), Baltic Debuts-2014 (Svetlogorsk, Russia), Kinoshock 2015 (Anapa, Russia), OIFF-2016 (Odesa, Ukraine), and others.

He is an author of novels for Russian Pioneer magazine.

== Filmography ==
=== Actor ===
- 2006 - Franz+Polina - Commissioner
- 2018 - Elephants Can Play Football — Masha's father

=== Director ===
- 2006 — Franz+Polina
- 2011 — Fasteners Solutions
- 2012 — Short Stories
- 2013 — Sheep (short)
- 2013 — What Are We Gonna Do? (short)
- 2014 — A Film About Alexeev
- 2018 — Elephants Can Play Football
- 2019 — Six Years Without Sex (short)
- 2020 — Deeper!

=== Screenwriter ===
- 2006 — Franz+Polina (after the novel "Dumb" by Ales Adamovich, in collaboration with Vladimir Stepanenko and Maxim Trapo)
- 2011 — Fasteners Solutions
- 2012 — Short Stories
- 2013 — GQ (short)
- 2013 — Sheep (short)
- 2013 — What Are We Gonna Do? (short)
- 2014 — A Film About Alexeev
- 2017 — Thanks, Grandfather (short)
- 2018 — Elephants Can Play Football
- 2019 — Six Year Without Sex (short)
- 2020 — Deeper! (Глубже!)

=== Producer ===
- 2017 — Thanks, Grandfather (short)

=== Composer ===
- 2014 — A Film About Alexeev
- 2018 — Elephants Can Play Football

== Awards and nominations ==
=== Franz+Polina ===
- 2006 – Participant of XVIII Moscow International Film Festival (Russia)
- 2006 – Prize-winner XVI, Cottbus International Film Festival (Germany)
- 2006 – Participant of Russian Cinema Week, Paris and Berlin
- 2006 – Official participant, XVI Camerimage International Film Festival, Łódź (Poland)
- 2006 – Grand Prix and Best Female Performance Award, S. F. Bondarchuk Military-Patriotic Film Festival "Volokolamsk Line" 2006 (Russia)
- 2006 – Special Jury Diploma and Best Female Performance Award, XV International Film Festival “Kinoshock”, Anapa (Russia)
- 2007 – Best Principal Female Role and Best Episodic Female Role awards, Dramatic Art Festival Sozvezdie /Constellation film festival, Tver (Russia)
- 2006 – Special Jury Award "Baltic Debuts", International Film Festival, Svetlogorsk (Russia)
- 2006 – Best Debut and Best Photography awards, "Listapad" Film Festival", Minsk (Belarus)
- 2007 – Grand Prix for best film, 21st Cabourg Film Festival (France)
- 2007 – Grand Prix for the Best Film and the Best Music Award, 20th FIPA Festival Biarritz (France)
- 2007 – FIPRESCI prize, International Film Festival "Cinema-Tout-Ecran", Geneva (Switzerland)
- 2007 – Best Male Performance, "13th Shanghai TV Festival”, Shanghai (China)
- 2007 – Official participant of the World Film Festival Montreal (Canada)
- 2007 – Award for best direction, "Viva Cinema of Russia!” Film Festival, St. Petersburg (Russia)
- 2007 – P. Lebeshev award for the best pictorial realization, International Film Festival "Spirit of Fire", Khanty-Mansiysk (Russia)

=== Short stories ===
- 2012 – XXIII Open Russian Film Festival "Kinotavr", G. Gorin's prize "For the best screenplay" and Russian Cinema Critic Guild diploma
- 2012 – BFI London Film Festival, official participant, London, UK
- 2012 – Montreal International Film Festival, Focus of World Cinema, Montreal, Canada
- 2012 – Cottbus Film Festival, Germany
- 2012 – X Moscow Film Festival of Russian cinema "Moscow Premiere" – Kinoprocess magazine award
- 2012 – Open Russian Film Festival "Amur Autumn", Blagoveshchensk – jury's special prize
- 2012 – International Film Festival "Vivat to Russian Cinema!", Saint-Petersburg, Grand-Prix
- 2012 – Nomination for National cinema critic and cinema press prize "White Elephant" for the best music
- 2012 – Cairo International Film Festival, Cairo, Egypt
- 2012 – Pau Onternational Film Festival, Pau, France
- 2012–2013 – Russian Cinema Week participant at Paris, Honfleur, France; Bucharest, Romania; Tel Aviv, Israel
- 2013 – Russian Cinema Festival in Marbella, Spain – The Best Film prize and People's Choice Award
- 2013 – Satire and Humor "The Gold Joker" award, the Cinema nomination winner
- 2013 – Jameson Dublin Film Festival, Dublin, Ireland, The Best Director award
- 2013 – SIFF, Seattle International Film Festival, Seattle, US, an official participant
- 2013 – Göteborg International Film Festival, Gothenburg, Sweden, am official participant
- 2013 – Nika cinema prize contest, nominated

=== A Film About Alexeev ===
2014 - XXV Open Russian Film Festival Kinotavr, an official participant

2014 - "The Golden Eagle Award, The Best Male Performance award (Alexander Zbruev)

Elephants Can Play Football

2018 - Montreal International Film Festival, Le Festival des films du mond, FFM, an official participant

2018 - Kinotavr - official participant

2018 - Arctic Open Film Festival- The Best Director award

== Bibliography ==
- Молодость (АСТ, 2010)
- Рассказы (АСТ, 2012)
- Почерк (ЭКСМО, 2018)
