= Dmitry Astrakhan =

Russian film director and actor

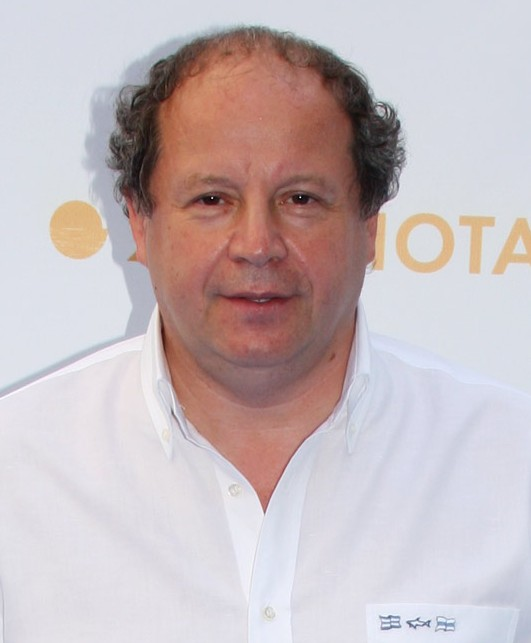
- Born: Dmitry Hananovich Astrakhan; March 17, 1957 (age 69); Leningrad, Soviet Union (now Russia)
- Citizenship: Russian Federation
- Occupations: film director, actor
- Spouse: Elena Astrakhan

Dmitry Hananovich Astrakhan (Russian: Дмитрий Хананович Астрахан; born March 17, 1957) is a Russian film director and actor. Honored Artist of the Russian Federation (2009).

== Biography ==
Dmitry Astrakhan was born in the family of Leningrad historians Hanan Markovich Astrakhan and Susanna Markovna Manevich, natives of Belarus. He was the youngest, the fifth child in the family. At school he was interested in reading, mathematics, and sports. After the end of the eighth grade, he entered the Physics and Mathematics School No. 30 on Vasilievsky Island and at the same time continued to engage in classical wrestling. After graduation, he was admitted to the Saint Petersburg Electrotechnical University. For several years, he studied at several different institutions before being admitted to the Leningrad State Institute of Theater, Music and Cinematography, to the Musil class (graduated in 1982). As a thesis work was to stage a performance in the Alexandrinsky Theatre, however, according to Astrakhan himself, after the artistic director of the theater learned that Astrakhan was a Jew, they did not give the play.

From 1981 to 1987 he was the director of the Sverdlovsk theater of the young spectator. Then he served in the army (naval aviation). He staged performances in various theaters of Russia and abroad, trained at Tovstonogov in Leningrad.

From 1991 to 1995, he directed the Saint Petersburg Comedy Theatre.

In 2017 he became a member of the jury of 3rd Moscow Jewish Film Festival.

== Filmography ==
=== As director (selected) ===
- Get Thee Out (1991)
- You Are My Only Love (1993)
- The Fourth Planet (1995)
- Everything Will Be Fine! (1995)
- From Hell to Hell (1997)
- Waiting Hall (1998)
- Crossroads (1998)
- Contract with Death (1998)
- Alchemists (2000)
- Give Me Moonlight (2001)
- Yellow Dwarf (2001)
- Tartaren from Tarascon (2003)
- All Honestly (2004)
- Golden Country (2011)
- Little Children (2012)
- Love Without Rules (2016)

=== As actor (selected) ===
- Everything Will Be Fine! (1995) as mathematician
- From Hell to Hell (1997) as JDC employee
- Vysotsky. Thank You For Being Alive (2011) as Leonid Fridman
- Chagall — Malevich (2014) as Itzke, Rabbi
- The End of a Beautiful Epoch (2015) as Misha Shablinsky
- Goznak (2015) as fashion designer
- House Arrest as Andrey Mishkin, the lawyer
- What Men Talk About. Continuation (2018) as serving at the funeral

== Awards ==
1991

- Moscow International Film Festival – Ecumenical Jury Award Special Mention (Get Thee Out)

1995

- Love is Folly International Film Festival (Bulgaria) – Golden Aphrodite (Everything Will Be Fine!)

2012

- Nika Award – Discovery of the Year (Vysotsky. Thank You For Being Alive)

2016

- Golden Eagle Award – Best Supporting Actor (The End of a Beautiful Epoch)
