= Everything Will Be Fine! =

- Directed by: Dmitry Astrakhan
- Written by: Oleg Danilov
- Produced by: Igor Kalyonov; Andrey Razumovsky; Yuri Romanenko
- Starring: Anatoly Zhuravlyov; Olga Ponizova; Mikhail Ulyanov
- Cinematography: Yuri Vorontsov
- Edited by: Nina Dushenkova
- Music by: Aleksandr Pantykin
- Production companies: Nikola-film; Fora-film; Lenfilm
- Release date: April 13, 1996
- Running time: 100 min.
- Country: Russia
- Language: Russian

Everything Will Be Fine! (Russian: Всё будет хорошо!, romanized: Vsyo budet khorosho!) is a 1995 comedy film directed by Dmitry Astrakhan.

== Plot ==
Quiet and measured life in an old residence of a provincial town are waiting for fun change in the lives of the main characters of the film Kolya, Olya and Petya and other hostel residents. It all starts with the return of Nikolay (Kolya) from the Army; he prepares for his wedding with Olga. At the same time, the city comes to businessman Konstantin Smirnov, who once lived in this hostel. Naturally, he visit his first love (Kolya's mother). Konstantin's son, Pyotr (Petya), a young genius, winner of the Nobel Prize, falls in love with Olya and meets reciprocal feelings. Olya makes a painfully difficult choice in favor of the groom. Peter comes to the wedding to wish happiness to the young couple, but runs away with the bride. Olga and Pyotr live happily abroad, and Kolya finds a job at the plant.

== Cast ==
- Anatoly Zhuravlyov as Kolya Orlov
- Olga Ponizova as Olga
- Mark Goronok as Pyotr Smirnov
- Aleksandr Zbruyev as Konstantin Petrovich Smirnov
- Valentin Bukin asSemyon Petrovich, Olya's father
- Mikhail Ulyanov as Grandpa
- Valentina Panina as Natasha
- Irina Mazurkevich as Aunt Katya, Kolya's mother
- Vladimir Kabalin as Uncle Vova
- Andrey Fedortsov as Kolya's friend
- Arthur Vakha as administrator
- Valery Kravchenko as Andrey Samsonov
- Dmitry Astrakhan as mathematician

== Awards ==
- 1995 — Grand Prix Love is Folly (Varna)
- 1995 — Kinotavr — Nomination: Greater Grand Prix competition
