= Oleg Danilov =

Russian playwright and screenwriter (1949–2021)

Oleg Daniilovich Danilov (Russian: Оле́г Дании́лович Дани́лов; 26 October 1949 – 2 January 2021) was a Russian playwright and screenwriter best known for collaborating with film director Dmitry Astrakhan.

He died of COVID-19 in Minsk at the age of 71 during the COVID-19 pandemic in Belarus.
