= Capital punishment in Russia =

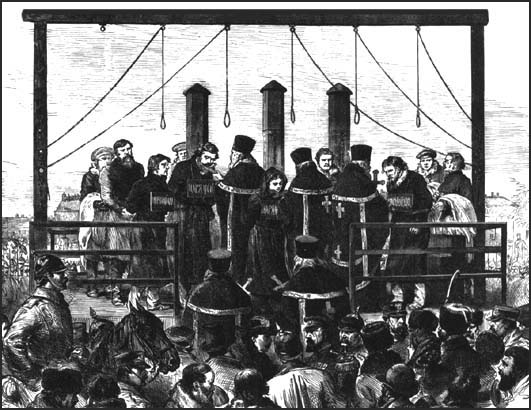
Execution of the murderers of Alexander II of Russia

Capital punishment is a legal penalty in Russia but is not used due to a moratorium and no death sentences or executions have been carried out since 2 August 1996 execution of serial killer Sergey Golovkin. Russia has had an implicit moratorium in place since one was established by President Boris Yeltsin in 1996, and explicitly established by the Constitutional Court of Russia in 1999 and reaffirmed in 2009.

== History ==
=== Medieval Russia ===
Ibn Fadlan who had contact with the Rus' around 921 reported that they executed thieves by hanging.

In medieval Russia, capital punishment was relatively rare and was even banned in many, if not most, Russian principalities. The Russkaya Pravda, created in the early 11th century, did not prescribe the death penalty, instead permitting blood feuds, a practice subsequently abolished by Yaroslav's sons.

One of the first legal documents resembling a modern penal code was enacted in 1398, which mentioned a single capital crime: a theft performed after two prior convictions (an early precursor to the current three-strikes laws existing in several U.S. states). The Sudebnik of 1497 extends this list significantly, mentioning three specialized theft instances (those committed in a church, stealing a horse, or, as before, with two prior "strikes"), as well as arson and treason. The trend to increase the number of capital crimes continued: in 1649, this list included 63 crimes, a figure that nearly doubled during the reign of Peter I. The methods of execution were extremely cruel by modern standards and included drowning, burying alive, and forcing liquid metal into the throat.

=== Tsarist Russia ===
During the reign of Alexis of Russia (1645–1676), 7,000 executions occurred solely for counterfeiting coins.

In 1698, Peter I executed 1,166 participants of the streltsy uprising.

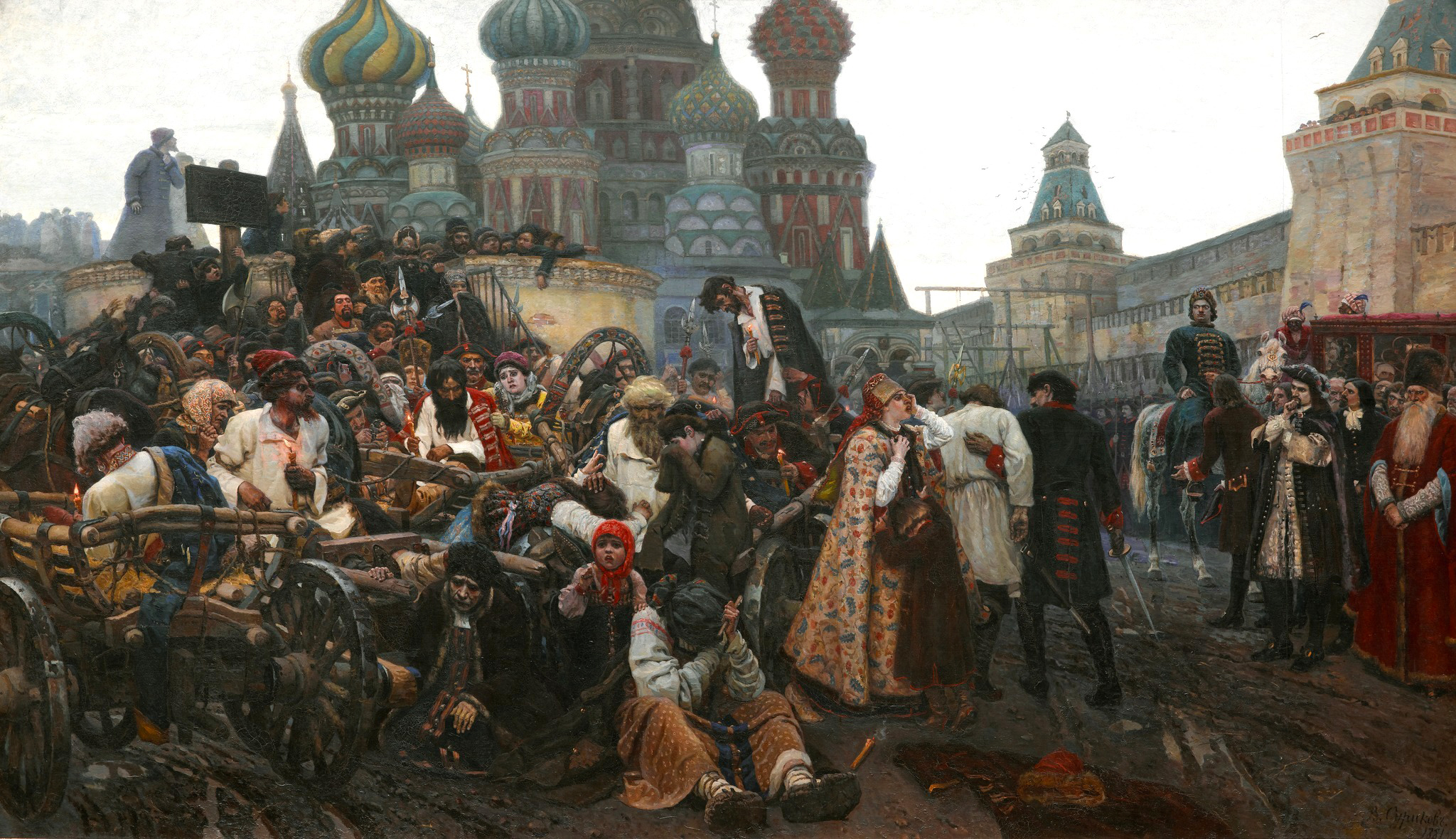
The Morning of the Streltsy Execution by Vasily Ivanovich Surikov

Elizabeth (r. 1741–1762) did not share her father Peter's views on the death penalty, and officially suspended it in 1745, effectively enacting a moratorium. This lasted for 11 years, after which the death penalty was permitted again, after considerable opposition to the moratorium from both the nobility and, in part, from the Empress herself.

Perhaps the first public statement on the matter to be both serious and strong came from Catherine the Great, whose liberal views were consistent with her acceptance of the Enlightenment. In her Nakaz of 1767, the Empress expressed disdain for the death penalty, considering it to be improper, adding: "In the usual state of the society, the death penalty is neither useful nor needed". However, an explicit exception was still allowed for the case of someone who, even while convicted and incarcerated, "still has the means and the might to ignite public unrest". This specific exception applied to mutineers of Pugachev's Rebellion in 1775; earlier she executed Vasily Mirovich in 1764 and four perpetrators of the plague riot of 1771.

Consistent with Catherine's stance, the next several decades marked a shift in public perception against the death penalty; during the reign of her grandson Alexander I (1801–1825), only 84 people were executed. In 1824, the very existence of such a punishment was among the reasons for the legislature's refusal to approve a new version of the Penal Code. Just one year later, the Decembrist revolt failed, and a court sentenced 36 of the rebels to death. Nicholas I's decision to commute all but five of the sentences was typical for the era. Such commutations were a recurring feature of Russian justice: for instance, in 1820, the commander of the Semyonovsky Regiment had his death sentence commuted following a mutiny of his unit. Similarly, death sentences for leaders of the 1802 Latvian peasant uprising were later commuted. Empress Catherine also commuted 54 death sentences for participants of the 1772 Yaik Cossack's Uprising. Furthermore, after Paul became tsar in 1796, a general amnesty was enacted, including for participants of the 1794 Kościuszko Uprising, including Kościuszko himself. Even after Pugachev's Rebellion, of the 12,438 people investigated by secret commissions, only 48 were officially executed; however, thousands of other rebels were summarily executed by government troops.

In 1826–1905, 1,397 people were sentenced to death, with 894 of them being executed. In 1905–1913, 6,871 were sentenced and 2,981 were executed. In 1866–1891, 134 were sentenced to death for political crimes, with 44 of them being executed.

Death penalty in the late Russian Empire
| Years | Sentenced | Executed |
|---|---|---|
| 1875–1880 | | 114 |
| 1881–1885 | | 71 |
| 1886–1890 | | 76 |
| 1891–1895 | | 47 |
| 1896–1900 | | 78 |
| 1901–1905 | | 93 |
| 1905 | 72 | 10 |
| 1906–1907 | 2,608 | 1,283 |
| 1908 | 1,741 | 825 |
| 1909 | 1,435 | 543 |
| 1910 | 434 | 129 |
| 1911 | 237 | 58 |
| 1912 | 229 | 108 |
| 1913 | 115 | 25 |

By the late 1890s, capital punishment for murder was virtually never carried out, but substituted with 10 to 15 years imprisonment with hard labor, although it still was carried out for treason (for example, Alexander Ulyanov was hanged in 1887). However, in 1906, capital punishment was expanded up to introduction of drumhead court-martials that summarily executed 683 people in 1906–1907.

Capital punishment was applied during the World War I, notably in the case of Colonel Myasoyedov and three associates, who were wrongly executed as alleged German spies. The war also saw the execution of 92 mutinous soldiers during the Christmas Battles of January 1917.

=== Russian Republic ===
The death penalty was officially outlawed on March 12, 1917, following the February Revolution and the establishment of the Russian Republic. On May 12, 1917, the death penalty became applicable to soldiers at the front.

=== Russian SFSR and the Soviet Union ===
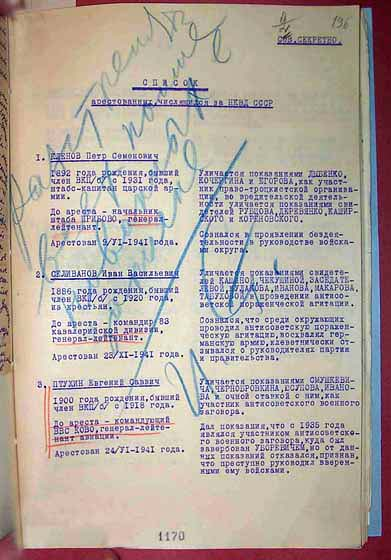
Lavrentiy Beria's proposal of January 29, 1942, to execute 46 generals. Joseph Stalin's resolution: "Shoot all named in the list. – J. St.".

Upon seizing power, the Bolsheviks initially abolished the death penalty. This measure, however, remained in effect for less than nine months. Unofficial executions of various opposition figures, including liberal leaders such as Kokoshkin and Shingarev began as early as January 1918, in February Soviet government decreed that enemy agents could be shot on sight. Admiral Schastny was the first officially executed by the Revolutionary Tribunal in July 1918. The Bolsheviks extensively employed hangings and shootings as part of the Red Terror.

The death penalty was again abolished in 1920, only to be reinstated four months later. The 1922 Code subsequently permitted capital punishment for 34 crimes, 11 of which were counterrevolutionary; even the act of crossing borders could result in the death penalty.

During Joseph Stalin's rule, the list of capital crimes greatly expanded to include vague offenses such as "rendering any kind of assistance whatever to the international bourgeoisie." Following the murder of Sergei Kirov in 1934, the death penalty was further streamlined, forbidding appeals and mandating immediate execution after judgment for those accused of "terrorist acts".

The use of capital punishment peaked during the Great Purge in the 1930s. To expedite trials, NKVD troikas were created, delivering an estimated 82% of all political sentences. The exact number of executions is debated. Archival research suggests figures between 700,000 and 800,000. Official reports to Nikita Khrushchev cite 642,980 death penalty sentences in 1954, and 688,503 in 1956, with 681,692 of these occurring in 1937–1938.

Estimates of executions during World War II vary; Grigori F. Krivosheev puts it at 135,000, Novaya Gazeta reported 284,333 death sentences, with 157,593 being executed. Separately, French historian Nicolas Werth stated that military tribunals alone sentenced 183,780 individuals to death.

Individuals sentenced to death by military tribunals
| 1940 | 1941 | 1942 | 1943 | 1944 | 1945 | 1946 | 1947 | 1948 | 1949 | 1950 | 1951 | 1952 | 1953 |
|---|---|---|---|---|---|---|---|---|---|---|---|---|---|
| 1,492 | 50,016 | 75,871 | 22,163 | 16,481 | 10,400 | 5,165 | 1,201 | 0 | 0 | 549 | 442 | 0 | 0 |

During World War II, Soviet authorities introduced a special decree, Ukaz 39 (Note: The decree is frequently cited as Ukaz 43, though its official designation was No. 39.) of April 19, 1943, which stipulated public hanging as a form of execution for war crimes and introduced drumhead court-martials. The direct battlefield application of these specific tribunals was relatively contained. In 1943, these courts analyzed 843 cases, leading to the execution of 815 individuals out of more than 1,000 tried. In 1944, they tried only 888 people. However, the provisions of this decree extended far beyond these immediate field tribunals, influencing general Soviet jurisprudence. Under this broader application, at least 81,780 people were sentenced (though not necessarily to death); an overwhelming majority of these individuals were not executed and were subsequently amnestied in 1955. Furthermore, the decree provided the legal basis for high-profile public trials targeting captured Nazi war criminals and their allies. In these specific proceedings, 253 people were tried, leading to 81 executions. Similarly, the decree underpinned the prosecutions of high-ranking Soviet collaborators, notably figures such as Vlasov, Krasnov, and Semenov.

The death penalty was again abolished on 26 May 1947, the strictest sentence becoming 25 years' imprisonment, before it was restored on 12 May 1950, first for treason and espionage, and then for aggravated murder. A total of 839,772 people were officially sentenced for counterrevolutionary activity between 1918 and 1953.

Individuals sentenced to death for counterrevolutionary activity
| 1918 | 1919 | 1920 | 1921 | 1922 | 1923 | 1924 | 1925 | 1926 | 1927 | 1928 | 1929 | 1930 | 1931 |
|---|---|---|---|---|---|---|---|---|---|---|---|---|---|
| 6,185 | 3,456 | 16,068 | 9,701 | 1,962 | 414 | 2,550 | 2,433 | 990 | 2,363 | 869 | 2,109 | 20,201 | 1,481 |
| 1932 | 1933 | 1934 | 1935 | 1936 | 1937 | 1938 | 1939 | 1940 | 1941 | 1942 | 1943 | 1944 | 1945 |
| 2,728 | 2,154 | 2,056 | 1,229 | 1,118 | 353,074 | 328,618 | 2,601 | 1,863 | 23,726 | 20,193 | 3,877 | 3,110 | 2,308 |
| 1946 | 1947 | 1948 | 1949 | 1950 | 1951 | 1952 | 1953 | 1954 | 1955 | 1956 | 1957 | 1958 | |
| 2,273 | 898 | 0 | 0 | 468 | 1,602 | 1,611 | 300 | 79 | 40 | 31 | 50 | 83 | |

In the early 1960s the death penalty was additionally expanded to include crimes of an economic nature such as counterfeiting, illegal currency transactions, and bribery.

Between 1961 and 1991, 14,953 individuals were sentenced to death in the Russian SFSR. Concurrently, the Soviet Union as a whole saw 33,329 death sentences handed down from 1954 to 1991. (Note: In the 1980s, Western Sovietology was aware of the high rate of death sentences in the early 1960s, but it wrongly extrapolated this trend to the 1980s by claiming that 2,000 death sentences were passed annually during that later period.)

Individuals sentenced to death in the RSFSR
| 1961 | 1962 | 1963 | 1964 | 1965 | 1966 | 1967 | 1968 | 1969 | 1970 | 1971 | 1972 | 1973 | 1974 | 1975 | 1976 |
|---|---|---|---|---|---|---|---|---|---|---|---|---|---|---|---|
| 1,890 | 2,159 | 935 | 623 | 379 | 574 | 522 | 511 | 471 | 476 | 427 | 416 | 335 | 317 | 273 | 227 |
| 1977 | 1978 | 1979 | 1980 | 1981 | 1982 | 1983 | 1984 | 1985 | 1986 | 1987 | 1988 | 1989 | 1990 | 1991 | |
| 222 | 276 | 353 | 423 | 415 | 458 | 488 | 448 | 407 | 223 | 120 | 115 | 100 | 223 | 147 | |

According to the GARF archives database, between 1978 and 1985, there were 3,058 death sentences that had been appealed to the Supreme Soviet of the RSFSR.

From the 1960s, approximately 95% of those sentenced to death had committed intentional homicide under aggravating circumstances. The median age of these individuals was just over 30. The proportion of death row inmates who were unemployed or not engaged in studies, despite being capable, increased sharply from 16.3% in 1961 to 70.6% in 1996. 73.2% of them had prior convictions for other crimes.

Pardons were granted by the Presidium of the Supreme Soviet of the USSR or RSFSR. In practice, this typically involved replacing a death sentence with the maximum punishment permitted by law below that of death. While 74% of death-row inmates submitted pardon petitions, pardons remained rare, with approximately 20% of inmates pardoned between 1956 and 1965, and only 10% between 1985 and 1990.

While the 1922 Code prohibited the application of the death penalty for those younger than 18, a decree in effect from 1935 to 1959 lowered this age limit to 12. This change allowed for the execution of 17-year-old serial murderer Vinnichevsky. Later, in 1964, the Soviet Union executed 15-year-old Neyland, which required the retroactive application of a law.

The application of death penalty to pregnant women was prohibited by the 1922 Code, while a 1993 change banned capital punishment for women altogether. There are at least 3 known cases of female executions: Makarova, Ivanyutina and Borodkina.

=== Russian Federation ===
After the fall of the Soviet Union, the president of Russia established a pardon commission. This commission granted pardons in over 90% of death penalty cases between 1992 and 1994, but this rate sharply declined to 10% in 1995.

Death penalty in Russia, 1991–1996
| Year | Sentenced to death | Cases reviewed for pardon | Pardoned | Executed |
|---|---|---|---|---|
| 1991 | 147 | - | 37 | 15 |
| 1992 | 159 | 56 | 54 | 1 |
| 1993 | 157 | 153 | 149 | 4 |
| 1994 | 160 | 137 | 124 | 19 |
| 1995 | 143 | 56 | 5 | 86 |
| 1996 | 153 | 0 | 0 | 53 |

In 1996, to facilitate its entry into the Council of Europe, Russia ceased conducting executions. However, the country continued to issue death sentences, with 106 in 1997, 116 in 1998, and 19 in 1999.

== Current status ==
=== Statute limitations ===
Article 20 of the Russian Constitution states that everyone has the right to life, and that "until its abolition, the death penalty may only be passed for the most serious crimes against human life." Additionally, all such sentences require jury trial. The inclusion of the abolition wording has been interpreted by some as a requirement for capital punishment to be abolished in the future.

The current Penal Code permits the death penalty for five crimes:

- murder, with certain aggravating circumstances (article 105.2)
- attempted murder of a judge (article 295)
- attempted murder of a police officer (article 317)
- attempted murder of a state official (article 277)
- genocide (section 357)

No crime has a mandatory death sentence; each of the five sections mentioned above also permits life imprisonment, as well as a prison sentence of 8 to 30 years. Males under the age of 18 or over the age of 60 at the time of commission, along with all females, are ineligible for capital punishment.

The Penal Execution Code specifies that the execution is to be carried out "privately by shooting".

=== Moratorium ===
One of the absolute requirements of the Council of Europe for all members is the abolition of capital punishment. However, the council has accepted temporary moratoria. Consistent with this, on 25 January 1996, the Council required Russia to implement a moratorium immediately and fully abolish capital punishment within three years to approve its bid for inclusion in the organization. In a month, Russia agreed and became a member of the Council. Whether the moratorium has happened as a matter of legal right is controversial.

On 16 May 1996, President Boris Yeltsin issued a decree "for the stepwise reduction in the application of capital punishment in conjunction with Russia's entry into the Council of Europe", which is widely cited as de facto establishing such a moratorium. The decree called on the legislature to prepare a law that would abolish capital punishment, as well as a recommendation to reduce the number of capital crimes and require the authorities to treat those on death row humanely. Although the order may be read as not legally abolishing capital punishment, this was eventually the practical effect, and it was accepted as such by the Council of Europe as Russia was granted membership in the organization.

However, since executions continued in 1996 after Russia signed the agreement, the council was not satisfied and presented Russia with several ultimatums, threatening to expel the country if capital punishment continued to be carried out. In response, several more laws and orders were enacted, and Russia has not executed anyone since Golovkin's execution in August 1996. After the moratorium was announced and the maximum sentence was officially increased from 25 years to life in prison, multiple death row inmates committed suicide.

On 2 February 1999, the Constitutional Court of Russia issued a temporary stay on any executions for a rather technical reason, but granting the moratorium an unquestionable legal status for the first time. According to the Constitution, as quoted above, a death sentence may be pronounced only by a jury trial, which was not yet implemented in some regions of the country. The court found that such disparity makes death sentences illegal in any part of the country, even those that do have the process of trial by jury implemented. According to the ruling, no death sentence may be passed until all regions of the country have jury trials.

=== Proposed reinstatement ===
In April 2013, President Vladimir Putin said that lifting the moratorium was inadvisable. However, when Russia was suspended from the Council of Europe in the wake of the 2022 Russian invasion of Ukraine, and subsequently announced its intention to withdraw from the organisation, former President and Prime Minister Dmitry Medvedev endorsed restoring the death penalty in Russia. Russia was eventually expelled from the Council of Europe in March 2022.

Following the Crocus City Hall attack in March 2024, many senior members of United Russia called for the return of the death penalty in the country.

== Public opinion ==
A survey conducted in 2012 (on a sample of 3,000) found that 62 percent of the respondents favored a return to the use of the death penalty, and 21 percent still supported the moratorium. In this survey, five percent of the respondents supported the abolition of the death penalty, and 66 percent supported the death penalty as a valid punishment.

According to a 2013 survey by the Levada Center, 54 percent of the respondents favored an equal (38 percent) or greater (16 percent) use of the death penalty as before the 1996 moratorium, a decline from 68 percent in 2002 and 61 percent in 2012. This survey found that the death penalty now has a higher approval rating in urban areas (77 percent in Moscow for example), with men and among the elderly. According to the Levada Center figures, the proportion of Russians seeking abolition of the death penalty was 12 percent in 2002, 10 percent in 2012 and 11 percent in 2013. According to the same source, the proportion of Russians approving of the moratorium increased from 12 percent in 2002 to 23 percent in 2013.

A 2019 Levada Center poll found the number of Russians who support the death penalty's return had climbed to nearly half, with 49% of Russian respondents saying they would like to see the return of the death penalty, an increase from 44% in 2017. 19% said the death penalty should be abolished.

A 2024 poll found that 53% of Russians were in favour of restoring the death penalty, while 39% were against.

== Russian opinion on the practice in Europe ==
After two terrorists were executed in Belarus in 2012 for their role in the 2011 Minsk Metro bombing, the Russian Foreign Minister Sergey Lavrov said that he urged all European countries to join the moratorium, including Belarus. However, he said that it is an internal affair of each state, and that, despite condemning the execution, Russia still was a major supporter of the war on terror.

== Procedure ==
Historically, various types of capital punishment were used in Russia, such as hanging, breaking wheel, burning, beheading, flagellation by knout until death, etc. During the times of Ivan the Terrible, capital punishment often took exotic and torturous forms, impalement being one of its most common types. Certain crimes incurred specific forms of capital punishment, e.g. coin counterfeiters were executed by pouring molten lead into their throats, while certain religious crimes were punishable by burning alive.

In the times after Peter the Great, hanging for military men and shooting for civilians became the default means of execution, though certain types of non-lethal corporal punishment, such as lashing or caning, could result in the convict's death.

In the Soviet Union and post-Soviet Russia, convicts awaited execution for around 9–18 months since the first sentence. That was the time typically needed for two or three appeals to be processed through the Soviet juridical system, depending on the level of the court that first sentenced the convict to death. Shooting was the only legal means of execution, though the exact procedure has never been codified. Unlike most other countries, the execution did not involve any official ceremony: the convict was often given no warning and taken by surprise to eliminate fear, suffering, and resistance. Where warning was given, it was usually just a few minutes.

The process was usually carried out by a single executioner, usage of firing squads being limited to wartime executions. The most common method was to make the convict walk into a dead-end room and shoot him from behind in the back of the head with a handgun. In some cases, the convict could be forced down on his knees. Some prisons were rumored to have specially designed rooms with fire slits. Another method was to make the convict walk out of the prison building, where he was awaited by the executioner and a truck with the engine and headlamps turned on. The lights blinded and disoriented the convict, while the noise of the engine muffled the shot.

The bodies of the executed criminals and political dissidents were not given to the relatives, but rather buried in anonymous graves in undisclosed locations.

== See also ==
- Criminal Code of Russia
