= Svetlana Khodchenkova =

Russian actress

- Светлана Ходченкова
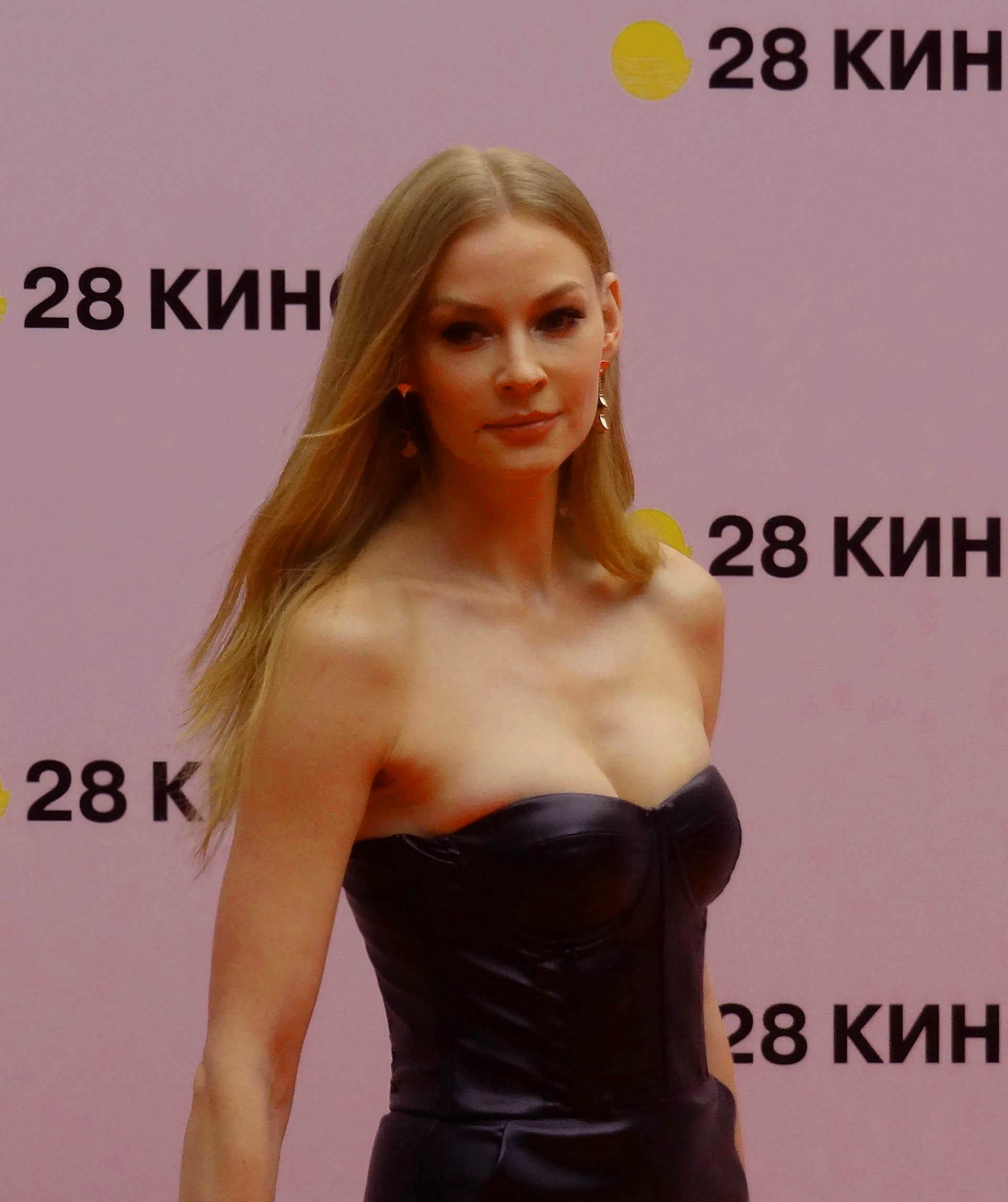
- Khodchenkova at the 28th Kinotavr Open Russian Film Festival in 2017
- Born: Svetlana Viktorovna Khodchenkova; 21 January 1983 (age 43); Moscow, RSFSR, USSR
- Education: Boris Shchukin Theatre Institute
- Occupation: Actress
- Years active: 2003–present
- Height: 180 cm (5 ft 11 in)
- Spouse: Vladimir Yaglych (m. 2005; div. 2010)

Svetlana Viktorovna Khodchenkova (Russian: Светла́на Ви́кторовна Хо́дченкова; born 21 January 1983) is a Russian film, television and theater actress. She is an Honored Artist of the Russian Federation (2018).

== Early life ==
Khodchenkova was born in Moscow, Russian SFSR, Soviet Union. She briefly worked for a modeling agency.

In 2005 Graduated from the Boris Shchukin Theatre Institute, where she studied under the direction of Mikhail Borisovich Borisov.

== Career ==
Khodchenkova’s debut role was in the film Bless the Woman (2003) directed by Stanislav Govorukhin. For this role she was nominated for "Nika" award as Best Actress. She continued her career in the role of a clairvoyant Cassandra historical television series Talisman of Love (2005). Khodchenkova played a ballerina in Pavel Sanaev’s film Kilometer Zero (2007).

In 2008, she starred in the television series Univer. at the Polish Film Festival she won the award for Best Actress in Little Moscow.

She is also known for her roles in box office films Love in the Big City (2009), its sequel, Love in the Big City 2 (2010), and Office Romance. Our Time (2011).

She starred in the TV series Lavrova's Method (2011), and appeared as Irina in Tinker Tailor Soldier Spy (2011). Khodchenkova attended the premiere of Tinker, Tailor, Soldier, Spy at the 68th Venice Film Festival, on September 5, 2011. She co-starred with Hugh Jackman in the 2013 superhero film The Wolverine as Viper, one of the film's antagonists.

In 2013, she starred in the television series SashaTanya. Khodchenkova played the leading role, Irina the Greek woman, in the historical action film Viking (2016).

== Personal life ==
On 13 December 2005, she married her classmate Vladimir Yaglych, a Russian actor. In 2010, they divorced. In May 2015, she was engaged to Moscow businessman Georgiy Petrishin. In February 2016, the couple called off the engagement.

== Filmography ==
=== Film ===
Year	Title	Role	Notes
2003	Bless the Woman	Vera	
2005	Not by Bread Alone	Nadezhda Sergeevna Drozdova	
2006	Four Taxidrivers and a Dog 2	Kozyrkina	
2007	Real Dad	Lyudmila	
2007	Kilometer Zero	Alina	
2008	Little Moscow	Wiera Swietłowa	
2009	Love in the Big City	Anastasia Igorevna Korshun	
2010	Love in the Big City 2	Anastasia Igorevna Korshun	
2011	Office Romance. Our Time	Lyudmila Prokofevna Kalugina	
2011	The Pregnant	prosecutor	
2011	Tinker Tailor Soldier Spy	Irina	
2011	Five Brides	Nastya Karpova	
2011	For you	Kira	
2012	Rzhevsky versus Napoleon	Natasha Rostova	
2012	8 First Dates	Taxi passenger	
2012	Surprise Me	Bagira	
2013	Metro	Irina Garina	
2013	The Wolverine	Viper	
2013	Isle of luck	Lena	
2013	Love in the Big City 3	Anastasia Igorevna Korshun	
2013	Vasilisa	Vasilisa Kozhina	
2014	The Champions	Svetlana Zhurova	
2014	The Adventurers	Katya	
2014	Love Does Not Love	Irina	
2014	Blog Mom First Grader	Masha	
2015	Lady of Csejte	Elizabeth Báthory	
2015	Horoscope for good luck	Elena Karyakina	
2015	The End of Beautiful Era	Marina	
2015	The Warrior	Ekaterina 'Katya' Rodina	
2016	Classmates	Vika	
2016	Viking	Irina, a greek, the wife of Yaropolk I Sviatoslavich	
2017	Life Ahead	Lyudmila	
2017	Blockbuster	Ira	
2018	Dovlatov	actress, Dovlatov's girlfriend	
2019	Hero	Mariya "Masha" Rakhmanova	
2020	On the Edge	Aleksandra 'Sasha' Pokrovskaya, a saber fencer	
2021	The North Wind	Matilda	
2021	Tell Her	Sveta	
2021	House Arrest	Nurse Nadya	
2022	It's Not Her Name	Lisa	
2025	The Wizard of the Emerald City	Bastinda	Based on the novel of the same name.

=== Television ===
Year	Title	Role	Notes
2005	Talisman of Love	Clairvoyant Cassandra	
2005	Realtor	Masha	
2005	Solitude Love	Irina	
2005	Carousel	Tamara Onegina	
2005	Pictures Hunters	Nezhdana	
2006	Stalin's wife	Zhenya Alliluyeva	Mini-Series
2006	My Prechistenka	Agniya Tikhomirova	
2006–12	Alias Albanian	Galina Ermolaeva	
2007	Last reproduction	Lena	Mini-Series
2008	Quiet family life	Mariya	
2008	Crazy Angel	Alena Nekrasova	
2009	When we were happy	Lena Sintsova	
2009	Traps	Liliana	Mini-Series
2009	Pharmacist	Lubov Nikolaevna	
2010	Robinson	Lena Balunova	
2010	Gang	Anna Egorova	
2011	Lavrova's Method	Ekaterina Andreevna Lavrova	
2012	Brief Guide To A Happy Life	Sasha Usova	
2012	Mosgaz	Irina	
2012	Lavrova's Method 2	Ekaterina Andreevna Lavrova	
2013	SashaTanya	Veronica	
2014	Kuprin	Zhenya	Mini-Series
2014	The Executioner	Irina	
2015	The Man in the High Castle	Zlatka Dzhenich	
2015	You All Infuriate Me	Sonia Bagretsova	
2015	The Road to Calvary	Liza Rastorgueva	
2018	House Arrest	Ilona Radchenko	
2023	Actresses	Polina	Mini-series

=== Theatre ===
- These free Butterflies (STD Theatre Centre (WTO) of the Russian Federation On Strastnom)
- Hospital Moulin Rouge (Independent Theater Project)
- Santa Claus - Bastard! (Independent Theater Project)
- Theatre with and without Rules (Independent Theater Project)
- Love Story (Independent Theater Project)
