= Vasilisa Kozhina =

Russian guerilla leader (1780–1840)

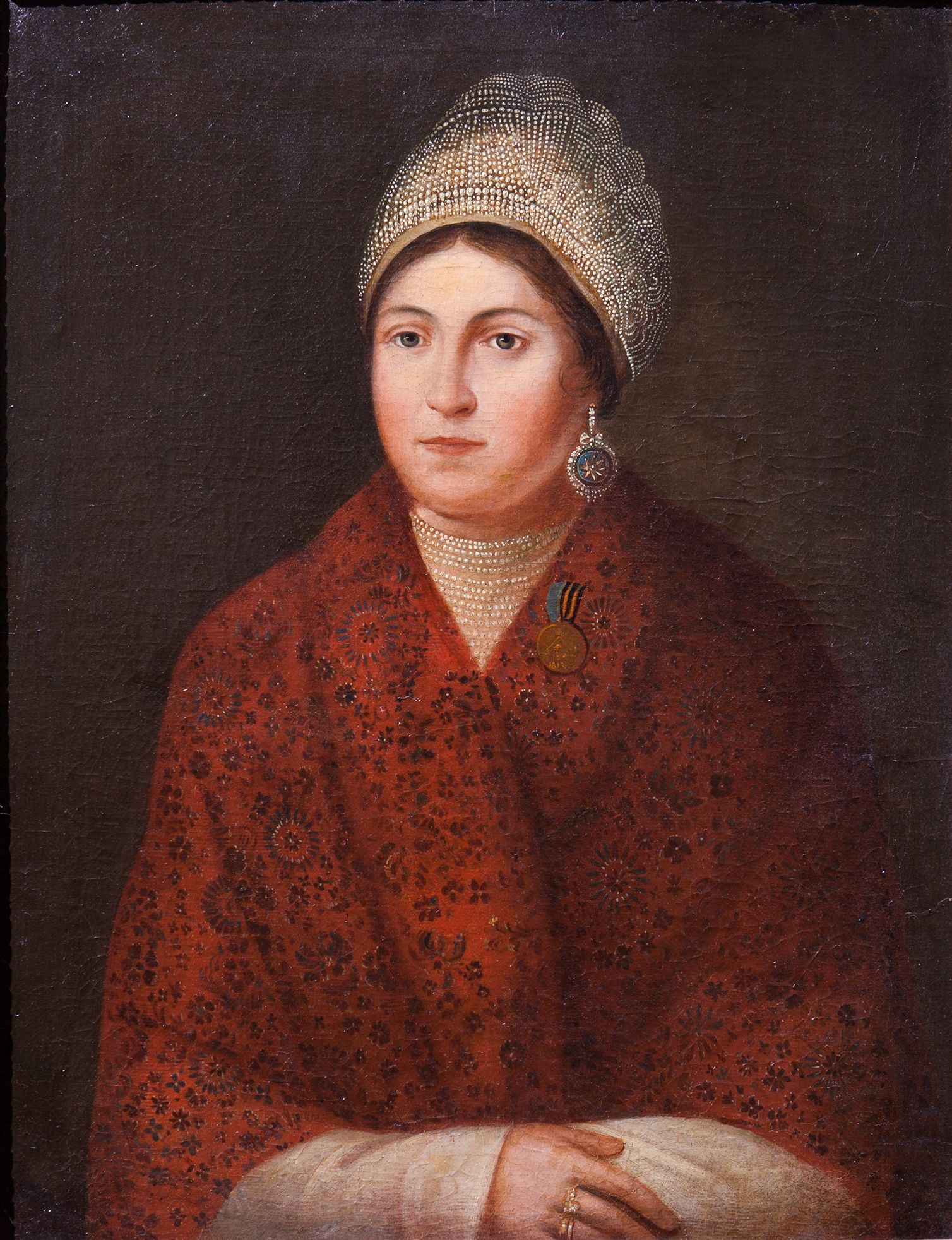
- Born: 1780; Sychyovsky Uyezd, Smolensk Governorate, Russian Empire
- Died: 1840 (aged 59–60) Sychyovsky Uyezd, Smolensk Governorate, Russian Empire
- Allegiance: Russian Empire
- Service years: 1812
- Rank: A peasant woman, A chief of a guerrilla detachment
- Commands: a Russian guerrilla detachment
- Conflicts: Patriotic War of 1812

Vasilisa Kozhina (Russian: Василиса Кожина, c. 1780—c. 1840) was a Russian guerrilla in the Patriotic War of 1812 who fought against the invading French Grande Armée.

== Biography ==
Vasilisa came from Russian peasants. She was a wife of Gorshkov, a starosta (an elder) of a village of Sychyovsky Uyezd of Smolensk Governorate.

During the French invasion of Russia from Vasilisa Kozhina organized in Sychyovsky Uyezd a partisan detachment of teenagers and women. All of them were armed with scythes, pitchforks, axes, bear spears and so on. During the retreat of Napoleon's troops from Moscow her guerrillas attacked French troops, captured prisoners and handed them to Russian units.

For this feat Vasilisa Kozhina was awarded a medal and given a monetary reward. In 1813, the artist Alexander Smirnov painted her sole portrait.

== Remembrance ==
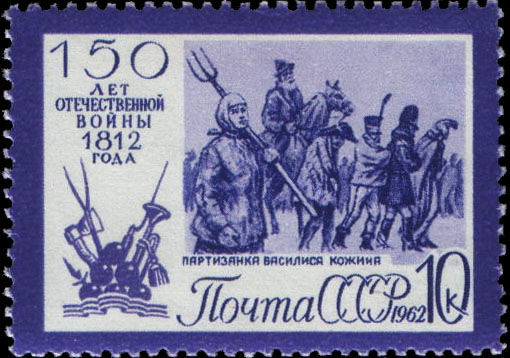
A Soviet postage stamp, 1962

- A Vasilisa Kozhina street in Sychyovka.
- A Vasilisa Kozhina street in Moscow, located near Filevsky Park and Bagrationovskaya subway stations.
- A station Vasilisino of Gagarinsky District of Smolensk Oblast is named in honor of Vasilisa Kozhina.
- There is a village, named in honor of Vasilisa Kozhina in Tver Oblast.
- In 1962 there was issued a postage stamp in honor of "a partisan Vasilisa Kozhina".
- Tolstoy credits her bravery in War and Peace

In 2012, for the 200th anniversary of the Patriotic War of 1812 Russian World Studios contracted Russian director Dmitry Meskhiev to make a four-part series about Kozhina, however the film was completed by Anton Sivers as Vasalisa in 2014.
