= Russian world (disambiguation) =

The "Russian world" (Russian: Русский мир, romanized: Russkiy mir) is the concept of social totality associated with Russian culture.

"Russian world" may also refer to:

- Russkiy Mir (St. Petersburg newspaper, 1859–1863), a Russian newspaper published in Saint Petersburg between 1859 and 1863
- Russkiy Mir (St. Petersburg newspaper, 1871–1880), a Russian newspaper published in Saint Petersburg between 1871 and 1880
- Russkiy Mir Foundation, a Russian foundation for promotion of Russian culture
- Russian World Studios, a Russian film and television production company
