= Antonina Makarova =

Russian Nazi collaborator, war criminal

- Makarova during World War II
- Born: Antonina Panfilova; 1 March 1920; Malaya Volkovka, Sychyovsky Uyezd, Smolensk Governorate, RSFSR
- Died: 11 August 1979 (aged 59); Bryansk, Bryansk Oblast, RSFSR, Soviet Union
- Cause of death: Execution by shooting
- Other name: Tonya the Machine-Gun Girl
- Spouse: Viktor Ginsburg (married 1945)
- Status: Executed
- Conviction: Treason
- Penalty: Death

Details
- Victims: ~168–1500+
- Span of crimes: 1943–1945
- Country: Russian Soviet Federative Socialist Republic
- Location: Lokot Autonomy
- Date apprehended: 1978

Antonina Makarovna Makarova (née Panfilova, Ginsburg by marriage, Russian: Антонина Макаровна Макарова, 1 March 1920 – 11 August 1979) was a Soviet war criminal and mass murderer who collaborated with Nazi Germany during World War II. From 1942 to 1943, she shot dead hundreds of Soviet partisans and their family members using a Russian M1910 Maxim machine gun. Makarova was tentatively identified by the Soviet KGB in 1976, and observed for a year before being arrested in 1978. Makarova was convicted of treason, sentenced to death, and executed in 1979. She was known as "Tonka the Machine-Gun Girl". Makarova was prosecuted for her role in at least 168 deaths, but was implicated in about 1,500 murders.

== Early life ==
Antonina Makarova was born in the small village of Malaya Volkovka in the Sychyovsky Uyezd of Smolensk Governorate. Her birth name was Antonina Panfilova. On her first day at school, Panfilova's name was written down as Makarova, from her father's first name, Makar. She was shy as a child and had forgotten her last name. As an adult, Makarova studied in Moscow. When World War II started, she joined the Red Army and became a volunteer nurse. During her military service, Makarova also learned how to use a machine gun.

== Collaboration with Nazi Germany ==
In the fall of 1941, Makarova was separated from Soviet troops. In January 1942, she was recruited by the local authorities at the town of Lokot, which was the capital of the Lokot Autonomy, a collaborationist statelet established by the Nazis in October 1941. Makarova was hired as a machine gunner to kill Russian POWs and partisans, as well as their families. Usually, Makarova was ordered to kill groups of 27 people at a time, which was the number of prisoners the local jailhouse could hold. In the evenings Makarova spent time with German officers along with local women who were working as prostitutes. In the summer of 1943, Germans found out that Makarova and the other women had a sexually transmitted disease and they were sent to a hospital in the rear.

== Post-war life ==
As the Red Army entered the Lokot region they found the remains of about 1,500 people. Soviet troops captured and killed many Nazi collaborators, but Makarova, who was at a hospital behind the German lines, was not among them. In 1945, Makarova married a Jewish Russian war veteran named Viktor Ginsburg, whose entire family had been murdered by Germans and Soviet collaborators during the war. They settled in Lepiel, a town in Soviet Belarus, and had two daughters, one in 1947, and the other a few years later. Antonina and her husband lived as respected citizens enjoying all the privileges granted to war veterans. Antonina was once invited to a school to give a speech to students.

== Trial and execution ==
Makarova after her arrest in 1978

The KGB kept the case open for many years but could not find the whereabouts of the "right" Antonina Makarova. In 1976, a Soviet Army officer named Panfilov was registering some documents of his relatives in order to get a visa. He found out that everyone in his family had the last name Panfilov save one: a woman named Antonina Makarova (Ginsburg after marriage). She was later recognized by several witnesses who had known Makarova during the war. Knowing the risk of wrongfully slandering a war veteran and destroying their reputation, the KGB spent a year carefully observing Makarova. They brought people to Lepiel who knew and could identify the woman known as "Tonka the Machine-Gun Girl". They were former lovers and collaborators who had served time in Gulags. After the witnesses affirmed their suspicions, the KGB arrested Makarova.

Makarova's husband was confused by her arrest, and insisted that the charges had to be a mistake. After investigators showed him that the evidence of her guilt was overwhelming, he went into a depression.

Throughout her interrogation, Makarova remained calm, believing that due to the lapse of time, she would only serve a few years in prison. However, she was convicted of treason for her role in 168 murders and sentenced to death in November 1978. Makarova was executed by shooting on 11 August 1979. She was one of only three women legally executed by the Soviet Union after the death of Joseph Stalin, the others being Berta Borodkina for corruption and serial killer Tamara Ivanyutina.
