= Vasilisa (2014 film) =

- Theatrical release poster
- Directed by: Anton Sivers
- Screenplay by: Anoush Vardanyan; Oleg Malovichko
- Produced by: Andrey Smirnov; Yuri Sapronov; Mikhail Vavilov
- Starring: Svetlana Khodchenkova; Jérôme Cusin; Andrey Ilin; Vladimir Metveev; Alexey Barabash; Vitaliy Kovalenko
- Cinematography: Ilya Averbakh
- Music by: Anton Belyaev
- Production company: Russian World Studios
- Release date: December 4, 2014 (Russia)
- Running time: 100 minutes
- Country: Russia
- Language: Russian
- Budget: $7 million

Vasilisa (Russian: Василиса) is a 2014 Russian film and TV mini-series for Russian World Studios (RWS) based on the life of Napoleonic War partisan Vasilisa Kozhina directed by Anton Sivers. Russian World Studios originally contracted Dmitry Meskhiev to direct the film, with the lesser known Anton Sivers taking over after Meskhiev pulled out.

== Plot ==
Serf Vasilisa is in a secret romantic relationship with nobleman Ivan Ryazanov. He promises her freedom and a wedding, but since his childhood has been engaged to another girl from the nobility, whose friendship he retains. Having convinced herself that Ryazanov is likely to marry his fiancée, Vasilisa is persuaded by her sister to marry instead the village elder, Kozhin, who has been pursuing her. As Vasilisa resigns herself to a loveless marriage and the unromantic, unrelenting hard work of village life, Napoléon Bonaparte's armies invade Russia and the Patriotic War begins.

Heartbroken by Vasilisa's marriage, Ryazanov departs with a detachment of Russian soldiers for the front and throws himself into the fighting. When she learns of the destruction of Ryazanov's regiment in a bloody French victory against the Russians, a grieving Vasilisa is obliged to admit both to herself and to god the depth of her devotion to the nobleman. With no way of knowing whether Ryazanov has survived, Vasilisa pledges he will be avenged against the French.

Emboldened by their early victory, the French occupy greater amounts of Russian territory, and take military possession of where Vasilisa lives. The French forces murder peasants, impound food, rape women and execute any resistors. Outraged by the inaction of the local Russian landowner to these abuses of their people, Vasilisa organises the local peasants into partisans and begins a guerrilla war against the full might of the invading army.

== Cast ==
- Svetlana Khodchenkova as Vasilisa Kozhina
- Jérôme Cusin
- Andrey Ilin as Elagin
- Vladimir Metveev as Russian Marshall Mikhail Kutuzov
- Alexey Barabash as Russian Emperor Alexander 1st
- Vitaliy Kovalenko as Napoléon Bonaparte
