= Bless the Woman =

- Directed by: Stanislav Govorukhin
- Written by: Vladimir Valutsky
- Produced by: Yekaterina Maskina
- Starring: Svetlana Khodchenkova
- Cinematography: Lomer Akhvlediani
- Edited by: Vera Kruglova
- Music by: Eugen Doga
- Distributed by: Vertikal; Mosfilm
- Release date: September 4, 2003
- Running time: 114 minutes
- Country: Russia
- Language: Russian

Bless the Woman (Russian: Благословите женщину, romanized: Blagoslovite zhenshchinu) is a Russian film that was released in 2003. The film is based on the novel Hostess, by Irina Grekova.

== Plot ==
The film begins in a small seaside village in the early 1930s. A young girl falls in love with an older visiting military officer named Larichev and goes with him to his place of service. Following always and everywhere for her beloved husband (Central Asia, the North, the Soviet-Finnish War, the beginning of the Great Patriotic War), the heroine fully sacrifices herself to him, obeying his orders without discussion. Captivity, suspicion and the ruin of his military career (dismissal from the army) break Larichev's strong character, bringing death from heart failure. The heroine's life without him is a new beginning.

== Cast ==
- Svetlana Khodchenkova as Vera
- Aleksandr Baluev as Larichev
- Olga Beryozkina as Masha
- Aleksandr Mikhailov as Yurlov
- Alexandra Kosteniuk as Vera (Masha's daughter)
- Irina Kupchenko as Anna Stepanovna
- Vitaly Khaev as Ryabinin
- Inna Churikova as Kunina
- Stanislav Govorukhin as Divisional Commander
- Anatoliy Kotenyov as colonel
- Maksim Galkin as actor
- Nina Maslova as doctor

== Awards and nominations ==
- Nominations for Nika Award for Best Feature Film and Best Actress (Svetlana Khodchenkova) (2004).
- Nika Award for Best Supporting Actress (Inna Churikova) (2004).
- Pacific Meridian for People's Choice Award (2003).
