= Tamara Ivanyutina =

Soviet serial killer

- Born: Tamara Antonovna Maslenko; 1941; Tula, Russian SFSR, Soviet Union
- Died: 6 December 1990 (aged 49); Lukyanivska Prison, Kyiv, Ukrainian SSR, Soviet Union
- Cause of death: Execution by shooting
- Other name: "The Kyiv Poisoner"
- Status: Executed
- Conviction: Murder with aggravating circumstances
- Penalty: Death

Details
- Victims: 9
- Span of crimes: 1976–1987
- Country: Soviet Union

Tamara Antonovna Ivanyutina (Russian: Тама́ра Анто́новна Иваню́тина) (née Maslenko, 1941–1990) was a Soviet serial killer and mass murderer who used the extremely toxic poison thallium in her killings. She was the target of a wide-scale investigation in Kyiv during the 1980s.

== Biography ==
Tamara Maslenko was born in a large family as one of six children, in which her parents always told her that material security is the main thing in life. Although forensic psychiatric examination recognized Ivanyutina as sane, she was noted as self-centred, vindictive and resentful. During the investigations into the poisonings, it turned out that Ivanyutina had been convicted of speculation, and obtained employment as a dishwasher in a school cafeteria using a fake employment record book because as a former convict, she was banned from work in educational institutions.

Chemistry teacher Viktor Stadnik, who suffered from Ivanyutina's actions, noted such traits of her character as "perseverance and arrogance", as well as rudeness and lack of discipline.

== Murders ==
Between 17 and 18 March 1987, several pupils and employees of School #16 in the Podilskyi District in Kyiv were hospitalized with signs of food poisoning. Two children – Sergei Panibrat and Andrei Kuzmenko – and two adults died almost immediately, while the remaining 9 people were in intensive care. Doctors initially suspected influenza or an intestinal infection, but some time later, the hair began to fall out from the victims, which is not typical for such diseases.

Poisoning was suspected, and a criminal investigation and an investigative team were established. The investigators, after interviewing the survivors, found out that they all felt unwell by having lunch the day before in the school cafeteria, after eating kasha and liver. When the question arose if there was quality control in the school canteen, it was found that a dietitian named Natalia Kukharenko (according to other sources, Kukarenko) had died two weeks before the events, according to official data from a heart disease. However, the circumstances of Kukharenko's death caused doubts among the investigators, and due to this, her body was exhumed. As a result of corresponding studies, traces of thallium were found in corpse tissues. After that, searches were carried out for all persons who had access to the kitchen, including in the house Tamara Ivanyutina lived, who worked as a dishwasher in the dining room of School N#16.

During the search, a "small but very heavy jar" was found in Ivanyutina's house. It interested operatives and investigators and was sent for examination afterwards. A laboratory study showed that the can contained Clerici solution – a highly toxic solution based on thallium compounds used in some branches of geology.

Ivanyutina was arrested and initially wrote a confession, confessing to the poisoning in the school canteen on 16 March 1987. The reason for the crime, according to Ivanyutina, was that the sixth graders who dined in the dining room refused to set up tables and chairs, and "she decided to punish them". However, she later stated that the confessions were made up from investigators who pressured her, and refused to give further testimony.

== Investigation ==
Further investigation of the "Ivanyutina-Maslenko-Matzobory case" showed that Ivanyutina and her family (sister and parents) used thallium for poisoning for 11 years (since 1976); and did not poison as a mercenary goal, but simply because of personal dislikes. The family members purchased the Clerici solution from a friend who worked at a geological institute, explaining to her that the poison was for killing rats. The acquaintance admitted that for 15 years she had given Ivanyutina, her sister and parents a portion of the substance at least nine times. At the beginning of her criminal activities, Ivanyutina poisoned her first husband to get his apartment. After his death, she married a second time, but then poisoned her father-in-law and mother-in-law (who died at an interval of two days), later poisoning her second husband in small portions, to take possession of her husband's parents' house with a plot of land.

In September 1986, Ivanyutina got a job as a dishwasher for the school. According to investigators, she needed this work in order to gain access to food and food waste, since she kept a large farm with pigs and chickens. During her time in the dining room, Ivanyutina poisoned (in addition to the previous poisonings) the school party organizer Ekaterina Arsentyevna Scherban (who died), and the chemistry teacher Stadnik (who survived), who had prevented her from stealing food from the canteen, and two first and fifth grade students (who both survived), who had asked her for the remnants of cutlets for their pets.

The investigation proved that Tamara's elder sister, Nina Matzobory, using the same solution, had poisoned her husband and taken possession of their Kyiv apartment. Numerous poisonings were committed by their parents as well: in particular, they killed a neighbour in a communal apartment who was watching television at a loud volume, and a cousin, who made remarks about a toilet.

While detained, Maria Maslenko explained her life position to her cellmates: "To achieve what you want, you do not need to write complaints, but to treat everybody as friends. But for especially harmful ones, just add poison to food". The geography of the criminal activities of the family was not limited to Ukraine; it was proven that some of the crimes committed by them in the RSFSR; in particular, her father Anton, while in Tula, poisoned his cousin by mixing poison in her moonshine. Also, members of the family poisoned neighbors' pets.

== Trial and sentence ==
45-year-old Tamara Ivanyutina, her older sister Nina Matzobory, as well as their parents - Anton Mitrofanovich and Maria Fedorovna Maslenko, appeared before the court on charges of committing numerous poisonings, including fatalities. The investigators and the court found that the family for 11 years, in selfish interests, and also personal hostility, committed numerous murders and attempted murders to kill various persons by poisoning them.

According to the current deputy chairman of the Constitutional Court of Ukraine, S.M. Vinokurov, who worked during the investigation as a senior investigator for particularly important cases in the city prosecutor's office in Kyiv, proving that this was the largest case of thallium poisonings fixed in the USSR. In total, 40 cases of poisonings committed by the family were proven, 13 of which were fatal. At the same time, the largest number of poisonings (9) and assassination attempts (20) was committed personally by Tamara Ivanyutina. The trial lasted about a year, Ivanyutina did not admit her guilt and refused to apologise to the victims' families. All defendants were found guilty of murder and attempted assassination committed through poisoning.

== Execution ==
Ivanyutina was sentenced to death and executed in 1990. Her accomplices were sentenced to various terms of imprisonment: Nina was sentenced to 15 years (her further fate is unknown) and their parents to 10 and 13 years, both dying in custody. During the investigation, Ivanyutina admitted that her dream was to buy a GAZ Volga car. She also tried to bribe an investigator, promising him "a lot of gold". Refusing to admit her guilt, she explained at her trial that she did not have "a good upbringing". In reality, her parents had taught her to poison those who were unwanted.

This unusual case was one of only three confirmed instances of a woman executed in the post-Stalin Soviet Union – the others were the 1979 execution of Antonina Makarova for her activities on the WWII Eastern Front, and the 1985 execution of Berta Borodkina for embezzlement and bribery. Ivanyutina's case is still included in Ukraine's training materials for criminal procedures.

== In the media ==
- The documentary series "Слідство вели…" — "Отруйна школа" "The investigation was conducted ..." - "Poisonous school" (issue No. 205, 16 June 2012), NTV.

== See also ==
- List of serial killers by country
