= Office Romance. Our Time =

- Directed by: Sarik Andreasyan
- Written by: Nikolay Kovbas; Sarik Andreasyan; Volodymyr Zelenskyy; Sergey Shefir; Boris Shefir
- Produced by: Sergey Livnev; Georgiy Malkov; Andrey Yakovlev
- Starring: Svetlana Khodchenkova; Volodymyr Zelenskyy; Marat Basharov
- Cinematography: Pyotr Bratersky
- Music by: Dr. Tash
- Production companies: Kvartal 95 Studio; Leopolis
- Distributed by: Universal Pictures International
- Release date: March 17, 2011
- Running time: 87 minutes
- Countries: Russia, Ukraine
- Language: Russian
- Budget: $5 million
- Box office: $11 829 672

Office Romance. Our Time (Russian: «Служебный роман. Наше время», romanized: Sluzhebny roman. Nashe vremya) is a 2011 Russian-Ukrainian romantic comedy film directed by Sarik Andreasyan. It is a remake of the 1977 Soviet film Office Romance, directed by Eldar Ryazanov.

== Plot ==
Lyudmila Kalugina is a tough businesswoman and owner of a credit rating agency. Anatoly Novoseltsev, a financial analyst, devoted biker, and father of two, works at her agency. Novoseltsev's colleague and friend, Olga Petrovna Ryzhova, encourages him to aim for a department head position. Ryzhova, who once dated the agency's new deputy director Yuri Samokhvalov, studied with both men at university. Reconnecting with his old friend, Samokhvalov uses his influence to help Novoseltsev advance by suggesting he flirt with Kalugina to soften her stance. Despite these efforts, Kalugina remains uninterested in promoting him and views him as a lackluster employee. Samokhvalov arranges a trip to Turkey with the hope of sparking a connection between the two, but things take a turn when a drunken Novoseltsev, frustrated by her indifference, calls her "hard" and "heartless" in front of the group and even pushes her into a pool.

The next day, Novoseltsev and Kalugina find themselves alone in a stalled cable car, where he tries to apologize, only to make her cry by bringing up her loneliness. Attempting to comfort her, he ends up forming a tentative bond. His initial flirtation for career advancement gradually turns into genuine feelings. Meanwhile, Ryzhova rekindles old feelings for Samokhvalov, but their past becomes problematic when a conflict with Novoseltsev reveals Ryzhova in a compromising position with Samokhvalov, who turns out to be an agent from a rival agency aiming to ruin Kalugina's reputation. In a final act of sabotage, Samokhvalov swaps Novoseltsev's presentation flash drive with a scandalous video. Novoseltsev races to the presentation on his bike, but after losing the drive, he must improvise with hand gestures to convey his report. Following the successful presentation, he proposes to Kalugina using financial terms, and she responds via a note on a tablet, displayed for all to see.

In the epilogue, Novoseltsev and Kalugina ride a motorbike together through Moscow, symbolizing their newfound partnership.

== Cast ==
=== Lead roles ===
- Svetlana Khodchenkova – Lyudmila Prokofievna Kalugina
- Volodymyr Zelenskyy – Anatoly Efremovich Novoseltsev
- Marat Basharov – Yuri Samokhvalov
- Anastasia Zavorotnyuk – Olga Ryzhova
- Pavel Volya – Vadik, secretary of Kalugina
- Sofya Hilkova – Katya Novoseltseva, the eldest daughter of Anatoly Novoseltsev
- Veronika Vakulinskaya – Masha Novoseltseva, the youngest daughter of Anatoly Novoseltsev

=== Supporting roles ===
- Nikita Salopin – investor
- Yevhen Koshovyi – Stepan, System Administrator
- Sergey Pomerantsev – Valery Volkov, employee
- Ekaterina Mikhailova – saleswoman in the store
- Denis Onshin – office employee
- Irina Frolova – employee of the office
- Olesya Ostapenko is an office worker
- Anna Azarova – "badger"
- Ivan Okhlobystin – psychologist
- Alika Smekhova – woman on the session
- Timur Rodriguez – host of the party
- Aleksey Klimushkin
- Dmitry Khrustalev – guest at the party
- Sergey Kazanin – the presenter of the presentation
- Maria Syomkina – Anna, hostess of a competing agency

== Reception ==
The film received mostly negative reviews in Russian media.
