= Kilometer Zero (film) =

- Directed by: Pavel Sanayev
- Written by: Pavel Sanayev
- Produced by: Dmitry Nesterov
- Starring: Alexander Lymarev; Ivan Zhidkov; Svetlana Khodchenkova
- Cinematography: Alexander Nosovsky
- Edited by: Igor Litvinsky; Pavel Sanayev
- Music by: Vsevolod Saksonov; Andrey Komissarov; Mattias Lindblom
- Production companies: Cinemotion Group; Studio Globe
- Distributed by: Cascade Film
- Release date: 2007
- Running time: 86 minutes
- Country: Russia
- Language: Russian

Kilometer Zero (Russian: Нулевой километр, translit. Nulevoy kilometr) is a 2007 romantic thriller film by Pavel Sanayev, released in Russia on October 25, 2007.

== Plot ==
Kostya and Oleg come to Moscow from Murmansk. Kostya dreams of becoming a professional music video director, Oleg is aiming high to a respectable capital citizen. They make friends and support each other, going, however, their own ways.

By chance, Oleg and Kostya meet Shepilov, a successful businessman. At a glance he sees Oleg is talented in talking people into doing what they do not need. Shepilov offers Oleg a job with a realty company. The trouble is that Kostya falls in love with Alina, Shepilov's former fiancée, who he still hopes to get back to love him.

Shepilov cancels Alina's performance that had to be the crucial one for her further career. However, Kostya makes a video for Alina that soon brings her a contract offer from London.

Alina now needs to arrive at a conclusion for either love or career as the contract forces her to make a break with Kostya. Kostya in his turn gets to choose whether to go to London with Alina or to accept a job offer from a well-known producer and achieve what he dreamed of. Oleg as well must decide what is more important to him — friendship or his respectable status.

Oleg finds out the business that made him turn away from his friend is spattered with blood. Oleg is in danger and Kostya is the only one to help him out. But both Kostya and Alina themselves are already chased after as they might witness against Shepilov. So now Kostya does not only have to save himself and the girl her loves, but also his friend who betrayed him.

== Cast ==
- Svetlana Khodchenkova as Alina
- Alexander Lymarev as Kostya
- Konstantin Kryukov as Artur
- Ivan Zhidkov as Oleg
- Dmitry Nagiev as Sergey Borisovich
- Yuri Tsurilo as Bondarev
- Elena Sanayeva as Olga Sergeyevna
- Alexander Efimov as Shepilov
- Boris Tenin as Isaev
- Andrey Malakhov (cameo)
- Fedor Bondarchuk (cameo)
