= Irina Grekova =

Russian writer and mathematician (1907–2002)

Elena Sergeevna Ventsel (Russian: Еле́на Серге́евна Ве́нтцель; maiden name Dolgintseva, 21 March 1907, Reval — 15 April 2002, Moscow), known by the pen name Irina Grekova (often shortened to I. Grekova, this pen name is a pun on y in mathematics, which sounds in russian as "igrek"), was a Soviet writer and mathematician. She held a Ph.D. in mathematics, and wrote several influential textbooks on probability theory, game theory, and operations research.

== Biography ==
Her father taught mathematics and her mother taught literature. Believing that higher mathematics was actually simpler than arithmetic, he began giving her lessons when she was only seven or eight.

In 1923, when she was sixteen, she entered Petrograd University (now Saint Petersburg State University), where she studied with Boris Delaunay, Ivan Vinogradov, Gury Kolosov and Grigorii Fichtenholz, among others. In 1929, she graduated from the Physics and Mathematics Department.

From 1935 to 1969, she worked at the Zhukovsky Air Force Engineering Academy then, from 1969 to 1987, at the Moscow State University of Railway Engineering. She began writing prose in 1962 and became a member of the Union of Soviet Writers in 1967.

Grekova's novella, "The Ship of Widows," told the story of five widows who shared a kommunalka together "from the time immediately following WWII until the 1960s."

Her husband, Dimitri Ventsel, was a Major General and head of the ballistics department at the Air Force Academy. Her son Alexander D. Wentzell is a Russian-American mathematician.

In 2003, her novel Hostess was filmed as Bless the Woman; directed by Stanislav Govorukhin.

== Works in English ==
- The Ship of Widows, translated by Cathy Porter, European Classics ISBN 0-8101-1144-6
- Russian Women (Two Stories), translated by Michel Petrov, HBJ ISBN 0-15179-056-6
- Wentzel E. Probability Theory (first steps) (Imported Pubn, 1975) ISBN 082853196X ISBN 978-0828531962
- Elena S. Wentzel Operations Research MIR, 1983 ISBN 5030002278 ISBN 978-5030002279
- E. Wentzel and L. Ovcharov Applied Problems in Probability Theory, Mir Publishers, 1987 ISBN 0828533229 ISBN 978-0828533225
