= It's Not Her Name =

- Directed by: Veta Geraskina
- Screenplay by: Veta Geraskina; Lilya Akopyan
- Produced by: Katerina Mikhaylova; Svetlana Khodchenkova; Konstantin Fam; Oxana Shalamanova; Polina Schlicht; Andrey Annensky; Aleksey Lushin; Tatyana Moiseyeva
- Starring: Svetlana Khodchenkova; Jakob Diehl; Ekaterina "Katya" Fedina; Alexandra Krotkova
- Cinematography: Anton Gromov
- Edited by: Kristina Shahnazaryan
- Music by: Stanislav Sharifulin
- Production company: Vega Film
- Distributed by: White Nights
- Release date: February 3, 2022 (Russia)
- Running time: 95 minutes
- Countries: Russia, Bulgaria
- Language: Russian

It's Not Her Name, also known as Another Name (Original title: У нее другое имя) is a 2022 Russian thriller drama film directed by Veta Geraskina, from a screenplay by Lilya Akopyan and Veta Geraskina. It stars Svetlana Khodchenkova, Jakob Diehl, and introducing Katya Fedina. The films concept was presented at the 72nd International Cannes Film Festival.

== Synopsis ==
The film follows Lisa, a woman who abandoned her child at birth and has spent the last twenty-three years obsessively searching for her. Her quest leads her to a young girl whom she believes to be her long-lost daughter, left at an orphanage. As Lisa begins to spy on the girl and infiltrates her life, she eventually discovers that this is not her daughter. However, unable to let go of the motherly role she has assumed, Lisa becomes increasingly determined to protect the girl, adopting a ruthless demeanor. The two lonely souls form a bond, with Lisa becoming a mother figure and the girl, a daughter.

== Cast ==
- Svetlana Khodchenkova as Lisa
- Jakob Diehl as Petr
- Ekaterina "Katya" Fedina as Lisa's daughter
- Alexandra Krotkova as Ulya

== Production ==
In January 2019 it was announced that Svetlana Khodchenkova and Jakob Diehl had joined the cast of the film. Khodchenkova is an ambassador to the brand Bulgari. The film is produced by Konstantin Fam, Svetlana Khodchenkova, Katerina Mikhaylova, Polina Schlicht, and Oxana Shalamanova.

=== Filming ===
Principal photography began in March 2019.
