= Sychyovsky Uyezd =

Sychevsky Uyezd on the map of Smolensk Governorate

Sychyovsky Uyezd (Сычёвский уезд) was one of the subdivisions of the Smolensk Governorate of the Russian Empire. It was situated in the northeastern part of the governorate. Its administrative centre was Sychyovka.

== Demographics ==
At the time of the Russian Empire Census of 1897, Sychyovsky Uyezd had a population of 100,737. Of these, 99.7% spoke Russian, 0.1% Yiddish, 0.1% Romani, 0.1% German and 0.1% Polish as their native language.
