= Berta Borodkina =

Soviet briber (1927–1985)

- Born: Berta Naumovna Korol; June 6, 1927; Bila Tserkva, Ukrainian SSR, Soviet Union
- Died: 1985 (aged 57–58); Novocherkassk, Russian SFSR, Soviet Union
- Status: Executed by shooting
- Conviction: Embezzlement
- Penalty: Death

Details
- Span of crimes: 1974–1982
- Country: Soviet Union
- Date apprehended: 1982

Berta Naumovna Borodkina (Russian: Бе́рта Нау́мовна Боро́дкина; née Korol; 1927–after 1984) was a Soviet official in charge in trade related to catering, executed for embezzling. She was the head of a trust of restaurants and canteens in Gelendzhik, honored worker of trade and public catering of the RSFSR. Borodkina had the nickname Iron Bella.

She was the second of the three women executed in Soviet Union in the period from 1960 to 1987. She was sentenced to death for systematic theft of socialist property.

== Biography ==
Borodkina began working in the field of trade with the posts of barmaid and waitress, and was subsequently appointed to the position of director of canteen. In 1974 she was appointed director of the Gelendzhik trust of restaurants and canteens. She was arrested in 1982. According to the version of investigative authorities, in the period from 1974 to 1982, she was engaged in speculation on an especially large scale. (Note: "speculation on an especially large scale" (спекуляция в особо крупных размерах) is a category of crime in Soviet law)

During the search, Borodkina found many valuable things, as well as large amounts of money. According to Anton Lopatin, senior assistant to the prosecutor of the Krasnodar Krai for media relations, resident's housing resembled museum stores, which contained numerous precious jewelry, furs, crystal products, and bedding sets that were in short supply at that time. In addition, according to the testimony of the member of the prosecutor's office of the Krasnodar Krai Vladimir Nagorny, she kept large sums of money at home, which the investigators found in the most unexpected places – in radiators and under the carpets in the rooms, rolled up banks in the basement, in the warehouses backyard bricks. The total amount seized during the search amounted to more than 500,000 roubles.

It is believed that in total during her activities she received from partners in goods and cash worth more than a million roubles. In 1984, she was sentenced to death. Her exact date of death, or if she was even executed at all, is unknown. Records indicate that that her final appeal was denied on July 1 1985, but no further records are known to exist.
