= Russian World Studios =

Coordinates: 55°41′3″N 37°33′16″E

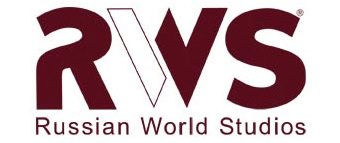

Russian World Studios was founded in 1984 by Yuri Sapronov and Andrei Smirnov, and is one of the largest film and television production companies in the Russian market. As of 1992, the company had produced or serviced over 400 film and television projects. The studio has worked with Sony Pictures Television International, Hallmark Entertainment, HBO Films, and Beacon Pictures. RWS offers a range of film production services as well as their own distribution department, which sells in-house film and TV series on the international market. The company's film studios are located in Moscow and St. Petersburg.

At the end of 2007 RWS joined JSFC "Sistema", the largest diversified holding company in Russia. This new partnership has allowed RWS to focus on three main areas of growth: studio facilities, including the expansion of the new St. Petersburg studio; production, including the expansion and efficient use of the content library; and distribution of content across current and emerging media platforms.

In 2012, after being located on the premises of former automotive giant ZIL for decades, RWS decided to open another studio in St. Petersburg.

== Top Executives ==
Yuri Sapronov Yuri Anatolievich Sapronov is a co-founder and the current CEO of Russian World Studios.

Olga Sinelshchikova Olga Sinelshchikova is the International Vice President of Russian World Studio.

Dmitry Meskhiyev Dmitry Meskhiyev is the marketing director of Russian World Studios.

== Film Production Services ==
- Script review, editing, and adaptation
- Focus groups
- Screenwriter referral
- Stage rental
- Location scouting and obtaining location shooting permission
- Rental house for production equipment
- Transportation and production vehicles
- Casting
- Decoration construction and rental
- Catering
- Post-production services

== Production filmography ==
Film

- Vasilisa (2014)
- Mission: Impossible – Ghost Protocol (2011), Russian unit
- Kaleidoscope (2008)
- Antidope (2007)
- Spirit (2007)

Television

- The Detective Brothers (2008)
- Love is Not As it Looks (2008)
- Atlantis (2008)
- Sea Patrol (2008)
- Ginger (2008)
- Champion (2008)
- Young and Wicked (2006)
- Pain (2006)
- Zona (2006)
- Poor Anastasya (2004)
- Cobra Antiterror (2003)
- Ambulance (2003)
- Cobra (2001)
- Maroseyka, 12 (1998)

== Achievements ==
Film

- Cobra

A memorial plaque at the 55th Film Festival in Salerno (Italy)(2001)

The Spirit (co-produced with Studio Eight)

Cinema for Peace Award for Best Film at Berlinale (2008)
Special screening at MIFF (2007)
Special screening at the Los Angeles Short Film Festival (2007)

Television

- Snow Angel

TEFI (Russian National Television Awards for professional achievement in television broadcasting Award) (2008)

Atlantis

“Best TV Drama Series” Nomination at Monte Carlo Television Festival (2008)
“Best Telenovela and Serial Program” Nomination at BANFF World Television Festival in Canada

- Pain

“Best TV Drama Series” Nomination at Monte Carlo Television Festival (2007)
“Best TV Drama Series” Nomination at Seoul Drama Awards (2007)

- Zona

“Best TV Drama Series” Nomination at Monte Carlo Television Festival (2006)

- Poor Nastya

TEFI (Russian National Television Awards for professional achievement in television broadcasting Award) for the best production design (A. Boym, A. Burkov, I. Lapteva) (2004)

== Distribution ==
The RWS Distribution Department was formed in 2005 to distribute in-house projects throughout all operating and emerging platforms. The RWS catalogue includes products of various genres and formats including television series, feature films and television movies. In addition, Russian and international channels have acquired rights to air some of their programs, including Channel One (Russia), CTC (Russian Federation), 1+1 (Ukraine), Fox Life and Channel 9 (Israel).
