= Nika Award for Best Picture =

Russian film award

- Country: Russia
- Presented by: Russian Academy of Cinema Arts and Science
- First award: 1988
- Currently held by: The Wind (2025)
- Website: Official site of the Russian Academy of Cinema Arts and Science

The Nika Award for Best Picture (Russian: Ника за лучший игровой фильм) is given annually by the Russian Academy of Cinema Arts and Science and presented at the Nika Awards.

This award goes to the producers and directors of the Russian film.

In 2022, nominees were announced, but the Award ceremony was postponed and, eventually, cancelled.

The Award ceremony was also cancelled in 2023.

In the following lists, the titles and names in bold with a light blue background are the winners and recipients respectively; those not in bold are the nominees. The year with a light pink background is the one when nominees were announced, but the Award ceremony was not held.

== Winners and nominees ==
=== 1980s ===
| Year | International title | Original title | Transliterated title (per BGN/PCGN standard) | Director(s) | Ref(s) |
|---|---|---|---|---|---|
| 1988 | **Repentance** | Покаяние | Pokayaniye | Tengiz Abuladze | |
| 1988 | The Long Farewell | Долгие проводы | Dolgie provody | Kira Muratova | |
| 1988 | Plumbum, or The Dangerous Game | Плюмбум, или опасная игра | Plyumbum, ili Opasnaya igra | Vadim Abdrashitov | |
| 1989 | **The Cold Summer of 1953** | Холодное лето пятьдесят третьего... | Kholodnoe leto pyatdesyat tretego | Aleksandr Proshkin | |
| 1989 | Little Vera | Маленькая Вера | Malenkaya Vera | Vasili Pichul | |
| 1989 | Commissar | Комиссар | Komissar | Aleksandr Askoldov | |

=== 1990s ===
| Year | International title | Original title | Transliterated title (per BGN/PCGN standard) | Director(s) | Ref(s) |
|---|---|---|---|---|---|
| 1990 | **Ashik Kerib** | აშიკ-ქერიბი | Strange Ashik | Dodo Abashidze, Sergei Parajanov | |
| 1990 | Solovky Power | Власть Соловецкая | Vlast Solovetskaya | Marina Goldovskaya | |
| 1990 | The Servant | Слуга | Sluga | Vadim Abdrashitov | |
| 1991 | **The Asthenic Syndrome** | Астенический синдром | Astenicheskiy sindrom | Kira Muratova | |
| 1991 | Freeze Die Come to Life | Замри, умри, воскресни! | Zamri, umri, voskresni! | Vitali Kanevsky | |
| 1991 | Taxi Blues | Такси-блюз | Taksi-Blyuz | Pavel Lungin | |
| 1992 | **Promised Heaven** | Небеса обетованные | Nebesa obetovannye | Eldar Ryazanov | |
| 1992 | Passport | Паспорт | Pasport | Georgiy Daneliya | |
| 1992 | Spotted Dog Running at the Edge of the Sea | Пегий пёс, бегущий краем моря | Pegiy pyos, Begushchiy kraem morya | Karen Gevorkian | |
| 1993 | **Encore, Once More Encore!** | Анкор, ещё анкор! | Ankor, escho ankor! | Pyotr Todorovsky | |
| 1993 | La Chasse aux papillons | Охота на бабочек | Okhota na babochek | Otar Iosseliani | |
| 1993 | Close to Eden | Урга — территория любви | Urga – territoriya lyobvi | Nikita Mikhalkov | |
| 1994 | **Makarov** | Макаров | Makarov | Vladimir Khotinenko | |
| 1994 | Children of Iron Gods | Дети чугунных богов | Deti chugunnykh bogov | Tamás Tóth | |
| 1994 | Window to Paris | Окно в Париж | Okno v Parizh | Yuri Mamin | |
| 1995 | **Passions** | Увлеченья | Uvlechenya | Kira Muratova | |
| 1995 | Assia and the Hen with the Golden Eggs | Курочка Ряба | Kurochka Ryaba | Andrei Konchalovsky | |
| 1995 | Katya Ismailova | Подмосковные вечера | Podmoskovnye vechera | Valery Todorovsky | |
| 1996 | **Peculiarities of the National Hunt** | Особенности национальной охоты | Osobennosti natsionalnoy okhoty | Aleksandr Rogozhkin | |
| 1996 | The Aristocratic Peasant Girl | Барышня-крестьянка | Baryshnya-krestyanka | Aleksey Sakharov | |
| 1996 | A Moslem | Мусульманин | Musulmanin | Vladimir Khotinenko | |
| 1997 | **Prisoner of the Mountains** | Кавказский пленник | Kavkazskiy plennik | Sergei Bodrov | |
| 1997 | Summer People | Летние люди | Letnie lyudi | Sergei Ursuliak | |
| 1997 | Jermak | Ермак | Ermak | Valery Uskov, Vladimir Krasnopolsky | |
| 1997 | To Love Russian Way 2 | Любить по-русски 2 | Lyubit po-russki 2 | Yevgeny Matveyev | |
| 1998 | **The Thief** | Вор | Vor | Pavel Chukhray | |
| 1998 | The Brother | Брат | Brat | Aleksei Balabanov | |
| 1998 | Time of a Dancer | Время танцора | Vremya tantsora | Vadim Abdrashitov | |
| 1999 | **Of Freaks and Men** | Про уродов и людей | Pro urodov i lyudey | Aleksei Balabanov | |
| 1999 | Day of the Full Moon | День полнолуния | Den polnoluniya | Karen Shakhnazarov | |
| 1999 | Country of the Deaf | Страна глухих | Strana glukhikh | Valery Todorovsky | |
| 1999 | A Totalitarian Romance | Тоталитарный роман | Totalitarnyy roman | Viacheslav Sorokin | |

=== 2000s ===
| Year | International title | Original title | Transliterated title (per BGN/PCGN standard) | Director(s) | Producer(s) | Ref(s) |
|---|---|---|---|---|---|---|
| 2000 | **Khrustalyov, My Car!** | Хрусталёв, машину! | Khrustalyov, mashinu! | Aleksei German | Armen Medvedev, Aleksandr Golutva, Guy Séligmann | |
| 2000 | The Barracks | Барак | Barak | Valeriy Ogorodnikov | Leonid Yarmolnik, Stanislav Arkhipov, Valeriy Ogorodnikov, Rolf Jaster | |
| 2000 | Voroshilov Sharpshooter | Ворошиловский стрелок | Voroshilovskiy strelok | Stanislav Govorukhin | Igor Tolstunov, Sergei Kozlov | |
| 2001 | **His Wife's Diary** | Дневник его жены | Dnevnik ego zheny | Alexei Uchitel | Aleksandr Golutva, Alexei Uchitel | |
| 2001 | Luna Papa | Лунный папа | Lunnyy papa | Bakhtyar Khudojnazarov | Igor Tolstunov | |
| 2001 | Tender Age | Нежный возраст | Nezhniy vozrast | Sergei Solovyov | Nikita Mikhalkov, Leonid Vereshchagin | |
| 2002 | **Taurus** | Телец | Telets | Alexander Sokurov | Viktor Sergeev | |
| 2002 | In August 1944 | В августе 44-го... | V avguste 44-go... | Mikhail Ptashuk | Olga Semago, Vladimir Semago | |
| 2002 | Let's Make Love | Займёмся любовью | Zaymyomsya lyubovyu | Denis Evstigneev | Aleksandr Atanesyan, Igor Tolstunov | |
| 2003 | **The Cuckoo** | Кукушка | Kukushka | Aleksandr Rogozhkin | Sergei Selyanov | |
| 2003 | War | Война | Voina | Aleksei Balabanov | Sergei Selyanov | |
| 2003 | The Star | Звезда | Zvezda | Nikolai Lebedev | Karen Shakhnazarov, Aleksandr Litvinov | |
| 2003 | The Lover | Любовник | Lyubovnik | Valery Todorovsky | Aleksandr Akopov | |
| 2003 | Chekhov's Motifs | Чеховские мотивы | Chekhovskie motivy | Kira Muratova | Igor Kalyonov | |
| 2004 | **The Return** | Возвращение | Vozvrashcheniye | Andrey Zvyagintsev | Dmitry Lesnevsky | |
| 2004 | Bless the Woman | Благословите женщину | Blagoslovite zhenshchinu | Stanislav Govorukhin | Yekaterina Maskina | |
| 2004 | Roads to Koktebel | Коктебель | Koktebel | Boris Khlebnikov, Alexei Popogrebski | Roman Borisevich | |
| 2004 | Magnetic Storms | Магнитные бури | Magnitnye buri | Vadim Abdrashitov | Aleksandr Potyomkin | |
| 2004 | Russian Ark | Русский ковчег | Russkij Kovcheg | Alexander Sokurov | Jens Meurer, Karsten Stöter, Andrey Deryabin, Andrey Razumovsky | |
| 2004 | Old Women | Старухи | Starukhi | Gennady Sidorov | Gennady Sidorov | |
| 2005 | **Our Own** | Свои | Svoi | Dmitry Meskhiev | Viktor Glukhov, Sergey Melkumov, Yelena Yatsura | |
| 2005 | A Driver for Vera | Водитель для Веры | Voditel dlya Very | Pavel Chukhray | Igor Tolstunov, Alexander Rodnyansky, Mikhail Zilberman | |
| 2005 | Long Farewell | Долгое прощание | Dolgoe proshchanie | Sergei Ursuliak | Yevgeny Ulyushkin | |
| 2005 | My Step Brother Frankenstein | Мой сводный брат Франкенштейн | Moy svodnyy brat Frankenshteyn | Valery Todorovsky | Leonid Yarmolnik | |
| 2005 | The Tuner | Настройщик | Nastroyshchik | Kira Muratova | Sergey Chliyants | |
| 2006 | **The 9th Company** | 9 рота | 9 rota | Fyodor Bondarchuk | Yelena Yatsura, Sergey Melkumov, Alexander Rodnyansky | |
| 2006 | Garpastum | Гарпастум | Garpastum | Aleksei German Jr. | Aleksandr Vaynshteyn | |
| 2006 | The Italian | Итальянец | Italyanets | Andrei Kravchuk | Andrei Zertsalov | |
| 2006 | Dreaming of Space | Космос как предчувствие | Kosmos kak predchuvstvie | Alexei Uchitel | Alexei Uchitel | |
| 2006 | The Sun | Солнце | Solntse | Alexander Sokurov | Igor Kalenov, Andrei Sigle, Marco Mueller | |
| 2007 | **The Island** | Остров | Ostrov | Pavel Lungin | Sergei Shumakov, Pavel Lungin, Olga Vasilieva | |
| 2007 | Andersen. Life Without Love | Андерсен. Жизнь без любви | Andersen. Zhizn bez lyubvi | Eldar Ryazanov | Eldar Ryazanov | |
| 2007 | Alive | Живой | Zhivoy | Aleksandr Veledinsky | Sergei Chliyants | |
| 2007 | Playing the Victim | Изображая жертву | Izobrazhaya zhertvu | Kirill Serebrennikov | Natalia Mokritskaya, Uliana Savelieva | |
| 2007 | Free Floating | Свободное плавание | Svobodnoe plavanie | Boris Khlebnikov | Roman Borisevich | |
| 2008 | **Mongol** | Монгол | Mongol | Sergei Bodrov | Sergei Selyanov, Sergei Bodrov, Anton Melnik | |
| 2008 | Cargo 200 | Груз 200 | Gruz 200 | Aleksei Balabanov | Sergei Selyanov | |
| 2008 | Simple Things | Простые вещи | Prosty'e veshchi | Alexei Popogrebski | Roman Borisevich | |
| 2008 | Travelling with Pets | Путешествие с домашними животными | Puteshestviye s domashnimi zhivotnymi | Vera Storozheva | Sabina Eremeeva, Igor Tolstunov | |
| 2008 | Mermaid | Русалка | Rusalka | Anna Melikian | Ruben Dishdishyan | |
| 2009 | **Hipsters** | Стиляги | Stilyagi | Valery Todorovsky | Leonid Lebedev, Leonid Yarmolnik, Vadim Goryainov, Valery Todorovsky | |
| 2009 | Paper Soldier | Бумажный солдат | Bumazhnyy soldat | Aleksei German Jr. | Artem Vasilyev, Sergey Shumakov | |
| 2009 | Wild Field | Дикое поле | Dikoe pole | Mikheil Kalatozishvili | Andrey Bondarenko, Mikheil Kalatozishvili, Sergey Snezhkin | |
| 2009 | Vanished Empire | Исчезнувшая империя | Ischeznuvshaya imperiya | Karen Shakhnazarov | Karen Shakhnazarov | |
| 2009 | Captive | Пленный | Plennyy | Alexei Uchitel | Alexei Uchitel | |

=== 2010s ===
| Year | International title | Original title | Transliterated title (per BGN/PCGN standard) | Director(s) | Producer(s) | Ref(s) |
|---|---|---|---|---|---|---|
| 2010 | **Room and a Half** | Полторы комнаты, или сентиментальное путешествие на родину | Poltory komnaty, ili sentimentalnoe puteshestvie na rodinu | Andrei Khrzhanovsky | Andrei Khrzhanovsky, Artyom Vasilyev | |
| 2010 | Wolfy | Волчок | Volchok | Vasily Sigarev | Roman Borisevich, Ruben Dishdishyan | |
| 2010 | Ward No. 6 | Палата No. 6 | Palata No. 6 | Karen Shakhnazarov | Karen Shakhnazarov | |
| 2010 | Pete on the Way to Heaven | Петя по дороге в Царствие Небесное | Petia po doroge v tsarstvie nebesnoye | Nikolai Dostal | Fyodor Popov | |
| 2010 | Tsar | Царь | Tsar | Pavel Lungin | Pavel Lungin | |
| 2011 | **The Edge** | Край | Kray | Alexei Uchitel | Konstantin Ernst, Alexei Uchitel, Aleksandr Maksimov | |
| 2011 | Fortress of War | Брестская крепость | Brestskaia krepost | Alexander Kott | Igor Ugolnikov, Ruben Dishdishyan, Vladimir Zametalin | |
| 2011 | How I Ended This Summer | Как я провёл этим летом | Kak ya provyol etim letom | Alexei Popogrebski | Roman Borisevich, Aleksandr Kushaev | |
| 2011 | A Stoker | Кочегар | Kochegar | Aleksei Balabanov | Sergei Selyanov | |
| 2011 | Silent Souls | Овсянки | Ovsyanki | Aleksey Fedorchenko | Igor Mishin, Maria Nazari, Dmitry Vorobev | |
| 2012 | **Once Upon a Time There Lived a Simple Woman** | Жила-была одна баба | Zhila-byla odna baba | Andrei Smirnov | Elena Smirnova, Andrei Smirnov | |
| 2012 | Vysotsky. Thank You For Being Alive | Высоцкий. Спасибо, что живой | Vysotskiy. Spasibo, chto zhivoy | Pyotr Buslov | Anatoly Maksimov, Konstantin Ernst, Nikolay Popov, Nikita Vysotsky, Michael Schlicht, Paul Heth | |
| 2012 | Elena | Елена | Elena | Andrey Zvyagintsev | Alexander Rodnyansky, Sergey Melkumov | |
| 2012 | Siberia, Monamour | Сибирь. Монамур | Sibir. Monamur | Slava Ross | Pavel Skurikhin, Vadim Zhuk, Igor Chekalin, Slava Ross | |
| 2012 | Chapiteau-show | Шапито-шоу | Shapito-shou | Sergey Loban | Ekaterina Gerasicheva | |
| 2013 | **Faust** | Фауст | Faust | Alexander Sokurov | Andrey Sigle | |
| 2013 | White Tiger | Белый тигр | Belyy tigr | Karen Shakhnazarov | Karen Shakhnazarov | |
| 2013 | The Conductor | Дирижёр | Dirizhyor | Pavel Lungin | Pavel Lungin, Yevgeny Panfilov | |
| 2013 | Kokoko | Кококо | Kokoko | Avdotya Smirnova | Sergei Selyanov | |
| 2013 | The Horde | Орда | Orda | Andrei Proshkin | Sergey Kravets, Natalya Gostyushina | |
| 2014 | **The Geographer Drank His Globe Away** | Географ глобус пропил | Geograf Globus Propil | Alexander Veledinsky | Vadim Goryainov, Leonid Lebedev, Valery Todorovsky | |
| 2014 | Kiss Them All! | Горько! | Gorko! | Zhora Kryzhovnikov | Ilya Burets, Dmitry Nelidov, Sergei Svetlakov, Timur Bekmambetov | |
| 2014 | A Long and Happy Life | Долгая счастливая жизнь | Dolgaya chastlivaya zhizn | Boris Khlebnikov | Roman Borisevich, Aleksandr Kushaev | |
| 2014 | Metro | Метро | Metro | Anton Megerdichev | Igor Tolstunov, Sergey Kozlov | |
| 2014 | Stalingrad | Сталинград | Stalingrad | Fyodor Bondarchuk | Anton Zlatopolsky, Sergey Melkumov, Alexander Rodnyansky, Dmitry Rudovsky | |
| 2015 | **Hard to Be a God** | Трудно быть богом | Trudno byt' bogom | Aleksei German | Rushan Nasibulin, Viktor Izvekov | |
| 2015 | The Postman's White Nights | Белые ночи почтальона Алексея Тряпицына | Belye nochi pochtalona Alekseya Tryapitsyna | Andrei Konchalovsky | Andrei Konchalovsky | |
| 2015 | The Fool | Дурак | Durak | Yuri Bykov | Alexei Uchitel, Kira Saksaganskaya | |
| 2015 | Test | Испытание | Ispytanie | Alexander Kott | Igor Tolstunov | |
| 2015 | Leviathan | Левиафан | Leviafan | Andrey Zvyagintsev | Alexander Rodnyansky, Sergey Melkumov | |
| 2016 | **My Good Hans** | Милый Ханс, дорогой Пётр | Milyy Khans, dorogoy Pyotr | Aleksandr Mindadze | Aleksandr Mindadze, Liza Antonova, Len Blavatnik, Valery Kharkov, Heino Deckert, Andrey Annensky | |
| 2016 | Battalion | Батальонъ | Batal'on | Dmitry Meskhiev | Igor Ugolnikov, Fyodor Bondarchuk, Dmitry Rudovsky | |
| 2016 | Battle for Sevastopol | Битва за Севастополь | Bitva za Sevastopol | Sergey Mokritskiy | Egor Olesov, Natalia Mokritskaya | |
| 2016 | The End of Beautiful Era | Конец прекрасной эпохи | Konets prekrasnoy epokhi | Stanislav Govorukhin | Stanislav Govorukhin, Ekaterina Maskina | |
| 2016 | About Love | Про любовь | Pro lyubov | Anna Melikian | Anna Melikian | |
| 2016 | The Land of Oz | Страна ОЗ | Strana OZ | Vasily Sigarev | Sofiko Kiknavelidze, Dmitry Ulyukaev | |
| 2017 | **Paradise** | Рай | Ray | Andrei Konchalovsky | Andrei Konchalovsky | |
| 2017 | The Queen of Spades | Дама пик | Dama pik | Pavel Lungin | Pavel Lungin, Fyodor Bondarchuk, Dmitry Rudovsky, Yevgeny Panfilov | |
| 2017 | The Duelist | Дуэлянт | Duelyant | Aleksey Mizgirev | Alexander Rodnyansky, Sergey Melkumov | |
| 2017 | The Collector | Коллектор | Kollektor | Alexey Krasovsky | Dmitry Ruzhentsev, Georgiy Shabanov, Eduard Eloyan | |
| 2017 | The Monk and the Demon | Монах и бес | Monakh i bes | Nikolay Dostal | Igor Tolstunov | |
| 2017 | The Student | Ученик | Uchenik | Kirill Serebrennikov | Ilya Stewart, Diana Safarova, Yuri Kozyrev | |
| 2018 | **Arrhythmia** | Аритмия | Aritmiya | Boris Khlebnikov | Ruben Dishdishyan, Sergei Selyanov | |
| 2018 | How Vitka Chesnok Drove Lyokha Shtyr to the House for Disabled | Как Витька Чеснок вёз Лёху Штыря в дом инвалидов | Kak Vitka Chesnok vyoz Lyokhu Shtyrya v dom invalidov | Aleksandr Khant | Fyodor Popov, Vladimir Malyshev | |
| 2018 | Loveless | Нелюбовь | Nelyubov | Andrey Zvyagintsev | Alexander Rodnyansky, Sergey Melkumov, Gleb Fetisov | |
| 2018 | Salyut 7 | Салют-7 | Salyut-7 | Klim Shipenko | Anton Zlatopolsky, Sergei Selyanov, Bakur Bakuradze | |
| 2018 | Closeness | Теснота | Tesnota | Kantemir Balagov | Nikolay Yankin | |
| 2018 | Baltic Tango | Холодное танго | Kholodnoe tango | Pavel Chukhray | Sabina Eremeeva, Alexey Reznikovich | |
| 2019 | **Anna's War** | Война Анны | Voyna Anny | Aleksey Fedorchenko | Andrei Savelyev, Artyom Vasilyev, Maksim Lozhevsky | |
| 2019 | Dovlatov | Довлатов | Dovlatov | Aleksei German Jr. | Andrey Savelev, Artyom Vasilev, Konstantin Ernst | |
| 2019 | Story of One Appointment | История одного назначения | Istoriya odnogo naznacheniya | Avdotya Smirnova | Natalya Smirnova, Oksana Barkovskaya, Anatoly Chubais, Sergei Selyanov, Viktoria Shamlikashvili | |
| 2019 | Leto | Лето | Leto | Kirill Serebrennikov | Ilya Stewart, Murad Osmann, Pavel Burya | |
| 2019 | The Man Who Surprised Everyone | Человек, который удивил всех | Chelovek, kotoryj udivil vsekh | Natalya Merkulova, Aleksey Chupov | Ekaterina Filippova | |

=== 2020s ===
| Year | International title | Original title | Transliterated title (per BGN/PCGN standard) | Director(s) | Producer(s) | Ref(s) |
|---|---|---|---|---|---|---|
| 2020 | **A Frenchman** | Француз | Frantsuz | Andrei Smirnov | Elena Smirnova, Andrei Smirnov | |
| 2020 | Ayka | Айка | Ayka | Sergey Dvortsevoy | Sergey Dvortsevoy | |
| 2020 | Sin | Грех | Grekh | Andrei Konchalovsky | Alisher Usmanov | |
| 2020 | Beanpole | Дылда | Dylda | Kantemir Balagov | Alexander Rodnyansky, Sergey Melkumov | |
| 2020 | Odessa | Одесса | Odessa | Valery Todorovsky | Leonid Yarmolnik, Valery Todorovsky | |
| 2021 | **Dear Comrades!** | Дорогие товарищи! | Dorogie tomarishchi! | Andrei Konchalovsky | Alisher Usmanov | |
| 2021 | A Siege Diary | Блокадный дневник | Blokadnyy dnevnik | Andrey Zaytsev | Andrey Zaytsev | |
| 2021 | Doctor Lisa | Доктор Лиза | Doktor Liza | Oksana Karas | Rafael Minasbekyan, Dzhanik Fayziev, Aleksandr Bondarev, Timur Weinstein, Aleksey Zemskiy | |
| 2021 | The Whaler Boy | Китобой | Kitoboy | Philipp Yuryev | Alexei Uchitel | |
| 2021 | Scarecrow | Пугало | Pugalo | Dmitry Davydov | Dmitry Davydov | |
| 2022 | Ivan Denisovich | Иван Денисович | Ivan Denisovich | Gleb Panfilov | Anton Zlatopolsky, Maksim Panfilov, Irina Savina | |
| 2022 | Captain Volkonogov Escaped | Капитан Волконогов бежал | Kapitan Volkonogov bezhal | Natalya Merkulova, Aleksey Chupov | Valery Fedorovich, Yevgeny Nikishov, Aleksandr Plotnikov, Catherine Kissa, Charles-Evrard Chekhov, Nadezhda Zayonchkovskaya | |
| 2022 | Compartment No. 6 | Купе номер 6 | Kupe nomer 6 | Juho Kuosmanen | Jussi Rantamäki, Riina Sildos, Natalya Drozd, Sergei Selyanov, Jamila Wenske | |
| 2022 | Medea | Медея | Medeya | Alexander Zeldovich | Alexander Zeldovich, Tatyana Ostern, Anna Katchko, Elnara Guseynova, Len Blavatnik, Danny Cohen | |
| 2022 | Unclenching the Fists | Разжимая кулаки | Razzhimaya kulaki | Kira Kovalenko | Alexander Rodnyansky, Sergey Melkumov, Natalya Gorina | |
| 2022 | Persian Lessons | Уроки фарси | Uroki farsi | Vadim Perelman | Rauf Atamalibekov, Ilya Tsofin, Vadim Perelman, Ilya Stewart, Pavel Burya, Murad Osmann | |
| 2024 | **The Righteous** | Праведник | Pravednik | Sergei Ursuliak | Anton Zlatopolsky, Timur Weinstein, Leonid Vereschagin, Nikita Mikhalkov, Mariya Ushakova, Vadim Vereshchagin, Yuliya Sumachyova | |
| 2024 | 1993 | 1993 | 1993 | Alexander Veledinsky | Zhanna Tedeeva-Kalinina, Aleksandra Voronkova, Dmitry Litvinov | |
| 2024 | The Challenge | Вызов | Vyzov | Alexander Veledinsky | Konstantin Ernst, Dmitry Rogozin, Sergey Titinkov, Eduard Iloyan, Denis Zhalinsky, Vitaly Shlyappo, Alexey Trotsyuk, Mikhail Tkachenko, Olga Danova, Natalia Smirnova, Svetlana Izvekova, Nonna Aristarkhova | |
| 2024 | Here's to You and Us! | За нас с вами! | Za nas s vami! | Andrei Smirnov | Andrei Smirnov | |
| 2024 | Three Minutes of Silence | Снегирь | Snegir | Boris Khlebnikov | Sergey Selyanov, Natalya Drozd, Natalya Smirnova, Tatyana Bonakova | |
| 2024 | Anna's feelings | Чувства Анны | Chuvstva Anny | Anna Melikyan | Anna Melikyan, Ekaterina Ryzhaya, Dmitriy Litvinov, Ekaterina Kononenko | |
