= Russian Guild of Film Critics Award for Best Film =

Russian film award

The Russian Guild of Film Critics Award for Best Film is an annual award given by the Russian Guild of Film Critics to honor the best Russian film made that year.

== Winners ==
indicates the winners.

=== 1990s ===
| Year | Winner | Director(s) |
|---|---|---|
| 1998 | Country of the Deaf | Valery Todorovsky |
| 1998 | The Outskirts | Pyotr Lutsik |
| 1998 | Marigolds in Flower | Sergey Snezhkin |
| 1999 | Khrustalyov, My Car! | Aleksei German |
| 1999 | The Barracks | Valeriy Ogorodnikov |
| 1999 | Checkpoint | Aleksandr Rogozhkin |
| 1999 | Moloch | Alexander Sokurov |

=== 2000s ===
| Year | Winner | Director(s) |
|---|---|---|
| 2000 | Luna Papa | Bakhtyar Khudojnazarov |
| 2000 | His Wife's Diary | Alexei Uchitel |
| 2000 | The Romanovs: An Imperial Family | Gleb Panfilov |
| 2001 | Taurus | Alexander Sokurov |
| 2001 | Tender Age | Sergei Solovyov |
| 2001 | Minor People | Kira Muratova |
| 2001 | The Romanovs | Gleb Panfilov |
| 2002 | The Cuckoo | Aleksandr Rogozhkin |
| 2002 | War | Aleksei Balabanov |
| 2002 | Chekhov's Motifs | Kira Muratova |
| 2003 | The Return | Andrey Zvyagintsev |
| 2003 | Bimmer | Peter Buslov |
| 2003 | Magnetic Storms | Vadim Abdrashitov |
| 2003 | Old Women | Gennady Sidorov |
| 2004 | Our Own | Dmitry Meskhiev |
| 2004 | My Step Brother Frankenstein | Valery Todorovsky |
| 2004 | The Tuner | Kira Muratova |
| 2005 | The Sun | Alexander Sokurov |
| 2005 | Garpastum | Aleksei German Jr. |
| 2005 | The Italian | Andrei Kravchuk |
| 2006 | Free Floating | Boris Khlebnikov |
| 2006 | Alive | Aleksandr Veledinsky |
| 2006 | Playing the Victim | Kirill Serebrennikov |
| 2006 | The Island | Pavel Lungin |
| 2007 | Cargo 200 | Aleksei Balabanov |
| 2007 | Alexandra | Alexander Sokurov |
| 2007 | Simple Things | Alexei Popogrebski |
| 2008 | Wild Field | Mikheil Kalatozishvili |
| 2008 | Paper Soldier | Aleksei German Jr. |
| 2008 | Tulpan | Sergey Dvortsevoy |
| 2008 | Yuri's Day | Kirill Serebrennikov |
| 2009 | Wolfy | Vasily Sigarev |
| 2009 | Room and a Half | Andrei Khrzhanovsky |
| 2009 | Help Gone Mad | Boris Khlebnikov |

=== 2010s ===
| Year | Winner | Director(s) |
|---|---|---|
| 2010 | A Stoker | Aleksei Balabanov |
| 2010 | Silent Souls | Aleksey Fedorchenko |
| 2010 | How I Ended This Summer | Alexei Popogrebski |
| 2011 | Elena | Andrey Zvyagintsev |
| 2011 | Innocent Saturday | Aleksandr Mindadze |
| 2011 | Once Upon a Time There Lived a Simple Woman | Andrei Smirnov |
| 2011 | Chapiteau-show | Sergey Loban |
| 2012 | Faust | Alexander Sokurov |
| 2012 | Living | Vasily Sigarev |
| 2012 | The Horde | Andrei Proshkin |
| 2012 | Short Stories | Mikhail Segal |
| 2012 | Me Too | Aleksei Balabanov |
| 2013 | The Geographer Drank His Globe Away | Alexander Veledinsky |
| 2013 | Eternal Homecoming | Kira Muratova |
| 2013 | Celestial Wives of the Meadow Mari | Aleksey Fedorchenko |
| 2014 | Leviathan | Andrey Zvyagintsev |
| 2014 | The Postman's White Nights | Andrei Konchalovsky |
| 2014 | The Fool | Yuri Bykov |
| 2015 | My Good Hans | Aleksandr Mindadze |
| 2015 | The Land of Oz | Vasily Sigarev |
| 2015 | Angels of Revolution | Aleksey Fedorchenko |
| 2016 | Paradise | Andrei Konchalovsky |
| 2016 | Zoology | Ivan I. Tverdovsky |
| 2016 | The Student | Kirill Serebrennikov |
| 2016 | Francofonia | Alexander Sokurov |
| 2017 | Arrhythmia | Boris Khlebnikov |
| 2017 | The Bottomless Bag | Rustam Khamdamov |
| 2017 | Loveless | Andrey Zvyagintsev |
| 2018 | Anna's War | Aleksey Fedorchenko |
| 2018 | Leto | Kirill Serebrennikov |
| 2018 | Heart of the World | Nataliya Meshchaninova |
| 2019 | Beanpole | Kantemir Balagov |
| 2019 | Ayka | Sergey Dvortsevoy |
| 2019 | Kerosin | Yusup Razykov |

=== 2020s ===
| Year | Winner | Director(s) |
|---|---|---|
| 2020 | Dear Comrades! | Andrei Konchalovsky |
| 2020 | Scarecrow | Dmitry Davydov |
| 2020 | Conference | Ivan I. Tverdovsky |
| 2020 | Deeper! | Mikhail Segal |
| 2021 | Captain Volkonogov Escaped | Natalya Merkulova and Aleksey Chupov |
| 2021 | Medea | Alexander Zeldovich |
| 2021 | Nuuccha | Vladimir Minkuev |
| 2021 | Unclenching the Fists | Kira Kovalenko |
| 2024 | Fairytale | Alexander Sokurov |
| 2024 | My Little Nighttime Secret | Nataliya Meshchaninova |
| 2024 | Patient No. 1 | Rezo Gigineishvili |
| 2024 | Snegir | Boris Khlebnikov |
| 2024 | Frau | Lyubov Mulmenko |
| 2024 | Plague | Dmitry Davydov |
| 2024 | Anna's Feelings | Anna Melikian |
| 2024 | Here's to You and Us! | Andrei Smirnov |
| 2025 | The Master and Margarita | Mikhail Lockshin |
| 2025 | Air | Aleksei German Jr. |
| 2025 | This Summer Will End | Maksim Arbugaev and Vladimir Munkuev |
| 2025 | Dad Croaked on Saturday | Zaka Abdrakhmanova |
| 2025 | Eternal Winter | Nikolay Larionov |
| 2025 | Snowflakes in My Yard | Bakur Bakuradze |
