= Golden Eagle Award for Best Motion Picture =

Annual Russian film award

- Awarded for: Best Motion Picture of the Year
- Country: Russia
- Presented by: National Academy of Motion Pictures Arts and Sciences of Russia
- First award: 2002
- Currently held by: Air (Воздух, 2024)
- Website: Official site of the National Academy of Motion Picture Arts and Sciences of Russia

The Golden Eagle Award for Best Motion Picture (Russian: Золотой Орёл за лучший игровой фильм) is one of twenty four award categories presented annually by the National Academy of Motion Pictures Arts and Sciences of Russia. It is one of the Golden Eagle Awards, which were conceived by Nikita Mikhalkov as a counterweight to the Nika Award established in 1987 by the Russian Academy of Cinema Arts and Sciences.

Each year the members of the academy choose five nominees. The first film to be awarded was The Cuckoo, a comedy film about the Winter War between Finland and the Soviet Union during World War II. The most recent award was given to Air, in 2024.

== Nominees and winners ==
Key

Sign	Meaning
**Bold**	Indicates the winner

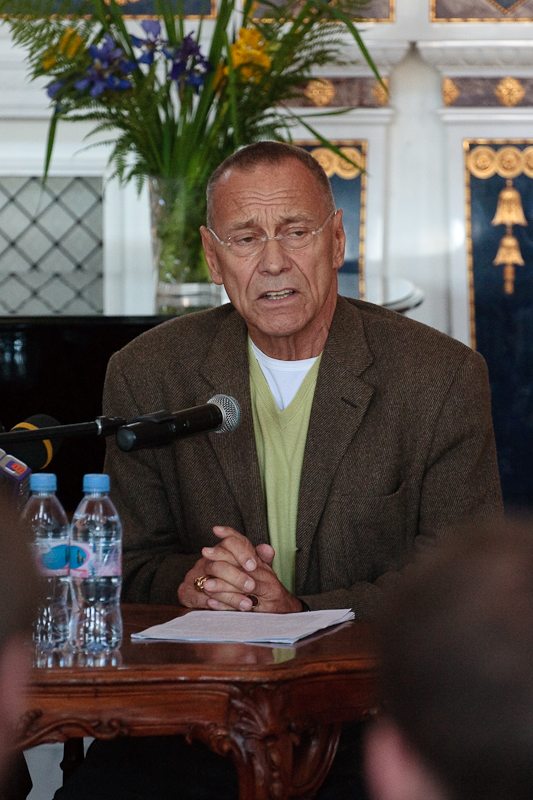
Andrei Konchalovsky was together with Igor Maslennikov, the first to be nominated for a film as a director and as a producer, in 2002

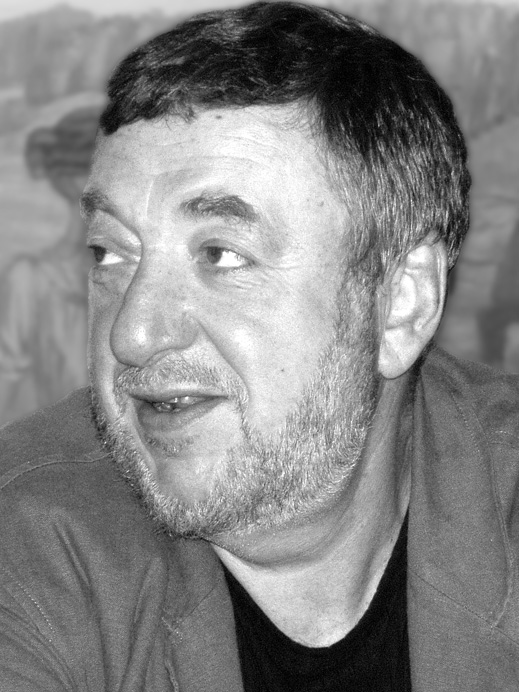
Pavel Lungin was the first winner as a director and as a producer, in 2006

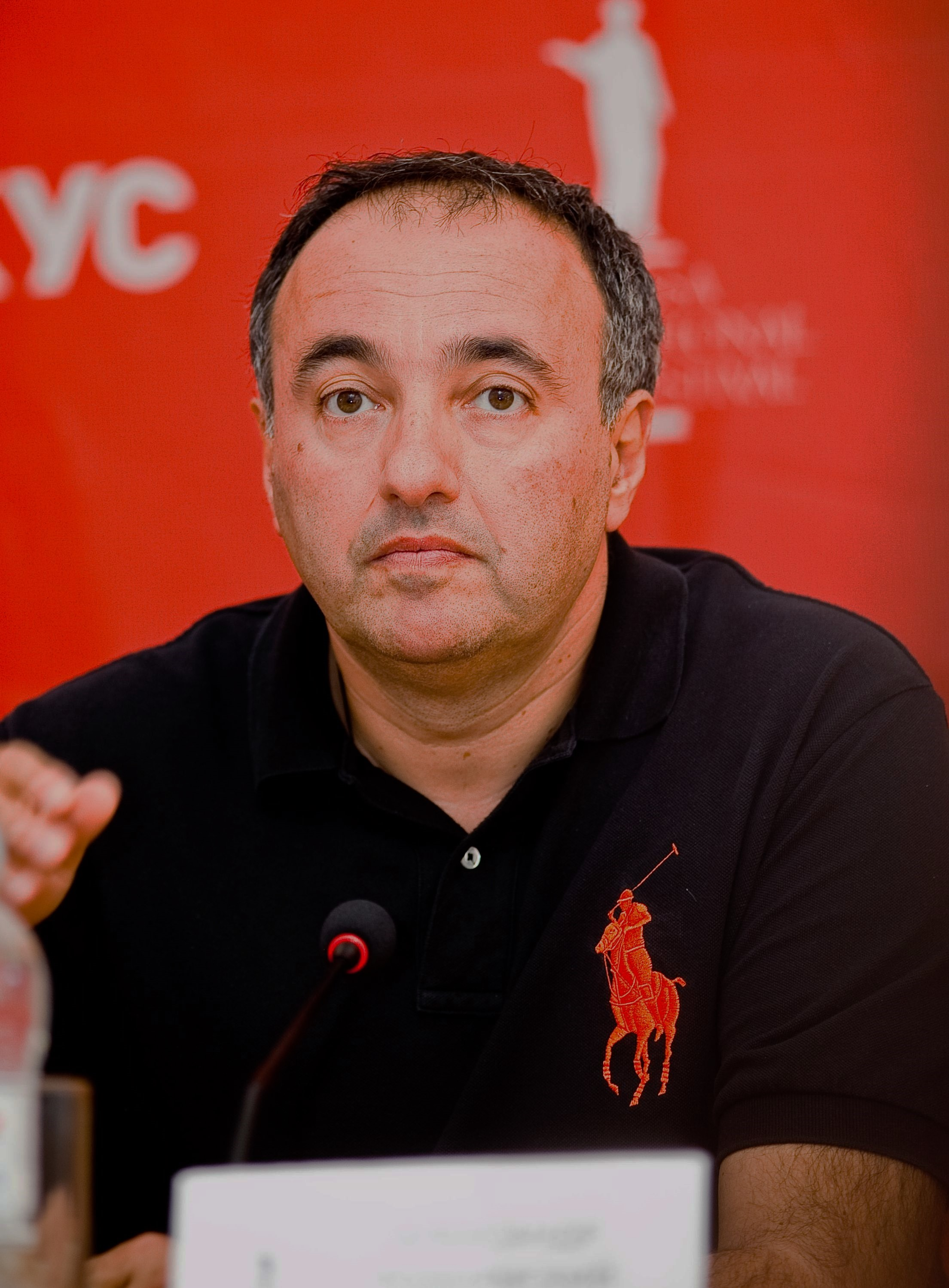
Alexander Rodnyansky holds the record for the most nominations, with nine, all of which as a producer. He won the prize twice, in 2005 and 2011

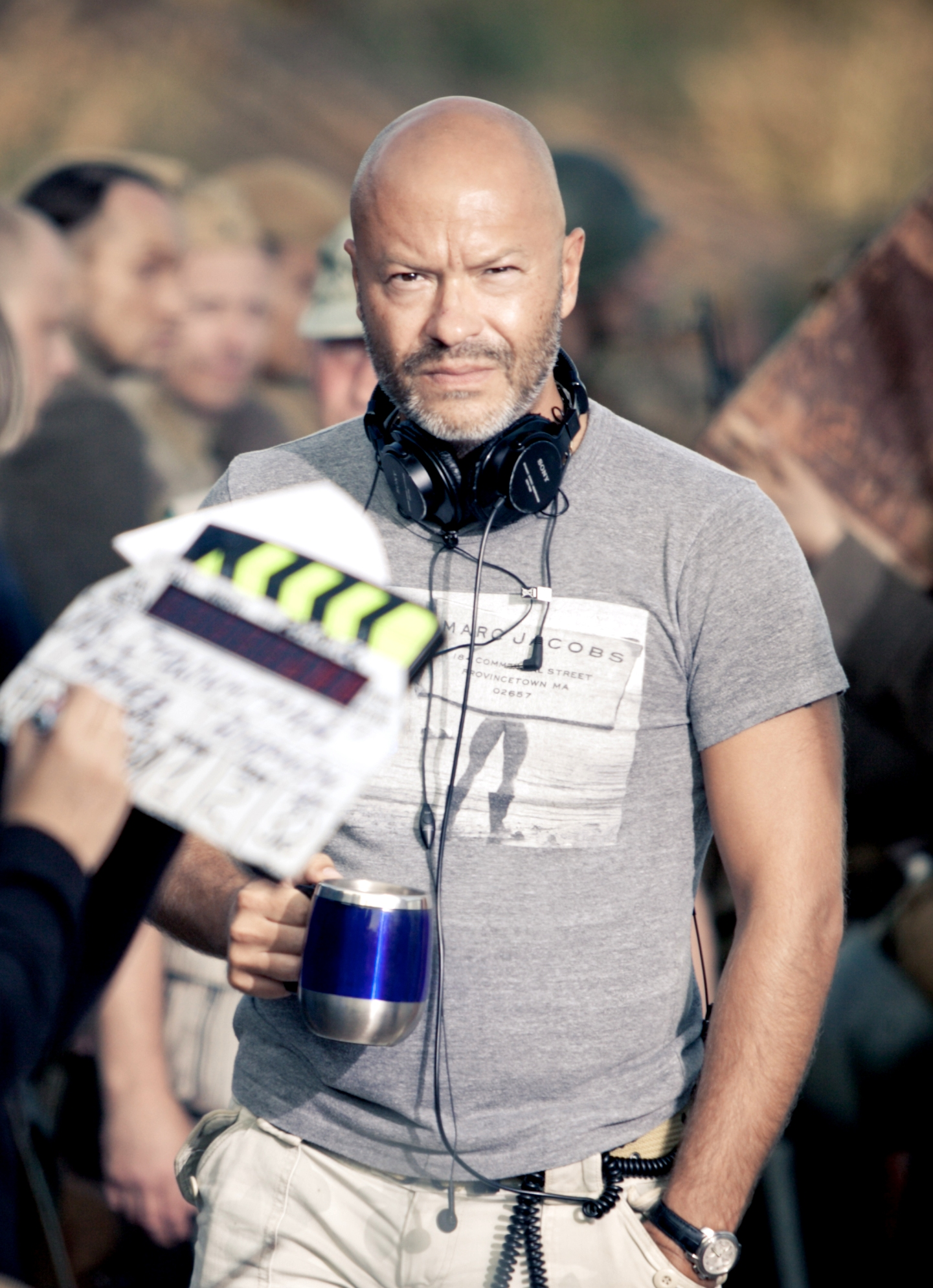
Seven of Bondarchuk's works were nominated for the Eagle Award.

=== 2000s ===
Year	International title	Original title	Transliterated title (per BGN/PCGN standard)	Director(s)	Producer(s)	Ref(s)
2002	**The Cuckoo**	Кукушка	Kukushka	Aleksandr Rogozhkin	Sergey Selyanov	
2002	War	Война	Voyna	Aleksei Balabanov	Sergey Selyanov	
2002	House of Fools	Дом дураков	Dom durakov	Andrei Konchalovsky	Felix Kleyman, Andrei Konchalovsky	
2002	The Star	Звезда	Zvezda	Nikolai Lebedev	Karen Shakhnazarov, Alexandr Litvinov	
2002	Letters to Else	Письма к Эльзе	Pis'ma k El'ze	Igor Maslennikov	Igor Maslennikov, Andrey Razumovskiy	
2003	**The Return**	Возвращение	Vozvrashchenie	Andrey Zvyagintsev	Dmitry Lesnevsky	
2003	Poor, Poor Pavel	Бедный бедный Павел	Bednyy, bednyy Pavel	Vitaly Melnikov	Andrey Zertsalov	
2003	Roads to Koktebel	Коктебель	Koktebel	Boris Khlebnikov, Alexei Popogrebski	Roman Borisevich	
2003	Magnetic Storms	Магнитные бури	Magnitny·e buri	Vadim Abdrashitov	Alexandr Potemkin	
2003	The Stroll	Прогулка	Progulka	Alexei Uchitel	Alexei Uchitel	
2004	**72 Meters**	72 метра	72 metra	Vladimir Khotinenko	Anatolij Maximov, Konstantin Ernst, Leonid Bereshagin	
2004	A Driver for Vera	Водитель для Веры	Voditel' dlya Very	Pavel Chukhrai	Igor Tolstunov, Alexander Rodnyansky	
2004	My Step Brother Frankenstein	Мой сводный брат Франкенштейн	Moy Cvodnyy Brat Frankenshteyn	Valeri Todorovsky	Leonid Yarmolnik	
2004	Daddy	Папа	Papa	Vladimir Mashkov	Igor Tolstunov, Vladimir Mashkov	
2004	Our Own	Свои	Svoi	Dmitry Meskhiev	Viktor Glukov, Sergey Melkumov, Elena Yacura	
2005	**The 9th Company**	9 рота	9 rota	Fedor Bondarchuk	Elena Yakura, Sergey Melkumov, Alexander Rodnyansky	
2005	The Italian	Итальянец	Ital'yanets	Andrei Kravchuk	Andrey Zertsalov	
2005	Dreaming of Space	Космос как предчувствие	Kosmos kak predchuvstvie	Alexei Uchitel	Alexei Uchitel	
2005	The State Counsellor	Статский советник	Statskiy sovetnik	Filipp Yankovsky	Nikita Mikhalkov, Leonid Bereshagin	
2005	The Turkish Gambit	Турецкий гамбит	Tureckiy gambit	Dzhanik Fayziev	Anatoly Maximov, Konstantin Ernst, Leonid Bereshagin	
2006	**The Island**	Остров	Ostrov	Pavel Lungin	Pavel Lungin, Sergey Shumakov	
2006	Day Watch	Дневной дозор	Dnevnoy dozor	Timur Bekmambetov	Anatoly Maximov, Konstantin Ernst	
2006	Alive	Живой	Zhivoy	Alexandr Veledinsky	Sergey Chliyants	
2006	Playing the Victim	Изображая жертву	Izobrazhaya zhertvu	Kirill Serebrennikov	Natalia Mokritskaya, Ulyana Saveleva, Leonid Sagalsky	
2006	It Doesn't Hurt Me	Мне не больно	Mne ne bol'no	Aleksei Balabanov	Sergey Selyanov	
2007	**12**	12	12	Nikita Mikhalkov	Nikita Mikhalkov, Leonid Bereshagin	
2007	Artistka	Артистка	Artistka	Stanislav Govorukhin	Ekaterina Maskina	
2007	Mongol	Mongol	Mongol	Sergey Bodrov	Sergey Selyanov, Sergey Bodrov, Anton Melnik	
2007	Simple Things	Простые вещи	Prosty'e veshhi	Alexei Popogrebski	Roman Borisevich	
2007	Travelling with Pets	Путешествие с домашними животными	Puteshestvie s domashnimi zhivotn·ymi	Vera Storoshcheva	Sabina Eremeeva, Igor Tolstunov	
2008	**Wild Field**	Дикое поле	Dikoe pole	Mikheil Kalatozishvili	Sergey Sneshchkin, Andrey Bondarenko, Mikheil Kalatozishvili	
2008	Admiral	Адмиралъ	Admiral”	Andrei Kravchuk	Dzhanik Fayziev, Anatoly Maximov	
2008	Paper Soldier	Бумажный солдат	Bumazhnyy soldat	Aleksei German Jr.	Aretem Vasiliev, Sergey Shumakov	
2008	Everybody Dies but Me	Все умрут, а я oстанусь	Vse umrut, a ya ostanus	Valeriya Gai Germanika	Igor Tolstunov	
2008	Vanished Empire	Исчезнувшая империя	Ischeznuvshaya imperiya	Karen Shakhnazarov	Karen Shakhnazarov	
2009	**Stilyagi**	Стиляги	Stilyagi	Valery Todorovsky	Leonid Lebedev, Leonid Yarmolnik, Vadim Goryanov, Valery Todorovsky	
2009	Anna Karenina	Анна Каренина	Anna Karenina	Sergei Solovyov	Sergei Solovyov, Oleg Urushev	
2009	Ward Number 6	Палата №6	Palata No. 6	Karen Shakhnazarov	Karen Shakhnazarov	
2009	Pete on the Way to Heaven	Петя по дороге в царствие небесное	Petya po doroge v tsarstvie nebesnoe	Nikolay Dostal	Fedor Popov	
2009	Tsar	Царь	Tsar	Pavel Lungin	Pavel Lungin	

=== 2010s ===
Year	International title	Original title	Transliterated title (per BGN/PCGN standard)	Director(s)	Producer(s)	Ref(s)
2010	**How I Ended This Summer**	Как я провёл этим летом	Kak ya provyol etim letom	Alexei Popogrebski	Roman Barisevich, Aleksandr Kushaev	
2010	Fortress of War	Брестская Крепость	Brestskaya Krepost	Alexander Kott	Igor Ugolnikov, Ruben Dishdishyan, Vladimir Zametalin	
2010	Kandagar	Кандагар	Kandagar	Andrey Kavun	Valery Todorovsky, Ilya Neretin	
2010	The Edge	Край	Kray	Alexei Uchitel	Konstantin Ernst	
2010	Silent Souls	Овсянки	Ovsyanki	Alexey Fedorchenko	Igor Mishin, Maria Nasari	
2011	**Elena**	Елена	Yelyena	Andrey Zvyagintsev	Alexander Rodnyansky	
2011	Sundays	В субботу	V subbotu	Aleksandr Mindadze	Dmitry Efremov, Oleg Kokhan, Alexander Rodnyansky, Mathias Esche	
2011	Two Days	Два дня	Dva dnya	Avdotiya Smirnova	Fyodor Bondarchuk, Dmitry Rudovsky, Ruben Dishdishyan	
2011	The House	Дом	Dom	Oleg Pogodin	Sergey Selyanov, Denis Frolov, Sergey Daniyelyan	
2011	Shapito Show	Шапито-шоу	Shapito-shou	Sergey Loban	Ekaterina Gerasicheva, Aleksey Ageyev, Mikhail Sinyov	
2012	**White Tiger**	Белый тигр	Belyy tigr	Karen Shakhnazarov	Karen Shakhnazarov, Galina Shadur	
2012	Vysotsky. Thank You For Being Alive	Высоцкий. Спасибо, что живой	Vysotskiy. Spasibo, chto zhivoy	Pyotr Buslov	Konstantin Ernst, Anatoly Maksimov, Michael Schlicht, Nikita Vysotsky	
2012	Soulless	Духless	Dukhless	Roman Prygunov	Petr Anurov, Dmitriy Rudovskiy, Fyodor Bondarchuk	
2012	The Horde	Орда	Orda	Andrei Proshkin	Natalya Gostyushina, Sergey Kravets	
2012	Spy	Шпион	Shpion	Alexey Andrianov	Leonid Vereshchagin, Sergey Shumakov	
2013	**Legend № 17**	Легенда № 17	Legenda № 17	Nikolai Lebedev	Leonid Vereshchagin, Anton Zlatopolsky, Nikita Mikhalkov	
2013	The Geographer Drank His Globe Away	Географ глобус пропил	Geograf globus propil	Alexander Veledinsky	Vadim Goryanov, Leonid Lebedev, Valery Todorovsky	
2013	Kiss Them All!	Горько!	Gor'ko!	Zhora Kryzhovnikov	Ilya Burets, Dmitry Nelidov, Sergey Svetlakov, Timur Bekmambetov	
2013	Ku! Kin-dza-dza	Ку! Кин-дза-дза	Ku! Kin-dza-dza	Georgy Danelia, Tatiana Ilyina	Yuri Kushnerev, Sergey Selyanov, Oleg Urushev, Leonid Yarmolnik, Konstantin Ernst	
2013	Stalingrad	Сталинград	Stalingrad	Fyodor Bondarchuk	Alexander Rodnyansky, Anton Zlatopolsky, Dmitry Rudovsky, Sergey Melkumov	
2014	**Sunstroke**	Солнечный удар	Solnechny udar	Nikita Mikhalkov	Leonid Vereshchagin, Anton Zlatopolsky, Nikita Mikhalkov	
2014	The Postman's White Nights	Белые ночи почтальона Алексея Тряпицына	Belye nochi pochtalyona Alekseya Tryapitsyna	Andrei Konchalovsky	Andrei Konchalovsky	
2014	Star	Звезда	Zvezda	Anna Melikian	Anna Melikian, Ruben Dishidishyan	
2014	Leviathan	Левиафан	Leviafan	Andrey Zvyagintsev	Alexander Rodnyansky, Sergey Melkumov	
2014	Weekend	Weekend	—	Stanislav Govorukhin	Stanislav Govorukhin, Ekaterina Maskina	
2015	**About Love**	Про любовь	Pro Lyubov'	Anna Melikian	Anna Melikian	
2015	Battalion	Батальонъ	Batal'on"	Dmitry Meskhiev	Igor Ugolnikov, Fyodor Bondarchuk, Dmitry Rudovsky	
2015	Battle for Sevastopol	Битва за Севастополь	Bitva za Sevastopol'	Sergey Mokritskiy	Natalya Mokritskaya, Egor Olesov	
2015	The End of a Great Era	Конец прекрасной эпохи	Konets Prekrasnoy Epokhi	Stanislav Govorukhin	Stanislav Govorukhin, Yekaterina Maskina	
2015	My Good Hans	Милый Ханс, дорогой Пётр	Milyy Khans, Dorogoy Potr	Aleksandr Mindadze	Aleksandr Mindadze, Liza Antonova, Len Blavatnik, Heino Deckert, Valery Kharkov	
2016	**Paradise**	Рай	Ray	Andrei Konchalovsky	Andrei Konchalovsky, Florian Deyle	
2016	The Duelist	Дуэлянт	Dujeljant	Alexey Mizgirev	Alexander Rodnyansky, Sergey Melkumov	
2016	The Icebreaker	Ледокол	Ledokol	Nikolay Khomeriki	Igor Tolstunov, Sergey Kozlov	
2016	Collector	Коллектор	Kollektor	Aleksey Krasovskiy	Dmitry Ruzhentsev, Georgiy Shabanov, Eduard Iloyan	
2016	Flight Crew	Экипаж	Ekipazh	Nikolai Lebedev	Leonid Vereshchagin, Anton Zlatopolskiy, Nikita Mikhalkov	
2017	**Salyut 7**	Салют 7	Salyut 7	Klim Shipenko	Anton Zlatopolskiy, Sergey Selyanov, Bakur Bakuradze	
2017	Arrhythmia	Аритмия	Aritmiya	Boris Khlebnikov	Ruben Dishdishyan, Sergey Selyanov	
2017	Bolshoi	Большой	Bol'shoy	Valery Todorovsky	Valery Todorovsky, Anton Zlatopolskiy	
2017	The Age of Pioneers	Время первых	Vremya Pervykh	Dmitry Kiselyov	Timur Bekmambetov, Yevgeny Mironov, Sergey Ageev	
2017	Loveless	Нелюбовь	Nelyubov'	Andrey Zvyagintsev	Alexander Rodnyansky, Sergey Melkumov, Gleb Fetisov	
2018	**Anna's War**	Война Анны	Voyna Anny	Aleksei Fedorchenko	Andrey Savelev, Artyom Vasilev, Maxim Lojevsky	
2018	Going Vertical	Движение вверх	Dvizheniye Vverkh	Anton Megerdichev	Leonid Vereshchagin, Anton Zlatopolskiy, Nikita Mikhalkov	
2018	Story of One Appointment	История одного назначения	Istoriya Odnogo Naznacheniya	Avdotya Smirnova	Natalya Smirnova, Oxana Barkovskaya, Anatoly Chubais, Sergey Selyanov, Viktoria Shamlikashvili	
2018	Ice	Лёд	Lod	Oleg Trofim	Mikhail Vrubel, Aleksandr Andryushchenko, Fyodor Bondarchuk, Dmitry Rudovsky, Vyacheslav Murugov	
2018	Spitak	Спитак	Spitak	Alexander Kott	Theresa Varzhapetyan, Elena Glikman	
2019	**Text**	Текст	Tekst	Klim Shipenko	Eduard Iloyan, Aleksey Trotsyuk, Denis Zhalinsky, Vitaly Shlyappo, Rafael Minasbekyan, Vadim Vereshchagin	
2019	The Bull	Бык	Byk	Boris Akopov	Fyodor Popov, Vladimir Malyshev	
2019	Beanpole	Дылда	Dylda	Kantemir Balagov	Alexander Rodnyansky, Sergey Melkumov	
2019	Odessa	Одесса	Odessa	Valery Todorovsky	Leonid Yarmolnik, Valery Todorovsky	
2019	T-34	T-34	—	Aleksey Sidorov	Anton Zlatopolskiy, Ruben Dishdishyan, Len Blavatnik with the participation of Leonid Vereshchagin, Nikita Mikhalkov	

=== 2020s ===
Year	International title	Original title	Transliterated title (per BGN/PCGN standard)	Director(s)	Producer(s)	Ref(s)
2020	**A Siege Diary**	Блокадный дневник	Blokadnyy Dnevnik	Andrei Zaitsev	Andrei Zaitsev	
2020	Dear Comrades!	Дорогие товарищи!	Dorogiye Tovarishchi!	Andrei Konchalovsky	Alisher Usmanov, Andrei Konchalovsky	
2020	Ice 2	Лёд 2	Lod 2	Zhora Kryzhovnikov	Mikhail Vrubel, Aleksandr Andryushchenko, Fyodor Bondarchuk, Anton Zlatopolskiy, Vyacheslav Murugov	
2020	Union of Salvation	Союз спасения	Soyuz Spaseniya	Andrei Kravchuk	Anatoly Maksimov, Konstantin Ernst	
2020	Streltsov	Стрельцов	Strel'tsov	Ilya Uchitel	Alexei Uchitel, Rafael Minasbekyan, Vadim Vereshchagin, Anton Zlatopolskiy, Leonid Vereshchagin, Nikita Mikhalkov	
2021	**The Silver Skates**	Сере́бряные коньки́	Serebryanye konki	Michael Lockshin	Petr Anurov, Leonid Vereshchagin, Anton Zlatopolskiy, Rafael Minasbekyan, Nikita Mikhalkov, Grigoriy Stoyalov	
2021	Ivan Denisovich	Иван Денисович	Ivan Denisovich	Gleb Panfilov	Anton Zlatopolsky, Maksim Panfilov, Irina Savina	
2021	Captain Volkonogov Escaped	Капитан Волконогов бежал	Kapitan Volkonogov bezhal	Natalya Merkulova, Aleksey Chupov	Valery Fedorovich, Yevgeny Nikishov, Aleksandr Plotnikov, Catherine Kissa, Charles-Evrard Chekhov, Nadezhda Zayonchkovskaya	
2021	No Escapes	Огонь	Ogon	Aleksey Nuzhnyy	Leonid Vereshchagin, Anton Zlatopolskiy, Rafael Minasbekyan, Nikita Mikhalkov, Aleksey Nuzhnyy, Sergey Kornikhin	
2021	Persian Lessons	Уроки фарси	Uroki farsi	Vadim Perelman	Rauf Atamalibekov, Ilya Tsofin, Vadim Perelman, Ilya Stewart, Pavel Burya, Murad Osmann	
2022	**Champion of the World**	Чемпион мира	Chempion mira	Aleksey Sidorov	Leonid Vereshchagin, Anton Zlatopolskiy, Nikita Mikhalkov, Rafael Minasbekyan, Aleksey Sidorov, Sergey Gurevich, Mikhail Kitaev	
2022	Intensive Care	Здоровый человек	Zdorovyy chelovek	Pyotr Todorovsky Jr.	Valery Fedorovich, Yevgeny Nikishov, Ivan Golomovzyuk, Anna Gudkova, Yelena Torchinskaya	
2022	Palmira	Однажды в Пустыне	Odnazhdy v Pustyne	Andrei Kravchuk	Alexei Uchitel	
2022	First Oscar	Первый Оскар	Pervyy Oskar	Sergey Mokritskiy	Natalia Mokritskaya, Vadim Vereshchagin	
2022	Land of Legends	Сердце Пармы	Serdtse Parmy	Anton Megerdichev	Darya Lavrova, Vlad Riashyn, Igor Tolstunov, Anton Zlatopolsky, Filipp Brusnikin	
2023	**Three Minutes of Silence**	Снегирь	Snegir	Boris Khlebnikov	Sergey Selyanov, Natalya Drozd, Natalya Smirnova, Tatyana Bonakova	
2023	1993	1993	1993	Alexander Veledinsky	Zhanna Tedeeva-Kalinina, Aleksandra Voronkova, Dmitry Litvinov	
2023	The Challenge	Вызов	Vyzov	Klim Shipenko	Konstantin Ernst, Dmitry Rogozin, Sergey Titinkov, Eduard Iloyan, Denis Zhalinsky, Vitaly Shlyappo, Alexey Trotsyuk, Mikhail Tkachenko, Olga Danova, Natalia Smirnova, Svetlana Izvekova, Nonna Aristarkhova	
2023	Wish of the Fairy Fish	По щучьему велению	Po shchuch'yemu veleniyu	Alexandr Voitinsky	Sergey Selyanov, Natalya Smirnova, Alexandr Gorokhov	
2023	The Righteous	Праведник	Pravednik	Sergei Ursuliak	Anton Zlatopolsky, Timur Weinstein, Leonid Vereschagin, Nikita Mikhalkov, Mariya Ushakova, Vadim Vereshchagin, Yuliya Sumachyova	
2024	**Air**	Воздух	Air	Aleksei German Jr.	Artem Vasiliev, Konstantin Ernst	
2024	Endless Winter	Вечная Зима	Vechnaya Zima	Nikolay Larionov	Maksim Korolev, Ol’ga Zhuravlëva, Ruben Dishdishyan	
2024	Love of the Soviet Union	Любовь Советского Союза	Lyubov’ Sovetskogo Soyuza	Nikita Vysotskiy, Il’ya Lebedev, Dmitriy Iosifov	Maksim Korolëv, Ol’ga Zhuravlëva, Ruben Dishdishyan, Vladimir Proskuryakov	
2024	Look at me!	Смотри на меня!	Smotri na menya!	Vladimir Grammatikov	Marina Zhigalova, Vadim Vereshchagin	
2024	Guest from the Future	Сто лет тому вперёд	Sto let tomu vperyod	Alexander Andryushchenko	Mikhail Vrubel, Alexander Andryushchenko, Fyodor Bondarchuk, Denis Baglai, Vadim Vereschagin, Anton Zlatopolsky, Vyacheslav Murugov, Yuliana Slashcheva	
