= Russian Guild of Film Critics =

Organisation in Russia

- Abbreviation: RGOFC
- Type: Film criticism
- Location: Moscow, Russia
- Official language: Russian
- Website: Official site of the Russian Guild of Film Critics

The Russian Guild of Film Critics (Russian: Гильдия киноведов и кинокритиков России) is a Russian organization of professional film critics, headquartered in Moscow. Beginning in 1998, the guild began conferring annual awards in several categories. The awards were called the "Golden Ram" or "Golden Aries" from 1998 to 2004, then, beginning in 2005, the name was changed to "White Elephant".

The guild belongs to the Union of Cinematographers of the Russian Federation, a non-government organisation, and has been a member of FIPRESCI since 1999.

== Award categories ==
=== Current categories ===
- Best Film
- Best Director
- Best Actor
- Best Actress
- Best Supporting Actor
- Best Supporting Actress
- Best Screenplay
- Best Cinematography
- Best Art Direction
- Best Music
- Best Animated Film
- Best Documentary
- Best Short Film
- Best First Film
- Best Television Series
- Lifetime Achievement Award
- Event of the Year

=== Retired awards ===
- Best Foreign Language Film (awarded 1998–2011)
- Best Foreign Actor (awarded 1998–2003)
- Best Foreign Actress (awarded 1998–2003)

== Award ceremonies ==
Ceremony	Year	Best Film Winner
1st	1998	Country of the Deaf
2nd	1999	Khrustalyov, My Car!
3rd	2000	Luna Papa
4th	2001	Taurus
5th	2002	The Cuckoo
6th	2003	The Return
7th	2004	Our Own
8th	2005	The Sun
9th	2006	Free Floating
10th	2007	Cargo 200
11th	2008	Wild Field
12th	2009	Wolfy
13th	2010	A Stoker
14th	2011	Elena
15th	2012	Faust
16th	2013	The Geographer Drank His Globe Away
17th	2014	Leviathan
18th	2015	My Good Hans
19th	2016	Paradise
20th	2017	Arrhythmia
21st	2018	Anna's War
22nd	2019	Beanpole
23rd	2020	Dear Comrades!
24th	2021	Captain Volkonogov Escaped
