= 2014 Russian Guild of Film Critics Awards =

17th Russian Guild of Film Critics

17th White Elephant Awards
- Date: February 04, 2014

Highlights
- Best Film: Leviathan
- Most awards: Leviathan (6)
- Most nominations: Leviathan (8)

The 17th White Elephant Awards, given by the Russian Guild of Film Critics (RGOFC), honored the best in Russian film for 2014.

== Winners and nominees ==
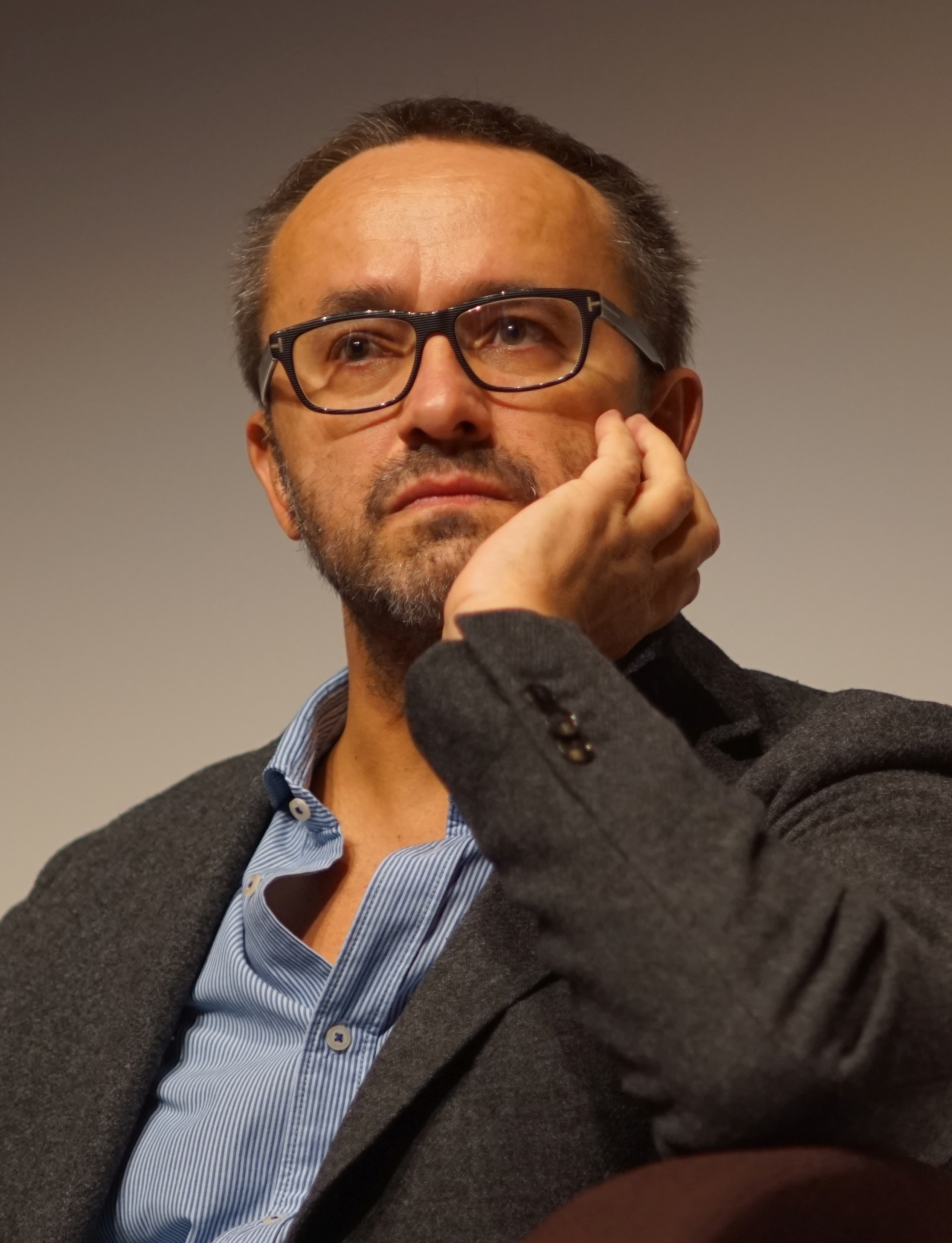
Andrey Zvyagintsev, Best Director and Best Screenplaywinner

Best Film	Best Director
Leviathan; The Postman's White Nights; The Fool	Andrey Zvyagintsev – Leviathan; Andrei Konchalovsky – The Postman's White Nights; Alexander Kott – Test
Best Actor	Best Actress
Aleksei Serebryakov – Leviathan; Artyom Bystrov – The Fooll; Aleksandr Zbruyev – The Film About Alekseyev	Elena Lyadova – Leviathan; Agniya Kuznetsova – Yes and Yes; Severija Janušauskaitė – Star
Best Supporting Actor	Best Supporting Actress
Roman Madyanov – Leviathan; Stepan Devonin – The Hope Factory; Yuri Tsurilo – Hard to Be a God	Natalya Surkova – The Fool; Olga Lapshina – Corrections Class; Anna Ukolova – Leviathan
Best Screenplay	Best Cinematography
Oleg Negin, Andrey Zvyagintsev – Leviathan; Nataliya Meshchaninova, Lyubov Mulmenko – Star; Nataliya Meshchaninova, Lyubov Mulmenko, Ivan Ugarov – The Hope Factory	Vladimir Ilyin, Yuri Klimenko – Hard to Be a God; Levan Kapanadze – Test; Mikhail Krichman – Leviathan
Best Production Design	Best Music
Sergei Kokovkin, Georgy Kropachev, Elena Zhukova – Hard to Be a God; Ulyana Ryabova – Star; Olga Yurasova – The Hope Factory	Alexei Aigui – Test; Viktor Lebedev – Hard to Be a God; Igor Vdovin – Star
