= Crush (2009 Russian film) =

Russian romantic drama film anthology

- Russian: Короткое замыкание
- Directed by: Pyotr Buslov; Aleksey German Jr.; Boris Khlebnikov; Kirill Serebrennikov; Ivan Vyrypaev
- Written by: Boris Khlebnikov; Maksim Kurochkin; Ivan Ugarov; Ivan Vyrypaev
- Produced by: Konstantin Buslov; Sabina Eremeeva; Yuriy Miroshnichenko
- Starring: Irina Butanaeva; Yuriy Chursin; Ivan Dobronravov; Aleksey Filimonov; Andrey Fomin
- Cinematography: Shandor Berkeshi; Fedor Lyass
- Edited by: Pavel Khanyutin; Ivan Lebedev
- Release date: 2009
- Country: Russia
- Language: Russian

Crush (Russian: Короткое замыкание) is a 2009 Russian romance film directed by Pyotr Buslov, Aleksey German Jr., Kirill Serebrennikov, Ivan Vyrypaev and Boris Khlebnikov.

== Plot ==
The film tells five different love stories.

== Cast ==
- Irina Butanaeva as Olya (segment "Pozor")
- Yuriy Chursin
- Ivan Dobronravov
- Aleksey Filimonov
- Andrey Fomin
- Karolina Gruszka as Her
- Aleksandr Ilin as Sailor
- Vitaliy Khaev
- Yekaterina Kuzminskaya
- Yuliya Peresild
