= Ukolova =

Ukolova is a surname. Notable people with the surname include:

- Anna Ukolova (born 1978), Russian actress
- Elizaveta Ukolova (born 1998), Czech figure skater
- Evgenia Ukolova (born 1989), Russian beach volleyball player
