= Aleksei German =

Aleksei German may refer to:

- Aleksei Yuryevich German (1938–2013), Russian film director and screenwriter
- Aleksei Alekseivich German (born 1976), Russian film director and screenwriter, son of Aleksei Yuryevich German
