= Aleksandr Yatsenko =

Russian actor (born 1977)

- Александр Яценко
- Born: Aleksandr Viktorovich Yatsenko; 22 May 1977 (age 49); Volgograd, RSFSR, USSR
- Citizenship: Soviet Union; Russia
- Occupation: Actor
- Years active: 2003–present
- Spouse: Marina Rozhkova
- Children: 1
- Awards: Nika Award (2016, 2018)

Aleksandr Viktorovich Yatsenko (Russian: Алекса́ндр Ви́кторович Яце́нко; born 22 May 1977) is a Russian actor. He appeared in more than thirty films since 2003.

== Selected filmography ==
Year	Title	Role	Notes
2003	The Suit	Shytr	
2006	It Doesn't Hurt Me	Misha	
2006	Free Floating	Lyonya	
2009	Help Gone Mad	Koltsov	
2010	Orange Juice	Egor	
2012	The Horde	keleynik Fedka	
2013	The Thaw	Egor Myachin	
2014	Ekaterina	Pyotr III Fyodorovich	
2016	The Icebreaker	Tsimbalistyi	
2016	The Duelist	Yakovlev Jr.	
2017	Arrhythmia	Oleg	
2017	Chernobyl: Zone of Exclusion	Vitaly Sorokin	
2017	The Road to Calvary	Alexey Krasilnikov	
2020	To the Lake	Pavel	
2020	Streltsov	Yuri Postnikov	
2021	Captain Volkonogov Escaped	Major Gvozdyov	
2021	No Looking Back	Oleg	
2023	Pravednik	Kiselyov	
2023	Fisher	Valery Kozyrev	
2024	The Master and Margarita	Aloisy Mogarych	
2026	Buratino	Papa Carlo	
2026	Rise of the Empire	Nikita Demidov	
