= The Icebreaker (film) =

- Official Poster
- Directed by: Nikolay Khomeriki
- Written by: Aleksey Onishchenko
- Produced by: Alexander Kozlov; Sergey Kozlov; Vasily Soloviev (ru); Igor Tolstunov (ru)
- Starring: Pyotr Fyodorov; Sergei Puskepalis; Aleksandr Pal; Vitaliy Khaev; Alexey Barabash; Olga Smirnova; Anna Mikhalkova; Aleksandr Yatsenko; Dmitriy Podnozov
- Cinematography: Fedor Lyass
- Music by: Tuomas Kantelinen
- Production company: PROFIT
- Release date: October 20, 2016 (Russia)
- Running time: 120 minutes
- Country: Russia
- Language: Russian
- Budget: $10,000,000

The Icebreaker (Russian: Ледокол, romanized: Ledokol) is a 2016 Russian disaster film directed by Nikolay Khomeriki. The plot of the film is based in part on the real events that occurred in 1985 with the icebreaker Mikhail Somov, which was trapped by Antarctic ice and spent 133 days in forced drift. The film premiered in Russia on October 20, 2016.

== Plot ==
In the Spring of 1985. The icebreaker "Mikhail Somov" is off the coast of Antarctica. While navigating, the ship heads towards an iceberg and Captain Petrov starts to take measures to avoid it. The captain's efforts are hindered when a passenger and dog fall overboard. Because of the rescue operation, the ship fails to avoid the iceberg and sustains damage.

The First Officer, who has shown antipathy towards the Captain due to his perception that the Captain runs a lax ship radios the undefined “Ministry” in Leningrad, to which the Ministry issues orders removing the captain.

A new captain Valentin Sevchenko, a man of uncompromising and domineering power, is sent to the ship by helicopter. He immediately enters into a confrontation with Andrei Petrov, accusing the latter of disorder and as a consequence of the misfortune that has occurred. Under the control of Sevchenko, the icebreaker rises in the ice. His actions to the extreme heat up the already heavy atmosphere on the ship: the sailors are starting to give up nerves, which provokes conflict within the team. In anticipation of rescue, the crew of the ship spends 133 days among the ice.

== Cast ==
- Pyotr Fyodorov as Andrei Petrov
- Sergei Puskepalis as Valentin Sevchenko
- Aleksandr Pal as Nikolai Kukushkin, helicopter pilot
- Vitaliy Khaev as Bannik, second mate of the captain
- Alexey Barabash as Anatoliy Eremeev
- Olga Smirnova as Lyuda, wife of captain Andrei
- Anna Mikhalkova as Galina, wife of captain Valentin
- Dmitriy Mulyar as Vladimir Safonov, a KGB officer
- Aleksandr Yatsenko as Tsimbalistyi
- Dmitriy Podnozov as Dolgov, ship's doctor
- Boris Kamorzin as Belyaev, member of the expedition
- Vyacheslav Pasyukov as sailor
- Aleksandr Oblasov as Leva, a passenger fell overboard
- Margarita Bychkova as Nina
- Aleksey Ilyin as polar explorer
- Aleksandr Plaksin as polar explorer
- Stanislav Ryadinskiy as Boris Zorkin, radio operator
- Igor Khripunov as Tikhonov
- Anatoly Khropov as Chernogortsev
- Aleksandr Pokatnev as sailor
- Gleb Glebov as sailor
- Aleksey Shupletsov as sailor
- Artyom Krysin as sailor
- Sergey Gorbunov as sailor
- Vladimir Pachin as sailor
- Aleksey Ruchkov as sailor

== Production ==
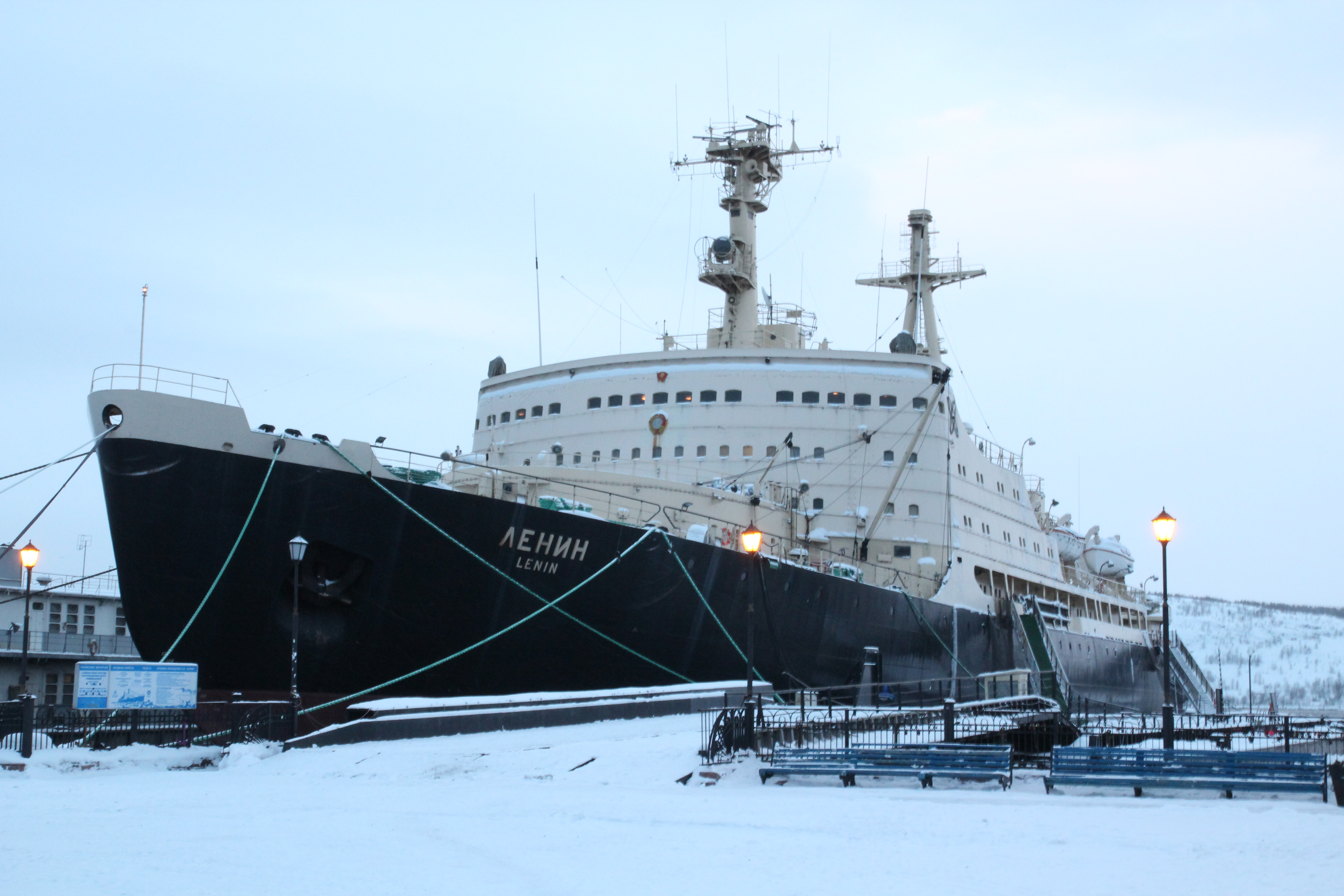
Nuclear icebreaker "Lenin" 2013

Filming took place in severe weather conditions in Murmansk, Saint Petersburg, Sevastopol and in the mountains of the Kola Peninsula - Khibiny for 3.5 months. The 1957 nuclear icebreaker Lenin was used, which has now been taken out of service 1989 and parked permanently in Murmansk.

=== Box office ===
During the opening weekend, the film led the Russian rental market, bypassing the American action movie Jack Reacher: Never Go Back with Tom Cruise in the title role and collecting 127.3 million rubles (129). However, even so, the film at the box office collected less than 3/5 of the amount spent on it.
