= Help Gone Mad =

2009 Russian comedy film

- Russian: Сумасшедшая помощь
- Directed by: Boris Khlebnikov
- Written by: Boris Khlebnikov; Aleksandr Rodionov
- Produced by: Roman Borisevich; Ruben Dishdishyan
- Starring: Evgeniy Sytyy; Sergey Dreyden; Anna Mikhalkova; Igor Chernevich; Nikita Emshanov
- Cinematography: Shandor Berkeshi
- Edited by: Ivan Lebedev
- Release date: 2009
- Country: Russia
- Language: Russian

Help Gone Mad (Russian: Сумасшедшая помощь) is a 2009 Russian tragicomedy film directed by Boris Khlebnikov.

== Plot ==
The film tells about a kind and lazy man from Belarus who goes to Moscow to earn money. As a result of a criminal incident, he was left without money and documents. He was lucky, a good man appeared nearby and gave him the opportunity to live with him, as a result of which various funny adventures take place with them.

== Cast ==
- Yevgeny Sytyy as Yevgeny
- Sergey Dreyden as the Engineer
- Anna Mikhalkova as the Daughter
- Igor Chernevich as Godeyev
- Aleksandr Yatsenko as Koltsov
- Nikita Emshanov as Semkov
- Sergey Burunov as the Burglar
- Alexander Gordon
- Kirill Käro
