= It Doesn't Hurt Me =

- Мне не больно (Mne ne bolno)
- Directed by: Aleksey Balabanov
- Written by: Valeri Mnatsakanov
- Produced by: Sergey Selyanov; Maxim Ukhanov
- Starring: Renata Litvinova; Aleksandr Yatsenko; Dmitri Dyuzhev
- Cinematography: Sergey Astakhov
- Edited by: Tatyana Kuzmichyova
- Music by: Vadim Samoylov
- Production company: CTB
- Release date: June 15, 2006 (Russia)
- Running time: 100 minutes
- Country: Russia
- Language: Russian

It Doesn't Hurt Me (Russian: Мне не больно, romanized: Mne ne bolno) is a 2006 Russian film directed by Aleksey Balabanov. The film was released on June 15, 2006 in Russia and stars Renata Litvinova, Aleksandr Yatsenko, and Dmitri Dyuzhev as three young adults living in St.Petersburg.

== Synopsis ==
Tata (Renata Litvinova) is a vivacious young woman whose health is deteriorating due to leukemia. When she meets Misha (Aleksandr Yatsenko) and Oleg (Dmitri Dyuzhev), the three hit it off well and Tata begins to date Misha. The problem is that she keeps her diagnosis from Misha, which complicates the relationship.

== Cast ==
- Renata Litvinova as Tata
- Aleksandr Yatsenko as Misha
- Dmitri Dyuzhev as Oleg
- Nikita Mikhalkov as Sergei Sergeyevich
- Inga Strelkova-Oboldina as Alya (as Inga Oboldina-Strelkova)
- Valentin Kuznetsov as Vasya
- Sergey Makovetskiy as Doctor
- Mark Rudinstein as Zilberman
- Marina Solopchenko as Zilberman's wife
- Mariya Nikiforova as Doctor's wife
- Ilya Mozgovoy as Security guard Sasha
- Sami Hurskulahti as Otto
- Veronika Dmitriyeva as Girl in train
- Dariya Utkina as Tanya (as Dasha Utkina)
- Marina Shpakovskaya as Prostitute

== Reception ==
Time Out Russia gave the movie a positive review and called it a "strong melodrama". Seans, a Saint Petersburg-published magazine specializing on cinema published a number of short review of the most influential authors. The reviews were generally positive, and, in particular, they emphasized a good performance of Litvinova.

=== Awards ===
- Best Actress at the MTV Movie Awards, Russia (2007, nominated - Renata Litvinova)
- Best Actor at the Sochi Open Russian Film Festival (2006, won - Aleksandr Yatsenko)
- Best Actress at the Sochi Open Russian Film Festival (2006, won - Renata Litvinova)
- Grand Prize at the Sochi Open Russian Film Festival (2006, nominated)
- Best film, Golden Eagle Award (2006, nominated)
