= Scarecrow (2020 film) =

- Directed by: Dmitry Davydov
- Written by: Dmitry Davydov
- Produced by: Dmitry Davydov
- Starring: Valentina Romanova-Chyskyyray; Anatoly Struchkov; Artur Zakharov; Anilena Guryeva
- Cinematography: Ivan Semyonov
- Music by: Sergey Yarmonov
- Production company: Bonfire Productions
- Distributed by: Pro:vzglyad
- Release dates: September 2020 (Kinotavr); February 25, 2021 (Russia)
- Running time: 72 minutes
- Country: Russia
- Language: Yakut

Scarecrow (Russian: Пугало, romanized: Pugalo) is a 2020 Russian drama film directed by Dmitry Davydov. Laureate of the main prize of the 31st Kinotavr Film Festival. It is scheduled to be theatrically released on February 25, 2021 by Pro:vzglyad.

== Plot ==
The film tells about a healer and a hermit woman, whom people are afraid of, but despite this, they turn to her for help.

== Cast ==
- Valentina Romanova-Chyskyyray as Scarecrow
- Anatoly Struchkov
- Artur Zakharov
- Anilena Guryeva
