= Vanished Empire =

- Russian: Исчезнувшая империя
- Directed by: Karen Shakhnazarov
- Written by: Evgeniy Nikishov; Sergey Rokotov
- Produced by: Galina Shadur; Karen Shakhnazarov
- Starring: Aleksandr Lyapin; Lidiya Milyuzina; Egor Baranovskiy; Ivan Kupreenko; Armen Dzhigarkhanyan
- Cinematography: Shandor Berkeshi
- Edited by: Irina Kozhemyakina
- Music by: Konstantin Shevelyov
- Release date: 2008
- Country: Russia
- Language: Russian

Vanished Empire (Russian: Исчезнувшая империя, romanized: Ischeznuvshaya imperiya) is a 2008 Russian drama film directed by Karen Shakhnazarov.

== Plot ==
The film tells of two guys studying at the same institute and in love with one girl. They do not even suspect that their country will soon fall apart.

== Cast ==
- Aleksandr Lyapin as Sergei Narbekov
- Lidiya Milyuzina as Lyuda Beletskaya
- Egor Baranovskiy as Stepan Molodtsov
- Ivan Kupreenko as Kostya Denisov
- Armen Dzhigarkhanyan as Sergei's grandfather
- Olga Tumaykina as Sergei's mother
- Vladimir Ilyin as Stepan 30 years later
- Tatyana Yakovenko as Lyuda's mother
- Yanina Kalganova as Katya
- Vasiliy Shakhnazarov as Misha (as Vasya Shakhnazarov)

== Reception ==
=== Critical response ===
Vanished Empire has an approval rating of 75% on review aggregator website Rotten Tomatoes, based on 12 reviews, and an average rating of 5.90/10.
