= Dmitry Davydov (filmmaker) =

Russian film director

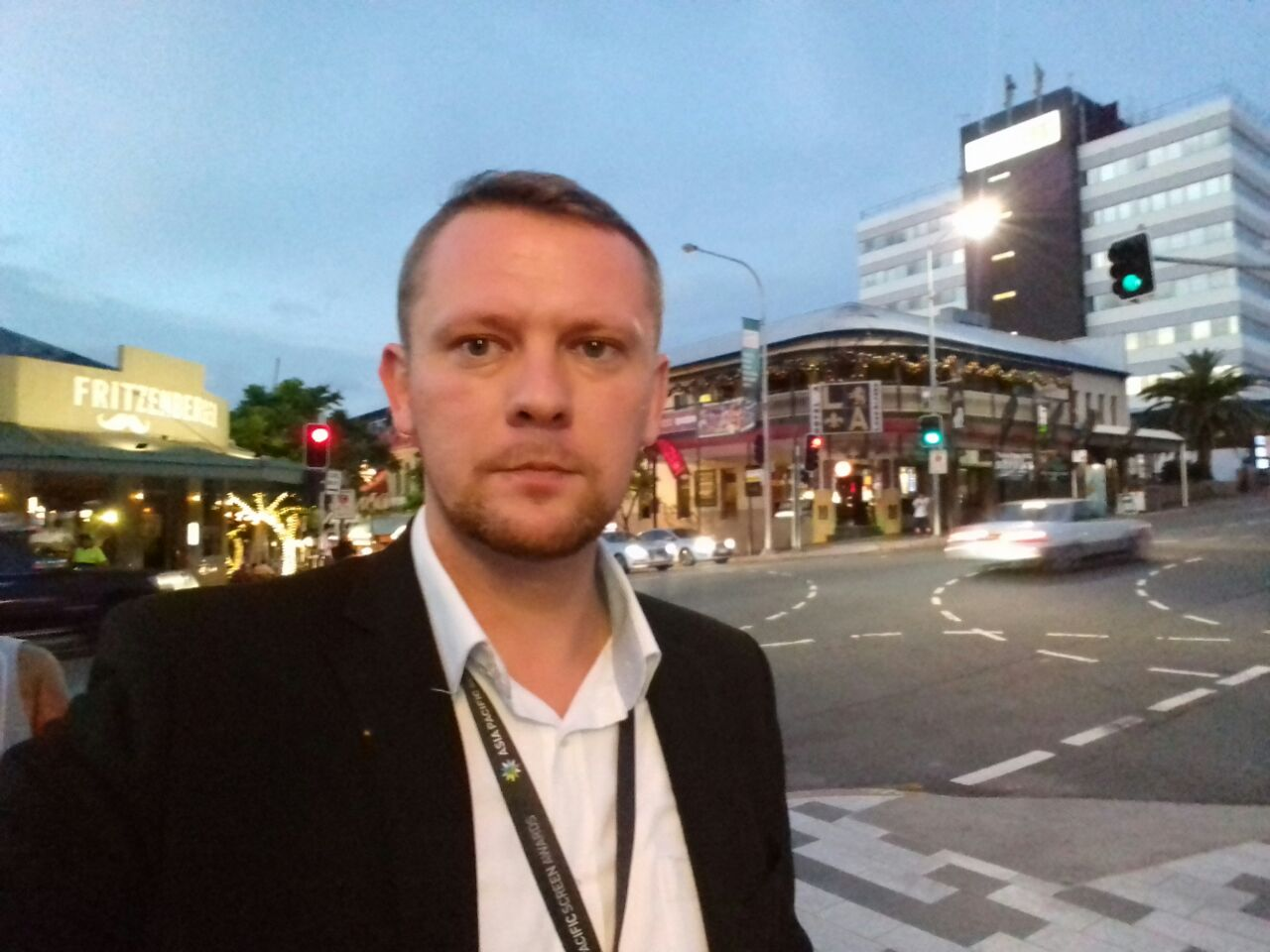
Dmitry Leonidovich Davydov in Brisbane, Australia

Dmitry Leonidovich Davydov (Russian: Дмитрий Леонидович Давыдов, Amga, Sakha Republic, Russia; was born February 22, 1983) is a Russian film director. His first film, Bonfire, was screened at the 21st Busan International Film Festival, and won an award for best dramatic feature at the imagineNATIVE Film + Media Arts Festival in Toronto. It was nominated for the Asia Pacific Screen Awards. This is the first film produced in the Sakha Republic which won a festival award outside of Russia. On April 29, 2017 he won an award best film director at the national filmfestival named #DVIZHENIE (Omsk city).

Davydov was born in Amga. His mother is Russian, his father is Yakut. Dmitry first studied at the Pedagogical Gymnasium in Amga, then at the Pedagogical University in Neryungri. He subsequently returned to Amga and took a job as a schoolteacher. He now works in Chapchylgan, Amginsky District, Sakha Republic, as the director of the Filipp Lobanov Chapchylgan School. He is married and has two children.

Davydov has no training in cinema, except for attending several master classes in Yakutsk. His directing career actually began in a Yakutsk school in 2009, where as a teacher he led optional video courses for students. One day he saw that there was a demand for films in the native ethnic language among the locals in Yakutia and decided to make them. All of his films are shown, including at cinemas and festivals, in the Yakut dialect with Russian subtitles. He produced the screenplay for Bonfire himself, writing it in Russian; the screenplay was later translated to Sakha. To produce the film, Davydov had to take a loan. The characters are played by inhabitants of Amga, who by no means are professional actors. A peculiarity of his directorial style is shooting only in his native region of Yakutia and uniquely short filming periods, for example, for "Pugalo" he spent only 11 filming days. He financed all of his films from his own funds, which he took mostly from loans. His budgets are always incredibly small for the modern film industry. For example, for his popular film "Pugalo" Davydov spent only 1.5 million rubles.
