= Anna Ukolova =

Russian theater and film actress

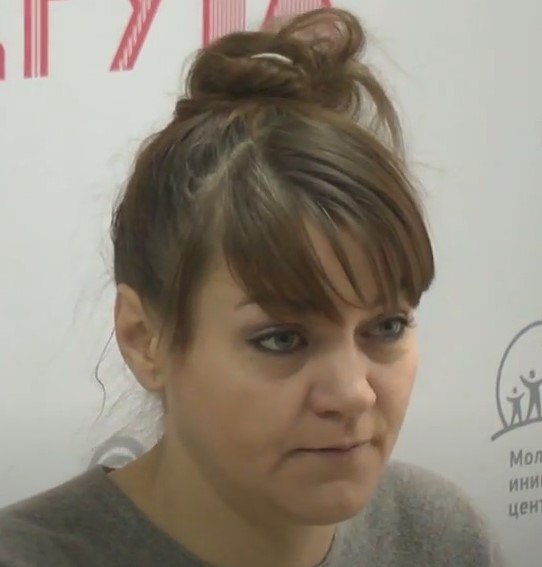
- Born: Anna Viktorovna Ukolova; 15 February 1978 (age 48); Sborno-Simonovsky, Syzransky District, Samara Oblast, RSFSR, USSR
- Occupation: Actress
- Years active: 2000–present

Anna Viktorovna Ukolova (Russian: А́нна Ви́кторовна Уко́лова; born February 15, 1978) is a Russian theater and film actress.

== Biography ==
Anna Ukolova was born in the village of Sborno-Simonovsky (now Sbornyy), Syzransky District, Samara Oblast, Russian SFSR, Soviet Union (now Russia).

After graduating from high school, Ukolova completed a course at the Samara Institute of Culture and Arts. She then attended the Russian Academy of Theatre Arts - GITIS. In 2001 Anna graduated with honors from the academy and was accepted into the troupe of the Moon Theatre of Sergei Prokhanov.

== Selected filmography ==
- 2002 — All That You Love as Lenochka, basketball player
- 2002 — The Law as Lyuba Orlova
- 2002 — Kamenskaya 2 as Anna Lazareva
- 2004 — Sarkanā Kapela as Marta
- 2004 — Daddy as Arisha
- 2006 — Nine Lives of Nestor Makhno as Maria Nikiforova
- 2006 — Alive as Syomina
- 2006 — Piranha as Nina
- 2006 — The Spot as Anya
- 2009 — Scatty as Ksenia
- 2009 — The Miracle as Galya
- 2010 — The Edge as Matilda
- 2012 — Living as Artyom's mother
- 2013 — The Geographer Drank His Globe Away as Vetka
- 2014 — Leviathan as Anzhela
- 2017 — The Ivanovs vs. The Ivanovs as Lidia
- 2017 — Light Up! as Vera
- 2018 — House Arrest as Nina Samsonova
- 2020 — Streltsov as episode
- 2020 — White Snow as Yelena Vyalbe's mother
- 2020 — Zoya as Agrafena Smirnova

== Personal life ==
- Husband — Sergey Pugachev, businessman
  - Son — Makar (born 19 May 2011)

== Awards and nominations ==
- 2006: Chicago International Film Festival — Silver Hugo Award for Best Actress (The Spot; with Darya Moroz and Viktoriya Isakova)
- 2015: Nika Award — nomination for Best Supporting Actress (Leviathan)
