= My Step Brother Frankenstein =

- Russian: Мой сводный брат Франкенштейн
- Directed by: Valery Todorovsky
- Written by: Gennady Ostrovsky
- Produced by: Leonid Yarmolnik
- Starring: Leonid Yarmolnik; Daniil Spivakovsky; Elena Yakovleva; Artyom Shalimov; Marianna Ilyina; Sergey Gazarov; Sergey Garmash
- Cinematography: Sergey Mikhalchuk
- Edited by: Alla Strelnikova
- Music by: Alexei Aigui
- Release date: 2004
- Country: Russia
- Language: Russian

My Step Brother Frankenstein (Russian: Мой сводный брат Франкенштейн, romanized: Moy svodnyy brat Frankenshteyn) is a 2004 Russian drama film directed by Valery Todorovsky.

== Plot ==
The film is about a man who learns that he has an adult son, who became disabled in the Chechen war. He thinks that the war is still ongoing and needs to protect a new family.

== Cast ==
- Leonid Yarmolnik as Yulik
- Daniil Spivakovsky as Pavlik
- Elena Yakovleva as Rita
- Artyom Shalimov as Yegor
- Marianna Ilyina as Anya
- Sergey Gazarov as Edik
- Sergey Garmash as Kurbatov
- Elvira Danilina as Galina
- Vladimir Bogdanov as Ryvzh
- Tatyana Shumova as Arina
- Sergey Yakubenko as Feliks
- Darya Belousova as Sveta
