= Roads to Koktebel =

2003 film

- Film poster
- Directed by: Boris Khlebnikov; Aleksey Popogrebskiy
- Written by: Boris Khlebnikov; Aleksey Popogrebskiy
- Starring: Gleb Puskepalis
- Cinematography: Shandor Berkeshi
- Edited by: Ivan Lebedev
- Release date: 25 June 2003
- Running time: 100 minutes
- Country: Russia
- Language: Russian

Roads to Koktebel (Russian: Коктебель, romanized: Koktebel) is a 2003 Russian adventure drama film directed by Boris Khlebnikov and Aleksey Popogrebskiy.

== Plot ==
A boy with his father go to the sea. They come in a freight car in the trucker's cabin. They go from house to house, by forest, by field. In Moscow they have nothing left. And there, by the sea is hope of a new happy life beginning. For the father, the road is an attempt to regain faith in himself, and the friendship and trust of his son. The boy's target objective is the Koktebel village, in Crimea, where in the hills near the sea a wind is constantly blowing, where the albatross soars.

== Cast ==
- Gleb Puskepalis as The Son
- Igor Chernevich as The Father
- Evgeniy Sytyy as Railway inspector
- Vera Sandrykina as Tanya
- Vladimir Kucherenko as Mikhail
- Agrippina Steklova as Kseniya
- Aleksandr Ilin as Truck driver
- Anna Frolovtseva as Tenant

== Awards ==
It was entered into the 25th Moscow International Film Festival where it won the Special Silver St. George. It also won the FIPRESCI prize in Moscow.

At the Karlovy Vary International Film Festival the film won the Philip Morris Film Prize (Boris Khlebnikov, Aleksey Popogrebskiy).
