= Old Women =

- Russian: Старухи
- Directed by: Gennady Sidorov
- Written by: Gennady Sidorov
- Produced by: Gennady Sidorov
- Starring: Valentina Berezutskaya; Tamara Klimova; Anastasia Lyubimova; Zoya Norkina; Galina Smirnova; Bronislava Zakharova
- Cinematography: Anatoli Petriga
- Music by: Andrey Khudyakov
- Release date: 2003
- Country: Russia
- Language: Russian

Old Women (Russian: Старухи, romanized: Starukhi) is a 2003 Russian drama film directed by Gennady Sidorov.

== Plot ==
The film takes place in a village where several old women live. Suddenly a family of Uzbeks moved to the village and not everyone likes it.

== Cast ==
- Valentina Berezutskaya
- Tamara Klimova
- Anastasia Lyubimova
- Zoya Norkina
- Galina Smirnova
- Bronislava Zakharova
