= Pravednik =

Pravednik Tzadik
- Theatrical release poster
- English: Tzadik
- Directed by: Sergei Ursuliak
- Written by: Gennady Ostrovsky
- Produced by: Anton Zlatopolsky; Timur Weinstein; Leonid Vereschagin; Nikita Mikhalkov; Mariya Ushakova; Vadim Vereshchagin; Yuliya Sumachyova
- Starring: Aleksandr Yatsenko; Sergei Makovetsky; Fyodor Dobronravov; Evgeniy Tkachuk; Mark Eidelstein; Lyubov Konstantinova; Konstantin Khabensky
- Cinematography: Mikhail Milashin
- Music by: Vasily Tonkovidov
- Production companies: Russia-1; Central Partnership Productions; Moskino Film Studio; Studio Trite; WeiT Media
- Distributed by: Central Partnership
- Release date: February 16, 2023 (Russia)
- Running time: 163 minutes
- Country: Russia
- Languages: Russian, Hebrew, Yiddish, English
- Budget: ₽719 million
- Box office: ₽638 million; $7.8 million

Pravednik or Tzadik in English (Russian: Праведник, romanized: Pravednik, known as The Righteous in English) is a 2023 Russian World War II film directed by Sergei Ursuliak. The historical drama film is based on the real story of the Soviet partisan officer the Avenger detachment, Nikolai Kiselev (played by Aleksandr Yatsenko), who saved over 200 Jews from the Nazis in World War II.

This film was theatrically released on February 16, 2023.

== Plot ==
The film takes place in 1942, during the Great Patriotic War (World War II). The film is based on real events that took place during the Second World War between August and October 1942, when Russian soldier and Soviet partisan officer Nikolai Kiselev rescued 218 Jews from the Holocaust. The story begins when Kiselev receives the order to evacuate over two hundred Jews, including old men, women and children, from Belorussian-occupied territories behind the front lines, after Hitler had declared Belarus a Jew-free (judenfrei) territory. The emaciated people, tormented by hunger and fear, who had lost their relatives and had almost lost their minds from the horror they experienced, would have to walk hundreds of kilometres through the forest paths to recover the faith and hope of a better world.

== Cast ==
- Aleksandr Yatsenko as Captain Nikolay Kiselyov (soldier), Red Army officer, commander of a partisan detachment (Nikolai Kiselev in English)
- Sergei Makovetsky as Ruvim Yankel
- Fyodor Dobronravov as Voronyansky, commander of the partisan detachment People's Avengers
- Evgeniy Tkachuk as Nikishin (Ferz)
- Doval'e Glickman as Moshe Tal
  - Mark Eidelstein as Moshe Tal in his youth
- Yuliya Vetruk as Lyubov
- Lyubov Konstantinova as Anna Sirotina
- Maria Zolotukhina as Tova Lipnitskaya
- Ronald Pelin as Yoni Hirschmann
- Konstantin Khabensky as Avigdor
- Chulpan Khamatova as Rita

== Production ==
The film was directed by Sergei Ursuliak.

It was a joint production of WeiT Media, Central Partnership, Nikita Mikhalkov's Studio TriTe, and the Russia-1 TV channel, with the support of the Cinema Fund and the Kievskaya Ploshchad Group of Companies.

=== Filming locations ===
Location filming process took place on August 5, 2021. It took place in the village of Zabrodje, Vileyka District, Minsk Region in Belarus, the cities of Saint Petersburg, Vyborg, and Leningrad Oblast in Russia, and in Israel. In Belarus, the film team worked exactly in those places where historical events unfolded.

== Release ==
On February 8, 2023, the premiere of the film took place at the Karo 11 October cinema center on New Arbat Avenue in Moscow. The film premiered on February 15, 2023 in Saint Petersburg at the Lenfilm cinema, and the film was released in the Russian Federation on February 16, 2023 by Central Partnership.

== Reception ==
The film enjoyed great success at the box office.
