= Khrustalyov, My Car! =

1998 film by Aleksei Yuryevich German

- Directed by: Aleksei German
- Written by: Aleksei German; Svetlana Karmalita
- Produced by: Aleksandr Golutva; Armen Medvedev; Guy Séligmann
- Starring: Yuriy Tsurilo
- Cinematography: Vladimir Ilyin
- Edited by: Irina Gorokhovskaya
- Music by: Andrey Petrov
- Distributed by: PolyGram Filmed Entertainment
- Release date: May 20, 1998
- Running time: 150 minutes
- Countries: Russia; France
- Language: Russian

Khrustalyov, My Car! (Russian: Хрусталёв, машину!, romanized: Khrustalyov, mashinu!) is a 1998 Russian comedy-drama film directed by Aleksei German and written by German and Svetlana Karmalita. It was produced by Canal+, CNC, Goskino, Lenfilm and VGTRK.

== Plot ==
On the first day of the cold spring of 1953, two events occur, though they are not comparable in importance: Fireman Fedya Aramyshev is arrested, and "the greatest leader of all times and peoples," Joseph Stalin, is found lying on the floor of his dacha.

Some time before these incidents, we see events from the life of General Yuri Klensky, who serves in the military-medical service. In the Soviet Union, the Doctors' plot, in which a group of predominantly Jewish doctors is accused of conspiring to kill Stalin, is in full swing. Klensky, himself Jewish, attempts to console himself with near-constant drunkenness, hoping that Soviet justice will not reach him. However, a series of events suggests that Klensky's hopes are futile, and that his arrest is imminent. In an early scene, the general encounters his own double in the hospital, and later, a "foreigner" arrives at his home, bearing news about a relative who allegedly lives abroad. Suspecting a provocation, Klensky throws the "foreigner" down the stairs, but a local informant manages to report the doctor's contact with foreigners to the senior officers of the MGB in time.

Klensky tries to escape but ends up getting arrested. His family is evicted and placed in a crowded communal apartment, and Klensky himself, after being detained, is left to the criminals, who brutally beat and rape him. But then a miracle happens: the bloodied general is driven directly from his cell to the countryside to treat a certain "high-ranking" patient. To Klensky's shock, this patient turns out to be the "Great Leader." Stalin's condition is hopeless—he is dying, wheezing, and agonizing. Beria's voice, full of triumph, utters the first sentence of post-Stalinist Russia: "Khrustalyov, My Car!"

Klensky is immediately released, but he does not return to medicine. Instead, the general "goes to the people." At the end of the film, he is the commandant of a train. Drinking happily, he balances a glass of port on his shaved head.

== Cast ==
- Yuri Tsurilo as general Yuri Georgievich Klensky
- Nina Ruslanova as the general's wife
- Mikhail Dementyev as the general's son
- Jüri Järvet Jr. as a Finnish reporter
- Aleksandr Bashirov as Fedya Aramyshev
- Ivan Matskevich as the general's lookalike
- Paulina Myasnikova as the general's mother
- Viktor Mikhaylov as the general's driver
- Nijolė Narmontaite as Sonya
- Olga Samoshina as a teacher in love
- Genrietta Yanovskaya as the general's sister
- Evgeniy Vazhenin as an officer in plainclothes
- Aleksei Zharkov as the head of the Ministry of Internal Affairs of USSR
- Aleksandr Lykov as a convict-driver
- Yuriy Nifontov as Tolik
- Konstantin Vorobyov as a guard at the general's clinic
- Ali Misirov as Joseph Stalin
- Mulid Makoev as Lavrentiy Beria

=== Uncredited appearances ===
- Viktor Stepanov as Terenty Fomich
- Vladimir Maschenko as chief of the GPU
- Valery Filonov as KGB officer "Pobuzhinsky"
- Nikolay Dick as inspector
- Sergei Diachkov as cadet
- Sergei Russkin as KGB officer
- Sergey Lanbamin as Junior Lieutenant
- Dmitri Prigov as general anesthesiologist in the clinic
- Konstantin Khabensky as orchestra musician with Bengal lights
- Mikhail Trukhin as Conductor
- Gennady Chetverikov as underworld boss
- Anatoly Shvedersky as general doctor in the clinic
- Evgeny Filatov as general doctor in the clinic

== Production ==
Production of Khrustalyov, My Car! took seven years for writer-director Aleksei German to finish. German was able to bring the film to completion through financial backing from France.

== Reception ==
The film premiered at the 51st Cannes Film Festival on May 20, 1998 as part of the main competition for the Palme d'Or award.

=== Critical response ===
During the Cannes premiere of Khrustalyov, My Car!, numerous critics walked out of the screening in disapproval due to its obtuse narrative and lengthy "unfunny" scenes of visual satire. However, film director Martin Scorsese, the jury president for Cannes in 1998, considered it to be the best film in the festival that year. Jacques Mandelbaum of Le Monde also gave the film praise, writing that it is a "carnivalesque record of the Soviet era", and belongs to a category of cinema that "challenges all categories of taste". Writing in 1999, Jean-Marc Durand of the Lyon-based newspaper Le Progrès stated that the film is "incomprehensible, but bewitching", and compared its director Aleksei German to Italian filmmaker Federico Fellini.

Upon its re-release by Arrow Films in December 2018, the film was given renewed critical acclaim. Khrustalyov, My Car! has an approval rating of 100% on review aggregator website Rotten Tomatoes, based on 7 reviews, and an average rating of 8.2/10. British film critic Peter Bradshaw of The Guardian gave the film five out of five stars, describing it as "a surreal fantasia-epic and nihilist political satire of cynicism and violence". Tara Brady of The Irish Times gave it four out of five stars, stating that "People come and go without introduction or elucidation. All of them are in keeping with the Soviet auteur’s grim view of humanity."

=== Accolades ===
At the 1999 Russian Guild of Film Critics Awards the picture was awarded as Best Film and Aleksei German received the Best Director prize.
