= Anna's War =

2018 film by Aleksey Fedorchenko

- Directed by: Aleksey Fedorchenko
- Screenplay by: Aleksey Fedorchenko; Natalia Meshchaninova
- Produced by: Andrei Savelyev; Artyom Vasilyev; Maksim Lozhevsky
- Starring: Marta Kozlova
- Cinematography: Alisher Khamidhodzhaev
- Edited by: Pavel Khanyutin; Herve Schnaid
- Music by: Vladimir Komarov; Atsuo Matsumoto
- Production companies: 29th February Film Company; Metrafilms; Saga Film Studio
- Release date: 28 January 2018
- Running time: 75 min.
- Country: Russia
- Language: Russian

Anna's War (Russian: Война Анны, romanized: Voyna Anny) is a 2018 Russian drama film directed by Aleksey Fedorchenko. It premiered at the International Film Festival Rotterdam in January 2018.

On 25 January 2019 the film won the Russian Golden Eagle Award in the Best Film category. Fedorchenko won the award for Best Director.

The plot was based on the short story Ghost by Dmitri Khotckevich, a true story of his neighbor pani Ada (missis Ada), which he published earlier at livejournal under the nick storyofgrubas.

== Plot ==
A little girl, Anna (Marta Kozlova), miraculously survived the execution of local Jews, after her mother covered her with her body. She hides in the chimney of a Ukrainian school, which came to be used as the Nazi's headquarters for the duration of the Nazi German occupation. Anna watches war and life from her cover.
