= A Stoker =

2010 Russian crime film directed by Aleksey Balabanov

- Film poster
- Russian: Кочегар
- Directed by: Aleksey Balabanov
- Written by: Aleksey Balabanov
- Produced by: Sergey Selyanov
- Starring: Mikhail Skryabin; Yuriy Matveev; Aleksandr Mosin; Aida Tumutova; Anna Korotayeva
- Cinematography: Aleksandr Simonov
- Music by: Valeriy Didyulya
- Release date: 13 October 2010
- Running time: 90 minutes
- Country: Russia
- Language: Russian

A Stoker (Russian: Кочегар), also known as The Stoker, is a 2010 Russian crime film directed by Aleksey Balabanov. The film takes place in St. Petersburg in the 1990s. Main character is a retired major who served in the Soviet Army during Soviet–Afghan War. He works as a stoker and disposes bodies of people killed by local Mafia, which is headed by one of his former comrades from the Soviet Army.

== Cast ==
- Mikhail Skryabin as Stoker
- Yuriy Matveev as Vassily 'Bizon' - lover of Sasha and Masha
- Aleksandr Mosin as Sergeant - father of Masha
- Aida Tumutova as Sasha - daughter of Ivan Skryabin
- Anna Korotayeva as Masha - daughter of Sergeant
- Varvara Belokurova as Vera - daughter of Colonel Minayev
- Roman Burenkov as Gosha
- Filipp Dyachkov as Yasha
- Aleksandr Garkushenko as Kostya
- Kirill Komlev as Bartender

== Synopsis ==
The film takes place in the mid-1990s. The main character, Ivan "Yakut" Matveyevich Skryabin, lives in a firehouse where he works as a stoker. He is a Yakut by nationality, a retired major, a sapper, a Hero of the Soviet Union, and a shell-shocked veteran of the Afghan war. In his free time, he types on an old typewriter, trying to type from memory the story Khailakh by the Polish ethnographer Wacław Sieroszewski, which he read before the Afghan war (the "khailakhs" were exiled criminals who were settled with the Yakuts after serving their sentences). Sometimes two seven-year-old girls, Lena and Vera, come to the stoker's room, to whom Yakut tells the plot of the story. Vera’s father, a military pilot who transported weapons in the Middle East, also comes to the firehouse.

Yakut's friends from the war, the talkative sniper "Sergeant" Mikhail and the silent cryptographer Vasily "Bison", who became bandits and murderers in the 1990s, bring the corpses of their victims to the firehouse for disposal. As they dispose of two bodies, Sergeant and Bison explain to Yakut that these are the corpses of bad people: "one, a businessman, ordered a hit on two friends, they took the hitman - and he paid off... And the second, like your Khailakh, killed people for money." Up to a certain point, Yakut believes his former comrades.

Bison has an intimate relationship with the daughters of Yakut and Sergeant (Sasha and Masha, respectively), who are co-owners of a store selling fur from Yakutia. When Masha finds out that Sasha is also Bison's lover, she decides to have her killed. Under the pretext that the business is established and can be run without Sasha, who, as co-owner, has the right to half the profits, she comes to her father and asks to kill her. Sergeant entrusts this matter to Bison, who, without hesitation, kills Sasha with a knife. Bison wraps Sasha's corpse in a bag and takes her to Yakut to be disposed. Yakut, unsuspecting, noticed a shoe that had fallen out of the bag, which he bought for her as a gift before.

Now suspicious, Yakut decides to visit his daughter. He goes to her store, and, not finding her there, goes to her apartment. Seeing a second identical shoe there, he realizes what occurred. He changes into his full officer's uniform with awards and the star of the Hero of the Soviet Union, goes to Sergeant's home, picks up a ski pole, and mercilessly thrusts it into Sergeant's heart, killing him. Bison arrives immediately after - Yakut kills him by stabbing him in the neck, after which he returns to the firehouse.

At the firehouse, Yakut encounters Vera. In response to her request to hear the end of the story, he tells her that everything ended well and Khailakh was punished, and hastily sends the girl home. Then, sitting down in front of the furnace fire, Yakut slits his wrists, committing suicide. Vera she returns to the firehouse and asks Yakut's permission to take a photo of him with a Polaroid camera, but receives no answer and takes the photo. Seeing blood on his sleeve, Vera takes the unfinished story and leaves. At the end, Vera's voiceover reads the story, illustrated by a silent black-and-white film - it is about a Russian khailakh, Kostya, who was sent to Yakutia as punishment. In Yakutia, Kostya abuses the family hosting him, beating the husband and raping the wife.

== Reception ==
=== Critical response ===
A Stoker has an approval rating of 100% on review aggregator website Rotten Tomatoes, based on 8 reviews, and an average rating of 7.40/10.
