= Paper Soldier =

- Russian: Бумажный солдат
- Directed by: Aleksey German Jr.
- Written by: Vladimir Arkusha; Aleksey German Jr.; Julia Glezarova
- Produced by: Sergey Shumakov; Artem Vasilyev
- Starring: Merab Ninidze; Chulpan Khamatova; Anastasiya Shevelyova; Aleksandr Glebov; Ruslan Ibragimov
- Cinematography: Maksim Drozdov; Alisher Khamidkhodzhaev
- Music by: Aleksey Rybnikov
- Release date: 2008
- Country: Russia
- Language: Russian

Paper Soldier (Russian: Бумажный солдат) is a 2008 Russian drama film directed by Aleksey German Jr. For his film, German received the Silver Lion and Golden Osella for Best Cinematography from the 65th Venice International Film Festival.

== Plot ==
The film tells about the doctor Daniil Pokrovsky, who is preparing the squad of the first cosmonauts for spacewalk.

The title is a reference to a Russian song about a soldier who bravely steps into a fire, unaware that he's actually just a toy made of paper.

== Cast ==
- Merab Ninidze as Doctor Daniil Pokrovsky
- Chulpan Khamatova as Nina, Daniil's Wife
- Anastasiya Shevelyova as Vera
- Aleksandr Glebov as David
- Ruslan Ibragimov as Adrian Nikolayev
- Fyodor Lavrov as German Titov
- Polina Filonenko as Misha's Friend
- Valentin Kuznetsov as Yuri Gagarin
- Kirill Ulyanov as Garik
- Ramil Salakhutdinov as Misha

== Reception ==
Slant Magazine said that the film "harkens back to Russian cinema of the ’60s" and gave it 3.5 of 4 stars. The review called Merab Ninidze's performance (as Doctor Daniil Pokrovsky) "mesmerizing" and the cinematography "exquisite" in a "tightly paced drama."
