= Free Floating =

- Russian: Свободное плавание
- Directed by: Boris Khlebnikov
- Written by: Boris Khlebnikov; Aleksandr Rodionov
- Produced by: Roman Borisevich
- Starring: Aleksandr Yatsenko; Evgeniy Sytyy; Pyotr Zaychenko; Boris Petrov; Darya Ekamasova
- Cinematography: Shandor Berkeshi
- Edited by: Ivan Lebedev
- Release date: 2006
- Country: Russia
- Language: Russian

Free Floating (Russian: Свободное плавание) is a 2006 Russian comedy film directed by Boris Khlebnikov.

== Plot ==
The film tells about a 20-year-old guy who lives in a small town in which the only factory is suddenly closed. He works in the market, goes to various discos and constantly receives rejections about employment. And suddenly he sees a barge that will take him away from here.

== Cast ==
- Aleksandr Yatsenko as Lyonya
- Evgeniy Sytyy as Brigade-leader Roslov
- Pyotr Zaychenko as Elderly man from brigade
- Boris Petrov as Big man from brigade
- Darya Ekamasova as Piggy
- Nina Semyonova as Lyonya's mother
- Tagir Rakhimov as Poor man
- Sergey Nasedkin as Foreman Volodya
- Vladimir Tereshchenko as Vitya
- Dmitri Shvetsov as Andrei
