= Arrhythmia (film) =

- Directed by: Boris Khlebnikov
- Screenplay by: Boris Khlebnikov; Natalya Meshchaninova
- Produced by: Ruben Dishdishyan; Sergey Selyanov; Natalya Drozd; Aleksi Hyvärinen; Eva Blondiau
- Starring: Aleksandr Yatsenko; Irina Gorbacheva
- Cinematography: Alisher Khamidkhodzhaev
- Edited by: Ivan Lebedev; Yulia Batalova
- Production companies: CTB Film Company; Color of May; Don Films; Mars Media Entertainment; Post Control
- Release date: September 28, 2017
- Running time: 116 minutes
- Countries: Russia; Finland; Germany
- Language: Russian
- Box office: $1,433,366

Arrhythmia (Russian: Аритми́я) is a 2017 Russian drama film directed by Boris Khlebnikov. The film was an entry in the contest Kinotavr, and it released on 28 September 2017. The film follows Oleg, a paramedic devoted to his patients. Oleg struggles to make time for his wife, who begins to believe his patients are more important to him than she is.

== Plot ==
Oleg is a young gifted paramedic. He likes to get drunk after each shift. His wife Katya, a doctor, works at the hospital emergency department. She loves Oleg but is fed up with him caring more about patients than her. She tells him she wants a divorce. However, they have to remain living together until Oleg finds a new place. In the meantime, the new head of Oleg's EMA substation is a cold-hearted manager who's got new strict rules to implement. Oleg couldn't care less about the rules - he's got lives to save. His attitude gets him in trouble with the new boss. The crisis at work coincides with the personal life crisis. Caught between emergency calls, alcohol-fueled off-shifts, and search for a meaning in life, Oleg and Katya have to find the binding force that keeps them together.

== Themes ==
The principle of morality in this film is a matter of choice for everybody. So, the truth becomes a cornerstone concept and a form-building element of the film. As we know, everyone has their own truth: Oleg's truth is life-saving, sometimes even at the expense of others’ lives; Katia's is an attempt to understand Oleg's space by separating from him.

== Artistic approach ==
Boris Khlebnikov's Arrhythmia, as well as A Long and Happy Life (Dolgaia i schastlivaia zhizn’, 2012), are about understanding, and about the alienation of modern man, about a kind of intolerance. At the same time the deep tragedy of the characters in Arrhythmia lies in the trivial drama of family relations. Khlebnikov's film is a modern story about eternal choices, because there are no bad or good characters.

The documentary stylistics of the wandering camera, the almost natural lighting, the lack of accompanying music form the brush that creates this lively and sincere portrait of a man. The truth lies in the severity of social and moral conflicts, in their clash and in the absence of smoothed corners of urgent contemporary issues, which incidentally are shown very delicately and without excessive hyperbolization or exaggeration. Therefore, the “trembling” camera and the sometimes ragged editing are carefully arranged accents by the director, who naturally focuses the viewer's attention on sincerity and genuine emotions. Due to the complex dramatic structure—similar to the rhythm of cardiogram, which soars up to small heights or victories and then falls again at emotionally and morally tense points—the film acquires a peculiar tempo, a swinging rhythm, which allows the action to be dragged out and sped up. This pattern embodies the principle of the natural flow of time, above all, in the space of the viewer's consciousness.

== Cast ==
Name	Role
Aleksandr Yatsenko	Oleg Mironov
Irina Gorbacheva	Irina
Nikolay Shrayber	Dima Yakushkin
Maksim Legashkin	Vitaliy Sergeevich Golovko
Sergey Nasedkin	Nikolaich
Aleksandr Samoylenko	Mikhail

== Release ==
=== Critical response and review ===
Arrhythmia has an approval rating of 100% on review aggregator website Rotten Tomatoes, based on 7 reviews, and an average rating of 8.00/10. In IMDb, the movie was rated by 4896 audience with an average rating of 7.4/10, signifying "generally favorable reviews". About 30.3% of the audience rated 8/10, and 25.6% of the audience rated 7/10. The Hollywood Reporter comment the camerawork in Arrhythmia as”a documentary-style naturalism that gives Arrhythmia more of a televisual than cinematic look”. The Karlovy Vary Film also review that the crema man present the “breakdown of allyship between them is encapsulated in a series of utterly believable interactions.”

Alexandra Porshneva reviewed that "The notorious subject of love that long ago turned into cheap boudoir clichés is saturated with the strongest images and highlighted by complex, subtle moments of pain. How vivid and poetic is the image of Oleg running away without looking back from his beloved, who carries away all his pain and fear: a man running to loneliness. We may contrast this scene with the previous one, showing the intimate affinity of husband and wife in the kitchen, which demonstrates close physical contact but, in fact, reveals complete alienation. Here is the effect of contradiction of action and feeling, which helps transmit the image of boundless love for a neighbor, for business, for life—as bright and accurate as possible. Surprisingly, the subtle acting here does not destroy the multi-layered action but only emphasizes the naturalness and “commonness” of what is happening. How flexible in her obstinacy is Irina Gorbacheva as Katia, how expressive in his vulnerability and even in infantility is Aleksandr Iatsenko as Oleg. Perhaps it will sound loud, but Arrhythmia is a most sincere film about love. This statement is reinforced by an obvious fact: it is about love as a feeling that is incredibly painful and strong, classed just as compassion and forgiveness...

It is important to feel the autumn air of a provincial city through a film: so simple and real, a bit cold due to the grey color of the new buildings. For a moment, even the cinematic space seemed more real than life, but after returning to the gloss of cyclic reality this viewer still wanted to get sick with arrhythmia again."

=== Accolades ===
In June 2017, Arrhythmia won the Grand Prix, Best Actor (Aleksander Yatsenko) and the Audience Award at the Kinotavr festival in Sochi, Russia.

At the Karlovy Vary International Film Festival the film received the award for Best Actor (Aleksander Yatsenko).

It was also screened at the Toronto International Film Festival (in the Contemporary World Cinema section).

=== Festivals and awards ===
Arrhythmia has screened at many festivals and won awards, including:

- 2017 28th Open Russian Film Festival "Kinotavr": Grand Prix, Best Male Actor (Alexander Yatsenko)
- 2017 52nd Karlovy Vary International Film Festival: Main Program Participant; Best Male Actor (Alexander Yatsenko)
- 2017 "Otkritie x Strelka" Film Festival: Opening Feature
- 2017 "Koroche" Short Film Festival: Special Feature
- 2017 7th Sakhalin "Krai Sveta" International Film Festival: Grand Prix, People's Choice Award, Best Male Actor (Alexander Yatsenko)
- 2017 Toronto International Film Festival: Contemporary World Cinema Program
- 2017 53rd Chicago International Film Festival: Best Male Actor (Alexander Yatsenko)
- 2017 11th "Sputnik nad Polshey" Russian Film Festival: Grand Prix, People's Choice Award
- 2017 24th Minsk International Film Festival "Listapad": Cinema without Border Award from the executive committee of the CIS, Best Actress (Irina Gorbacheva), Special Jury Award
- 2017 18th Arras Film Festival: French Film Critics Award, Special Jury Mention for the Best Male Actor (Alexander Yatsenko)
- 2017 25th Honfleur Festival of Russian Cinema (France): Grand Prix, People's Choice Award, Best Male Actor (Alexander Yatsenko)
- 2017 11th Asia Pacific Screen Awards: Jury Grand Prix (Alexander Yatsenko)
- 2017 24th Sozvezdie International Film Festival: Best Male Actor (Alexander Yatsenko), Best Supporting Male Actor (Maxim Lagashkin), Film President Award (Alexander Yatsenko, Irina Gorbacheva)
- 2017 "White Elephant" National Award of the Guild of Film Critics and Experts: Best Film, Best Director (Boris Khlebnikov), Best Screenplay (Natalia Meshchaninova, Boris Khlebnikov), Best Female Actor (Irina Gorbacheva), Best Male Actor (Alexander Yatsenko)
- 2017 2nd Ural Open Festival of Russian Cinema: Grand Prix, Best Actress (Irina Gorbacheva), Best Actor (Aleksander Yatsenko)
- 2017 13th Eurasia International Film Festival (Kazakhstan): FIPRESCI Grand Prize
- 2018 International Film Festival Rotterdam: "Voices" programme feature
- 2018 The Golden Eagle Award, Russia: Best Actress (Irina Gorbacheva)
- 2018 29th Trieste Film Festival: Trieste Award - Best Feature Film
- 2018 21st "Blockbuster" Award: Prize of the Chief Editor of the "Kinobusiness" magazine
- 2020 Etoiles et Toiles du Cinéma Européen: the Odyssée-Council of Europe Prize for Artistic Creation
