= Snegir =

Three Minutes of Silence
- Theatrical release poster
- Directed by: Boris Khlebnikov
- Written by: Boris Khlebnikov; Nataliya Meshchaninova; Georgi Vladimov
- Based on: Three Minutes of Silence by Georgi Vladimov
- Produced by: Sergey Selyanov (ru); Natalya Drozd; Natalya Smirnova; Tatyana Bonakova
- Starring: Makar Khlebnikov; Oleg Savostyuk; Aleksandr Robak; Timofey Tribuntsev; Yevgeny Sytyy
- Cinematography: Alisher Khamidkhodzhaev
- Edited by: Ivan Lebedev
- Music by: Maksim Belovolov
- Production companies: CTB Film Company; Globus Film Studio; Ministry of Culture
- Distributed by: Cinema Atmosphere
- Release date: June 8, 2023 (Russia)
- Running time: 116 minutes
- Country: Russia
- Language: Russian
- Budget: ₽300 million
- Box office: ₽55 million; $595.035

Three Minutes of Silence (Russian: Снегирь, romanized: Snegir, lit. 'Bullfinch') is a 2023 Russian coming-of-age disaster film written and directed by Boris Khlebnikov, created by the CTB Film Company with the support of the Ministry of Culture of the Russian Federation, a free adaptation of Georgi Vladimov's novel Three Minutes of Silence. Starring Makar Khlebnikov and Oleg Savostyuk as student sailors, with Aleksandr Robak and Timofey Tribuntsev about a battered seiner called "Bullfinch" and the trials that befell the crew of a fishing trawler.

It was theatrically released in Russia on June 8, 2023, by Cinema Atmosphere.

== Plot ==
A fishing ship called "Bullfinch" plows the sea in search of a catch of fish. The team on the fishing ship was hoping to get paid for their work. And at home, most of them are expected by relatives and loved ones.

But this time, two video bloggers wormed their way to the sailors - Nikita and Maxim. The guys went for sea romance, but the reality was not what they imagined: terrible pitching, piercing wind, icy cold, unbearable fishy smell and a harsh crew.

Suddenly, a severe storm hits a fishing seiner, and people find themselves in a deplorable situation. But, perhaps, someone is even worse than these heroes, and urgent help is needed.

== Cast ==
- Makar Khlebnikov as Nikita
- Oleg Savostyuk as Maxim
- Aleksandr Robak as Gennady
- Timofey Tribuntsev as Yuri "Yurik"
- Anatoly Popov as captain
- Vasiliy Shchipitsyn as Starpom
- Oleg Kamenshchikov as Evgeny
- Mikhail Kremer as Sergey "Seryoga"
- Vladimir Lukyanchikov as "Dimon"
- Yevgeny Sytyy as "Grandfather"
- Sergey Nasedkin as "Vitya"
- Konstantin Gayokho as Andrey, the Fishmaster
- Ilya Borisov as a sailor in Murmansk
- Veronika Aniskina as an investigator

== Production ==
Production was handled by CTB Film Company and Globus Film Studio. The Ministry of Culture of Russia provided significant assistance. The literary basis of the film's script was a novel by the Soviet writer Georgi Vladimov, substantially revised by Boris Khlebnikov, the director's son Makar Khlebnikov, an actor.

The script was created by the director in collaboration with Nataliya Meshchaninova based on the novel of the same name by Georgi Vladimov, published in 1969, at the end of the "thaw", which did not give the first post-war generation answers to their existential questions.

=== Filming ===
Filming for June is taking place in a huge pavilion located on the site of a former warehouse near Saint Petersburg and will last until mid-August, after which the filmmakers themselves repeatedly visited Murmansk and Teriberka in the Murmansk Oblast to shoot textures that you can't draw using graphics, until the end of September 2021.

== Release ==
=== Theatrical ===
The presentation of Boris Khlebnikov’s new work for a narrow circle of viewers took place in April 2023, and the opening film was premiered at the 45th Moscow International Film Festival will be held in Moscow from 20 to 27 April. The release of the tape is on June 8, 2023, by Cinema Atmosphere.
