= The Geographer Drank His Globe Away =

The Geographer Drank His Globe Away Географ глобус пропил
- Directed by: Alexander Veledinsky
- Written by: Alexander Veledinsky, Rauf Kubayev, Valery Todorovsky
- Produced by: Vadim Goryainov, Leonid Lebedev, Valery Todorovsky
- Starring: Konstantin Khabensky; Elena Lyadova; Anna Ukolova; Evgeniya Khirivskaya
- Cinematography: Vladimir Bashta
- Edited by: Alexander Veledinsky, Tatyana Prilenskaya
- Music by: Alexei Zubarev
- Production company: Marmot-film
- Distributed by: Krasnaya strela (Red Arrow)
- Release date: 7 November 2013
- Running time: 120 minutes
- Country: Russia
- Language: Russian
- Budget: 80 million rubles
- Box office: 200 million rubles

The Geographer Drank His Globe Away (Russian: Географ глобус пропил, romanized: Geograf Globus Propil) is a Russian drama film made in 2013, directed by Alexander Veledinsky, based on the novel of the same name by Alexei Ivanov. The action of the film, as opposed to the novel, has been transferred from the "dashing nineties" to the present day. The film participated in the XXIV Open Russian Film Festival "Kinotavr" in Sochi and was awarded the main prize. It was released on 7 November 2013.

== Plot ==
The main character, a biologist named Victor Sluzhkin, loses his job and, to make ends meet, is forced to take a job in a local school as a geography teacher. His family has little money and lives in a dilapidated apartment in an old Soviet era building. His best friend is having an affair with his wife. The students in his class do not respect him and the assistant principal does not like his teaching methods. He feels lonely and depressed. To deal with the stresses of life, he drinks a lot. His alcohol-fueled binges provide a temporary respite, but no lasting comfort. When he organizes a trip on the river with a group of students from his class, it turns into a journey of self-discovery both for him and for the young men and women from his class.

== Cast ==
- Konstantin Khabensky as Victor Sergeyevich Sluzhkin, geography teacher
- Elena Lyadova as Nadya, his wife
- Anna Ukolova as Vetka
- Evgeniya Khirivskaya as Kira
- Aleksandr Robak as Budkin
- Agrippina Steklova as Roza Borisovna, assistant principal
- Victor Uzun as principal
- Anfisa Chernykh as Masha Bolshakova
- Andrei Prytkov as Gradusov
- Ilya Ilyinykh as Ovechkin
- Mikhail Leontiev as Barmin
- Anastasia Zolotko as Tata

== Awards ==
- XXIV Open Russian Film Festival "Kinotavr" in Sochi
  - Main prize
  - Best Male Actor (Konstantin Khabensky)
  - Mikael Tariverdiev prize for Best Film Score (Alexei Zubarev)
  - Film distributors jury prize
  - Special prize of the magazine The Hollywood Reporter – Anfisa Chernykh
- 4th Odesa International Film Festival
  - Grand Prix "Golden Duke"
  - Viewers’ Choice Award
- 2013 Russian Guild of Film Critics Awards
  - Best Film
  - Best Male Actor (Konstantin Khabensky)
  - Best Female Actor (Elena Lyadova).
- Nika Award
  - Best Film
  - Best Male Actor (Konstantin Khabensky)
  - Best Female Actor (Elena Lyadova)
  - Best Director (Alexander Veledinsky)
  - Best Film Score (Alexey Zubarev)
- Golden Eagle Award
  - Best Director (Alexander Veledinsky)
  - Best Actor (Konstantin Khabensky)
  - Best Actress (Elena Lyadova)

== Reception ==
The film received critical acclaim in Russia and abroad. Ronnie Scheib from Variety wrote that "thanks to Konstantin Khabensky’s charismatic, sardonic performance as Victor, even personal deterioration proves fascinating and consistently entertaining".

== Production ==
Shooting of the film took place in 2011–2012, in Perm, Zakamsk, Lower Kuria district and Usva, Gremyachinsk district. The film shows the river Usva, down which the characters sail, and the Usva rock pillars. Stunts were performed on the Revun rapids of the river Iset in the Sverdlovsk region.

The music for the film was written by the guitarist of the "Aquarium" group, Alexei Zubarev. In addition, the film features a variety of songs – from classical to chanson. The film's trailer is accompanied by the song "I'm Free" by the "Kipelov" group. The same song is heard in the film, performed not by Kipelov but by one of the characters.

The film was shot over two years; there were 34 days of shooting, two expeditions and a planned five-month break. For the filming of the trip down the river it was necessary to wait for high water, which happens for only two weeks every May – the rest of the year the river is shallow. Winter scenes were shot in November 2011 and then there was a break until April to shoot scenes inside the school, when Spring was "looking in" through the windows. Then the crew moved over 200 km away from Perm to shoot the trip down the river.
