= Boris Khlebnikov =

Russian film director, screenwriter and producer

- Борис Хлебников
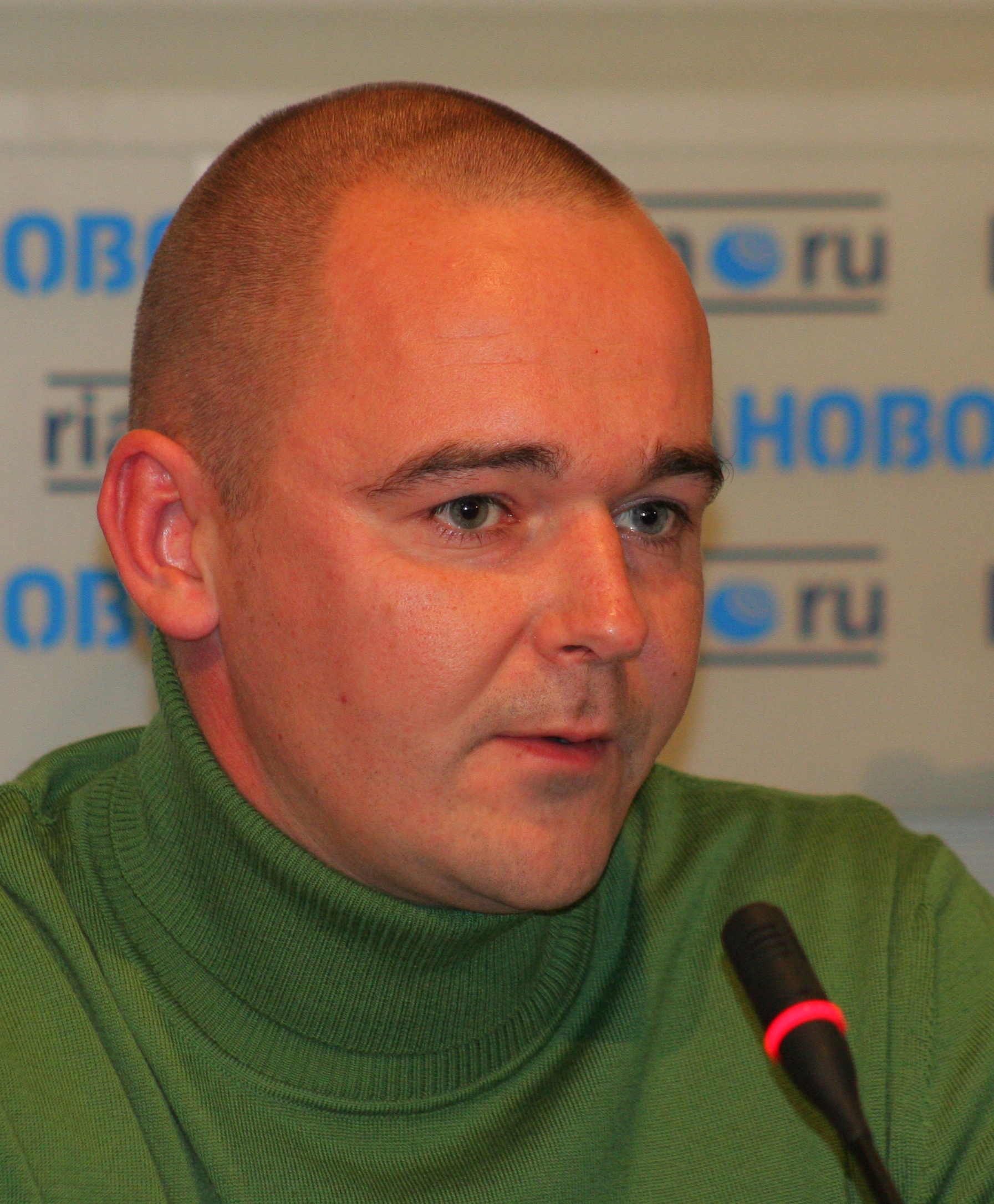
- Boris Khlebnikov 2010 Moscow
- Born: Boris Igorevich Khlebnikov; August 28, 1972 (age 52); Moscow, RSFSR, USSR
- Citizenship: Russian Federation
- Occupation(s): film director, film producer, screenwriter

Boris Igorevich Khlebnikov (Russian: Борис Игоревич Хлебников; born August 28, 1972) is a Russian film director, screenwriter and producer.

== Filmography ==
As director

- Roads to Koktebel (2003)
- Free Floating (2006)
- Help Gone Mad (2009)
- Crush (2009)
- Cherchill (2010)
- Bez svideteley (2012)
- Till Night Do Us Part (2012)
- A Long and Happy Life (2019)
- Hot and Bothered (2015)
- Arrhythmia (2017)
- Snegir (2023)

As screenwriter

- Roads to Koktebel (2003)
- Free Floating (2006)
- Help Gone Mad (2009)
- Crush (2009)
- Till Night Do Us Part (2012)
- A Long and Happy Life (2019)
- Arrhythmia (2017)
- Heart of the World (2018)
- Snegir (2023)
