= Wild Field =

2008 film by Mikheil Kalatozishvili

- Russian language film poster
- Russian: Дикое поле
- Directed by: Mikheil Kalatozishvili
- Screenplay by: Pyotr Lutsik; Aleksey Samoryadov
- Produced by: Mikheil Kalatozishvili; Andrey Bondarenko; Sergey Snezhkin
- Starring: Oleg Dolin; Roman Madyanov; Yuriy Stepanov
- Cinematography: Pyotr Dukhovskoy
- Edited by: Dmitri Dumkin
- Music by: Aleksey Aygi
- Production company: Studio Barmalei
- Release dates: 12 June 2008 (Kinotavr Sochi Open Russian Film Festival)
- Running time: 108 minutes
- Country: Russia
- Language: Russian

Wild Field (Russian: Дикое поле) is a 2008 Russian film directed by Mikheil Kalatozishvili from a well-known 1990s script by the late Pyotr Lutsik and Aleksey Samoryadov, and stars Oleg Dolin, Roman Madyanov, and Yuriy Stepanov.

== Plot ==
Idealistic and young Doctor Mitya (Oleg Dolin) goes to work in a remote steppe region of Kazakhstan. He brings a modicum of civilization to a barbaric world mired in alcoholism and violence. The physician expects his fiancée to join him there. At last, she arrives, only to let him know that she had met another man whom she wants to marry. An existential crisis ensues. The most sympathetic character in the village brutally stabs the doctor in the stomach.

== Cast ==
- Oleg Dolin as Mitya
- Roman Madyanov as Ryabov
- Yuriy Stepanov as Fyodor Abramovich
- Alexander Adol'fovich Ilyin as Alexander Ivanovich
- Aleksandr Ilyin, Jr. as Petro
- Daniela Stoyanovich as Katya
- Irina Butanayeva as Galina
- Ilya Sherbinin as Panko
- Aleksandr Korshunov as Man with cow
- Pyotr Stupin as Philip I.
- Volodymyr Yavorsky as Shepherd Stepan
- Igor Yavorsky as Shepherd Nikolay Smagin
- Juris Lautsinsh as "Angel"

== Reception ==
Despite the film's slow pacing, Wild Field was widely praised by Russian critics for its cinematography and exploration of existentialist angst. The film won multiple Nika Awards including the "Best Screenplay" (Lutsik and Samoryadov), "Best Actor" (Oleg Dolin) and "Best Music" (Aleksei Aigi) categories. It also won the "Best Feature Film" Golden Eagle Award. At the 65th Venice International Film Festival the film won the Art Cinema Award.
