= Alexander Veledinsky =

Russian film director (born 1959)

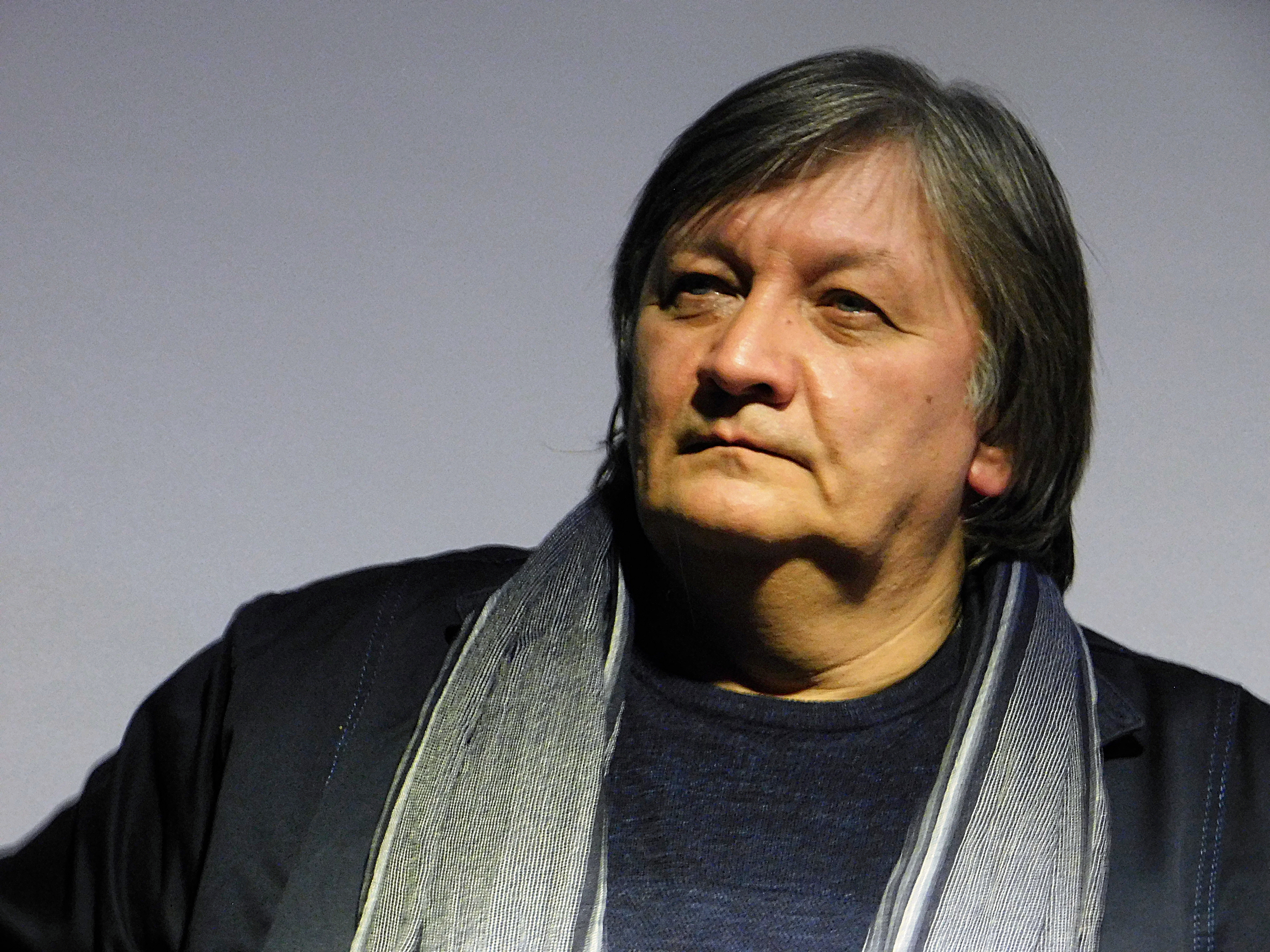
- Born: Alexander Alexeevich Veledinsky; 27 July 1959 (age 67)
- Occupations: Film director; screenwriter
- Notable work: The Geographer Drank His Globe Away

Alexander Alexeevich Veledinsky (Александр Алексеевич Велединский, born 27 July 1959 in Gorky) is a Russian film director and screenwriter. He directed several films, notably The Geographer Drank His Globe Away (2013). The film won five Nika Awards (including the best film), five prizes at Kinotavr festival, and many other awards.
