= Aleksei Alekseivich German =

Russian film director (born 1976)

Aleksei Alekseivich German Jr.
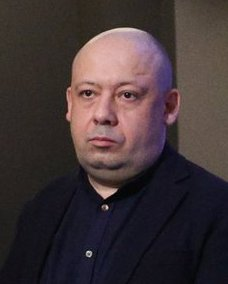
- Aleksei German, 2024
- Born: 4 September 1976 (age 49); Moscow
- Occupation: film director

Aleksei Alekseivich German Jr. (Russian: Алексей Алексеевич Герман, born 4 September 1976) is a Russian film director. His last name is pronounced with a hard "g" and in English is sometimes spelled Guerman or Gherman to avoid confusion.

== Biography ==
Aleksei German is a son of Russian film director Aleksei Yuryevich German (hence in Russia he is often called "Aleksei German Junior") and screenwriter Svetlana Igorevna Karmalita, and a grandson of writer Yuri German. He finished Gerasimov Institute of Cinematography in 2001 and worked on Lenfilm film studio.

His feature film debut The Last Train (2003) won the Best Picture and International Film Critics' Awards at Thessaloniki.

For his film Paper Soldier (2008), German received the Silver Lion Award at the Venice Film Festival.

His sixth film, Under Electric Clouds (2015), was screened in the main competition section of the 65th Berlin International Film Festival. and earned him the award for Achievement in Directing at the Asia Pacific Screen Awards in 2015.

== Personal life ==
German married production and costume designer Elena Okopnaya in 2011.

== Filmography ==
- The Last Train / Poslednij Poezd (2003) — Nika Award in nomination "Discovery of the Year"
- Garpastum (2005) — Nika Award in nomination "Best Director", nominated for Golden Lion of the 62nd Venice International Film Festival
- Paper Soldier / Bumazhnyj Soldat (2008) — Nika Award in nomination "Best Director", Silver Lion of the 65th Venice International Film Festival in nomination "Best Director" and "Golden Osella" for Best Cinematography
- Crush / Korotkoe zamykanie, part "Kim" (2009)
- From the Tokyo / Iz Tokyo (2011, short film)
- Under Electric Clouds / Pod electricheskimi oblakami (2015)
- Dovlatov (2018)
- House Arrest (2021)
- Air (2024)
