= Nika Award for Best Director =

Russian film award

- Country: Russia
- Presented by: Russian Academy of Cinema Arts and Science
- First award: 1988
- Currently held by: Andrei Konchalovsky for Dear Comrades! (2021)
- Website: Official site of the Russian Academy of Cinema Arts and Science

The Nika Award for Best Director (Russian: Ника за лучшую режиссёрскую работу) is given annually by the Russian Academy of Cinema Arts and Science and presented at the Nika Awards.

In 2022, nominees were announced, but the Award ceremony was postponed and, eventually, cancelled.

The Award ceremony was also cancelled in 2023.

In the following lists, the titles and names in bold with a light blue background are the winners and recipients respectively; those not in bold are the nominees. The year in light pink is when nominees were announced, but the Award ceremony was not held.

== Winners and nominees ==
=== 1980s ===
Year	Director(s)	International title	Original title	Transliterated title (per BGN/PCGN standard)	Ref(s)
1988	Tengiz Abuladze	Repentance	Покаяние	Pokayaniye	
1988	Kira Muratova	The Long Farewell	Долгие проводы	Dolgie provody	
1988	Alexander Sokurov	The Lonely Voice of Man	Одинокий голос человека	Odinokiy golos cheloveka	
1989	Andrei Konchalovsky	The Story of Asya Klyachina	История Аси Клячиной, которая любила, да не вышла замуж	Istoriya Asi Klyachinoy, kotoraya lyubila, da ne vyshla zamuzh	
1989	Aleksandr Askoldov	Commissar	Комиссар	Komissar	
1989	Vasili Pichul	Little Vera	Маленькая Вера	Malenkaya Vera	

=== 1990s ===
Year	Director(s)	International title	Original title	Transliterated title (per BGN/PCGN standard)	Ref(s)
1990	Dodo Abashidze, Sergei Parajanov	Ashik Kerib	აშიკ-ქერიბი	Strange Ashik	
1990	Vadim Abdrashitov	The Servant	Слуга	Sluga	
1990	Marina Goldovskaya	Solovky Power	Власть Соловецкая	Vlast Solovetskaya	
1991	Stanislav Govorukhin	You Can't Live Like That	Так жить нельзя	Tak zhit nelzya	
1991	Kira Muratova	The Asthenic Syndrome	Астенический синдром	Astenicheskiy sindrom	
1991	Vitali Kanevsky	Freeze Die Come to Life	Замри, умри, воскресни!	Zamri, umri, voskresni!	
1992	Eldar Ryazanov	Promised Heaven	Небеса обетованные	Nebesa obetovannye	
1992	Vyacheslav Krishtofovich	Adam's Rib	Ребро Адама	Rebro Adama	
1992	Karen Gevorkian	Spotted Dog Running at the Edge of the Sea	Пегий пёс, бегущий краем моря	Pegiy pyos, Begushchiy kraem morya	
1993	Nikita Mikhalkov	Close to Eden	Урга — территория любви	Urga – territoriya lyobvi	
1993	Temur Babluani	The Sun of the Sleepless	Солнце неспящих	Solntse nespyachshikh	
1993	Ivan Dykhovichny	Moscow Parade	Прорва	Prorva	
1994	Vladimir Khotinenko	Makarov	Макаров	Makarov	
1994	Yuri Mamin	Window to Paris	Окно в Париж	Okno v Parizh	
1994	Tamás Tóth	Children of Iron Gods	Дети чугунных богов	Deti chugunnykh bogov	
1995	Kira Muratova	Passions	Увлеченья	Uvlechenya	
1995	Valery Todorovsky	Katya Ismailova	Подмосковные вечера	Podmoskovnye vechera	
1995	Denis Evstigneev	Limita	Лимита	Limita	
1996	Aleksandr Rogozhkin	Peculiarities of the National Hunt	Особенности национальной охоты	Osobennosti natsionalnoy okhoty	
1996	Vadim Abdrashitov	A Play for a Passenger	Пьеса для пассажира	Pyesa dlya passazhira	
1996	Aleksey Sakharov	The Aristocratic Peasant Girl	Барышня-крестьянка	Baryshnya-krestyanka	
1996	Vladimir Khotinenko	A Moslem	Мусульманин	Musulmanin	
1997	Sergei Bodrov	Prisoner of the Mountains	Кавказский пленник	Kavkazskiy plennik	
1997	Aleksei Balabanov	The Arrival of a Train	Прибытие поезда	Pribytie poezda	
1997	Dmitry Meskhiev	The Arrival of a Train	Прибытие поезда	Pribytie poezda	
1998	Pavel Chukhray	The Thief	Вор	Vor	
1998	Vadim Abdrashitov	Time of a Dancer	Время танцора	Vremya tantsora	
1998	Lidia Bobrova	In That Land...	В той стране	V toy strane	
1999	Aleksei Balabanov	Of Freaks and Men	Про уродов и людей	Pro urodov i lyudey	
1999	Otar Iosseliani	Brigands	Разбойники. Глава VII	Razboyniki. Glava VII	
1999	Valery Todorovsky	Country of the Deaf	Страна глухих	Strana glukhikh	
1999	Karen Shakhnazarov	Day of the Full Moon	День полнолуния	Den polnoluniya	
1999	Aleksey Sakharov	Na boykom meste	На бойком месте	Na boykom meste	

=== 2000s ===
Year	Director(s)	International title	Original title	Transliterated title (per BGN/PCGN standard)	Ref(s)
2000	Aleksei German	Khrustalyov, My Car!	Хрусталёв, машину!	Khrustalyov, mashinu!	
2000	Valeriy Ogorodnikov	The Barracks	Барак	Barak	
2000	Valeriy Priyomykhov	Who If Not Us	Кто, если не мы	Kto, esli ne my	
2001	Bakhtyar Khudojnazarov	Luna Papa	Лунный папа	Lunnyy papa	
2001	Alexei Uchitel	His Wife's Diary	Дневник его жены	Dnevnik ego zheny	
2001	Sergei Solovyov	Tender Age	Нежный возраст	Nezhniy vozrast	
2002	Alexander Sokurov	Taurus	Телец	Telets	
2002	Leonid Maryagin	101st Kilometer	101-й километр	101-y kilometr	
2002	Alexander Mitta	The Border. Taiga Romance	Граница. Таёжный роман	Granitsa. Taoezhnyy roman	
2002	Dmitry Meskhiev	Mechanical Suite	Механическая сюита	Mekhanicheskaya syuita	
2002	Denis Evstigneev	Let's Make Love	Займёмся любовью	Zaymyomsya lyubovyu	
2003	Aleksandr Rogozhkin	The Cuckoo	Кукушка	Kukushka	
2003	Aleksei Balabanov	Wat	Война	Voyba	
2003	Valery Todorovsky	The Lover	Любовник	Lyubovnik	
2004	Vadim Abdrashitov	Magnetic Storms	Магнитные бури	Magnitnye buri	
2004	Andrey Zvyagintsev	The Return	Возвращение	Vozvrashcheniye	
2004	Peter Buslov	Bimmer	Бумер	Bumer	
2004	Gennady Sidorov	Old Women	Старухи	Starukhi	
2005	Kira Muratova	The Tuner	Настройщик	Nastroyshchik	
2005	Pavel Chukhray	A Driver for Vera	Водитель для Веры	Voditel dlya Very	
2005	Dmitry Meskhiev	Our Own	Свои	Svoi	
2006	Aleksei German Jr.	Garpastum	Гарпастум	Garpastum	
2006	Fyodor Bondarchuk	The 9th Company	9 рота	9 rota	
2006	Andrei Kravchuk	The Italian	Итальянец	Italyanets	
2007	Pavel Lungin	The Island	Остров	Ostrov	
2007	Boris Khlebnikov	Free Floating	Свободное плавание	Svobodnoe plavanie	
2007	Alexander Veledinsky	Alive	Живой	Zhivoy	
2008	Sergei Bodrov	Mongol	Монгол	Mongol	
2008	Aleksei Balabanov	Cargo 200	Груз 200	Gruz 200	
2008	Alexei Popogrebski	Simple Things	Простые вещи	Prosty'e veshchi	
2009	Aleksei German Jr.	Paper Soldier	Бумажный солдат	Bumazhnyy soldat	
2009	Mikheil Kalatozishvili	Wild Field	Дикое поле	Dikoe pole	
2009	Valery Todorovsky	Hipsters	Стиляги	Stilyagi	

=== 2010s ===
Year	Director(s)	International title	Original title	Transliterated title (per BGN/PCGN standard)	Ref(s)
2010	Andrei Khrzhanovsky	Room and a Half	Полторы комнаты, или сентиментальное путешествие на родину	Poltory komnaty, ili sentimentalnoe puteshestvie na rodinu	
2010	Nikolai Dostal	Pete on the Way to Heaven	Петя по дороге в Царствие Небесное	Petia po doroge v tsarstvie nebesnoye	
2010	Karen Shakhnazarov	Ward No. 6	Палата № 6	Palata № 6	
2010	Aleksey Mizgiryov	Tambourine, Drum	Бубен, барабан	Buben, baraban	
2011	Alexei Popogrebski	How I Ended This Summer	Как я провёл этим летом	Kak ya provyol etim letom	
2011	Aleksei Balabanov	A Stoker	Кочегар	Kochegar	
2011	Alexander Kott	Fortress of War	Брестская крепость	Brestskaia krepost	
2011	Alexei Uchitel	The Edge	Край	Kray	
2012	Andrey Zvyagintsev	Elena	Елена	Elena	
2012	Andrei Smirnov	Once Upon a Time There Lived a Simple Woman	Жила-была одна баба	Zhila-byla odna baba	
2012	Sergey Loban	Chapiteau-show	Шапито-шоу	Shapito-shou	
2013	Alexander Sokurov	Faust	Фауст	Faust	
2013	Aleksei Balabanov	Me Too	Я тоже хочу	Ya tozhe khochu	
2013	Andrei Proshkin	The Horde	Орда	Orda	
2014	Alexander Veledinsky	The Geographer Drank His Globe Away	Географ глобус пропил	Geograf Globus Propil	
2014	Fyodor Bondarchuk	Stalingrad	Сталинград	Stalingrad	
2014	Yuri Bykov	The Major	Майор	Mayor	
2014	Boris Khlebnikov	A Long and Happy Life	Долгая счастливая жизнь	Dolgaya chastlivaya zhizn	
2015	Aleksei German	Hard to Be a God	Трудно быть богом	Trudno byt' bogom	
2015	Andrey Zvyagintsev	Leviathan	Левиафан	Leviafan	
2015	Andrei Konchalovsky	The Postman's White Nights	Белые ночи почтальона Алексея Тряпицына	Belye nochi pochtalona Alekseya Tryapitsyna	
2016	Stanislav Govorukhin	The End of Beautiful Era	Конец прекрасной эпохи	Konets prekrasnoy epokhi	
2016	Aleksei German Jr.	Under Electric Clouds	Под электрическими облаками	Pod electricheskimi oblakami	
2016	Anna Melikian	About Love	Про любовь	Pro lyubov	
2016	Vasily Sigarev	The Land of Oz	Страна ОЗ	Strana OZ	
2017	Andrei Konchalovsky	Paradise	Рай	Ray	
2017	Nikolay Dostal	The Monk and the Demon	Монах и бес	Monakh i bes	
2017	Kirill Serebrennikov	The Student	Ученик	Uchenik	
2018	Boris Khlebnikov	Arrhythmia	Аритмия	Aritmiya	
2018	Kantemir Balagov	Closeness	Теснота	Tesnota	
2018	Andrey Zvyagintsev	Loveless	Нелюбовь	Nelyubov	
2019	Kirill Serebrennikov	Leto	Лето	Leto	
2019	Aleksei German Jr.	Dovlatov	Довлатов	Dovlatov	
2019	Natalya Merkulova, Aleksey Chupov	The Man Who Surprised Everyone	Человек, который удивил всех	Chelovek, kotoryj udivil vsekh	
2019	Aleksey Fedorchenko	Anna's War	Война Анны	Voyna Anny	

=== 2020s ===
Year	Director(s)	International title	Original title	Transliterated title (per BGN/PCGN standard)	Ref(s)
2020	Andrei Smirnov	A Frenchman	Француз	Frantsuz	
2020	Kantemir Balagov	Beanpole	Дылда	Dylda	
2020	Sergey Dvortsevoy	Ayka	Айка	Ayka	
2021	Andrei Konchalovsky	Dear Comrades!	Дорогие товарищи!	Dorogie tomarishchi!	
2021	Dmitry Davydov	Scarecrow	Пугало	Pugalo	
2021	Andrey Zaytsev	A Siege Diary	Блокадный дневник	Blokadnyy dnevnik	
2022	Alexander Zeldovich	Medea	Медея	Medeya	
2022	Kira Kovalenko	Unclenching the Fists	Разжимая кулаки	Razzhimaya kulaki	
2022	Natalya Merkulova, Aleksey Chupov	Captain Volkonogov Escaped	Капитан Волконогов бежал	Kapitan Volkonogov bezhal	
2022	Vadim Perelman	Persian Lessons	Уроки фарси	Uroki farsi	

== Multiple wins and nominations ==
=== Multiple wins ===
Wins	Director
3	Andrei Konchalovsky
2	Aleksandr Rogozhkin
2	Kira Muratova
2	Sergei Bodrov
2	Aleksei German Jr.
2	Alexander Sokurov
2	Aleksei German
2	Stanislav Govorukhin

=== Four or more nominations ===
Nominations	Director
6	Aleksei Balabanov
4	Kira Muratova
4	Vadim Abdrashitov
4	Valery Todorovsky
4	Andrey Zvyagintsev
4	Aleksei German Jr.
4	Andrei Konchalovsky
