= Chulpan Khamatova =

Russian actress (born 1975)

- Чулпан Хаматова
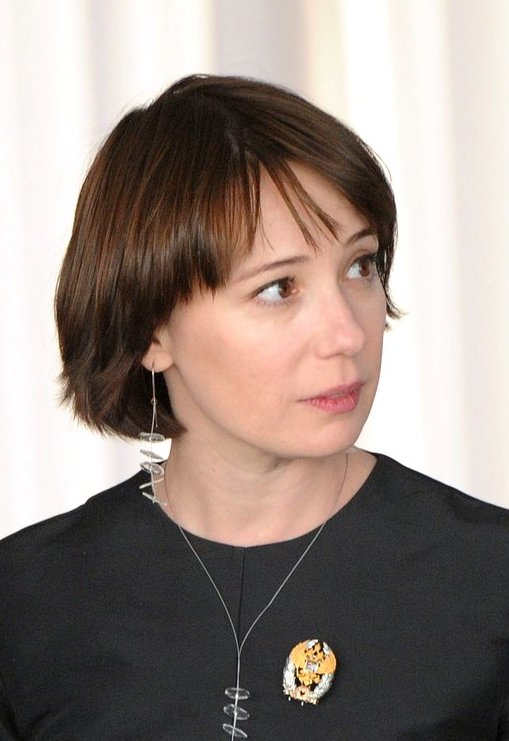
- Khamatova in 2015
- Born: Chulpan Nailevna Khamatova; 1 October 1975 (age 51); Kazan, Tatar ASSR, Russian SFSR, Soviet Union (now Kazan, Tatarstan, Russia)
- Education: Russian Institute of Theatre Arts
- Occupations: Actress; philanthropist; television personality
- Years active: 1998–present
- Title: People's Artist of Russia (2012)
- Spouses: Ivan Volkov (m. 1995; div. 2002); Aleksandr Shein (m. 2009; div. 2017)
- Children: 3

Signature
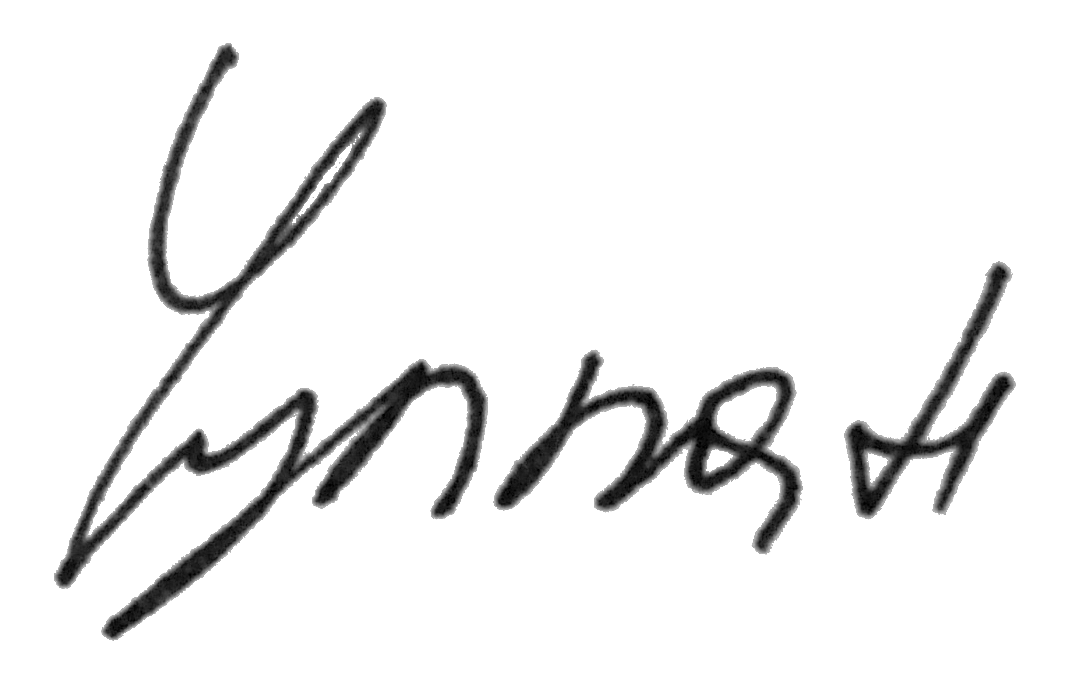

Chulpan Nailevna Khamatova (Russian: Чулпан Наилевна Хаматова; Tatar: Чулпан Наил кызы Хаматова, romanized: Çulpan Nail qızı Xamatowa; Latvian: Čulpana Hamatova, born 1 October 1975) is a Russian actress.

== Biography ==
=== Early life and theater career ===
Chulpan Nailevna Khamatova was born on 1 October 1975 in Kazan, Tatar ASSR, in what was then the Soviet Union. Her parents Marina Galimullovna Khamatova and Nail Khamatov are both engineers. Her name, Chulpan, means "morning star" (i.e. Venus) in Tatar (she is of Volga Tatar origin). Her younger brother Shamil Khamatov is also an actor.

As a child, she was engaged in figure skating and from the eighth grade studied at the mathematical school of the Kazan Federal University. She was accepted at the Kazan State Finance and Economics Institute but ended up changing her mind and entered the Kazan Theater School. Teachers Juno Kareva and Vadim Keshner, assessing the prospects of the beginning actress, advised and helped Khamatova continue her studies in Moscow, and she entered Russian Institute of Theatre Arts, the course of Alexei Borodin.

Khamatova performed on the stages of several Moscow theaters: Russian Academic Youth Theater (Dunya Raskolnikova in Crime and Punishment and Anne Frank in Anne Frank's Diary), the Theater of the Moon, the Anton Chekhov Theater (Katya in Pose of the Immigrant), the Open Theater Julia Malakyants (Silvia).

In 1998 she was invited to the troupe of the Moscow Sovremennik Theatre. She debuted in the role of Patricia Holman (Three Comrades by Erich Maria Remarque). She also received roles in the plays Three Sisters (Irina), Mamapapasynsobaka (Andria), The Storm (Katerina), The Naked Pioneer (Masha Mukhina) and Anthony and Cleopatra (Cleopatra), as well as the role of Masha in the new version of the play Three Sisters. In 2008, Khamatova took part in the performance of the Theatre of Nations Stories of Shukshin (directed by Alvis Hermanis), where she played nine of 10 stories.

=== Film career ===
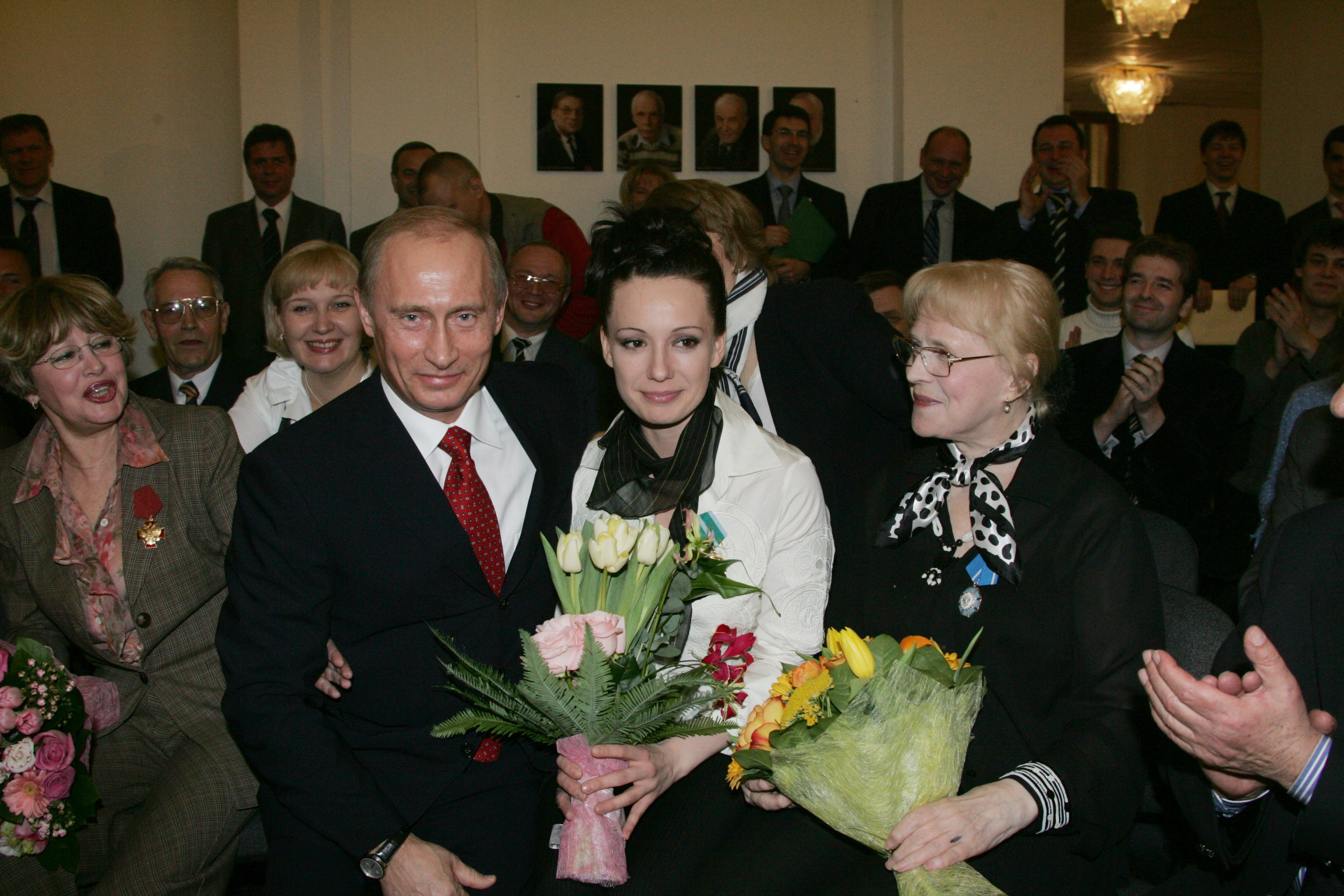
Khamatova with Russian President Vladimir Putin on 14 April 2006

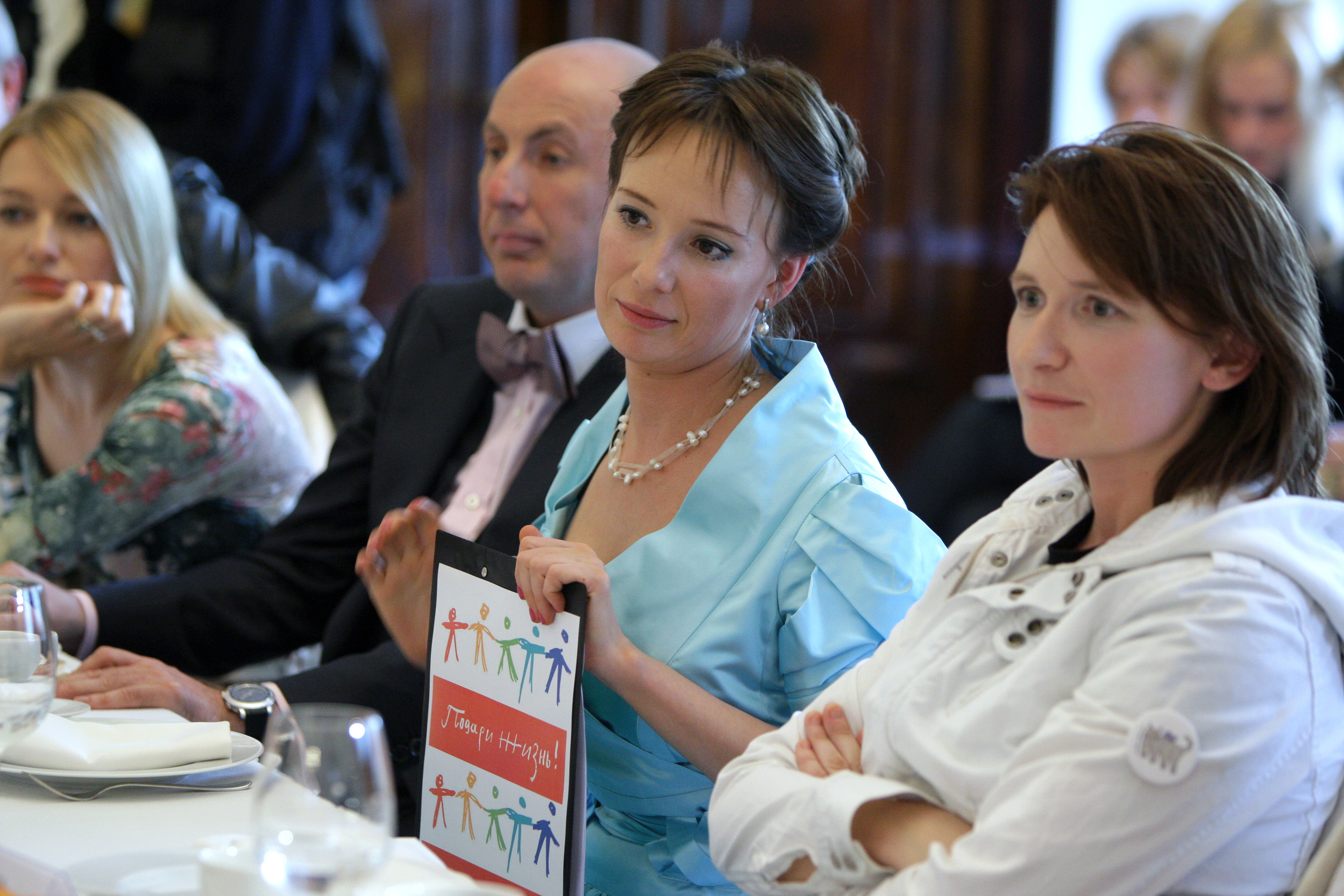
Khamatova in Saint Petersburg on 29 May 2010

Khamatova has starred in a number of German-language films, and she is considered to be a leading Russian actress.

In cinema, Khamatova started acting during the third year of GITIS – Vadim Abdrashitov invited her for the role of Katya in the film Time of a Dancer (1997). Khamatova's breakthrough came with the crime drama Country of the Deaf (1998) by Valery Todorovsky where she played Rita. The picture was about deaf-mute people and Khamatova had to learn sign language for the role.

Other notable films with Khamatova's participation include Bakhtyar Khudojnazarov's picture Luna Papa (1999), 72 Meters (2004) and The Fall of the Empire (2005) by Vladimir Khotinenko, Children of the Arbat (2004) by Andrei Eshpai and Garpastum (2005) by Aleksei German Jr.

She is best known internationally for starring in Good Bye, Lenin! (2003), as Lara, the girlfriend of the main character and his mother's nurse.

She was on the six-person jury, which was headed by Catherine Deneuve, at the 63rd Venice International Film Festival in 2006.

In 2007, together with professional ice dancer Roman Kostomarov, she took part and became the winner of the Channel One figure skating competition Ice Age.

=== Personal life ===
Khamatova was married to the actor and composer Ivan Volkov from 1995 to 2002. In 2003, she was in a relationship with the ballet dancer Aleksei Dubinin (Russian: Алексей Дубинин). On 1 October 2009, she married the actor and director Aleksandr Shein. She has three daughters: Arina Ivanovna Volkova (born 4 April 2002), Asya Alekseievna Dubinina (born 2003) and Iya Aleksandrovna Shein (born 27 April 2010). Her marriage to Shein ended in 2017.

=== Philanthropy and politics ===
Khamatova is known for her social activities, she draws public attention to the problems of children with cancer. In 2005, she and Dina Korzun organized the concert "Give me life" at the stage of Sovremennik Theatre to help children with hematological diseases. In 2006, Khamatova became a co-founder of the Podari Zhizn ("Make the gift of Life") charity foundation which helps children suffering from oncological and hematological diseases. By the summer of 2009, the fund had collected and sent for treatment of these diseases more than 500 million rubles. One of the permanent sponsors of the fund is Armen Sargsyan

In 2012, Khamatova publicly supported Russian president Vladimir Putin during the presidential election campaign. According to Russian journalists, Khamatova was put under pressure to save her charity foundation. In 2019, Khamatova said that she would never have done that if she could imagine that he would start the war in Donbas. On another occasion, she said that she is actually apolitical, but the charity in Russia is heavily dependant on the support from the state.

In February 2022, Khamatova was one of signatories of the petition started by Mikhail Zygar to protest the Russian invasion of Ukraine. On holiday when the war started, she accepted that she needed to stay in exile in Latvia, realising that she could not return to Russia without being forced to deny the war or apologize for not supporting it. She stated that after she signed the petition, "it was made clear to me it would be undesirable for me to go back," adding "I know I am not a traitor. I love my motherland very much." In April 2022, she publicly spoke at an anti-war rally in the Latvian capital Riga.

== Acting credits ==
=== Film and television ===
- Country of the Deaf (1998)
- Time of a Dancer (1998)
- Luna Papa (1999)
- Tuvalu (1999)
- The Christmas Miracle (2000)
- England! (2000)
- Lion's Share (2001)
- Viktor Vogel - Commercial Man (2001)
- Good Bye, Lenin! (2003)
- Tamer of Chickens (2003)
- Hurensohn (2004)
- 72 Meters (2004)
- Children of the Arbat (serial) (2004)
- Garpastum (2005)
- Greek Holidays (2005)
- The Fall of the Empire (2005)
- The Kukotsky Enigma (2005) serial
- Ellipsis (2006)
- Mechenosets (2006)
- Doctor Zhivago (2006 miniseries)
- Midsummer Madness (2007)
- América (2010)
- Tower (2010)
- House of the Sun (2010)
- Dostoevskiy (2011) (serial)
- Katya (2011) (short film)
- From Tokyo (2011) (short film)
- Garegin Nzhdeh (2013)
- Studio 17 (2013)
- The Syndrom of Petrushka (2015)
- Under Electric Clouds (2015)
- The White Crow (2018)
- The Bra (2018)
- VMayakovsky (2019)
- Doctor Lisa (2020)
- Zuleikha Opens Her Eyes (TV series) (2020)
- Petrov's Flu (2021)
- Quiet Life (2024)
- Ulya (2026)

=== Theatre ===
- 1995 — Young Robinson Dreams, O. Mikhailov (Pyatnitsa)
- 1995 — Fanta-Infanta, S. Prokhanov (Fanta)
- 1996 — The pose of the emigrant, G. Slutski (Katya)
- 1997 — Celebration, B. Slend (Sanny)
- 1999 — Three Comrades, E. M. Remarque (Patricia Holman)
- 2000 — The Diary of Anne Frank, F. Goodrich, A. Hackett (Anne Frank)
- 2001 — Three Sisters, G. Volchek (Irina)
- 2003 — Mamapapasinsobaka (Mom & Dad & Son & Dog), B. Srblanovich (Andria)
- 2003 — Twelfth Night, Perchtoldsdofer Sommerspiele, Austria (Viola)
- 2004 — Thunderstorm, N. Chusova (Katerina)
- 2005 — Naked Pioneer Girl, M. Kononov (Mashsa)
- 2006 — Antony & Cleopatra. Version, O. Bogaev, K. Serebrennikov (Cleopatra)
- 2008 — Three Sisters (Masha)
- 2008 — Shukshin Stories, A. Hermanis (9 roles)
- 2009 — Poor Liza, A. Sigalova, N. Simonov (Liza)
- 2011 — Miss Julie, T. Ostermeier (Julie)
- 2011 — Enemies: A Love Story, E. Arie (Mashsa)
- 2012 — Slightly Out of Focus, E. Arie (Sarah)
- 2025 — Our Class, Tadeusz Słobodzianek, Arlekin Players, Boston (Rachelka/Mariana)

== Awards and honours ==
- 2001 – Award for best female role in the Viewers' View contest at the Kinotavar Film Festival (Lion's Share).
- 2002 – Award for best female role (Luna Papa) at the Brigantina Film Festival.
- 2002 – Viewer judgement panel award for best female role (Lunar Dad) at the Russian Sochi Film Festival.
- 2003 – Chayka Award in the Smile nomination for best comedic female role
- 2004 – Russian Federation national award for performances in Anne Frank's Diary, Three Comrades and Mamapapasynsobaka.
- 2004 – Awarded title of Honored Artist of the Russian Federation
- 2004 – Awarded the Golden Mask for role in Mamapapasynsobaka
- 2004 – Kumir Award
- 2006 – Coronation Award in the Brightest Star Category
- 2006 – TEFI Award in the Faces Category for best female role (Doctor Zhivago)
- 2006 – Golden Eagle Award for best female supporting role (Ellipsis)
- 2006 – Order of Friendship
- 2007 – George 2007 Award (in honor of George Melyes) from Russian Live Journal
- 2007 – Acknowledged by Glamour Magazine as Woman of the Year
- 2008 – Awarded a star on the Alley of Fame at the Russian Film Star Square
- 2009 – George 2007 Award (in honor of George Melyes) from Russian Live Journal
- 2009 – Living Theater Award for best female role in Shukshin's Tales
- 2010 – Person of the Year 2009 Award in the nomination for Proactive Civil Initiative
- 2010 – In the Right Track Award in honor of V. Visotsky for years of work in the name of saving lives and helping preserve health in children, for asceticism, for spiritual generosity and for faith in humanity
- 2012 – People's Artist of Russia for vast achievements in cinematography and theatrical arts
- 2012 – NIKA National Film Award for charitable work
- 2012 – Asteroid 279119 Khamatova, discovered by Russian amateur astronomer Timur Krjačko at the Zelenchukskaya Station in 2009, was named in her honor. The official naming citation was published by the Minor Planet Center on 28 December 2012 (M.P.C. 81935).
- 2015 – State Prize of the Russian Federation

== See also ==
- Cinema of Russia
- Cinema of Germany
- List of Tatars
