= Nika Award for Best Supporting Performance =

Russian film award

- Country: Russia
- Presented by: Russian Academy of Cinema Arts and Science
- First award: 1988
- Currently held by: Garmash for Tender Age (2001)
- Website: kino-nika.com

The Nika Award for Best Supporting Performance (Russian: Ника за лучшую роль второго плана) is given annually by the Russian Academy of Cinema Arts and Science and presented at the Nika Awards.

In the following lists, the titles and names in bold with a light blue background are the winners and recipients respectively; those not in bold are the nominees.

== Winners and nominees ==
=== 1980s ===
Year	Winner and nominees	International title	Original title	Transliterated title (per BGN/PCGN standard)	Ref(s)
1988	Irina Kupchenko	Other Life	Другая жизнь	Drugaya zhizn	
1988	Nikolai Rybnikov	The Second Attempt of Viktor Krokhin	Вторая попытка Виктора Крохина	Vtoraya popytka Viktora Krokhina	
1988	Stanislav Sadalsky	The Forest	Лес	Les	
1989	Rayisa Nedashkivska	Commissar	Комиссар	Komissar	
1989	Liya Akhedzhakova	The Sinner	Грешник	Freshnik	
1989	Zinovy Gerdt	Kings of Crime	Воры в законе	Vory v zakone	

=== 1990s ===
Year	Winner and nominees	International title	Original title	Transliterated title (per BGN/PCGN standard)	Ref(s)
1990	Nina Ruslanova	The Humble Cemetery	Смиренное кладбище	Smirennoe kladbishche	
1990	Larisa Malevannaya	Intergirl	Интердевочка	Interdevochka	
1990	Vyacheslav Tikhonov	To Kill a Dragon	Убить дракона	Ubit drakona	
1991	Svetlana Kryuchkova	It, SV - Spalnyy vagon, The Royal Hunt	Оно, СВ - Спальный вагон, Царская охота	Ono, SV - Spalnyy vagon, Tsarskaya okhota	
1991	Olga Antonova	The Asthenic Syndrome	Астенический синдром	Astenicheskiy sindrom	
1991	Valentin Gaft	The Feasts of Belshazzar, or a Night with Stalin	Пиры Валтасара, или Ночь со Сталиным	Piry Valtasara, ili noch so Stalinym	
1992	Liya Akhedzhakova	Promised Heaven	Небеса обетованные	Nebesa obetovannye	
1992	Aleksandr Abdulov	House Under the Starry Skies, Sons of Bitches	Дом под звёздным небом, Сукины дети	Dom pod zvyozdnym nebom, Sukiny deti	
1992	Nikita Mikhalkov	Humiliated and Insulted	Униженные и оскорблённые	Unizhennye i oskorblennye	
1993	Elena Yakovleva	Encore, Once More Encore!	Анкор, ещё анкор!	Ankor, escho ankor!	
1993	Valentina Malyavina	Autumn Temptations	Осенние соблазны	Osennie soblazny	
1993	Nina Usatova	To See Paris and Die, Chicha	Увидеть Париж и умереть, Чича	Uvidet Parizh i umeret, Chicha	
1994	Vladimir Ilyin	Makarov	Макаров	Makarov	
1994	Innokenty Smoktunovsky	The Killer	Убийца	Ubiytsa	
1994	Nina Usatova	Window to Paris	Окно в Париж	Okno v Parizh	
1995	Alisa Freindlich	Katya Ismailova	Подмосковные вечера	Podmoskovnye vechera	
1995	Olga Antonova	Nezabudki	Незабудки	Nezabudki	
1995	Georgy Vitsin	Khagi-tragger	Хагги-Траггер	Khagi-tragger	
1996	Aleksandr Baluev	A Moslem	Мусульманин	Musulmanin	
1996	Nikolai Burlyayev	What a Wonderful Game	Какая чудная игра	Kakaya chudnaya igra	
1996	Larisa Udovichenko	What a Wonderful Game	Какая чудная игра	Kakaya chudnaya igra	
1997	Mikhail Gluzsky	A Man for a Young Girl	Мужчина для молодой женщины	Muzhchina dlya molodoy zhenshchiny	
1997	Irina Kupchenko	Summer People	Летние люди	Letnie lyudi	
1997	Oleg Yankovsky	The Inspector	Ревизор	Revizor	
1998	Zurab Kipshidze	Time of a Dancer	Время танцора	Vremya tantsora	
1998	Vladimir Zeldin	Cops and Robbers	Полицейские и воры	Politseyskie i vory	
1998	Oleg Tabakov	Three Stories	Три истории	Tri istorii	
1999	Maksim Sukhanov	Country of the Deaf	Страна глухих	Strana glukhikh	
1999	Svetlana Kryuchkova	Totalitarian Romance	Тоталитарный роман	Totalitarnyy roman	
1999	Zinaida Sharko	Composition for Victory Day	Сочинение ко Дню Победы	Sochinenie ko Dnyu Pobedy	

=== 2000s ===
Year	Winner and nominees	International title	Original title	Transliterated title (per BGN/PCGN standard)	Ref(s)
2000	Leonid Yarmolnik	The Barracks	Барак	Barak	
2000	Sergei Garmash	Voroshilov Sharpshooter	Ворошиловский стрелок	Voroshilovskiy strelok	
2000	Sergei Nikonenko	Chinese Tea Set	Китайский сервиз	Kitayskiy serviz	
2001	Sergei Garmash	Tender Age	Нежный возраст	Nezhniy vozrast	
2001	Anastasiya Vertinskaya	The Bremen Town Musicians & Co	Бременские музыканты & Co	Bremenskie muzykanty & Co	
2001	Sergei Makovetsky	The Captain's Daughter	Русский бунт	Russkiy bunt	
