= Pyotr Zaychenko =

Soviet-born Russian film and theater actor

- Пётр Зайченко
- Born: Pyotr Petrovich Zaychenko; 1 April 1943; Kaysatskoye, Stalingrad Oblast, RSFSR, USSR
- Died: 21 March 2019 (aged 75); Volgograd, Russia
- Occupation: Actor
- Years active: 1971–2019

Pyotr Petrovich Zaychenko (Russian: Пётр Петрович Зайченко; 1 April 1943 – 21 March 2019) was a Soviet-born Russian film and theater actor.

== Career ==
Fame in cinema brought Zaychenko the role of Sgt. Ivan Pukhov in Vadim Abdrashitov's Planet Parade (1984). Later, the actor starred in two more films by this director: Plumbum, or The Dangerous Game and Armavir.

In 1990, Zaychenko played Ivan Shlykov in Pavel Lungin's Taxi Blues.

He was director of the Volgograd branch of the Union of Cinematographers of the Russian Federation.

== Selected filmography ==
- Planet Parade (1984) as Ivan Pukhov
- Attempted Electrification (1985) as Shcherbakov
- Plumbum, or The Dangerous Game (1987) as druzhinnik
- Taxi Blues (1990) as Shlykov
- The Tale of the Outstanding Moon (1990) as Vasily Vasilievich
- Armavir (1991) as Arthur
- Lost in Siberia (1991) as investigator
- Stalin's Testament (1993) as general, presidential candidate
- Krapachuk (1993) as Chelorek
- Concerto for Fats (1995) as Pronin
- Crusader (1995) as drug trafficker Tosha
- A Moslem (1995) as Pavel Petrovich
- The Circus Burned Down, and the Clowns Have Gone (1998) as Igor, businessman
- Wolfhound (2006) as Fitela
- Free Floating (2006) as Elderly man from brigade
- Last Slaughter (2007) as Anatoly
- Taras Bulba (2008) as Metelitsa
- I Am (2009) as Chernobyl survivor
- Home (2011) as Alexey Shamanov
- Siberia, Monamour (2011) as grandfather Ivan
- Leningrad 46 (2014) as the old man near the temple
- Sophia (2016) as Philip I, metropolitan of Moscow and All Russia

== Awards ==
- Medal "For Labour Valour" (1986)
- Merited Artist of the Russian Federation (1998)
- Order of Friendship (2014)
