= Me Too (2012 film) =

- Directed by: Aleksei Balabanov
- Screenplay by: Aleksei Balabanov
- Starring: Aleksandre Mossine
- Cinematography: Valeri Petrov; Andreï Valentsov
- Edited by: Tatiana Kouzmitcheva
- Music by: Leonid Fiodorov
- Release date: 2012
- Language: Russian

Me Too (Russian: Я тоже хочу, romanized: Ya tozhe khochu) is a 2012 Russian drama film written and directed by Aleksei Balabanov. It premiered in the Orizzonti competition at the 69th Venice International Film Festival. For this film Balabanov received a Nika Award nomination for Best Director and the Best Director Award at the Saint Petersburg International Film Festival. The film has been described as 'a cheeky, darkly humorous response to Stalker by Andrei Tarkovsky'.

== Plot ==
A diverse group of marginalized Russians makes a journey to the "zone", a region clothed in forever snow, to reach a mystical, Chernobyl-like "bell-tower of happiness" that is said to take the chosen directly to heaven. This pilgrimage is led by "Sanya the Bandit," who sets off in a large black SUV with a musician, a prostitute, an alcoholic, and the alcoholic's elderly father. Along the way, they pick up others, all of whom cry out, "Me too!" in the desperate hope of escaping their miserable lives. Upon reaching the abandoned, apparently radioactive zone, the group encounters frozen bodies and a film director (played by Balabanov himself). Ultimately, some are miraculously "beamed up" to paradise while others suddenly die, yet nobody knows how the chosen are, in fact, chosen. In a stark conclusion, even the director is denied entry to the promised paradise.

== Cast ==
- Aleksandre Mossine as Bandit
- Oleg Garkoucha as Musician
- Yuri Matveyev as Matveï
- Alissa Chitikova as Young Woman
- Viktor Gorbunov as Matveï's Father
- Aleksei Balabanov as Director
- Pyotr Balabanov as Boy
- Dunya Smirnova as Guide
- Sergey Sholokhov as Guide
