= Speech for the Defence =

- Russian: Слово для защиты
- Directed by: Vadim Abdrashitov
- Written by: Aleksandr Mindadze
- Starring: Galina Yatskina; Marina Neyolova; Oleg Yankovskiy; Stanislav Lyubshin; Viktor Shulgin
- Cinematography: Anatoliy Zabolotskiy
- Music by: Vladimir Martynov
- Production company: Mosfilm
- Release date: 1976
- Running time: 98 minutes
- Country: Soviet Union
- Language: Russian

Speech for the Defence (Russian: Слово для защиты) is a 1976 Soviet legal drama film directed by Vadim Abdrashitov.

The film tells the story about a woman named Valentina Kostina, who is accused of attempted murder of her lover and pleads guilty.

== Plot ==
Valentina Kostina is accused of attempting to murder her lover, Fedyaev. While she confesses to the crime, her lawyer, Irina Mezhnikova, seeks to uncover extenuating circumstances that might justify her actions. As Irina delves deeper into Valentina’s tragic story, she discovers that Valentina had supported her lover financially, depriving herself of everything, and loved him with unwavering devotion. However, Fedyaev repaid her with callous ingratitude. Heartbroken and betrayed, Valentina decided to end both her life and his, but both survived. Now, she faces the prospect of imprisonment.

Irina comes to understand that Valentina is a victim of circumstance and that Fedyaev is the true culprit in this tragedy. She attempts to convince Valentina that Fedyaev is an unworthy, insignificant man who never deserved her sacrifice. Despite Irina's efforts, Valentina remains unconvinced. However, Irina’s passionate courtroom plea ultimately secures Valentina's freedom. Although acquitted, Valentina finds no joy in her release. Meanwhile, Irina realizes that, in contrast to Valentina’s profound and selfless love, her own feelings for her fiancé, Ruslan, are superficial and insincere.

== Cast ==
- Galina Yatskina as Irina Mezhnikova
- Marina Neyolova as Valentina Kostina
- Oleg Yankovskiy as Ruslan
- Stanislav Lyubshin as Fedyayev
- Viktor Shulgin as Mezhnikov
- Aleksey Alekseev as Judge
- Valentina Berezutskaya as Kuznetsova
- Anatoliy Grachyov
- Eduard Izotov as Arkadii Stepanovich
- Elena Kebal as Svetlana
