= The Turning Point (1978 film) =

- Russian: Поворот
- Directed by: Vadim Abdrashitov
- Written by: Aleksandr Mindadze
- Starring: Oleg Yankovsky; Irina Kupchenko; Anatoliy Solonitsyn; Lyubov Strizhenova; Oleg Anofriev
- Cinematography: Elizbar Karavayev
- Edited by: Polina Skachkova
- Music by: Vladimir Martynov
- Release date: 1978
- Country: Soviet Union
- Language: Russian

The Turning Point (Russian: Поворот) is a 1978 Soviet psychological drama film directed by Vadim Abdrashitov.

== Plot ==
Victor and Natasha are newlyweds who have just finished their honeymoon cruise on the Black Sea. Driving back to Moscow to their work and family life, Victor hits an elderly lady. She dies in the hospital. He is accused of causing the accident while driving too fast and a trial, and possible prison time, looms.

== Cast ==
- Oleg Yankovsky as Viktor Vedeneyev
- Irina Kupchenko as Natasha Vedeneyeva
- Anatoliy Solonitsyn as Kostantin Korolyev
- Lyubov Strizhenova as Zina
- Oleg Anofriev
- Natalya Velichko
- Mikhail Dadyko as Andrey Vasilyevich, professor
- Olimpiada Kalmykova
- Aleksandr Kaydanovsky
- Natalya Malyavina as Albina
