= The Prince and the Pauper (1972 film) =

- Russian: Принц и нищий
- Directed by: Vadim Gauzner
- Written by: Aleksei Yakovlev
- Based on: The Prince and the Pauper by Mark Twain
- Starring: Ivan Krasko; Maya Bulgakova; Marina Neyolova; Anatoly Solonitsyn
- Cinematography: Oleg Kukhovarenko
- Music by: Oleg Karavaychuk
- Release date: 1972
- Country: Soviet Union
- Language: Russian

The Prince and the Pauper (Russian: Принц и нищий) is a 1972 Soviet children's adventure film directed by Vadim Gauzner.

The young thief Tom wants to thank the man who paid the ransom for him to the bandits and for this goes to the palace. On the way, he meets Prince Edward, who looks just like him, and they decide to swap roles.

== Plot ==
Humphrey, the servant of Prince Edward, saves a poor boy named Tom Canty from a beating by his father for a single farthing. Grateful, Tom decides to visit the royal palace later that day to find his rescuer and repay the debt.

Through the chimney, Tom ends up in the chambers of Prince Edward. The prince is astonished by their striking resemblance. They exchange clothes, and the prince ventures into the slums of London to witness firsthand how his subjects live.

Both boys experience remarkable adventures. That same day, the reigning king dies, and the prince, dressed in rags, struggles to return to the palace now torn by discord. Only the Great Royal Seal, which he had hidden before leaving, convinces the doubtful courtiers that he truly is the prince and not a common beggar.

== Cast ==
- Viktor Smirnov as Edward VI/Tom Canty
- Yuri Astafyev as Hemphrey
- Ivan Krasko as Miles Hendon
- Maya Bulgakova as Jenny, Tom's mother
- Aleksandr Sokolov as John Canty, Tom's father
- Marina Neyolova as Elizabeth I
- Anatoly Solonitsyn as Lord Saint John
- Gennadi Poloka as Edward Seymour
- Rolan Bykov as Sir William, master of ceremonies
- Oleg Borisov as Hugo
