= Luna Park (1992 film) =

- Directed by: Pavel Lungin
- Written by: Pavel Lungin
- Produced by: Georges Benayoun; Angelo Pastore; Paul Rosenberg
- Starring: Oleg Borisov; Andrei Gutin; Natalya Yegorova
- Cinematography: Denis Yevstigneyev
- Edited by: Elisabeth Guido
- Music by: Isaak Schwarz
- Production companies: Blyuz Film Studio; Ciby 2000
- Distributed by: Northern Arts Entertainment (USA); Union Générale Cinématographique (UGC) - Theatrical
- Release date: 9 September 1992
- Running time: 111 minutes
- Countries: France; Russia
- Language: Russian

Luna Park (Russian: Луна-парк; 1992) is a Franco-Russian produced film. The second feature film of Russian director Pavel Lungin, it depicts the story of a young antisemitic skinhead leader, Andrei Leonov (Andrei Gutin), who is forced to come to terms with the discovery that his father, Naoum Kheifitz (Oleg Borisov), is of Jewish ancestry.

The film, of the "chernukha" ("black stuff") genre, follows Andrei as he explores his heritage and the relationship he begins with his father.

Luna Park was shown at the Toronto Festival of Festivals on 13 September 1992, and was released in New York in January 1994.

It was nominated for the Palme d'Or at the 1992 Cannes Film Festival. The composer Isaak Schwarz won a Nika Award from the Russian Academy of Cinema Arts and Sciences for the film's music.

== Plot ==
Set in a post-perestroika, post-Soviet Moscow, Luna Park follows the main character Andrei Leonov (Andrei Gutin) in his struggles to figure out who he is. At the beginning of the film, we see him as a young antisemitic skinhead bodybuilding leader of a group called "The Cleaners" who are set on purging Russia of anyone they deem unsuitable to the Russian bloodline, including, Jews, homosexuals, foreigners and mentally challenged individuals. The opening scene depicts a crowd of skinheads waving Russian flags and fighting a gang of bikers who they believed have succumbed to western influence and ideology. "The Cleaners" live in Luna Park, an amusement park, with wild roller coasters, and distorting mirrors and regularly head out into Moscow to cause chaos and destruction.

Having originally believed that his father was a Soviet war hero who died in a military plane crash in Afghanistan, he worships his father as the ideal Russian and strives to emulate him. When during a drunken night of confessions, he discovers that his father is actually a Jewish musician and still alive in Moscow, Andrei's life is turned upside-down, partly out of revulsion from whom he is descended, and partly because he wants to know (and be) with his father, and he must someway reconcile himself with this discovery.

Andrei's initial reaction of shock is furthered by his mother Aliona (Natalya Yegorova), who demands he kill his father for the pain that he caused her, when at a young age, his father seduced her (making her pregnant) and then did not cast her as a singer for an important role, which blighted her career after that.

As the movie progresses, Andrei's quest for his father is successful, and we are introduced to Naoum Kheifitz (Oleg Borisov), a once-influential Jewish composer and conductor who is now forced to make a living as an entertainer at private parties. Having spent time with his father, and seeing him as a charming, personable, yet impoverished gentle man, Andrei begins to overcome his hatred for Jewish culture.

His father accepts Andrei and dismisses his antisemitism, and proudly shows him off to his eccentric friends. This leads to a gradual change of Andrei's perspective, and he attempts to explain the situation to the members of his gang. They are not as accepting of his father, or of Andrei's Jewish roots, and they ransack Naoum's apartment, hang a young woman they find there, and abduct Naoum, taking him back to Luna Park. Andrei returns to the apartment and is horrified at the sight. He rushes to the park and saves his father, meanwhile the park catches fire, and Aliona chooses to perish with the park than face the reality of Andrei's choice.

The movie concludes with a scene of Andrei and Naoum getting on a train that's traveling to Siberia, under the assumption that they will start a new life together, free from the influence of the gang or the city.

== Cast ==
- Oleg Borisov as Naoum Kheifitz
- Andrei Gutin as Andrei Leonov
- Natalya Yegorova as Aliona
- Nonna Mordyukova as Aunt
- Mikhail Golubovich as Mute Guy
- Aleksandr Feklistov as Boris Ivanovich
- Tatyana Lebedkova as Prostitute
- Aleksandr Savin as Saniok

== Themes ==
Luna Park is a member of the short lived Russian film genre chernukha, which deals with the everyday realities that people faced at the end of the Soviet rule, but also shortly after, as Russia struggled to create a new identity. Very much a movie about the post-Soviet struggle for a new identity, the violence portrayed by the gang is used to highlight the un-ease felt by the general population at the time.

Dealing with the issues of antisemitism and attitudes towards minorities in Russia at the time, Luna Park relies heavily on showcasing the nation as it actually was, and Pavel Lungin uses a setting of darkness and showcasing the drabness of actual life to illustrate the misery of the everyday person. The cramped, often hectic apartment of Naoum Kheifitz (Oleg Borisov) is an excellent example showing some of the living conditions people were faced with at the end of the Soviet period.

== Release ==
Luna Park was originally released in Russia on 9 September 1992, and shown at the Toronto Festival of Festivals on 13 September 1992. It was screened at the Cannes Film Festival in May 1992.

== Reception ==
Luna Park received mediocre reviews from North American film critics. Janet Maslin from The New York Times noted it as being "murky and jumbled" and John Griffin of The Montreal Gazette claimed it was a "long - too long- strange trip" into the way of post-Soviet Russian life.

== Awards and nominations ==
Honors

1992 — Film Award Golden Aries Award (Russia)
Best Actor — Oleg Borisov

1992 — Nika Award
Best Music Score — Isaac Schwartz

Nominations

1992 — Cannes Film Festival
Nominated for the Palme d'Or.
