= Taras Bulba (2009 film) =

- Movie poster
- Directed by: Vladimir Bortko
- Written by: Vladimir Bortko
- Starring: Bohdan Stupka; Igor Petrenko; Vladimir Vdovichenkov; Magdalena Mielcarz
- Cinematography: Dmitry Mass
- Music by: Igor Kornelyuk
- Distributed by: Central Partnership (Russia); 20th Century Fox (USA); MGM Distribution Co. (Germany)
- Release date: 2 April 2009
- Running time: 127 minutes
- Language: Russian
- Budget: $15.7 million
- Box office: $17,040,803

Taras Bulba (Russian: and Ukrainian: «Тарас Бульба») is a historical drama film, based on the novel Taras Bulba by Nikolai Gogol. The movie was filmed on different locations in Ukraine such as Zaporizhia, Khotyn and Kamianets-Podilsky as well as in Poland. The official release was rescheduled several times; at first for the spring of 2008 but was finally released on April 2, 2009, to coincide with Gogol's bicentennial. The author's edition of 1842, expanded and rewritten, and considered more pro-Russian, was used for the film (this also being the text that is familiar to most readers).

The film DVD was released in the United States under the alternate title The Conqueror in 2010, and in the UK in 2011 as Iron & Blood: The Legend of Taras Bulba.

== Cast ==
- Bohdan Stupka as Taras Bulba
- Igor Petrenko as Andriy Bulba
- Vladimir Vdovichenkov as Ostap Bulba
- Magdalena Mielcarz as Panna Elzhbeta
- Mikhail Boyarsky as Cossack Moisei Shilo
- Vladimir Ilyin as former ataman
- Yury Belyayev as Kirdyaga, ataman
- Ada Rogovtseva as Taras Bulba's wife
- Boris Khmelnitsky as Beard
- Daniel Olbrychski as Krasnevsky
- Sergey Bezrukov as Narrator
- Liubomiras Laucevičius as Polish Duke
- Pyotr Zaychenko as Metelitsa
- Les Serdyuk as Dmytro
- Aleksandr Dedyushko as Stepan Guska
- Ivan I. Krasko as Kasyan Bovdyug
- Sergey Dreyden as Yankel

== Controversies ==
The film was partly financed by the Russian Ministry of Culture and has been criticized in Ukraine for being a part of political propaganda "resembling leaflets for Putin".

The director Vladimir Bortko has also stated that the movie aimed to show that "there is no separate Ukraine":

The Russians and Ukrainians are the same people and Ukraine is the southern part of the Rus'. They cannot exist without us and we cannot without them. Now we are two states and also in the past there were such periods. The Ukrainian soil belonged to the Grand Duchy of Lithuania and to Poland. But the people who lived on both territories were always one people. Gogol understood that well and always spoke of it.

This view is strongly opposed by Ukrainians. In Russia there were fears that the movie would exacerbate historical disagreements with Ukraine. On April 7, 2022, in the midst of the 2022 Russian invasion of Ukraine, the film was re-released to Russian cinemas.

The film was also cautiously watched in Poland, where its possible anti-Polish character was widely discussed and its propagandist elements examined. This was enhanced by the fact that the filmmakers added some scenes depicting Polish brutality to the original plot by Gogol. The cover of the US DVD edition (titled The Conqueror) has the tagline "Between Fire and the Sword Lies a Hero", a possible underhand reference to Polish historical fiction book and film With Fire and Sword (Polish: Ogniem i mieczem).
