= The Veldt (film) =

- Directed by: Nasim Tulyakhodzhayev
- Written by: Nasim Tulyakhodzhayev
- Starring: Yury Belyayev; Nelly Pshena; George Gegechkori
- Cinematography: Aloisas Yanchoras
- Music by: Felix Yanov-Yanovsky
- Production company: Uzbekfilm
- Release date: 10 June 1987 (Soviet Union)
- Running time: 81 minutes
- Country: Soviet Union
- Language: Russian

The Veldt (Russian: Вельд, romanized: Veld) is a 1987 Soviet dystopic science fiction horror film directed by Nasim Tulyakhodzhayev based on various stories by Ray Bradbury.

The film is based on the 1950 short story "The Veldt", and also includes story lines from other texts: "The Dragon", "Marionettes, Inc.", "The Pedestrian", the chapter "The Martian" from The Martian Chronicles (1950) and the episode concerning the death of Colonel Freelya of Dandelion Wine (1957).

== Plot ==
In a huge gloomy mansion lives the Stone family — Michael, his wife Linda and the children Peter and Wendy. They do not communicate with each other as the children spend all their time in a virtual reality room with visualizations of various scenarios. They are especially preoccupied by the hunting scene of African lions. Michael tries to lock the room, but this only increases the animosity of the children.

In the hut on the beach, lives the old fisherman Hernando and his blind wife Cora. Their whole life is consumed by the memories of their dead son Tom. And then one day a certain boy comes to them, completely like Tom. However, the idyll does not last long - a special quarantine team comes to the shack, which destroys creatures living with people under the guise of their deceased relatives.

However, not only the aliens are victims of quarantine teams and one night when Michael meets them, he is taken to an old ravine and left there for dead. Barely alive, Stone finds himself at the ruins of a church, where he meets Hernando. Michael is trying to take the family and move away from this nightmarish life, but children do not like it at all. They lure their parents into the nursery, where the latter become victims of lions.

Hernando, taking from the church a huge wooden cross, tries to plow the dunes. His work is observed by the madman "Gandhi".

== Cast ==
- Yury Belyayev - Michael
- Nelly Pshena - Linda
- George Gegechkori - Hernando
- Tamara Shirtladze - Cora
- Henrikas Kurauskas - Colonel Stone
- Valentinas Masalskis - David McClean
- Vladas Bagdonas-Barton
- Daryus Palekas - Peter
- Sigut Larionovayte - Wendy
- Daryus Tsitsinas - Tom
- Gitis Padegimas - Gandhi
- Kristina Andreiauskaite - nurse
