= Viktor Dotsenko =

Russian author

Viktor Dotsenko is a Russian author. The author of a series of action/adventure novels featuring Savely Govorkov, Dotsenko has often appeared on best-seller lists and was one of the best-selling authors in Russia in the 1990s. According to 2007's Literature, History and Identity in Post-Soviet Russia, Dotsenko's thrillers of the 1990s bore patriotic and anti-Western themes. 2007's Literary Russia: A Guide credits him, alongside Alexandra Marinina, with pioneering the thriller genre in Russia.
