= Igor Livanov =

Russian actor

- Born: Igor Yevgenyevich Livanov; 15 November 1953 (age 72); Kiev, Ukrainian SSR, Soviet Union
- Occupation: Actor
- Years active: 1978-present
- Spouse: Olga Livanova
- Children: 4

Igor Yevgenyevich Livanov (Russian: И́горь Евге́ньевич Лива́нов; born 15 November 1953, Kiev, Ukrainian SSR, USSR) is a Soviet and Russian film and theater actor. Meritorious Artist of the Russian Federation (2004). Younger brother of actor Aristarkh Livanov.

== Biography ==
Igor was born on 15 November 1953 in Kiev.

Mother Nina Timofeevna Livanova, father Yevgeny Aristarkhovich Livanov. Parents were heads of theatrical puppet club in the House of Pioneers of the October District in Kiev. Older brother Aristarkh (born 17 March 1947). Since fifth grade, Igor has been boxing.

After leaving school he went to Leningrad. Entered LGITMiK on course of Igor Gorbachyov, who graduated in 1975. Since 1976 he was in active military service in the Soviet Marines.

From 1986 to 1988 he led the actors workshop at the Rostov College of Arts. He worked in the Moscow Experimental Theater at the invitation of his namesake, artistic director of the theater Vasily Livanov. Now in the troupe of the Moscow Moon Theatre of Sergei Prokhanov.

In cinema Livanov made his debut in 1979 as Nikolai Torsuev in the Soviet lyrical drama Unrequited Love directed by Andrei Malyukov. His partners in this film were famous Soviet actors Leonid Markov and Inna Makarova.

In 2003, he participated in the reality show Last Hero 3.

== Selected filmography ==
- Mercedes Is Getting Away From The Chase as Sasha Ermolenko, translator (1980)
- The Astrologer as Kurt Rothenberg (1986)
- Terminate the Thirtieth! as Savely Govorkov (1992)
- At the corner, at the Patriarch Ponds as Sergey Vasilievich Nikolsky, police officer (1995-2004, TV Series)
- A Play for a Passenger as Nikolay (1995)
- La Dame de Monsoreau as d'Antrague (1997, TV Series)
- Empire under Attack as Putilovsky (2000, miniseries)
- 72 Meters as Captain Nikolai Konovalenko (2004)
- Vangelia as Hitler (2013, TV Series)
- The Embassy as Alexey Prokofiev, Ambassador of the Russian Federation in Caledonia (2018, TV Series)

== Personal life ==
The first wife Tatyana Piskunova and daughter Olga died tragically in Kamensk-Shakhtinsky rail disaster.

The second wife Irina is a former student Igor from Volgodonsk. They had a son, Andrei (1989 — 2015). In 2000, the marriage broke up, Irina went to the actor Sergey Bezrukov.

Currently Igor's wife is Olga (born in 1978). The couple have two children.
