= Siberia, Monamour =

- Film poster
- Russian: Сибирь. Монамур
- Directed by: Vyacheslav Ross
- Written by: Vyacheslav Ross
- Produced by: Igor Chekalin; Julia Leonova; Vyacheslav Ross; Andrey Skurikhin; Pavel Skurikhin; Vadim Zhuk
- Starring: Pyotr Zaychenko; Mikhail Protsko; Sergey Novikov; Lidiya Bayrashevskaya; Sonya Ross
- Cinematography: Yury Rayskiy
- Edited by: Igor Litoninskiy
- Music by: Aidar Gainullin
- Release date: 20 April 2011
- Country: Russia
- Language: Russian

Siberia, Monamour (Russian: Сибирь. Монамур, romanized: Sibir. Monamur) is a 2011 Russian drama film directed by Vyacheslav Ross.

== Plot ==
The film takes place in a Siberian village. The old man and grandson are waiting for the return of the boy's father to the house. Husband and wife have three daughters, but they have nothing else in common. A man who has gone through two wars is trying to find himself. Characters will have to make a difficult choice, embark on the path of humanity and compassion.

== Cast ==
- Pyotr Zaychenko as Ivan
- Mikhail Protsko as Lyoshka
- Sergey Novikov as Uncle Yura
- Lidiya Bayrashevskaya as Anna
- Sonya Ross as Luba
- Nikolay Kozak as captain
- Maksim Emelyanov as Zheleznyak
- Sergei Puskepalis as lieutenant colonel
- Yuriy Gumirov as major
- Sergey Tsepov as Zakhar
