= Savely Govorkov =

- First appearance: His Nickname Is 'Beast' (1989)
- Last appearance: Return of the Furious (2005)
- Created by: Victor Dotsenko
- Portrayed by: Igor Livanov (1992 film); Dmitry Pevtsov (1989 film)

In-universe information
- Alias: Beast, Rex, Furious
- Nickname: 30th
- Title: Sergeant

Sergeant Savely Govorkov (nicknamed Furious, also called Sergei (Rex) Govorkov in films) is a fictional character featuring in novels by Victor Dotsenko and others in the Soviet Union. A breakout character, Govorkov was created by Victor Dotsenko in the 1980s and by 1995 had featured in a number of novels by Dotsenko, making Dotsenko the most published and highest paid Russian writer. He appeared in more than twenty novels, all of them became a bestsellers. Other writers who have prominently featured the character in their works include Yuri Nikitin, Anton Pervushin, Valery Roschin, Kirill Vorobyev.

In the films portraying the character, his name was changed from the unusual Russian name "Savely" to the more common and catchy "Sergie". In the 1992 Soviet action/adventure film Terminate the Thirtieth!, based on the book by the same name, the character is played by Igor Livanov.

== Short description ==
Savely Govorkov is a fictional character who squares off against the mafia, criminals, corrupt politicians, Chechen terrorists, and foreign enemies, saving President Yeltsin and receiving a Purple Heart from US authorities. A veteran of the Afghan war, he is almost superheroic in his approach, often compared to Rambo.
