= Stalker (film festival) =

Human rights film festival in Russia

International Human Rights Film Festival "Stalker"
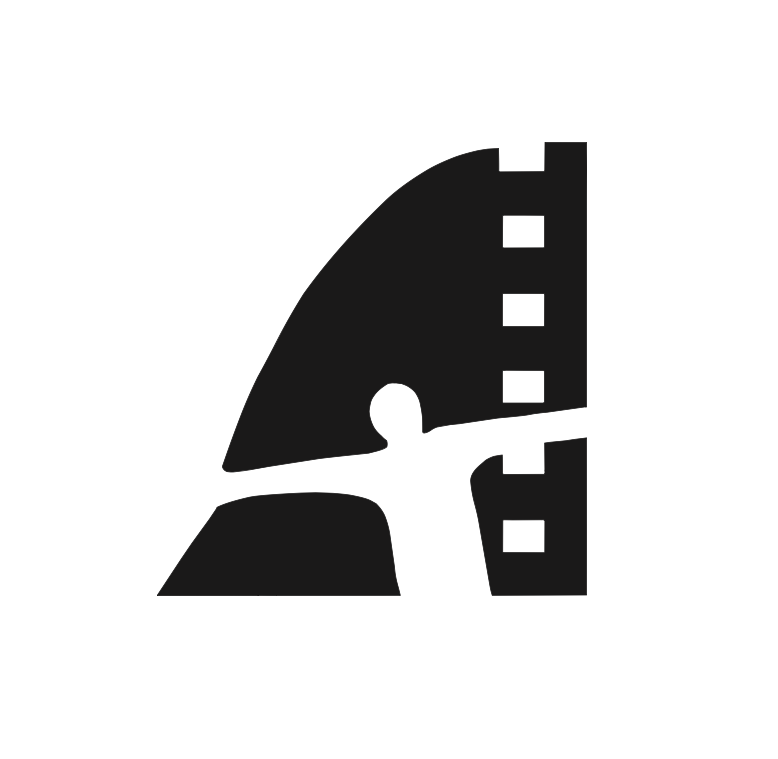
- Location: Moscow and regional cities
- Established: 1995
- Founded by: Russian Guild of Film Directors, Moscow Guild of Theater and Film Actors, Union of Russian Journalists
- Directors: Vadim Abdrashitov
- Festival date: 11 - 15 July 2022
- Language: Russian
- Website: www.stalkerfest.org

International Human Rights Film Festival "Stalker" (Russian: Международный фестиваль фильмов о правах человека «Сталкер»), also translated as Stalker: International Film Festival on Human Rights and also known simply as Stalker or Stalker Film Festival, is a film festival held annually in Moscow and regional centres of Russia since 1995. Its focus is human rights and it is run by the Russian Guild of Film Directors.

== History ==
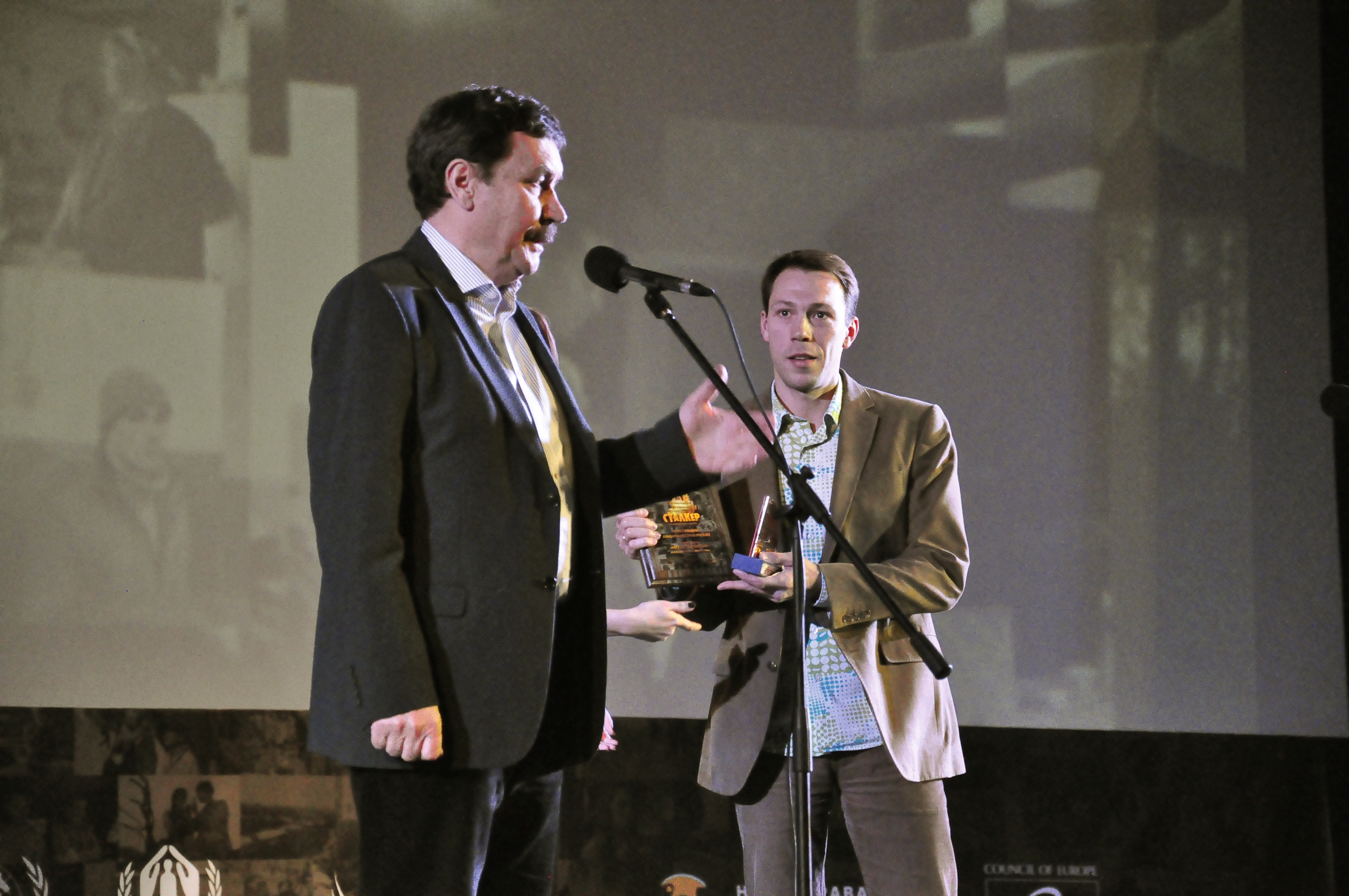
Vadim Abdrashitov and Konstantin Balakirev at Stalker, 15 December 2015

Stalker was established in 1995 after a group of Russian filmmakers were examining the Soviet period of Russian history, in particular the Stalinist purges of the 1930s, in which many people were deprived of their liberty. The name is derived from Russian director Andrei Tarkovsky's film, Stalker, which celebrates and emphasises the eternal and universal values of mercy and love for one's neighbour, and individuals' personal responsibility to society. In the film, a "stalker" is a professional guide to "the Zone", someone having the ability and desire to cross the border into the dangerous and forbidden place with a specific goal. The director said that "the Zone doesn't symbolise anything, any more than anything else does in my films: the zone is a zone, it's life". The intent of the festival was "an attempt to penetrate into 'the zone' little explored and exciting us all".

The festival was founded by the Russian Guild of Film Directors.

Actor Georgiy Zhzhonov (1915–2005) was a jury member at the festival for a number of years. He also travelled around the country throughout the year with Stalker, and addressed the audiences.

The MacArthur Foundation, a U.S.-based philanthropic organisation, awarded a total of around $850,000 in six separate grants to the Guild between 2005 and 2014 to support the festival.

In 2010, one of its regional events took place in the public library in Rostov-on-Don. It was the fifth time that the event had been held in the city, but this was the first time it had been funded by a grant from the European Union. Feature films dedicated to peace in the Caucasus were screened, and included Q&A sessions with the filmmakers. Vadim Abdrashitov's film Dancer's Time was the first to be shown.

In recent years, described as a "large-scale film event", Stalker has been held in Kursk.

In December 2020, at the 26th edition of the film festival, makers of animated films were included in the awards for the first time.

== Aims and description ==
The festival aims to raise awareness of and educate audiences about human rights by means of cinema, and to encourage filmmakers who make films about human rights. It presents the best feature films and documentaries on the theme of human rights, not just for a small group of professionals, but for a huge audience. Cinema is seen as a way to connect and communicate with a large number of viewers. It gives people the opportunity to watch and discuss films representing standards and norms for the protection of human rights, that are enshrined in Russian laws, international conventions and the Universal Declaration of Human Rights. It is non-commercial and non-political, and all screenings are free.

The film festival opens on 10 December each year, the day when adoption of the Universal Declaration of Human Rights is commemorated worldwide. On this day, Stalker Special Prizes for Human Rights are awarded to human rights heroes of documentaries in Moscow.

The main programs of the film festival are:

- Feature and Documentary Film Competition
- International Panorama of Human Rights Films
- Film festival events in the regions of Russia, known as "Charity Actions" (during the following year)

There are over 120 participating films each year, which are seen by tens of thousands of viewers in the main festival in Moscow, and then more than 100,000 viewers participate in free screenings and discussions across ten Russian cities. People are thus educated in the field of human rights protection. The Stalker Film Festival is now a significant event in the social and cultural life of Russia, and continues to reflect the range of human rights issues in the world by cinematic means.

The 2022 Stalker festival runs from 10 to 15 December 2022.

== Governance ==
It is run by the Russian Guild of Film Directors in collaboration with its major partner, the Mikhail Prokhorov Foundation, which described the festival as "The only such festival in Russia... which is aimed at establishing a consciousness of legal rights among wide audiences by the use of film – and to encourage filmmakers to make movies about human rights".

Vadim Abdrashitov, a People's Artist of Russia, is president of the Guild and of the festival.

== Awards ==
=== 2021 ===
In 2021, the human rights hero who features in Anna Artemyeva's Don’t Shoot at the Bald Man!, Major Vyacheslav Izmailov, won the hero's prize, and the film won the jury prize for Best Documentary. Major Izmailov is said to have rescued at least 174 people from captivity on both sides in the First Chechen War in the mid-1990s. In 2007, then retired and working as military correspondent for Novaya Gazeta, and part of the team of journalists investigating the murder of journalist Anna Politkovskaya in 2006, Izmailov claimed to know who had ordered her death. He also helped families to find their sons who had gone missing in the Chechen war.

Natalya Kudryashova's (Note: Also spelt Natalia Kudryashova) film Gerda (film) received the Stalker award for Best Feature Film.

== See also ==
- Human rights in Russia
