= Pyotr Kolbasin =

- Born: Pyotr Nikolaevich Kolbasin; 20 June 1942 (age 83); Moscow, RSFSR, USSR
- Occupation: Actor
- Years active: 1962–present

Pyotr Nikolaevich Kolbasin (Russian: Пётр Никола́евич Колбасин; born 20 June 1942, Moscow, USSR) is an actor, director, producer, screenwriter, teacher of acting, journalist. Honorary Cinematographer of the Russian Federation.

== Biography ==
Kolbasin was born on 20 June 1942 in Moscow.

He made his debut in cinema in 1969 in a short film by Andrei Razumovsky The fifth day of the autumn exhibition. This was followed by a small role in the sensational Italian-Soviet film project Sunflowers famous Vittorio De Sica. In 1976 he graduated from the Directing Course Oleg Yefremov in the Moscow Art Theater School.

Movie a career largely remained unrealized as at the end of the Studio School Kolbasin was sent to regional theaters (Ordzhonikidze, Rostov-na-Donu, Kuibyshev, Kalinin, Yakutsk, Biysk).

In 1985, the direction of the Ministry of Culture of the RSFSR came to work in Yakutsk in the Russian Drama Theatre. Thanks to the initiative Kolbasina Yakutia has received the youth theater studio. As a radio journalist created and led a number of cognitive and comedy programs. He was director of radio plays. As an operator and director has produced 73 TV copyright, number of stories on the Channel One Russia and All-Russia State Television and Radio Broadcasting Company.

In 2002, he acted as the director of the film of Sergei Yesenin Life-long Song With... commissioned by the Russian State Committee for Cinematography of the Russian Federation Ministry of Culture.

Member of the organizing committee of the first film festival in Yakutia Sun Horse (2003).

== Filmography ==
- 1969: The Fifth Day of the Autumn Exhibition (short film)
- 1970: Sunflower as episode (uncredited)
- 1970: Calling You Taimyr as accompanist
- 1970: The Love for Three Oranges as painter
- 1971: Trial on the Road as episode (uncredited)
- 1972: The Last Day as policeman
- 1973: Siberian Grandfather as revolutionary Postyshev
- 1980: There, Behind the Seven Mountains
- 1982: The Train Has Stopped as Valery Gubkin, assistant driver’s
- 1983: This Cruel Game Hockey as Gennady Stepanovich
- 1984: Planet Parade as tankman
- 1985: On Paycheck to Paycheck as Gera
- 1986: Mikhail Lomonosov (3 Series) as episode
- 1987: The Garden of Desires as Ivan
- 2003: Black Mask (last role)
