= Ladies Invite Gentlemen =

- Russian: Дамы приглашают кавалеров
- Directed by: Ivan Kiasashvili
- Written by: Aleksandr Borodyanskiy; Karen Shakhnazarov; Lev Slavin
- Starring: Marina Neyolova; Natalya Andreychenko; Mariya Vinogradova; Tatyana Bozhok; Leonid Kuravlyov
- Cinematography: Igor Bek
- Music by: Bogdan Trotsyuk
- Release date: 1980
- Running time: 76 minute
- Country: Soviet Union
- Language: Russian

Ladies Invite Gentlemen (Russian: Дамы приглашают кавалеров) is a 1980 Soviet romantic comedy-drama film directed by Ivan Kiasashvili.

The film tells about a woman who dreams of a happy personal life, but she is unlucky.

== Plot ==
Anna Pozdnyakova, a kind and charming clerk at a small-town general goods store in Povarykhino, is in her thirties and struggling to find love. Though she hopes to settle down, her romantic prospects seem slim. When she sets her sights on Viktor, a dashing warrant officer, her plans are dashed when he falls for and marries her friend Raisa. Disheartened, Anna takes an unpaid leave and travels to the southern resort of Sochi. There, she has a series of misadventures, including meeting Valentin, a self-professed card shark and gigolo. After he abandons her with a hefty restaurant bill, Anna is left with little money and must call home for help. Fortunately, a local operator, Marina, invites her to stay, and they quickly bond while exploring the beautiful city.

During her time in Sochi, Anna meets Sania, a lonely, kindhearted, and somewhat eccentric man who soon proposes marriage. Though Sania is sincere, Anna hesitates, feeling pressured to love him but struggling to develop genuine feelings. Ultimately, she agrees to travel with him to Ulan-Ude but, plagued by doubt, flees the ship at the last moment, returning to her hometown. Determined, Sania follows her, proving the depth of his commitment. Back in Povarykhino, Anna finds Sania waiting outside her home, and as they gaze at each other and share a smile.

== Cast ==
- Marina Neyolova as Anya Pozdnyakova
- Natalya Andreychenko as Raisa
- Mariya Vinogradova as Aunt Klava
- Tatyana Bozhok as Marina
- Leonid Kuravlyov as Sanya Svintsov
- Aleksandr Fatyushin as Victor
- Nikolay Karachentsov as Valentin
- Valeriy Nosik as Moremukhin
- Aleksandr Solovyov as Sergey
- Gia Peradze as Anzor
