= Marina Neyolova =

Soviet actress

- Марина Неёлова
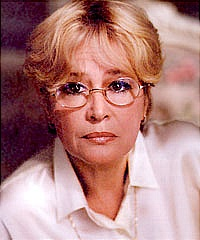
- Born: Marina Mstislavovna Neyolova; Leningrad, RSFSR, Soviet Union
- Occupation: Actress
- Years active: 1968–present

Marina Mstislavovna Neyolova (Russian: Мари́на Мстисла́вовна Неёлова) is a Soviet and Russian stage and film actress. She has appeared in 37 films since 1969. She was awarded the People's Artist of the RSFSR in 1987.

She is a leading actress at Sovremennik Theatre, where she has been working since 1974.

== Filmography ==
- An Old, Old Tale (Russian: Старая, старая сказка, 1968) as princess / daughter of innkeeper
- Tomorrow, on April 3rd... (Завтра, третьего апреля..., 1969) as Ariadna Nikolayevna (voice, role played by Eneken Aksel)
- Shadow (Тень, 1971) as Annuanciata
- Monologue (Монолог, 1972) as Nina
- The Prince and the Pauper (Принц и нищий, 1972) as Elizabeth I
- With You and Without You (С тобой и без тебя, 1973) as Stesha
- Speech for the Defence (Слово для защиты, 1976) as Valentina Kostina
- Errors of Youth (Ошибки юности, 1978) as Polina
- Autumn Marathon (Осенний марафон, 1979) as Alla Mikhailovna Yermakova
- Ladies Invite Gentlemen (Дамы приглашают кавалеров, 1980) as Anya Pozdnyakova
- Alice in Wonderland (Алиса в Стране чудес, 1981) as Alice (voice)
- The Story of Voyages (Сказка странствий, 1983) as Martha (voice, role played by Tatyana Aksyuta)
- Another Man's Wife and a Husband Under the Bed (Чужая жена и муж под кроватью, 1984) as Lisa
- The Black Monk (Чёрный монах, 1988) as Tatyana Pesotskaya (voice, role played by Tatyana Drubich)
- Dear Yelena Sergeyevna (Дорогая Елена Сергеевна, 1988) as Yelena Sergeyevna
- You Are My Only Love (Ты у меня одна, 1993) as Natalya Anatolyevna Semyonova-Timoshina
- Prison Romance (Тюремный романс, 1993) as Yelena Andreyevna Shemelova
- Inspector (Ревизор, 1996) as Anna Andreyevna
- The Barber of Siberia (Сибирский цирюльник, 1998) as Andrei Tolstoi's mother
- Azazel (Азазель, 2002) as Lady Ester
- Alice in Wonderland (2010) as Mallymkun, the Dormouse (Russian dub)
- Alice Through the Looking Glass (2016) as Mallymkun, the Dormouse (Russian dub)
- Thawed Carp (Карп отмороженный, 2017) as Yelena Mikhailovna Nikiforova
