= The Garden of Desires =

- Directed by: Ali Khamraev
- Written by: Sergey Lazutkin
- Produced by: Lyudmila Gabelaya
- Starring: Marianna Velizheva
- Cinematography: Vladimir Klimov
- Edited by: Vera Ostrinskaya
- Music by: Johann Sebastian Bach
- Production company: Mosfilm
- Release date: 1987
- Running time: 98 minutes
- Country: Soviet Union
- Language: Russian

The Garden of Desires (Russian: Сад желаний, romanized: Sad zhelaniy) is a 1987 Soviet drama film directed by Ali Hamroyev.

== Plot ==
The film is set during the last summer before the Great Patriotic War. Three sisters are coming to stay with their grandmother in the village. They imagine the world as a vast and charming garden of desires and all members of the household are waiting for Asya's birthday. Asya has a sense of foreboding regarding the impending grief. Guests come to visit but none of them are her parents. She still does not know that her father was declared an enemy of the people, that tomorrow she will not see her mother and that the war is approaching.

== Cast ==
- Marianna Velizheva as Asya
- Irina Shustaeva as Valeria, big sister
- Olga Zarkhina as Tomka, younger sister
- Galina Makarova as grandma
- Mikhail Brylkin as grandfather
- Aleksandr Feklistov as Pavel
- Lev Prygunov as Kirill, father Tomka's and Lera's
- Svetlana Tormakhova as mother Asya's
- Pyotr Kolbasin as Ivan, uncle Asya's
- Kira Muratova as witch

== Criticism ==
Sergey Kudryavtsev

Against the background of these frightening details that break into the bright world of girls' dreams and violate its natural harmony, the feeling of happiness, the joy of being, of some golden age of the socialist empire, is incomprehensibly dominating.

Alexander Fyodorov

Young performers played not at all simple roles emotionally, uninhibitedly, without professional templates. Each of the sisters has his own character, temperament, a look at the world.
