= Mikhail Golubovich =

Actor (1943–2023)

Mikhail Golubovich

Mikhail Vasilyevich Golubovich (Russian: Михаил Васильевич Голубович, Ukrainian: Михайло Васильович Голубович, romanized: Mykhailo Vasylyovych Holubovych; 21 November 1943 – 9 October 2023) was a Soviet, Ukrainian, and Russian stage and film actor. He was awarded the People's Artist of Ukraine in 1977, and the People’s Artist of Lugansk People's Republic in 2015. He was also honoured as Art Worker of the Russian Federation in 2023.

== Life and career ==
Mikhail Vasilyevich Golubovich was born in Zolotonosha on 21 November 1943.

In 2014 he served as the Head of the Luhansk Academic Ukrainian Music and Drama Theater, continuing in this position after the Russian takeover of Luhansk.

On 8 April 2022, against the backdrop of Russia’s invasion of Ukraine, he came under sanctions from the European Union due to his position on the People's Council of the Luhansk People's Republic.

Golubovich died on 9 October 2023, at the age of 79.

== Selected filmography ==
- The Lost Letter (1972) as evil man
- At the World's Limit (1975) as Pavel
- The Road to Calvary (1977) as Ivan Sorokin
- Lone Wolf (1978) as Biryuk
- Luna Park (1992) as Mute Guy
- Children of Iron Gods (1993) as Nasekin
- Brothel Lights (2011) as Wilhelm
