= Planet Parade =

- Directed by: Vadim Abdrashitov
- Written by: Aleksandr Mindadze
- Starring: Oleg Borisov; Liliya Gritsenko; Aleksei Zharkov
- Cinematography: Vladimir Shevtsik
- Edited by: Roza Rogatkina
- Music by: Vyacheslav Ganelin
- Production company: Mosfilm
- Distributed by: Lizard Cinema Trade
- Release date: 1984
- Running time: 97 minutes
- Country: Soviet Union
- Language: Russian

Planet Parade (Russian: Парад планет, romanized: Parad planet) is a 1984 Soviet fantasy drama film directed by Vadim Abdrashitov. The film's script was written by Aleksandr Mindadze and was based on the final part of the trilogy by Ukrainian writer Yevgeny Gutsalo, novel Planet Parade. It was nominated for the Golden Lion prize at the 42nd Venice International Film Festival.

== Plot ==
The film takes place in the USSR in 1984. Six forty-year-old men are cut off from ordinary life by draft for military reservists, the last one at their age. They represent a cross-section of the Soviet society of that time: an astronomer, a butcher from a shop, a factory worker, a loader, an architect, and a trolleybus driver (elected as people's deputy). Some of them know each other due to previous guerrilla assemblies and are friendly with each other, but by their own admission rarely spend time together — the reasons include work, mundane everyday life which leaves little time for leisure and, in general, differing interests and values. During the military exercises, their artillery battery, having successfully completed the task, was destroyed by the enemy, and the heroes, as ordered by the command, are seemingly dying. Thus, until the end of assembly, they remain in reserve for a few more days. Having missed the train to the city at the station, the heroes, having become "spirits from the other world", decide to finish the war game.

After leaving the training field of battle, the men begin a transcendental journey: they get to a city populated by only beautiful and solitary women. Having sailed across the river from this temptation, the detachment spends the night on the island and, taking the traveling chemist with them, end up in a retirement home, where by a clerk's mistake they are taken for a team of technicians from the repair construction office.

In the retirement home, the feeble-minded old lady mistakes Herman Kostin for her son Fedya, who disappeared during the war. By the will of the circumstances, Herman-Fedya is forced to play this role for several hours, during which he sums up the not very pleasant aspects of his life. Late in the evening, seven travelers with all the elderly inhabitants are trying to observe the mysterious planet parade.

After spending the night in an open field near the village of Guskovo and traveling all the way to the city on foot, the team of the men part, realizing that further men's games military assembly and exercises will not take place anymore, that the last stop has been placed in their departing youth, and most likely they will not meet again. Like planets with different orbits, they only met for a moment and lined up in a "planet parade" only to fly apart forever.

== Cast ==
=== Lead roles ===
- Oleg Borisov as Herman Ivanovich Kostin, astrophysicist, senior reserve lieutenant
- Liliya Gritsenko as Anna Vasilyevna
- Aleksei Zharkov as Ruslan Slonov
- Pyotr Zaychenko as Ivan Pukhov
- Sergei Nikonenko as Vasily Sergeyevich Afonin, MP, driver of a trolley and an army truck
- Aleksandr Pashutin as Spirkin, architect
- Boris Romanov as organic chemist
- Sergey Shakurov as Sultan, butcher from the deli

=== Supporting roles ===
- Vladimir Kashpur as manager of the Nursing Home
- Angelica Nevolina as Natasha, friend of Kostin
- Elena Mayorova as Slonov's girlfriend
- Marina Shimanskaya as Afonin's girlfriend
- Svetlana Evstratova as Spirkin's girlfriend
- Lidia Ezhevskaya as Pukhov's girlfriend
- Tatyana Kochemasova as Sultan's girlfriend
- Galina Shostko as Natalia Sergeevna
- Boris Smorchkov as artillery captain
- Liliya Makeeva as colleague of Kostin
- Alekhen Nigata as astronomer
- Alexander Zvenigorsky as painter
- Pyotr Kolbasin as tankman

== Awards ==
- ICF Neo-Realistic Film in Avellino (1984)
