= Anatoly Solonitsyn =

Russian actor

- Анатолий Солоницин
- Born: Otto Alekseyevich Solonitsyn; 30 August 1934; Bogorodsk, Russian SFSR, Soviet Union
- Died: 11 June 1982 (aged 47); Moscow, Russian SFSR, Soviet Union
- Occupation: Actor
- Years active: 1960–1982
- Awards: Silver Bear

Anatoly (Otto) Alekseyevich Solonitsyn (Russian: Анатолий (Отто) Алексеевич Солоницын; 30 August 1934 – 11 June 1982) was a Soviet actor known for his spiritually profound and deeply philosophical performances on stage and screen. Widely regarded as one of the greatest actors of the 20th century and one of the finest actors from the Soviet Union, he is revered for his work with Andrei Tarkovsky. He won the Silver Bear for Best Actor at the 31st Berlin International Film Festival.

== Film career ==
Solonitsyn was born in Bogorodsk. At birth, he was named Otto, after the polar explorer Otto Schmidt.

His debut in cinema was in the Sverdlovsk Film Studio's short film The Case of Kurt Clausewitz (1963), directed by Gleb Panfilov. Solonitsyn is best known in the west for his roles in several of Andrei Tarkovsky's films, including Dr. Sartorius in Solaris (1972), the Writer in Stalker (1979), the physician in Mirror (1975), and the titular role in Andrei Rublev (1966).

In his book Sculpting in Time, Tarkovsky calls Solonitsyn his favorite actor, and writes that Solonitsyn was intended to play the lead roles in his films Nostalghia (1983) and The Sacrifice (1986), but the actor died before their production. Tarkovsky admired Solonitsyn's ability to fully embody the ideas of the director. When Tarkovsky was considering making a film adaptation of Dostoevsky's famous novel The Idiot, Solonitsyn was even ready to undergo plastic surgery to look more like the great Russian writer.

In the former Soviet Union he was also well known for his roles in At Home Among Strangers (1974), The Train Has Stopped (1982), and many others.

== Awards ==
In 1981, he won the Silver Bear for Best Actor at the 31st Berlin International Film Festival for his role in Aleksandr Zarkhi's film Twenty Six Days from the Life of Dostoyevsky (1981). The same year, he was given the title of Honored Artist of the RSFSR.

== Death ==
Solonitsyn died from lung cancer in 1982, at the age of 47. Allegedly, according to Viktor Sharun, the sound editor on Stalker, Solonitsyn, Tarkovsky and Larisa Tarkovskaya became ill due to exposure to toxic chemicals during filming on the location of the movie.

== Filmography ==
Year	Title	Role	Notes
1966	Andrei Rublev	Andrei Rublev	
1968	No Path Through Fire	Ivan Yevstryukov	
1971	Trial on the Road	Major Igor Leonidovich Petushkov	
1972	Grandmaster	Sergey's father	
1972	The Love of Mankind	Dmitry Andreyevich Kalmykov	
1972	The Prince and the Pauper	Lord Saint John	
1972	Solaris	Dr. Sartorius, astrobiologist	
1974	Agony	Baroness' husband, colonel	Released in 1981
1974	At Home Among Strangers	Vasily Antonovich Sarychev	
1974	Under en steinhimmel	Hofmeyer, German colonel	
1975	Mirror	Forensic doctor, the passerby	
1975	Trust	Alexander Shotman	
1976	The Ascent	Pavel Gavrilovich Portnov, the Nazi interrogator	
1977	Bag of the Collector	Ivan Timofeyevich	
1978	The Turning Point	Konstantin Korolyov	
1979	The Bodyguard	Sultan-Nazar	
1979	Stalker	Writer	
1980	Life on Holidays	Tolik Chikin	
1980	Twenty Six Days from the Life of Dostoyevsky	Fyodor Dostoevsky	
1981	Muzhiki!	Pyotr the painter, Pavlik's father	
1982	The Train Has Stopped	Igor Malinin, journalist	Final film role
