= Fox Hunting (film) =

- Directed by: Vadim Abdrashitov
- Written by: Aleksandr Mindadze
- Produced by: Vitaly Boguslavsky
- Starring: Vladimir Gostyukhin; Irina Muravyova
- Cinematography: Yuri Nevsky
- Edited by: Roza Rogatkina
- Music by: Eduard Artemyev
- Production company: Mosfilm
- Release date: 22 December 1980
- Running time: 92 minutes
- Country: Soviet Union
- Language: Russian

Fox Hunting (Russian: Охота на лис, romanized: Okhota na lis) is a 1980 Soviet crime drama directed by Vadim Abdrashitov.

== Plot ==
Two youngsters mug a worker and are justly punished: one receives a suspended sentence, and the other goes to serve in the colony. But the victim is haunted by thoughts regarding the fate of these teenagers. He begins to regularly meet with the prisoners in the hope of getting to reach their hearts.

The protagonist of this drama is an enthusiast of the nowadays rare type of radiosport of the same name, fox hunting.

== Cast ==
- Vladimir Gostyukhin as Viktor Belov
- Irina Muravyova as Marina Belova
- Igor Nefyodov as Vladimir Belikov
- Dmitry Kharatyan as Kostya Stryzhak
- Alla Pokrovskaya as Olga Sergeyevna, Stryzhak's mother
- Andrey Turkov as Valerik, Belov's son
- Mikhail Bocharov as Viktor Semenovich, chairman of the factory committee
- Margarita Zharova as Judge
- Antonina Konchakova as Belikov's mother
- Nikolay Smorchkov as policeman

== Awards ==
- San Remo Film Festival — Best Director (Vadim Abdrashitov), Best Actor (Vladimir Gostyukhin)
