= Oleg Borisov =

Soviet-Russian actor (1929-1994)

- Олег Борисов
- Borisov in the film The Train Has Stopped
- Born: Albert Ivanovich Borisov; November 8, 1929; Yakovlevskiy, Russian SFSR, Soviet Union
- Died: April 28, 1994 (aged 64); Moscow, Russia
- Resting place: Novodevichy Cemetery, Moscow
- Occupation: Actor
- Years active: 1951–1994

Oleg Ivanovich Borisov (Note: Russian: Олег Иванович Борисов, romanized: Oleg Ivanovich Borisov) (8 November 1929 – 28 April 1994, born Albert Ivanovich Borisov) (Note: Russian: Альберт Иванович Борисов, romanized: Albert Ivanovich Borisov) was a Soviet and Russian stage and film actor. People's Artist of the USSR (1978).

== Biography ==
=== Childhood and youth ===
Oleg Borisov was born Albert Ivanovich Borisov on 8 November 1929 in Privolzhsk, Ivanovo Oblast. His given name was Albert, which was chosen by his mother in honor of the Belgian prince Albert, who visited Moscow in 1929. His parents were agricultural professionals. His mother, Nadezhda Andreyevna, was an agricultural engineer, and also played as an amateur actress at a local drama. His father, Ivan Borisov, was a wounded World War II veteran, who worked as director of Privolzhsk Agricultural Technical School.

=== Becoming an actor ===
Young Oleg Borisov was fond of acting and theatre, he was known as a good impersonator and comedian among his classmates at school. However, during the Second World War young Oleg Borisov was a tractor driver at a collective farm near Moscow. At the same time he was involved in amateur acting at his school drama class.

After World War II Borisov graduated from a secondary school and applied to study at the Moscow Art Theatre (MKhAT). He passed a series of professional tests and was admitted to the Moscow Art Theatre School of Acting in 1947. While a student Borisov was regarded for his talent as a comedian. In 1951, Borisov graduated from the MKhAT School of Acting, and joined the troupe of the Lesya Ukrainka National Academic Theater of Russian Drama in Kyiv. In 1954 he married Alla Romanovna (née Latynskaya), the daughter of the director of the Lesya Ukrainka Theatre. Their son, Yury Borisov, was born in 1956.

=== Leningrad ===
In 1964, director Georgy Tovstonogov invited Oleg Borisov to join the troupe of the Bolshoi Drama Theater (BDT). From 1964–1983 Borisov was a permanent member of the troupe at BDT in Leningrad (St. Petersburg). There his stage partners were Tatiana Doronina, Lyudmila Makarova, Kirill Lavrov, Vladislav Strzhelchik, Innokenty Smoktunovsky, Yefim Kopelyan, Oleg Basilashvili, Yevgeni Lebedev, Pavel Luspekayev, Sergei Yursky, Vsevolod Kuznetsov, Nikolay Trofimov, and other notable Russian actors. Borisov played memorable roles in several productions, such as, Grigori Melekhov in And Quiet Flows the Don by Mikhail Sholokhov, Prince Harry in King Henry IV (1969 adaptation) by Shakespeare, and Siply in Optimistic Tragedy by Vsevolod Vishnevsky. At that time he was also invited by director Lev Dodin to perform the leading role in Krotkaya (aka "A Gentle Creature") an adaptation of the eponymous short story by Fyodor Dostoevsky.

=== Film career ===
In 1955, Borisov made his film debut at the Dovzhenko Film Studio in Kyiv, Ukraine; he played a cameo role in film Mother (1955) by director Mark Donskoy. Eventually Oleg Borisov ascended to fame in Soviet and Russian cinema, as he continued his film career in collaboration with such directors as Eldar Ryazanov, Andrei Tarkovsky, Aleksandr Muratov, Aleksei German, Viktor Tregubovich, Vladimir Bortko, Aleksandr Gordon, Vladimir Vengerov, and Vadim Abdrashitov, among others. His best known roles in film were such works as Gudionov in Sluga by Vadim Abdrashitov, and Naoum Kheifitz in Luna Park by Pavel Lungin.

=== Personality ===
For several years Borisov suffered from restrictions in the Soviet film industry, because he did not comply with the rules of political obedience. The main reason was that Borisov never wanted to be a member of the Soviet Communist party. His personal revolt against the system resulted in several years of his underemployment; the system allowed him to play only little roles, making him almost invisible for a few years, a humiliation which he endured with dignity. Only director Vadim Abdrashitov was brave enough to break the Soviet censorship rules, he cast Borisov for the leading roles in his films The Train Has Stopped (1982) and Planet Parade (1984).

Borisov was at the peak of his stage and film career by the end of the 1970s, when suddenly he was dismissed by a film director for his disagreement about the movements of his character. Borisov chose his individual freedom at a high cost. He never was a slave of the Soviet system, and the system never let him have his freedom.

=== Moscow ===
Borisov suffered from professional restrictions, which caused him serious stress and medical complications. Only a few of his colleagues were able to understand his case. At that critical time Oleg Yefremov called Borisov in 1982, and invited him to work with the Moscow Art Theatre. From 1983-1990 Borisov was a member of the troupe with the Moscow Art Theatre. There his stage partners were Anastasiya Vertinskaya, Yevgeny Yevstigneyev, Andrey Myagkov, and other notable Russian actors. At the same time Borisov made stage works at the Moscow Central Theatre of the Soviet Army, such as, his acclaimed portrayal of the Emperor Paul I in the eponymous play by Dmitry Merezhkovsky. During the course of his acting career Borisov shared the views of Konstantin Stanislavski and Vladimir Nemirovich-Danchenko who believed that stage acting is a superior form of art. Borisov confessed that he had greater satisfaction from his stage works than from any film.

=== Recognition ===
For many years Oleg Borisov suffered from severe stress caused by political pressures on his acting career. He opposed the official system and contracted a stress-related blood disorder, a rare form of leukemia, which was misdiagnosed by the Soviet medical system. Borisov knew that his disease was incurable. Despite this, his private conversations with actors-friends sparkled with his wit and wisdom. As a result of this wisdom someone told him to write a book. He wrote notes for almost 20 years, before his death, which were then published posthumously by his son, director Yuri Borisov. Oleg Borisov was designated People's Artist of the USSR (1978) and received the USSR State Prize (1978) for his stage works. In 1990 Borisov won Volpi Cup at the Venice Film Festival. He played over 70 roles in film and television, directed stage productions and led several popular radio shows. In 1992 Oleg Borisov made a pilgrimage to Jerusalem together with his wife. He died of complications from a blood disorder on 28 April 1994 in Moscow, Russia.

== Selected filmography ==
- There Will Be No Leave Today (Сегодня увольнения не будет..., 1959) as Captain Galich
- Chasing Two Hares (За двумя зайцами, 1961) as Svirid Petrovich Golokhvosty
- Give me a complaints book (Дайте жалобную книгу, 1965) as Yuri Nikitin, journalist of the newspaper Youth
- Workers' Settlement (Рабочий посёлок, 1965) as Leonid
- At War as at War (На войне как на войне, 1969) as Mikhail Domeshek, tank crew member, sergeant
- Failure of Engineer Garin (Крах инженера Гарина, 1973) as Pyotr Garin
- Rafferty (Рафферти, 1980) as Jack Rafferty
- Treasure Island (Остров сокровищ, 1982) as Long John Silver
- The Train Has Stopped (Остановился поезд, 1982) as German Ivanovich Ermakov, investigator
- Planet Parade (Парад планет, 1984) as Herman Kostin
- Breakthrough (Прорыв, 1986) as Boris Poluektov
- The Gardener (Садовник, 1987)
- The Servant (Слуга, 1989) as Andrei Gudionov
- The Only Witness (Единственный свидетель, 1990) as Witness
- Luna Park (Луна-парк, 1992) as Naoum Kheifitz
- Devil, I'm Bored (Мне скучно, бес, 1993) as Mephistopheles / God
