= Aleksandr Feklistov =

Soviet and Russian actor

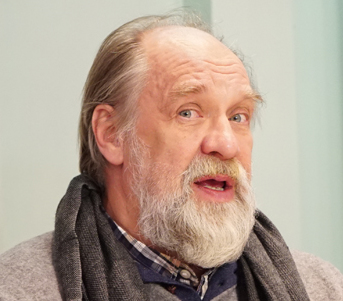
- Born: Aleksandr Vasilyevich Feklistov; December 7, 1955 (age 70); Leningrad, Soviet Union
- Education: Graduated from MKHAT (Moscow Art Theatre) School
- Occupation: Actor
- Years active: 1982–present
- Height: 5 ft 8 in (1.73 m)
- Awards: Golden Mask-Best Actor; Smoktunovsky prize-Winner as a theatrical actor

Aleksandr Vasilyevich Feklistov (Russian: Алекса́ндр Васи́льевич Фекли́стов; born December 7, 1955) is a Russian actor. He appeared in more than sixty films since 1984 (the film Troop).

Since 2007 – Vice President of the Chekhov Festival.

== Biography ==
Aleksandr Feklistov was born on December 7, 1955, in Leningrad. In 1982, he graduated from Moscow Art Theatre School (course Oleg Yefremov).

Since 1982, Feklistov has been a Moscow Art Theatre actor, and moved into the studio in 1988. Man, was one of the organizers of the Fifth Moscow Art Theatre. In 1995 he returned to the Art Theater, where he performed in the play Love in the Crimea. In 2001, Feklistov left the troupe.

=== Personal life ===
Aleksandr Vasilyevich is married and has three children.

In 2023, he left Russia for Spain.

== Political position ==
Aleksandr Feklistov denounced the policies of President Vladimir Putin with regard to Ukraine, Putin's actions in Ukraine and Crimea in 2014 and believes that this has a negative impact on Russia's image in the world. He also criticized the Russian invasion of Ukraine.

== Selected filmography ==
Film
Year	Title	Role	Notes
1987	Plumbum, or The Dangerous Game (Плюмбум, или опасная игра)	Grey-Hair	
1987	The Garden of Desires (Сад желаний)	Pavel	
1989	The Feasts of Belshazzar, or a Night with Stalin (Пиры Валтасара, или Ночь со Сталиным)	Uncle Sandro	
1991	The Inner Circle (Ближний круг)	Ivan Grigorievich Bolshakov	
1991	Anna Karamazoff (Анна Карамазофф)	Alexander Vasilievich	
1992	Luna Park (Луна-парк)	Boris Ivanovich	
1992	Prorva (Прорва)	Sasha	
1992	Stalin (Сталин)	Leonid Nikolaev	
1993	Children of Iron Gods (Дети чугунных богов)	Mityai	
1994	The Year of the Dog (Год собаки)	Lobanov	
1994	Petersburg secrets (Петербургские тайны)	Platon Alekseevich Zagurskii	
1994	Moscow Nights (Подмосковные вечера)	Mitya	
2000	Empire under Attack (Империя под ударом)	Pyotr Stolypin	TV
2000	The Envy of Gods (Зависть Богов)	Sergei	
2008	The Inhabited Island (Обитаемый остров)	Dever	
2017	NO-ONE	KGB officer	
2010-2021	Svaty (Сваты)	Alexander Berkovich	TV
2025	Short Summer	Grandpa	
