= At the World's Limit =

1975 film

- Russian: На край света…
- Directed by: Rodion Nahapetov
- Written by: Viktor Rozov
- Starring: Vera Glagoleva; Vadim Mikheyenko; Boris Andreyev; Mariya Vinogradova; Svetlana Konovalova
- Cinematography: Vladimir Klimov; Konstantin Suponitsky
- Edited by: Polina Skachkova
- Music by: Bogdan Trotsyuk
- Release date: 1975
- Running time: 92 minute
- Country: Soviet Union
- Language: Russian

At the World's Limit (Russian: На край света…) is a 1975 Soviet romantic drama film directed by Rodion Nahapetov.

The film tells about a guy named Volodya, who is tired of his relatives and decides to run away from them. On the way, he meets different people, gets a job at a construction site and falls in love.

== Plot ==
The protagonist, Volodya, or simply Vova, a young Muscovite who graduated two years ago, drifts through jobs, frustrating his parents with his carefree attitude and mockery. His father scolds him as "insensitive," while his mother, dissatisfied with his long hair, tries to cut it while he sleeps. Following another argument, Vova impulsively decides to visit his Uncle Vasya in a small town beyond the Urals. Although his uncle’s family welcomes him warmly, conversations inevitably turn to Vova’s need to find purpose. Upset, Vova storms off towards the station, and Uncle Vasya sends his daughter Sima to stop him. When Vova fails to board a train to Moscow, he heads down the railway tracks in anger, with Sima trailing behind. Along the way, they meet a track worker, a war veteran, who becomes furious at Vova’s disdain for Moscow, challenging his lack of patriotism.

As they journey together, Sima reveals she is adopted, which Vova finds thrilling, casting her as a "mystery." Despite his attempts to work, he grows disillusioned with corruption and eventually joins a construction crew, where Sima’s father tracks him down and warns him of his inner "demon." Vova, shaken by the tragic death of a crew member, begins to confront deeper emotions, grappling with fear and mortality. Later, the two find work at a shipyard, but Sima falls seriously ill with double pneumonia. In a moment of vulnerability, Vova writes her a love note, read to her by a doctor as she lies unconscious. In the closing scene, Sima recovers, and the two run through a field, joyfully declaring their feelings.

== Cast ==
- Vera Glagoleva
- Vadim Mikheyenko
- Boris Andreyev
- Mariya Vinogradova
- Svetlana Konovalova
- Vera Burlakova
- Leonid Chubarov
- Makhmud Esambayev
- Pyotr Glebov
- Mikhail Golubovich
