= The Train Has Stopped =

- Directed by: Vadim Abdrashitov
- Written by: Aleksandr Mindadze
- Produced by: Lyudmila Gabelaya
- Starring: Oleg Borisov; Anatoly Solonitsyn; Mikhail Gluzsky; Nina Ruslanova; Lyudmila Zaytseva; Nikolay Skorobogatov
- Cinematography: Yuri Nevsky
- Music by: Eduard Artemyev
- Release date: 1982
- Language: Russian

The Train Has Stopped (Russian: Oстановился пoeзд, romanized: Ostanovilsya poezd) is a 1982 Soviet drama film directed by Vadim Abdrashitov and written by Aleksandr Mindadze. The last film role of Anatoly Solonitsyn.

Before the official premiere, the film was shown in the spring of 1982 at the Concert Hall of the Moscow Institute of Physics and Technology.

== Plot ==
Late at night, a train accident happens. Four empty lorries suddenly roll down a slope and crash into a passenger train on high velocity. Only driver Timonin's courage, who until recently remained in the cabin of the locomotive and applied the emergency brake, helped to avoid a colossal calamity. However, the driver himself has died.

The tragedy is investigated by the detective German Ermakov. In his hotel room Ermakov meets with journalist Igor Malinin, one of the passengers of the ill-fated train. The subject of their conversation, of course, becomes the wreck. Malinin writes an enthusiastic article about the heroism of the driver Timonin but Ermakov, who compiles more and more information, understands that it's not so simple as it seems.

The immediate cause of the disaster becomes a chain of seemingly "minor" violations. Railroad shunter Panteleev ignores instructions and does not put in a second boot, causing the lorries to break away from their parked positions and roll out toward the passenger train. The head of the depot, Golovanov, does not observe protocol and releases a locomotive on the rails with a faulty speed gauge. And the dead driver Timonin absolutely had no right to start his run, without fixing the speed meter.

Investigator Ermakov formulates the results of his investigation in a very firm way: there was no heroism, and instead there was a large-scale carelessness that led to the death of a person. But this causes indignation and outright hatred directed towards Ermakov from the public and the leadership of the city, where Timonin lived. Even the journalist Malinin, initially experiencing sympathy towards the investigator is indignant towards the behavior of Ermakov. Let this be an act of bravery! — uttering this, the journalist takes the side of the majority.

== Cast ==
- Oleg Borisov as German Ivanovich Ermakov, investigator of Regional Prosecutor office
- Anatoly Solonitsyn as Igor Malinin, journalist
- Mikhail Gluzsky as Pyotr Filippovich Panteleev, railroad coupler
- Nina Ruslanova as Maria Ignatyevna, head of administration
- Lyudmila Zaytseva as Timonina, locomotive driver’s widow
- Nikolay Skorobogatov as Pavel Sergeyevich Golovanov, head of Custody
- Pyotr Kolbasin as Valery Gubkin, driver’s assistant
- Stanislav Korenev as Deputy Head of Administration
- Aleksandr Pashutin as a train passenger
- Eldar Ryazanov as a train passenger (uncredited)

== Awards ==
- 1984 — Vasilyev Brothers State Prize of the RSFSR:
  - Vadim Abdrashitov
  - Oleg Borisov
  - Aleksandr Mindadze
  - Yuri Nevsky
  - Alexander Tolkachyov
- 1984 — IFF author's film in San Remo, special jury prize for best screenplay (Aleksandr Mindadze)
