= Time of a Dancer =

- Russian: Время танцора
- Directed by: Vadim Abdrashitov
- Written by: Aleksandr Mindadze
- Produced by: Sergei Bayev
- Starring: Andrey Egorov; Yuri Stepanov; Sergey Garmash; Zurab Kipshidze; Chulpan Khamatova
- Cinematography: Yuriy Nevsky; Anatoly Susekov
- Edited by: Roza Rogatkina
- Music by: Viсtor Lebedev
- Production company: Mosfilm
- Release date: 1998
- Country: Russia
- Language: Russian

Time of a Dancer (Russian: Время танцора, romanized: Vremya tantsora), also translated as Dancer's Time, is a 1998 Russian war drama film directed by Vadim Abdrashitov.

== Plot ==
The soldiers have returned from a war. While they may have won on the battlefront but, they have lost too, because they have forgot how to live in peace. But the war did not destroy the most important thing in them: their will to live.

== Cast ==
- Andrey Egorov as Andrei Podobed
- Yuri Stepanov as Valeriy Belosheikin
- Sergei Garmash as Fiedel
- Zurab Kipshidze as Temur
- Chulpan Khamatova as Katya
- Svetlana Kopylova as Larisa, Valeriy's wife
- Vera Voronkova as Tamara
- Natalya Loskutova as Olga Pavlovna
- Sergei Nikonenko as Fyodor
- Mikhail Bogdasarov as Said

== Screenings ==
Time of a Dancer was screened in the Stalker Human Rights Film Festival's regional presentation in Rostov-on-Don in 2010, where Abdrashitov engaged in discussion about the film with the audience.

== Awards ==
- Nika Award (1997): Best Screenplay (Aleksandr Mindadze), Best Male Supporting Role (Zurab Kipshidze)
- Kinotavr (1998) Grand Prix
- Locarno Festival (1998) Special Jury Prize
