= Yury Belyayev =

Soviet and Russian actor

- Born: Yury Viktorovich Belyayev; 28 August 1947 (age 78); Poltavka, Poltavsky District, Omsk Oblast, RSFSR, USSR
- Occupation: Actor
- Years active: 1975–present

Yury Viktorovich Belyayev (Russian: Юрий Викторович Беляев; born 28 August 1947) is a Soviet and Russian film and theatre actor. He has received the title of Honored Artist of the Russian Federation (1995) and the USSR State Prize (1991).

== Biography ==
Belyayev began studying at drama school Stupinskaya Studio (Theatre Youth) under the direction of O. Livanova. After leaving school he worked in a factory, he served in the Soviet Army, worked as an instructor DOSAAF, a janitor.

In 1975, Belyayev graduated from the Shchukin Theatre School (course of Lyudmila Stavskaya). In the same year he became an actor of the Moscow Taganka Theater.

== Personal life ==
In May 2014 he married the actress Tatiana Abramova. From his first marriage he had two children, a daughter Olga and son Alexey.

== Selected filmography ==
- 1979 — On the Trail of the Ruler as Belov
- 1983 — The Mystery of Blackbirds as Percival Fortescue
- 1985 — Gunpowder as Nikonov
- 1985 — Aliens Do Not Go Here as Chumakov
- 1986 — Descended from Heaven as Hero of the Soviet Union Ivan Ivanovich
- 1987 — Moonzund as Alexander Kolchak
- 1987 — Once Lies as Alexander Grigorievich Kryukov, artist
- 1987 — The Veldt as Michael
- 1988 — The Servant as Pavel Sergeyevich Klyuev
- 1991 — The Assassin of the Tsar as Alexander II of Russia
- 1993 — The Woman in the Window as Valerian Chernyshov
- 1995 — A Play for a Passenger as Kuzmin
- 1997 — The Countess de Monsoreau as the Comte de Monsoreau
- 1997 — The Thief as Sanya (at 48 years old)
- 1997 — The Circus Burned Down and the Clowns Ran Away
- 1999 — Russian Riot as Commandant Mironov
- 2002 — Family Secrets as Alexander Ermakov
- 2003 — Tabloid Paperback
- 2005 — Escape as father of Irina
- 2005 — KGB in a Tuxedo as KGB's general
- 2006 — The Red Room as director
- 2006 — Diamonds for Dessert as Pavlik
- 2007 — Cadets as Colonel Kalashnikov
- 2007 — Kuka as Nikita
- 2007 — Teacher in Law as Boris Bogomolov
- 2008 — The Kremlin Cadets as Lt. Gen. Romanenko
- 2008 — White-Bear as Leonid Pavlovich Hrjapa
- 2009 — The US Government against Rudolph Abel as Rudolf Abel
- 2009 — Taras Bulba as Kirdyaga, ataman
- 2009 — Justice Wolves as Sergey
- 2010 — Kandagar as Sokovatov
- 2012 — Once in Rostov as Matvey Shaposhnikov, Lt. Gen.
- 2012 — Cordon Investigator Savelyev as Boris Kolotov
- 2015 — The Alchemist. Elixir of Faust as the official Ministry of Health
- 2017 — Sleepers as Alexander Ilyich Nefyodov
- 2017 — Godunov as Ivan Shuisky
- 2022 — Aeterna as Cardinal Sylvester
