= The Last Day (1972 film) =

- Directed by: Mikhail Ulyanov
- Written by: Boris Vasilyev; Mikhail Ulyanov
- Produced by: Yu. Galkovsky
- Starring: Oleg Tabakov
- Cinematography: Elizbar Karavayev
- Edited by: Tamara Zubrova
- Music by: Isaac Schwartz
- Production company: Mosfilm
- Release date: 12 February 1973
- Running time: 96 minutes
- Country: USSR
- Language: Russian

The Last Day (Russian: Самый последний день, romanized: Samy posledny den) is a 1972 Soviet drama film directed by Mikhail Ulyanov. The screen version of the play of the same name by Boris Vasilyev.

== Plot ==
On his last working day, the outgoing district plenipotentiary, junior police lieutenant Semyon Mitrofanovich Kovalyov, as usual, bypasses the site and solves the accumulated problems. Among the usual cases, parsing and talking with drunkards, he finds time for the neighbor girl Alla, who fell under the influence of the leader of the thieves' gang. Seeing her in the company of a young man, similar in description to a certain Valera, suspected of theft, he tries to detain him, but he is killed by a lethal blow.

== Cast ==
- Mikhail Ulyanov as Kovalyov
- Vyacheslav Nevinny as Stepan Danilovich Stepeshko
- Igor Kashintsev as Grisha
- Bohdan Stupka as Valery
- Mikhail Zhigalov as lieutenant
- Vladimir Nosik as Sergey
- Valentina Vladimirova as mother
- Pyotr Kolbasin as policeman
- Vitali Konyayev as episode (uncredited)

== Other screen versions ==
In 1972, the director Boris Ravenskikh staged a play by Vasilyev at the Maly Theatre. In 1973 the performance was recorded for television.
