= A Play for a Passenger =

1995 film

- Film poster
- Directed by: Vadim Abdrashitov
- Written by: Aleksandr Mindadze
- Produced by: Sergei Bayev
- Starring: Sergey Makovetskiy; Igor Livanov; Yury Belyayev
- Cinematography: Yuri Nevsky
- Edited by: Roza Rogatkina
- Music by: Viktor Lebedev
- Production companies: Roskomkino; Mosfilm; Ark Film
- Release date: February 1995
- Running time: 103 min.
- Country: Russia
- Language: Russian

A Play for a Passenger (Russian: Пьеса для пассажира, translit. Pyesa dlya passazhira) is a 1995 Russian drama film directed by Vadim Abdrashitov. It was entered into the 45th Berlin International Film Festival where it won the Silver Bear.

It also won the 1996 Sozvezdie Best Actor Award for Igor Livanov.

== Cast ==
- Sergey Makovetskiy as Oleg
- Igor Livanov as Nikolay
- Yury Belyayev as Kuzmin
- Irina Sidorova as Marina
- Nelli Nevedina as Olga
- Yervant Arzumanyan as Ruben, shop owner
- Oksana Mysina as Inna
- Lyubov Germanova as Valentina
- Aleksandra Dorokhina as Lidia
- Natalya Sanzharova as girl in a restaurant
