= Zurab Kipshidze =

Georgian film and theatre actor (born 1953)

Zurab Kipshidze ზურაბ ყიფშიძე (in Georgian)
- Born: 10 August 1953; Tbilisi, Georgian SSR, USSR
- Occupation: Actor
- Years active: 1966 –

Zurab Kipshidze (Georgian: ზურაბ ყიფშიძე; 10 Aug 1953) is a Georgian film and theatre actor. He appeared in 58 films between 1966 and 2009. In 2013 he was a member of the jury at the 35th Moscow International Film Festival.

== Filmography ==
As actor

- Peace! Love! Chewing Gum! (2020-2023)
- Rac Am Kvekhnad Siyvaruli Mephobs (TV Movie) (2013)
- Midioda matarebeli (2005)
- Kidev erti qartuli istoria (2003)
- Antimoz iverieli (2001)
- Misterii (2000)
- Samotkhe chveni qalaqis quchebshi (TV Movie) (2000)
- Dzvirpaso M (TV Movie) (1999)
- Martoobis ordenis kavaleri (1999)
- Time of a Dancer (1998)
- Qaragma (TV Movie) (1997)
- Orpeosis sikvdili (1996)
- Tsarsulis achrdilebi (1995)
- Chakluli suli (1994)
- Expres-Inpormatsia (1994)
- Anas dabadebis dge (TV Movie) (1992)
- Bediani (TV Movie) (1992)
- Oqros oboba (TV Series) (1992)
- Amkhanag Stalinis mogzauroba aprikashi (1991)
- Alka (1990)
- Kedeli (1990)
- Giga, Angel, Snezhok i drugie (1989)
- Martokhela monadire (1989)
- Tsodvis shvilebi (TV Movie) (1989)
- Bravo, Alber Lolish (1987)
- Elisa da Rarus tavgadasavali (1987)
- Argonavtebi (TV Movie) (1986)
- Bagrationi (1985)
- The Legend of Suram Fortress (1985)
- Arsenas Leksi (TV Movie) (1985)
- Neilonis nadzvis khe (1985)
- Voyage of the Young Composer (1985)
- Krosvordis amokhsnis mokvarultatvsis (1981)
- Gza shinisaken (1981)
- Tsinaparta mitsa (1981)
- Matsi Khvitia (1966)
- Tsutisopeli (1971)
