= Children of Iron Gods =

1993 film

- Directed by: Tamás Tóth
- Written by: Pyotr Lutsik; Aleksei Samoryadov
- Starring: Yevgeny Sidikhin
- Cinematography: Sergey Kozlov
- Release dates: 16 April 1993 (Russia); 10 February 1994 (Hungary)
- Running time: 80 minutes
- Countries: Hungary, Russia
- Languages: Hungarian, Russian

Children of Iron Gods (Russian: Дети чугунных богов, translit. Deti chugunnykh bogov, Hungarian: Vasisten gyermekei) is a 1993 Russian-Hungarian drama film directed by Tamás Tóth. It was entered into the 18th Moscow International Film Festival.

== Cast ==
- Yevgeny Sidikhin as Ignat
- Aleksander Kalyagin as Foreman
- Yury Yakovlev as General
- Nikolai Karnaukhov as Old man (as Nikolay Kornaukhov)
- Mikhail Svetin as Fellow sponsor
- Aleksandr Feklistov as Mityai
- Mikhail Golubovich as Nasekin
- Larisa Borodina as Raika
- Yuri Slobodenyuk as Bekbulatka
- Anatoli Mambetov as Bekbulatka's friend
