= Garpastum =

- Directed by: Aleksei German Jr.
- Written by: Oleg Antonov; Aleksei German Jr. Aleksandr Vaynshteyn
- Produced by: Aleksandr Vaynshteyn
- Starring: Yevgeny Pronin; Danila Kozlovsky; Chulpan Khamatova
- Cinematography: Oleg Lukichyov
- Edited by: Ivan Lebedev
- Music by: Igor Vdovin
- Production companies: Lenfilm; VK Company
- Distributed by: Interсinema Art
- Release date: September 11, 2005
- Country: Russia
- Language: Russian

Garpastum (Russian: Гарпастум) is a 2005 Russian drama film written and directed by Aleksei German Jr. It was entered into the main competition at the 62nd edition of the Venice Film Festival.

== Plot ==
The film begins in 1914 on the eve of the outbreak of World War I set during Gavrilo Princip's departure before the assassination of Archduke Franz Ferdinand of Austria.

The main events unfold in St. Petersburg with the story being centered around two brothers, Andrei and Nikolai. In the past, their father was either a sports patron or just interested in football. He put all his money on the Russian football team which lost to the Germans in Stockholm in 1912 with a crushing score of 0:16. He went broke and became insane. Their mother died after some time and the brothers now live in the apartment of their uncle, a doctor, and they are also keen on football. Their team also includes Shust and goalkeeper Misha (whom the brothers nickname as Tolstiy).

Meanwhile Andrei becomes the lover of Anitsa, a young widow who sometime ago came from Belgrade. Anitsa receives famous poets at her home, at one evening it is possible to see Osip Mandelstam, Anna Akhmatova and Vladislav Khodasevich. She is also friends with Alexander Blok, whom Nikolai is also acquainted with.

After reading an ad in a newspaper that the British, who work in St. Petersburg, create their own football teams, the brothers also go for try-outs, but they are not taken in. They dream of building their own football field, and decide to purchase an empty piece of land. Shust makes a deal with the Tartar Torgash, who calls a high price (140 rubles) because he has unpaid debts. To collect the right amount the team of Andrei and Nikolai begins to play football for money with local teams.

In St. Petersburg to Anitsa arrives her sister Vita with a little boy whom she calls her brother (before this, Vita and the boy appear in the scene of the departure of Princip). Vita becomes close to Nikolai and suggests to him to take her as his wife. However when Shust brings Torgash the collected money, Vita and Shust are killed by thugs with whom Torgash is in debt.

Anitsa and Vita's boy leave the city. Nikolai goes to the front. Andrei meets Nina whom he previously courted and marries her. Nikolai arrives from the front when there is famine in Petrograd, which has been renamed. Andrei and Nina live with their child in the apartment of their uncle (who like Nikolai and Andrei's father has already died). Andrei tries to get food at the House of Writers and meets Blok with a pot of potatoes and herring. The brothers go to the wasteland where they wanted to build a field, Nikolai takes out the ball brought from the war, and they begin to play and build new plans.

== Cast ==
- Yevgeny Pronin as Andrei
- Danila Kozlovsky as Nikolai
- Chulpan Khamatova as Anitsa
- Gosha Kutsenko as Alexander Blok
- Anna Banshchikova as Darya
- Iamze Sukhitashvili as Vita
- Pavel Romanov as The Uncle
- Dmitry Vladimirov as Shust
- Aleksandr Bukovski as Tolstiy (Fatty in Russian)
- Sergei Bugaev as Osip Mandelstam
- Dana Agisheva as Nina

== See also ==
- List of association football films
