= The Servant (1989 film) =

1989 film

- Film poster
- Directed by: Vadim Abdrashitov
- Written by: Aleksandr Mindadze
- Starring: Oleg Borisov; Yury Belyayev
- Cinematography: Denis Yevstigneyev
- Music by: Vladimir Dashkevich
- Release date: February 1989
- Running time: 141 minutes
- Country: Soviet Union
- Language: Russian

The Servant (Russian: Слуга, romanized: Sluga) is a 1989 Soviet drama film directed by Vadim Abdrashitov. It was entered into the 39th Berlin International Film Festival where it won the Alfred Bauer Prize and Interfilm Award - Honorable Mention.

== Cast ==
- Oleg Borisov as Andrei Andreyevich Gudionov
- Yury Belyayev as Pavel Sergeyevich Klyuev
- Irina Rozanova as Maria
- Aleksei Petrenko as Roman Romanovich Bryzgin
- Aleksandr Tereshko as Valery
- Larisa Shakhvorostova as Daughter-in-law (as Larisa Totunova)
- Irina Cherichenko as Chorus girl
- Valeri Novikov as Father Vasily
- Mikhail Yanushkevich as watchmaker
- Vyacheslav Zharikov as mechanic
- Felix Antipov as Mikhail
