= Plumbum, or The Dangerous Game =

- Directed by: Vadim Abdrashitov
- Written by: Aleksandr Mindadze
- Starring: Anton Androsov; Yelena Dmitriyeva; Elena Yakovleva
- Cinematography: Georgy Rerberg
- Edited by: Aleksandr Tolkachov
- Music by: Vladimir Dashkevich
- Release date: 1987
- Running time: 97 min
- Country: Soviet Union
- Language: Russian

Plumbum, or The Dangerous Game (Russian: Плюмбум, или опасная игра, "Plyumbum, ili Opasnaya igra") is a 1987 Soviet coming-of-age drama film directed by Vadim Abdrashitov.

The film was entered into the main competition at the 44th edition of the Venice Film Festival, where it received the President of the Italian Senate's Gold Medal.

== Plot ==
One winter evening, members of a citizen patrol burst into a remote cottage where a group of thieves and gamblers are hiding, thanks to fifteen-year-old Ruslan Chutko, known by the nickname "Plumbum" (from Latin plumbum, meaning "lead"). Ruslan has infiltrated the criminals’ circle, earning their trust to help expose them. Soon after, he assists in capturing their accomplice, a hardened criminal named Tkach, at a local restaurant. Although he aspires to join a formal law enforcement squad, his youthful appearance causes officers to dismiss him. At home, he seems like a typical son, singing songs by Bulat Okudzhava with his parents, while his classmate Sonya, who is in love with him, secretly knows he leads a double life. Deeply committed to his self-imposed mission of uncovering crime, Ruslan gathers intel by befriending various unsavory characters. He even manages to infiltrate a gang of vagrants, the "Invisibles," passing their whereabouts to his supervisor, Roman Ivanovich, known as "Grey." Ruslan’s methods grow bolder; through blackmail, he extracts information from a bartender about a ring of counterfeiters. He even sacrifices his own safety to track a group of smugglers, going so far as to throw himself in front of their car to earn a place among them.

In his pursuit of justice, Ruslan manipulates Maria, the girlfriend of one of the smugglers, into giving up information about her partner’s departure with stolen documents to Simferopol, gaining her trust only to betray her confidence to the authorities. Later, he participates in a raid where he captures his own father, an unwitting poacher, without hesitation. As Ruslan becomes more entrenched in his vigilante persona, he assists in dismantling the smuggling gang while wrestling with the fallout of his actions, including Maria's heartbreak. But even as he finds satisfaction in aiding the authorities, his relentless pursuit of justice leads him down darker paths. With Sonya’s help, he tracks down an old foe who once stole his cassette player, chasing the thief across rooftops. When Sonya follows them, she tragically slips, leaving Ruslan to confront the cost of his obsession with retribution.

== Cast ==
- Anton Androsov as Ruslan 'Plyumbum' Chutko
- Yelena Dmitriyeva as Sonya
- Elena Yakovleva as Maria
- Zoya Lirova as Ruslan's mother
- Aleksandr Pashutin as Ruslan's father
- Aleksandr Feklistov as 'Grey-Hair', the Militia commander
- Vladimir Steklov as Lopatov
- Aleksey Zaytsev as Kolya-Oleg
