= Vadim Abdrashitov =

Russian film director (1945–2023)

- Вадим Абдрашитов
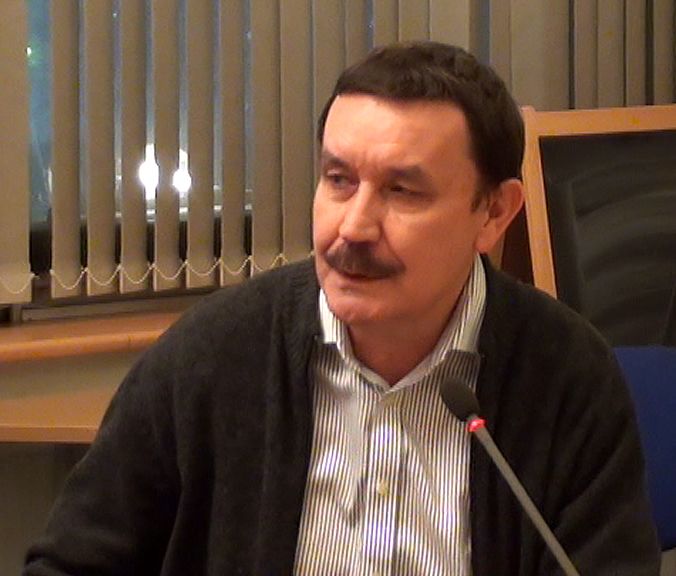
- Abdrashitov in 2012
- Born: 19 January 1945; Kharkov, Ukrainian SSR, Soviet Union
- Died: 12 February 2023 (aged 78); Moscow, Russia
- Resting place: Troyekurovskoye Cemetery
- Occupation: Film director
- Employer: High Courses for Scriptwriters and Film Directors

Vadim Yusupovich Abdrashitov (Russian: Вади́м Юсу́пович Абдраши́тов, Tatar: Вадим Йосыф улы Габдерәшитов, romanized: Wadim Yosıf ulı Ğäbderäşitow; 19 January 1945 – 12 February 2023) was a Russian film director. He was internationally renowned as one of Russian cinema's most notable independent directors, with awards from the Berlin and Venice Film Festivals, and was a People's Artist of Russia.

== Early life and education ==
Abdrashitov was born in Kharkov, in the Ukrainian SSR to a Tatar father and a Russian mother. He moved all over the Soviet Union with his father's military assignments.

Abdrashitov was so impressed with the space flight of the first Russian cosmonaut that he left his parents and moved to Moscow to study nuclear physics at the Moscow Institute of Physics and Technology. Around that time, he developed an interest in amateur filmmaking, and transferred to the Mendeleev University of Chemical Technology because it was equipped with a film studio for students. His cultural and artistic interests developed during the "Thaw".

After graduation as an engineer, he worked as a manager at the Moscow Electric-Vacuum Industry, which was making colour TV tubes.

From 1970 to 1974, Abdrashitov studied film directing at the Moscow Institute of Cinematography (Gerasimov Institute).

== Career ==
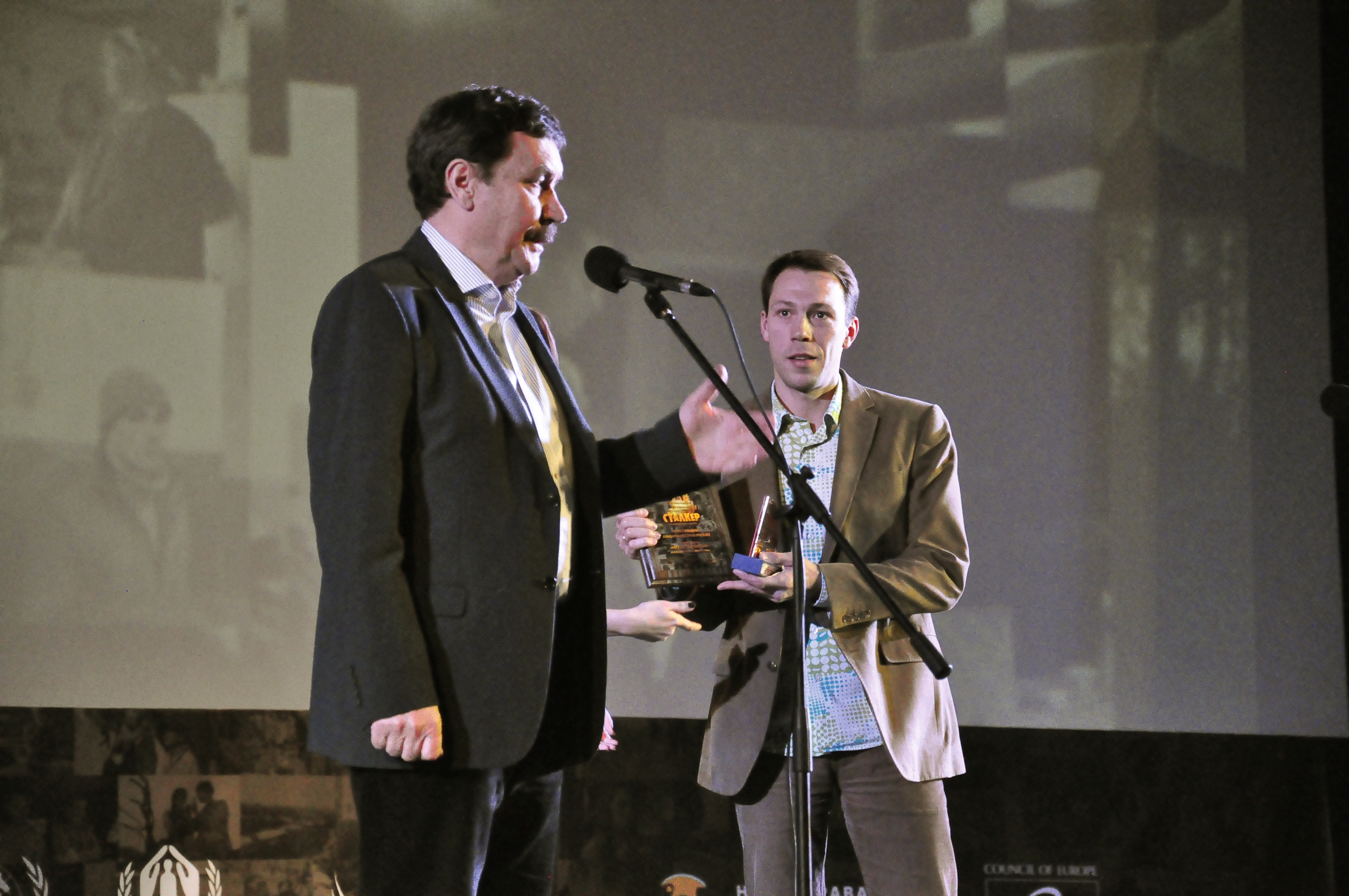
Vadim Abdrashitov and Konstantin Balakirev at Stalker Film Festival, 15 December 2015

Abdrashitov's directorial debut was Stop Potapov! (1974), a satirical comedy based on the screenplay by Grigori Gorin. In 1975 Abdrashitov met with then unknown writer Aleksandr Mindadze, beginning a collaboration that lasted for the next 12 films over 30 years.

His 1997 film Time of a Dancer was shown in the Stalker Human Rights Film Festival's regional presentation in Rostov-on-Don in 2010, where he engaged in discussion with the audience.

== Themes and style ==
Abdrashitov's films are often characterized by protagonists delving into self-exploration. His films have uncomfortable, challenging and intellectual themes; however, the director avoids depiction of graphic violence in all his films. Instead, misery is alluded to in more creative and at times surrealist ways.

== Other roles ==
In 1990, he was a member of the jury at the 40th Berlin International Film Festival.

In 2016, he became a member of the board of trustees for the Fazil Iskander International Literary Award.

Abdrashitov also acted as the president of the Russian Guild of Film Directors and the Stalker Human Rights Film Festival.

== Personal life and death ==
Abdrashitov was married to artist Natella Toidze, a member of the Russian Academy of Arts.

Abdrashitov died on 12 February 2023, at the age of 78, from COVID-19, during the COVID-19 pandemic in Russia.

== Awards and honours ==
- People's Artist of Russia
- 1987: President of the Italian Senate's gold medal at the 44th edition of the Venice Film Festival, for Plumbum, or The Dangerous Game
- 1989: Alfred Bauer Prize at the 39th Berlin International Film Festival, for The Servant
- 1991: USSR State Prize, for The Servant
- 1995: Silver Bear at the 45th Berlin International Film Festival, for A Play for a Passenger
- 1996: Several Nika Awards as well as the Grand Prix at Kinotavr, for Time of a Dancer
- 2003: Nika Award, Best Director for Magnetic Storms

== Selected filmography ==
- Speech for the Defence (1976)
- The Turning Point (1978)
- Fox Hunting (1980)
- The Train Has Stopped (1982)
- Planet Parade (1984)
- Plumbum, or The Dangerous Game (1987)
- The Servant (1989)
- A Play for a Passenger (1995)
- Time of a Dancer (1998)
