= Aleksandr Mindadze =

Russian scriptwriter and director (born 1949)

Alexsandr Mindadze
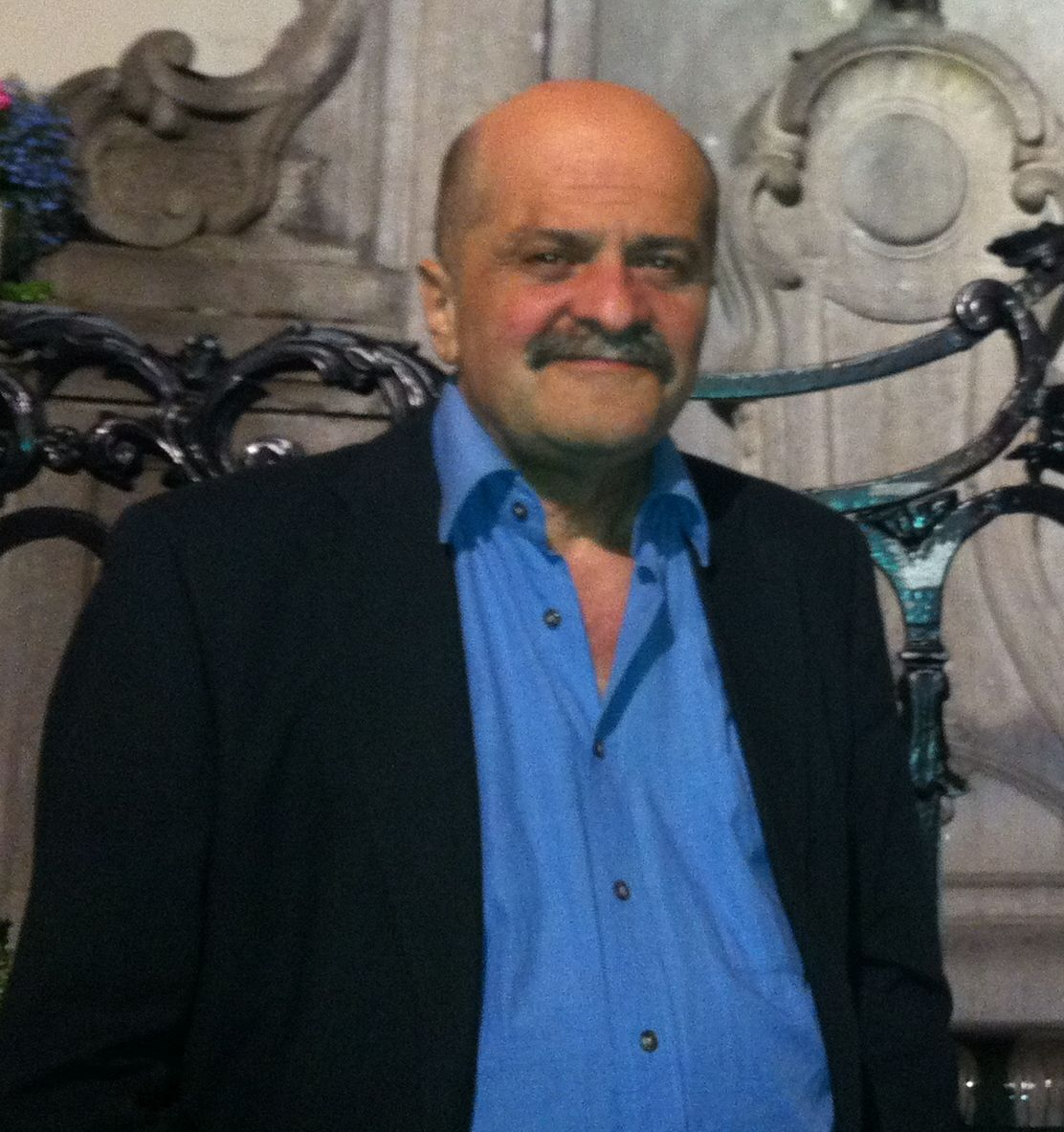
- Born: 28 April 1949 (age 76); Moscow, Soviet Union (now Russia)

Aleksandr Anatolevich Mindadze (Russian: Александр Анатольевич Миндадзе; born 28 April 1949 in Moscow) is a Russian scriptwriter and director. He has won many of the most important Russian and Soviet film awards.

== Selected filmography ==
- Fox Hunting (1980)
- Planet Parade (1984)
- The Train Has Stopped (1982)
- The Servant (1989)
- A Play for a Passenger (1995)
- Dreaming of Space (2005)
