= Nika Award =

Annual national film award in Russia

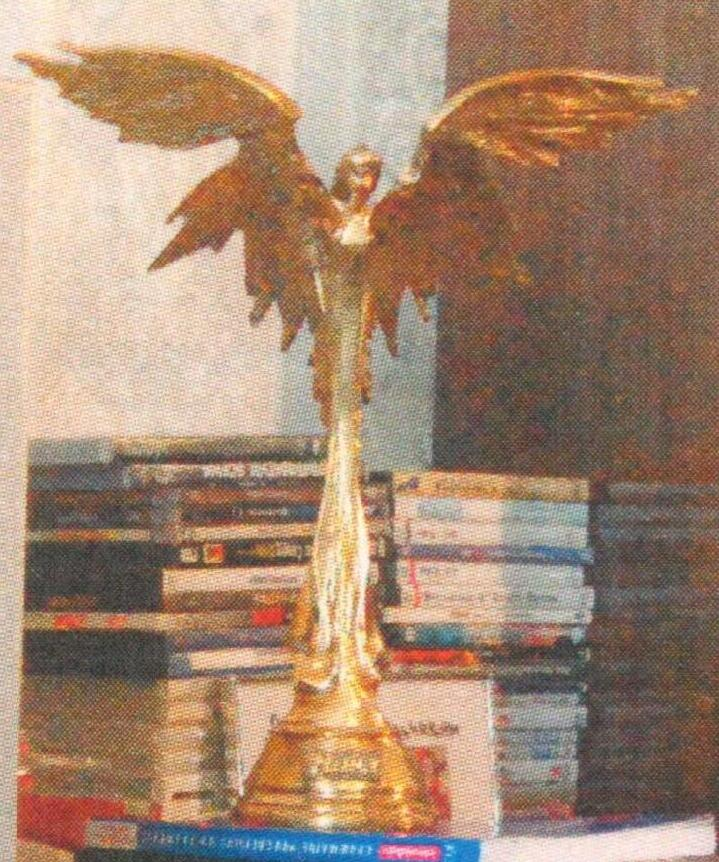
- Nika Award statuette
- Awarded for: Excellence in cinematic achievements
- Country: Russia
- Presented by: Russian Academy of Cinema Arts and Science
- First award: 17 December 1988
- Website: Official site of the Russian Academy of Cinema Arts and Science

The Nika Award (sometimes styled NIKA Award) is the main annual national film award in Russia, presented by the Russian Academy of Cinema Arts and Science, and seen as the national equivalent of the Oscars.

In 2022 nominees were announced, but the award ceremony was postponed and, eventually, cancelled.

The Award ceremony was also cancelled in 2023.

== History ==
The award was established in 1987 in Moscow by Yuli Gusman, and ostensibly modelled on the Oscars. The Russian award takes its name from Nike, the goddess of victory. Accordingly, the prize is modelled after the sculpture Winged Victory of Samothrace.

The oldest professional film award in Russia, the Nika Award was established during the final years of USSR by the influential Russian Union of Filmmakers.

At first the awards were judged by all the members of the Union of Filmmakers. In the early 1990s, a special academy, consisting of over 500 academicians, was elected for distributing the awards, which recognise outstanding achievements in cinema (not television) produced in Russia and the Commonwealth of Independent States.

In 2002 Nikita Mikhalkov established the competing Golden Eagle Award, modelled on the Golden Globe Awards as it honours both film and television production of Russia.

== Description ==
The award name is sometimes styled NIKA Awards.

The Nika Awards ceremony is broadcast annually and attracts huge publicity across Russia and the Commonwealth of Independent States.

== Award categories ==
=== Current categories ===
1. Nika Award for Best Picture: since 1988
2. Nika Award for Best Nonfiction Film: since 1996
3. Nika Award for Best Animation Film: since 1988
4. Nika Award for Best Film of the CIS and Baltic States: since 2003
5. Nika Award for Best Director: since 1988
6. Nika Award for Best Screenplay: since 1988
7. Nika Award for Best Cinematography: since 1988
8. Nika Award for Best Film Editing
9. Nika Award for Best Music: since 1988
10. Nika Award for Best Production Design: since 1988
11. Nika Award for Best Costume Design: since 1988
12. Nika Award for Best Sound: since 1988
13. Nika Award for Best Actor: since 1988
14. Nika Award for Best Actress: since 1988
15. Nika Award for Best Supporting Actor: since 2002
16. Nika Award for Best Supporting Actress: since 2002
17. Nika Award for the Lifetime Achievement Award: since 1988
18. Nika Award "Honor and Dignity": since 1988
19. Nika Award for Discovery of the Year: since 2002
20. Nika Award for Best Contribution to the Cinematic Science, Criticism and Education: since 2002
21. Special Nika Award for Contribution to the National Cinema Award: since 2007
22. Special Nika Award for Creative Achievements in the Art of Television Film: since 2005

=== Retired awards ===
1. Nika Award for Best Supporting Performance (awarded 1988–2001)
2. Nika Award for Best Documentary (awarded 1988–1995)
3. Nika Award for Best Popular Science Film (awarded 1988–1995)
4. Nika Award for Best Producer (awarded 1994–1995)
5. Nika Award for Best Cinematography in Documentary (awarded 1989)
6. Special Nika Award "For Humanism" (awarded once at 2012)

== Films with multiple wins ==
7 wins

- Taurus (2002)
- The Horde (2013)
- Hard to Be a God (2015)
- The Master and Margarita (2025)

6 wins

- Repentance (1988)
- Promised Heaven (1992)
- Prisoner of the Mountains (1997)
- Khrustalyov, My Car! (2000)
- The Island (2007)
- Mongol (2008)
- Once Upon a Time There Lived a Simple Woman (2012)

5 wins

- The Thief (1998)
- Our Own (2005)
- The Geographer Drank His Globe Away (2014)
- Arrhythmia (2018)
- A Frenchman (2020)

== See also ==
- Cinema of Russia
- Cinema of the Soviet Union
- Golden Eagle Award (Russia) selected by the National Academy of Motion Pictures Arts and Sciences of Russia
- List of Russian films
- History of Russian animation
