= Tinatin Dalakishvili =

Georgian actress and model (born 1991)

- თინათინ დალაქიშვილი
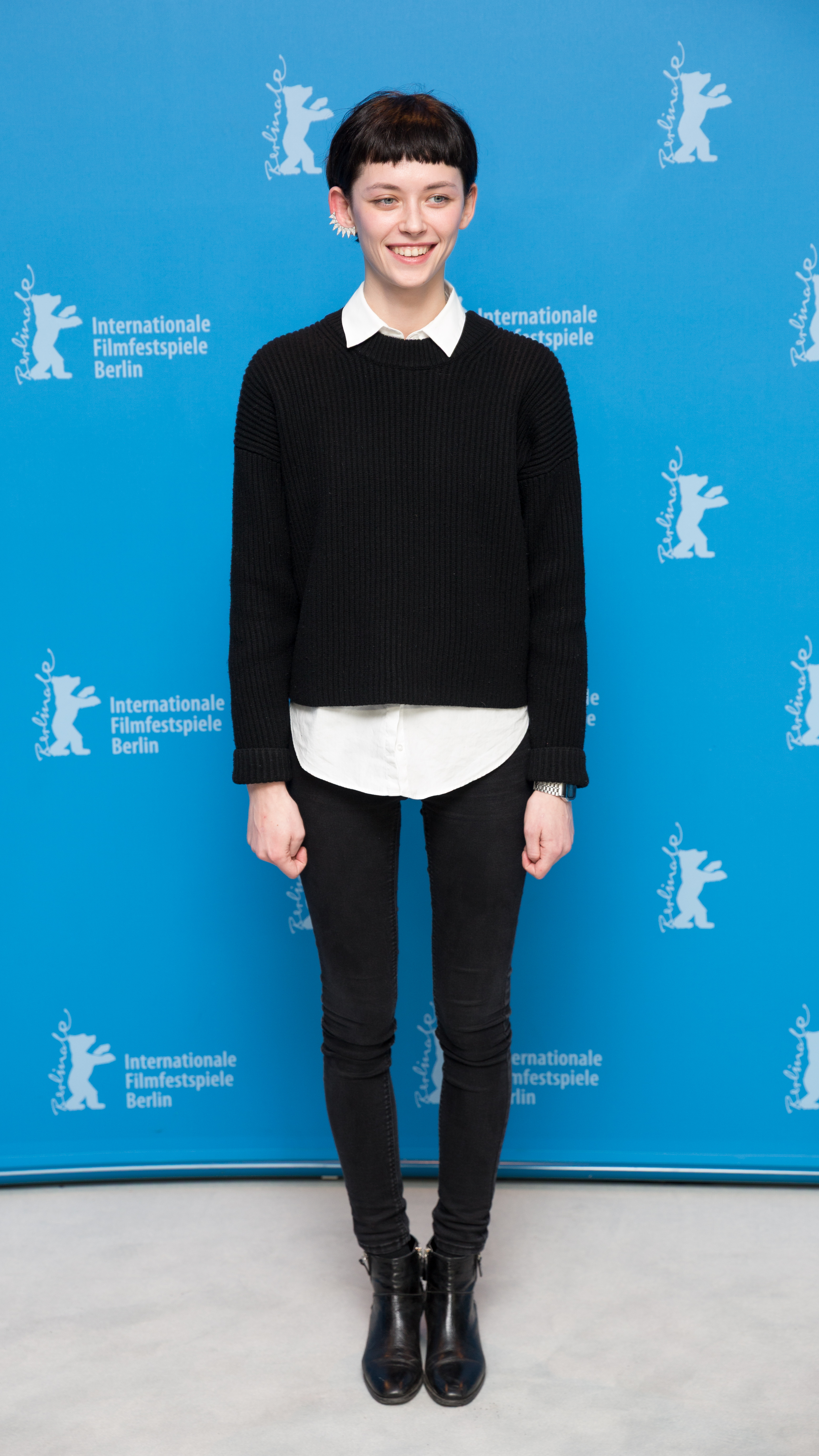
- Born: 2 February 1991 (age 35); Tbilisi, Georgian SSR, Soviet Union
- Occupations: Actress, model
- Years active: 2008–present
- Notable work: Star; Hostages; Abigail
- Awards: Eurasia International Film Festival (2014); Odesa International Film Festival (2014)

Tinatin "Tina" Dalakishvili (Georgian: თინათინ (თინა) დალაქიშვილი; born 2 February 1991) is a Georgian actress and model.

== Early life and education ==
Born on February 2, 1991, in Tbilisi, her name is translated from Georgian as Sunbeam. By profession she is a landscape designer. She has had no acting education.

== Career ==
Dalakishvili debuted in the 2010 feature film thriller Season, directed by Dato Borchkhadze, and in 2012 appeared in the romantic comedy Love with an Accent by Rezo Gigineishvili. Dalakishvili got into the project almost at the last moment, because initially Oksana Akinshina was to play Lesya.

In the film, she was noticed by director Anna Melikian, who personally flew to meet with the young actress in Georgia. She also appeared in Star (2014).

Dalakishvili rose to global fame after appearing in the 2019 English-language sci-fi/fantasy film Abigail, in which Dalakishvili plays the title role. She has also starred in the 2023 action film Extraction 2.

In 2025 Dalakishvili appeared in the short film Extremist by Aleksandr Molochnikov.

== Personal life ==
Since 2019, Tinatin lives with her partner Nikusha Antadze.

== Filmography ==
- Love with an Accent (2012)
- Irandam Ulagam (2013)
- Tbilisi, I Love You (2014)
- Star (2014)
- Hostages (2017)
- About Love. For Adults Only (2017)
- Yana+Yanko (2017)
- Abigail (2019)
- Fairy (2020)
- Let It Snow (2020)
- Medea (2021)
- Extraction 2 (2023)
- Extremist (2025)
