= About Love. For Adults Only =

2017 Russian film by Rezo Gigineishvili

- Directed by: Rezo Gigineishvili; Anna Melikian; Pavel Ruminov; Nigina Sayfullaeva; Yevgeny Shelyakin; Alexey Chupov; Natalya Merkulova
- Written by: Aleksey Chupov; Roman Kantor; Anna Melikian; Natalya Merkulova; Lyubov Mulmenko; Pavel Ruminov; Nigina Sayfullaeva; Yevgeny Shelyakin; Aleksandr Tsypkin
- Produced by: Oleg Kirichenko; Anna Melikian; Natalya Poklad
- Starring: Anna Banshchikova; Maksim Matveyev; Fedor Bondarchuk; Gosha Kutsenko; Tinatin Dalakishvili; John Malkovich
- Cinematography: Mark Ziselson
- Edited by: Mikhail Igonin
- Production company: Magnum
- Release date: August 31, 2017 (Russia)
- Running time: 108 min.
- Country: Russia
- Language: Russian

About Love. For Adults Only (Russian: Про любовь. Только для взрослых, romanized: Pro lyubov. Tolko dlya vzroslykh) is a 2017 Russian sex comedy anthology film. The film took part in the main competitive program of the film festival Kinotavr 2017.

== Plot ==
The film takes place in Moscow in the summer. The city lives its own life, something happens here every day. People who are in a hurry for their important affairs, and also do not forget about the acquisition of new knowledge and skills. To do this, each person can take the necessary courses, lectures and trainings on the topic of interest. And the theme of this film is love. Characters ordinary people, lost in Moscow, each of which has its own love story.

== Cast ==
- Anna Banshchikova as Yelena
- Maksim Matveyev as Nikita Orlov
- Fedor Bondarchuk as Igor
- Aleksandra Bortich as Girl With A Question About Cheating
- Tinatin Dalakishvili as Tanya
- Ingeborga Dapkūnaitė as Liz
- Anna Mikhalkovaas Vera
- Lukerya Ilyashenko as Masha
- Viktoriya Isakova as Nina
- Gosha Kutsenko as Aleksei
- Gleb Kalyuzhny as Mitya
- John Malkovich as Ed, The Lecturer
- Aleksandr Pal as Viktor, The DJ
- Ravshana Kurkova as Policewoman
- Yevgeny Tsyganov as Passer
- Yuliya Snigir as Episode
- Mariya Shalayeva as Cafe Owner
- Yuri Kolokolnikov as Episode
- Bi-2 as Cameo
- Keti Topuria as Cameo
