= Severija Janušauskaitė =

Lithuanian actress (born 1981)

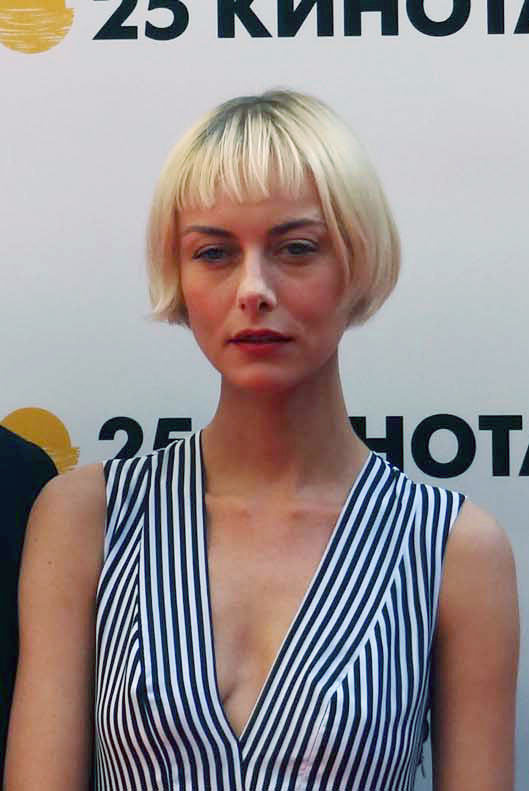
- Janušauskaitė in 2014
- Born: 22 October 1981 (age 44); Šiauliai, Lithuanian SSR, Soviet Union
- Occupation: Actress
- Years active: 2003–present
- Awards: Kinotavr (2014); Golden Eagle (2015)

Severija Janušauskaitė (born 22 October 1981) is a Lithuanian stage and film actress, occasionally performing as a singer, composer, costume designer and fashion model. She is well known for her role in the drama film Star (2014), for which she received an Award for Best Actress at the Kinotavr Film Festival, a Golden Eagle Award for Best Supporting Actress as well as Nika Award and White Elephant Award nominations in several categories. Other popular works include the comedy film The Norseman (2015) as well as the TV series The Optimists and Babylon Berlin (both 2017).

== Early life ==
Severija Janušauskaitė was born on 22 October 1981 in Šiauliai. Her mother is a teacher and her father is a power engineer. She has a sister working as an intellectual property lawyer, currently at the trade association representing the recording industry.

Janušauskaitė showed interest in arts already as a child, taking example from her grandfather, a multi-instrumentalist. Later on, she studied music and graduated from a fine arts school. Finally, she chose a theatre and film study program and graduated from the Lithuanian Academy of Music and Theatre in 2005.

== Career ==
Since 2003, Janušauskaitė has performed at several Lithuanian theatres, such as the State Youth Theatre of Lithuania, Oskaras Koršunovas Theatre (OKT), VDU / Mens Publica Theatre, and Lėlė (Vilnius Puppet Theatre), as well as the Arts Printing House, a creative space in Vilnius.

After being selected in an open competition, Janušauskaitė was hired in 2006 to play her first major stage role in Woman from the Past, based on a play by Roland Schimmelpfennig. One year later, she played the role of Queen Margaret in Ivona, Princess of Burgundia, accepting an offer by Jonas Vaitkus, her postgraduate studies professor. For her role of Liucija in the drama Patriots at the Lithuanian State Youth Theatre, in 2008 Severija Janušauskaitė was nominated for the Golden Stage Cross, the highest theatre award of Lithuania. She later played other main characters, such as Barbara in Barbara and Sigismund and Elisabet Vogler in an adaptation of Ingmar Bergman's film Persona. The actress was awarded a Fortune Diploma and a Young Theatre Critics Award in 2013 for her portrayal of Lulu in Intimacy at VDU Theatre.

Janušauskaitė started her film career in 2004 with the short film The Flame. Later, she appeared in two TV series, War and Peace (2007), an international co-production, and the Norwegian Honeytrap (2008). Her first feature film was the Lithuanian-Hungarian ironic drama Anarchy Girls (2010), where she played one of the main roles. This film, directed by Saulius Drunga, won the Silver George Award for the best film in the Perspectives competition at the 33rd Moscow International Film Festival. Its screenplay received the New Talent Award at the Cannes Film Festival in 2007.

Janušauskaitė gained popularity in Russia and abroad for her role in Anna Melikian's film Star (2014). Her performance of socialite Margarita was highly praised by film critics, resulting in the Best Actress Award at the 25th Sochi Open Russian Film Festival (2014), a Golden Eagle Award for Best Supporting Actress (2015) as well as Nika Award and White Elephant Award nominations in the categories Best Actress and Discovery of the Year (both 2015). Following the success in Sochi, Severija Janušauskaitė participated as a jury member in the 15th Tbilisi International Film Festival.

The following years were characterized by growing critical and public acclaim. In 2013 and 2015, Janušauskaitė was nominated for the Best Lithuanian Actress Award at Vilnius International Film Festival. Her performances in the TV series Godfather (2014) and films such as The Norseman (2015) and Dreamfish (2016) were also widely covered by the news media. The latter film participated in the competition of the 27th Kinotavr Film Festival in Sochi and was nominated for the Russian Guild of Film Critics Award in the category Best Debut Film (2016). For her role of the mermaid Helena in Dreamfish, Janušauskaitė received the Best Actress Award at the 25th Honfleur Russian Film Festival. She was nominated for the national film award of Lithuania, the Silver Crane, in 2017 in the category Best Supporting Actress for her role in the historical drama film Emilia (2016).

In 2017, Janušauskaitė became known to a broad audience in Russia and Germany thanks to her roles in major television films. In Russia, the actress is currently widely associated with her performance as Ruta Blaumane, chief of an analytical group in the Soviet Ministry of Foreign Affairs in the 1960s, in Alexey Popogrebsky's historical drama The Optimists screened on Russia-1 TV channel in April. In Germany, Janušauskaitė is known for her role as double agent Svetlana Sorokina in another period drama set in 1920s Berlin, Tom Tykwer's Babylon Berlin that had its premiere in October on Sky 1. In this to date most expensive German TV series, the actress also appears as the singer Nikoros and performs inter alia the film's main theme, Zu Asche, Zu Staub, released under the pseudonym Severija. In October 2018, after the series started to air on free TV, the song became the most popular song in Germany's Amazon and iTunes download charts. She considers the role in Babylon Berlin as her most memorable one so far.

Janušauskaitė has many interests and does not work solely as an actress. She wrote music for the children's theatre performances The Little Match Girl (at Arts Printing House) and Evolution, designed costumes for Now You See It / Now You Don't (both at Vilnius Puppet Theatre). Apart from that, she also appears as a fashion model.

== Personal life ==
Janušauskaitė likes singing and plays piano. Her hobbies also include reading, painting, sewing, dancing, yoga, swimming, fencing and make-up design. Besides Lithuanian, she speaks English, German and Russian. She is married to the director of the Vilnius Puppet Theatre and has a son from her first marriage.

"I can say one thing about my private life: I am not a sociable person. I live a closed life and do not allow anyone to stick their nose into it."

— Severija Janušauskaitė

== Works ==
=== Theatre ===
Premiere	English Title	Original Title	Role	Venue
2006	Woman from the Past	Moteris iš praeities	Romi	Arts Printing House, Vilnius
2007	Ivona, Princess of Burgundia	Ivona, Burgundo kunigaikštytė	Queen Margaret	State Youth Theatre of Lithuania, Vilnius
2008	Ferryman	Keltininkas	Beatričė	Vilnius City Theatre / OKT
2008	Patriots	Patriotai	Liucija	State Youth Theatre of Lithuania, Vilnius
2010	Barbara and Sigismund	Barbora ir Žygimantas	Barbora	State Youth Theatre of Lithuania, Vilnius
2011	Persona	Persona	Elisabet Vogler	Arts Printing House, Vilnius
2013	Intimacy	Intymumas	Lulu	VMU Theatre & Mens Publica Theatre, Kaunas
2014	The Little Match Girl	Mergaitė su degtukais	[composer]	Arts Printing House, Vilnius
2015	Evolution	Evoliucija	[composer]	Vilnius Puppet Theatre
2016	Now You See It / Now You Don't	Čia buvo / Čia nėra	[costume designer]	Vilnius Puppet Theatre

=== Film ===
Year	English Title	Original Title	Role	Notes
2004	The Flame		woman	short film
2006	No Focus	Nefokuse	smoking girl	short film
2007	War and Peace	Война и мир	gipsy dancer and singer	TV series
2008	Honeytrap	Honningfellen	Vaida Balandytė	TV series
2009	The Other Side of the Wall	Les dernières heures du mur	Marlene	
2010	2h_Two Hours	2h_Dvi valandos	Agnija	short film
2010	Anarchy Girls	Anarchija Žirmūnuose	Sandra	
2010	I Love The Bullet In Your Heart	Myliu kulką tavo širdyje	Laura	
2010	Laima Determines the Destiny	Taip Laima lėmė		voice role
2011	The Crown Jewels	Kronjuvelerna	prison guard	
2011	The Fortress of Sleeping Butterflies	Miegančių drugelių tvirtovė	Silvija	
2012	Comma	Komats	actress	short film
2012	Experman	Expermenas	Lucy	short film
2012	Letters to Sofija	Laiškai Sofijai	Helen	
2012	Reeba	Ryba		short film
2013	Violence	Smurtas	Julie	short film
2014	Godfather	Крёстный	Kristin	TV series
2014	Star	Звезда	Margarita	
2014	Sugar Time	Zuckerzeit		announced
2015	Chasing Solace		Lina	short film
2015	Until No	Пока нет		short film
2015	The Exact Address	Точный адрес		short film
2015	The Norseman	Норвег	Brynhild	
2015	Sinickis - Juokas pro ašaras	Sinickis - Juokas pro ašaras		music video
2015	The Roop - Be Mine	The Roop - Be Mine		music video
2016	About Football and Angels	О футболе и про ангелов	angel	short film
2016	Dreamfish	Рыба-мечта	Helena	
2016	Emilia	Emilija iš Laisvės alėjos	actress	
2017	The Optimists	Оптимисты	Ruta Blaumane	TV series
2017	Babylon Berlin	Babylon Berlin	Swetlana Sorokina / Nikoros	TV series
2018	Motherland	Gimtinė	Viktorija	
2018	Isaac	Izaokas	Elena	
2018	What Silent Gerda Knows	Ko zina klusā Gerda	Baroness Emma	
2018	Unburied	Nepalaidotas	Eglė	short film
2018	Short Waves	Короткие волны		
2018	Bloody Lady	Кровавая барыня	Catherine II	TV series
2018	Polina	Поліна	Varvara	
2018	Mermaids	Русалки	Ulyana	TV series
2018	Selfie	Селфи	Lera	
2018	Sleepers (season 2)	Спящие (season 2)	Ingrid Watson	TV series
2018	A Rough Draft	Черновик	Renata Ivanova	TV series
2020	The Silver Skates	Серебряные коньки	Severina	
2022	The Playlist		Maxine Silverson	TV miniseries

=== Dubbing ===
Year	English Title	Local Title	Role
2007	Ratatouille	La Troškinys	Colette Tatou
2007	The Simpsons Movie	Simpsonų filmas	Bart Simpson
2007	Shrek the Third	Šrekas 3	Rapunzel

== Accolades ==
Year	Association	Category	Work	Result	Ref.
2008	Golden Cross of the Stage	Best Supporting Actress	Patriots (State Youth Theatre of Lithuania, Vilnius)	Nominated	
2013	Fortune	Fortune Diploma	Intimacy (Mens Publica Theatre, Kaunas)	Won	
2013	Fortune	Young Theatre Critics Award	Intimacy (VDU Theatre, Kaunas)	Won	
2013	Vilnius International Film Festival	Best Lithuanian Actress	—N/a	Nominated	
2014	Sochi Open Russian Film Festival	Best Actress	Star	Won	
2015	Golden Eagle Award	Best Supporting Actress	Star	Won	
2015	Nika Award	Best Actress	Star	Nominated	
2015	Nika Award	Discovery of the Year	Star	Nominated	
2015	White Elephant Award	Best Actress	Star	Nominated	
2015	Vilnius International Film Festival	Best Lithuanian Actress	—N/a	Nominated	
2016	Honfleur Russian Film Festival	Best Actress	Dreamfish	Won	
2017	Silver Crane Award	Best Supporting Actress	Emilia	Nominated	
