= Aleksandra Bortich =

Belarusian-born Russian actress

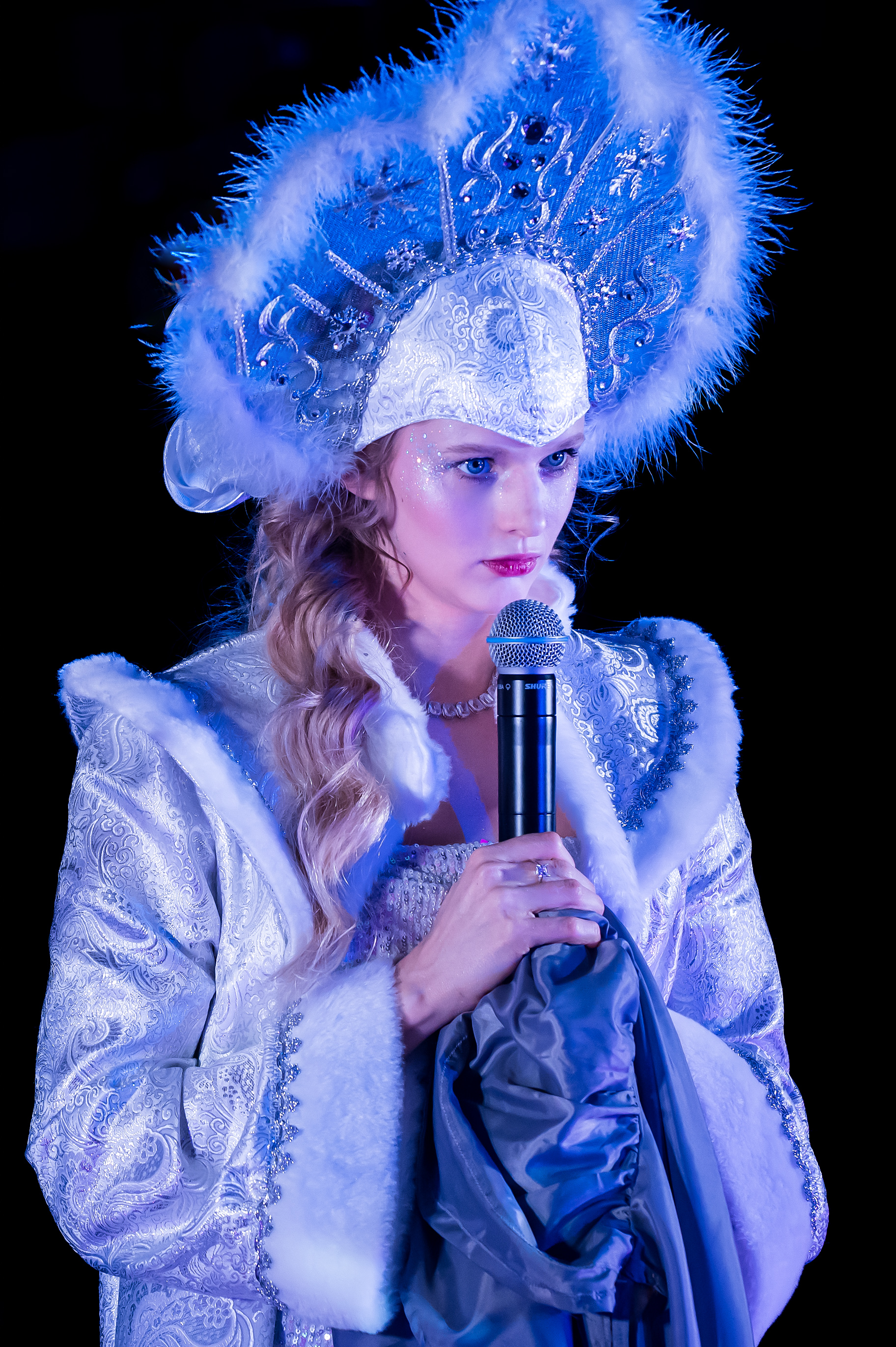
- Born: 24 September 1994 (age 32); Svietlahorsk, Gomel Region, Belarus
- Occupation: actress
- Years active: 2014–present
- Spouse: Vyacheslav Vorontsov (m. 2016; div. 2018) Evgeny Savelev (m. 2021; div. 2023)
- Children: 1

Aleksandra Nikolaevna Bortich (Belarusian: Аляксандра Мікалаеўна Борціч, also tr. Aliaksandra Mikalaeuna Bortsich; Russian: Александра Николаевна Бортич; born 24 September 1994) is a Belarusian-born Russian actress known for her roles in Dukhless 2 (2015), Viking (2016) and I Am Losing Weight (2018).

== Early life ==
Bortich was born in Svietlahorsk, Svietlahorsk District, Gomel Region, Belarus. Her parents divorced when Bortich was still very young. She moved with her mother to the city of Grodno. She finished school in Moscow. In her childhood, she studied at the music school, played on different instruments, in particular, on the saxophone.

In the tenth grade, Bortich went to the theater studio at the Pioneers Palace. It was there that she realized that she wanted to become an actress. However, she failed to enter the theater institute. Then, she went to study in a pedagogical university, which she ended up leaving very soon.

She worked as a waitress in a bar for almost a year. In parallel with work, she auditioned for roles in various television series.

== Acting career ==
Bortich's rise began with a campaign for the casting of the series Babes & Chicks (2012), where she was noticed by director Nigina Sayfullaeva who invited her for the role of Sasha in the film Name Me (2014).

In 2014, as a result of the competitive selection of young performers, she received a major role in the psychological drama Name Me (2014) by Nigina Sayfullaeva. The film received the main prize at the 11th International Film Festival "Baltic Debuts" in Svetlogorsk, Kaliningrad Oblast and a special prize "For Light Breath and Artistic Integrity" at the 25th Russian Open Film Festival Kinotavr in Sochi. The film was shown at the 20th "Stalker" International Human Rights Film Festival in Moscow and at the San Sebastian International Film Festival in San Sebastián, Spain.

She played in the 2015 film About Love by Anna Melikian, which gave her increased recognition among the public. The picture received the main prize of the 26th Kinotavr Festival.

Bortich played in the film The Elusive (2015), in it she had to ride around Moscow naked on a horse. She also starred in the sequel, The Elusive: Jackpot, which was released in 2016.

In 2016, Bortich played Rogneda in the historical action film Viking. In the same year, she acted in the series Police from Rublyovka. Also, the audience saw her in the series Jackal (2016) – the continuation of the popular trilogy of the series Mosgaz (2012), Executioner (2014),

She played the lead role in the 2018 comedy film I am Losing Weight, for the role she had to gain and lose 20 kg over the making of the film.

She appears in Serj Tankian's 2021 music video "Elasticity".

== Personal life ==
Bortich was in a relationship with Russian actor Ilya Malanin. They met on the set of the film The Elusive (2015). At the end of 2016, Bortich and Malanin parted ways.

In 2016, she married rap singer Vyacheslav Vorontsov; in 2018, the marriage ended in divorce.

Starting from 2019, Bortich was in a relationship with Evgeny Savelev. They had a son, Alexander Savelev, born in summer 2020 during the COVID-19 pandemic. They married in 2021 and divorced in 2023.

On January 21, 2021, Bortich expressed her support for the opposition politician Alexei Navalny, who had been arrested and sent to a pre-trial detention center the day before. In a video posted on Navalny's YouTube channel, Bortich stated that the situation surrounding Navalny's arrest affected all Russian citizens, regardless of their personal opinions, as "we are being shown that our laws, such as the Constitution and the Criminal Code, are mere pieces of paper, and that anyone can be treated as they see fit". This statement drew criticism from Nikita Mikhalkov.

== In media ==
According to the film portal Kinopoisk, Bortich was the most popular actress of the year 2017. She was also named Woman of the Year by the Russian edition of Glamour in 2018.

== Filmography ==
=== Film ===
| Year | Title | Role | Notes |
|---|---|---|---|
| 2014 | Name Me | Sasha | |
| 2015 | Dukhless 2 | Alyona Smirnova | |
| 2015 | The Elusive | Kira | (ru) |
| 2015 | About Love | Sasha | |
| 2015 | The Elusive: Last Hero | Kira | (ru) |
| 2016 | The Elusive: Jackpot | Kira | (ru) |
| 2016 | Viking | Rogneda Rogvolodovna | |
| 2017 | About Love. For Adults Only | | |
| 2017 | Light Up! | Zhenya | |
| 2018 | I Am Losing Weight | Anna "Anya" Kulikova | |
| 2018 | The Soul Conductor | Katya Kaluzhskikh | |
| 2018 | Policeman from Rublyovka. New Year Mayhem | Nika | |
| 2019 | Mistresses | Alisa | |
| 2019 | Billion | Lyudmila "Lyuda" | |
| 2019 | Serf | Elizaveta "Liza" | |
| 2021 | House Arrest | Ira | |
| 2022 | Who's There? | mother | |
| 2023 | Dance, Herring! | Zhanna | |
| 2025 | Happy when You're Not | Yevgenia | |

=== Television ===
| Year | Title | Role | Notes |
|---|---|---|---|
| 2016—2018 | Policeman from Rublyovka | Nika | (ru) |
| 2016 | Jackal | Nyura Gorbatova | (ru) |
| 2016 | To marry Pushkin | Lena Sazonova | |
| 2017 | Philfac | Lena Osokina | |
| 2017 | You All Infuriate Me | Sveta | |
| 2017 | Pets | Alisa | |
| 2018—2021 | An Ordinary Woman | Zhenya | (ru) |
| 2023 | Fisher | Natalya Dobrovolskaya | |
