= The Soul Conductor =

2018 film directed by Ilya Maksimov

- Film poster
- Directed by: Ilya Maksimov
- Written by: Anna Kurbatova; Aleksandr Topuriya
- Produced by: Mikhail Kurbatov; Anna Kurbatova; Grigoriy Podzemelnyy; Dmitriy Fiks; Sergey Fiks; Artem Chuba
- Starring: Aleksandra Bortich; Yevgeny Tsyganov; Aleksandr Robak; Vyacheslav Razbegaev; Vladimir Yaglych
- Cinematography: Yuri Bekhterev; Dmitriy Kuvshinov
- Edited by: Nick Akhayan
- Music by: Denis Surov
- Production companies: Real Dakota; Motor! Film Studio; Propeller Prodakshn
- Distributed by: 20th Century Fox CIS
- Release date: 29 November 2018
- Running time: 89 minutes
- Country: Russia
- Language: Russian
- Budget: 72 million rubles

The Soul Conductor (Russian: Проводник, romanized: Provodnik) is a 2018 Russian dark fantasy film directed by Ilya Maksimov and starring Aleksandra Bortich, Yevgeny Tsyganov, Aleksandr Robak, Vyacheslav Razbegaev and Vladimir Yaglych.

The film was released in Russia on November 29, 2018 by 20th Century Fox CIS.

== Plot ==
Katya has a mystical gift, she sees ghosts. When her twin sister disappears, the girl alone rushes in search. The police insist that the sister does not exist at all, that she is the fruit of Katya's sick imagination. However, during the search for her sister, Katya understands that a serial maniac is operating in town, and her sister is one of his victims. There is still hope to save her, but in a gloomy, mystery-filled city you cannot trust anyone, even yourself.

== Cast ==
- Aleksandra Bortich as Katya Kaluzhskikh / Larisa Kaluzhskikh
  - Martha Timofeeva as Katya, a little girl
- Yevgeny Tsyganov as Kapkov, the investigator
- Aleksandr Robak as Vasya, the ghost
- Vyacheslav Razbegaev as Pavel Laktin
- Vladimir Yaglych as Anton Morozov
- Ekaterina Rokotova as Bella, the ghost
- Vasily Bochkaryov as San Sanych
- Sergey Gorobchenko as Katya's dad
- Mariya Malinovskaya as Katya's mom
- Ekaterina Vulichenko as Alisa
- Anastasiya Mikhaylova as Alla
- Aleksandra Tulinova as Vera

== Production ==
The Soul Conductor was shot almost completely without the use of special effects. Actors performed tricks without doubles. The interior of the main house of the Znamenskoye-Sadki manor was to be greatly changed: all the walls were completely repainted and set, the windows were boarded up, many interior items appeared, a whole corridor was created, which was then burned down during a fire scenario.
