= Star (2014 film) =

- Directed by: Anna Melikian
- Written by: Anna Melikian; Andrey Migachev; Victoria Bugayeva
- Produced by: Ruben Dishdishyan; Anna Melikian
- Starring: Tinatin Dalakishvili; Severija Janušauskaitė
- Cinematography: Alisher Khamidkhodzhaev
- Edited by: Dasha Danilova; Pavel Ruminov
- Music by: Igor Vdovin; Alina Orlova; Anna Drubich; Alexey Arkhipovsky
- Production companies: Mars Media Entertainment; Magnum Film Studio
- Release date: 18 June 2014 (Kinotavr)
- Running time: 128 min
- Country: Russia
- Language: Russian

Star (Russian: Звезда, romanized: Zvezda) is a 2014 Russian comedy-drama film directed by Anna Melikian.

== Plot ==
Young Masha desperately wants to become a star, she saves money for plastic surgery to enlarge her breasts and lips, and in parallel, persistently goes to castings and looks after a lonely old man to earn money. Mature Rita is the lover of the deputy minister, who wants to become pregnant and marry him. Kostya is the son of a deputy minister, who is constantly in conflict with his father and Rita, but falls in love with Masha when he meets her.

After quarreling, Rita is forced to leave her lover's house, and meets Masha by chance.

== Cast ==
- Tinatin Dalakishvili as Masha
- Severija Janušauskaitė as Rita
- Pavel Tabakov as Kostya
- Andrey Smolyakov as Sergey Vladimirovich
- Juozas Budraitis as old man

== Awards ==
- Kinotavr:
  - Best Director (Anna Melikian)
  - Best Actress (Severija Janušauskaitė)
- V Odesa International Film Festival:
  - Special Jury Prize (Tinatin Dalakishvili)
- Golden Eagle Award:
  - Best Supporting Actress (Severija Janušauskaitė)
