= Useful idiot (disambiguation) =

Useful idiot is a political term for naive supporters of a cause who are taken advantage of.

Useful Idiot or Useful Idiots may also refer to:

- "Useful Idiot" (Homeland), an episode of the television series Homeland
- Useful Idiots (podcast), a podcast hosted by Aaron Maté and Katie Halper
- "Useful Idiot", a song by band Tool from their 1996 album Ænima
- Useful Idiots, a 2004 novel by Jan Mark
- Useful Idiots: How Liberals Got It Wrong in the Cold War and Still Blame America First, a 2003 book by Mona Charen
