= Who's There? =

2022 Russian thriller film

Who’s There?
- Directed by: Vladimir Maslov; Vitali Dudka; Mikhail Morskov
- Written by: Vitali Dudka; Mikhail Morskov; Goga Poberezhnyy; Mikhail Sokolovsky
- Produced by: Vadim Vereshchagin; Vladimir Maslov; Mikhail Morskov
- Starring: Vladimir Mashkov; Aleksandra Bortich; Kirill Käro; Tikhon Zhiznevsky; Aleksandr Samoylenko
- Cinematography: Andrey Danelyan; Vasili Grigolyunas
- Music by: Artyom Fedotov
- Production companies: Central Partnership Film Company; Dudka Films; Neopoleon Studio; Zoom Production
- Distributed by: Central Partnership
- Release date: September 15, 2022 (Russia)
- Running time: 80 min.
- Country: Russia
- Language: Russian

Who’s There? (Russian: Кто там?, romanized: Kto tam?) is a 2022 Russian thriller film directed by Vladimir Maslov, Vitaly Dudka and Mikhail Morskov. Dudka and Morskov are also screenwriters, along with Mikhail Sokolovsky and Goga Poberezhnyy. This film was theatrically released on September 15, 2022 by Central Partnership.

== Plot ==
The film tells about a billionaire, an airplane pilot, an aspiring police officer and a young woman with her daughter, who are forced to face the unknown and understand themselves in order to realize what their fears are.

== Cast ==
- Vladimir Mashkov as Pavel
- Aleksandra Bortich as mother
- Kirill Käro as Pyotr
- Tikhon Zhiznevsky as Malinin
- Aleksandr Samoylenko as Sergeyich
- Aleksandr Oblasov as Dymov
- Pelageya Nevzorova as Katya
- Maryana Spivak as mother
- Nikolai Kovbas as businessman
- Jia Lissa as girl in love

== Production ==
Filming wrapped in June 2022. Specialists from Dudka Films, Zoom Production and Neopoleon Studio worked on it, and Central Partnership is the distributor.

The locations were Moscow, as well as the Urban-type settlement of Bolshaya Izhora, which is located in the Leningrad Oblast. The main difficulty, according to the creators, was to shoot everything planned in a single take. This created the effect of complete immersion.
