= Clarity (Homeland) =

- Homeland episode
- Episode no.: Season 7 Episode 10
- Directed by: Dan Attias
- Written by: Howard Gordon; Ron Nyswaner
- Production code: 7WAH10
- Original air date: April 15, 2018
- Running time: 60 minutes

Guest appearances
- James D'Arcy as Thomas Anson; Amy Hargreaves as Maggie Mathison; Dylan Baker as Senator Sam Paley; Catherine Curtin as Sandy Langmore; Adrienne C. Moore as Rhonda; Francesca Faridany as Olivia; Sakina Jaffrey as Dr. Meyer; Mackenzie Astin as Bill Dunn; Courtney Grosbeck as Josie Mathison-Dunn; Damian Young as Jim; Marin Hinkle as Christine Lonas; Tricia Paoluccio as Audrey Navarro; Thomas Schall as Madison Bell; Beau Bridges as Vice President Ralph Warner

Episode chronology
← Previous "Useful Idiot"	Next → "All In"
- Homeland season 7

"Clarity" is the tenth episode of the seventh season of the American television drama series Homeland, and the 82nd episode overall. It premiered on Showtime on April 15, 2018.

== Plot ==
With Dante's death confirmed, the chain of evidence to vindicate President Keane falls apart. To salvage the situation, Saul's (Mandy Patinkin) plan is to exfiltrate Simone Martin from Russia. He makes a plea to Carrie (Claire Danes), asking her to lead a team of operatives to carry out the mission. Carrie declines, as she faces a custody hearing and needs to put that type of work behind her. Her lawyer, Rhonda (Adrienne C. Moore), urges her to consider a temporary custody arrangement that allows her to visit Franny every third weekend in order to avoid the hearing, but Carrie refuses. Carrie gets a visit from Anson (James D'Arcy). They discuss the upcoming hearing and how to weaken Maggie's case. Carrie notes that Maggie used to illegally treat Carrie's bipolar disorder by supplying medication and administering blood tests. Anson breaks into Maggie's office, procures the corresponding medical records, and delivers them to Carrie.

President Keane (Elizabeth Marvel) faces an uprising from her Cabinet, who are pushing to collect enough votes to invoke the 25th Amendment and remove her from office. Only Vice President Warner's (Beau Bridges) signature is needed to complete the process. Senator Paley (Dylan Baker) meets with Warner to make his case against Keane. Keane learns of the meeting and fears the worst when she is unable to contact Warner afterwards. She goes on the offensive, firing four of the Cabinet members she suspects betrayed her so they cannot vote against her. Wellington (Linus Roache) unsuccessfully tries to dissuade her, telling her it would be political suicide, and exactly the type of crisis the Russians were trying to engender. After news of the firing goes public, Warner informs her that, after giving it thought, he never signed the document already signed by the majority of the cabinet members. He insists that she reverse course and not go through with dismissing her Cabinet members. Keane refuses, stating that because of his actions, she does not trust him and suspects he plans to sign the document anyway as he is "one signature away from the presidency." Warner says her actions are tyrannical and likely unconstitutional, and that she leaves him no choice but to deliver the document declaring her unfit to the president pro tempore of the Senate. He later petitions to the Supreme Court to declare her preemptive firing of the Cabinet members illegal.

At the custody hearing, numerous witnesses testify against Carrie's competency as a mother. Maggie (Amy Hargreaves) takes the stand and then addresses Carrie directly; she argues that Carrie was born to do extraordinary things but is incapable of giving Franny the stable environment she needs. Maggie states that she does not believe Carrie's promise to give up her job. During a recess, Carrie agrees to give up the custody fight and accepts the visitation agreement, negotiating to see Franny every other weekend, opting not to discredit Maggie with the medical records. At Dante's funeral, Carrie asks Saul if she can still head up the operation in Russia. He answers in the affirmative, and the episode ends with Carrie and Saul en route.

== Production ==
The episode was directed by Dan Attias and co-written by executive producers Howard Gordon and Ron Nyswaner.

== Reception ==
=== Reviews ===
The episode received an approval rating of 89% on the review aggregator Rotten Tomatoes based on 9 reviews.

Shirley Li of Entertainment Weekly rated the episode a "B+", writing "The strength of this hour.. came from Carrie’s story". Brian Tallerico of New York Magazine rated the episode 3 out of 5 stars, describing Carrie's closing scene with Maggie and Franny as "tender and emotional", but also criticized the episode for requiring too much suspension of disbelief.

=== Ratings ===
The original broadcast was watched by 1.28 million viewers.
