= Abigail (2019 film) =

2019 Russian fantasy adventure film

- Film poster
- Directed by: Aleksandr Boguslavsky
- Written by: Dmitry Zhigalov; Aleksandr Boguslavsky; Aleksey Slushchev; Ilya Ipatov
- Produced by: Yevgeny Melentyev; Viktor Denisyuk; Aleksandr Kurinsky; Vladimir Denisyuk; Natalya Frolova
- Starring: Tinatin Dalakishvili; Gleb Bochkov; Rinal Mukhametov; Artyom Tkachenko; Ravshana Kurkova
- Cinematography: Eduard Moshkovich; Yuriy Nikogosov; Yuriy Korobeynikov
- Edited by: Artemy Shevchenko; Andrey Anaykin
- Music by: Ryan Otter
- Production company: KinoDanz (KD Studios)
- Distributed by: 20th Century Fox CIS
- Release date: August 22, 2019
- Running time: 110 minutes
- Country: Russia
- Languages: Russian, English
- Budget: $6 million
- Box office: $1.9 million

Abigail (Russian: Эбигейл) is a 2019 Russian steampunk fantasy adventure film directed by Aleksandr Boguslavsky, and co-produced by Viktor Denisyuk and Yevgeny Melentyev, the company KinoDanz. The film stars Tinatin Dalakishvili as Abigail Foster, with Gleb Bochkov, Rinal Mukhametov, Artyom Tkachenko, and Ravshana Kurkova.

Abigail was theatrically released in Russia on August 22, 2019, by 20th Century Fox CIS.

== Plot ==
Abigail is a young girl living in a town which, many years earlier, experienced an epidemic of a mysterious illness and was subsequently sealed off from the outside world by the government. One of those who fell ill was Abby's father, taken away when she was six years old. While searching for her father, Abby finds out that the epidemic never actually occurred; it was all a huge deceit. In fact, she lives in a world of magic. Her city has been seized by users of dark magic, who wiped out all other sorcerers, banned magic, and attempted to erase all traces of its existence.

The epidemic was a cover employed to "cleanse" the city of Magic. For many years, the Special Department has continued to snatch anyone who appears to have magical powers, deeming them "infected." Most of the inhabitants have no idea that the city's rulers are not their protectors, but their prison wardens.

One day, Abby discovers that magical powers are stirring inside her. This scares her, but however hard she tries to suppress it the magic grows within her, and agents from the Special Department begin to hunt her down. She must flee from her home and begin a journey full of adventure and danger. This journey completely transforms her perceptions about magic and the world in which she lives.

== Cast ==
- Tinatin Dalakishvili as Abigail Foster
  - Marta Timofeeva as Young Abigail
- Eddie Marsan as Jonathan Foster
- Gleb Bochkov as Bale
- Rinal Mukhametov as Norman
- Artyom Tkachenko as William Garrett
- Ravshana Kurkova as Stella
- Ksenia Kutepova as Margaret Foster
- Olivier Siou as Spenser
- Cecile Plage as Lilian
- Nikita Tarasov as Ethan
- Petar Zekavitsa as Roy
- Nikita Dyuvbanov as Marcus
- Ivan Chuykov as rebel Ryan

== Production ==
=== Filming ===
Shooting took place in Saint Petersburg, Gatchina, Moscow and in the historical part of Tallinn, Estonia. The images of the fantasy city were created on the basis of ancient buildings and narrow streets of Tallinn and Saint Petersburg, and finalized with the help of computer graphics.

Principal photography was completed in Tallinn, transformed into the streets of the fictional city Fensington, in which, according to the plot, fairy tale events take place.

Filmmakers of Abigail have developed an original conception of magic and a stylistics of closed fantastic city that combines steampunk and atmosphere of the early 20th century. There were created the unique images of the suits of city residents, rebels and their enemies – inspectors of the Security Division.

=== Post-production ===
Visual effects were created by VFX-studio Kinodanz.
