= Medea (2021 film) =

- Directed by: Alexander Zeldovich
- Written by: Alexander Zeldovich
- Produced by: Alexander Zeldovich; Tatyana Ostern; Anna Katchko
- Starring: Shai Assido; Timur Badalbeyli; Tinatin Dalakishvili; Uliana Gilmanova; Evgeniy Kharitonov; Yotam Kushnir; Anton Rival; Nour Adin Shehada
- Cinematography: Aleksandr Ilkhovskiy
- Edited by: Daniil Nikolsky
- Music by: Alexey Retinsky
- Production company: 11
- Distributed by: Nashe Kino
- Release date: 4 November 2021
- Running time: 139 minutes
- Country: Russia
- Language: Russian

Medea (Russian: Медея) is a 2021 Russian drama film directed by Alexander Zeldovich. It is scheduled to be theatrically released on 4 November 2021. The film has been officially invited in 'Harbour' section at the 51st International Film Festival Rotterdam to be held from January 26 to February 6, 2022.

== Plot ==
Medea is a contemporary adaptation of Euripides' ancient tragedy. The film follows an unnamed protagonist who journeys with her lover, Alexey, a businessman, from Moscow to Israel. Echoing the original myth, she tragically kills her brother along the way and, upon arriving in Israel, faces betrayal as Alexey leaves her for another woman. Unable to cope with the loss, she seeks revenge, ultimately taking the lives of her own children. The narrative explores themes of love, betrayal, and vengeance, interwoven with the protagonist engaging in relationships with various men.

== Cast ==
- Shai Assido as Fat man
- Timur Badalbeyli as Friend
- Tinatin Dalakishvili
- Uliana Gilmanova as Daughter
- Evgeniy Kharitonov as Brother
- Yotam Kushnir as Soldier
- Anton Rival as Frenchman
- Nour Adin Shehada as Terrorist
- Liza Sterkhova as Friend's girlfriend
- Yevgeny Tsyganov
- Oded Ben Yedidia as Watchmaker
