= Vyacheslav Razbegayev =

Russian actor

Vyacheslav Razbegaev
- Born: Vyacheslav Vyacheslavovich Razbegaev; 14 October 1965 (age 60); Moscow, RSFSR, USSR
- Occupation: Actor
- Years active: 1990-present
- Spouse: Natalya Razbegaeva
- Children: 2

Vyacheslav Vyacheslavovich Razbegayev (Russian: Вячеслав Вячеславович Разбегаев; born 14 October 1965) is a Russian actor. He has appeared in more than sixty films since 1990.

== Early life ==
Vyacheslav Razbegaev was born in Moscow, Russian SFSR, Soviet Union. He studied at school No. 356 of Pervomaisky district (1972), boarding school No. 19 of the Sevastopol district (from 1973 to 1979), at school No. 716 in Pervomaisky district (1979 to 1982). After the school year worked at the plant "Salyut".

In 1983 he was drafted for military service in the Soviet Army, served in the Far Eastern Military District.

After the army, he worked for almost three years as a decorator at the Mosfilm studios. And there, having plunged into the atmosphere of cinema, decided to become an actor. Especially since he had not had an education, he was able to withdraw in the episode of the film Interception (1986), although it was not indicated in the credits.

In 1988 he entered the Moscow Art Theater School, on the course of I.M. Tarkhanov, who graduated in 1992. After graduation he entered the troupe of the Central Academic Theater of the Soviet Army.

== Career ==
The first serious work in Soviet film - a role in the popular adventure film The Deerslayer (1990). In the early 1990s, the actor starred in several other films Woman in the Sea (1992), The Flight of the Night Butterfly (1992), Weather Is Good on Deribasovskaya, It Rains Again on Brighton Beach (1992).

== Personal life ==
He is married to Natalya Razbegaeva, and they have two daughters.

== Selected filmography ==
=== Film ===
Year	Title	Role	Notes
2002	Antikiller	King	
2002	Stereoblood	Viktor	
2004	Countdown	Umar Tamiev	
2005	Graveyard Shift	Shopkeeper	
2009	Dark Planet: Rebellion	Krysolov	Part 2
2009	O Lucky Man!	Maykl	
2009	Antikiller 3	Metis	
2011	Rider	Shamil Saffirov	
2012	Players	General	
2016	Mafia: The Game of Survival	Vladimir	
2016	Flight Crew	Victor Nikolayevich, pilot from the island in airport Kanwoo	
2017	Guardians	Major-general Nikolai Dolgo	
2018	The Soul Conductor	Laktin	

=== Television ===
Year	Title	Role	Notes
2006	The Storm Gate	Shah	
2009	Barvikha	Rostislav Pudeev	
2010	The Gold Trap	Svir	
2010	Citizen Warden	Anatoly Belov, captain (FSIN)	
2010	The Tower	Viktor, architect of the Tower	(ru)
2011	Dusty Work	Sergey Ivanovich Knyazev	
2011	The Nutty	Gleb Gubin	
2011	Underworld Trilogy: The Cop	Andrej	
2011	Terminal	Major Muratov	
2011	Golden. Barvikha 2	Otets Evgeniya	
2011	Object 11	Aleksandr Dikoy	
2011	Double Continuous. Love	father	TV
2011-12	Hot on the Heels	Andrey Shulgin	
2012	Citizen Warden 2	Anatoly Vladimirovich Belov, the captain, major (FSIN)	
2012	Lednikov	Dmitriy Almesov	
2013	The Junior Team	Vladimir Belov, the father of Anton Antipov	
2013	Kochet's Nest	Sergey Kochet, Police Major	TV
2013	Investigator Protasov	Elisey Danilovich Protasov	
2013	Shore of My Dreams	Andrey Nikolaev, the commander of ship	
2014	Orca	Igor Vinogradov, Colonel of the Police	
2016	Love and the Sea	Aleksey	Mini-Series
2016	Bunch of Grapes	Vasily Grigoriev	
2016	New Life	Oleg	
