= About Love (2015 film) =

- Official Poster
- Directed by: Anna Melikyan
- Written by: Anna Melikyan; Andrey Migachev
- Produced by: Anna Melikyan
- Starring: Renata Litvinova; Kristina Isaykina; Mikhail Efremov; Yuri Kolokolnikov; Yuliya Snigir; Vladimir Mashkov; Aleksandra Bortich
- Cinematography: Fedor Lyass
- Edited by: Mikhail Igonin
- Music by: Dmitriy Emelyanov
- Production company: Magnum
- Distributed by: ANT!PODE
- Release dates: 13 June 2015 (Sochi Film Festival Kinotavr); 10 December 2015
- Running time: 115 minutes
- Country: Russia
- Language: Russian

About Love (Russian: Про любовь, romanized: Pro lyubov) is a 2015 Russian romantic comedy. It was written by Anna Melikyan and Andrey Migachev directed by Melikyan. It won the Main Prize and the Prize of Film Distributors Jury at the Kinotavr film festival. It also was awarded at the Golden Eagle Awards as the Best Feature Film. A sequel was released in 2017.

== Plot ==
The audience gathered at the "Strelka" to listen to the open lecture "About love". The female lecturer combines scientific interpretations of the biological essence of the organism's processes with high feelings about which poems and music are written. The lecture is accompanied by experiences and experiments, in which listeners become participants themselves. Several stories run parallel to this event.

=== Roleplay ===
Police raid the club, where members of the anime movement gather for free communication. Among the detainees are Himea and Taito, who have been in a relationship for six months, but who have never seen each other without images. They decide to date in the traditional sense, but this fails. They successfully form a relationship only after dressing as anime characters. A lonely police officer decides to do the same, having already attracted interest from someone in the club.

=== Layoff ===
A successful businessman calls his employees together. He announces that due to the economic crisis, he is dismissing the entire team. The office manager Liza doesn't know what to do, because now there was nobody to make coffee for. However, her boss is attracted to her, and he offers to keep her employed in exchange for sex. Liza is overwhelmed by doubts about the proposal that has been received, and this affects her relationship with her boyfriend Grisha, who has already been unemployed for three months and spends all his time on the computer. Liza decides to accept the offer of the businessman, not knowing that Grisha will propose to her that very evening.

=== Festival of Russian culture ===
Representatives of different nations come to Moscow to attend a festival of Russian culture. Among the participants of the festival is a Japanese woman named Miyako. One of her main goals is the search for a Russian husband. To do this, she uses a dating site to organize several dates, with each of the candidates being associated with musical notes. The candidate she chooses to invite to her room is a man who gave Miyako a matryoshka. The man is revealed to be married with children, and is simply interested with having sex with as many foreign women as possible. Frustrated, Miyako knocks at the door of a neighboring room, where another festival participant lives - a Japanese guy from her home town. He turns out the only one with whom she can discuss the Russian soul and Russian culture. After talking all night and performing the song "Gop-Stop" for the fidelity to the guitar, they fall in love.

=== Lover of womanly beauty ===
Boris is a public figure who advocates the demolition of monuments that disfigure the face of the city. He is also a graffiti artist who leaves his art on boring walls of the city. Each artwork is of a woman that he falls in love with. His wife discovers his hobby, having tracked him down through Instagram. Under the cover of the night, she tries to destroy the drawing and runs into her rival, whose image has just been destroyed. The two get acquainted, spend a bright night in the city, after which they return home together, where their beloved artist sleeps. The three of them decide to live together.

=== Nymphomaniac ===
The heroine of the final story is the lecturer herself of the course about love. She organizes a sexual encounter with a man, who turns out to be her ex; he proposed to his girlfriend the day before. At the same time, he does not wish to get married, and applies for a paid consultation with his ex. He discovers that his girlfriend used several magic spells, including a voodoo doll. On requests to remove the love spell of the lecturer refuses and, taking the promised fee, leaves. On the street she meets the artist Boris, for whom she becomes a new object of inspiration.

== Cast ==
- Renata Litvinova as lecturer
- Kristina Isaykina as sleeping girl
- Mikhail Efremov as groom
- Mariya Shalayeva as Lena Grachyova (Himea)
- Vasiliy Raksha as Igor Petrov (Taito)
- Ravshana Kurkova as Olya, a police officer
- Keisuke Shibasaki as Yoshi, Japanese in Moscow
- Miyako Shimamura as Miyako, Japanese in Moscow
- Yuri Kolokolnikov as familiar Miyako (note Re)
- Yuliya Snigir as Liza, office manager
- Aleksey Filimonov as Grisha
- Vladimir Mashkov as Viktor Borisovich, businessman
- Aleksandra Bortich as Sasha
- Mariya Danilyuk as Mila
- Yevgeny Tsyganov as Boris
- Maksim Lagashkin as policeman 1
- Aleksandr Robak as policeman 2
- Alexei Makarov as familiar Miyako (note Mi)
- Sergey Muravyov as familiar Miyako (note La)
- Nikita Ost as familiar Miyako (note Sol)
- Nikolay Orlovskiy as familiar Miyako (note Do)
