= Dead Daughters =

- Russia release poster
- Directed by: Pavel Ruminov
- Written by: Pavel Ruminov
- Produced by: Pavel Ruminov; Anton Tishakov
- Starring: Yekaterina Shcheglova; Mikhail Dementyev; Nikita Yemshanov; Darya Charusha
- Cinematography: Fedor Lyass
- Edited by: Pavel Ruminov
- Music by: Pavel Ruminov
- Distributed by: Central Partnership; International: Paramount Pictures
- Release date: February 1, 2007
- Running time: 123 mins.
- Country: Russia
- Language: Russian
- Budget: $1,300,000 (est.)
- Box office: $1 418 200

Dead Daughters (Russian: Мёртвые дочери, translit. Myortvye docheri) is a Russian arthouse horror film directed by Pavel Ruminov.

== Plot ==
A series of mysterious deaths occur in Moscow. Everyone tends to see them as just accidents, and no one thinks to connect them. After all, in a world where everyone has watched more than one horror movie, it is very difficult to believe in the reality of the legend of ghosts.

It is difficult until your friend dies, and the risk of becoming another victim of the girls who have risen from the dead does not hang over you. Anna and her friends will live in fear for three days. The slightest mistake or careless act threatens terrible retribution.

Each of the young people will try to find their own way out, their own path to salvation, their own way to avoid punishment.

== Cast ==
- Ekaterina Shcheglova as Anna
- Mikhail Dementyev as Anton
- Nikita Emshanov as Nikita
- Darya Charusha as Vera
- Artyom Semakin as Yegor
- Ravshana Kurkova as Rita

== Reception ==
Stas Lobastov from Film.ru rated the film 3 out of 10. In his opinion, "Ruminov, with some kind of doom, agrees on screen that the lives of his peers are boring, sluggish and uninteresting". Lidiya Maslova noted: “Advertised as a horror film, it is in fact an educational film sketch about how difficult it is for a young person to develop reliable concepts for life”.

Roman Volobuev also gave a negative assessment: "The Japanese canon taken as a basis seems to imply calm contemplation but Ruminov does not allow life on the screen to flow normally. He is great at filming women's faces, nine-story buildings, blood on maple leaves. He has the heavenly beauty of the actress Ekaterina Shcheglova and (it seems) some of his own ideas about good and evil. But he cannot make use of this, since he is terrified to the point of convulsions that they will stop listening to him. Panic in the face of potential audience indifference is generally the scourge of Russian filmmakers with ideas".
