= Yevgeny Tsyganov =

Russian film and theater actor (born 1979)

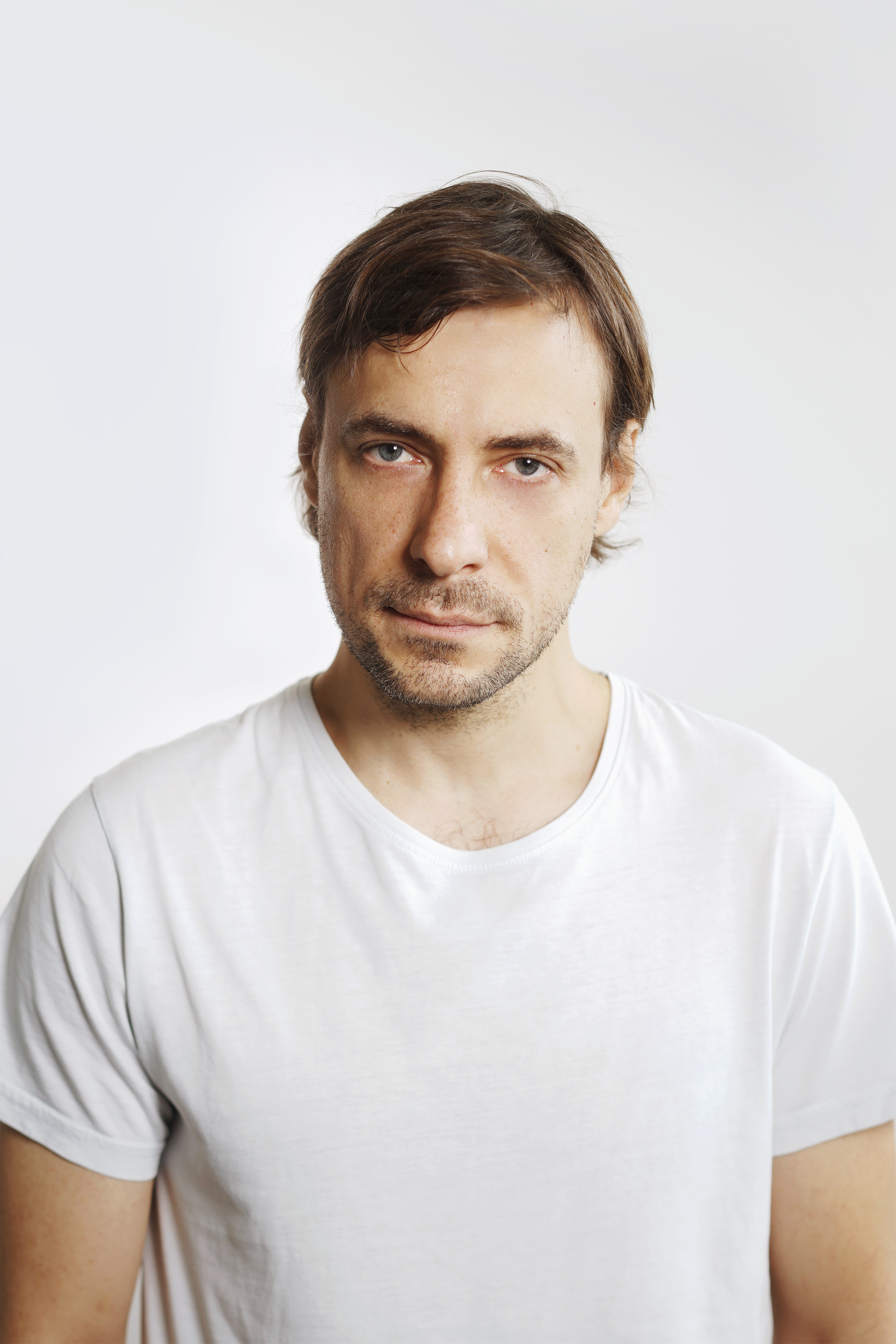
- Tsyganov in 2017
- Born: 15 March 1979 (age 47); Moscow, USSR
- Education: Russian Institute of Theatre Arts
- Occupation: Actor
- Years active: 2001–present
- Spouses: Irina Leonova (m. 2005; div. 2015) Yuliya Snigir (m. 2019)
- Children: 8
- Awards: Kinotavr (2002); Golden Eagle Award (2015); Prize Government of Russian Federation in the field of culture (2015)

Yevgeny Eduardovich Tsyganov (Russian: Евгений Эдуардович Цыганов; born 15 March 1979) is a Russian stage and film actor, director, screenwriter and composer.

== Life and career ==
=== Early years and education ===
Yevgeny Tsyganov was born in Moscow in the family of employees of the Moscow Research Institute.

Yevgeny graduated from the music school in the piano performance class. Starting from the age of nine, he spent four years playing various roles at the Taganka Theatre, where he participated in productions created especially for young viewers.

In 1993-97 Tsyganov performed with the youth rock band A.S. Then he created a new group with his friends, Grenki, and played at various clubs in and around Moscow. The band released one album and was disbanded by 2004, reunited in 2009.

In 1996 he entered the Boris Shchukin Theatre Institute, but studied there for only one year and eventually decided to change his major to film direction. In 1997 he entered the directing department Russian Institute of Theatre Arts, from which he graduated in 2001, where he met Pyotr Fomenko, who some time later invited Yevgeny to work together on some joint projects.

=== Acting career ===
In 2000, Tsyganov played a role in the play One Absolutely Happy Village and a year later joined Pyotr Fomenko Studio Theater.

In 2001, Yevgeny played a title role in the film Collector (2001) by Yuri Grymov, which was his first film role. The debut was very successful and kick-started his cinema career. Already in 2002, Tsyganov was awarded at the film festival Kinotavr for his role in the film Let’s Make Love.

The movie Mermaid (2007), in which he played a major role, was selected as the Russian entry for the Academy Award for Best International Feature Film, but was not nominated.

In the following years he built up an impressive portfolio in Russian cinema, yet remained active in the theatre.

In 2022, he won the Golden Mask as Best Actor for his performance in Dmitry Krymov's Mozart. Don Juan. The General Rehearsal in Fomenko Workshop Theatre.

As of 2024, he is referred to as the main actor of Russian cinema.

In April 2025, Tsyganov won Silver Saint George for Best Actor Prize at the 47th Moscow International Film Festival for his performance in the film Family Happiness.

=== Personal life ===
Yevgeny married actress Irina Leonova in 2005. The couple has seven children. In 2015, the actor left the family. His wife at the time was expecting their seventh child. In 2019 Tsyganov married actress Yuliya Snigir. On 9 March 2016, their son Fedor was born.

== Selected filmography ==
Year	Title	Role	Notes
2001	Collector	Ilya	
2002	Let's Make Love	Postnikov	
2003	The Stroll	Petya	
2004	Children of the Arbat	Sasha Pankratov	
2005	Dreaming of Space	Gherman	
2006	Hunter	Vladimir	
2006	Piter FM	Maksim	
2007	Branch of Lilac	Sergei Rachmaninoff	
2007	Mermaid	Aleksandr 'Sasha' Viktorovich	
2008	Plus One	puppet	cameo
2009	Newsmakers	Herman	
2010	Fortress of War	Lieutenant Pochernikov	
2010	Inadequate People	psychologist Pavel Kozlov	
2011	Brothel Lights	Valera	
2013	The Thaw	Viktor Khrustalyov	TV series
2015	Battle for Sevastopol	Leonid	
2015	Territory	Andrei Gurin	
2015	About Love	Boris	
2015	Garden of Eden	Zilov	
2015	The Land of Oz	driver	
2016	Sophia	Ivan III	TV series
2017	Blockbuster	Khlebnikov	
2017	You All Infuriate Me	Gennady Chernykh	TV series
2017	About Love. For Adults Only	passer	
2018	A Rough Draft	Anton	
2018	The Man Who Surprised Everyone	Yegor Korshunov	
2018	The Soul Conductor	Kalkov	
2019	Dead Lake	Maksim Pokrovskiy	
2020	Inadequate People 2	psychologist Pavel Kozlov	
2021	Medea		
2023	1993	Viktor	
2024	The Master and Margarita	the Master	
2025	Batya 2: Ded		
2025	Scenes of Friendly Ties		
