= Irina Leonova =

Russian actress

- Born: Irina Jourjevna Leonova; August 22, 1978 (age 47); Tallinn, Estonia
- Occupation: Actress
- Years active: 2000–present
- Spouses: Igor Petrenko (m. 2000; div. 2004) Yevgeny Tsyganov (m. 2005; div. 2015)
- Children: 7
- Awards: State Prize (2003)

Irina Leonova (Russian: Ири́на Ю́рьевна Лео́нова; born August 22, 1978) is a Russian theater and film actress.

== Biography ==
Irina Leonova was born in Tallinn. In 2000, she graduated from Mikhail Shchepkin Higher Theatre School (course of Viktor Korshunov) and joined Maly Theatre.

=== Personal life ===
- In 2000 — 2004 Irina was married to actor Igor Petrenko (born 1977).
- In 2005 — 2015 Irina was married to actor Yevgeny Tsyganov (born 1979). They have seven children:
  - daughter Polina (2005)
  - son Nikita (2006)
  - son Andrey (2009),
  - daughter Sophia (2010)
  - son Alexander (2011)
  - son George (2014)
  - daughter Vera (2015)

== Selected filmography ==
- We Must Live Again (1999) as Liza
- Poisons or the World History of Poisoning (2001) as episode
- Children of the Arbat (2004) as Lena Budyagina
- Dream On (2005) as Alice
- Hello, Moscow! (2005) as Tamara, the minister's daughter
- Kuprin. The Pit (2014) as Vera Nikolaevna Sheina

== Awards ==
- 2004 — State Prize of the Russian Federation
