= Dislike (film) =

- Russian: Дизлайк
- Directed by: Pavel Ruminov
- Written by: Evgeny Kolyadintsev; Pavel Ruminov
- Produced by: Ivan Kapitonov; Pavel Ruminov
- Starring: Anastasiya Akatova; Evgeniy Dakot; Oleg Gaas; Maria Lavrova; Diana Melison
- Cinematography: Fedor Struchev
- Edited by: Pavel Ruminov
- Release date: September 22, 2016
- Country: Russia
- Language: Russian

Dislike (Russian: Дизлайк) is a 2016 Russian slasher film directed by Pavel Ruminov.

== Plot ==
The film tells about a group of successful Russian video bloggers who were invited to a country cottage for a tasting of a new energy drink. Once there, they realized that they had fallen into a trap and unwittingly became participants in a quiz in which they had to answer the question: Who ordered your murder?, the wrong answer to which would deprive one of the video bloggers of life.

== Cast ==
- Anastasiya Akatova as Roksanna
- Evgeniy Dakot as Boris
- Oleg Gaas as Prank
- Maria Lavrova
- Diana Melison
- Nikita Moskovoy
- Aleksandr Panin
