= Stereoblood =

2002 film directed by Roman Prygunov

- Directed by: Roman Prygunov
- Written by: Pavel Ruminov
- Starring: Ingeborga Dapkunaite
- Cinematography: James Gucciardo
- Release date: June 2002 (Moscow)
- Running time: 96 minutes
- Country: Russia
- Language: Russian

Stereoblood (Russian: Одиночество крови, romanized: Odinochestvo krovi, also released as Solitude of Blood) is a 2002 Russian thriller film directed by Roman Prygunov. It was entered into the 24th Moscow International Film Festival.

== Cast ==
- Ingeborga Dapkunaite as Maria
- Yuriy Kutsenko as Vladimir
- Vyacheslav Razbegaev as Viktor
- Oksana Fandera as Greta
- Lev Prygunov as Director
- Roman Radov as Doctor
- Elvira Bolgova as Girl the student
- Mariya Syomkina as Girl the musician
- Natalya Rogozhkina as Girl on the ice
