= Fairy (film) =

2020 Russian drama film

- Film poster
- Directed by: Anna Melikyan
- Written by: Anna Melikyan
- Starring: Konstantin Khabenskiy; Ingeborga Dapkunaite; Ekaterina Ageeva; Vilen Babichev; Tinatin Dalakishvili; Nikita Elenev; Vladimir Mishukov; Mariya Shalayeva
- Cinematography: Andrey Mayka
- Music by: Kirill Rikhter
- Production company: Magnum
- Distributed by: KinoPoisk HD
- Release date: August 1, 2020
- Running time: 152 minutes
- Country: Russia
- Language: Russian

Fairy (Russian: Фея, romanized: Feya) is a 2020 Russian drama film directed by Anna Melikyan. It was theatrically released in Russia on August 1, 2020, by KinoPoisk HD.

== Plot ==
The film is about a virtual reality game developer who thinks he has control over everything in this world until he meets a young and beautiful activist.

== Cast ==
- Konstantin Khabenskiy as Evgeniy Voygin
- Ingeborga Dapkunaite as Olga Yatsuk
- Ekaterina Ageeva as Tanya
- Vilen Babichev as Face control
- Tinatin Dalakishvili as Mariya
- Nikita Elenev as Lyokha
- Vladimir Mishukov as Igor
- Mariya Shalayeva as Alisa
