= Children of the Arbat (TV series) =

- DVD cover
- Дети Арбата
- Written by: Julia Damsker; Valentin Chernykh
- Directed by: Andrei Eshpai
- Starring: Chulpan Khamatova; Yevgeny Tsyganov; Irina Leonova; Daniil Strakhov; Inga Strelkova-Oboldina
- Theme music composer: Andrei Ledenyov
- Country of origin: Russia
- Original language: Russian
- No. of episodes: 16

Production
- Producers: Konstantin Ernst; Andrei Kamorin; Aleksandr Potemkin
- Cinematography: Shandor Berkeshi
- Running time: 765 min.

Original release
- Network: Channel One
- Release: 30 August – 23 September 2004

Children of the Arbat (Russian: Дети Арбата, romanized: Deti Arbata) is a 16-part television series based on the Children of the Arbat trilogy by Anatoly Rybakov. It aired on the Channel One network in Russia in 2004.

== Plot ==
The series closely follows the plot of Rybakov's trilogy. Set in the Soviet Union in the 1930s, it tells the story of Sasha Pankratov (Yevgeny Tsyganov), a student and loyal Komsomol member from the Arbat neighborhood of Moscow who is unfairly exiled to Siberia.

As his family and friends, including his love interest Varya Ivanova (Chulpan Khamatova), grapple with Sasha's sudden detention and departure, the series shows the growing fear and paranoia that gripped Moscow in the years before the murder of Sergey Kirov and the start of Stalin's Great Purge.
