= The Balkan Line =

2019 Russian–Serbian action film

- Movie poster
- Directed by: Andrey Volgin
- Written by: Ivan Naumov; Natalya Nazarova; Andrey Anaykin
- Produced by: Gosha Kutsenko; Vadim Byrkin; Vasil Sevc; Tatyana Kuranova; Anastasiya Pelevina; Dmitriy Rubezhin; Dmitriy Zemskov; Miloš Biković; Miodrag Radonjić
- Starring: Anton Pampushnyy; Gosha Kutsenko; Miloš Biković; Gojko Mitić; Ravshana Kurkova
- Music by: Michael Afanasyev
- Production companies: 20th Century Fox CIS; Upgrade Vision; Bless Film; Archangel Studios
- Distributed by: 20th Century Fox CIS (Russia); Art Vista (Serbia)
- Release date: 21 March 2019
- Running time: 130 minutes
- Countries: Russia, Serbia
- Languages: Russian, Serbian
- Budget: 230 million ₽ ($3.6 million)
- Box office: $5.85 million

The Balkan Line (Russian: Балканский рубеж, romanized: Balkanskiy rubezh; Serbian: Балканска међа / Balkanska međa) is a 2019 Russian–Serbian action film directed by Andrey Volgin, depicting the Russian military's secret operation to capture Slatina Airport in Kosovo after the bombing of Yugoslavia, led by Yunus-bek Yevkurov.

The film was released in Russia on 21 March 2019 (three days prior to the 20th anniversary of the events depicted in the film); it was released by 20th Century Fox CIS after the acquisition of 21st Century Fox by Disney.

== Plot ==
In 1999, during the bombing of Yugoslavia and the Kosovo War, Slatina airfield is taken over by a UÇK battalion led by an Albanian warlord, Smuk. Afterwards, an operation to capture the airfield from them is conducted by GRU agents. The separatists engage in organ harvesting, robberies, assassinations, and ethnic cleansing.

GRU officer Aslan-Bek Evkhoev and former paratrooper-turned-mercenary Andrey Shatalov head a small detachment tasked with the dangerous mission to stop the Albanians, recapture the airfield held from them, and hold it until Russian Airborne Troops reinforcements stationed in Bosnia arrive ahead of NATO forces, which the team will leave beforehand, as well as rescue Shatalov's love interest Jasna Blagojević, who was captured to be harvested for organs, along with several ethnic Serb prisoners.

== Cast ==
- Anton Pampushnyy as Andrey "Shatay" Shatalov
- Gosha Kutsenko as Aslan-Bek "Bek" Evkhoev (based on Yunus-Bek Yevkurov)
- Miloš Biković as Vuk Majevski, Yugoslav police officer
- Milena Radulović as Jasna Blagojević, doctor
- Gojko Mitić as Goran Milić, head of the Yugoslav police station
- Sergey Marin as Ilya "Slush" Slashchev
- Nodari Janelidze as Rustam "Girey" Mamatgireyev
- Kirill Polukhin as Oleg "Baria" Barmin, sapper
- Ravshana Kurkova as Vera Kurbaeva, sniper
- Dmitriy Frid as Dr. Stern, doctor from Switzerland, Smuk's accomplice
- Aleksandar Srećković as Smuk
- Svetlana Chuykina as Marta, doctor, assistant to Dr. Stern
- Miodrag Radonjić as Amir, Smuk's right-hand man
- Nikola Randelović as Stevan
- Roman Kurtsyn as Senior Lieutenant Nikolay Poltoratskiy, platoon commander
- Srđan Todorović as Goran, con artist
- Nikita Kologrivyy as Kirya
- Emir Kusturica as the taxi driver (cameo appearance)
- Mikhail Khmurov as General Viktor Ivanovich Somov (based on Leonid Ivashov)
- Konstantin Solovyov as Colonel Platov (based on Viktor Zavarzin)
- Anna Chapman as the journalist

== Production ==
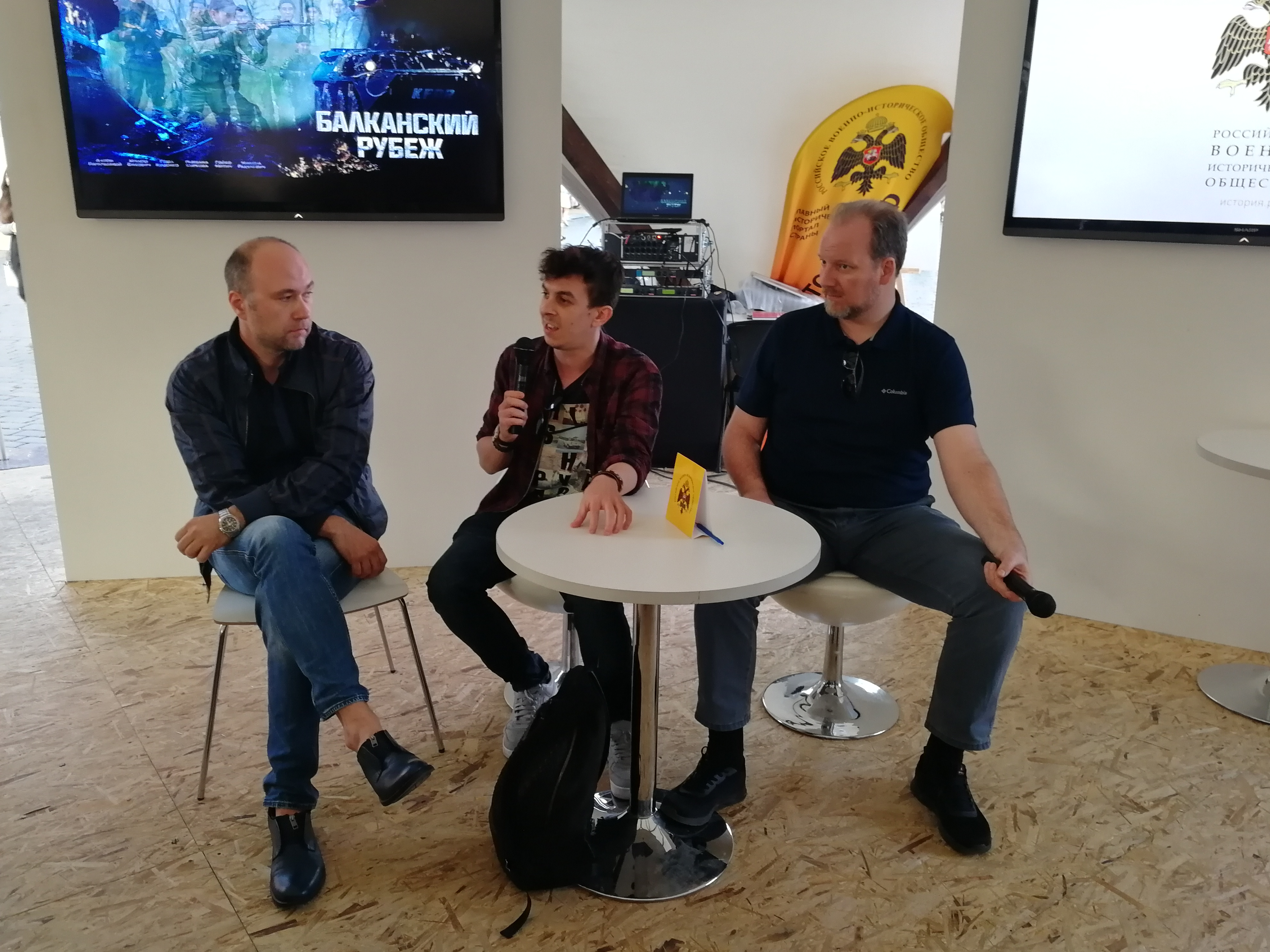
The creators of the film The Balkan Line (from left to right): Andrey Volgin, Andrey Anaykin, Ivan Naumov

The idea of creating a film about the events in Yugoslavia came to Gosha Kutsenko in 2012, during a conversation with a friend, Slovak producer Vasil Shevts. The writer Ivan Naumov was invited to write the script, and he created a 600-page love story of a Russian peacekeeper and a Serbian girl. Kutsenko later met with producer Vadim Byrkin and General Yunus-Bek Yevkurov, who agreed to help him. The real details of the operation in which Yevkurov participated (at that time - the GRU special forces major) are still under the stamp of secrecy, so the scriptwriters thought up the plot at their own discretion, and Yevkurov advised them on the reliability of what was happening.

=== Casting ===
Miloš Biković was first offered the role of a Russian soldier, but he refused, deciding that it would be more logical for him to play a Serb in a joint film between Russia and Serbia. However, he immediately agreed to help organize the filming in his homeland and became not only an actor, but also one of the producers of the film.

Milena Radulović (sr) especially for participating in the filming of the film studied Russian and improved it every time, after which she now speaks it with almost no accent.

Emir Kusturica played a small role as a Belgrade taxi driver; According to executive producer Anastasia Pelevina, at first the director had to enter the crew from the Serbian side, but their work schedules did not match.

=== Filming ===
For the filming, all the actors playing the role of special forces went through heavy two-month training which focused on shooting and physical conditioning. Location filming took place in Moscow, the Moscow Oblast, the Republic of Crimea, Russia, and Serbia.

== Release ==
The film was released to Russia, Serbia, Kyrgyzstan, Armenia, Belarus and Kazakhstan on March 21, 2019.
