= Hostages (2017 film) =

2017 Georgian film

- Directed by: Rezo Gigineishvili
- Written by: Rezo Gigineishvili; Lasha Bugadze
- Produced by: Vladimer Katcharava, Tamara Tatishvili, Mihail Fenogenov
- Starring: Merab Ninidze; Tinatin Dalakishvili
- Cinematography: Vladislav Opeliants
- Edited by: Andrey Gamov, Jarosław Kamiński
- Music by: Giya Kancheli
- Distributed by: 20 Steps Productions; Inkfilm
- Release date: 10 February 2017 (Berlin)
- Running time: 103 minutes
- Countries: Russia; Georgia
- Language: Georgian

Hostages is a 2017 drama film directed and written by Rezo Gigineishvili and co-written by Lasha Bugadze. It was screened in the Panorama section at the 67th Berlin International Film Festival.

Hostages is based on a true story about a group of Soviet Georgian youngsters who try to escape the Soviet Union by hijacking Aeroflot Flight 6833 in 1983.

== Plot ==
During the early 1980s in Georgia, just a few years before the collapse of the Soviet Union, a group of young people from respected Georgian families were looking to escape the Soviet Union. The Beatles's music, jeans, American cigarettes, position in society, guaranteed future. They seemed to have everything except one thing — freedom. Unfortunately, The price of their freedom was their own demise. A true story based on the events of 1983, when six guys and one girl tried to hijack a plane in order to escape from the USSR.

== Cast ==
- Merab Ninidze (Levan)
- Darejan Kharshiladze (Nino)
- Tinatin Dalakishvili (Anna)
- Avtandil Makharadze (Shota, Sandro's father)
- Irakli Kvirikadze (Nika)
- Giga Datiashvili (Koka)
- Giorgi Grdzelidze (Sandro)
- George Tabidze (Oto)
- Giorgi Khurtsilava (Lasha)
- Vakhtang Chachanidze (Irakli)
- Ekaterine Kalatozishvili (Tamuna)
- Beka Lemonjava (Zuriko)
- Iliko Sukhishvili (Father Daniil)

== Production ==
The film is a Georgian-Russian co-production and the producing companies are NEBO Films and 20 Steps Productions. The film's script won a co-production competition which was held by the Georgian National Film Center.

London-based sales agent WestEnd Films acquired world rights to Rezo Gigineishvili's drama film after its premiere in the Panorama strand of the 2017 Berlin Film Festival.

== Reception ==
In 2017, US industry trade publication Variety said of Hostages, "Georgia has its first European shooting star with Irakli Kvirikadze."

As of 2024, Hostages has an approval rating of 90% on review aggregator website Rotten Tomatoes, from 10 critic reviews.
