= Sober Driver =

- Russian: Трезвый водитель
- Directed by: Rezo Gigineishvili
- Written by: Ivan Baranov; Veta Geraskina; Rezo Gigineishvili
- Produced by: Eduard Iloyan; Rezo Gigineishvili; Vitaliy Shlyappo; Aleksey Trotsyuk; Denis Zhalinskiy; Aleksandr Kushaev; David Gulordava; Semyon Kapsh; Kirill Komarov
- Starring: Viktor Khorinyak; Andrey Burkovsky; Irina Martynenko; Yanina Studilina; Kirill Simonenko; Dmitriy Kulichkov
- Cinematography: Mikhail Khasaya
- Edited by: Yuriy Karikh
- Music by: Ivan Dorn
- Release date: July 19, 2019 (Горький fest)
- Country: Russia
- Language: Russian

Sober Driver (Russian: Трезвый водитель) is a 2019 Russian comedy film directed by Rezo Gigineishvili.

== Plot ==
A young naive provincial Artyom comes to a friend in Moscow in the hope of a new beautiful life, but first he has to help him in the difficult night work of a "Sober Driver". On the first evening, taking the beautiful Christina out of the nightclub, Artyom, by a misunderstanding, finds himself in an expensive hotel room with her. Completely not remembering the events of last night, Christine takes the guy for a young millionaire, and he, in turn, is in no hurry to disappoint her. With each date Artyom falls in love more and more, but getting out of ridiculous situations becomes more difficult.

== Cast ==
- Viktor Khorinyak as Artyom
- Andrey Burkovsky as Stanislav
- Irina Martynenko as Kristina
- Yanina Studilina as Katya
- Kirill Simonenko as representative "StopHam"
- Dmitriy Kulichkov as Nikolay
- Evgeniy Sangadzhiev as Bellboy
- Natalya Zhernakova as Artyom's mom
- Sergey Belyaev as Anatoliy
- Maria Poezzhaeva as activist girl

== Release ==
The film was released on March 21, 2019.
