= Love with an Accent =

- Film poster
- Russian: Любовь с акцентом
- Directed by: Rezo Gigineishvili
- Written by: Rezo Gigineishvili; Alisa Khmelnitskaya; Davit Turashvili
- Produced by: Archil Gelovani; Vladimer Katcharava; Roman Kokorev; Igor Mishin
- Starring: Anna Mikhalkova; Nadezhda Mikhalkova; Merab Ninidze; Sofiya Nizharadze; Onise Oniani
- Edited by: Maksim Malyavin
- Music by: Dato Evgenidze
- Distributed by: Central Partnership
- Release date: June 2012 (Moscow)
- Running time: 100 minute
- Country: Russia
- Language: Russian

Love with an Accent (Russian: Любовь с акцентом, romanized: Liubov s aktsentom) is a 2012 Russian comedy film directed by Rezo Gigineishvili.

== Plot ==
The film tells five intertwined stories against the backdrop of southern nature.

=== Helga from Vilnius ===
Helga (Anna Mikhalkova), a modest television employee from Vilnius, dreams of having a child. After hearing on the radio that a 97-year-old man in Georgia became a father, she buys a ticket to Tbilisi. For a week, she searches for a suitable match, going to football games, concerts, khinkali restaurants, and jogging in parks. Almost losing hope, she even prays to the "Mother of Kartli" monument to send her the right man. Unbeknownst to her, a hotel porter (Georgy Kalandarishvili) has been admiring her all along. Eventually, they connect. In the epilogue, a pregnant Helga talks to her love on the phone as he brings her khachapuri on his way to Lithuania.

=== The Wedding ===
On the same flight, famous director Artem (Filipp Yankovsky) and young doctor Sasha (Artur Smolyaninov) meet. Artem is heading to finalize a divorce, while Sasha is en route to get married. Artem convinces Sasha, who rarely drinks, to join him in a drink, leaving Sasha unable to stand up when they land. After various misadventures, Artem arrives in the mountain village where Sasha's fiancée, Sofiko (Sofia Nizharadze), awaits him. Since the entire village expects her groom, Sofiko asks Artem to temporarily pose as her fiancé.

=== The Guide and the Cook ===
Ketevan (Olga Babluani), a tour guide, often takes her guests to a small cafe where Leo (Duta Skhirtladze), the cook, works. Leo has been in love with her, but he’s too shy to confess his feelings. Inspired by the story of Niko Pirosmani, who once gifted a million roses to his beloved, Leo sells his apartment. However, when the couriers deliver the enormous bouquets to Ketevan's courtyard, she’s not home—she’s away on a tour.

=== Sochi to Batumi ===
A young couple, Lesya (Tinatin Dalakishvili) and Andrey (Nikita Efremov), flee from men hired by Lesya's father. They take a boat from Sochi to Batumi, where they meet Misha (Mikhail Meskhi), a deportee from Russia who offers them a place to stay. However, the apartment turns out to belong to someone else, leaving the couple stranded. Misha assures them they won’t go hungry on a Saturday in Georgia, as weddings are plentiful. His plan proves successful as they sneak into a wedding, posing as guests, where they meet a distinguished gentleman (Vakhtang Kikabidze) and his lifelong partner (Nani Bregvadze), celebrating their golden anniversary.

=== Zuka and Gio ===
Gio (Merab Ninidze), evading the authorities, spends his days hidden in a friend’s apartment. His only visitor is third-grader Zuka (Zuka Tserikidze), who waters the plants and plays the piano. The music catches the attention of Nadia (Nadezhda Mikhalkova) in the neighboring building, and she and Gio develop a mutual attraction. Despite knowing he shouldn’t leave, Gio cannot resist accepting Nadia’s invitation to a concert.

== Cast ==
- Anna Mikhalkova
- Nadezhda Mikhalkova
- Merab Ninidze
- Sofiya Nizharadze
- Onise Oniani
- Filipp Yankovsky
- Artur Smolyaninov
- Nikita Efremov
- Vakhtang Kikabidze
