= Antikiller =

- Russian DVD cover
- Directed by: Egor Konchalovsky
- Written by: Danil Koretsky
- Produced by: Yusup Bakshiyev; Vladimir Kilburg; Viktor Taknov
- Starring: Gosha Kutsenko; Mikhail Ulyanov
- Cinematography: Anton Antonov
- Edited by: Bénédicte Brunet; Olga Grinshpun
- Distributed by: Central Partnership
- Release date: 1 August 2002
- Running time: 114 minutes
- Country: Russia
- Language: Russian
- Budget: US$5 million
- Box office: $340,312 (Russia)

Antikiller (Russian: Антикиллер) is a 2002 Russian crime film directed by Egor Konchalovsky. It portrays a brutal war between obnoxious crime gangs and a one-man vigilante, a former police officer. The movie is based on Danil Koretsky’s novel of the same name, which has sold five million copies in the countries of the former Soviet Union and has acquired cult status among readers of Russian pulp fiction. Like the novel, the film became the box office leader among Russian films in 2002.

== Plot ==
Former criminal investigator, Major Korenev, nicknamed Fox, gets out of jail, where he spent many years after being betrayed by his corrupt colleagues, and settles scores with his old and new enemies.

The film uncovers the anatomy of the beginning of Russian economical boom which began the in 1990s and the many varieties of crime which came with it. Fox (Gosha Kutsenko) went to jail when the Soviet Union was still alive, but returns from prison to a new country, Russia, which the film portrays as a lawless post-industrial wasteland ruled by competing criminal gangs. Fox settles accounts with Shaman (Aleksandr Baluev), the criminal boss who sent him to jail; kills Ape (Viktor Sukhorukov), a sadistic gang leader who kills and rapes randomly for art's sake; topples the city's major gangs; and reestablishes his version of the rule of law. The only criminal boss who survives the war among the major gangs is "Cross" (Sergei Shakurov), whose ascetic and down to earth style helps him to unseat the kingpin "Father" (Mikhail Ulyanov) modeled on Don Vito Corleone.

== Cast ==
- Gosha Kutsenko as Major Korenev, aka Fox.
- Mikhail Ulyanov as Father
- Sergey Shakurov as Cross
- Aleksandr Belyavskiy as King
- Ivan Bortnik as Bedbug
- Valentin Golubenko as Gangreen
- Aleksandr Baluev as Shaman
- Yevgeni Sidikhin as Barcass
- Viktor Sukhorukov as Ambal
- Mikhail Yefremov as Banker
- Viktoriya Tolstoganova as Tamara
- Vyacheslav Razbegaev as Metis
- Polina Sidikhina as daughter of mobster "Longboat"
- Yuriy Dumchev as Valet
- Vyacheslav Molokov as Bobovkin
- Sergey Veksler as Major Litvinov
