= Patient No. 1 =

Georgian movie about late USSR

- Directed by: Rezo Gigineishvili
- Written by: Aleksandr Rodionov; Rezo Gigineishvili
- Produced by: Archil Gelovani; Sergey Yakhontov
- Starring: Aleksandr Filippenko; Inna Churikova; Irina Kupchenko; Vladimir Steklov
- Cinematography: Pyotr Bratersky
- Edited by: Georgiy Isaakyan
- Release date: 2023
- Running time: 105 minutes
- Language: Russian

Patient No. 1 (Russian: Пациент №1) is a 2023 Georgian drama feature film directed by Rezo Gigineishvili. Produced by the Georgian studio Independent Film Project.

== Plot ==
The action of the movie takes place in the late USSR. General Secretary of the CPSU Central Committee Konstantin Chernenko is lying in Moscow Central Clinical Hospital. He is old and infirm, but he holds power tightly. "Power is only taken, it is never given away," he repeats. And this is convenient for both the elites and the security services - as long as the "body" is alive, various groups are scoring political points. The General Secretary is "condemned to life." He is cared for by a young nurse Sasha. Small, fragile and inconspicuous, she bears the heavy burden of responsibility for the life of the country's top official.

== Cast ==
Actor	Role
Aleksandr Filippenko	Konstantin Chernenko
Olga Makeyeva	Sasha
Inna Churikova	Anna Chernenko
Irina Kupchenko	Sasha's mother
Sergey Gilyov	Young man
Igor Chernevich	Rodionov
Vladimir Steklov	Minister-general (based on Nikolai Shchelokov)
Yevgeny Perevlov	Andrei
Andrei Kharybin	Ogarenkov
Sergey Petrov	Anton Vladimirovich
Valentin Samokhin	Anesthesiologist
Sergey Styopin	Urologist

== Production crew ==
- Director: Rezo Gigineishvili
- Screenplay: Aleksandr Rodionov, Rezo Gigineishvili
- Cinematography: Pyotr Bratersky
- Production design: Grigory Pushkin
- Sound engineering: Kirill Vasilenko

== Additional facts ==
- The last role of actress Inna Churikova.
- The working title of the movie is «KU». It is both the initials of the main character and a universal word from the Soviet sci-fi movie Kin-dza-dza! (1986) by Georgiy Daneliya.

== Awards ==
- The Werner Herzog Foundation Film Award
- Best Director Award at the 33rd Cottbus Film Festival
- Award for the best work by a production designer at the Tallinn Black Nights Film Festival (PÖFF)
