= Rezo Gigineishvili =

Russian film director and screenwriter

Rezo Davidovich Gigineishvili
- რევაზ დავითის ძე გიგინეიშვილი
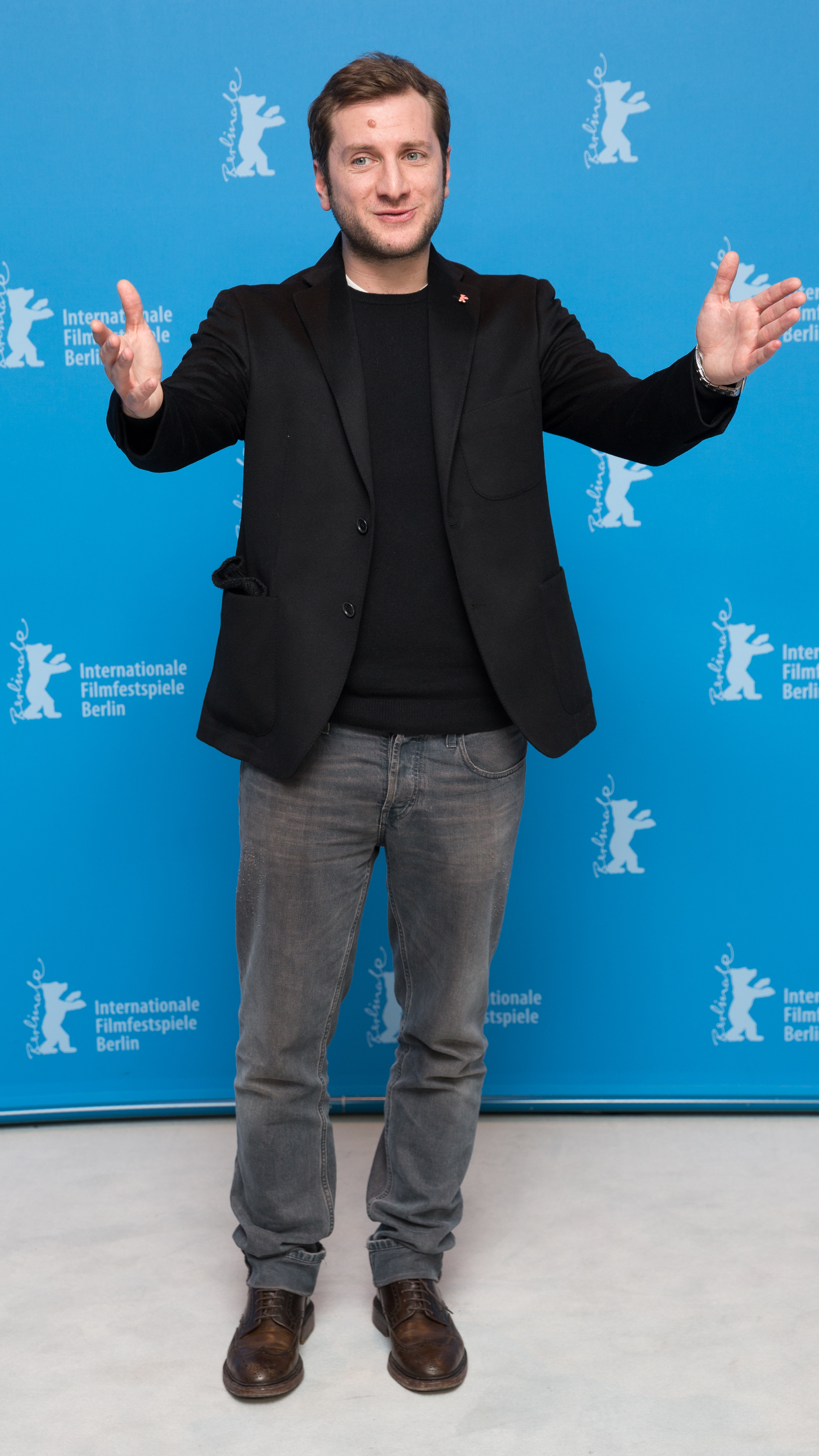
- Born: Revaz Davidovich Gigineishvili; March 19, 1982 (age 44); Tbilisi, Georgian SSR, Soviet Union
- Education: Gerasimov Institute of Cinematography
- Occupations: Film director Screenwriter; Film producer
- Years active: 1997–present
- Organization: Nebo Film Company

Revaz (Rezo) Davidovich Gigineishvili (Georgian: რევაზ დავითის ძე გიგინეიშვილი; born 19 March 1982) is a Russian film director, screenwriter, and producer.

== Biography ==
Gigineishvili was born on 19 March 1982 in Tbilisi to musician Irina Tsikoridze and physician David Gigineishvili, who during the Soviet period headed one of the health resorts in Borjomi. His elder maternal half-sister is Tamara Shengelia, a musician and the wife of journalist Matvey Ganapolsky.

In 1991, he moved to Moscow. Since 1997, he has worked in television.

In 2005, he graduated from the directing department of the Gerasimov Institute of Cinematography (VGIK), studying under Marlen Khutsiev.

He worked as second unit director on Fyodor Bondarchuk’s film 9th Company.

== Personal life ==
Gigineishvili's first marriage was to singer Anastasia Kochetkova. Their daughter, Maria, was born in 2006. The couple divorced in 2009.

In April 2010, he married actress Nadezhda Mikhalkova. They were married in a church ceremony on 29 October 2011 at the Bodbe Monastery in Georgia. They have two children: daughter Nina (born 21 May 2011) and son Ivan (born 21 May 2013). The couple separated in 2017 and officially divorced on 23 October 2017.

== Filmography ==
=== Acting ===
- 2002 — Ice Age — Dato
- 2004 — Moscow. Central District 2 — Sandrik
- 2006 — Nine Months — clinic doctor

=== Director ===
- 2023 — Patient No. 1
- 2022 — The Parish
- 2019 — Sober Driver
- 2017 — About Love. For Adults Only (anthology film)
- 2017 — Hostages
- 2015 — Without Borders
- 2013–2015 — The Last of the Magikyans
- 2012 — Love with an Accent
- 2010 — Without Men
- 2006 — Nine Months
- 2006 — Heat

=== Second unit director ===
- 2009 — The Inhabited Island (two films)

=== Screenwriter ===
- 2019 — Sober Driver
- 2017 — Hostages
- 2015 — Without Borders
- 2012 — Love with an Accent
- 2006 — Heat

=== Producer ===
- 2020 — Guests from the Past
- 2019 — Sober Driver
- 2019 — How I Became Russian
- 2018 — Lapsi
- 2017 — Hostages
- 2016 — Bet on Love
- 2016 — Pushkin
- 2015–2016 — Roof of the World
- 2015 — Without Borders
- 2014 — Son for Father
- 2013–2015 — The Last of the Magikyans
- 2012 — Love with an Accent
- 2010 — Fog
- 2010 — Without Men

=== Music videos ===
- 2004 — Dato — Forgive Me
- Centr ft. Basta — City of Roads
- 2012 — Vlad Sokolovsky — Showers
- 2014 — Soso Pavliashvili — I Kiss Your Hands
- 2015 — Yolka — Home
- 2020 — Yolka & Zvonkiy — Times Are Not Chosen

== Awards ==
- 2017 — Kinotavr Film Festival: Best Director for Hostages
- 2022 — Pilot TV Series Festival: Best Pilot for The Parish
- 2023 — Werner Herzog Film Award for Patient No. 1
