= Mars (2004 film) =

- Directed by: Anna Melikyan
- Written by: Anna Melikyan
- Produced by: Sabina Yeremeeva; Ruben Dishdishyan; Oksana Kostyuchenko
- Starring: Gosha Kutsenko; Nina Kiknadze; Artur Smolyaninov; Yevgenia Dobrovolskaya
- Cinematography: Oleg Lukichev
- Music by: Aleksey Aygi
- Production company: Film Company "Slon" (Elephant)
- Distributed by: Central Partnership
- Release date: 2004
- Running time: 100 minutes
- Country: Russia
- Language: Russian

Mars (Russian: Марс) is a 2004 Russian film, directed and written by Anna Melikian. Set in a small Russian city of Mars, the film tells the story of a professional boxer who has run away from his life to a small Russian town on the coast of the Black Sea.

The story contains elements of surrealism and magical realism. The town's main industry is the manufacture of plush toys, which function as a local currency. The boxer is color blind; his color blindness is portrayed, for example, by a profusion of blue apples.

The city of Mars was formerly called Marks: Марс as opposed to Маркс, the name change being effected by removing one letter from the roof of the railway station.
