= All In (Homeland) =

- Homeland episode
- Episode no.: Season 7 Episode 11
- Directed by: Alex Graves
- Written by: Patrick Harbinson; Chip Johannessen
- Production code: 7WAH11
- Original air date: April 22, 2018
- Running time: 54 minutes

Guest appearances
- James D'Arcy as Thomas Anson; Dylan Baker as Senator Sam Paley; Costa Ronin as Yevgeny Gromov; Catherine Curtin as Sandy Langmore; Elya Baskin as Viktor; Sandrine Holt as Simone Martin; Peter Vack as Clint Prower; Ellen Adair as Janet Bayne; Merab Ninidze as Sergei Mirov; Ari Fliakos as Carter Bennet; Clé Bennett as Doxie Marquis; Damian Young as Jim; Misha Kuznetsov as General Yakushin; Beau Bridges as Vice President Ralph Warner; F. Murray Abraham as Dar Adal

Episode chronology
← Previous "Clarity"	Next → "Paean to the People"
- Homeland season 7

"All In" is the eleventh episode of the seventh season of the American television drama series Homeland, and the 83rd episode overall. It premiered on Showtime on April 22, 2018.

== Plot ==
Senator Paley (Dylan Baker) visits Dar Adal (F. Murray Abraham) in prison, asking for help in discerning what Saul is doing in Russia. Dar looks at the flight manifest and quickly recognizes that Saul and Carrie are organizing a covert operation. Dar then gives him advice on how to track down Saul's task force stateside, which leads them to Clint (Peter Vack). Paley's chief of staff Janet Bayne (Ellen Adair) threatens Clint with legal action. Clint confesses that Saul and Carrie are in Russia to exfiltrate Simone (Sandrine Holt), who is indeed alive. Janet urges Paley to relay this information to the Russian ambassador (Elya Baskin) to sabotage the mission, thereby ending Keane's hopes to salvage her administration. Paley, visibly conflicted, does nothing while Janet is seen talking to the ambassador herself.

In Moscow, Saul (Mandy Patinkin) and Carrie (Claire Danes) sit down for a diplomatic meeting with representatives from the SVR (state intelligence agency) and the GRU (military intelligence agency). Saul insists on the presence of Yevgeny Gromov (Costa Ronin) before proceeding — a pretense to lure Yevgeny away from Simone. When Yevgeny shows up at the meeting, a team led by Anson (James D'Arcy) storms the safehouse where Simone is being kept, but are forced to retreat after being ambushed by guards.

Saul declares the mission a failure, but Carrie is determined to devise a new plan before leaving. She observes dissension between the SVR's General Yakushin (Misha Kuznetsov) and the GRU's Colonel Mirov (Merab Ninidze) during the meeting, and wonders how her team can exploit the tense relationship. Sandy (Catherine Curtin) discovers that Yakushin is hiding $300 million in various U.S. banking institutions.

President Keane (Elizabeth Marvel) gets the news that the Supreme Court has rejected the dismissal of four of her Cabinet secretaries. With that, the Cabinet has the sufficient votes to invoke the 25th Amendment. Vice President Warner (Beau Bridges) arrives at the Oval Office to personally relieve a stunned Keane of her command.

General Yakushin meets with Saul, livid that his bank accounts have been emptied of funds. Saul tells Yakushin that he will return the money in exchange for Simone Martin. When approached by Yakushin, Mirov falsely denies any knowledge of Simone or her whereabouts. Yakushin responds by sending 30 heavily armed, masked men to the GRU headquarters where Simone is being held in an upstairs suite. Chaos and violence ensues as the SVR starts forcefully clearing out the building en masse; Carrie and Anson gain entry clothed like the masked men from the SVR.

Carrie accesses the balcony of Simone's suite via a ledge from a nearby window. Simone holds Carrie at gunpoint but Carrie convinces Simone to come with her, making her understand she is now a massive liability to the Russians who will consider her expendable. Yevgeny sees "Simone" taken away by Anson and orders the car to be followed, but is actually duped by Carrie wearing Simone's scarf and a black wig. The real Simone, wearing a blonde wig, safely escapes in another car with Bennet (Ari Fliakos).

== Production ==
The episode was directed by Alex Graves and co-written by executive producers Patrick Harbinson and Chip Johannessen. Scenes taking place in Moscow were filmed in Budapest, Hungary.

== Reception ==
=== Reviews ===
The episode received an approval rating of 100% on the review aggregator Rotten Tomatoes based on 9 reviews.

The A.V. Club's Scott Von Doviak rated the episode "A−", citing the "heart-pounding action". Shirley Li of Entertainment Weekly gave the episode a "B+" grade, calling it "thrilling" and "an hour of Homeland that felt capital-B BIG".

=== Ratings ===
The original broadcast was watched by 1.39 million viewers.
