= Ravshana Kurkova =

Russian actress (born 1980)

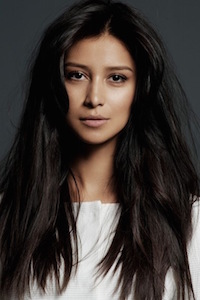
- Ravshana Kurkova, actress
- Born: Ravshana Bahramovna Matchanova; 22 August 1980 (age 45); Tashkent, Uzbek SSR, Soviet Union
- Citizenship: Uzbekistan; Russian
- Occupation: Actress
- Years active: 2003–present
- Spouse(s): Semyon Kurkov (divorced) Artyom Tkachenko (m. 2004; div. 2008)

Ravshana Bahramovna Kurkova (Uzbek: Ravshana Bahromovna Kurkova, Russian: Равшана Бахрамовна Куркова; born 22 August 1980) is an Uzbek-Russian actress of theater, film and dubbing, and producer. She has appeared in more than thirty films since 2003.

== Biography ==
Ravshana Matchanova was born in Tashkent in an Uzbek acting family. She starred in the arthausal philosophical drama of Rashid Malikov "Kirk Kulok Siri", filmed at the film studio "Uzbekfilm" in 1992.

In the eighth grade, her parents transferred her to another Tashkent lyceum, a branch of the University of London, where all subjects were taught in English. In the late 1990s, Ravshana moved to Moscow, where she entered the philological faculty of the Moscow State Pedagogical University.

After receiving the diploma of higher education she worked on television as an editor of the talk show, an assistant to the director. She listened to the course of lectures in the framework of High Courses for Scriptwriters and Film Directors and studied acting skills under the guidance of Tatyana Pyshnova, of the teacher of the Mikhail Shchepkin Higher Theatre School.

Ravshana Kurkova is also known as a theatrical actress. She was busy in the play - plastic drama "Ungiers" by Oleg Glushkov, premiered in 2010. Performed the main roles in theatrical productions of Ivan Vyrypaev "Unbearably long embrace" and "Illusion" in the Moscow theater "Practice".

From 2014 to 2016, Ravshana cooperated with the well-known brands Intimissimi and Calzedonia. As the official envoy of Calzedonia, Ravshana Kurkova annually represented Russia at the Calzedonia Summer Show in Verona.

== Career ==
In the 12-episode series And we have in the yard ... directed by Olga Muzaleva (Channel One Russia), Ravshana performed the role of Mavlyuda, a doctor, a resident of Samarkand, the mother of three children who came to Moscow to look for the missing husband and forced to work as a janitor. According to journalist Andrei Arkhangelsky, "For the first time on the screen was created the image of a migrant - not a hero sketch, not a comic ornament, but a full-fledged hero."

In 2016, the premiere of the immersion thriller Maxim Didenko "Black Russian" took place on the motives of the novel "Dubrovsky" by Alexander Pushkin, where Ravshana played the main female role - Masha Troyekurova. The role of Dubrovsky was performed by the former husband of actors Artyom Tkachenko.

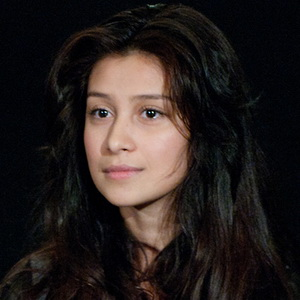
Ravshana Kurkova at the presentation of the movie Moms in February 2012.

== Personal life ==
Ravshana Matchanova, the first spouse of the actress was photographer Semyon Kurkov, after the divorce, Ravshana Kurkova kept his surname. She was in her second marriage to Russian actor Artyom Tkachenko from 2004 to 2008.

== Selected filmography ==
| Year | Title | Role | Notes |
|---|---|---|---|
| 2007 | Dead Daughters | Rita | |
| 2009 | The Temptation of St. Tony | Nadezhda | |
| 2010 | Love in the Big City 2 | Elena | |
| 2012 | Moms | Kristina | |
| 2013 | What Men Do! | Alisa | |
| 2015 | About Love | Olya | |
| 2018 | White Crow | Nureev's mother | |
| 2018 | Call DiCaprio! | Roksana Kurkina | |
| 2019 | The Brave | Elena | |
| 2019 | Abigail | Stella | |
| 2019 | The Balkan Line | Vera | |
| 2020 | Nezhnost | Liana | |
| 2021 | Chernobyl: Abyss | Dina | |
