= Merab Ninidze =

Georgian actor (born 1965)

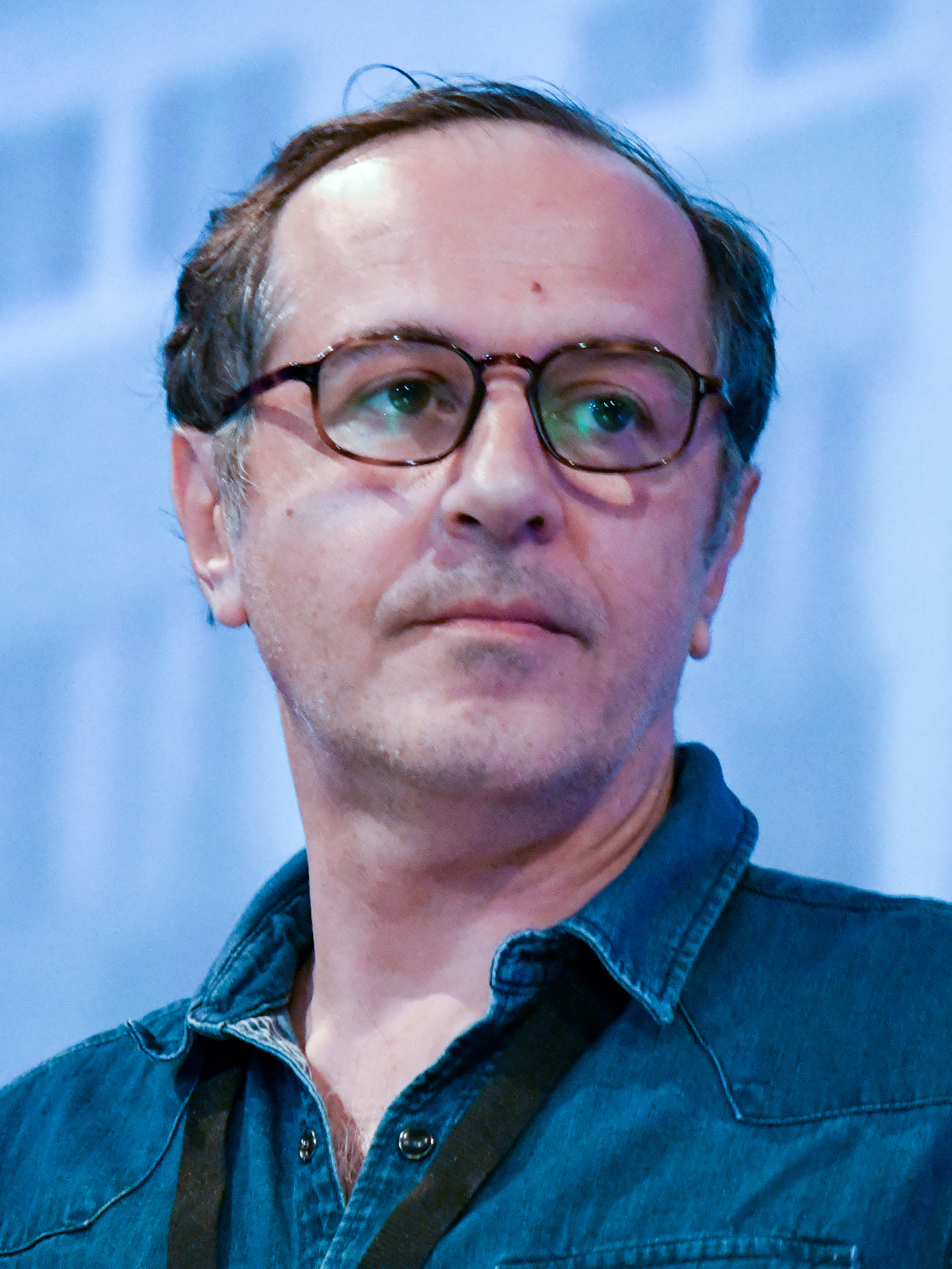
- Ninidze at Crossing Europe 2018
- Born: 3 November 1965 (age 60); Tbilisi, Georgian Soviet Socialist Republic, Soviet Union (now Georgia)
- Occupation: Actor
- Years active: 1984-present

Merab Ninidze (Georgian: მერაბ ნინიძე; born 3 November 1965) is a Georgian actor. Internationally, he is known for the roles of Walter Redlich in Nowhere in Africa, Oleg Penkovsky in The Courier and Cardinal Giulio Sabbadin in Conclave.

== Career ==
=== Early career ===
Merab Ninidze was born on 3 November 1965 in Tbilisi, Georgian SSR, USSR. He grew up in an artistic family. His grandmother, Zeinab Ghoghoberidze, was a music teacher and introduced him to music, and he then went on to study classical music for seven years. His grandfather, Sergo Akhaladze, was a theatre director, and Ninidze was involved in theatre from a very young age. From 1972 to 1982 he attended Tbilisi Classical Gymnasium.

At the age of thirteen, Ninidze auditioned for the part of Prince Edward in Shakespeare's Richard III at Rustaveli State Academic Theatre in Tbilisi, which was directed by Robert Sturua and premiered in 1979. The production had great success, touring the UK three times, taking part in Edinburgh Festival, Glasgow Mayfest and The Roundhouse in London. From 1982 to 1985 he studied acting at the Shota Rustaveli Theatre and Georgia State Film University under the tutelage of Gizo Jordania, which led to him becoming a full-time member of the Shota Rustaveli Theatre Company. Also, he had successful collaborations in many of Jordania's later productions, such as The Diary of Anne Frank in 1989, David Kldiashvili’s Step-Mother in 1989 (which toured the UK in 1989–1990) and Hamlet in 1992. After Hamlet premiered in 1992, Civil War broke out in Georgia leading to his emigration, and he only returned to the theatre’s stage playing Shylock in The Merchant of Venice in 2003 (dir. Levan Tsuladze). He also took part in Georg Büchner’s Leonce and Lena (dir. Nana Kvaskhvadze) in 1991.

Ninidze's first film role was in Tengiz Abuladze’s 1984 film Repentance, which won three prizes at the 40th Cannes Film Festival, including the Grand Prize of the Jury. Since then he has appeared in films by many Georgian directors. As the Civil War broke out in Georgia, he was offered the opportunity to work with Austrian director Goran Rebic. He spent several months in Vienna playing a Serbian war survivor in Rebic’s film Yugofilm, which subsequently led to his emigration at the age of 25.

=== Later career ===
For the last 20 years, Ninidze has been actively portraying characters in English, Russian, and German language films and TV series. He has appeared in numerous German films by various directors. Nowhere in Africa (dir. Caroline Link), with Ninidze as lead, was awarded an Academy Award for Best Foreign Language Film in 2002. Ninidze has received several European and Russian film prizes, and films in which he has participated are shown regularly at major film festivals. Throughout his career, he has also been active in Russian cinema and TV, landing major roles in Aleksei German’s Paper Soldier and Under Electric Clouds, Bakhtyar Khudojnazarov’s Luna Papa, and others. His recent credits in TV series include Berlin Station in 2015, BBC’s McMafia in 2018 (dir. by James Watkins), and Homeland (2018). In 2017 he attended the Berlinale Film Festival for two of his most recent Georgian films – Hostages (dir. Rezo Gigineishvili) and My Happy Family (dir. Nana Ekvtimishvili and Simon Gross), which also won prizes in various film festivals around the world. In May 2017, theatre and film director Kornel Mundruczo’s film Jupiter’s Moon was shown in the main competition at Cannes Film Festival. In September 2017, Ninidze won the Best Actor award at the Batumi International Film Festival for his role in Jupiter’s Moon.

== Personal life ==
Ninidze's autobiographical novel Everywhere, even in Africa was published in 2015.

== Filmography ==
| Year | Title | Role | Notes |
|---|---|---|---|
| 1984 | Repentance | Tornike | |
| 1985 | Sapekhuri | | |
| 1985 | Ert patara qalaqshi | | |
| 1987 | Oromtriali | | |
| 1987 | Pesvebi | | |
| 1989 | Miakhloeba | | |
| 1991 | O, ra tkbilia ganshorebis es nazi sevda | | |
| 1994 | The Quality of Mercy | Nikolai | |
| 1994 | Gza Chalaurisaken | | |
| 1995 | Halbe Welt | Schwätzer | |
| 1997 | Jugofilm | Sasha | |
| 1997 | Die Schuld der Liebe | Unbekannter Mann | |
| 1998 | Suzie Washington | Resa Madani | |
| 1998 | In Heaven | Levi | |
| 1999 | Luna Papa | Alik | |
| 2000 | England! | Pavel | |
| 2001 | Bride of the Wind | Russian Soldier | |
| 2001 | Ene mene muh - und tot bist du | | |
| 2001 | Nowhere in Africa | Walter Redlich | |
| 2002 | Ikarus | Milan | |
| 2004 | Cattolica | Martin | |
| 2008 | The Rainbowmaker | Datho | |
| 2008 | Paper Soldier | Doctor Daniil Pokrovsky | Nominated – Nika Award for Best Actor; Nominated – White Elephant Award for Best Actor |
| 2008 | Mediator | Hitman | |
| 2010 | Der Kameramörder | Thomas | |
| 2011 | Wintertochter | Alexej | |
| 2011 | Mein bester Feind | Moritz Haiden | |
| 2011 | Four Days in May | Major | |
| 2012 | The Fourth State | Sagalayev | |
| 2012 | Invasion | Konstantin | |
| 2012 | Lyubov s aktsentom | | |
| 2014 | Ch/B | Nurik | |
| 2015 | Die blauen Stunden | Der Maler | |
| 2015 | Under Electric Clouds | Nikolai | |
| 2015 | Sindrom Petrushki | Boris | |
| 2015 | Deutschland 83 | Alexei Stepanov | 4 episodes |
| 2015 | Bridge of Spies | Soviet Main Interrogator | |
| 2016 | Lou Andreas-Salomé, The Audacity to be Free | Friedrich Carl Andreas | |
| 2016 | Berlin Station | Aleksandre Iosava | 5 episodes |
| 2017 | My Happy Family | Soso | |
| 2017 | Hostages | Levan | |
| 2017 | Jupiter's Moon | Gábor Stern | |
| 2018 | McMafia | Vadim Kalyagin | 8 episodes |
| 2018 | Homeland | Sergei Mirov | Season 7, episodes 9, 11, 12 |
| 2019 | Russian Whispers | Viktor | |
| 2019 | Treadstone | Yuri Leniov (Present Day) | 3 episodes |
| 2020 | Freud | Josef Breuer | 2 episodes |
| 2020 | The Courier | Oleg Penkovsky | Nominated – BIFA for Best Supporting Actor |
| 2021 | Without Remorse | Andre Vaseliev | |
| 2021 | House Arrest | David | |
| 2024 | Conclave | Cardinal Sabbadin | |
| 2025 | A Working Man | Yuri | |
| TBA | The Price of Peace | Joseph Stalin | Filming |
