= Useful Idiot (Homeland) =

- Homeland episode
- Episode no.: Season 7 Episode 9
- Directed by: Nelson McCormick
- Written by: Debora Cahn
- Production code: 7WAH09
- Original air date: April 8, 2018
- Running time: 51 minutes

Guest appearances
- Dylan Baker as Senator Sam Paley; Costa Ronin as Yevgeny Gromov; Sandrine Holt as Simone Martin; Ellen Adair as Janet Bayne; Catherine Curtin as Sandy Langmore; Peter Vack as Clint Prower; Mackenzie Astin as Bill Dunn; Merab Ninidze as Sergei Mirov; Thomas G. Waites as Clayton; James Lloyd Reynolds as Jim Lippard

Episode chronology
← Previous "Lies, Amplifiers, Fucking Twitter"	Next → "Clarity"
- Homeland season 7

"Useful Idiot" is the ninth episode of the seventh season of the American television drama series Homeland, and the 81st episode overall. It premiered on Showtime on April 8, 2018.

== Plot ==
Yevgeny (Costa Ronin) and Simone (Sandrine Holt) drive to a private airfield to depart for Russia, but Yevgeny receives a call from Clayton (Thomas G. Waites), another Russian agent, who informs him that Dante (Morgan Spector) has not checked in for days. Despite Simone's protests, Yevgeny opts to stay behind to find Dante, not wanting to risk one of his agents being compromised.

When Dante awakens in the hospital, Carrie (Claire Danes) persuades him to further elaborate on his collusion with Simone and the Russians. Dante tells her of a secret Twitter code — "Darwin loves Bitcoin" — which acts as an emergency signal meant to alert Yevgeny's agents to dissolve their network. Saul (Mandy Patinkin) presents a plan to Keane (Elizabeth Marvel) which pushes legal boundaries: to broadcast the code by compromising Twitter's servers, and violate the privacy of U.S. citizens by tracking who posts confirmations in response to the tweet; Keane reluctantly agrees. Keane and Wellington (Linus Roache) bring Senator Paley (Dylan Baker) into the loop, detailing Simone's and Dante's roles in the elaborate Russian scheme to undermine the U.S. government, and Paley's own unwitting role in the subterfuge.

Clayton informs Yevgeny that Dante was arrested and is now in the hospital. When the Twitter code is deployed by Clint (Peter Vack), Yevgeny realizes that Dante has to be cooperating with authorities. He calls his handler, Mirov (Merab Ninidze), to request aid in breaching the hospital and killing Dante, but is only told to stand down. Yevgeny ignores the order and meets Clayton at the hospital. Yevgeny then shoots Clayton in the abdomen and drags him inside. As he hands Clayton off to the doctors, he swipes one of their ID cards. He uses the card to enter Dante's room.

Meanwhile, Carrie goes to Maggie's house to try and reconcile, but instead learns from Bill (Mackenzie Astin) that Maggie is meeting a lawyer to seek custody of Franny. When Dante accuses Yevgeny of poisoning him, he denies it and tells Dante to call Carrie and ask her if she was responsible. Dante calls Carrie, who is picking up Franny from school early. He realizes that Carrie is lying to him, but nonetheless he tells Carrie that Yevgeny is in the room with him. Yevgeny smothers Dante with a pillow. Carrie opts to leave Franny at school in her rush to the hospital, but Franny runs after her and is almost accidentally run over by her mother in the parking lot. After learning that Dante is dead, Carrie has a psychotic break at the hospital as she is overwhelmed by thoughts of nearly killing Franny, as well as flashbacks to the deaths of Brody, Aayan and Quinn.

== Production ==
The episode was directed by Nelson McCormick and written by co-executive producer Debora Cahn.

== Trivia ==
Useful idiot is a term attributed to Vladimir Lenin, principally in Soviet use, for a person overtly supporting the interests of one country (e.g., the USSR) in another (e.g., a member of the overt Communist Party of the second country). Soviet intelligence practice was to avoid such people in the actual clandestine operations, regarding them at most useful as distractions to the counterintelligence services.

== Reception ==
=== Reviews ===
The episode received an approval rating of 78% on the review aggregator Rotten Tomatoes based on 9 reviews.

Brian Tallerico of New York Magazine rated the episode 3 out of 5 stars, evaluating it as "a perfectly fine hour that’s something of a letdown after the intensity of the last few episodes, even as it puts interesting pieces in place for the final stretch". Entertainment Weekly's Shirley Li rated the episode a "B+", noting that "this episode dramatically upped the stakes".

=== Ratings ===
The original broadcast was watched by 1.24 million viewers.
