= Aleksandr Robak =

Russian actor, director, film producer (born 1973)

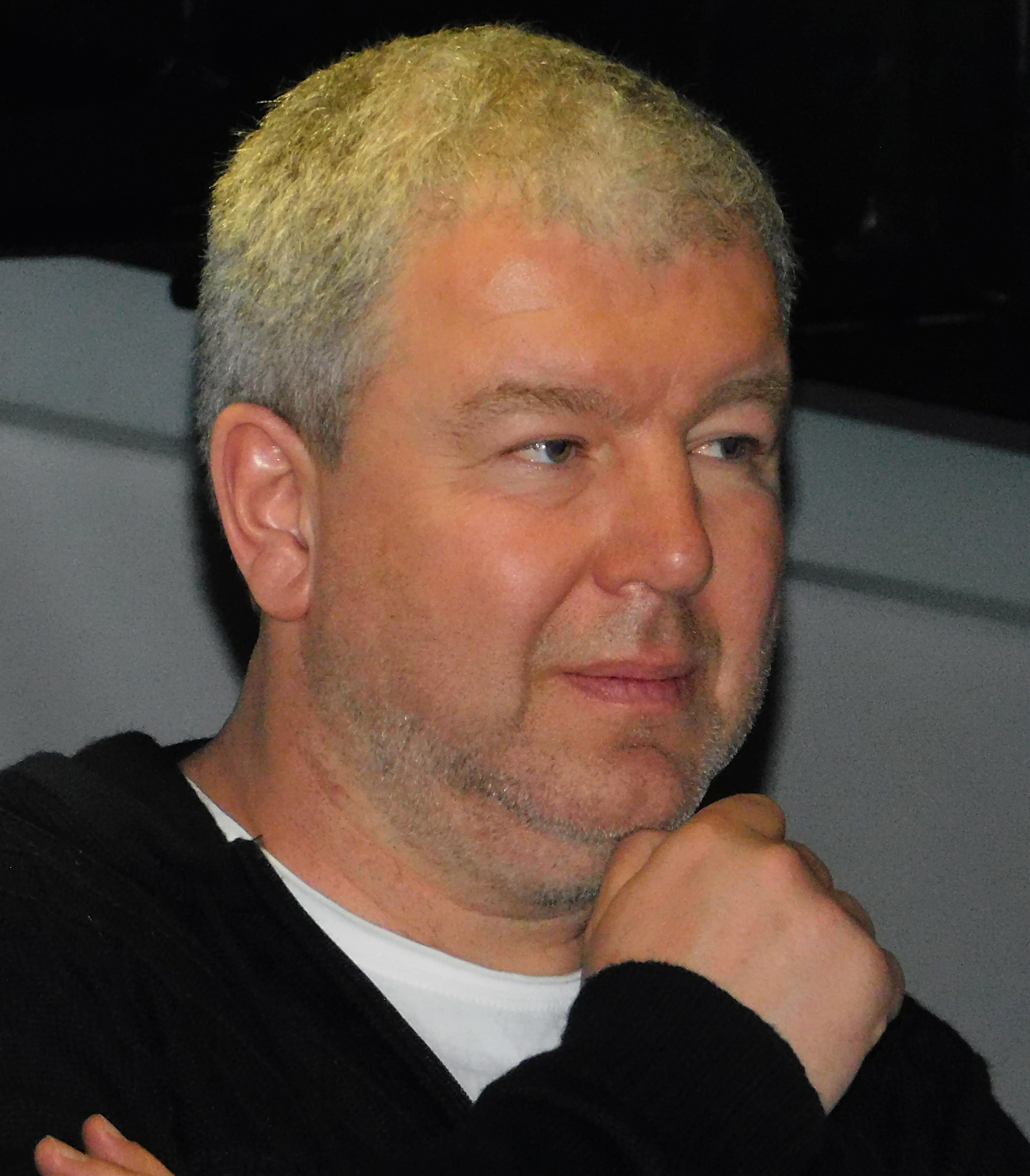
- Born: 28 December 1973 (age 52); Zlatoust, Soviet Union
- Occupation: Actor
- Years active: 1999-present

Aleksandr Removich Robak (Russian: Александр Рэмович Робак; born 28 December 1973) is a Russian actor, director, film producer. He appeared in more than fifty films since 1999.

== Selected filmography ==
Year	Title	Role	Notes
2005	Yesenin	Ivan Pribludny	TV
2010	Kandagar	Mark	
2011	Yolki 2	Alexander Korovin	
2013	The Geographer Drank His Globe Away	Budkin	
2013	Yolki 3	Alexander Korovin	
2015	About Love	policeman 2	
2016	Yolki 5	Alexander Korovin	
2018	House Arrest	Ivan Samsonov	
2019	To the Lake	Lyonya, Sergey's neighbor	TV
2020	Call-center	Maksim Valyeryevich	TV
2023	Snegir	Gennady	
2024	Macron	Ashikhmin	TV
