= Gosha Kutsenko =

Russian actor, producer, singer, poet and screenwriter (born 1967)

- Гоша Куценко
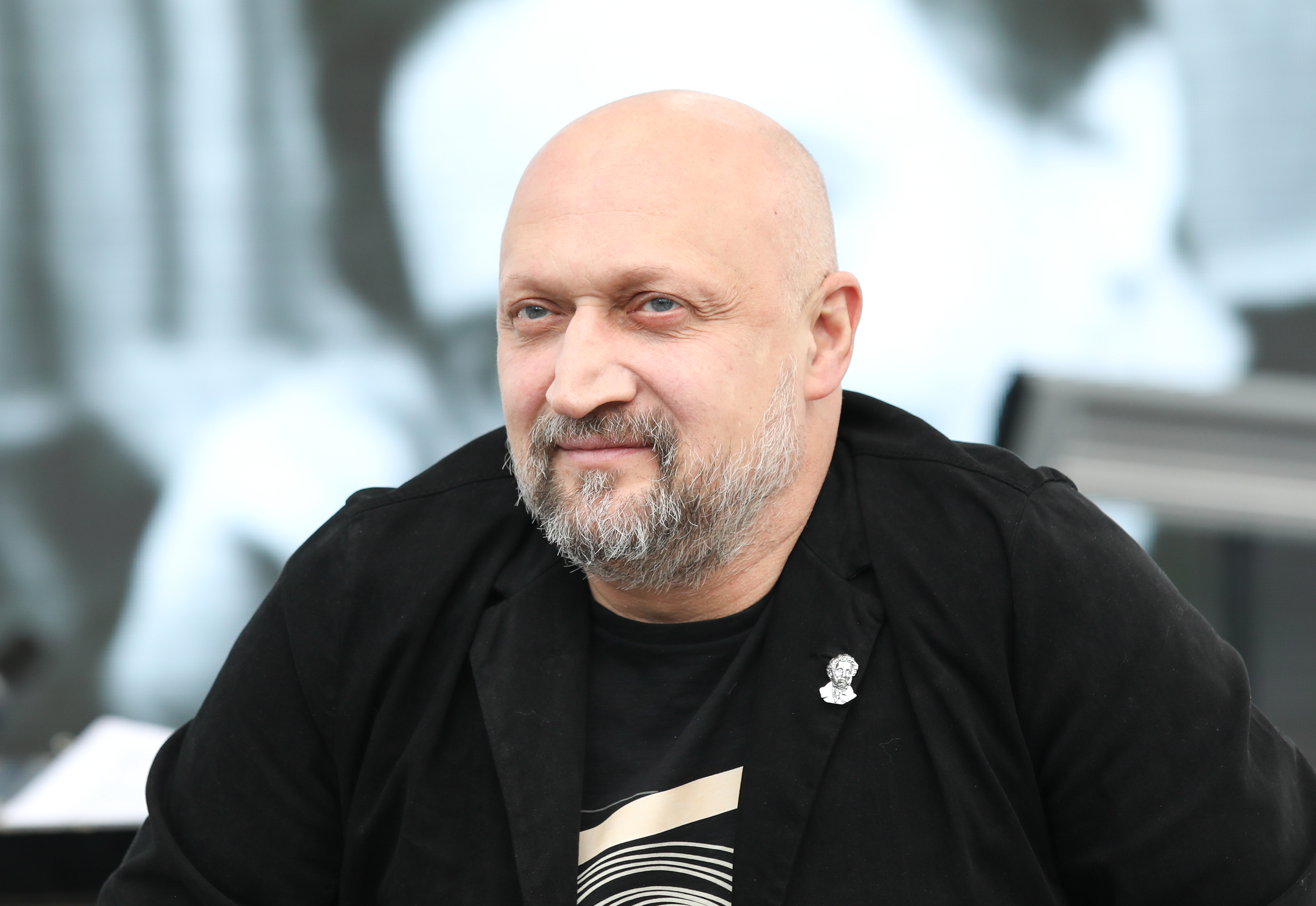
- Gosha Kutsenko in 2023
- Born: Yuriy Georgiyevich Kutsenko; 20 May 1967 (age 59); Zaporizhia, Ukrainian SSR, Soviet Union
- Education: Lviv Polytechnic; MIREA
- Occupations: Actor, producer, singer, screenwriter, poet
- Years active: 1991–present
- Spouse: Mariya Poroshina (1992 – 1997; divorced)
- Partner: Irina Skrinichenko (2001–2009)
- Children: Polina Kutsenko
- Website: kutsenko.ru

Yuriy Georgiyevich Kutsenko (Russian: Ю́рий Гео́ргиевич Куце́нко; born 20 May 1967), better known as Gosha Kutsenko (Russian: Гоша Куценко), is a Russian actor, producer, singer, poet, and screenwriter. In 2008, he joined the United Russia political party. Kutsenko has appeared in high-profile films such as Mama Don't Cry, Antikiller, Night Watch, Lubov-Morkov, and Echelon Conspiracy.

In 2018, he was a campaign representative of Moscow mayoral candidate Sergei Sobyanin.

Since June 2018, he has been listed in the Myrotvorets website database for attempting to visit Crimea and for recognizing Crimea as Russian.

== Selected filmography ==
Year	Title	Role	Notes
1993	Dreams	Tailor	
1993	Children of Iron Gods	Fyodor	
1994	Noktyurn dlya barabana i mototsikla		
1995	Pod znakom skorpiona		
1995	Bram Stoker's Burial of the Rats	New Priest	Television film
1998	Mama Don't Cry	Arthur	
1999	8 ½ $		
2002	In Motion	Guest	
2000	Khoroshie i plokhie		
2002	The Road		
2002	Spetsnaz		TV miniseries
2002	April	Artur	
2002	Antikiller	Major Korenev, aka Fox	
2002	Stereoblood	Vladimir	
2003	Antikiller 2: Antiterror	Major Korenev	
2004	Night Watch	Ignat	
2004	Mars	Boris Nikitin	
2005	Deadly Force		TV series
2005	The Turkish Gambit	Ismail-Bei	
2005	Nochnoy bazar		
2005	From 180 and Up	Alik	
2005	The Fall of the Empire	Gibson	TV miniseries
2005	Mama Don't Cry 2	Artur	
2005	Garpastum	Aleksandr Blok	
2005	Yesenin	Yakov Blumkin	TV miniseries
2005	Posledniy uik-end	The Rabid	
2005	Okhota na izyubrya	Luchkov	TV miniseries
2006	Day Watch	Ignat	
2006	Sdvig		
2006	Gerry in the backdoor	Naked man	
2006	Savages	Ay-yay	
2007	Gloss		
2007	Paragraph 78	Gudvin	
2007	Lubov morkov	Andrei Golubev	
2007	Derzkie dni	Captain	
2008	Vsyo mogut koroli		
2008	Indigo	Sukhanov	
2008	13 months	Gleb	
2008	The Inhabited Island	Veper	
2008	Lubov morkov 2	Sukhanov	Andrei
2009	Echelon Conspiracy	Russian General	
2009	The Book of Masters	Koshchey Bessmertnyy	
2009	Antikiller D.K: Lyubov bez pamyati	Lis	
2010	Ironiya lyubvi	General	
2010	Compensation		
2011	Lubov Morkov 3	Andrey Golubev	
2011	Samka		
2011	Rzhevsky versus Napoleon		
2011	The Darkest Hour	Matvei	
2011	Yolki 2		
2011	Fairytale.Is	Penkulturnik	
2012	Suicides	Mimus	
2012	August Eighth	himself	
2013	Yolki 3	Professor Andrei Nikolaevich	
2015	Famous Ethology	Roman	
2016	Yolki 5	Professor Andrei Nikolaevich	
2017	Full Cast & Crew	Lyosha	
2017	Time to live, time to die (Short)		
2017	Posledniy ment (TV Series)-Episode #3.52	Police Captain Alexey Divov	
2018	House Arrest	General Georgy Kruglov	
2018	Kanikuly prezidenta		
2018	Lyubovnitsy	Oleg	
2018	The Brave (aka Lazarat)	Kolo	
2018	Grafomafiya	Sizukhin	
2025	Red Silk	Fyodor Kornilov	

Producer
Year	Film	Notes
2006	Savages	
2018	The Balkan Line	

screenwriter
Year	Film	Notes
2006	Antikiller D.K: Lyubov bez pamyati	
