= Pavel Ruminov =

Russian film director (born 1974)

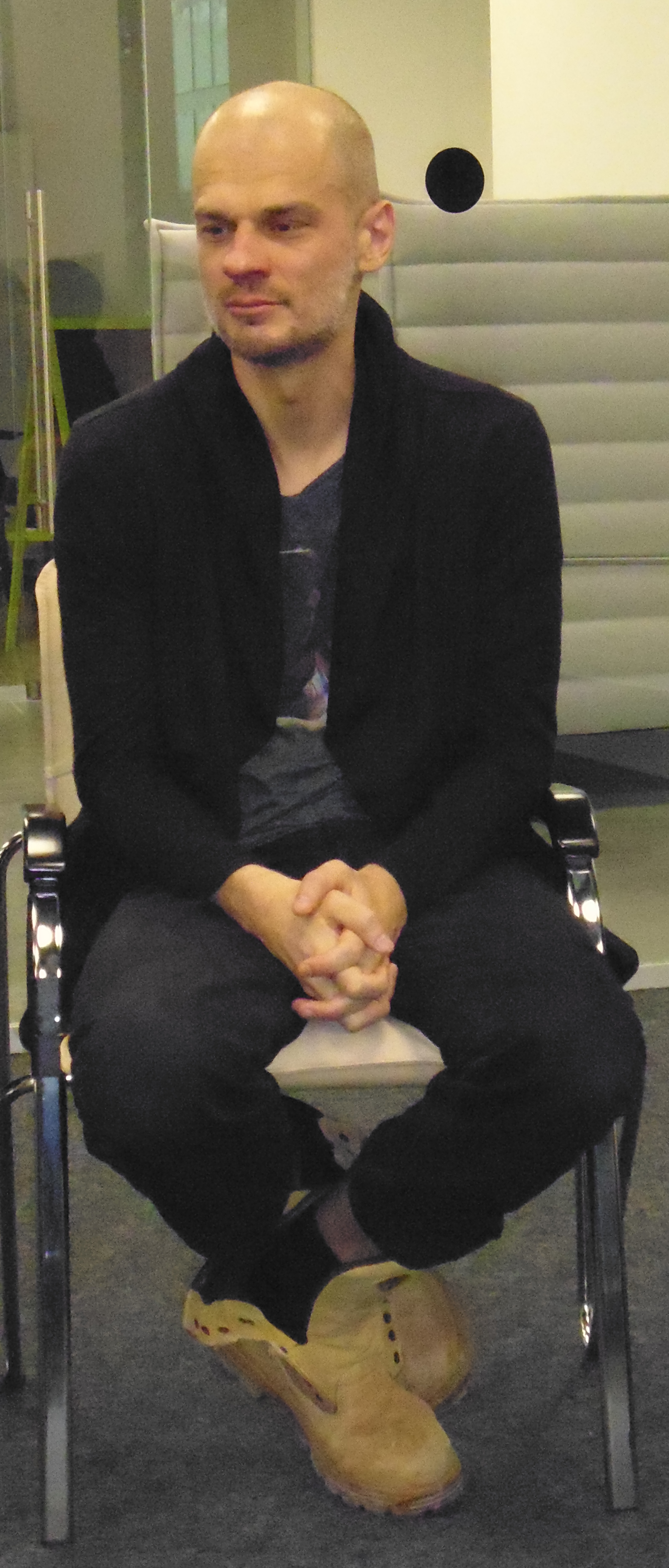
- Павел Руминов 2016 год
- Born: Pavel Yurevich Ruminov; 25 November 1974 (age 51); Vladivostok, Russian Soviet Federative Socialist Republic, Soviet Union
- Occupations: film director, screenwriter, editor and composer
- Years active: 2004–present
- Website: ruminov-live.livejournal.com

Pavel Yurevich Ruminov (Russian: Па́вел Ю́рьевич Руми́нов; born 25 November 1974) is a Russian film director. He began his career in Vladivostok directing music videos for Russian acts such as Mumiy Troll and Zemfira before relocating to Moscow. He is best known in Russia for the Internet-based hype surrounding his first feature film Dead Daughters, where he tried to marry horror and arthouse cinema effectively. The film divided critics in Russia, some praised its style and message, others found the structure of the movie to be very strange. He sold the remake rights for Dead Daughters to the Hollywood studio Gold Circle Films but no remake has been produced. His second film Circumstances, a romantic comedy with dark overtones, was released in Russia in September 2009, but failed at the box-office. In 2012 his third movie Ya Budu Ryadom won the gran-prix for the best film at 23rd open film festival Kinotavr, the largest national film festival in Russia. Besides professional cinema, Pavel also makes amateur movies of his family and friends which are available on his website at YouTube.

Ruminov once compared himself favourably to such filmmakers as Steven Spielberg, Stanley Kubrick, Jean-Luc Godard, and M. Night Shyamalan. He was the only Russian contributor to Cinema Now, Taschen's 2008 survey of contemporary cinema.

== Filmography ==
- About Love. For Adults Only (2017, anthology film)
- Dislike (2016)
- Ya Budu Ryadom (I Will Be By Your Side) (2011)
- Obstoyatelstva (Circumstances) (2008)
- Myortvye docheri (Dead Daughters) (2007)
- Chelovek, kotoryy molchal (Silent Man) (2004)
- Kluchevoe deystvie (Deadline) (2004)
- Stereoblood (2002)
