= Anna Melikian =

Russian-Armenian filmmaker

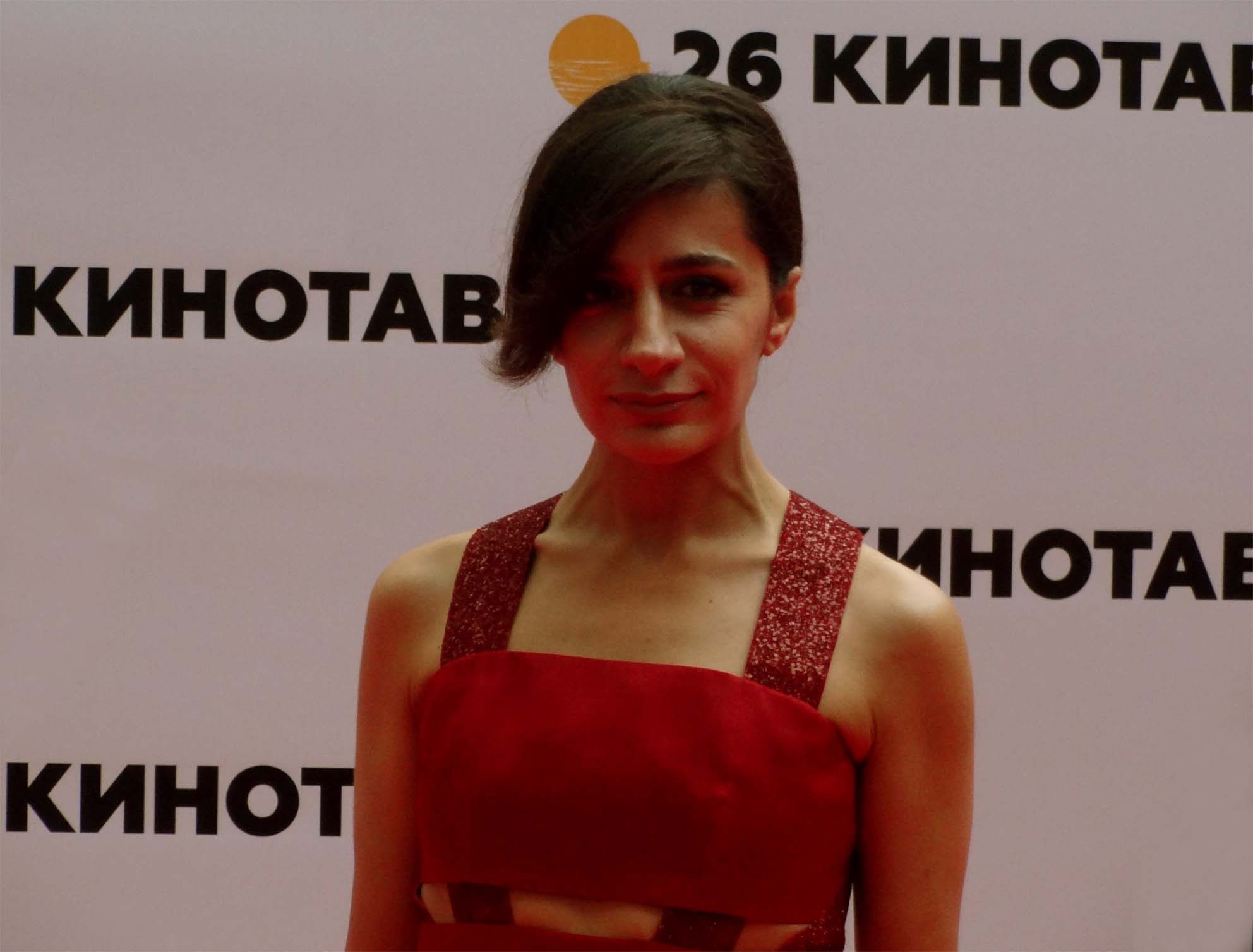
- Anna Melikian in 2015
- Born: February 8, 1976 (age 50); Baku, Azerbaijan Soviet Union
- Occupations: film and TV director/ producer

Anna Melikian (Armenian: Աննա Մելիքյան; Russian: Анна Меликян; born February 8, 1976) is a Russian film and TV director/ producer whose work has been recognized with various awards at major international film festivals. After her participation at 2018 Sundance Film Festival she was listed in the TOP 10 of most perspective film directors by Variety magazine.

== Biography ==
Anna Melikian was born in Baku, Azerbaijan. She spent her childhood in Yerevan, Armenia. At the age of 17 she moved to Moscow, Russia.

Melikian studied at the All-Russian State University of Cinematography film school in Moscow (classes of Prof. Sergey Solovyov and Valery Rubinchik), where she was awarded the St. Anna prize for Poste restante (2000).

In the 1990s, she worked for a while on television as a director of several programs and as a writer of video commercials and TV projects.

After the graduation she was granted by GosKino Russian organization, made various documental and TV films. In 2008 Melikian's Mermaid (2007) was awarded by the Berlin International Film Festival Prize. In 2014, her Star brought her Best Director award at Kinotavr.

Her 2015 film About Love brought her the Main Prize and the Prize of Film Distributors Jury at the Kinotavr film festival as well as the Golden Eagle Awards as the Best Feature Film.

Since 2005 all her films are shot under her private brand – the cinema company Magnum.

== Awards ==
- Berlin International Film Festival, 2008, FIPRESCI Prize for: Rusalka (2007)
- Clermont-Ferrand International Short Film Festival, 2001, Special Jury Award for Poste restante (2000)
- Golden Apricot Yerevan International Film Festival, 2008, Feature Film for Rusalka (2007)
- Karlovy Vary International Film Festival, 2008, Independent Camera Award for Rusalka (2007)
- Melbourne International Film Festival, 2001, City of Melbourne Award for Best Short Experimental Poste restante (2000)
- Sofia International Film Festival, 2008, Grand Prix for Rusalka (2007)
- Sundance Film Festival, 2008, Directing Award, World Cinema - Dramatic for Rusalka (2007)
- Kinotavr, 2014, Directing Award, Star (2014)
- The Golden Unicorn Awards, 2016, Best short film "8"
- The Golden Eagle Award, 2016, Best movie, About love (2015)

== Filmography ==
=== Director ===
- Fairy (Фея, Feya) 2020
- Tenderness (Нежность) 2020
- The Three (Трое) 2020
- About Love. For Adults Only 2020, anthology film
- About Love (Про любовь, Pro lyubov') 2015
- Star (Звезда, Zvezda) 2014
- Mermaid (Русалка, Rusalka) 2007
- Mars (Марс) 2004
- Poste restante (До Востребования) 2000

=== Producer ===
- The Ghost (2008) (producer)
- Bride at any Cost (2009) (producer)
- Semeyka Ady (2007) (co-producer)

=== Writer ===
- Mermaid 2007
- Mars 2004
