= Nika Award for Discovery of the Year =

Russian film award

- Country: Russia
- Presented by: Russian Academy of Cinema Arts and Science
- First award: 2002
- Currently held by: Philipp Yuryev for The Whaler Boy (2025)
- Website: Official site of the Russian Academy of Cinema Arts and Science

The Nika Award for Discovery of the Year (Russian: Ника за «Открытие года») is given annually by the Russian Academy of Cinema Arts and Science and presented at the Nika Awards.

In 2022, nominees were announced, but award ceremony was postponed and, eventually, cancelled.

The award ceremony was also cancelled in 2023.

In the following lists, the titles and names in bold with a light blue background are the winners and recipients respectively; those not in bold are the nominees. The year with a light pink background is the one when nominees were announced, but the Award ceremony was not held.

== Winners and nominees ==
=== 2000s ===
Year	Recipient	International title	Original title	Transliterated title (per BGN/PCGN standard)	Ref(s)
**2002**	**Vladislav Galkin (actor)**	**In August of 1944**	**В августе 44-го…**	**V avguste 44-go…**	
2002	Natalya Gugueva (documentary film director)	The Forsage	Форсаж	Forsazh	
2002	Alexander Kott (film director)	Two Drivers	Ехали два шофёра	Ekhali dva shofoera	
**2003**	**Igor Petrenko (actor)**	**The Star**	**Звезда**	**Zvezda**	
**2003**	**Filipp Yankovsky (film director)**	**The Motion**	**В движении**	**V dvizhenii**	
2003	Vera Storozheva (film director)	Sky. Plane. Girl	Небо. Самолёт. Девушка	Nebo. Samoleot. Devushka	
**2004**	**Aleksei German Jr. (film director)**	**The Last Train**	**Последний поезд**	**Posledniy poezd**	
2004	Andrey Zvyagintsev (film director)	The Return	Возвращение	Vozvrashcheniye	
2004	Gennady Sidorov (film director)	Old Women	Старухи	Starukhi	
**2005**	**Alyona Babenko (actress)**	**A Driver for Vera**	**Водитель для Веры**	**Voditel dlya Very**	
2005	Polina Agureeva (actress)	Long Farewell	Долгое прощание	Dolgoe proshchanie	
2005	Marina Razbezhkina (film director)	Harvest Time	Время жатвы	Vremya zhatvy	
2005	Daniil Spivakovsky (actor)	My Step Brother Frankenstein	Мой сводный брат Франкенштейн	Moy svodnyy brat Frankenshteyn	
**2006**	**Andrei Kravchuk (film director)**	**The Italian**	**Итальянец**	**Italyanets**	
2006	Fyodor Bondarchuk (film director)	The 9th Company	9 рота	9 rota	
2006	Pavel Sanayev (film director)	Last Weekend	Последний уик-энд	Posledniy uik-end	
**2007**	**Ivan Vyrypaev (film director)**	**Euphoria**	**Эйфория**	**Eyforiya**	
2007	Oksana Bychkova (film director)	Piter FM	Питер FM	Piter FM	
2007	Yuri Chursin (actor)	Playing the Victim	Изображая жертву	Izobrazhaya zhertvu	
**2008**	**Sergei Puskepalis (actor)**	**Simple Things**	**Простые вещи**	**Prosty'e veshchi**	
2008	Zoya Kaydanovskaya (actress)	Nothing Personal	Ничего личного	Nichego lichnogo	
2008	Aleksandr Mindadze (film director)	Soaring	Отрыв	Otryv	
**2009**	**Valeriya Gai Germanika (film director)**	**Everybody Dies but Me**	**Все умрут, а я останусь**	**Vse umrut, a ya ostanus**	
2009	Bakur Bakuradze (film director)	Shultes	Шультес	Shultes	
2009	Konstantin Meladze (Music Producer)	Hipsters	Стиляги	Stilyagi	

=== 2010s ===
Year	Recipient	International title	Original title	Transliterated title (per BGN/PCGN standard)	Ref(s)
**2010**	**Pavel Bardin (film director)**	**Russia 88**	**Россия 88**	**Rossiya 88**	
2010	Egor Pavlov (actor)	Pete on the Way to Heaven	Петя по дороге в Царствие Небесное	Petia po doroge v tsarstvie nebesnoye	
2010	Vasily Sigarev (film director)	Wolfy	Волчок	Volchok	
**2011**	**Dmitry Mamuliya (film director)**	**Another Sky**	**Другое небо**	**Drugoe nebo**	
2011	Andrey Karasyov (composer)	Silent Souls	Овсянки	Ovsyanki	
2011	Aleksey Kopashov (actor)	Fortress of War	Брестская крепость	Brestskaia krepost	
**2012**	**Dmitry Astrakhan (supporting actor)**	**Vysotsky. Thank You For Being Alive**	**Высоцкий. Спасибо, что живой**	**Vysotskiy. Spasibo, chto zhivoy**	
**2012**	**Mikhail Protsko (actor)**	**Siberia, Monamour**	**Сибирь. Монамур**	**Sibir. Monamur**	
2012	Konstantin Buslov (film director)	Cash	Бабло	Bablo	
2012	Angelina Nikonova (film director)	Twilight Portrait	Портрет в сумерках	Portret v sumerkakh	
**2013**	**Alexey Andrianov (film director)**	**Spy**	**Шпион**	**Shpion**	
2013	Fedot Lvov (supporting actor)	The Horde	Орда	Orda	
2013	Vladimir Svirskiy (actor)	In the Fog	В тумане	V tumane	
**2014**	**Zhora Kryzhovnikov (film director)**	**Kiss Them All!**	**Горько!**	**Gorko!**	
2014	Natalya Merkulova & Aleksey Chupov (film directors)	Intimate Parts	Интимные места	Intimnye mesta	
2014	Anfisa Chernykh (supporting actress)	The Geographer Drank His Globe Away	Географ глобус пропил	Geograf Globus Propil	
**2015**	**Ivan I. Tverdovsky (film director)**	**Corrections Class**	**Класс коррекции**	**Klass korrektsii**	
2015	Nataliya Meshchaninova & Lyubov Mulmenko (screenwriters)	The Hope Factory	Комбинат "Надежда"	Kombinat "Nadezhda"	
2015	Severija Janušauskaitė (actress)	Star	Звезда	Zvezda	
**2016**	**Ivan Kolesnikov (actor)**	**The End of Beautiful Era**	**Конец прекрасной эпохи**	**Konets prekrasnoy epokhi**	
2016	Natalia Kudryashova (film director)	Pioneer Heroes	Пионеры-герои	Pionery-geroi	
2016	Ella Manzheeva (film director)	The Gulls	Чайки	Chayki	
**2017**	**Alexey Krasovsky (film director)**	**The Collector**	**Коллектор**	**Kollektor**	
2017	Eduard Bordukov (film director)	Pitch	Коробка	Korobka	
2017	Peter Skvortsov (actor)	The Student	Ученик	Uchenik	
**2018**	**Aleksandr Khant (film director)**	**How Vitka Chesnok Drove Lyokha Shtyr to the House for Disabled**	**Как Витька Чеснок вёз Лёху Штыря в дом инвалидов**	**Kak Vitka Chesnok vyoz Lyokhu Shtyrya v dom invalidov**	
2018	Kantemir Balagov (film director)	Closeness	Теснота	Tesnota	
2018	Kirill Pletnyov (film director)	Light Up!	Жги!	Zhgi!	
**2019**	**Roman Bilyk (actor)**	**Leto**	**Лето**	**Leto**	
2019	Alexander Gorchilin (film director)	Acid	Кислота	Kislota	
2019	Marta Kozlova (actress)	Anna's War	Война Анны	Voyna Anny	

=== 2020s ===
Year	Recipient	International title	Original title	Transliterated title (per BGN/PCGN standard)	Ref(s)
**2020**	**Alexander Zolotukhin (film director)**	**A Russian Youth**	**Мальчик русский**	**Malchik russkiy**	
2020	Boris Akopov (film director)	The Bull	Бык	Byk	
2020	Evgenia Obraztsova (actress)	A Frenchman	Француз	Frantsuz	
**2021**	**Philipp Yuryev (film director)**	**The Whaler Boy**	**Китобой**	**Kitoboy**	
2021	Michael Lockshin (film director)	The Silver Skates	Серебряные коньки	Serebryanye konki	
2021	Semyon Serzin (film director)	Man from Podolsk	Человек из Подольска	Chelovek iz Podolska	
2022	Milana Aguzarova (actress)	Unclenching the Fists	Разжимая кулаки	Razzhimaya kulaki	
2022	Roman Vasyanov (film director)	Hostel	Общага	Obschaga	
2022	Yevgeny Grigorev (film director)	The Riot	Подельники	Podelniki	
2022	Mariya Izyumova (screenwriter)	Mama, I'm Home	Мама, я дома	Mama, ya doma	
2022	Lyubov Mulmenko (film director)	The Danube	Дунай	Dunay	
**2024**	**Makar Khlebnikov (actor)**	**Three Minutes of Silence**	**Снегирь**	**Snegir**	
2024	Sergey Ilyin (film director)	Matthew Passion	Страсти по Матвею	Strasti po Matveyu	
2024	Maria Zolotukhina (actress)	The Righteous	Праведник,	Pravednik	
2024	Natalia Gugueva (film director)	Fog	Туман	Tuman	
**2025**	**Zaka Abdrakhmanova (film director)**	**Papa died at Saturday**	**Папа умер в субботу**	**Papa umer v subbotu**	
2025	Anna Kuznetsova (film director)	Holidays	Каникулы	Kanikuli	
2025	Nikolay Larionov (film director)	Endless Winter	Вечная зима	Vechnaya zima	
