= Butterfly Jam =

2026 drama film by Kantemir Balagov

- Directed by: Kantemir Balagov
- Screenplay by: Kantemir Balagov; Marina Stepnova
- Produced by: Pascal Caucheteux; Alexander Rodnyansky; Pauline Lamy; Gaetan Rousseau
- Starring: Talha Akdogan; Riley Keough; Barry Keoghan; Harry Melling
- Cinematography: Jomo Fray
- Edited by: Kantemir Balagov; Juliette Welfling; Mathilde Chazaud
- Music by: Evgueni Galperine; Sacha Galperine
- Production companies: AR Content; Why Not Productions; Goodfellas; Arte France Cinéma; Senator Film Produktion; Les Films du Fleuve
- Distributed by: Le Pacte (France)
- Release dates: 13 May 2026 (Cannes); 7 October 2026 (France)
- Running time: 102 minutes
- Countries: France; Germany; Belgium
- Languages: English; Cherkess

Butterfly Jam is a 2026 drama film directed by Kantemir Balagov, in his English-language debut, co-written with Marina Stepnova. A co-production of France, Germany, and Belgium, it stars Talha Akdogan, Riley Keough, Barry Keoghan and Harry Melling, and follows the Circassian diaspora in New Jersey.

The film had its world premiere as the opening film of the Directors' Fortnight section of the 2026 Cannes Film Festival on 13 May. It was theatrically released in France by Le Pacte on 7 October.

== Premise ==
16 years old Pyteh splits his time between the wrestling mat and his family’s struggling Circassian diner in Newark. A single impulsive decision by his hustling father changes the course of his life, shaping a tale of pride, legacy, and masculinity.

== Cast ==
- Talha Akdogan as Temir / Pyteh
- Barry Keoghan as Azik
- Riley Keough as Zalya
- Harry Melling as Marat
- Zaramok Bachok as Kantik
- Jaliyah Richards as Alika
- Michael Kupisk as Craig
- Tommy McInnis as Paramedic
- Monica Bellucci

== Production ==
=== Development ===
The film was first reported as in development in 2022, shortly after Kantemir Balagov left Russia for exile in California following 2022 Russian invasion of Ukraine, which Balagov and his girlfriend Kira Kovalenko publicly criticized on their social media. The screenplay was written by Balagov and Marina Stepnova, marking his English-language directing debut.

It was produced by Pascal Caucheteux for Why Not Productions and Alexander Rodnyansky for AR Content. Co-produced by Goodfellas, Arte France Cinéma, Senator Film Produktion, and Les Films du Fleuve. In association with Library Pictures International, Leaf Entertainment, Wolfcub Productions, and Felix Culpa. With the support of Eurimages and Pictanovo (Hauts-de-France region).

=== Filming ===
Principal photography began on 2 April 2025. Shooting on location take place in Northern France, including scenes filmed on the beach at Zuydcoote, in Dunkirk, as well as in Saint-Pol-sur-Mer. Harry Melling joined the cast in early April 2025, followed by Tommy McInnis and Monica Bellucci.

American cinematographer Jomo Fray was the director of photography, marking his first collaboration with Balagov. Angelo Zamparutti was the production designer, while Judy Shrewsbury was the costume designer. Russian musicians Evgueni Galperine and Sacha Galperine composed the score.

=== Post-production ===
The film entered post-production by June 2025. Nearly six months after the world premiere at the 2026 Cannes Film Festival, where the film received mixed reviews, Balagov stated in a interview with Le Monde his disapproval of the film's final cut, for having conceded to his producers' demands.

== Release ==
The film had its world premiere at the Directors' Fortnight section of the 2026 Cannes Film Festival on 13 May. It was theatrically released in France by Le Pacte on 7 October.

Goodfellas will handle international rights.

== Reception ==
On review aggregator website Rotten Tomatoes, the film holds an approval rating of 48% based on 25 reviews, with an average rating of 4.8/10. On Metacritic, which uses a weighted average, the film holds a score of 58/100 based on 11 critics, indicating "mixed or average" reviews.
