= Mizur =

Mizur Мизур
- Settlement

Other transcription(s)
  - Ossetic: Мызур
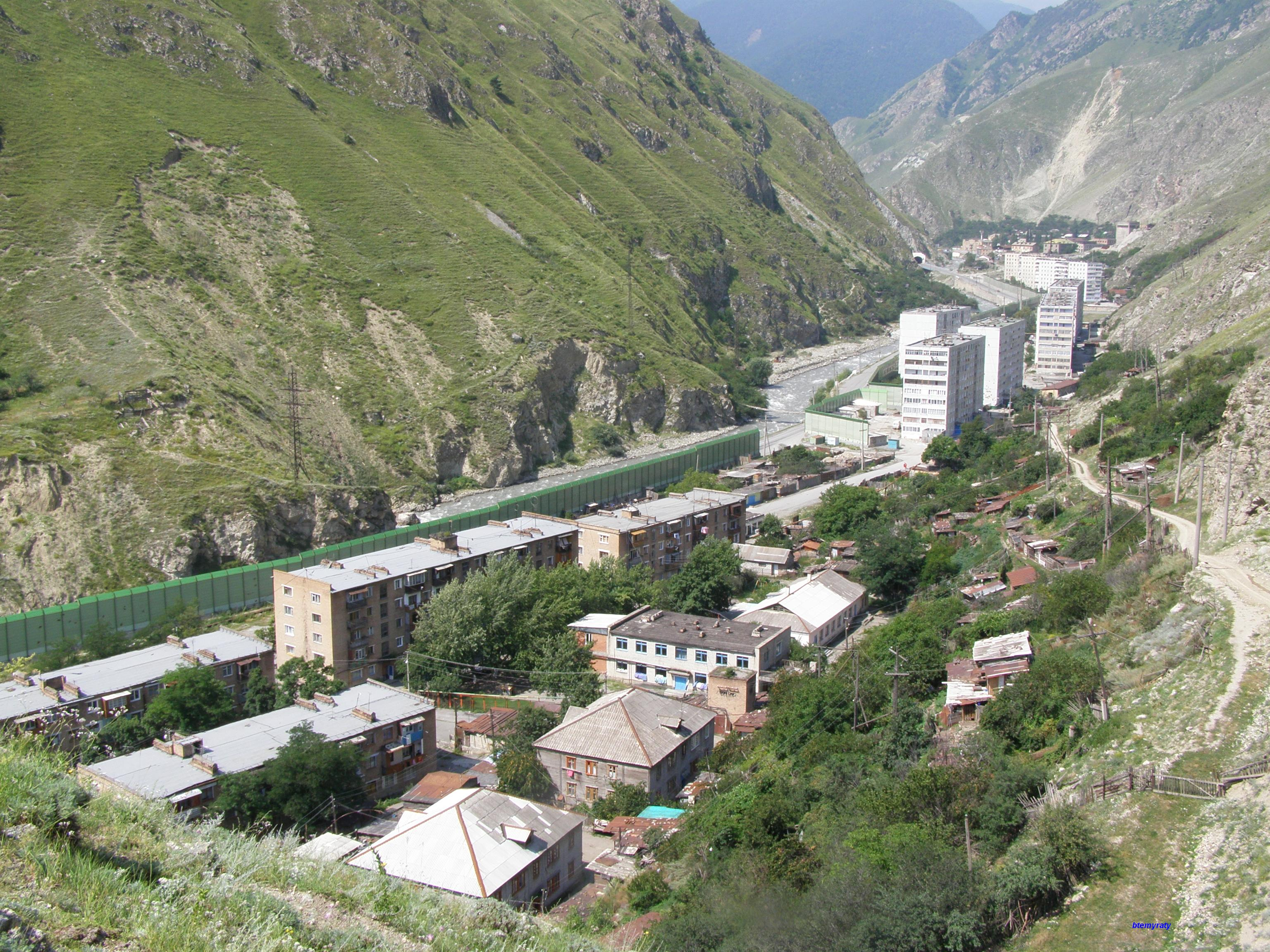
- Interactive map of Mizur
- Location of Mizur Mizur (North Ossetia–Alania)
- Coordinates: 42°51′N 44°03′E
- Country: Russia
- Federal subject: North Ossetia–Alania
- Administrative district: Alagirsky District
- Founded: 1829

Population (2010 Census)
  - Total: 3,166
  - Estimate (2021): 2,142 (−32.3%)
- Time zone: UTC+3 (MSK)
- Postal code: 363220
- OKTMO ID: 90605426101

Mizur (Russian: Мизур; Iron Ossetic: Мызур, Myzur) is a rural locality (a settlement) in Alagirsky District of the Republic of North Ossetia–Alania, Russia, located on the Ardon River. Population: 3,166 (2010 census); 2,883 (2002 census); 4,005 (1989 Soviet census).

== Economy ==
Mining is the main occupation of the settlement's residents.

== In film ==
The 2021 Ossetian-language film Unclenching the Fists by Kira Kovalenko is set in Mizur.
