= Alisa ne mozhet zhdat =

Alisa ne mozhet zhdat (English: Alisa Can't Wait) is a Russian drama television series created by director Natalia Meshchaninova. It premiered on October 20, 2022.

== Plot ==
Alisa, a 15-year-old girl, discovers that her mother has been hiding the truth for many years: in a couple of years, the girl will go blind. Deciding not to waste time, she drops out of school and, in search of easy money, makes a contract to sell her virginity in order to use the earnings to move to a big city. Alisa's sister, Julia, is also struggling: her husband is jealous and alcoholic, and their relationship is on the verge of collapse. Their mother tries to keep everything under control but cannot cope.

== Cast ==
- Yelizaveta Ishchenko as Alisa
- Anna Mikhalkova as Irina, the mother of Alisa and Julia
- Taisia Vilkova as Julia, Alisa's older sister
- Stepan Devonin as Artyom, Julia's husband
- Mikhail Trukhin as Igor, the father of Alisa and Julia
- Nadezhda Lumpova as Maya, Alisa's friend, a teacher
- Dmitry Lysenko as Ivan, a ukulele teacher
- Pavel Vorozhtsov as the agent
- Polina Tsyganova as Vika
- Nil Bugayev as Motya, Julia and Artyom's son
- Aleksei Lukin as Fil
- Svetlana Kamynina as the ophthalmologist
- Maksim Stoyanov as Seryozha
- Anna Shepeleva as Alena

== Production ==
The series is based on the true story of a girl who loses her sight. Filming took place in Moscow and Tver.

== Reception ==
At the Novy Sezon 2022 online film festival, it won in the category of most anticipated TV series, and lead actress Yelizaveta Ishchenko was named the "hero of the new season".

On February 23, 2024, the series was removed from Russian streaming services at the request of the Federal Service for Supervision of Communications, Information Technology, and Mass Media. A specific reason was not provided. A streaming service representative only stated that certain violations had been found in some episodes of the series and "the series contains information that should not be distributed in an audiovisual service."
