= Alexander Zolotukhin =

Russian film director

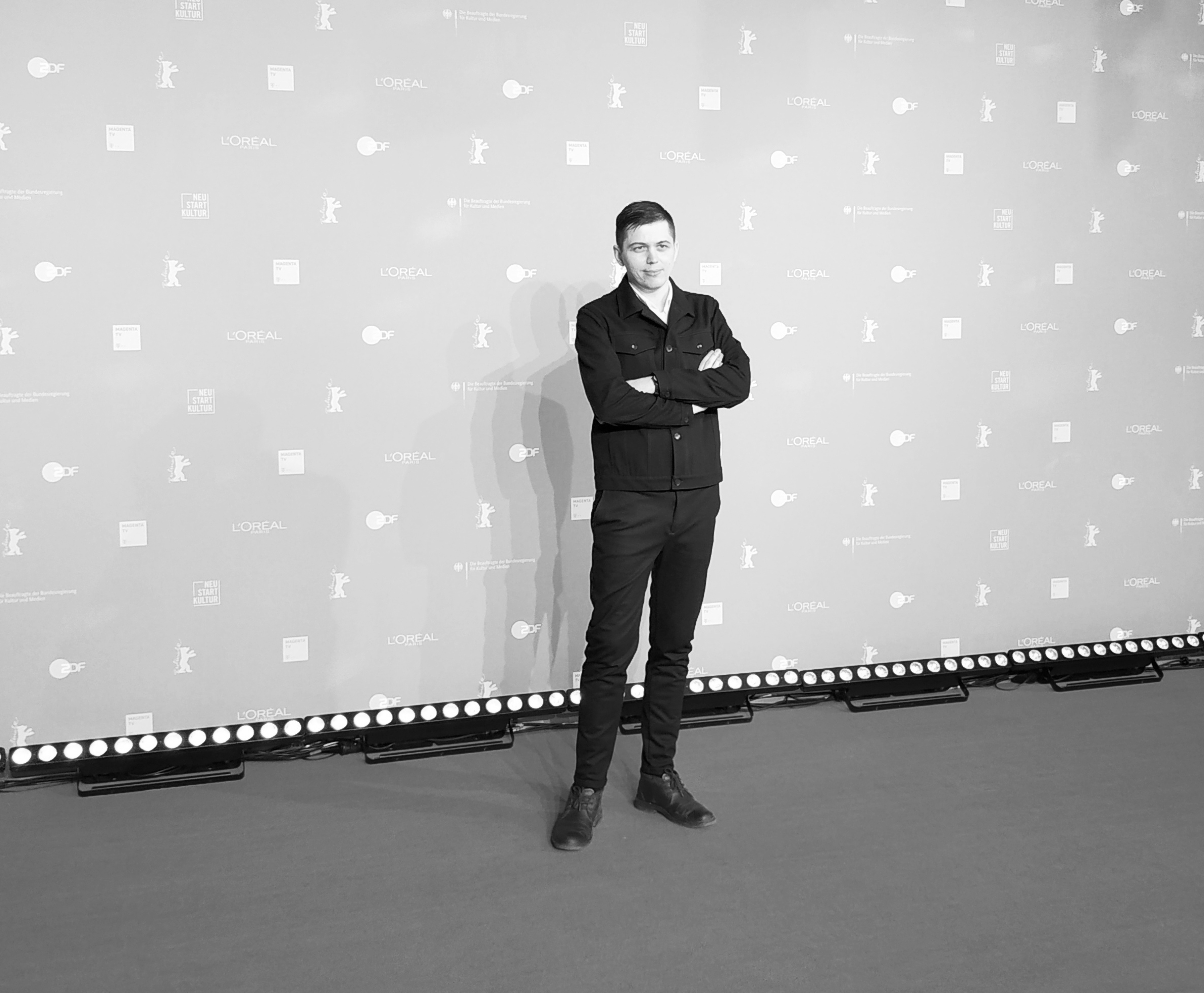
- Alexander Zolotukhin at his 'Brother in Every Inch' photocall at Berlin Film Festival, February 13, 2022
- Born: Александр Николаевич Золотухин; 1988 (age 37–38); Zaporizhzhia, Ukrainian SSR, Soviet Union
- Occupations: Director; screenwriter
- Years active: 2014–present
- Notable work: A Russian Youth, Brother in Every Inch (2022)

Alexander Nikolayevich Zolotukhin (Russian: Александр Николаевич Золотухин) is a Russian film director and scenarist, student of Alexander Sokurov.

== Biography ==
Alexander was born to a military pilot serving in Ukraine. The family moved frequently and lived in Kazakhstan, Belarus, and Caucasus.

Zolotukhin graduated from art school in 2005 and enrolled in the Economics Department of the Kabardino-Balkarian State University (KBSU). He graduated as a programmer and worked in the specialty to pay for studies at the Saint Petersburg State Institute of Film and Television Screen Arts department. In 2012 he transferred to Alexander Sokurov's course at KBSU and graduated in 2015 together with Kira Kovalenko, Kantemir Balagov and Vladimir Bitokov. He played a small part in Balagov's debut film Closeness.

== Career ==
Zolotukhin's early works include New Prometheus (2011), Songs That People Sang Before I Was Born (2012), Ornament (2014), Opyty (2016), Life Story of My Friend (2017), To Stumble (2019).

In 2019 Zolotukhin released his debut A Russian Youth. The film tells a story of a Russian peasant boy who volunteers as a soldier in 1916 and loses his sight at the very first combat. The main part was played by an orphan Vladimir Korolev, Alexander Sokurov became the movie's art consultant. The film was premiered in 2019 at the Berlin International Film Festival. The movie was awarded at numerous festivals and competitions, it got Nika 2021 "Discovery of the Year" Award, ‘Best Director Debut’ at the International Film Festival "Baltic Debuts", Gran-Prix of the ‘Forward Future’ program at Beijing International Film Festival, two main prizes of Fajr International Film Festival, Gran-Prix of the XVII International Film Festival "Pacific Meridian", Circle Award 2019, and Special Prize at the XVI Sevilla International Film Festival.

Zolotukhin's second movie Brother in Every Inch (rus. «Брат во всём») premiered at the 72 Berlin Film Festival in the Encounters section. The movie tells a story of two brothers who share a dream of becoming pilots and enter an air force school. Despite the militarism of the setting, the film turned out to be a subtle anti-war manifesto. As explained by Zolotukhin, his heroes dream about flights and free sky, not about bombings. In interviews, the director directly calls ‘any war a disgusting, indecent and horrible thing’. The main parts were played by twin brothers Nikolay and Sergey Zhuravlev who are actually actors of the puppet theater. By a sad coincidence, the Russian premiere took place on February 24, 2022.
