= Hilton Kyiv =

Hotel in Kyiv, Ukraine

Coordinates: 50.445383°N 30.504850°E

- Map of Ukraine with Kiev highlighted
- Hotel chain: Hilton Hotels & Resorts

General information
- Type: Luxury Hotel
- Location: 30 Tarasa Shevchenka Boulevard, Kyiv, Ukraine
- Opened: 2014
- Owner: Hilton Inc.

Other information
- Number of rooms: 262

Website
- Official website

The Hilton Kyiv is a 5-star hotel located in Kyiv, Ukraine. The hotel is a branch of the Hilton Hotels chain. It is a part of the residential complex H-Tower, which is located in the city center at Taras Shevchenko Boulevard. The complex was designed by the renowned British architect John Seifert, who also designed other 10 Hilton hotels in London, Paris, Antwerpen and Dubrovnik.

== Overview ==
This multifunctional complex consists of a 25-floor central tower and two wings with 16 floors each. Hilton Kyiv occupies 3-8 floors out of 26. The H-Tower earned worldwide acclaim, garnering a prestigious European real estate award in 2011.

The global economic crisis hit in 2008 and idled construction sites across Kyiv as financing dried up. However Ex-president of "CTC Media" Alexander Rodnyansky and his cousin Boris Fuksman try themselves in development: they invested up to $ 100 million in the completion of the five-star Hilton hotel in the center of Kyiv, which was to host 2012 European Football Championship. The leadership of the Union of European Football Associations (UEFA) has repeatedly warned that because of the low pace of construction of sports facilities Ukraine may lose the right to hold Euro-2012.

Hilton Kyiv opened in 2014. It offers 262 guest rooms, a contemporary restaurant, a business center, meeting rooms and a spa. In order to control all the systems and items around the hotel, Hilton Kyiv uses SmartHome automation system.
