= The Whaler Boy =

2020 film

- Russian theatrical release poster
- Directed by: Philippe Youriev
- Screenplay by: Philippe Youriev
- Cinematography: Mikhail Khoursevitch; Yakov Mironitchev
- Edited by: Alexandr Krylov; Karolina Maciejewska
- Music by: Krzysztof A. Janczak
- Distributed by: Columbia Pictures (through Sony Pictures Releasing International; Russia)
- Release date: 8 October 2020 (Russia)
- Countries: Russia; Belgium; Poland
- Language: Russian

The Whaler Boy (Russian: Китобой, lit. 'Kitoboï') is a 2020 coming-of-age drama film written and directed by Philippe Youriev, at his feature film debut.

A co-production between Russia, Poland and Belgium, the film premiered at the 77th edition of the Venice Film Festival, in which it won the GdA Director's Award.

== Cast ==
- Vladimir Onokhov as Lyochka
- Kristina Asmous as the American
- Vladimir Lyubimtsev as Kolian
- Nikolay Tatato as the grandfather
- Arieh Worthalter as the border guard
- Maria Chuprinskaia as the blonde

== Production ==
The film was produced by Rock Films, Orka and Man's Films Productions. It was shot over a period of seven years in the Chukotka region.

== Release ==
The film premiered at the 77th Venice International Film Festival, in the Giornate degli Autori sidebar, in which it won the section's main award, the Director's Award.

== Reception ==
On the review aggregator website Rotten Tomatoes, 93% of 15 critics' reviews are positive. On Metacritic, the film has a weighted average score of 70 out of 100, based on 5 critics, indicating "generally favorable reviews".

Variety film critic Jessica Kiang described it as "an ambitious, sometimes self-consciously ironic blend of genres and influences, which perhaps convince most when they do not cohere." William Repass from Slant Magazine called it "a vivid rumination on the fuzzy border between fantasy and reality", where "coming of age is inseparable from disillusionment."

For this film Youriev won the Nika Award as Discovery of the Year. The film also won the Transilvania Trophy for best film at the Transilvania International Film Festival.
