= Brother in Every Inch =

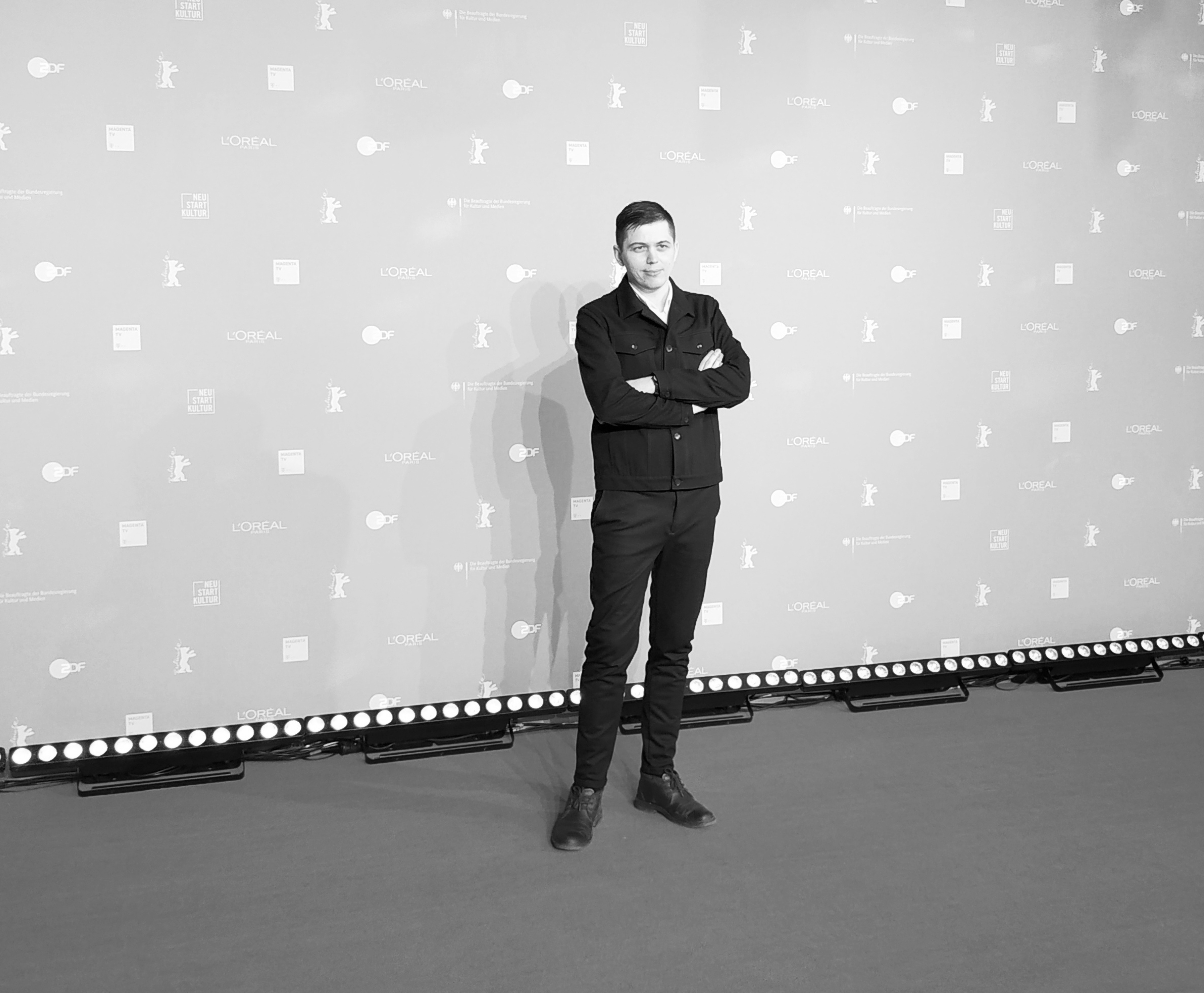
- Alexander Zolotukhin, the director of the film Brother in Every Inch, at the Berlinale on 13 February 2022
- Directed by: Alexander Zolotukhin
- Written by: Alexander Zolotukhin
- Produced by: Andrey Sigle; Mary Nazari
- Starring: Nikolay Zhuravlyov; Sergey Zhuravlyov; Aleksandra Shevyryova; Mikhail Klabukov; Egor Kutushov; Oleg Metelev
- Cinematography: Andrey Naydenov
- Edited by: Tatyana Kuzmicheva
- Production companies: Proline Film; Ministry of Culture of the Russian Federation; Ministry of Defence of the Russian Federation
- Distributed by: Pioner Cinema
- Release dates: February 13, 2022 (Berlin); March 3, 2022 (Russia)
- Running time: 80 minutes
- Country: Russia
- Language: Russian

Brother in Every Inch (Russian: Брат во всём, romanized: Brat vo vsyom) is a Russian aviation coming-of-age drama film written and directed by Alexander Zolotukhin, starring Nikolay Zhuravlyov and Sergey Zhuravlyov as twin brothers who dream of becoming military pilots but are prevented from doing so by their attachment to each other. They have to make a difficult choice for the sake of their dreams.

The film was included in the Encounters program of the 72nd Berlin International Film Festival, and released in wide distribution in Russia on March 3, 2022.

== Plot ==
The story of the painful separation and the growing up of two twin brothers Mitya and Andrey Berezin, who study the difficult and dangerous profession of Russian military pilots. Since childhood, they have been inseparable. They rejoice and grieve together, overcome difficulties and adversities. But now the brothers understand that with their great love, care and affection they prevent each other from achieving a common dream – to conquer the sky. As a result, each of them is faced with a difficult choice, on which their fates depend.

== Production ==
Being a son of an air force pilot, Zolotukhin managed to get access to Russian military bases and screen real cadets and their trainings process.

== Cast ==
- Nikolay Zhuravlyov as Dmitry 'Mitya' Berezin
  (English: Nikolay Zhuravlev)
- Sergey Zhuravlyov as Andrey Berezin
  (English: Sergey Zhuravlev)
- Aleksandra Shevyryova as Lera
  (English: Alexandra Shevyreva)
- Mikhail Klabukov as a dad
- Egor Kutushov
- Oleg Metelev as a neurophysiologist
- Daniil Kharin as Mosya
- Aleksandr Kanakin as a flight school cadet
- Aleksandr Khalyuta as an instructor
- Artur Kaspranov as Pasha
- Maksim Sapich as Major Pakhomov
- Vyacheslav Savelyev as Sergeant Bogomolov
