= Circassian Americans =

American citizens and nationals who are ethnic Circassians

Circassian-Americans (English) Адыгэ Американхэр (Adyghe)

Total population
- 8,000-15,000

Regions with significant populations
- Mainly: New Jersey (Passaic, Bergen) Smaller populations: California, New York, Florida, other states

Languages
- Circassian (West, East); English; Arabic; Turkish; Russian

Religion
- Sunni Islam (Hanafi) Christianity (small minority)

Related ethnic groups
- Other North Caucasian peoples

Circassian Americans (Adyghe: Адыгэ Американхэр; Kabardian: Адыгэ Американхэр) are Circassians living in the United States. They are mostly found in New York, California, and New Jersey, and their numbers are estimated to be between 8,000 and 15,000. The largest established community of Circassian Americans resides in the state of New Jersey, particularly in Passaic and Bergen counties. The Circassian Benevolent Association, the umbrella organization of US Circassians, is located in New Jersey. There is also a Circassian community in Canada.

== Culture ==
Circassians from the United States of America (Adyghe: Америкэ Штат Зэготхэм ис Адыгэхэр) maintain a dual identity, expressing American culture while preserving distinct elements of their ethnic heritage. The core of Circassian identity in the US remains the Adyghe Xabze. The community is multilingual, speaking Circassian, English, and Arabic. Circassian cuisine is a major cultural element preserved across generations. Popular dishes include Haliva and Ships Pasta. Folklore and dance are considered the primary features distinguishing Circassians from other ethnic groups. Traditional dances such as the Qafa, Wij, and Islamey are performed at weddings and cultural events. The community maintains the Narts Dance Ensemble (named after the Nart saga). Traditional instruments like the Pshina (accordion) are preserved. The community is socioeconomically diverse, with members working in medicine, education, civil service, law enforcement, and the military, as well as owning businesses in construction and catering. In 2010, the Governor of New Jersey honored the community for being "free of crime, drugs, and alcohol". The community observes several holidays: Adiga Day, celebrated in September; Circassian Memorial Day, observed on May 21st to commemorate the Circassian Genocide; Eid al-Fitr and Eid al-Adha ("Kurman Day"; Adyghe: Къурмэн маф); Ashura, Thanksgiving and the 4th of July.

The community is currently experiencing a significant language shift away from their ethnic Adyghe language and toward English. English is the dominant language used in almost all public and social domains, utilized universally in the workplace and overwhelmingly with neighbors, non-Circassian friends, and even among Circassian peers. The Adyghe language remains preserved primarily within the home, specifically in intergenerational communication. Circassian is predominantly spoken by the elder members of the community and is the primary language used when younger generations address their grandparents, representing over 52% of these interactions. A study found that a large majority of the New Jersey Circassian community (81.5%) agrees that learning the Circassian language is essential for maintaining their ethnic identity. However, some Circassian Americans have abandoned Adyghe fluency as redundant, focusing instead on Adyghe Khabze, traditional dances and folklore. The Circassian Benevolent Association (CBA) hosts a Sunday school where volunteers teach the Circassian language.

In recent years, growing political pressure and the criminalization of civil society initiatives in Russia have forced many scholars and language activists to relocate, shifting the epicenter of Circassian language activism and cultural preservation to countries abroad, including the United States.

== History ==
The term "Circassian Americans" includes ethnic Circassian immigrants to the United States and their American-born descendants. All Circassians in the United States trace their common origin to Circassia. However, there have been different waves of immigration originating from different regions. There are Circassians in the United States who came from Turkey, Jordan, Syria and Russia.

The largest community of Circassians in America are the Circassians of New Jersey (Adyghe: Ню-Джерсим щыщ Адыгэхэр), followed by the Circassians of California (Adyghe: Калифорнием щыщ Адыгэхэр).

=== Arrival of Ottoman Circassians to the US ===
Before the Russo-Circassian War ended in 1864, a mass deportation was launched against the population surviving the Circassian genocide. Including calculations taking into account the Russian government's own archival figures, it is estimated that 95–97% of the Circassian nation was destroyed during this process. The displaced people generally settled in the Ottoman Empire. Between 1820 and 1920, significant waves of Ottoman migration to the United States began. Approximately 300,000 people immigrated to the United States from the Ottoman Empire. These immigrants feared they would not be accepted in a Christian country and would face discrimination. As a result, they concealed their Islamic faith (taqiyya) to avoid discrimination. Many Ottoman Muslims felt compelled to declare themselves as "Armenian" to avoid discrimination. At the beginning of the 20th century, individual Circassian immigrants from the Ottoman Empire began to appear in the USA.

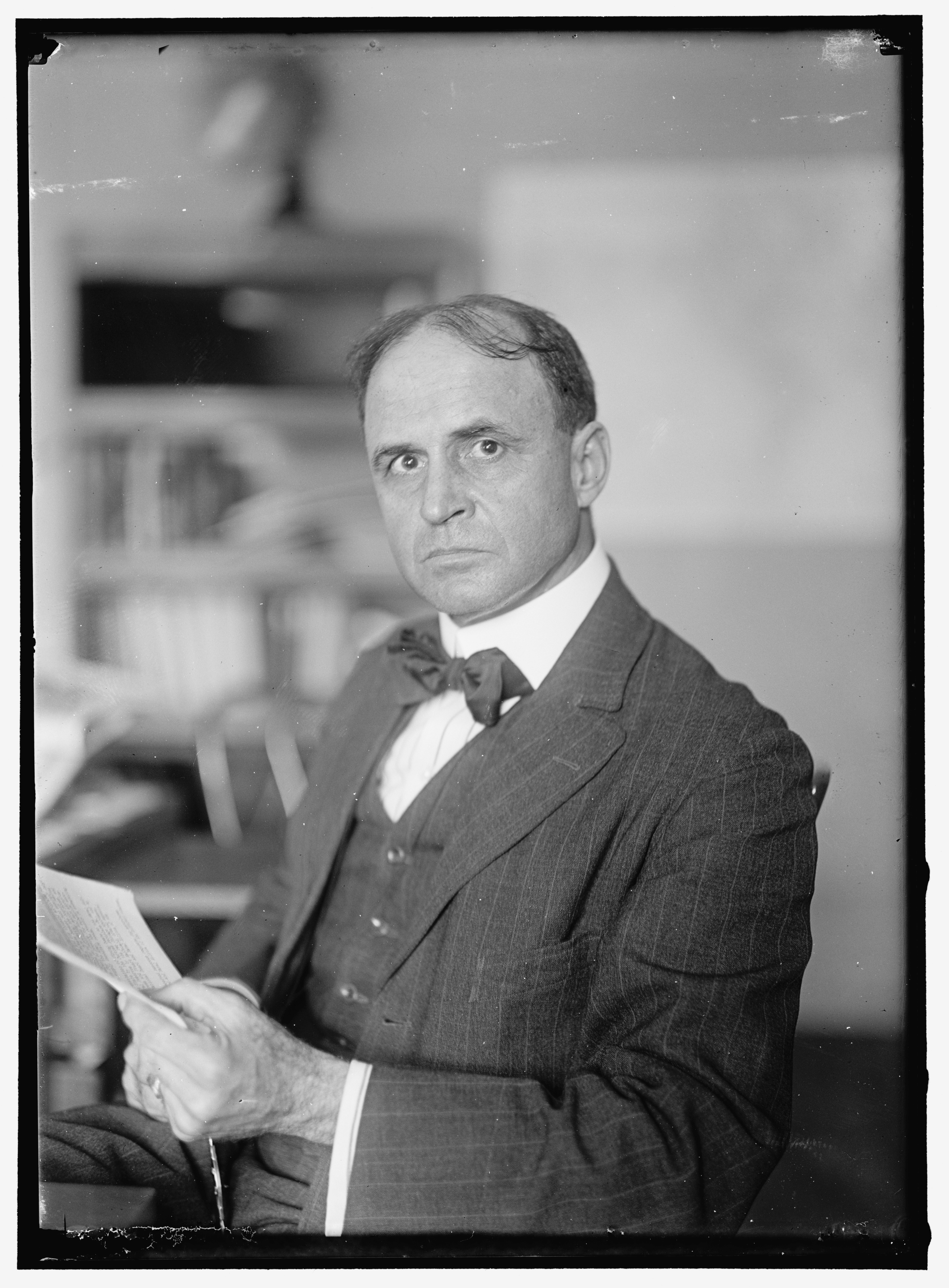
Admiral Bristol

=== "Old Immigrants" ===
The first "wave," consisted of Circassian White émigrés. The Circassians known as "old immigrants" left their homeland in the Caucasus shortly after the Russian Revolution. Many were clergy or aristocrats fleeing Communism. They set off from Novorossiysk by boat. They arrived in Istanbul in 1919 and lived there for about two and a half years. The conditions they lived in at that time were quite difficult due to the occupation of Turkey by Allied Forces after World War I. A Circassian woman known there as Fatima Hanum helped them. Fatima Hanum found a way to contact high-level Turkish officials and persuaded them to provide shelter for the refugees who had no place to live. As a result, the Ottoman Sultan allocated one of his unfurnished summer houses, which would soon be called the "Circassian House," to the Circassian refugees. Visiting this house, Admiral Bristol was saddened by the state of the Circassians; he contacted the US government and requested that the Circassians be admitted to America. Fatima Hanum hurriedly organized a private meeting and announced that the State Department had approved the admission of all Circassian refugees to the United States. However, after a long discussion, the majority rejected this offer and decided to stay in Muslim Turkey. Only a few Circassian families accepted and decided to immigrate to the United States. They arrived in America on August 1, 1923. In the 1930s, individual Circassian families and persons from Turkey, Syria, and Transjordan also resettled in the USA.

=== Arrivals resulting from World War II ===
The Drau river

The second "wave" of Circassian and other North Caucasian immigrations to the USA falls on the period of World War II, 1939–1945. So-called "displaced persons," scattered across the countries of Europe and the Middle East, began to resettle in the USA: When the Soviet army broke the German front in the Caucasus on January 17, 1943, most of the male population aged sixteen and over in this region fled to Europe for fear of being accused of collaborating with the Germans. As World War II neared its end, these refugees crossed the Italian Alps into Austria in May 1945 and settled in the Drau (Drava) River valley. Stalin demanded the return of these refugees from the Allied Powers. Circassians explained their situation by writing and sending appeal letters to leaders such as US President Roosevelt and UK Prime Minister Churchill, insisting that they not be returned to the Soviet Union. However, their requests were disregarded, and British soldiers came to collect them and extradite them to the Soviet Union. Most were captured; some managed to escape, while others committed suicide by jumping into the river. Those who managed to escape went to refugee camps and disguised themselves as refugees fleeing Nazi oppression; some came to America this way. The first of these were the Circassian couple Salamat and Teuchejh Bayramoglu, who immigrated to the United States from Germany in 1950. Blanaghaptsa was their real surname, and "Bairamoğlu" was a pseudonym they used in Europe during the post-war years.

=== Establishments ===
The Circassian Benevolent Association was founded by Circassian Americans on June 19, 1952, to "study and improve all matters concerning the welfare of Circassians in America and to strengthen the bonds of cooperation among Circassians wherever they may be in order to preserve the Circassian heritage." It houses a community center, a mosque, a Sunday school for language and history, and a banquet hall.

The Circassian Cultural Institute was founded in Totowa, New Jersey, in 2005. In California, the Kavkaz Cultural Center and the Circassian Association in California (est. 2006) serve the local community. Circassian Education Foundation (CEF) was established in 2005 and promotes higher education by providing scholarships to Circassian youth. Circassian Cultural Institute is focused on connecting Circassians globally and promoting awareness of the Circassian genocide. The Nassip Foundation was founded in 2010 to protect and promote Circassian language and history.

=== Arrival of Middle Eastern Circassians to the US ===
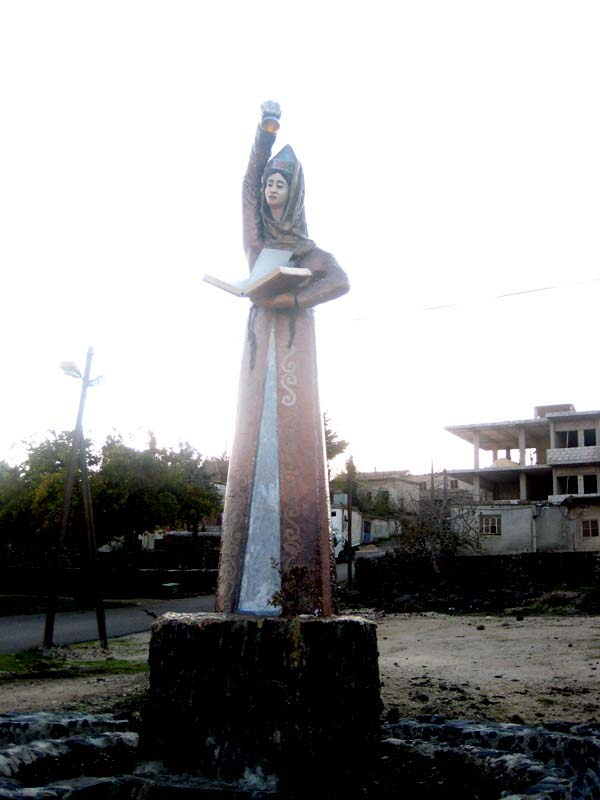
Statue of Setanay in the Circassian village of Beer Ajam, which was destroyed due to the war in Syria

The first Circassian to come to the US from the Middle Eastern Circassian diaspora was Omar Kashoga and his family from Jordan, who arrived in 1917. In 1951, Mustafa Kazuk and his family, a Circassian from Turkey, arrived. Later, migrations began from other countries such as Syria and Saudi Arabia.

The third "wave" of Circassian immigration to the USA falls in the summer of 1967. Hundreds of Circassian refugees from the Syrian Golan Heights occupied by Israel began to arrive in Paterson. Jordanian and Syrian Circassian communities in the US grew further after the Six-Day War in 1967. Circassians also migrated from the Middle East following the Syrian civil war. Due to the lack of employment prospects in the late 20th and early 21st centuries, the process of labor emigration intensified within the Circassian diaspora of Syria: young specialists began to leave in search of work in the USA, Canada, Western European countries, and the United Arab Emirates. In subsequent years, the process of Circassian emigration from Arab countries and Turkey to the USA continued. In the 1990s and early 21st century, an insignificant number of Circassians from the North Caucasus resettled in the USA, predominantly young specialists seeking to find promising work. The American Circassian community mobilized to send aid to Turkey following the 2023 Turkey–Syria earthquakes.

== In popular culture ==
Kantemir Balagov's 2026 film Butterfly Jam, which debuted at the 2026 Cannes Film Festival, follows the Circassian diaspora in New Jersey.

== Notable people ==
- Mehmet Öz – television personality, cardiothoracic surgeon, Columbia University professor, and author
- Caner Dagli – Islamic scholar and associate professor of Religious Studies at the College of the Holy Cross in Worcester, Massachusetts
- Daphne Öz – New York Times Bestselling nutrition author, chef, and Emmy Award Winning television host
- Nadine Jolie Courtney – lifestyle writer, novelist, and former media personality
- Emanne Beasha – singer. She is the winner of the fifth season of the program Arabs Got Talent and finished in 9th place on fourteenth Season of America's Got Talent
- Derya Arbaş – actress
- Costa Chekrezi – historian and publicist of mixed Circassian and Albanian ethnicity
- Tscherim Soobzokov - Nazi collaborator and American politician, assassinated in 1985
- Nart Hapatsha - first Muslim undersheriff of Passaic county
