= Wet Dog =

2021 German drama film

- Theatrical release poster
- Directed by: Damir Lukačević
- Written by: Damir Lukačević
- Based on: Ein nasser Hund ist besser als ein trockener Jude by Arye Sharuz Shalicar
- Produced by: Alexander van Dülmen; Stephan Wagner
- Starring: Doguhan Kabadayi; Mohammad Eliraqui; Derya Dilber; Kida Khodr Ramadan
- Cinematography: Sten Mende
- Edited by: Christoph Strothjohann
- Music by: Boris Bojadzhiev
- Production companies: Carte Blanche International; Warner Bros. Film Productions Germany; A Company Film & Licensing
- Distributed by: Warner Bros. Pictures
- Release date: 9 September 2021
- Running time: 103 minutes
- Country: Germany
- Language: German

Wet Dog (German: Ein nasser Hund) is a 2021 German drama film written and directed by Damir Lukačević, based on the autobiography Ein nasser Hund ist besser als ein trockener Jude by Arye Sharuz Shalicar. It tells the story of an Iranian-born Jewish teenager whose family moves to the Berlin district of Wedding.

== Cast ==
- Doğuhan Kabadayı as Soheil
- Mohammad Eliraqui as Husseyn
- Derya Dilber as Selma
- Kida Khodr Ramadan as Vater Shahriar
- Dorka Gryllus as Mutter Roya
- Christoph Letkowski as Lehrer
- Omar Antabli as Fadi
- Maradona Akkouch as Ricky
- Emircan Emes Yildirim as Emre
- Samy Abdel Fattah as Baris
- Hassan Kello as Khalil
- Hussein Eliraqui as Mehmet, der Kreuzberger
- Tua El-Fawwal as Djamila
