= Loveless (soundtrack) =

Loveless (Original Motion Picture Soundtrack)

Film score by Evgueni and Sacha Galperine
- Released: 16 February 2018
- Genre: Film score
- Length: 29:46
- Label: Varèse Sarabande
- Producer: Evgueni Galperine

Evgueni and Sacha Galperine chronology
The Wizard of Lies (2017)	Loveless (2018)	Paterno (2018)

Loveless (Original Motion Picture Soundtrack) is the film score to the 2017 film Loveless directed by Andrey Zvyagintsev. The film score is composed by Evgueni and Sacha Galperine and released under the Varèse Sarabande record label on 16 February 2018. The score was written based on the composer's interpretations of the story without reading the script or watching the film; the piece "11 Cycles of E" was composed within a single note, chord and rhythm and was well received by critics.

== Development ==
Loveless featured an original score written by Evgueni and Sacha Galperine. They had written the music based on the synopsis of the story idea provided by Zvyagintsev, who refrained them from seeing the film or reading the script. Much of the music had been written based on their own interpretations of the story and the emotional underlining. Evgueni stated that the piece "11 Cycles of E" was composed with their interpretation of a parent's narrowly focused thoughts on finding a missing child. Based on that sole idea, they wanted to compose a theme that uses a single note, a single chord and a single rhythm, which eventually became "11 Cycles of E". This track is featured in the opening and end credits.

Both Evgueni and Sacha Galperine wrote nine tracks for the film running for 30 minutes, which is present in the album. However, the film uses only four tracks running for 17 minutes. Zvyagintsev also liked certain tracks that where unused in the film, as it became part of the universe of Loveless and the soundtrack also constituted that universe as an extension of the film. Varèse Sarabande released the original score in both digital and physical formats on 16 February 2018.

== Track listing ==
No.	Title	Length
1.	"Drops and Iron Nails"	2:21
2.	"11 Cycles of E"	6:04
3.	"Trouble"	2:40
4.	"The Search"	1:48
5.	"Snowstorm"	4:02
6.	"The Cry"	1:58
7.	"Alyosha"	3:29
8.	"The Song"	3:45
9.	"The Toy Train"	3:39
Total length:		29:46

== Reception ==
Peg Aloi of The Arts Fuse noted that "the music by Evgueni and Sacha Galperine is very effective". Paulina Enck of The Hoya wrote "Film score composers Evgueni and Sacha Galperine embody the maxim of “less is more” in their score, which further enhances the sense of loss and emptiness in the film while still grounding the film in reality. The little music present in the film is soft, evocative and ethereal, both contrasting and complementing the desolate narrative and cinematography." John Bleasdale of CineVue wrote "The powerful score by Evgueni and Sacha Galperine also deserves praise in providing a solemn and at times unnerving counterpoint to the ongoing futility." Lillan Crawford and Hugh Oxlade of Varsity called it a "minimalist, yammering score that plucks and pounds alongside the lack of action". David Ehrlich of IndieWire noted it as one of the best film scores of 2017, where "Evgueni and Sacha Galperine’s score can be heard underneath much of this deeply oppressive movie". Ehrlich called the piece "11 Cycles of E" as "a striking piece of music, evoking the best of Steve Reich as it creates a thunderous storm of sound around a single dying note."

== Personnel ==
Credits adapted from liner notes:

- Composer – Evgueni and Sacha Galperine
- Cello – Livia Stanese
- Ondes Martenot – Augustin Viard
- Viola – Aurélie Deschamps
- Violin – Nicolas Alvarez
- Mixing – Aymeric Letoquart
- Mastering – Chas Ferry
- Score editor – Andrey Dergachev
- Executive producer – Alexandre Rodniansky, Andrey Zvyagintsev, Cary E. Mansfield, Evgueni Galperine
- Management – Joe Augustine
- Art direction – Bill Pitzonka

== Accolades ==
Award	Date of ceremony	Category	Recipient(s)	Result	Ref(s)
European Film Awards	9 December 2017	Best Composer	Evgueni and Sacha Galperine	Won	
Golden Eagle Awards	26 January 2018	Best Music Score	Evgueni and Sacha Galperine	Nominated	
Nika Awards	1 April 2018	Best Sound	Andrey Dergachev	Nominated	
Nika Awards	1 April 2018	Best Composer	Evgueni and Sacha Galperine	Nominated	
Russian Guild of Film Critics	21 December 2017	Best Composer	Evgueni Galperine	Nominated	
