= Nataliya Meshchaninova =

Russian film director

Nataliya Viktorovna Meshchaninova (Russian: Наталия Викторовна Мещанинова, born on 17 February 1982) is a Russian film director, screenwriter, and author. As a screenwriter, she won, in 2015 together with Lyubov Mulmenko, the Nika Award for Discovery of the Year. The films she directed were screened on major international festivals, including 2018 Toronto International Film Festival and 52nd International Film Festival Rotterdam.

Meshchaninova was born in Krasnodar. She started work on documentaries first. In 2010, she worked with Valeriya Gai Germanika as a director of the TV Series School (Shkola).

In 2024 the series Alisa can not wait, produced by Meshchaninova, was prohibited in Russia. The authorities did not provide any specific reasons.

She is married to the actor Stepan Devonin.

== Filmography ==
=== As director ===
- School (Shkola, 2010), series
- Kombinat Nadezhda (2014)
- Red Bracelets (2015), series
- Heart of the World (2018)
- Alisa can not wait (2022), series

=== As screenwriter ===
- Kombinat Nadezhda (2014)
- Heart of the World (2018)
