= Heart of the World (2018 film) =

2018 film by Nataliya Meshchaninova

- Directed by: Nataliya Meshchaninova
- Written by: Stepan Devonin; Boris Khlebnikov; Nataliya Meshchaninova
- Produced by: Tatyana Bonakova; Natalya Drozd; Len Blavatnik; Ivan Pchelenkov; Sergey Selyanov; Dagnė Vildžiūnaitė
- Starring: Stepan Devonin; Dmitriy Podnozov; Yana Sekste
- Cinematography: Yevgeny Tsvetkov
- Edited by: Dasha Danilova
- Production companies: Just A Moment; STV
- Distributed by: Nashe Kino
- Release date: 9 June 2018 (Kinotavr Film Festival)
- Running time: 124 minutes
- Countries: Russia; Lithuania
- Language: Russian

Heart of the World (Russian: Сердце мира, romanized: Serdtse mira) is a 2018 Russian-Lithuanianian drama film directed and written by Nataliya Meshchaninova. The film won the Grand Prix at the Kinotavr 2018.

== Plot ==
The film tells about the veterinarian Yegor, who works at a training station for hunting dogs. The world of animals is his world, it is much easier for him to find a common language with animals than with people. Egor dreams of becoming part of the family of Nikolai Ivanovich, the owner of the station, and for this he is ready to do anything.

== Cast ==
- Stepan Devonin as Yegor
- Dmitriy Podnozov as Nikolai Ivanovich
- Yana Sekste as Dasha
- Ekaterina Vasiljeva as Nina
- Viktor Ovodkov as Vanya
- Yevgeny Sytyy as Vladimir
- Aleksey Chubkin as dog breeder
- Giuliano Di Capua as Giuliano
- Aleksey Kashnikov as Valera
- Elena Papanova as aunt
- Darya Savelyeva as Ulia
