= Evgueni Galperine =

Evgueni Galperine Евгений Галперин
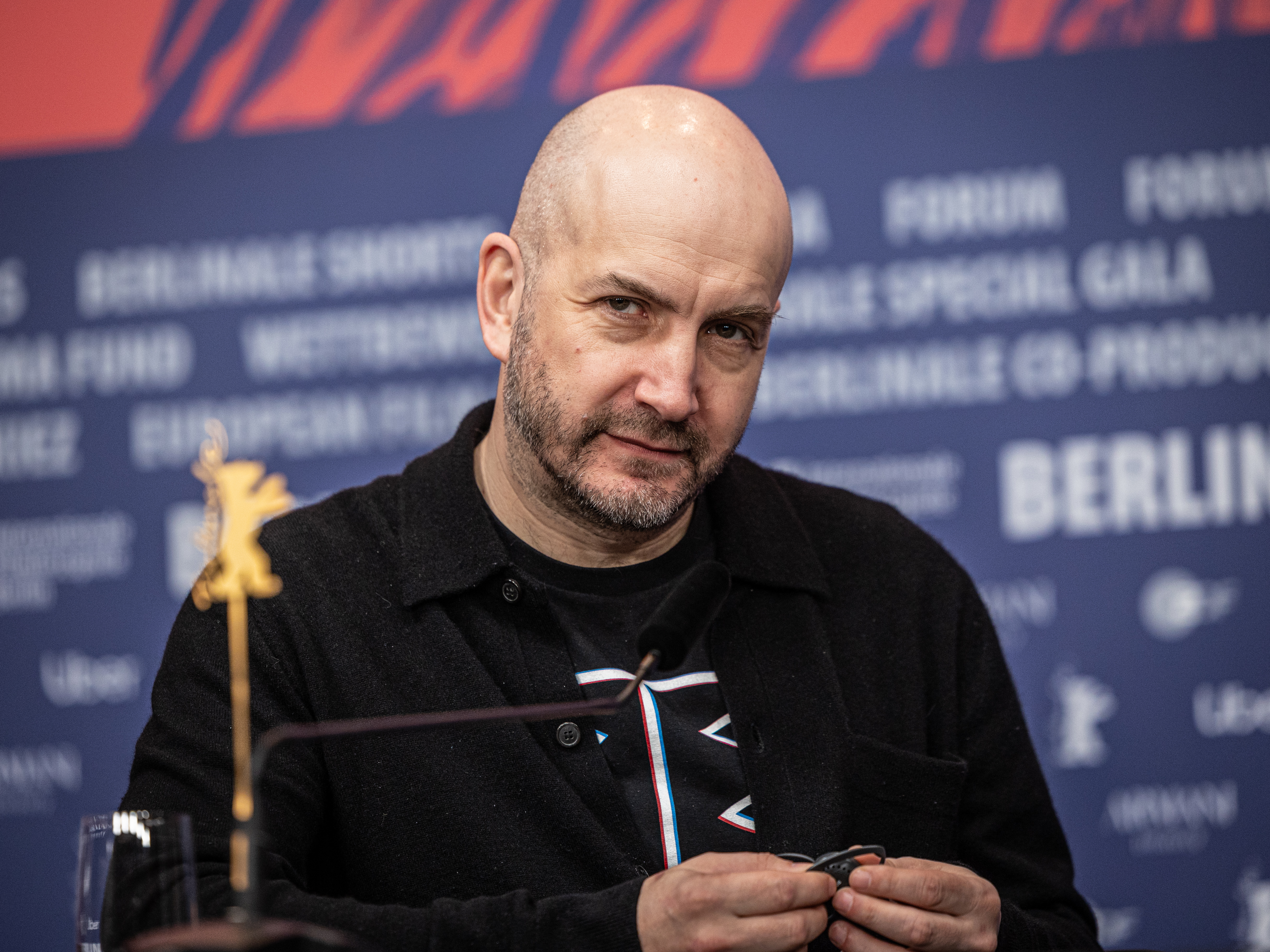
- Galperine in 2024

Background information
- Born: 1974 (age 51–52); Chelyabinsk, Soviet Union (now Chelyabinsk, Russia)
- Years active: 1999-present
- Label: ECM Records
- Website: https://galperine-galperine.com/

Evgueni Galperine (born 1974) is a Russian-French composer. He moved to Paris, France, in 1990. Evgueni followed in the footsteps of his father Youli Galperine, a Russian composer, and is principally known for his film music, which he often creates in collaboration with his brother Sacha Galperine. More recently, he has started to focus more on his music outside of films, culminating in the album Theory of Becoming, released on ECM Records.

== Biography ==
Evgueni Galperine was born in Chelyabinsk, in the Urals, where he spent his early childhood before moving to Kyiv with his parents and his brother Sacha, who was barely one year old at the time. Four years later, the family moved to Moscow where Evgueni continued his studies, first at a conservatory and then at the Gnessin State Musical College. At the age of 16, the whole family moved to France where Evgueni studied composition at the Boulogne Conservatory. He was admitted to the Conservatoire de Paris in 2000, where he studied music theory and composition. He then went on to compose for concerts, theatre and advertising.

Since 2003, he has devoted much of his work to film music, first as a solo artist, then as a duo (since 2009) with his brother Sacha. The career of the two brothers began with the production of the soundtrack for the 2010 film The Big Picture by Éric Lartigau.

The brothers' soundtrack to Andrey Zvyagintsev's film Loveless received the European Film Academy (EFA) award for the best film score of the year in 2017 and IndieWire ranked it among the top ten scores of the year.

In addition to European cinema where Evgueni has collaborated with directors such as Andrey Zvyagintsev, François Ozon, Marjane Satrapi, Asghar Farhadi, Luc Besson, he has also collaborated with American directors such as Barry Sonnenfeld (The Addams Family and Men in Black) or Barry Levinson (Rain Man, Sleepers and Wag The Dog). In addition, his and his brother’s music is often used in films as additional music: Jacques Audiard's Rust and Bone, Gary Ross' The Hunger Games, Night Shyamalan's Split, etc. In 2017, when Galperine was ready to recommit to contemporary composition – and to begin work on Theory of Becoming (finally realized and released in 2022) – Andrey Zvyagintsev asked him to contribute music for the film Loveless. The director asked Evgeni to write the music without reading the script and without seeing the film. In regard to this, Evgeni said "Once you find yourself writing music from three sentences, without images, you are no longer a composer of film music. You have no reference points other than yourself." The film was awarded the Jury Prize at the 2017 Cannes Film Festival.

Among his "emotional influences", Galperine cites Modest Mussorgsky, Dmitri Shostakovich, and Claude Debussy and, among more recent composers, Arvo Pärt, György Ligeti and Steve Reich.

== Discography ==
- Theory Of Becoming, 2022, ECM Records

== Filmography ==
- Loveless - 2018
- The Last Queen - 2022
- Once Upon a Studio - 2023
- Block Pass (La Pampa) - 2024
- Kraven the Hunter - 2024
- Architecton - 2024
- Baby Reindeer - 2024
- Julian - 2025
- Notes of a True Criminal - 2025
- Minotaur - 2026
- Butterfly Jam - 2026
