= Alexander Rodnyansky =

Ukrainian film director (born 1961)

- Олександр Роднянський
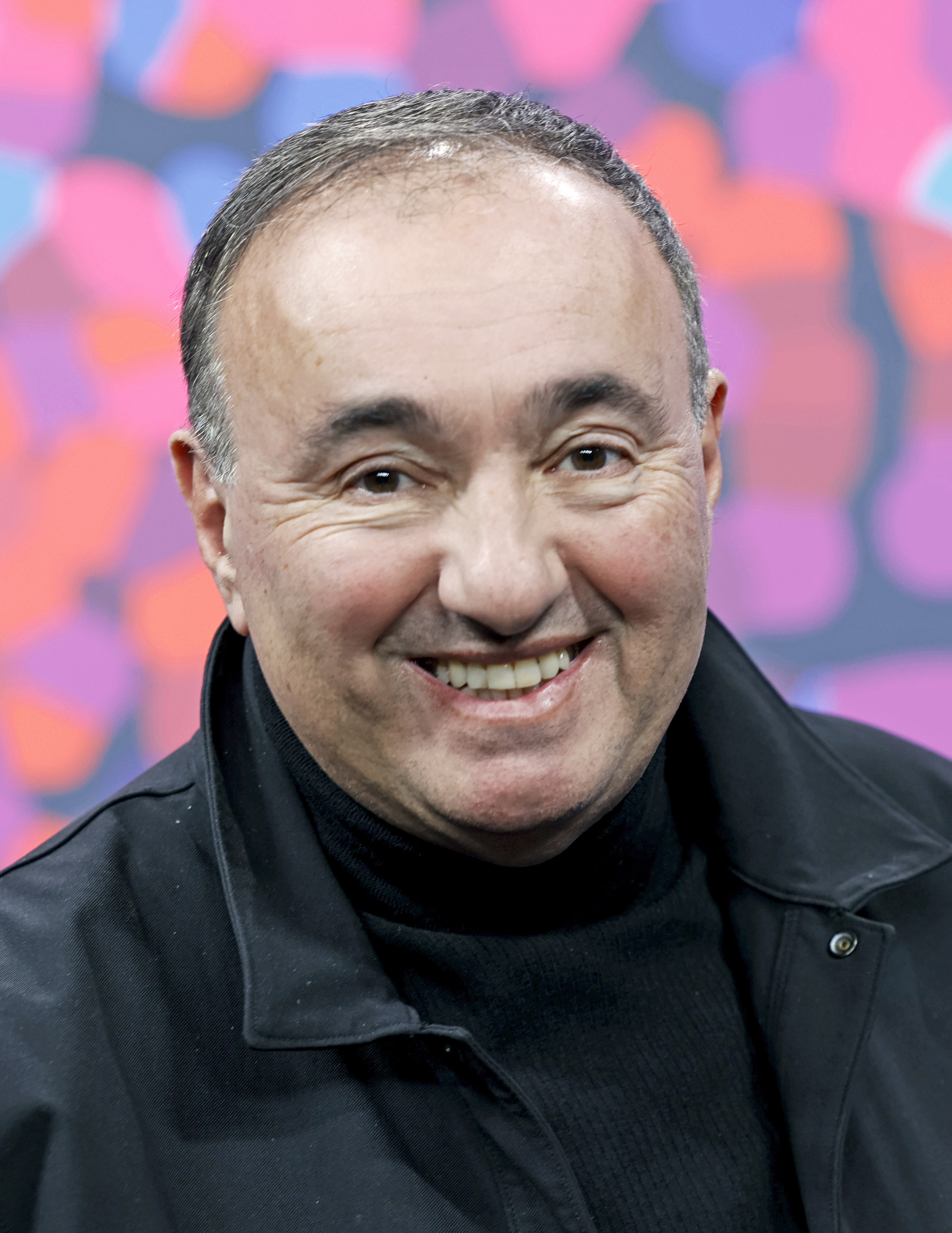
- Rodnyansky in 2026
- Born: Oleksandr Yukhimovich Rodnyansky; July 2, 1961 (age 65); Kyiv, Ukrainian SSR, Soviet Union
- Citizenship: Ukraine
- Education: Kyiv National I. K. Karpenko-Kary Theatre, Cinema and Television University
- Occupation: Film producer
- Years active: 1982–present
- Spouse: Valeriya Rodnyanskaya
- Children: 2

Alexander Yefimovych Rodnyansky (Ukrainian: Олекса́ндр Юхи́мович Родня́нський, romanized: Oleksandr Yukhymovych Rodnianskyi, Russian: Александр Ефимович Роднянский; born July 2, 1961) is a Ukrainian film director, film producer, television executive and businessman. As a media-manager Rodnyansky founded the first Ukrainian independent television network 1+1 and ran Russian CTC Media, which under his management became the first Russian media company to publicly trade on NASDAQ.

During his career, Rodnyansky has produced over 30 films and more than 20 television series. Some of his most notable projects including Elena (2011), Leviathan (2014) and Loveless (2017) directed by Andrey Zvyagintsev, The Duelist (2016) directed by Aleksey Mizgirev, The Man Who Surprised Everyone (2018) directed by Aleksey Chupov and Natasha Merkulova, Beanpole (2019) directed by Kantemir Balagov, Mama, I'm Home (2021) directed by Vladimir Bitokov and Unclenching the Fists (2021) directed by Kira Kovalenko.

Films produced by Rodnyansky many times won top prizes at the Cannes Film Festival. Among the awards won by his films – Golden Globe Award for Leviathan, Grand Prix of Un Certain Regard program for Unclenching the Fists and César Award for Loveless. Rodnyansky won the GQ Russia Man of the Year (producer) award three times. He is a member of the European Film Academy and Asia Pacific Screen Awards.

Rodnyansky is a Member of The Academy of Motion Picture Arts and Sciences, four of his films were nominated for an Oscar in the Best Foreign Film category: A Chef in Love, East/West, Leviathan and Loveless.

Among other films that Alexander Rodnyansky produced are Stalingrad (2013), the highest grossing Russian film at the time. Among other films produced by Rodnyansky: A Chef in Love (1997), East/West (1999), A Driver for Vera (2004), The 9th Company (2005), The Sun (2005), Heat (2006), Piter FM (2006) and The Inhabited Island (2009). He created Ukrainian TV network 1+1 and for seven years was the CEO of a Russian media company CTC Media.

Variety500 index names Alexander Rodnyansky as one of the 500 most influential business leaders shaping the global media industry.

== Family and education ==
Rodnyansky was born in Kyiv to Jewish parents Efim Naumovich Fridman and Larisa Zinovyevna Rodnyanskaya. Both parents worked at the Ukrainian film studio 'Kontakt'. His father Yefim Fridman was a senior engineer, while his mother Larisa Rodnyanskaya worked as a film producer and later was assigned director of the 'Kontakt'. Alexander's maternal grandfather Zinovy Rodnyansky was chief editor of the Ukrainian documentary film studios, his cousin Esfir Shub was a prominent Soviet director. Alexander's cousin Boris Fuchsmann is a German media mogul and investor, he is also the vice-president of the World Jewish Congress and the President of Jewish Confederation of Ukraine. Together the cousins co-founded the 1+1 TV Channel and built the Hilton hotel in Kyiv. Irina Rodnyanskaya, Alexander's aunt-cousin, was a prominent Russian critic and literary historian, laureate of the Pushkin Prize and the Solzhenitsyn Prize. His cousin once removed Lazar Rodnyansky was a Soviet engineer, laureate of the Lenin Prize for creation of the Myasishchev M-4 bomber.

Due to the busy schedule of his parents, Alexander was raised by his grandfather and given his surname. Rodnyansky graduated from Kyiv's National University of Film, Theatre and Television as a documentary director. He studied under Felix Sobolev.

== Career ==
=== Documentaries ===
In 1983 Rodnyansky started his career at Kyivnaukfilm studio. At that time he was making documentaries on ecology and politics. He directed 10 feature short motion pictures which won him over 40 prestigious awards both at home and abroad. For the documentary Raoul Wallenberg's Mission he was awarded the highest award for a documentary filmmaker in the USSR – the Russian National Film Award NIKA as well as the European Film Award (for Best Documentary).

In 1990 Rodnyansky was invited to 'Innova Film', founded by Germany ZFD channel. His 1991 film Last farewell USSR was awarded the Gran Prix of Cinema Jove Film Festival in Valencia, Russian National Film Award NIKA, Special Jury prize at the Festival International de Cinema Nyon and the Best Documentary prize at the Duisburg Film Festival.

From 1990 till 1994, he worked as a producer and film director at the German television channel ZDF.

=== TV ===
When Leonid Kuchma became the President, Rodnyansky returned to Ukraine. With a start-up capital of $400,000, Rodnyansky and his cousin Boris Fuchsmann co-founded the 1+1 Channel. They were given 2.5 hours of daily screen time on the state channel UA:First. The channel was in a poor state then, it was unprofitable and had only 7% of the audience. Under new management, in two years 1+1 became the leader of the television market in Ukraine. Rodnyansky served as CEO and was a co-owner of the company together with Central European Media Enterprises (CME). On January 1, 1997, 1+1 started broadcasting on the UT-2 Ukrainian State Channel. In 1997, Rodnyansky sold his 30% of shares in 1+1 to CME for $22 mln. Later, in 2005–2008, CME bought 100% of shares.

In 2002 Peter Gerwe asked Rodnaynsky to head the American company Story First Communication (later renamed CTC Media) which operated one TV-channel – CTC. Rodnaynsky started buying licenses on Western TV series and shows and produced their localisation for Russia. Under his leadership the company transformed into an international television powerhouse with five channels in three countries.

Rodnyansky led CTC Media to become the first ever Russian media company with an IPO on NASDAQ. In 2002 the CTC Channel had a market value of approximately $40 million; when Rodnyansky left CTC Media in 2008, the company's market capitalization was over $4 billion; CTC doubled its audience share and became the fourth most popular channel in Russia.

=== Later Business ===
In 2009 Rodnyansky founded A.R. Films and purchased 51% of shares of Sergey Melkumov's Non-Stop Production. At the end of 2009 he acquired 51% of the A Company, which also had a stake in Filmklik. In Spring 2010 Rodnyansky bought majority share in Cinema Without Limits (Russian Company). In 2011 A.R. Films acquired 'A Company', founded by Alexander Van Dulmen. In 2012 it launched 'A Company Distribution' in Russia that soon started collaborating with the 20th Century Fox on domestics releases. It also produced and distributed Non-Stop Production's movies and TV series. Also in 2011 Alexander Rodnyansky's A.R. Films purchased 51% of Berlin-based A Company Consulting and Licensing, one of the biggest film licensing and distribution outfits in Central and Eastern Europe.

In 2015 'A Company' declared bankruptcy, Rodnyansky withdrew €10 mln shortly before. The bankruptcy supervisor Tornsten Martini sued A.R. Films for €2 mln, in March 2018 the Berlin court ordered A.R. Films to pay, however, the order wasn't executed. In 2019 the second sue followed, $3.8 mln were added to the previous fine. Later, the producer settled all legal issues with opponents and sold his part to AR Films.

In 2018 Rodnyansky announced the establishment of a new, Hollywood-based company AR Content to work on international projects.

=== Cinema and TV Series ===
In 2011 Alexander Mindadze's film Innocent Saturday produced by Alexander Rodnyansky premiered in competition at the 61st Berlin International Film Festival and received a Golden Eagle for Best Script in 2012. In the same year, Andrey Zvyagintsev's Elena, also produced by Rodnyansky, won The Special Jury Prize in the Un Certain Regard category at the 2011 Cannes Film Festival. In 2012, Elena won four Golden Eagles for Best Picture, Best Director, Best Cinematography and Best Supporting Actress. In the television mini-series category, Dostoevsky, produced by Rodnyansky's Non-Stop Production, won three Golden Eagles, for Best Television Drama and for Best Actor and Best Supporting Actress in a TV Drama.

Jayne Mansfield's Car, a family comedy/drama directed by Billy Bob Thornton became the first US film, produced by Alexander Rodnyansky. The ensemble cast included Robert Duvall, John Hurt, Kevin Bacon, Robert Patrick, Frances O'Connor and Ray Stevenson.

In 2012, Rodnyansky partnered with director Robert Rodriguez to produce a sequel to the 2010 film Machete, Machete Kills, and the cult 2005 film Sin City, Sin City: A Dame to Kill For, based on the graphic novel by Frank Miller. Cloud Atlas, directed by The Wachowskis and Tom Tykwer, and co-produced by Alexander Rodnyansky, was released in 2012 in Russia by A Company and grossed $16.5 mln.

In 2013 Alexander Rodnyansky produced with his partner Sergey Melkumov an epic war drama Stalingrad, directed by Fedor Bondarchuk. Stalingrad has opened to $8.3 million in China on 7,136 screens, including 123 in Imax 3D making it the best-ever start for a non-Chinese and non-Hollywood film in the country.

After 2013 Rodnyansky decided to specialize in art house cinema genre.

In 2014 Leviathan directed by Andrey Zvyagintsev and produced by Alexander Rodnyansky premiered in competition of 2014 Cannes Film Festival. The Guardian called the film "a new Russian masterpiece", while IndieWire gave it an "A+". Leviathan won the award for The Best Screenplay and was picked up for US distribution by Sony Classics.

Leviathan won the Best Film Award at the BFI London Film Festival and the Best Foreign Language Film award at the 72nd Golden Globe Awards. It was also nominated for an Best Foreign Language Film Award at the 87th Academy Awards. Leviathan was also nominated for BAFTA Award for Best Film Not in the English Language and an Independent Spirit Award for Best International Film.

In 2016 The Duelist directed by Aleksey Mizgirev and produced by Alexander Rodnyansky was screened at the 2016 Toronto International Film Festival.

In 2016 Alexander Rodnyansky was invited to the Jury of the Caméra d'Or program of the Cannes Film Festival. In June 2016 he became the member of The Academy of Motion Picture Arts and Sciences.

In 2017 Loveless directed by Andrey Zvyagintsev and produced by Alexander Rodnyansky premiered in competition of the 2017 Cannes Film Festival. Loveless won the Jury Prize at Cannes. and The Best Film Award at BFI London Film Festival. In September 2017 the Russian Oscar committee nominated Loveless as a Russian entry into the Oscar race for Academy Award for Best Foreign Language Film at the 90th Academy Awards and was nominated in final shortlist. Another film produced by Alexander Rodnyansky – Requiem for Mrs. J directed by Bojan Vuletić was nominated by Serbia as their entry into the Oscar race.

In 2018 The Man Who Surprised Everyone, directed by Aleksey Chupov and Natasha Merkulova and produced by Alexander Rodnyansky premiered at the 75th Venice International Film Festival. It won the Best Actress Award at the Horizons (Orizzonti) section.

In 2019 Beanpole directed by Kantemir Balagov and produced by Alexander Rodnyansky premiered in the Un Certain Regard section of the 2019 Cannes Film Festival. Beanpole won the Un Certain Regard Best Director Award and the FIPRESCI Prize for Best Film in the Un Certain Regard section. It was selected as the Russian entry for the Best International Feature Film at the 92nd Academy Awards, making the December shortlist. In 2020 when Beanpole was released in the US, it gathered almost universal critical praise – 92% at review aggregator Rotten Tomatoes. Beanpole was included in Best Films of 2020 tops by the Los Angeles Times, Esquire, The Hollywood Reporter, IndieWire, CBS , The Playlist, Vulture, and The Rolling Stone. Former US president Barack Obama named Beanpole among his favourite films of 2020.

Variety included Alexander Rodnyansky in its Variety500 index of the 500 most influential business leaders shaping the global entertainment industry. In 2021 his AR Content production company signed a first look deal with Apple TV+.

In 2021 Unclenching the Fists, directed by Kira Kovalenko and produced by Alexander Rodnyansky became the first Russian film in history to win the Grand Prix of Un Certain Regard program in 2021 Cannes Film Festival. Also in 2021 Vladimir Bitokov's movie Mama, I'm Home was included into the Orizzonti Extra program of the 78th Venice International Film Festival.

After the beginning of Russian war in Ukraine, Rodnyansky publicly announced that all of his Russian projects are put on hold or closed. Following the invasion, he will focus on his American company AR Content, which develops English-language and multi-lingual feature films, documentaries and television shows, including Khan with FOX Entertainment and Red Rainbow, to be directed by Emmy-winning director Andrij Parekh.

In February 2023 Rodnyansky announced that The Killing and Suicide Squad alum Joel Kinnaman will star in AR Content's adaptation of John Nixon's Debriefing the President. Kinnaman will play a former CIA analyst Nixon who wrote the non-fiction book about his experience of being the first American to identify and interrogate Saddam Hussein following his 2003 capture.

In 2024 Rodnyansky announced that the strategy would be “building a hub” of European and international talent and uniting them with Hollywood through his banner AR Content. As a part of this strategy Alexander Rodnyansky already announced the following films: At The Sea by Kornel Mundruzo, starring Amy Addams, Orphan directed by Oscar-winning Hungarian director Laszlo Nemes, first English-language film of Kantemir Balagov Butterfly Jam, produced in cooperation with Why Not Productions and October 7 attacks aftermath film Of Dogs And Men, directed by Dani Rosenberg.

Of Dogs And Men premiered in 2024 in Venice. In 2025 Dreams, a film directed by Michel Franco and produced by Alexander Rodnyansky premiered in competition of the Berlin Film Festival followed by the in competition premiere of Orphan, directed by Laszlo Nemes and produced by Rodnyansky in Venice.

In 2025 after a 31-year hiatus Alexander Rodnyansky returned to documentary filmmaking with Notes of a True Criminal. In his film, Rodnyansky contemplates key events in Ukraine’s history and how they have affected him and his family: the referendum on Ukraine’s independence, the mass execution of Jews at Babyn Yar, and the Soviet authorities’ attempt to erase the memory of this tragedy. Chernobyl, the collapse of the Soviet Union, the withdrawal of Soviet troops from Germany, and, of course, the war—the full-scale invasion by the Russian army, which began on February 24, 2022. Notes of a True Criminal were selected to premiere out of competition at the Venice Film Festival. Tel Aviv-based documentary sales outfit Cinephil has acquired world rights to the film.

In 2026, At the Sea, produced by Rodnyansky and directed by Kornél Mundruczó, was shown in competition at the Berlin Film Festival. That same year in Cannes, Butterfly Jam, directed by Kantemir Balagov and produced by Rodnyansky, opened the programme of the parallel Directors’ Fortnight section.

In May 2026, Alexander Rodnyansky announced his new project, The Extremists, directed by Alexander Molochnikov. The film is based on Molochnikov’s short film The Extremist, which was inspired by the story of artist Sasha Skochilenko. Molochnikov’s short film won the award for Best Live Action Film and the Special Jury Prize at the British Academy’s student awards, the Yugo BAFTA Student Awards, and was shortlisted for the Academy Award, making the 15-film shortlist. The new feature film will tell the stories of three very different people who found the courage to disagree with the decisions of the Russian leadership and speak out against Russia’s invasion of Ukraine.

American political thriller limited series High Value Target: The Hunt for Saddam, produced by Alexander Rodnyansky, premiered on September 13, 2026 on TNT and later on HBO MAX.

== Public and political views ==
As a Kyiv-born Ukrainian, Alexander Rodnyansky never held a Russian passport despite working in Russia for over 20 years. He holds a Ukrainian passport and has numerous friends and relatives in Ukraine, though his own family is Russian-speaking. In a 2014 interview he explained his point of view of the Crimea annexation. According to Rodnyansky, losing the Crimea in 1992 was perceived by the Russian society as the deepest psychological injury in recent history, and in public perception the annexation was inevitable. He recalled that in 1995 Aleksei Balabanov explained this to him and that during the years of its independence, Ukraine did nothing to the Crimea. Rodnyansky was sure though, that a war between Russia and Ukraine is impossible. In 2015 he explained that he sees deep flaws in both political systems, and expressed regrets, that Ukrainian culture and TV is controlled by the government as much as it is in Russia .

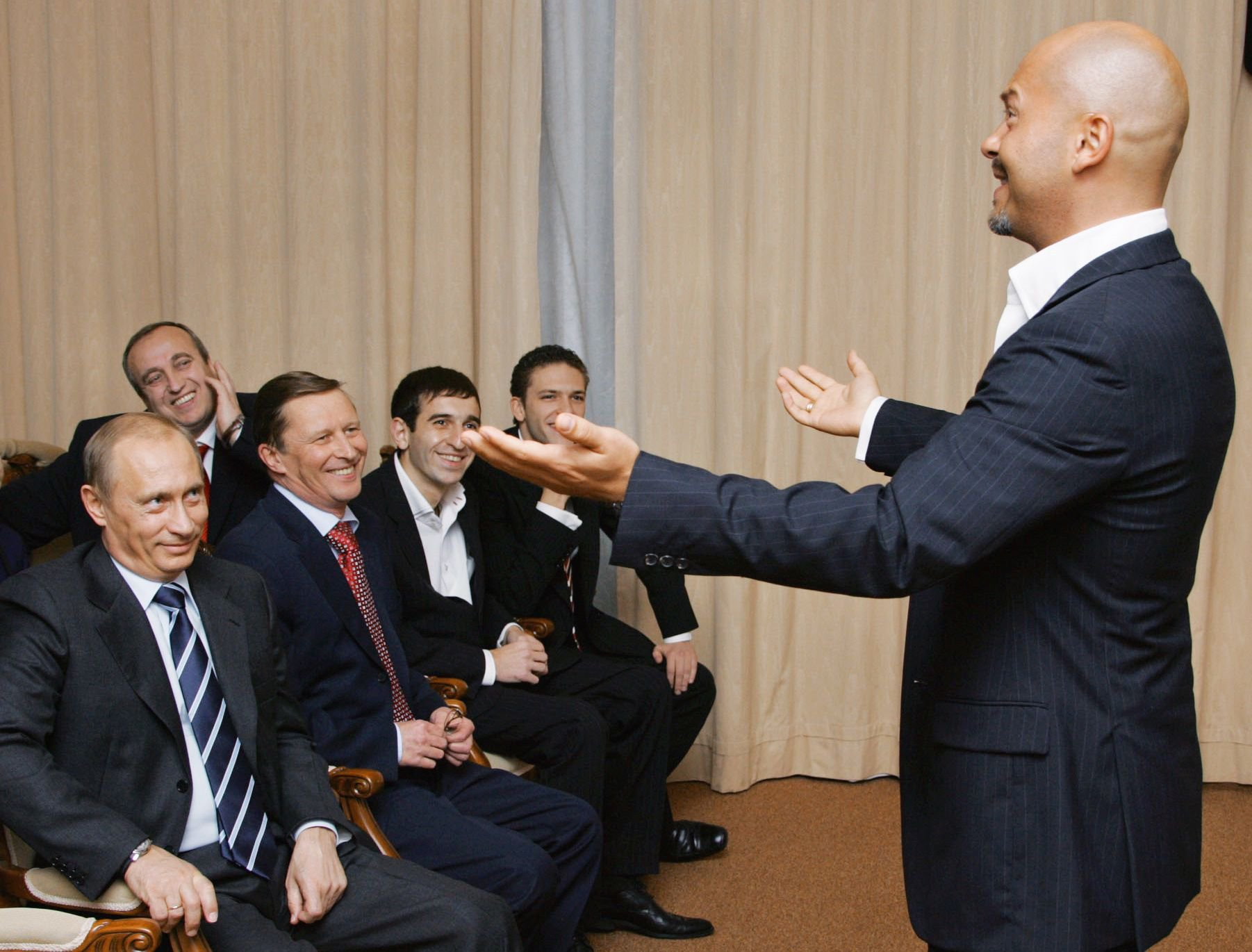
Rodnyansky with Russian President Vladimir Putin, Defense Minister Sergei Ivanov and film director Fyodor Bondarchuk on 7 November 2005

In a 2019 interview, Rodnyansky criticized self-censorship in Russia and its growing trend for self-isolation.

In April 2020 Rodnyansky's Non-Stop Production was excluded from the official register of the Russian State Cinema Committee which meant that they could no longer receive government fundings for their movie projects.

From the first day of war, Alexander Rodnyansky publicly opposed the Russian invasion of Ukraine. He gave multiple anti-war interviews to both film industry publications - Variety , Deadline and Screen International as well as international media.

Alexander Rodnyansky turned his personal Instagram account into an anti-war media, documenting for his largely Russia-based audiences the atrocities of war in Ukraine, including the massacre of Bucha and other war crimes perpetrated by the Russian army.

Jerusalem Post first reported that In the first hours of war Rodnyansky was instrumental in getting a Russian billionaire Roman Abramovich to help broker a peace process. This was later confirmed by UK and US media, including Sky News and Financial Times. Rodnyansky confirmed to FT his involvement. He said that Abramovich's influence over the Kremlin “was limited” but added that the billionaire was the only Russian figure who had agreed to help.

For his public anti-war position Minister of Defence of the Russian Federation Sergey Shoigu made a request to Minister of Culture Olga Lyubimova to eliminate "Rodnyansky from cultural agenda of Russia". In a letter leaked to a Russian publication Insider, Rodnyansky was named alongside Ukrainian president Volodymyr Zelenskyy. Rodnyansky responded, that he is independent and does not need state money, but he is deeply troubled that the directors that he worked with - Zvyagintsev, Balagov, Kovalenko - might also suffer and their films might be «excluded from the cultural agenda». Rodnyansky speaks up publicly not only against the war and the Putin regime, he also published an opinion piece in Financial Times urging the West not to isolate Russians, who oppose Putin, who were either forced to leave the country or trapped under Putin's regime.

A public pro-war group that lists "national traitors that pose threat to Russian interests" branded Alexander Rodnyansky as an "enemy" of the Russian state.

On October 21, 2022, Alexander Rodnyansky was declared to be a "foreign agent" by the Russian Ministry of Justice. A so-called “foreign agents” law, passed in 2012 and repeatedly expanded, allows the Justice Ministry to label for political reason opposition groups or individuals “foreign agents,” exposing them to fines and harassment that stymie their work.

On May 17, 2023, the Basmanny District Court of Moscow arrested Rodnyansky in absentia in connection on the charges of "spreading fake news" about the Russian army. There had been no previous reports of a criminal case against Rodnyansky. According to the court's press service, Rodnyansky, who is outside Russia, will be arrested once Russian authorities manage to detain him or to get him extradited.

On October 21, 2024 the Basmanny District Court of Moscow sentenced Alexander Rodnyansky to eight-and-a-half years in prison for speaking out against Russia’s invasion of Ukraine. In 2023 Rodnyansky wrote in the Guardian about his potential sentencing: “No other country in the world recognises this crime and I don’t either. I will continue to speak out against the invasion on every platform available to me". Russia has detained, fined and jailed thousands of people for opposing its Ukraine offensive since February 2022 – a crackdown rights groups have compared to the Soviet era.

== Personal life ==
Alexander Rodnyansky is married to Valeria Rodnyansky (née Miroshnichenko); the couple have a daughter, Ellen, and a son, Alexander.

In 2019, Alexander Rodnyansky Jr. was assigned Principal Economics Advisor of Ukrainian government.
