= Fidelity (2019 film) =

2019 film

- Film poster
- Directed by: Nigina Sayfullaeva
- Written by: Lyubov Mulmenko; Nigina Sayfullaeva
- Produced by: Sergey Kornikhin; Valery Fedorovich
- Starring: Evgeniya Gromova; Aleksandr Pal
- Cinematography: Mark Ziselson
- Music by: Andrey Dergachev
- Production companies: Droog Drooga; Premier (TNT)
- Distributed by: Walt Disney Studios Sony Pictures Releasing (WDSSPR)
- Release dates: 13 June 2019 (Kinotavr); 31 October 2019 (Russia)
- Running time: 82 minutes
- Country: Russia
- Language: Russian
- Budget: approx. $718,000
- Box office: $1,647,393

Fidelity (Russian: Верность, romanized: Vernost, also marketed as Infidelity) is a 2019 Russian erotic drama film directed by Nigina Sayfullaeva (ru), and starring Yevgenia Gromova, Aleksandr Pal, Marina Vasileva and Alexey Agranovich.

== Plot ==
Lena is a 30-year-old obstetrician-gynecologist. Her life is good, as her colleagues admire her and grateful patients express their gratitude to her. Her personal life is also without incident. Sergei, her caring husband, works as an actor in a drama theater and does not interfere in her affairs. But Lena suddenly notices significant changes in his conduct. An important aspect of their life is that they are not sexually active. Lena now believes her husband is cheating on her after reading a text message from Katya, Sergei's co-actor. She refuses to tolerate this and, in retaliation, cheats with an unknown man. Unexpectedly, a new universe opens up for her, full of passion and amazing feelings, which she uses to express her emotional state. Constant treachery, on the other hand, is becoming an inextricable aspect of her double life. She is portrayed as a woman in an unfulfilling marriage, who begins an uncontrollable double life of adulterous affairs.

== Cast ==
- Evgeniya Gromova as Lena
- Aleksandr Pal as Sergei
- Marina Vasileva as Katya
- Alexey Agranovich as Ivan
- Pavel Vorozhtsov as Vadim
- Anna Kotova as Nikiforova, Vadim's wife
- Anastasiya Denisova as Polina

== Release ==
"Fidelity" was shown at the 30th Open Russian Film Festival as part of the "Main Competition Program", where it received a "Special Jury Diploma" with the words "for the boundless faith of the actors in the director."

On March 9, 2020, the film received the main prize of the Russian Film Festival in Paris. The jury included writer and director Emmanuel Carrère, director of the Ciné+ TV channel Bruno Deloeste, and actress Dinara Drukarova.

== Box office ==
The film's budget was 76.3 million rubles, approximately, $718,000. Before its theatrical release on October 31, 2019, pre-sales touched $23,300. The first day of screening ticket revenue totaled $83,312; first weekend $720,227; and second weekend $329,336. It grossed a worldwide total of $1,647,393.

== Reception ==
- "A movie about jealousy, fidelty, sexuality, but overall about how society and your personal circles both stamp you as an outcast as well desire you as if you were a reflection of their own desires." - Daniel Schulz, Mubi.
- "Unlike some recent western productions, the production didn’t have “intimacy counsellors” to ensure the actors were comfortable whilst shooting of the most explicit scenes." - Geoffrey Macnab, Screendaily.

== See also ==
- 49th International Film Festival Rotterdam
