= A-Company Filmed Entertainment =

Film and video content provider

A Company Filmed Entertainment AG
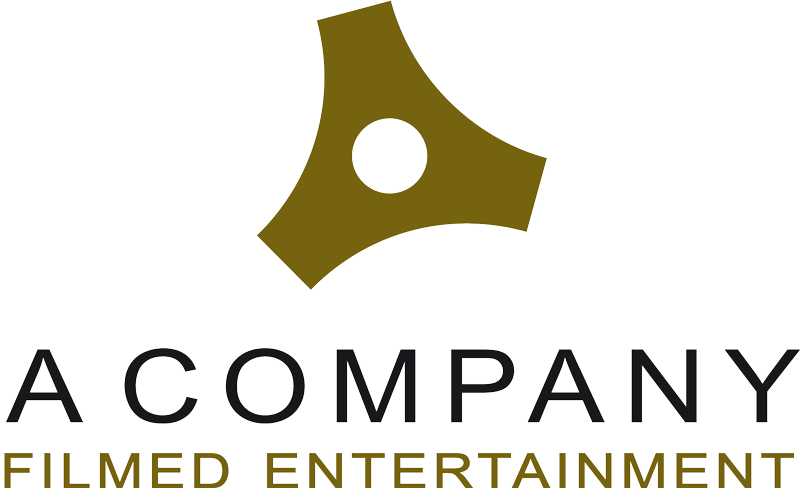
- Company type: Public
- Industry: Film industry, Film distribution, Film production
- Founded: 2002, Berlin, Germany
- Founder: Alexander van Dülmen
- Headquarters: Berlin, Germany
- Website: www.a-company-film.com

A Company Filmed Entertainment (commonly known as A Company) is an independent film and video content provider for Central and Eastern Europe, the Commonwealth of Independent States, and Vietnam. A Company distributes theatrical, home entertainment and television productions as well as Video-On-Demand.

A Company does its own distribution in Russia and Vietnam, and works through subsidiaries and distribution partners in several other countries. The company has a library of about 750 titles, including the Saw franchise, I, Frankenstein, Shutter Island, Cloud Atlas, The Little Prince, Sin City: A Dame to Kill For, The King's Speech, The Hurt Locker, and The Reader.

The company acquires film rights from independent studios, sales agents and production companies mainly in the US and Western Europe, and also carries local productions in its main operating areas.

== History ==
A Company Filmed Entertainment was founded by Alexander van Dülmen and five other shareholders in 2002 as A Company Consulting & Licensing. For many years A Company worked with local distributors in a number of countries. In 2008 it acquired a stake in Hungarian VOD-distributor Filmklik.

A Company's subsidiary Filmproduktionsgesellschaft was founded in June 2009 by Alexander van Dülmen, and participates as co-producer in German and International productions. Soon after, A Company set up its own distribution business. At the end of 2009 Alexander Rodnyansky acquired a majority share. In 2010 A Company acquired the majority share of Hungary's independent distributor Budapest Film, which since 2013 is operating under the name A Company Hungary. In 2011 EEAP Film Distribution CZ-SK was launched in Prague, to handle theatrical business in Czech Republic and Slovakia; the company's name was changed to A Company Czech in January 2014.

The main company was renamed A Company Filmed Entertainment in 2012 to reflect the expansion of the company. It operated in conjunction with Alexander Rodnyansky's AR Films.

In June 2012 a Russian distribution company, A Company Russia, was founded. They teamed up with 20th Century Fox to release Cloud Atlas in November 2012, generating about US$16 million box office. This film was also the first title to be released through A-Company Vietnam, a joint-venture between A-Company Filmed Entertainment and Nhiem van Nguyen, the former General Director of the Coloa Studio.

The company's subsidiary licensing arm Eastern European Acquisition Pool GmbH (EEAP) was renamed in 2013 to A-Company Film Licensing International.

In 2014, Rodnyansky was the chairman and majority shareholder of A Company. At that time, A-Company distribution companies were operating in Hungary, Czech Republic, Slovakia, Russia and Vietnam.

In 2015, after political instability in Ukraine and a financial downturn in Russia, the company became insolvent, and went through a period of debt restructuring. In 2016, A-Company was once more distributing films, including the comedy Kills on Wheels, which premiered at the Karlovy Vary International Film Festival.

== Film production ==
A Company also produces content through A Company Filmproduktionsgesellschaft. The projects are intended for distribution in Central and Eastern Europe and CIS.

Production overview:

- 2012: Cloud Atlas, directed by The Wachowskis and Tom Tykwer
- 2012: Measuring the World, directed by Detlev Buck
- 2013: Run Boy Run, directed by Pepe Danquart
- 2014: Madame Bovary, directed by Sophie Barthes
- 2015: Antalyagrad, in development
- 2016: Katharina The Great, in development
- 2021: Wet Dog, directed by Damir Lukačević

== On-Demand ==
Through A-Company On-Demand, A-Company has alliances with VOD players in the local markets, including Russia's Rostelecom. A-Company is also collaborating with iTunes, Google Play and Microsoft Xbox.
