= Notes of a True Criminal =

2025 documentary film

- International promotional poster
- Ukrainian: Нотатки справжнього злочинця
- Directed by: Alexander Rodnyansky; Andriy Alferov
- Written by: Alexander Rodnyansky
- Produced by: Beth Earl
- Cinematography: Oleksandr Boyko; Vadym Loshak; Denys Melnyk
- Edited by: Nazim Kadri-Zade
- Music by: Evgueni Galperine
- Production company: AR Content
- Release date: 3 September 2025 (Venice)
- Running time: 117 minutes
- Countries: Ukraine; United States
- Languages: Russian; Ukrainian

Notes of a True Criminal (Ukrainian: Нотатки справжнього злочинця, romanized: Zapiski nastoyashego prestupnika) is a 2025 documentary film directed by Alexander Rodnyansky and Andriy Alferov. It follows Rodnyansky's own personal history intertwined with Ukraine tumultuous recent history.

A co-production between the United States and Ukraine, the film had its world premiere out of competition at the 82nd Venice International Film Festival on 3 September 2025. It received positive reviews from critics.

== Production ==
An American-Ukrainian co-production, the film marked Alexander Rodnyansky's return to documentary form after a 31-years-long hiatus. The title ironically alludes to his being sentenced in absentia by a Russian court to 8.5 years in prison for his outspoken criticism of the Russian Invasion of Ukraine.

An exploration of about 80 years of Ukrainian history intertwined with Rodnyansky's family history, it uses archival footage alongside material from documentaries he shot during the early phase of his career. Rodnyansky described it as "the most personal film of my life" and funded it personally.

== Release ==
Venice Film Festival's artistic director Alberto Barbera offered Rodnyansky a spot at the festival months before the film was completed; the film eventually had its world premiere out of competition at the 82nd Venice International Film Festival.

== Reception ==
Variety's critic Jessica Kiang described the film as "sober, strikingly personal", ""anguished and absorbing", "powerful but pessimistic". Screen International's film critic Tim Grierson noted the film "invariably has stronger and weaker segments. But the intelligence brought to bear gives the film a spirit of inquisitive exploration."
