= Vladimir Bitokov =

Russian film director and screenwriter

- Владимир Артурович Битоков
- Born: 1985 (age 40–41)
- Occupations: Director, screenwriter
- Years active: 2010–present
- Known for: Deep Rivers, Mama, I'm Home

Vladimir Arturovich Bitokov (Kabardian: Битокъуэ Артурыкъуэ Владымыр; Russian: Владимир Артурович Битоков) is a Russian film director and screenwriter of Circassian ethnicity, student of Alexander Sokurov.

After school, Bitokov studied at the Kabardino-Balkarian State University in the English department. In 2010, when Sokurov launched his course at the KBSU, Bitokov entered the course and graduated in 2015 together with Kira Kovalenko, Alexander Zolotukhin and Kantemir Balagov. In 2014 Bitokov wrote a script that later was used for his movie Deep Rivers. With Sokurov's help, the movie was made in Kabardian that Bitokov himself knew poorly. Deep Rivers premiered at the Karlovy Vary International Film Festival and received numerous awards, including Best Director Debut at the 2018 Kinotavr.

After graduation, he worked as a live broadcast director at the Kabardino-Balkarian State Television and Radio Broadcasting Company. After the release of Deep Rivers, Bitokov had to work as a courier. His second movie Mama, I'm Home was produced by Alexander Rodnyansky and was selected to the Orizzonti Extra program of the 78th Venice International Film Festival.

In 2022, he made his debut as an actor in Eugene Grigoryev's film Breakneck Speed.

His series Natali i Aleksandr, dedicated to Natalya Goncharova and Aleksandr Pushkin, premiered in 2025.

== Personal life ==
Bitokov is married, the couple has two kids.
