= Marina Stepnova =

Russian writer and poet (born 1971)

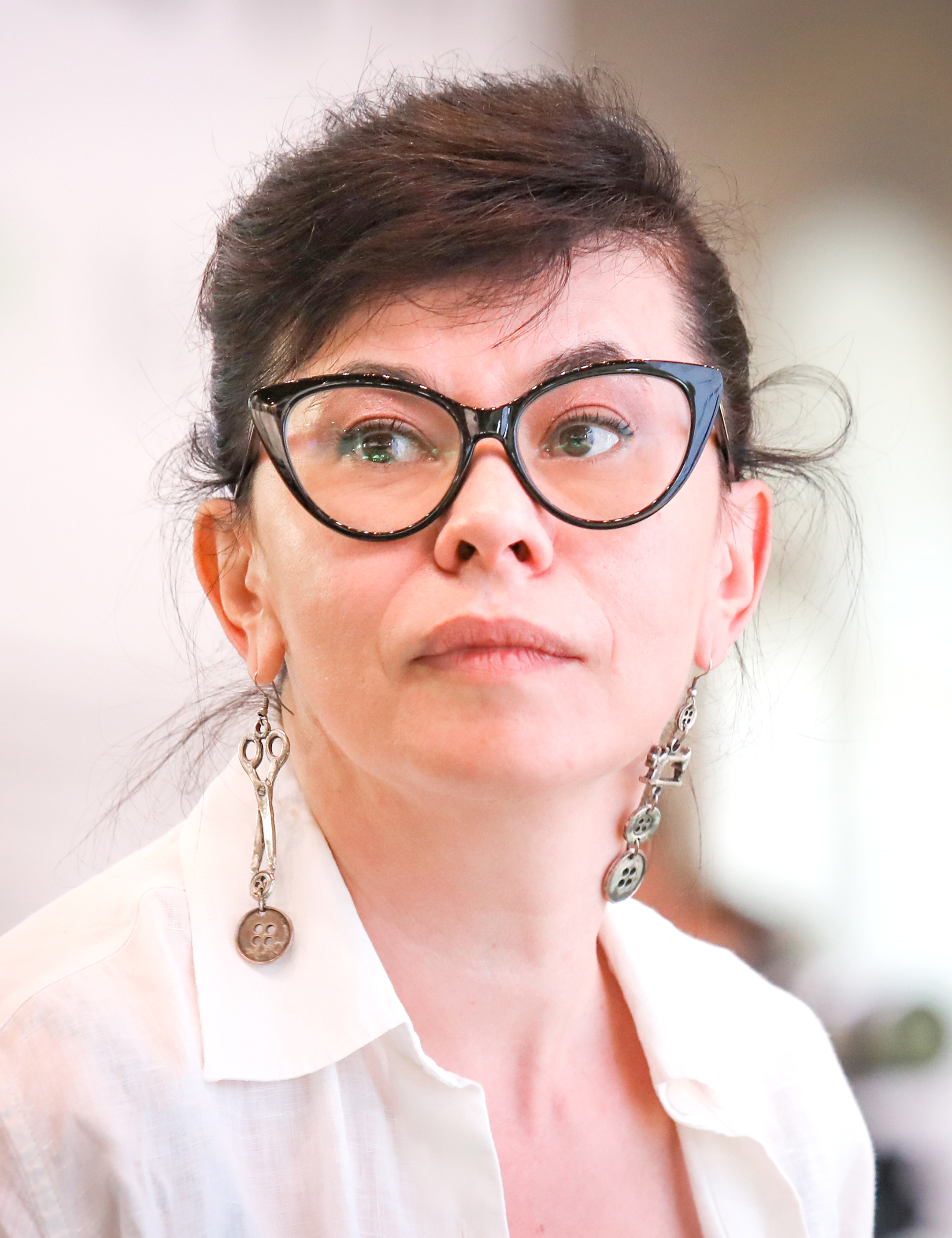
- Born: Marina Lvovna Rovner; 1971 (age 54–55); Yefremov, USSR
- Education: Maxim Gorky Literature Institute
- Occupations: writer, poet, screenwriter, teacher

Marina Lvovna Stepnova (née Rovner; born 2 September 1971, in Yefremov) is a Russian writer and poet, best known for her books Women of Lazarus (2011), which won the Big Book Award, and was nominated for the Russian Booker Prize and the Yasnaya Polyana Literary Award in 2012, and The Garden (2020), which won the Yasnaya Polyana Literary Award in 2021.

== Biography ==
=== Family and early years ===
She was born in Tula Oblast, in the family of a military man and a doctor. In 1981, the family settled in Chisinau. There, in 1988, she graduated from high school and entered the Moldova State University, where she studied the first three courses at the Faculty of Philology. She then transferred to the Translation Department of the Maxim Gorky Literature Institute in Moscow. A future Romanian translator left the university and a replacement was urgently needed. They came to Chisinau to look for such a candidate, as Moldovan and Romanian languages are identical, and in the end they chose Marina.

She graduated in 1994. In postgraduate studies at the Gorky Institute of World Literature she studied the works of Alexander Sumarokov.

=== Literary career ===
She started writing poetry at the age of 16 and wrote her first short story at the age of 23.

Stepnova served as editor-in-chief of Bodyguard, a specialized security magazine. From 1997 to 2014, she was editor-in-chief of XXL magazine.

In 2005, she made her debut as a writer with the novel The Surgeon, which explores themes of neomythology, history, generational trauma, and competition with God.

Her sophomore novel, The Women of Lazarus, was released in 2011. The book was an instant success, was subsequently translated into 15 languages, and earned Stepnova several major awards, including the 2012 Big Book Award.

Three years later, she released Godless Alley, a story of liberation from the Soviet past. Her next novel, The Garden, was released in 2020 and brought her the Readers' Choice 2021 Modern Russian prose at the Yasnaya Polyana Award.

Since 2017 she has been teaching literature at the Master's programme at the Faculty of Humanities at Higher School of Economics.

Stepnova is also active as a screenwriter. She created several TV projects. In 2020, she co-wrote the scenario for The Carpenter (2021 Russian Film) with Dunya Smirnova. One of her recent projects is Kantemir Balagov's English-language debut Butterfly Jam.

== Selected bibliography ==
- The Surgeon, 2005, novel
- The Women of Lazarus, 2011, novel
- Godless Alley, 2014, novel
- The Garden, 2020, novel
