= Natali i Aleksandr =

- Genre: Historical drama
- Written by: Natalya Kudryavtseva; Elena Lisasina; Ivan Lyrchikov; Dmitriy Voronkov
- Directed by: Vladimir Bitokov; Vladimir Shchegolkov
- Starring: Kseniya Treyster; Aleksandr Zaryadin; Danil Akutin; Polina Aug; Aleksei Barabash; Rostislav Bershauer
- Composers: Pyotr Frolov-Bagreev; Denis Pekarev

Production
- Producers: Aleksandr Akopov; Konstantin Ernst; Galina Kadantseva
- Cinematography: Ivan Kolpakov; Maksim Shinkorenko

Original release
- Network: Channel One
- Release: 17 February 2023

Natali i Aleksandr (Russian: Натали и Александр) is a 2025 Russian historical drama television series directed by Vladimir Bitokov and Vladimir Shchegolkov. It stars Kseniya Treyster and Aleksandr Zaryadin.

== Plot ==
The series tells the story of Natalia Goncharova and Alexander Pushkin's relationship, which became the happiest, yet most fateful, period of their lives.

== Cast ==
- Kseniya Treyster as Natalya Goncharova
- Aleksandr Zaryadin as Alexander Pushkin
- Danil Akutin as Dantes
- Polina Aug as Dolli Fikelmon
- Aleksei Barabash as Smirdon
- Rostislav Bershauer as Nikolai Goncharov

== Production ==
Filming took place at the Moskino cinema park.
