= Filmklik =

Hungarian video on demand service

Filmklik, Kft.
- Industry: Electronic commerce
- Founded: 2007
- Headquarters: Budapest, Hungary
- Area served: Hungary
- Key people: Peter Bognar, founder and CEO; Renaud Bekliz, project manager
- Products: Online Movie rental, Microsoft VC-1 video download
- Services: Online VOD rental
- Website: Filmklik.hu

Filmklik was a VOD service offering online streaming to customers in Hungary. Established in 2007 and headquartered in Budapest, the service offered movies from a large online catalogue always available on its platform. All the film content of the site was under DRM protection. In 2008, the distributor A Company acquired a stake in the company and developed plans to roll out the service outside Hungary. On its turn, the A Company including Filmklik was acquired by Alexander Rodnyansky.

== Films ==
Filmklik offered movies, which can either be downloaded to be burned on DVD and/or streamed instantly for 48 hours. Filmklik's library includes independent, international and studio films.
