= Mama, I'm Home =

- Directed by: Vladimir Bitokov
- Written by: Mariya Izyumova
- Produced by: Natalia Gorina; Aliona Kostenko; Sergey Melkumov; Alexander Rodnyansky
- Starring: Kseniya Rappoport; Yura Borisov; Alexander Gorchilin; Natalya Pavlenkova; Ekaterina Shumakova
- Cinematography: Ksenia Sereda
- Music by: Dmitry Evgrafov
- Release date: September 9, 2021
- Country: Russia
- Language: Russian

Mama, I'm Home (Russian: Мама, я дома, romanized: Mama, ya doma) is a 2021 Russian drama film directed by Vladimir Bitokov. The film was included into the Orizzonti Extra program of the 78th Venice International Film Festival. It was theatrically released in Russia on September 9, 2021.

== Plot ==
In Kabardino-Balkaria, a bus driver named Tonya is waiting for the return of her son, Zhenya, who left to fight in Syria. When she receives news of his death, she refuses to believe it and launches a relentless fight with local authorities, demanding his return. As Tonya confronts officials and stages protests, she becomes increasingly isolated, determined to defy the official narrative.

Then, one day, Zhenya appears at her door, apparently alive. Though everyone around her—including officials and neighbors—recognizes him as her son, Tonya senses something off. He lacks familiarity with intimate family details, and his demeanor feels foreign. As their strained relationship evolves from suspicion and fear to a fragile acceptance, Tonya wonders if the state has sent an imposter to silence her. Her hope and distrust collide, leading to a breaking point when Zhenya is threatened with arrest and decides to leave for yet another conflict. In the end, Tonya is left questioning whether she ever truly saw her son again or if her desperate grief created an illusion of his return.

== Cast ==
- Kseniya Rappoport as Tonya
- Yura Borisov as Zhenya
- Alexander Gorchilin as Nazarov
- Natalya Pavlenkova as Tonya's friend
- Ekaterina Shumakova as Kseniya, Tonya's daughter
- Darren Kushkhov as Egor
