= Lyubov Mulmenko =

Russian playwright, film director and screenwriter

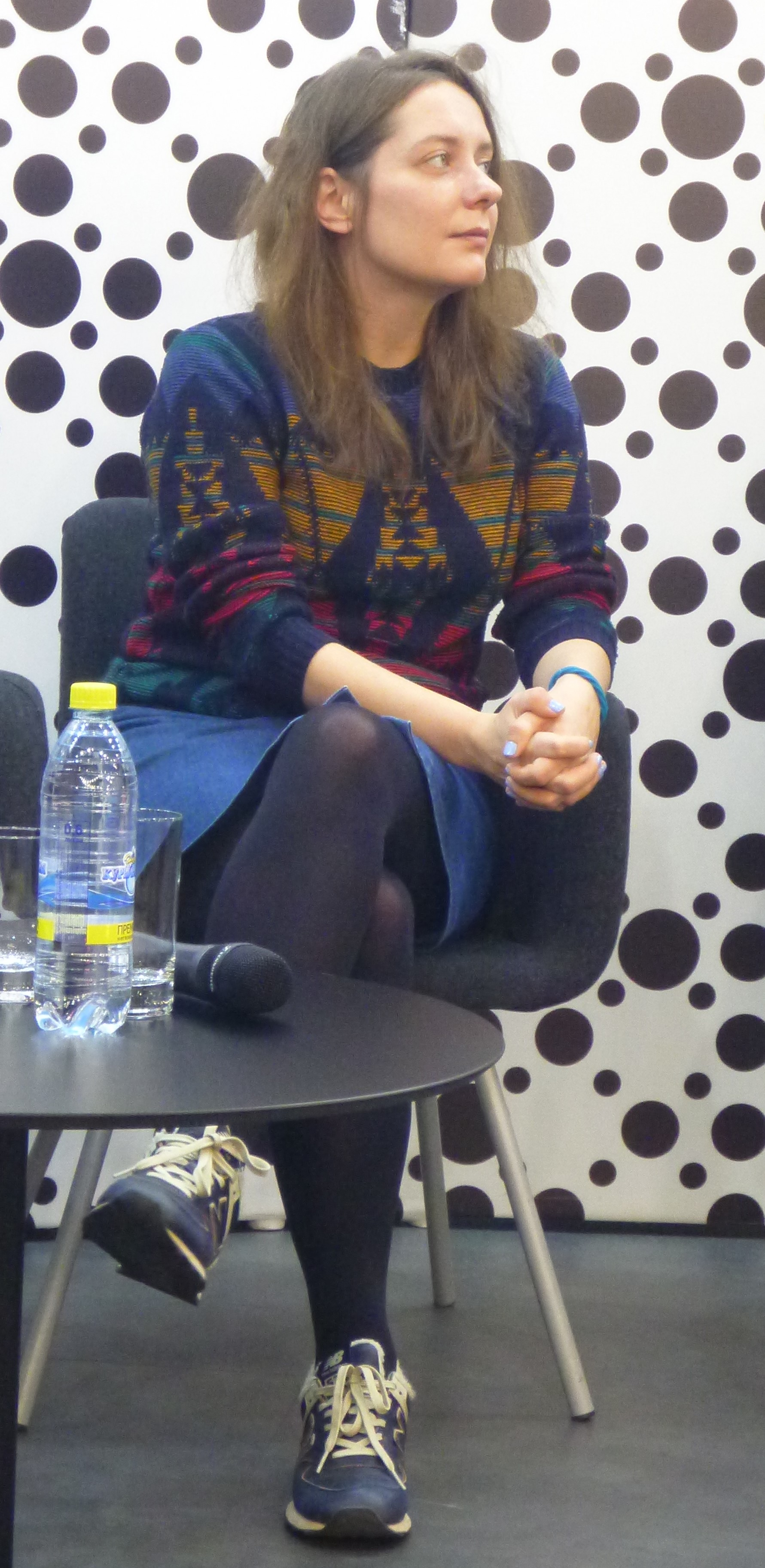
Mulmenko in 2021

Lyubov Nikitichna Mulmenko (Russian: Любовь Никитична Мульменко; 1 September 1985, Perm, Russia) is a Russian playwright, film director and screenwriter.

== Biography ==
She graduated from the Faculty of Philology of the Perm State University with a degree in journalism (2008) and art journalism courses at the Pro Arte Institute in St. Petersburg (2009).

In 2009 she made her theater debut with two documentary performances.

== Selected filmography ==
As screenwriter

- What is My Name (2014)
- About Love. For Adults Only (2017)
- Fidelity (2019)
- The Danube (2021)
- Unclenching the Fists (2021; dialogues)
- Compartment No. 6 (2021; dialogues)
- Jonjolie (2022)

As director

- The Danube (2021)
- Frau (2023)

== Awards and nominations ==
Awards

- Slovo Awards (2015) — Best Screenplay Debut in a Feature Film (One More Year; with Nataliya Meshchaninova)

Nominations

- Nika Awards (2015) — Discovery of the Year (Combine 'Nadezhda'; with Nataliya Meshchaninova)
- Russian Guild of Film Critics (2015) — Best Screenplay (One More Year; with Nataliya Meshchaninova), (Combine 'Nadezhda'; with Nataliya Meshchaninova); (2020) — Best Screenplay (Fidelity)
- Kinotavr (2021) — Full-Length Film (The Danube)

== Bibliography ==
- Zero One (play, 2009)
- Invocation (play, 2010)
- Antisex (play, 2011)
- Funny Panic Stories (2016)
