= The Danube (film) =

- Theatrical release poster
- Russian: Дунай
- Directed by: Lyubov Mulmenko
- Screenplay by: Lyubov Mulmenko
- Produced by: Valery Todorovsky; Anastasia Biryukova; Maxim Koroptsov
- Starring: Nadezhda Lumpova; Nenad Vasich
- Cinematography: Mikhail Khursevich
- Edited by: Alexander Krylov
- Production company: Marmot Film
- Distributed by: All Media; Start
- Release date: September 23, 2021
- Running time: 108 min.
- Country: Russia
- Languages: Russian; Serbian
- Box office: $6 556

The Danube (Russian: Дунай, romanized: Dunay) is a 2021 Russian film that was the directorial debut of screenwriter Lyubov Mulmenko. The film premiered on September 23, 2021 at the Kinotavr.

== Plot ==
Nadya arrives in Belgrade from Moscow for a vacation, where she unexpectedly meets the Serbian, Neša, who speaks a bit of Russian. She quickly becomes enamored with him, and a romance unfolds. Neša’s life couldn’t be more different from Nadya’s carefully organized existence in Moscow; he dresses in an eccentric, casual style, earns his money by juggling on the streets in front of stopped cars, and lives without the security of a permanent home or even a mobile phone. His carefree approach to life, far removed from the routines and expectations Nadya knows, immediately fascinates her, and she’s swept up in his relaxed, spontaneous way of living.

As she becomes more involved with Neša, Nadya finds herself letting go of her structured habits and embracing a freer lifestyle. This new perspective is thrilling, and she impulsively decides to stay in Belgrade to see where this adventure might lead. As days pass, the thrill of freedom fades, and Nadya begins to question her impulsive choices, realizing this unbound life may not be as enchanting as she first thought.

== Cast ==
- Nadezhda Lumpova as Nadya
- Nenad Vasich as Nesha

== Critical response ==
Film critic Anton Dolin in Meduza notes in his review:

Wherever you fly away, you will still take your personal Danube with you. There are borders that even rivers cannot cross.

In turn, Andrei Plakhov said:

The result is a film that is pleasant to watch, easy to breathe, and in which all the artistic elements seem to float freely with the flow, but are so adjusted to each other that it is impossible to find out where is whose gift. However, the impression of lightness is also deceiving: enough bitterness will accumulate in free floating to make the expected ending become an emotional shock.
