= Kantemir Balagov =

Russian filmmaker (born 1991)

- Бэлагъы Къантемыр
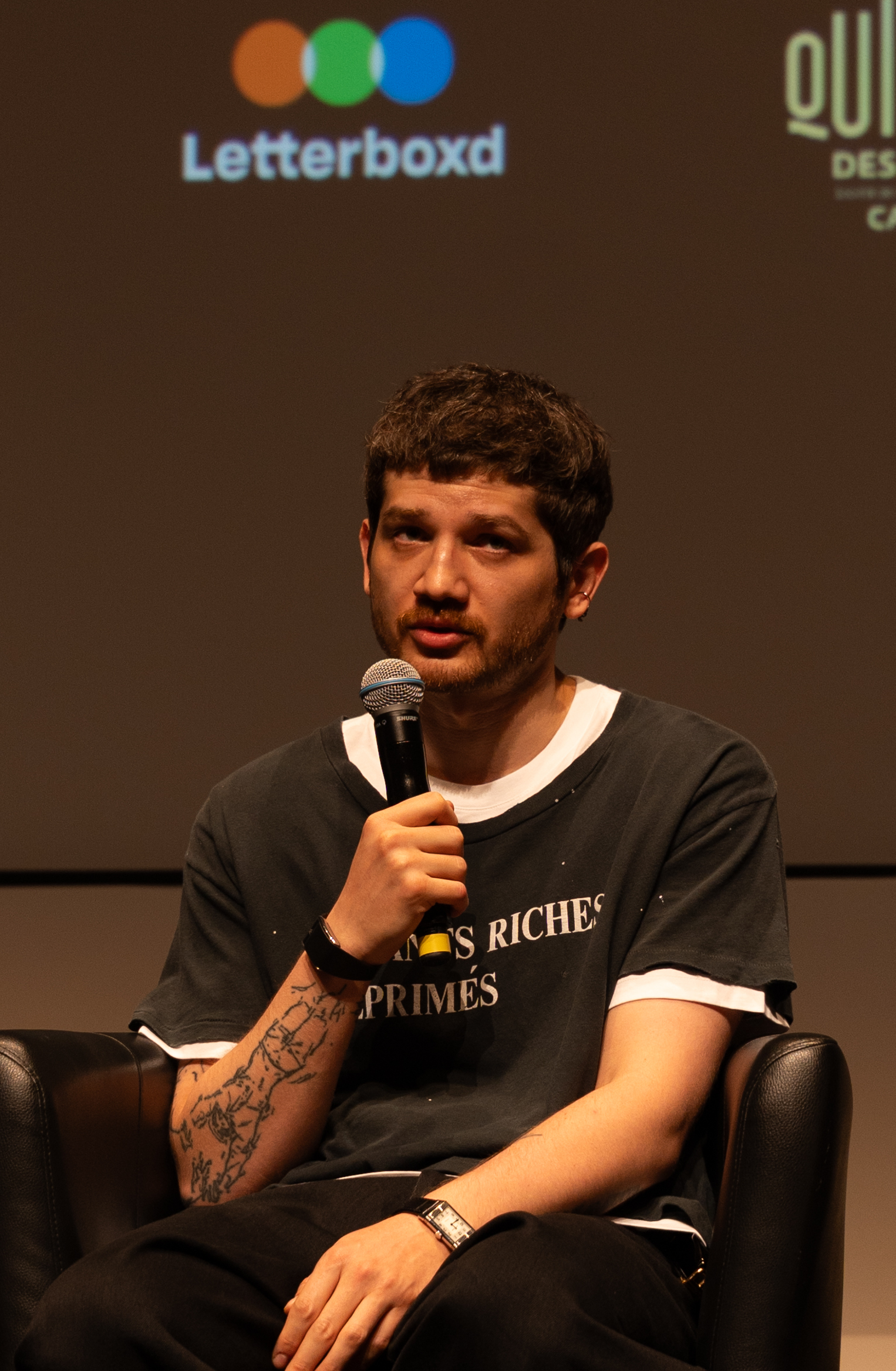
- Balagov in 2026
- Born: Kantemir Arturovich Balagov; 28 July 1991 (age 35); Nalchik, Kabardino-Balkarian ASSR, RSFSR, USSR
- Education: Kabardino-Balkarian State University
- Occupations: Film director, cameraman, screenwriter
- Years active: 2013–present
- Known for: Beanpole
- Partner: Kira Kovalenko

Kantemir Arturovich Balagov (Kabardian: Бэлагъы Артурыкъуэ Къантемыр, Russian: Кантемир Артурович Балагов; born 28 July 1991) is a Russian filmmaker and cinematographer. Most known for his award-winning drama films Closeness (2017) and Beanpole (2019).

== Early life ==
Balagov was born in Nalchik, Kabardino-Balkarian Autonomous Soviet Socialist Republic, RSFSR, in the final year of the Soviet Union, into a family with no connection to cinema. His mother is a chemistry and biology teacher who works as the head teacher at a local school, while his father is a local entrepreneur.

Since childhood, Balagov had been watching mainstream movies, and at the age of 18 began to create his own small videos. Then, together with friends in Nalchik, he shot an Internet series with episodes of 10 minutes each. He did not originally plan to pursue a career as a filmmaker, but decided to apply for the cinema workshop led by Alexander Sokurov at Kabardino-Balkarian State University in Nalchik. Balagov missed the deadline to enter the university as a freshman, but he still wrote to Sokurov asking Sokurov to consider his application. He eventually was accepted to the workshop as a third-year student. He graduated from university after studies in Sokurov's workshop. Directors Kira Kovalenko, Alexander Zolotukhin and Vladimir Bitokov were his fellow students.

== Career ==
=== 2010s ===
During his studies, Balagov directed several fiction and documentary short films. Kabardino-Balkarian State University: Aleksandr Sokurov Teaching Cinema (2014) was shown at the 67th Locarno Film Festival.

His debut feature Closeness (2017) was selected for the Un Certain Regard section of the 70th Cannes Film Festival, where it won the FIPRESCI prize. Set in 1998 at Nalchik, it follows a poor Jewish couple and the kidnapping of their youngest son and fiancé. The film received positive reviews. In the same year, he was awarded the GQ Russia Prize in the category Discovery of the Year.

Beanpole (2019) also had its world premiere in the Un Certain Regard section of the 72nd Cannes Film Festival, where Balagov won the section's Best Director prize, and the FIPRESCI prize once again. Set at the end of the Second World War, it follows Iya Sergeyevna, a tall woman nicknamed "Beanpole" (Дылда), who works as a nurse in a Leningrad hospital. The film received critical acclaim, and was selected as the Russian entry for Best International Feature Film at the 92nd Academy Awards, making the December shortlist, but was not nominated.

=== 2020s ===
In January 2021, Balagov was named as the director of the pilot episode of the The Last of Us television adaptation. But in October 2022, Balagov announced that he left the project mid-filming over creative differences, and the series' showrunner and creator, Craig Mazin, overtook over directing duties and credits for the pilot, although 40% of the footage shot by Balagov were retained in the final cut.

When Russia invaded Ukraine on 24 February 2022, Balagov condemned the war and left the country for exile in California. Shortly after, Balagov and his partner, the Russian filmmaker Kira Kovalenko, were chosen as Telluride Film Festival guest directors, at the 49th edition.

His English-language debut feature, Butterfly Jam (2026), had its world premiere as the opening film of the Directors' Fortnight section of the 2026 Cannes Film Festival. Produced by Pascal Caucheteux's Why Not Productions and Alexander Rodnyansky's AR Content. Filming began on 2 April 2025. It follows the Circassian diaspora in New Jersey.

== Personal life ==
Balagov is in a relationship with Russian filmmaker Kira Kovalenko.

=== Political beliefs ===
The couple fled Russia following the invasion of Ukraine, and the Russian government crackdown of anti-war protests and critics. They lived in exile in California between 2022 and 2025. Since the shooting of Butterfly Jam, Balagov and Kovalenko are based in France.

== Filmography ==
Year	English title	Original title	Notes
2017	Closeness	Теснота	
2019	Beanpole	Дылда	
2026	Butterfly Jam		English language debut
