= Closeness (film) =

2017 film

- Film poster
- Directed by: Kantemir Balagov
- Written by: Kantemir Balagov; Anton Yarush
- Produced by: Nikolay Yankin; Alexander Sokurov
- Starring: Darya Zhovner
- Cinematography: Artem Emelyanov
- Edited by: Kantemir Balagov
- Release date: 24 May 2017 (Cannes)
- Running time: 118 minutes
- Country: Russia
- Languages: Russian; Kabardian
- Box office: $184,008

Closeness (Russian: Теснота) is a 2017 Russian drama film directed by Kantemir Balagov, in his feature film debut. It was selected to compete in the Un Certain Regard section at the 2017 Cannes Film Festival. At Cannes, it won the FIPRESCI Prize in the Un Certain Regard section.

== Plot ==
In 1998 at Nalchik, 24-year-old Ilana (Zhovner) works in her father's garage to help him make ends meet. One evening, her extended family and friends gather to celebrate the engagement of her younger brother David. Later that night, the young couple is kidnapped, and a ransom demand delivered.

== Cast ==
- Darya Zhovner as Ilana
- Olga Dragunova as Adina
- Artem Tsypin as Avi
- Nazir Zhukov as Zalim
- Veniamin Katz as David
- Michail Amburg as Moshe

== Reception ==
=== Box office ===
Closeness grossed $184,008 worldwide.

=== Critical response ===
On review aggregator Rotten Tomatoes, the film holds an approval rating of 87% based on 15 reviews, with an average rating of 7.9/10. On Metacritic, the film has a weighted average score of 53 out of 100 based on 8 critics, indicating "mixed or average reviews". The film was criticized by some critics for its use of documentary video footage of the torture and killing of Russian soldiers from the Tukhchar massacre.
