= Unclenching the Fists =

2021 film

- Theatrical release poster
- Russian: Разжимая кулаки
- Directed by: Kira Kovalenko
- Written by: Kira Kovalenko
- Produced by: Sergey Melkumov; Aleksandr Rodnyansky
- Starring: Milana Aguzarova
- Cinematography: Pavel Fomintsev
- Edited by: Vincent Deveaux; Mukharam Kabulova
- Production company: Non-Stop Productions
- Distributed by: Pioneer
- Release dates: 10 July 2021 (Cannes); 25 September 2021 (Russia)
- Running time: 97 minutes
- Country: Russia
- Language: Ossetian

Unclenching the Fists (Russian: Разжимая кулаки, romanized: Razzhimaya kulaki) is a 2021 Ossetian-language Russian drama film directed by Kira Kovalenko. In July 2021, the film won the Un Certain Regard award at the 2021 Cannes Film Festival. It was selected as the Russian entry for the Best International Feature Film at the 94th Academy Awards, but it was not nominated.

== Plot ==
Ada, stifled by her overbearing father and by her lack of prospects, dreams of escaping from her life in a small town of Mizur in North Ossetia, Russia. Her father forbids her from leaving the house in the evenings, will not let her have longer hair, put on make up or receive surgery for her urinary incontinence due to the Beslan school siege. Ada thus has to wear adult diapers daily adding to her shame and isolation. Even her favourite brother whom she exposes the diapers is unable to help. A delivery boy chases after her, learnts her secret and when her father falls ill, she sees a way to escape.

== Cast ==
- Milana Aguzarova as Ada
- Alik Karayev as Father
- Soslan Khugayev as Akim
- Khetag Bibilov as Dakko
- Arsen Khetagurov as Tamik
- Milana Pagieva as Taira

== Reception ==
On review aggregator Rotten Tomatoes, the film holds an approval rating of 88% based on 24 reviews, with an average rating of 7.9/10. The website's critical consensus states: "A daring feature debut for director/co-writer Kira Kovalenko, Unclenching the Fists, explores how family ties can stifle as much as they support". On Metacritic, the film has a weighted average score of 68 out of 100, based on 10 critics, indicating "generally favorable reviews".

In their co-authored review for the Los Angeles Review of Books', Alex Bliziotis and Sasha Karsavina analyse the film as a metaphor for Russia's current cultural climate of historical revisionism, in which ethnic and linguistic minorities get erased and forgotten.

Salon.com's Gary M. Kramer, praised the director's view calling it "[an] urgent, unsentimental approach [is] what makes Unclenching the Fists so potent".

Diego Semerene of Slant Magazine wrote "Unclenching the Fists is a tale of how the desolation of a nation inhabits and engraves a woman's body".

== See also ==
- List of submissions to the 94th Academy Awards for Best International Feature Film
- List of Russian submissions for the Academy Award for Best International Feature Film
