= Kira Kovalenko =

Russian film director

Kira Takhirovna Kovalenko
- Born: 12 December 1989 (age 36); Nalchik, Kabardino-Balkarian ASSR, RSFSR, USSR
- Occupations: Director; screenwriter
- Years active: 2014–present
- Notable work: Sofichka (film), Unclenching the Fists
- Awards: Cannes Un Certain Regard (2021), Russian Guild of Film Critics (2022)

Kira Takhirovna Kovalenko (Russian: Кира Тахировна Коваленко, born 12 December 1989) is a Russian film director and screenwriter.

== Biography ==
After school, Kovalenko went to college and graduated in web-design. In 2010-2015 she studied at the Kabardino-Balkarian State University under Alexander Sokurov. Directors Kantemir Balagov, Alexander Zolotukhin and Vladimir Bitokov were her fellow students. During studies, Kovalenko directed several short movies.

After graduation, Kovalenko lived in Abkhazia, then in St Petersburg and Moscow. Her feature-length debut Sofichka (film) was based on Fazil Iskander's novel of the same name and was released in 2016. The movie was included in the competition program of the Tallinn Black Nights Film Festival and was awarded at the XV International Debut Film Festival ‘Fire Spirit’ in Khanty-Mansiysk.

Kovalenko's second movie Unclenching the Fists was filmed in North Ossetia in only 25 days. The movie took the main prize at the Cannes Film Festival in Un Certain Regard in 2021 and received a distribution offer by Mubi streaming service.

Kovalenko and fellow dissident filmmaker Kantemir Balagov were chosen as Telluride Film Festival guest directors in September 2022.

In November 2022, Kovalenko announced her new project under a working title 'Children of hope'. The script is co-authored with Russian writer Marina Stepnova, Alexander Rodnyanskiy's studio AR Content will produce the project.
