= Semyon Strugachyov =

Russian actor

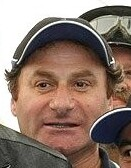
- Born: Semyon Mikhailovich Strugachyov; December 10, 1957 (age 68); Smidovich, Smidovichsky District, Jewish Autonomous Oblast, RSFSR, Soviet Union
- Occupation: actor
- Years active: 1979—present

Semyon Mikhailovich Strugachyov (Russian: Семён Миха́йлович Стругачёв; born December 10, 1957) is a Soviet and Russian film and stage actor, People's Artist of Russia (2008).

== Biography ==
Semyon Strugachyov was born on December 10, 1957, in the village of Smidovich, Smidovichsky District, Jewish Autonomous Region. Father Misha Strugashvili is half Georgian, half Mountain Jew.

In 1979, he graduated from the acting department of the Far Eastern Pedagogical Institute of Arts in Vladivostok. He also worked in the Primorsky Regional Drama Theater (Vladivostok), Gorky Academic Theater, Kuibyshev Drama Theater. In 1988 he started acting at the Saint Petersburg Lensoviet Theatre.

He made his debut in cinema in 1991. All-Russian fame to Strugachyov was brought by Aleksandr Rogozhkin’s comedy Peculiarities of the National Hunt (1995). Subsequently, starred in all sequels of this film.

== Selected filmography ==
- Austrian Field (1991) as blind painter
- Peculiarities of the National Hunt (1995) as Lev Soloveichik
- Operation Happy New Year (1996) as Lev Soloveichik
- Peculiarities of the National Fishing (1998) as Lev Soloveichik
- Peculiarities of the National Hunt in Winter Season (2000) as Lev Soloveichik
- Peculiarities of National Politics (2003) as Lev Soloveichik
- Deadly Force (2004-2006) as Semyon Chernyga, forensic expert
- The Fall of the Empire (2005) as Fleishman
- The Master and Margarita (2005) as Matthew the Apostle
- Cinderella (2012) as Mikhail Levitsky
- Sherlock Holmes (2013) as Charles Gauthier, Ambassador of France
- Kidnapping, Caucasian Style! (2014) as the Coward
- Catherine the Great (2015) as Lestocq

== Awards and honours ==
- Honored Artist of the Russian Federation (1999)
- People's Artist of the Russian Federation (2008)
- Medal of the Order For Merit to the Fatherland II class Civilian Division (2018)
