= Era Ziganshina =

Russian actress

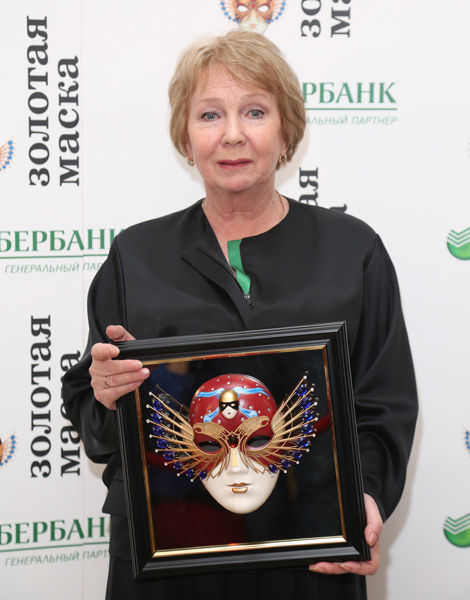
- Ziganshina at the 2014 Golden Mask Awards
- Born: Era Garafovna Ziganshina; 1 February 1944 (age 82); Kazan, Tatar ASSR, Soviet Union
- Education: Tovstonogov Bolshoi Drama Theater
- Occupation: Actress
- Years active: 1965–present
- Awards: People's Artist of Russia (2005); Golden Mask Award (2014)

Era Garafovna Ziganshina (Russian: Э́ра Гара́фовна Зига́ншина; Tatar: Эра Гарәф кызы Җиһаншина, romanized: Era Garäf qızı Cihanşina; born February 1, 1944) is a Soviet and Russian film and stage actress, People's Artist of Russia (2005).

== Biography ==
Ziganshina was born in Kazan, Soviet Union (now in Tatarstan, Russia). She studied at drama school at the Tovstonogov Bolshoi Drama Theater in Leningrad (now Saint Petersburg). From 1965 to 1976 he worked at the Baltic House Festival Theatre (with a break in 1970 he worked at the Russian drama theater in Chișinău).

== Filmography ==
- 1967 The Snow Queen (Russian: Снежная королева)
- 1976 Heavenly Swallows (Russian: Небесные ласточки)
- 1982 Through the Fire (Russian: Сквозь огонь)
- 1983 Magistral (Russian: Магистраль)
- 1991 The Man Who Doesn't Return (Russian: Невозвращенец)
- 1994 The Year of the Dog (Russian: Год собаки)
- 1998 Marigolds in Flower (Russian: Цветы календулы)
- 2000 Bandit Petersburg (Russian: Бандитский Петербург)
- 2000 Streets of Broken Lights (Russian: Улицы разбитых фонарей)
- 2005 The Fall of the Empire (Russian: Гибель империи)
- 2007 Antonina Turned Around (Russian: Антонина обернулась)
- 2011 Sky Court (Russian: Небесный суд)
