= Ville Haapasalo =

Finnish stage and film actor

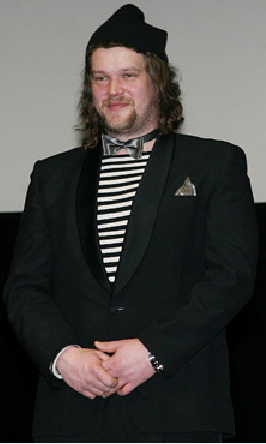
- Haapasalo in 2010
- Born: Ville Juhana Haapasalo; 28 February 1972 (age 54); Hollola, Finland
- Occupations: Actor, television
- Years active: 1995–present
- Spouses: Saara Hedlund (m. 1995; div. 2026); Tina Barkalaya (m. 2026)
- Children: 3
- Awards: (2003)

Ville Juhana Haapasalo (born 28 February 1972) is a Finnish stage and film actor who has worked in Finland and Russia. His acting career started in 1995, after he finished his studies in St. Petersburg. In 2003, he was honored with the State Prize of the Russian Federation for his role of Veikko in the film The Cuckoo directed by Aleksandr Rogozhkin.

== Education ==
Haapasalo was educated in St. Petersburg at the Academy of Performing Arts of the Saint Petersburg State Theatre Arts Academy. He knew no Russian when he began studying. He studied there from 1991 to 1995. It was a difficult period in the 1990s Russia; he was mugged nine times in 1992, tried to commit suicide three times, and because of his financial problems he worked as a driver for the mafia.

== Career ==
Haapasalo's career got a huge lift immediately after his graduation for his appearance in 1995 in a Russian comedy Peculiarities of the National Hunt. But this sudden fame turned out to be stressful for him and he temporarily returned to Finland to work as a truck driver. In 2002, he won the Best Actor award at the 24th Moscow International Film Festival, for his role in the Russian-made film The Cuckoo.

Although his fame comes mostly from film, he also writes for the screen, acts in theaters, and does TV cinema. He also appeared in Finland's Ministry of Transport and Communications' 1998 campaign National Features of Driving instructing Russians on Finnish road rules. He is more widely recognized in Russia than in his country of origin Finland. He has hosted and starred in a number of travel shows on Finnish and Russian TV.

He appeared in the first season of ice show contest Ice Age.

After the 2022 Russian invasion of Ukraine, Haapasalo strongly condemned the war, effectively ending his multi-decade acting and media career in Russia. He also shut down his Soviet-themed restaurant in Helsinki. Haapasalo was labelled a traitor by Russian government-aligned media.

== Personal life ==
Haapasalo was born in Hollola, Finland. He speaks four languages fluently: Finnish, Russian, Swedish, and English. His hobbies include playing trombone, ice-hockey, skiing, and skating.

In 2016, Haapasalo opened a Georgian restaurant called Purpur in Helsinki.

=== Family ===
Haapasalo married Saara Hedlund in 1995. They divorced in 2026. Haapasalo and Hedlund have two children.

Haapasalo also has a son (born 2009) with Russian director Tina Barkalaya, who is of Georgian descent. In 2026, Haapasalo moved to Georgia and married Barkalaya.

== Filmography ==
Year	Title of film / TV series	Title in English	Title in other languages	Role
1995	Особенности национальной охоты	Peculiarities of the National Hunt	Особенности национальной охоты (Russian); Metsästyksen kansallisia erikoisuuksia (Finnish)	Raivo
1996	Операция С новым годом (ТВ)	Operation Happy New Year (TV)	Russian	second Killer
1998	Elämän suola (TV-Episode: "Yksi lensi yli käenpesän")	Salt of life (TV series)	Finnish	Timppa
1998	Особенности национальной рыбалки	Peculiarities of the National Fishing	Особенности национальной рыбалки (Russian); Kalastuksen kansallisia erikoisuuksia (Finnish)	Raivo
1998	Samaa Sukua, eri Maata (TV)	The same family, different country (TV series)	Finnish	Jari Jokinen
1999	Lapin kullan kimallus	Lapin kullan kimallus	The glitter of Lappish gold (Finnish)	Frans Björklund
2000	Pakkaus (short)	The packaging	Finnish; Packningen (Swedish)	Jaakko
2000: 2005	Убойная сила (сериал); Uboynaya Sila (TV series)	Destructive force (TV series)	Russian	episode Kredit Doveriya
2001	Maamiehen Päiväkirja (short)	Maamiehen diary	Finnish	Maamies
2002	One Christmas morning (short film)	One Christmas Morning	Sweden; Одно рождественское утро (Russian)	
2002	Minä en ole kone (short film)	I'm not a machine	Finnish	
2002	Кукушка; Kukushka	The Cuckoo	Russian; Käki (Finnish)	Veikko
2003	Pietarin Myytti	Saint Petersburg myth (Mini-series)	Finnish	Various
2003	Perjantai	Wednesday (TV)	Finnish	
2003	Letters from Karelia	Letters From Karelia	Canadian	Aate Pitkänen
2003	Кукушкино гнездо (ТВ); Kukushkino gnezdo	Cuckoo's Nest (TV)	Russian; Käen pesä/Käk - tähden synty (Finnish)	
2003	Vieraalla maalla	in a strange land	Finnish	Tuomas Linna/Omar Ghaala
2004	Диверсант (мини-сериал); Diversant	The Saboteur (TV Miniseries)	Russian	Wilhelm
2004	Королева бензоколонки 2 (ТВ); Koroleva benzokolonki 2	Queen of the petrol station 2 (TV)	Russian; Королева бензоколонки 2 (Ukrainian)	Ruslan
2005	Yövuoro	Night Shift (TV series)	Finnish	Turvapäällikkö Jari Viirilä
2005	Tahdon Asia (TV-episode #1.6)	Matters of the Will (TV series)	Finnish	(voice)
2005	Гибель империи (сериал); Gibel Imperii	The Fall of the Empire (TV mini-series)	Russian	Tarvilainen
2005	КГБ в смокинге (сериал); KGB v smokinge	The KGB in a Tuxedo (TV series)	Russian	Eugene
2005	Domoi - Kotiinpaluu	Domoi - Homecoming	Finnish; Домой (Russian)	The Warrior
2006	Priroda i zdorovie "Luonto ja terveys" (TV)	Nature and Health (TV)	Finnish; Природа и здоровье (Russian)	Kostya
2006	Suden Arvoitus	Mystery of the Wolf	Finnish; Vargens Hemlighet (Swedish)	Paulus Morgam
2007	Дочь генерала – Татьяна (мини-сериал); Doch generala	Daughter of General - Tatiana (Mini-series)	Russian	
2007	Чужие тайны (сериал); Chuzhie tayny	Other people's secrets (TV series)	Russian	Jeff
2007	Ирония Судьбы: Продолжение; Ironiya sud’by. Prodolzheniye	The Irony of Fate 2	Russian; Kohtalon ironiaa – jatkoa (Finnish); Số phận trớ trêu. Phần tiếp theo (Vietnamese)	Drunken Finn
2008	Lemmenleikit	Make love to (TV Series)	Finnish	Samuli Harjanne
2008	Luola (short film)	Cave	Finnish	Ilari's father
2009	Весельчаки; Veselchaki	Jolly Fellows	Russian; Joyeux compères (French)	Roza
2009	Любовь в большом городе Ljubov v bolšom gorode	Love in the Big City	Russian; Кохання у великому місті (Ukrainian)	Olli (Sauna)
2009	Царь	Tsar	Russian	Andrey Staden
2010	Venäjän halki 30 päivässä (Documentary)	Across Russia in 30 Days		Himself
2010	Любовь в большом городе 2 Ljubov v bolšom gorode 2	Love in the Big City 2	Russian; Кохання у великому місті 2 (Ukrainian)	Olli (Sauna)
2011	Tunarit (Short)	The Duffers	Finnish	
2011	Sapuskaa - harashoo! (TV Series)			Himself
2011	Alamaailma-trilogia	Underworld Trilogy	Finnish	Artur Deminoff
2011	Беременный; Beremennyy	The Pregnant	Russian	Rezhisser
2012	Самоубийцы; Samoubiytsy	Suicides	Russian	Finn
2012	Silkkitie 30 päivässä (Documentary)	30 Days on the Silk Road	Finnish	Himself
2012	Golfa straume zem ledus kalna	Gulf Stream Under the Iceberg	Latvian; Гольфстрим под айсбергом (Russian)	Theophilius
2013	Rölli ja kultainen avain	Rolli, and the secret of all time	Finnish; Ролли и золотой ключик (Russian)	
2013	Три мушкетера	The Three Musketeers	Russian	Farmer
2013	Suomensukuiset 30 päivässä (Documentary)	Russian Tribes in 30 Days	Finnish	Himself
2014	Любовь в большом городе 3 Ljubov v bolšom gorode 3	Love in the Big City 3	Russian; Кохання у великому місті 3 (Ukrainian); Каханне ў вялікім горадзе 3 (Belarusian)	Olli (Sauna)
2014	Папа напрокат (мини-сериал)	Dad for hire (Mini-series)	Russian	Philip
2014	Jäämeri 30 päivässä (Documentary)	Arctic Ocean in 30 Days	Finnish	Himself
2015	Kaukasia 30 päivässä (Documentary)	Caucasia in 30 Days	Finnish	Himself
2016	Volga 30 päivässä (Documentary)	Volga in 30 Days	Finnish	Himself
2016	Tappajan näköinen mies	The man who looks like a killer	Finnish	Aleksei Kornostajev
2016	Rölli ja kaikkien aikojen salaisuus	Rolli, and the secret of all time	Finnish	Seppä
2017	Altai 30 päivässä (Documentary)	Altai in 30 Days	Finnish	Himself
2018	Haapasalon Suomi (Documentary)	Haapasalo's Finland	Finnish	Himself
2018	Hölmö nuori sydän	Stupid Young Heart	Finnish	Janne
2019–	Muumilaakso	Moominvalley	Finnish	Moominpappa

=== Writer ===
- Perjantai (2003) (TV)
- Luonto ja terveys (2006) (TV)
