= Peculiarities of the Russian Bath =

- Russian: Особенности русской бани
- Directed by: Alexey Rudakov
- Written by: Alexey Rudakov
- Produced by: Mikhail Babakhanov; Vladimir Karev
- Starring: Viktor Bychkov; Alexander Pyatkov; Oksana Stashenko; Vyacheslav Kulakov; Lyubov Tikhomirova
- Cinematography: Aleksey Molchanov
- Music by: Dmitry Paskevich
- Production company: KV Film
- Release date: September 27, 1999
- Running time: 72 min.
- Country: Russia
- Language: Russian

Peculiarities of the Russian Bath (Russian: Особенности русской бани, romanized: Osobennosti russkoy bani) is a 1999 Russian erotic film directed by Aleksey Rudakov. It was filmed in the wake of the success of Alexander Rogozhkin’s film Peculiarities of the National Hunt and subsequent sequels.

The film is included in the list of films banned for open screening in the Republic of Belarus.

== Plot ==
In the center of the plot of the film are three erotic tales told by the attendant Mitrich to a tipsy company who came to take a steam bath in a Russian bath.

== Cast ==
- Viktor Bychkov as Mitrich
- Alexander Pyatkov as carpenter
- Oksana Stashenko as mistress
- Vyacheslav Kulakov as godparent
- Lyubov Tikhomirova as bath attendant
- Mikhail Kotov as German officer
- Lyubov Rusakova as blonde

== Critical response ==
Film critic Sergey Kudryavtsev twice included the film in his anti-ratings, including as the worst film in a quarter of a century, assigning him 1 point out of 10 possible.

Lyubov Arkus notes the successful choice of Viktor Bychkov for the lead role.
