= American Bet =

- Russian: Американка
- Directed by: Dmitry Meskhiev
- Written by: Yuriy Korotkov
- Produced by: Natalya Smirnova; Elena Yatsura
- Starring: Natalya Danilova; Nina Usatova; Viktor Bychkov; Andrey Krasko; Aleksandr Polovtsev
- Cinematography: Sergey Machilskiy
- Release date: 1997
- Country: Russia
- Language: Russian

American Bet (Russian: Американка) is a 1997 Russian romance film directed by Dmitry Meskhiev. based on a novel by Yuri Korotkov (Russian novelist and scenario writer, not related in any way to ex-KGB agent and defected dissident Yuri Krotkov, "Korotkov" and "Krotkov" are not same surnames despite looking or sounding similar).

== Plot ==
The action takes place in 1977 (preparations are underway for the 60th anniversary of Soviet power) in a provincial Soviet town (the film was shot in Pskov ). High school students, having grown Beatles ' patles and inserted multi-colored wedges into plaid trousers are entering adulthood. The school is full of bans and ideological brainwashing. And on the street - complete freedom: petty theft, bloody fights on dance floors with guys from neighboring areas and first love. The main character, ninth-grader Lyoshka Kolyadko, is in love with Tanka, the ex-girlfriend of his brother, who died in an accident. During the film, Kolyadko's dead brother appears several times, either saving him from the pursuing punks from a neighboring village, or escorting the train. He agrees with her on the "American" - a bet under which the loser is obliged to fulfill any desire of the winner. The film ends with Lesha's departure to another city for training. He swears that he will make discoveries, come back in 10 years, marry Tanya, they will have three children. All this is reported to have come true.

== Cast ==
- Natalya Danilova as Tanya
- Nina Usatova as Matilda
- Viktor Bychkov as Tretyakov
- Andrey Krasko
- Aleksandr Polovtsev as Yasha
- Oleg Fyodorov as Kisel
- Sergey Vasilev as Kolyadko
- Yury Kuznetsov as Uncle Misha
- Vasilisa Strelnikova as Nadya
- Oksana Bazilevich as Antonina

== Creation ==
The film was shot in Pskov, the main scenes were filmed in the Zapskovye region. As director Dmitry Meskhiev noted: “From the first to the last frame, the film will be filmed in Pskov. Not only "nature", but also actions inside the premises, in the apartment. Your city has its own atmosphere, its own spirit. The greatest joy I would call a meeting with the Pskov artist Alexander Stroylo. Now I can't even imagine how we would work without him. After reading the script, he offered us almost all the filming locations, and we overwhelmingly agreed with him. Many thanks to the city administration for their help in organizing and conducting filming. I didn't expect that. Honestly. We were especially afraid for some "difficult objects" of shooting, for example, on the railway. But all problems were solved quickly, like in a fairy tale”.

The author of the script, Yuri Korotkov, recalls the filming as follows: “Severe reality intervened in the filming process. It was a pre-crisis year: there was not enough money to such an extent that the actors came to shoot at their own expense, the group worked almost for free, and the question arose - either close the picture or shoot cheaply. As a result, I was called to Pskov with a request to remove everything from the script that required money”
