= Deadly Force (TV series) =

- Genre: Crime
- Written by: Andrei Kivinov; Oleg Dudintsev
- Directed by: Alexander Rogozhkin; Viktor Buturlin; Evgeniy Tatarskiy
- Starring: Konstantin Khabensky; Andrey Fedortsov; Sergey Koshonin; Eugene Ganelin; Evgeny Leonov-Gladyshev
- Country of origin: Russia
- Original language: Russian
- No. of seasons: 6
- No. of episodes: 57

Production
- Producers: Anatoliy Maksimov; Konstantin Ernst; Sergei Melkumov
- Running time: 50 minutes

Original release
- Network: Channel One Russia; REN TV
- Release: March 13, 2000 – January 5, 2006

Related
- Streets of Broken Lights

Deadly Force (Russian: Убойная сила, romanized: Uboinaya sila) is a Russian detective TV series, which first appeared on television in 2000. In total from 2000 to 2005 there were 6 seasons (57 episodes).

It was released by Channel One Russia simultaneously as a spin-off series from Streets of Broken Lights and as its direct competitor.

One of the defining characteristics of the series are its humorous pop-culture references, pertaining to Russian and international film, TV and literature.

== Plot ==
The action begins in 1999 in St. Petersburg. In the center of the plot are operatives of the district militsiya department and the homicide department of the command post in St. Petersburg. The first season of the series included a narrative tied to a single story (9 episodes). In the following seasons, as a rule, each series is an independent criminal detective story.

The main characters of the series are Igor Plakhov and Vasily Rogov – police officers, their service is associated with the investigation of domestic crimes and the fight against organized crime. Working for a minuscule salary and risking their lives, the heroes fulfill their duty. In the first season, the main characters are employees of the district police department. In the department, Anatoly Dukalis is transferred to Plakhov and Rogov for additional support, who in turn does not lose touch with his old acquaintances, heroes of the series The Streets of Broken Lights. Starting from the second season, the employees of the district department Plakhov, Rogov and Shishkin are transferred to the head-office, under the direct start of the general (San Sanych). Here their ways diverge from the cops (Dukalis, Volkov, Larin and Solovets). Their service makes them go to various places: (Los Angeles, Chechnya, Cote d'Azur, South Africa) and everywhere they show high professionalism, resourcefulness and sense of humor, allowing with honor to come out of the most difficult tests.

== Cast ==
- Konstantin Khabensky as senior lieutenant (from the second season – captain) Igor Sergeevich Plakhov (seasons 1–6)
- Andrei Fedortsov as lieutenant (from the second season – senior lieutenant) Vasily Ivanovich Rogov (seasons 1–6)
- Sergey Selin as captain Anatoly Valentinovich Dukalis (season 1)
- Alexey Nilov as captain Andrei Vasilyevich Larin (season 1)
- Alexander Polovtsev as Major Oleg Georgievich Solovets (season 1)
- Mikhail Trukhin as Senior Lieutenant Vyacheslav Yurievich Volkov (season 1)
- Yevgeny Leonov-Gladyshev as major (from the 4th season – lieutenant-colonel) Anatoly Pavlovich Shishkin (seasons 1–5)
- Victor Kostetskiy as Major-General Alexander Aleksandrovich Maksimov (San Sanych) (seasons 1–6)
- Sergei Kosonin as Major Maxim Pavlovich Virigin (seasons 2–6)
- Yevgeny Ganelin as Major Georgiy Maksimovich Lyubimov (seasons 2–6)
- Alexander Tyutyrumov as Lieutenant-Colonel Sergei Arkadievich Egorov (seasons 2–6)
- Yuri Galtsev as Yuri, forensic expert (seasons 1–2)
- Semyon Strugachyov as Captain Semyon Chernyga, forensic expert (seasons 2–6)
- Viktor Soloviev as captain (from the 5th series of the 2nd season – major) Grigory Streltsov (seasons 2–6)
- Viktor Bychkov as Albert Pomerantsev, informant (seasons 1–6)
- Mikhail Porechenkov as Captain Nikita Andreevich Uvarov, employee of the police of morals (season 6)
- Sergei Murzin as Boris Kravchenko, friend of Plakhov (seasons 1–4)
- Georgy Shtil as Fedor Ilich Petrov, father-in-law of Rogov (seasons 1–6)
- Olga Kalmykova as Rogov's mother-in-law (seasons 1–6)
- Herman Orlov as Ivan Fedorovich Izyumov, investigator of the prosecutor's office (seasons 1, 3–4)
- Nikolai Lavrov as Member of the Legislative Assembly Arkady Bogolepov (season 1)
- Igor Lifanov as Sergey Anokhin, nicknamed Fan (season 1)
- Stanislav Sadalsky as prosecutor Anatoly Lvovich (seasons 1, 3)
- Julia Rudina as Alena, Plakhov's girlfriend (seasons 2–3)

== Development ==
In 1998, Streets of Broken Lights, the low-budget production of TNT channel with unknown actors in the lead roles, unexpectedly earned high ratings and audience popularity. However, in 1999, after disagreements between the leadership of the TNT channel and the author of the script, Andrei Kivinov, the latter left for the rival – Channel One, where he proposed the idea of a TV series with a similar script based on his works. The co-author of the script was Andrei's former colleague at the Kirov District Department of Internal Affairs of Leningrad.

== Release ==
In the pilot series of the project, actors who played in the series The Streets of Broken Lights were invited: Selin, Nilov, Trukhin and Polovtsev. However, then the action was completely transferred to the new heroes played by Khabensky and Fedortsov. The premiere of the series took place on March 13, 2000 on Channel One. In the premiere year, an interesting situation developed at the network; two popular series, The Streets of Broken Lights and Deadly Force, were at the same time on two competing channels NTV and Channel One with the same main characters. Moreover, according to experts of the agency "TNS Gallup Media", the rating of the premiere episodes of Deadly Force was higher.

== On-set injuries ==
During the filming of four episodes set in the Chechen war, seventeen injuries happened on-set. Some of the accidents which required surgical care included a stuntman suffering a clavicle fracture and Khabensky being struck by a sharp stone in his temple.

== Awards ==
Winner of the TEFI award in 2000 for the Best TV series.
