= The Shadow (2017 film) =

- Directed by: Dmitriy Svetozarov
- Screenplay by: Arkadiy Krasilshchikov
- Produced by: Ekaterina Borisova; Andrey Sigle; Dmitriy Svetozarov
- Starring: Mikhail Porechenkov; Yuri Stoyanov; Pavel Chernyavskiy; Pyotr Logachev; Evgeniy Kataev; Sergey Vasilev
- Cinematography: Gleb Klimov
- Music by: Andrey Sigle
- Production companies: Kinokompaniya "Studiya ASDS"; Proline Film; Studio ACDC
- Release date: 6 July 2017
- Country: Russia
- Language: Russian

The Shadow is a Russian drama film directed by Dmitriy Svetozarov. It stars Mikhail Porechenkov and Yuri Stoyanov. It was released on 6 July 2017.

== Plot ==
A man falls in love with a photo of a long-dead beautiful actress of silent cinema.

== Cast ==
- Mikhail Porechenkov as Boris Gordin
- Yuri Stoyanov as Panov
- Pavel Chernyavskiy as Dvornik / Frolov
- Pyotr Logachev as Izyumov
- Yuri Galtsev as Zhora
- Evgeniy Kataev as Pronin
- Sergey Vasilev
- Varvara Shcherbakova as Veronika
- Rudolf Furmanov as Uncle Senya

== Production ==
FIlming took place in Saint Petersburg.

== Release and reception ==
The film's premiere took place in a subway station. A review on Afisha was critical of the portrayal of the main character. The film was described as a parable.
