= The Storm Gate =

2006 Russian war drama

- Грозовые ворота
- Genre: War drama
- Based on: The Company Goes to Heaven by Aleksandr Tamonikov
- Written by: Aleksandr Buravskiy; Aleksandr Tamonikov; Anatoliy Usov
- Directed by: Andrei Malyukov
- Starring: Mikhail Porechenkov; Vyacheslav Razbegaev; Anatoly Pashinin; Andrey Krasko; Elizaveta Boyarskaya; Mikhail Efremov
- Composer: Ivan Burlyayev
- Country of origin: Russia
- Original language: Russian
- No. of seasons: 1
- No. of episodes: 4

Production
- Producers: Konstantin Ernst; Anatoly Maksimov
- Cinematography: Vladimir Sporyshkov
- Running time: 208 minutes

Original release
- Network: Channel One
- Release: 13 February – 16 February 2006

The Storm Gate (Russian: Грозовые ворота, translit. Grozove vorota) is a 2006 Russian war drama miniseries directed by Andrey Malyukov. The film is a dramatization of the real-life Battle for Height 776 which was fought for control of the Argun River gorge during the Second Chechen War. The film is based off the novel The Company Goes to Heaven by Russian author Aleksandr Tamonikov. The series original title was planned to be "The 6th Company" (Russian: 6 рота), however, due to the release of Fyodor Bondarchuk's 2005 film 9th Company (Russian: 9 рота), the series name was changed to "The Storm Gate".

== Plot ==
The film follows Senior Lieutenant Alexander Doronin (Anatoly Pashinin) and his rifle company of the 74th Separate Guards Motor Rifle Brigade during the Second Chechen War. Doronin's company is assisted by a detachment of the Spetsnaz GRU special forces led by Major Egorov (Mikhail Porechenkov) who are tasked with defending a mountain pass codenamed "The Storm Gate" against a combined militant force of the Caucasian Mujahadeen and Arab volunteers of the Mujahideen in Chechnya. The unit is assisted by Shah (Vyacheslav Razbegayev), a guide, informant, and ex-Chechen rebel whose family was assassinated by members of the Chechen Mujahideen.

== Cast ==
- Mikhail Porechenkov - Major Egorov, commander of Spetsnaz GRU forces
- Vyacheslav Razbegayev - Shah, an ex-Chechen soldier and informant
- Anatoly Pashinin - Senior Lieutenant Alexander Doronin
- Andrey Krasko - Colonel Galkin
- Ivan Zhidkov - Private Konstantin "Kostya" Vetrov
- Marina Mogilevskaya - Private Vetrov's mother
- Elizaveta Boyarskaya - Alexandra, Doronin's girlfriend
- Mikhail Efremov - Captain Lanevsky, Doronin's company commander

== Filming ==
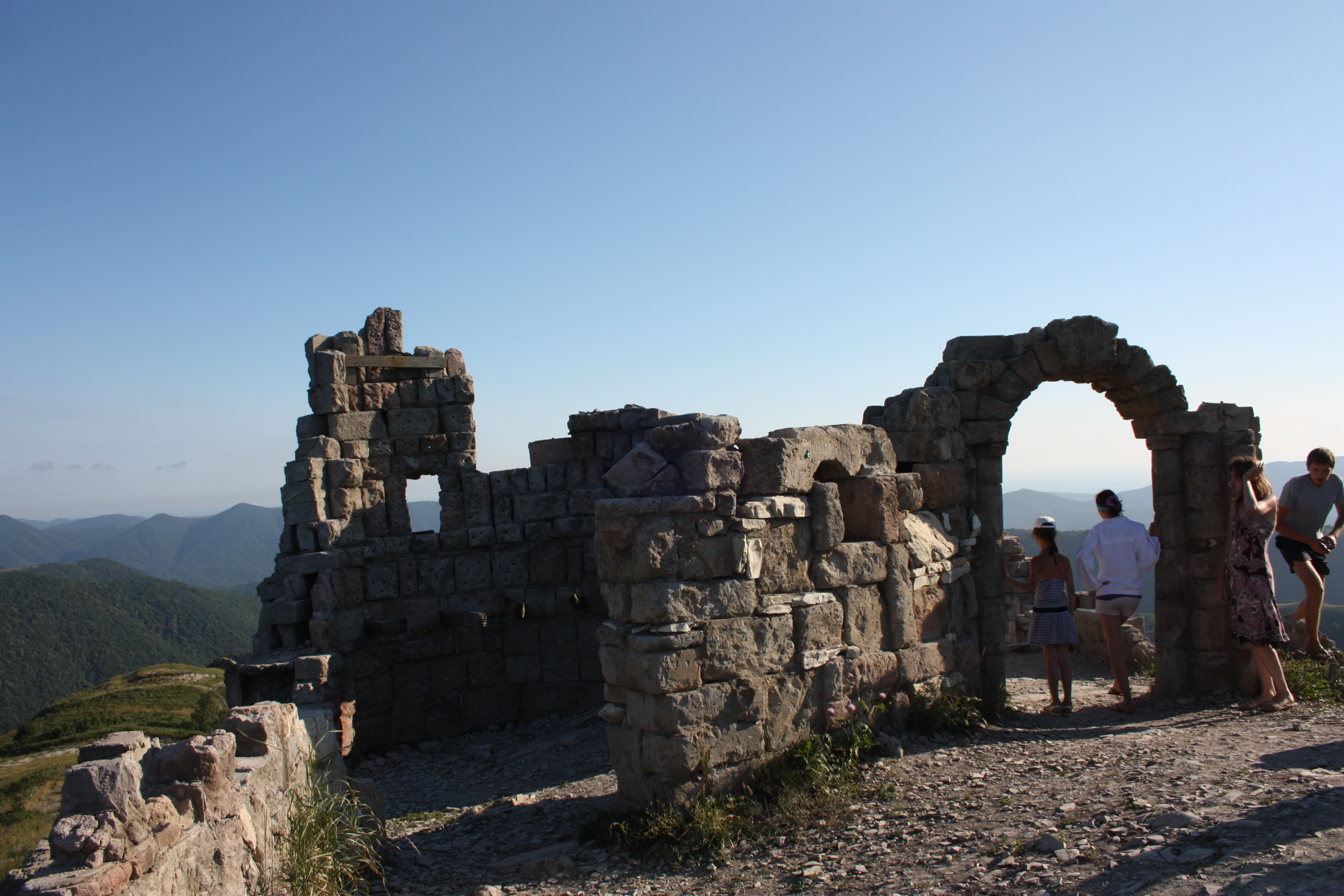
Filming location for the hilltop ruins near Gelendzhik

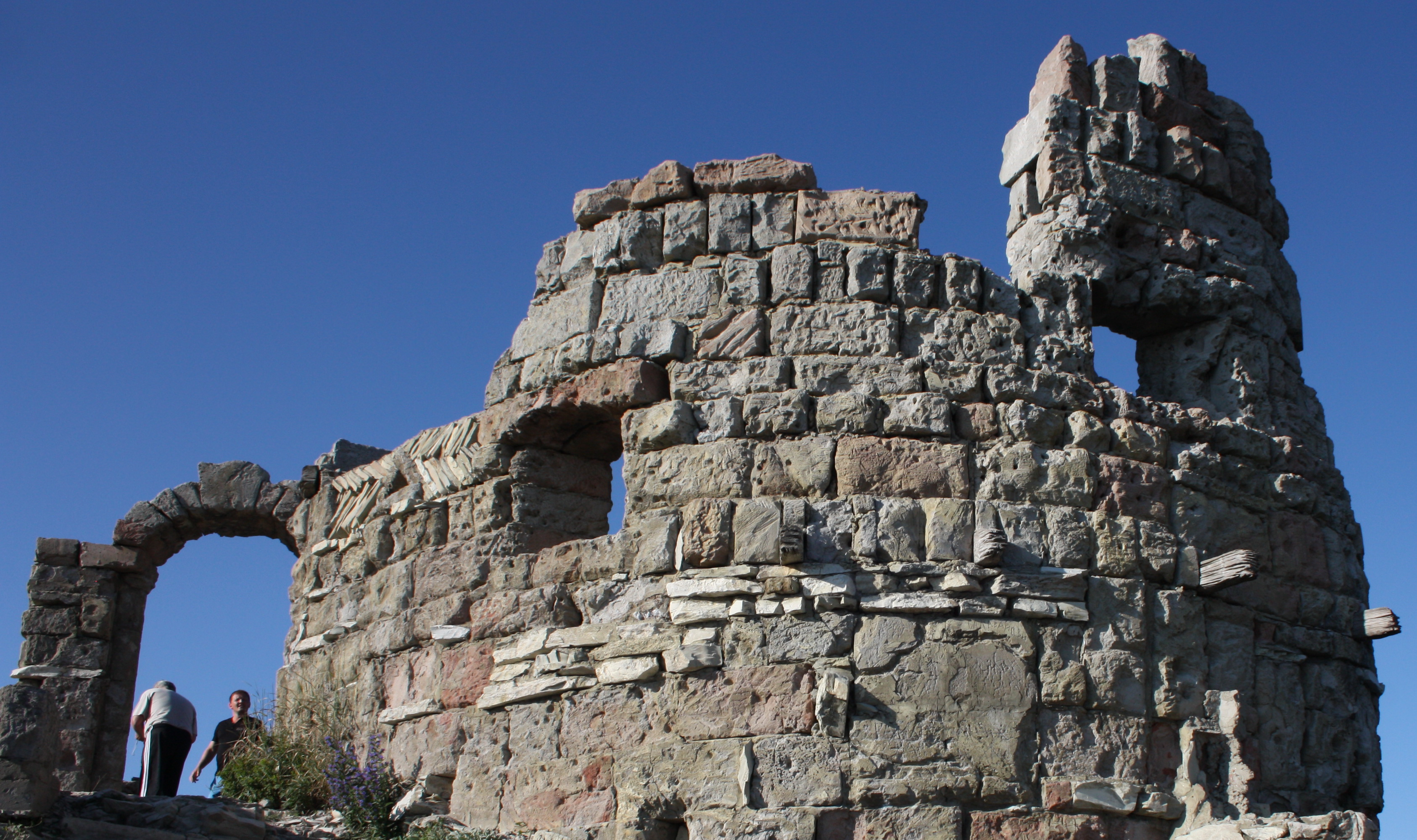
Another shot of the prop fortress in Gelendzhik

Filming for the miniseries primarily took place in Pskov where 32 of the 84 paratroopers from the 6th Company of the 104th Guards Air Assault Regiment who died in battle were from. Other filming locations include Gelendzhik where local residents were provided as extras, as well as Kabardinka and Divnomorskoye. The film set near Gelendzhik later became a popular tourist attraction. The hilltop scenes were filmed on the border of the Abinsky District near the village of Vozrozhdenie in the Markotkh Range.

In July 2025 the hilltop ruins from the film set were vandalized by unknown assailants. According to Kuban News, a local news outlet in Krasnodar Krai, local community members are actively working to restore the filming location following the vandalization.

== Criticisms and factual errors ==
The film is criticized for its lack of actual military tactics and its embellishing and borderline propaganda levels of dramatization of the actions taken by soldiers who fought in the real-life Battle for Height 776. In reality the defending units of the hill were a combined 90-man task force of Russian Airborne Forces from the 104th Guards Air Assault Regiment and the 76th Guards Air Assault Division. Likewise, 84 of the 90 total soldiers in the company defending Height 776 near Ulus Kert were killed in action with 6 being wounded. In the series 23 soldiers miraculously survive the engagement with help from fire support and are awarded the Order of Courage along with Doronin who is awarded the Hero of the Russian Federation for defending the hill. The battle was a pyrrhic victory for Chechnya with an estimated 400 casualties according to Krasnaya Zvezda.

== Accolades ==
The series was nominated for a Golden Eagle Award for Best TV Film/ Series in 2007, along with a nomination for the State Prize of the Russian Federation in 2007. The film won the "Golden Knight" prize and "Grand Prix" prize for the International Film Festival of Slavic and Orthodox Peoples, as well as the Medal "For Strengthening Military Cooperation" from the Ministry of Defence.

== Similar films ==
- War
- Checkpoint
- Break-through
- The Search
