= Andrei Zibrov =

Russian actor

- Born: Andrei Yurievich Zibrov; 5 July 1973 (age 52); Leningrad, USSR
- Occupation: Actor
- Years active: 1996–present

Andrei Yurievich Zibrov (Russian: Андрей Юрьевич Зибров; 5 July 1973, Leningrad, USSR) is a Russian actor.

He has acted on stage on Lensovet Theatre.

On the night of Friday, April 23 to Saturday, April 24, 2010, at the house No. 11 on Kamennoostrovsky Prospekt, Zibrov was seriously injured when he stood up for his wife, who was molested by hooligans after they left the bar on Kamennoostrovsky Prospekt. When Zibrov tried to protect his wife, one of them shot the actor in the head with a traumatic pistol and hit him in the eye, which had to be replaced with an eye socket after several operations.

== Selected filmography ==
=== Film ===
- Women's Property (1999) as Kostya
- Mechanical Suite (2001) as Viktor
- Peculiarities of the National Hunt in Winter Season (2000) as Igor Rekhnikov
- Peculiarities of National Politics (2003) as Vanya
- Rush Hour (2006) as Vitaliy Obukhov
- He Who Puts Out the Light (2008) as Igor Strakhov

=== TV ===
- Empire under Attack (2000) as Ageev Vladimir Mikhailovich – Topaz
- Streets of Broken Lights (2001–2015) as Knyshev and Igor Gradovikov
- Brezhnev (2005) as Konovalchuk
- The Fall of the Empire (2005) as Pavel Pereverzev
- UE (2006) as Oleg Bannikov
- The White Guard (2012) as Alexander Studzinsky
- Sherlock Holmes (2013) as Charlie Williams
- Trotsky (2017) as Wilhelm II
