= Administrative arrest (Russia) =

Type of incarceration in Russia

In Russia and some other post-Soviet states, administrative detention (Russian: административное задержание) and administrative arrest (Russian: Административный арест) are types of incarceration related to administrative offenses These concepts were inherited from the law of the Soviet Union. Similar legal concepts are used in Belarus and Ukraine

The administrative detention is a short-term restriction of the freedom of a person to secure the consideration of the case and making a decision. The term of administrative detention normally should not exceed 3 hours (article 27.5 of the Code of the Russian Federation on Administrative Offenses), with the exception of the cases related to the violations of state borders and illegal stay in the country (detention up to 48 hours), and cases when a person is expected to be subject to administrative arrest. If an intoxicated person is detained, its detention time starts from the moment the person has sobered up.

If a minor is detained, their parents or legal guardians must be notified.

The administrative arrest is carried out for an administrative offense of grave type, such as malicious defiance of police or military, petty hooliganism, etc.

A number of categories of persons cannot be subject to administrative arrest, such as pregnant women, women with minor dependents, minors, handicapped persons, servicemen of various types, and some others.

In the late Soviet Union a typical administrative jail time was 15 days, and this sentence was routinely applied to Soviet dissidents. Russian writer Andrei Kivinov published a book 15 суток, или можете жаловаться ("15 Days, or You May File a Complaint")
