= Peculiarities of the National Hunt =

- VHS cover
- Directed by: Aleksandr Rogozhkin
- Written by: Aleksandr Rogozhkin
- Produced by: Aleksandr Golutva
- Starring: Aleksei Buldakov; Viktor Bychkov; Semyon Strugachyov; Ville Haapasalo; Sergey Gusinsky; Sergey Russkin; Sergey Kupryanov
- Cinematography: Andrei Zhegalov
- Edited by: Tamara Denisova
- Music by: Vladimir Panchenko
- Distributed by: Lenfilm
- Release date: 1995
- Running time: 94 minutes
- Country: Russia
- Languages: Russian, English, French, Finnish, German

Peculiarities of the National Hunt (Russian: Особенности национальной охоты, romanized: Osobennosti natsionalnoy okhoty) is a 1995 Russian comedy film. It focuses on a young Finnish man named Raivo who dreams to analyze a classical Russian hunt so he engages with a group of real Russian hunters only to discover that his expectations about Russian hunting are very different from reality.

The film was written and directed by Aleksandr Rogozhkin whilst also being distributed by Lenfilm. It is a slapstick humor type of comedy and became a nationwide box office success almost immediately in Russia. It won the Nika Award and Kinotavr awards and was followed by several other sequel films with "Peculiarities" starting off each of their titles.

== Background ==
The act of hunting in Russia has occurred for centuries. It first started with indigenous peoples of Russia. It became more common in the fifteenth and sixteenth centuries with many imperial hunts and hunting clubs taking place across Imperial Russia. The hunts would target a variety of animals, but in many cases they would hunt for wolves and bears.

== Plot ==
The plot follows a young Finnish man named Raivo who is in Russia to study the mannerisms and details of a typical Russian hunt. He is taken in by a former Russian general, Ivolgin, and his band for a hunt in a rural Russian forest. The members of his band are quite eccentric in their own ways and one of them is an exceptionally outrageous woodsman called Kuz’mich.

Coming in with prior misconceptions of how the hunt will go about, picturing an eloquent and royal hunt akin to those of the Eighteenth and Nineteenth Centuries pre-Revolution Russia, but young Raivo quickly learns that this is far from his current reality, instead he finds himself in some rather boozy misadventures that take up much of this group's time.

They have many run-ins with many individuals in the area. Some of the events that transpired during these alcohol-related adventures include having a bear sneak into their banya and terrorize many of the main characters for a bit of time, a Militsiya officer loses his pistol, Lev blowing up a stick of dynamite, missing cows, stolen Police UAZ's, and meetups with the milkmaids. Another side story occurs when Kuz’mich attempts to transport a cow to his relative in a bomber for a bottle of vodka. Stories like these, being stylized as traditional hunting tales, occur constantly throughout a vast portion of the movie and contribute to its slapstick humor elements.

As the movie progresses, it becomes apparent that the hunt is not the main event for these individuals and rather just something they will get around to eventually.

In contrast, Raivo envisions a hunt inspired by 19th century Russia where the hunt is well organized and requires the help of many people, hunting dogs, and horses to achieve a proper hunt. In this imaginary hunt, the characters speak French, are classy, and are after a giant wolf. These scenes serve to juxtapose the ideal hunt from the chaotic flurry that is occurring before Raivo.

But the group does attempt a hunt which is only found with odd events and findings. Some of these events include a pineapple being picked from a hedgerow, Earth being visible in the sky, and a missing cow thought to be shot down during the hunt coming to life and attempting to run away.

As the movie ends, the cast sits around a campfire, and the two worlds of the movie mesh to end the scene and movie.

== Production ==
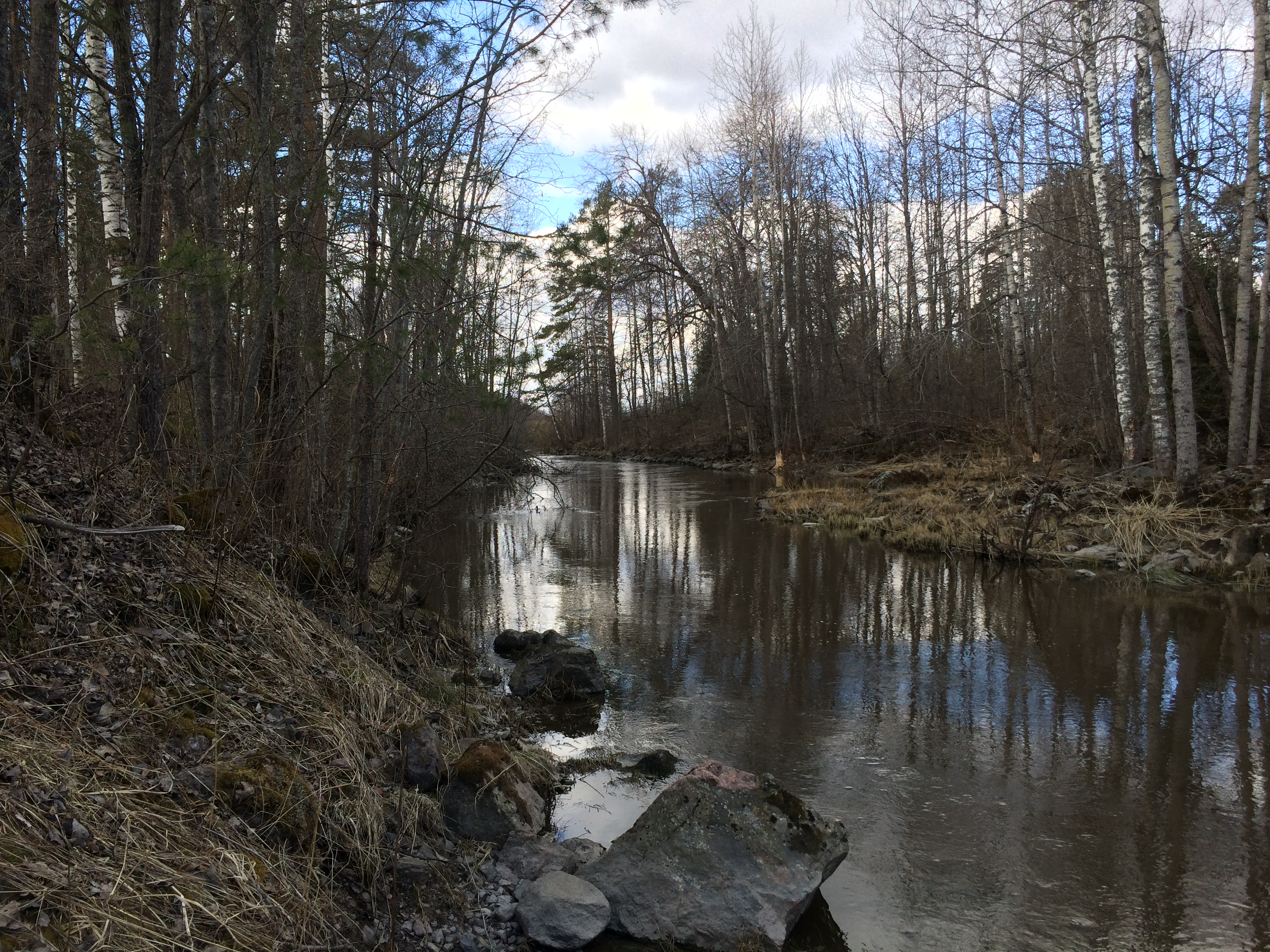
Begunovka river, Protochnoe village, Leningrad Oblast.

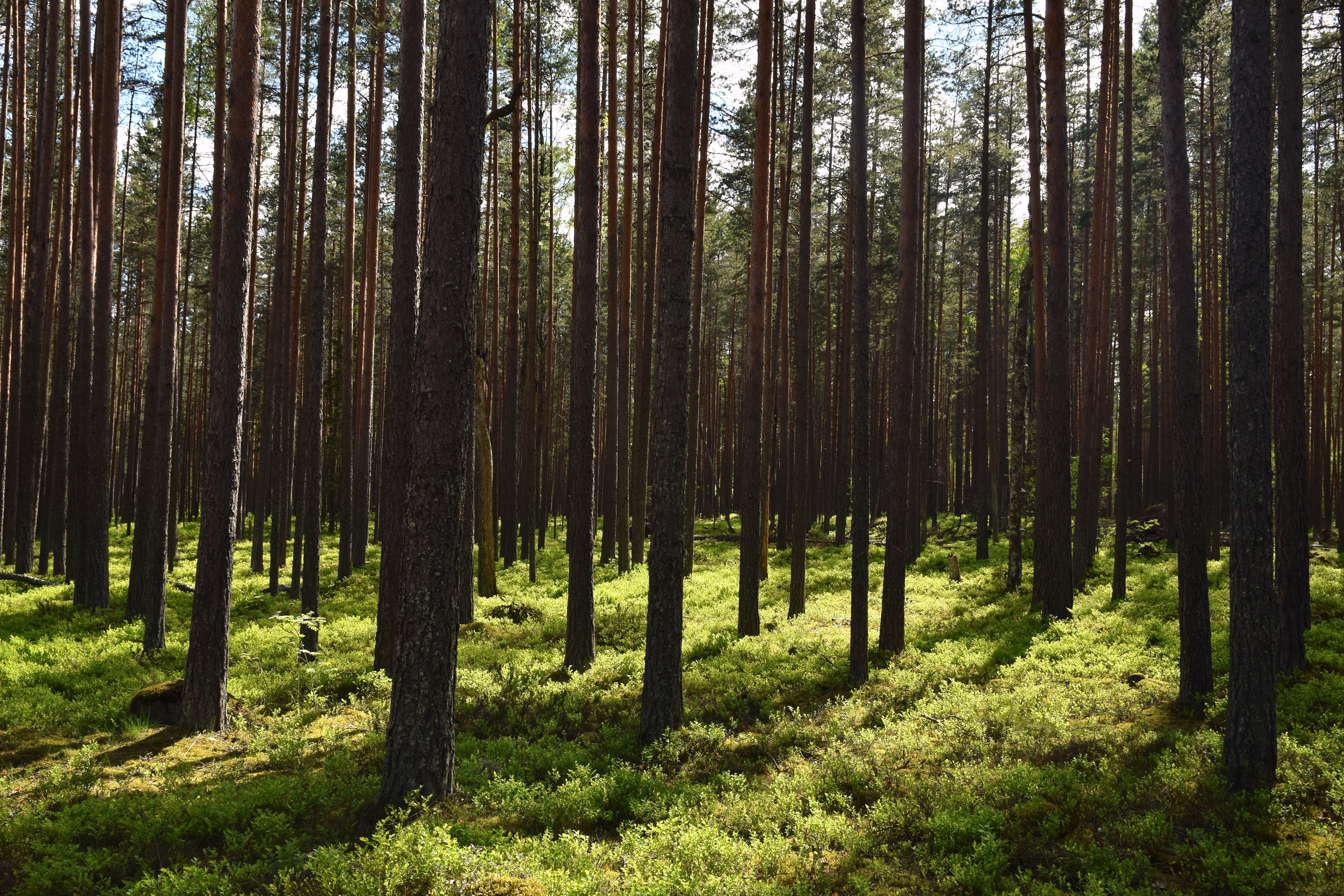
Russian pine forest, Priozersky District

The actors for "... National Hunt", including Kuzmich, were mainly recruited from the director's previous films. The policeman Sergei Semenov was played by Rogozhkin's sound engineer. Ville Haapasalo, who played Raivo, came to the set with his wife Saara (who played one of the milkmaids). Filming took place in Leningrad Oblast and in Karelia in the late summer and autumn of 1994.

Initially, the actors (supported by Rogozhkin) were sure that they were acting not in a comedy, but in an art film. As the creators later admitted, the script gradually turned into a comedy by itself, during filming. Rogozhkin forbade the actors to read newspapers and watch TV so that they "renounce civilization".

Alcohol was absorbed in minimal quantities, mainly in order to keep warm: many scenes, including banya, were filmed in freezing cold conditions. Sergey Russkin (Seryoga) subsequently noted: "If you've been drinking, you think you're playing well. The camera is a deeply sober being. It doesn't like drunks." The only scene shot with non-sober actors was an UAZ ride; this shooting was forced, since the car was lent to the film crew only for one evening.

== Themes ==
The main theme in Peculiarities of the National Hunt is expectations vs. reality. The main character is met with disappointment when his attempt at a "Hunt" goes in a glaringly different direction than its historical predecessors. The film is filled with allusions and adaptations of folk tales about cases that could have happened during a real hunt. A set of Russian stereotypes was ridiculed: banya, vodka, bears. The film is full of paradoxical, anecdotal moments, - such as Zen garden, a hunting policeman in uniform or blackman with a violin in the Russian outback, who intelligently asks for money in pure Russian - which, although impossible in reality, nevertheless, in the context of the film, are perceived as authentic.

Generationalism is an important theme in the movie because it shows how serious the cultural difference in the past was as opposed to the present. The movie goes to show that hallmark cultural events and activities may never go away but may be done or celebrated in a completely different manner with each generation. All the relationships of the characters in a grotesque form repeat the relationships in a certain Russian social group.

In Russia, everyone knows that "hunting" and "fishing" are just euphemisms of a completely chaste bachelor party in the fresh air, an alibi for men, each of whom has something from General Ivolgin and something from the Russian Buddhist Kuz’mich.

— Mikhail Trofimenkov, Kommersant

National characteristics is also a central theme in the film. Through its cinematography and direction, the film emphasizes the tradition of a hunt, offering insight into the differences between the imperial past and the post-imperial present. The two periods are juxtaposed throughout the film, highlighting the contrast.

== Cultural meaning ==
The filmmakers were able to guess the mood of the film so accurately, which will cause a response from the viewer, that the result looked almost like a social order. Aleksandr Rogozhkin had a reputation as an arthouse director. The era of Soviet cinema became a thing of the past, and Rogozhkin presented to the public, in fact, a new tradition of Russian comedy based on situations and techniques understandable to the modern viewer. However, the heroes — a kind of social "masks" (General, Huntsman, Policeman, Foreigner) — allow to draw a clear analogy with the Gaidai film comedy.

After the release of the film, the actors who played the main roles became very popular with the audience. Alexey Buldakov, Viktor Bychkov, Semyon Strugachyov, Ville Haapasalo starred in sequels, became in demand in cinema, TV series and television advertising. Buldakov 's character has gained particular huge popularity for the ability to pronounce brief but capacious toasts.

In fact, I don't consider my film as a comedy. That is, I wanted to make a comedy according to non-comedy laws. I mean the stylistics of the image. Comedy involves active acting in the foreground. The viewer needs to see the actor's facial expressions, his plasticity. And I wanted to make an ordinary, calm movie. A kind of popular science in style. And if we talk about the genre of the film, this is a short course of non-scientific communism.

— Alexander Rogozhkin

In Russia the stable phrase "Peculiarities of national ..." is often used in the press, in literature.

== Reception ==
- IMDB: 7.5
- Russian Film Hub: 7.5
- Kinopoisk: 7.7
- Letterboxd: 3.5/5

Being shot during the mid-1990s, when the number of films produced decreased sharply compared to Soviet times, the film was mostly well received in Russia and was a box office success. It caused a whole wave of imitations and borrowings in Russian cinema.

An hour-and-a-half anecdote about five men who took guns, lots of vodka and a Finnish hunting historian with them, in essence, an attempt to portray a national soul, accompanied by the clink of glasses to melancholic absurdity. <...> Rogozhkin made a claustrophobic comedy about chaos, dating back to the absurdist gallery of former Soviet authorities and at the same time quite claiming a cult reputation today.

— Iskusstvo Kino review, December 1995

Rogozhkin's film was also one of the first and most successful examples of "cinema for the people" (narodnoe kino), following the debates over the sad state of the Russian film industry in the mid-1990s. This might explain the series of prestigious awards Peculiarities received at Russian film festivals, as well as the attention of Russian critics, who were often dismissive of comedies. Peculiarities won the NIKA award of the Russian Academy of Film Art and the Grand Prix at the Kinotavr film festival (notably, the famous satirist Vladimir Voinovich was chairman of the Jury that year). As for Russian audiences, they could not help but fall in love with the film. In the mid-1990s, movie theaters in Russia were in complete disarray, and the film's distribution was primarily on video, finally giving the video pirating industry a native hit from which to profit (Savel'ev 2004). Peculiarities also immediately found a home on Russian television where it often played simultaneously on several channels, especially around the New Year, thus joining such Soviet classics as El'dar Riazanov's Irony of Fate (Ironiia sud'by, 1976) as a feel-good movie par excellence.

— Excerpt from a Kino Kultura review, 2015

Critical reviews in foreign countries were a mixed bag of mostly positive reviews with some being partially negative. This may be attributed to a multitude of different factors, maybe involving differences in culture or difficulties in foreign distribution.

It is slowly becoming clear what the characteristics of Russian hunting are. This satire was Rogosckin's first film to reach a wide audience and has since become a national hit known to young and old. It was compared to Ferreri's "The Big Feast" - only without food. Almost without a plot, the film comes across as a 90-minute drunken anecdote, light and absurd, but not without subversive moments.

— review from Tristesse Deluxe, a German blog

I should like to underline the movie is NOT for abstinents since from a point of view it may be seen as "only about drinking" movie. The story starts when a young Finn comes to experience real Russian hunt. He has had plenty of dreams about it, so they appear randomly in the film. The reality directs him to the absurd reality that only people with delirium tremens may have known - his companions simple refuse to stop their spiritual way to nowhere and if they luckily are sober, everything turns to even greater absurdity (finding the pineapple in Siberia is my favourite one). Note: Watch it subtitled only, because a lot of jokes are based on Russian x Finish lingual dissimilarity, which obviously cannot be understood when dubbed.

— Top user review from IMDB

== Box office release ==
The movie was released in 1995 as a comedy and garnered lots of attention which led to the making of its sequels, Peculiarities of the National Fishing, Peculiarities of the National Hunt in Winter Season, and Peculiarities of National Politics.

== Awards ==
- Karlovy Vary International Film Festival Nominee, "Crystal Globe", Aleksandr Rogozhkin in 1995
- Nika Award, "Best Picture" in 1996
- Nika Award, "Best Director" – Aleksandr Rogozhkin in 1996
- Nika Award, "Best Actor" – Aleksey Buldakov in 1996
- Nika Award Nominee, "Best Screenplay" – Aleksandr Rogozhkin in 1996
- Sochi Open Russian Film Festival, "Grand Prize of the Festival" in 1995

== Cast ==
- Ville Haapasalo as Raivo Haapasalo, a student from Finland
- Aleksey Buldakov as Alexei Mikhailovich Ivolgin (simply Mikhalych), General
- Viktor Bychkov as Kuz’mich the Jager
- Semyon Strugachyov as Lyova Soloveychik, CID officer
- Sergey Russkin as Sergei Olegovich a.k.a Seryoga
- Sergei Guslinsky as Semyonov the Militsia officer
- Sergey Kupriyanov as Zhenya Kachalov
- Igor Dobryakov as Nobleman
- Yuri Makusinsky as Hunter
- Boris Cherdyntsev as Commandant
- Aleksandr Zavyalov as Ensign
- Aleksey Poluyan as Detainee
- Igor Sergeev as Count
- Zoya Buryak as Milkmaid
- Saara Hedlund as Milkmaid
