= Chekist =

Chekist may refer to:

- Member of the Cheka, the first in the succession of Soviet secret police agencies
- Individual associated with Chekism, a term relating to the authoritarianism of Soviet and post-Soviet secret police agencies
- The Chekist, a 1992 Russian film
