= Checkpoint (1998 film) =

- Russian: Блокпост
- Directed by: Aleksandr Rogozhkin
- Written by: Aleksandr Rogozhkin
- Produced by: Konstantin Ernst; Evgeniy Gindilis; Yana Liberis; Anatoliy Maksimov; Sergey Selyanov
- Starring: Aleksandr Ivanov; Andrey Krasko; Aleksey Buldakov; Zoya Buryak; Sergei Guslinsky
- Cinematography: Andrey Zhegalov
- Edited by: Sergei Gudkovsky; Yuliya Rumyantseva
- Music by: Vladislav Panchenko
- Release date: 1998
- Country: Russia
- Language: Russian

Checkpoint (Russian: Блокпост) is a 1998 Russian drama film directed by Aleksandr Rogozhkin.

== Plot ==
The film takes place in 1996 in the North Caucasus, during the First Chechen War. In one mountain aul, a disabled child bangs on a landmine with a hammer, nearly killing a group of Russian soldiers searching the house. They manage to escape, but the mine detonates and kills the child. The villagers of the village gather to the sound of the explosion and surround the detachment of soldiers. In the scuffle, one is disarmed and his weapon is grabbed by a distraught woman from the village.

The woman opens fire on the soldiers but only kills the local police officer, trying to separate the townspeople from the soldiers. One soldier returns fire and shoots the woman in the legs. The platoon is under heavy scrutiny from both their own military superiors and the local government, and to move them away from the angered townspeople, they are sent to relieve a garrison of a local checkpoint. The soldiers spend their days making bets with one another, improvising forms of entertainment and overall trying to not focus on the length of their deployment.

The soldiers are harassed by the constant presence of a Chechen sniper, who lays down fire from a dense forest nearby. They have many near misses, but are never able to spot the sniper. They are likewise harassed by the local townspeople, who vandalize their checkpoint, drop off boxes of excrement, or pass by in large numbers to intimidate the troops.

Occasionally, a local girl visits the checkpoint, offering the soldiers sexual services from her mute sister in exchange for ammunition. The soldiers who take her up on the offer pay her with boiled ammunition, rendering it useless. One soldier, Krysa (Rat), who is under investigation as it was his weapon that was used in the skirmish with the townspeople, is arrested by the local police department with approval from the Russian military. His commanding officer protests, stating that he would be killed if handed over to the locals, but is overruled by his superiors, and Krysa is taken away.

One soldier, Jurist (Lawyer), takes a liking to the girl who visits them, and spends time with her outside his post. She visits more and more frequently, and the two confess their love for one another. Jurist wears a tail attached to his helmet as a talisman, and asks to swap helmets with his squadmate so that he may camoflauge himself to kill the Chechen sniper. His squadmate switches headgear with him, and they see a truck full of locals approaching their checkpoint.

Jurist sees the locals drop something from the truck before it drives away. He investigates and finds Krysa's body wrapped in the skin of a sheep they accidentally killed earlier. Krysa is shaken by this discovery, and enters a state of shock, removing his headgear and simply sitting where he stands.

The perspective switches to that of the sniper that has been hunting the soldiers for the duration of the film. The sniper is revealed to be the girl who comes by to offer up her sister. She mistakenly identifies Jurist as another soldier due to the absence of his talisman, and shoots him dead.

== Cast ==
- Aleksandr Ivanov as Boeing
- Andrey Krasko as Iliych
- Aleksey Buldakov as General
- Zoya Buryak as Detective
- Sergei Guslinsky as Lieutenant Borya
- Roman Romantsov as Bones
- Kirill Ulyanov as Professor
- Ivan Kuzmin as Ash
- Denis Kirillov as Skag
- Egor Tomoshevskiy as Fingers
