= Alexey Nilov =

Russian actor

- Born: Alexey Gennadievich Nilov; 31 January 1964 (age 61); Leningrad, Russian SFSR, Soviet Union
- Occupation: Actor
- Years active: 1987–present
- Relatives: Gennady Nilov (father)
- Awards: Honored Artist of the Russian Federation (2006)

Alexey Gennadievich Nilov (Russian: Алексе́й Генна́дьевич Ни́лов; born 31 January 1964) is a Soviet and Russian film and theater actor. Honored Artist of the Russian Federation (2006).

== Biography ==
Alexey Nilov was born in Leningrad on 31 January 1964, into a creative family.

Nilov is an actor in the second generation. His father, actor Gennady Nilov, the audience remembered one of the main roles in the famous Soviet comedy film Three Plus Two – the role of the chemist Stepan Ivanovich Sundukov and Major Committee for State Security of the Soviet Union – drama Anna Karamazoff.

In 1985, Nilov Jr. graduated from the acting department Russian State Institute of Performing Arts. The specialty film and theater actor.

Immediately after graduation, one year served in the Soviet Army in the city of Chernigov. I got a military specialty miner-bomber. In 1986, during military service, he participated in the liquidation of consequences of the Chernobyl disaster. Is the liquidators of the Chernobyl accident I level.

== Career ==
Alexey Nilov first appeared on the silver screen at the age of four-plus years in the Soviet feature film, a fairy tale Snegurocka (1968), his great-grandfather, directed by Pavel Kadochnikov. The same film was shot and his father Alexey small, actor Gennadi Nilov.

The widespread popularity of the actor brought one of the main roles (Andrey Larin, a police captain) in the television series Streets of Broken Lights (1997–2004, from the 1st to the 5th season).

== Selected filmography ==
- 1968 – Snegurocka as episode
- 1991 – Labelled as Maxim (Max), a fighter with the local mafia in Crimea
- 1994 – The Year of the Dog as neighbor Vera's
- 1997 – 2004 – Streets of Broken Lights (1–5 seasons) as Andrey Larin
- 2000 – Deadly Force (1 season) as Andrey Larin
- 2003 – One Life as Vladimir, science fiction writer
- 2004 – My Mother, the Bride as Yuri Ivanovsky
- 2008 – 2014 – Liteyny, 4 (1–8 seasons) as Alexey Nilov, a former lawyer
- 2015 – High Stakes as Yury Alexeyevich Sergeev, the owner of an illegal casino
