= Fairytale.Is =

- Directed by: Konstantin Statskiy; Elizaveta Solomina; Aleksandr Barshak
- Written by: Nadezhda Ryaschikova; Lelya Smolina; Anastasia Perova
- Produced by: Mikhail Porechenkov; Maksim Korolyov
- Starring: Elizaveta Boyarskaya; Maksim Matveyev; Mikhail Porechenkov; Konstantin Khabensky
- Cinematography: Artyom Polosatiy; Andrei Katorzhenko
- Production company: Nashe Kino
- Release date: September 13, 2012
- Running time: 92 minutes
- Country: Russia
- Language: Russian
- Budget: $3 500 000

Fairytale.Is (Russian: Сказка. Есть, romanized: Skazka. Est) is a 2012 Russian children's-fantasy-anthology film.

== Plot ==
The picture consists of three short films.

In the first segment, Dasha quarrels with her father and mother and falls into the world of toys because of her yet unborn sister. Because of getting hit with a toy elephant, she gets transported into a new world - the world of toys. Her parents are dolls in this world. Their own daughter becomes her older sister.

In the second segment, the father-architect is fascinated by the project of creating a building for the circus and does not pay any attention to his son Fedya. He ends up spoiling the miniature of the building, and after a quarrel, his father is suddenly transferred to the inside of a circus which has not yet been built for a very unexpected performance.

The third segment tells of a certain school with strange rules. 12-year-old Vanya and a new teacher Svetlana, who came for an internship, find out that during the full moon the teachers and the school itself turn into a living nightmare.

== Cast ==
=== Segment "The World of Toys" ===
- Anfisa Wistinghausen as Dasha
- Elizaveta Boyarskaya as the mother
- Maksim Matveyev as the father
- Mikhail Porechenkov as the Bear
- Konstantin Khabensky as the Encyclopedia
- Andrey Smolyakov as the Evil Clown
- Mikhail Trukhin as the Tape Player
- Darya Moroz as Barbie
- Svetlana Ivanova as the Kewpie
- Sergey Ugryumov as Ken

=== Segment "Childhood Forever" ===
- Vasily Brykov as Fedya
- Aleksei Serebryakov as the father
- Irina Pegova as the mother
- Artur Smolyaninov as the Hare
- Grigory Siyatvinda as the Sprechstahlmeister

=== Segment "Epischo" ===
- Mikhail Kozakov as Stanislav Dalievich Salvadorov, the principal
- Angelina Mirimskaya as Svetlana Krivosheeva
- Ksenia Rappoport as Gala Dmitrievna, the deputy principal
- Gosha Kutsenko as Penkulturnik, the P.E. teacher
- Sergey Burunov as Geokhim, the chemistry teacher
- Alexander Komissarov as Himstorik Vissarionovich, the history teacher
- Alexander Usherdin as Timo Kultunenm the English teacher
- Yola Sanko as Stepanida Neck
- Svetlana Novikova as Aunt Shura
- Pyotr Skvortsov as Vanya Bystin-Okhlo
- Daniel Uskov as Fedya
