= Through the Fire (1982 film) =

- Russian: Сквозь огонь
- Directed by: Leonid Makarychev
- Written by: Albina Shulgina
- Starring: Boris Krichevsky; Aleksey Buldakov; Tatyana Bedova; Aleksandr Susnin; Georgiy Shtil
- Cinematography: Aleksandr Chirov
- Music by: Vladislav Kladnitskiy
- Release date: 1982
- Country: Soviet Union
- Language: Russian

Through the Fire (Russian: Сквозь огонь, romanized: Skvoz ogon) is a 1982 Soviet war film directed by Leonid Makarychev.

== Plot ==
The film tells about the boy Pavlik, who, together with his mother, ended up in the territory occupied by the Nazis. Mother was arrested. Pavlik was an orphan and went on foot to Leningrad.

== Cast ==
- Boris Krichevsky as Pavlik (as Borya Krichevsky)
- Aleksey Buldakov as Savely
- Tatyana Bedova
- Aleksandr Susnin as Grigory Timofeev
- Georgiy Shtil
- Valentin Bukin
- Era Ziganshina
- Natalya Dmitriyeva
- Mikhail Semyonov
- Svetlana Kireeva
