= Mechanical Suite =

2001 film by Dmitriy Meshiev

- Directed by: Dmitry Meskhiev
- Written by: Gennadiy Ostrovskiy
- Produced by: Olga Vasilieva; Svetlana Slityuk
- Starring: Mikhail Porechenkov; Sergei Garmash; Konstantin Khabensky; Sergei Makovetsky; Andrei Zibrov
- Cinematography: Sergei Machilsky
- Edited by: Tamara Lipartia
- Music by: Leonid Fyodorov; Svyatoslav Kurashov; Vladimir Volkov
- Release date: 2001
- Running time: 97 minutes
- Country: Russia
- Language: Russian

Mechanical Suite (Russian: Механическая сюита, romanized: Mekhanicheskaya syuita) is a 2001 Russian comedy-drama film directed by Dmitry Meskhiev.

The film is based on the story Brothers by Janusz Głowacki.

== Plot ==
Kolya (Sergei Golovkin), an employee from the patent department of a plant, goes to Lykovo near St. Petersburg for the weekend and dies of a heart attack. The administration of the plant decides to transport the body to the homeland of the deceased for burial. For this purpose two people are sent on a business trip: Markerants (Sergei Garmash), who at any time can develop an ulcer, and business-minded Mityagin (Mikhail Porechenkov).

On the way, Mityagin offers Markerants to drink a toast in the dining car for Kolya, for destiny, for their country. All ends with Markerants giving all the money collected by the plant for Kolya's burial to some woman named Lyuyba (Evgeniya Dobrovolskaya).

Having lost their travel money, they go on an adventure and drive with the stiff in a normal train compartment. A chance passenger, Edouard (Konstantin Khabensky), who has stolen an item worth $50,000 from a factory, drops his immensely heavy suitcase on the dead man's head. Edouard ends up thinking that he is the culprit in Kolya's death. To get rid of the evidence, he throws the corpse out the window. The greedy Mityagin decides to take advantage of the situation and demands money so that he will not to give out the "murderer". This leads to everyone subsequently finding themselves under the persecution of the mafia and the police.

== Cast ==
- Mikhail Porechenkov as Mityagin
- Sergei Garmash as Markerants
- Konstantin Khabensky as Edouard
- Sergei Makovetsky as operative officer Plyuganovskiy
- Andrei Zibrov as machinist Viktor
- Oksana Bazilevich as striptease dancer Asya
- Aleksandr Bashirov as man in a police car
- Zoya Buryak as beer seller
- Irina Rozanova as Olga
- Sergei Golovkin as deceased Kolya
- Yevgenia Dobrovolskaya as Lyuba
- Yury Kuznetsov as pathologist
- Mikhail Wasserbaum as Olga's lover
- Aleksandr Fatyushin as Major Lebedev
- Zinaida Sharko as Plyuganovskiy's mother

== Awards ==
- Yevgenia Dobrovolskaya received the Best Supporting Actress prize at the Nika (2001), Golden Aries (2001) and "Constellation" (2001) awards.
