= The Circus Burned Down, and the Clowns Have Gone =

- Directed by: Vladimir Bortko
- Written by: Vladimir Bortko; Nataliya Bortko
- Produced by: Aleksandr Golutva; Igor Tolstunov
- Starring: Nikolai Karachentsov
- Cinematography: Sergei Lando; Yevgeni Shermergor
- Edited by: Leda Semyonova
- Music by: Vladimir Dashkevich
- Release date: 23 March 1998
- Running time: 111 minutes
- Country: Russia
- Language: Russian

The Circus Burned Down, and the Clowns Have Gone (Russian: Цирк сгорел, и клоуны разбежались Tsirk sgorel, i klouny razbezhalis) is a 1998 Russian fantasy drama film directed by Vladimir Bortko and starring Nikolai Karachentsov. It tells the story of a successful film director who is about to turn 50 and struggles with financiers, his insane mother and a mysterious woman who tells him how meaningless his life is.

== Cast ==
- Nikolai Karachentsov as Nikolai Khudokormov
- Tanya Yu as Stranger
- Zinaida Sharko as Nikolai's Mother
- Nina Ruslanova as Toma
- Maria Shukshina as Lena
- Tatyana Vasilyeva as Margarita
- Kseniya Kachalina as Alya
- Sergey Dreyden as Aleksei
- Pyotr Zaychenko as Igor
- Rudolf Furmanov as Artyom
- Yury Kuznetsov as cossack

== Accolades ==
Zinaida Sharko won the Best Actress award at the 1998 Open Russian Film Festival in Sochi. Vladimir Dashkevich was nominated for the Nika Award for Best Music.
