= Yury Kuznetsov (actor) =

Russian actor (born 1946)

- Юрий Кузнецов
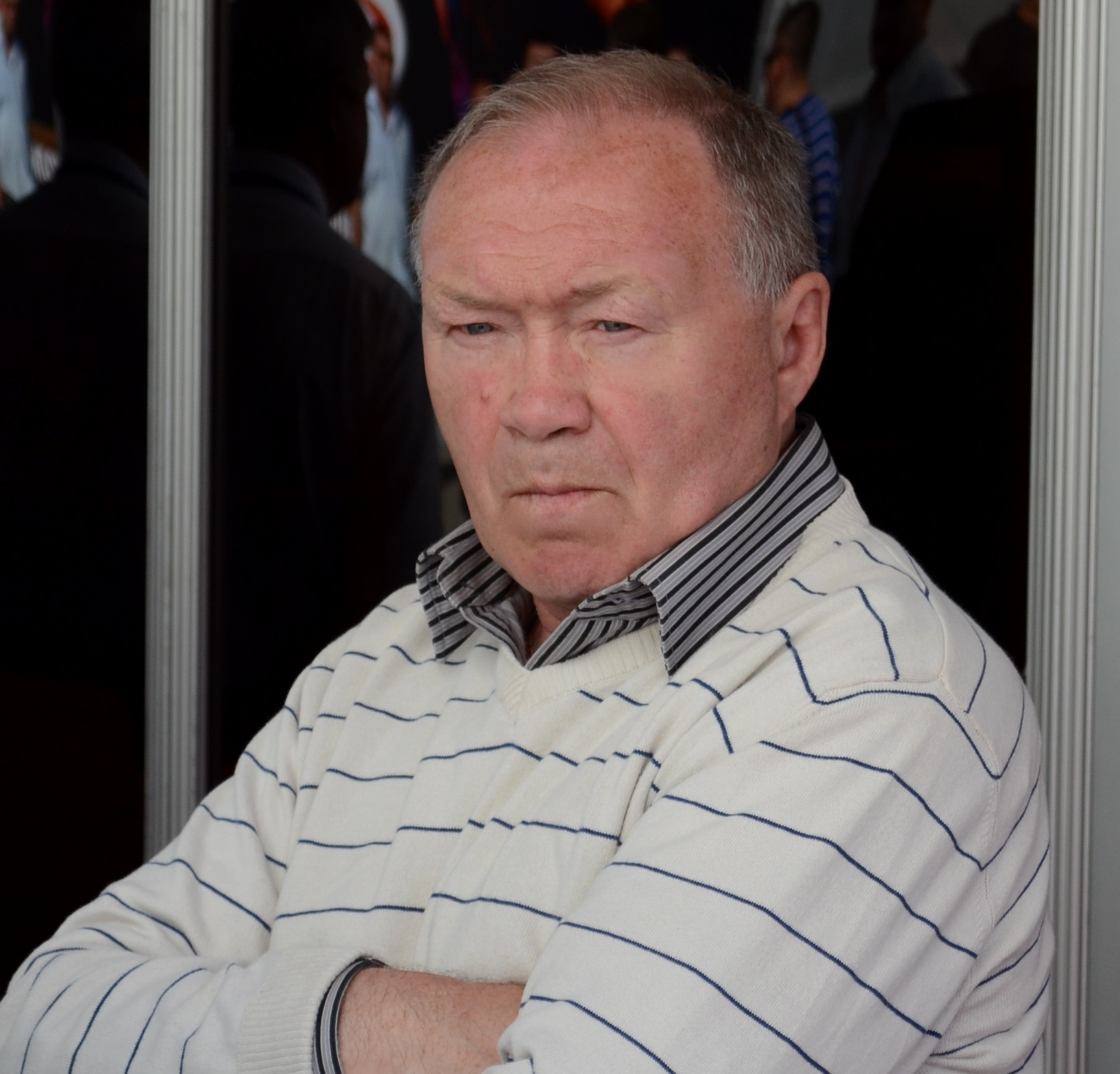
- Kuznetsov in 2011
- Born: 3 September 1946 (age 79); Abakan, Khakas Autonomous Oblast, Krasnoyarsk Krai, Russian SFSR, Soviet Union
- Occupation: Actor
- Years active: 1969–present

Yury Aleksandrovich Kuznetsov (Russian: Юрий Александрович Кузнецов; born 3 September 1946) is a Soviet and Russian stage and film actor. People's Artist of Russia (2026).

== Biography ==
Yury Kuznetsov was born in Abakan. In 1969, he graduated from the acting department of the Far Eastern Pedagogical Institute in Vladivostok. He started a theatrical career and was a member of the following institutions:

- 1969 — 1979: Khabarovsk Drama
- 1979 — 1986: Omsk Drama Theater
- 1986 — 1999: Leningrad Theatre of Comedy

== Filmography ==
- Torpedo Bombers (1983) as Lieutenant colonel Fomenko, air regiment commander
- Charlotte's Necklace (1984) as Valery Korchyonov, criminal
- A Rogue's Saga (1984) as Volodya
- My Friend Ivan Lapshin (1984) as Head of police department
- Confrontation (1985) as Aleksei Ivanovich Zhukov, police major
- Breakthrough (1986) as Gesha Vyazigin, miner
- Once Lied (1987) as Stanislav "Stas" Lapshin, nonconformist painter
- The Cold Summer of 1953 (1987) as Ivan Zotov, director of the trading post
- Heart of a Dog (1988) as well-read janitor
- Stray Dogs (1989) as Ivan Maksimchuk, special squad commander
- The Man Who Doesn't Return (1991) as Andrei Fyodorovich Korneyev
- Arithmetic of a Murder (1991) as Pyotr Prokofyevich Konev, investigator
- Genius (1991) as Andrei Sergeyevich Kuzmin, police major
- Afghan Breakdown (1991) as Shchup, helicopter pilot
- Good Luck, Gentlemen (1992) as Astoria Hotel doorman
- Over the Dark Water (1992) as Sergei
- Prison Romance (1993) as Vasily Sergeyevich Koshkaryov, investigator
- Katya Ismailova (1994) as Romanov, investigator
- What a Wonderful Game (1995) as Filimon Semyonovich
- Brother (1997) as Hoffman, the German
- Schizophrenia (1997) as Walter, head of the security company
- American Bet (1997) as Uncle Misha
- The Circus Burned Down, and the Clowns Have Gone (1998) as cossack
- Streets of Broken Lights (1998–2004) as Yuri Aleksandrovich "Mukhomor" Petrenko, police lieutenant colonel
- Women's Property (1998) as Kolosov, theater director
- The Captain's Daughter (2000) as Ivan Ignatyevich
- The Christmas Miracle (2000) as Barankulov
- Peculiarities of the National Hunt in Winter Season (2000) as Yuri Nikolayevich Kurtsov
- Life Is Full of Fun (2001) as Bozhok, Lira's husband
- Mechanical Suite (2001) as morgue pathologist
- Antikiller (2002) as Aleksandr Semyonovich Krylov
- Peculiarities of National Politics (2003) as Stepan Nikolayevich Oslyabin, election candidate
- Moths Games (2004) as Stepanych
- The Island (2006) as Tikhon Petrovich, admiral
- Practical Joke (2008) as Mikhail Mikhailovich, school director
- Tsar (2009) as Malyuta Skuratov
- Pioneer Heroes (2015) as Katya's grandfather
- The Duelist (2016) as Kolychev family servant
- The Man Who Surprised Everyone (2018) as grandfather Nikolai
- Yolki 7 (2018) as Yevgeny Valentinovich Prokhorov, Denis' father
- To the Lake (2019) as Boris Mikhailovich, Sergey's father
- Fire (2020) as Georgich
- Captain Volkonogov Escaped (2021) as Ignatiy Alekseyevich
- Disobedient (2022) as father Anatoly
- Aunt Martha (2022) as Vasily Semyonovich Samsonov, pensioner
- Peace! Love! Chewing Gum! (2023) as uncle Venya
- Yolki 10 (2023) as Petrovich
- The Enchanted Tinderbox (2024) as uncle Semyon

== Awards and honours ==
- Merited Artist of the Russian Federation (15 February 2006)
- Nika Award for Best Supporting Actor (2019) – for his performance as grandfather Nikolai in The Man Who Surprised Everyone
- Tsarskoselskaya Art Award (2024)
- People's Artist of Russia (30 March 2026)

== Sources ==
- Yury Kuznetsov at IMDb
- Kynoslovar. Т.2. Vol.2. Ed., 2001. - P.94-95.
