= One Life (2003 film) =

- Russian: Жизнь одна
- Directed by: Vitaliy Moskalenko
- Written by: Aleksandr Borodyansky; Lyana Korolyova
- Produced by: Aleksandr Litvinov; Yevgeny Zobov
- Starring: Tatyana Yakovenko; Alexey Nilov; Sergey Bezrukov; Tatyana Lyutaeva; Aleksey Kravchenko
- Cinematography: Yury Nevsky
- Edited by: Olga Kolesnikova
- Music by: Alexey Rybnikov
- Production company: Genre
- Release date: 2003
- Running time: 99 min.
- Country: Russia
- Language: Russian

One Life (Russian: Жизнь одна, romanized: Zhizn odna) is a 2003 Russian drama film directed by Vitaliy Moskalenko.

Nomination in the category "Best Film Music" of the Golden Eagle Award.

== Plot ==
The film tells about a woman who could not forgive her husband the intrigue with the secretary and completely gave herself to journalism, which caused serious health problems, as a result of which she went to rest in a sanatorium.

== Cast ==
- Tatyana Yakovenko as Marina
- Alexey Nilov as Vladimir
- Sergey Bezrukov as Pavel
- Tatyana Lyutaeva as Maryana
- Aleksey Kravchenko as Konstantin
- Aleksandr Bashirov as photographer
- Tatyana Orlova as administrator
- Alyona Yakovleva as Natasha
- Eduard Martsevich as Academician Belenkin
- Vladimir Ilyin as Kepka
- Fyodor Dobronravov as bartender
