= Breakthrough (1986 film) =

1986 film by Dmitri Svetozarov

- Russian: Прорыв
- Directed by: Dmitri Svetozarov
- Written by: Albina Schulgina
- Starring: Oleg Borisov; Andrei Rostotsky; Yuri Demich
- Cinematography: Sergei Astakhov
- Edited by: Eldar Shakhverdiyev
- Music by: Alexandr Kutikov; Andrey Makarevich; Aleksandr Zaitsev
- Production company: Lenfilm
- Release date: 1986
- Running time: 99 minutes
- Country: Soviet Union
- Language: Russian

Breakthrough (Russian: Прорыв, romanized: Proryv) is a 1986 Soviet disaster film directed by Dmitri Svetozarov.

The film shows a major accident that occurred during the construction of a tunnel leading to the fictional station Petrovskaya of Leningrad Metro. It is based on a similar accident in 1974, in the tunnel between stations Lesnaya and Ploschad Muzhestva, playing up its unique design and geological conditions.

== Plot ==
The film depicts a major accident that occurs during the construction of a transit tunnel leading to the fictional “Petrovskaya” station in the Leningrad Metro.

Lenmetrostroy’s chief, Poluektov, decides to route the tunnel through an underground river. During drilling, a quicksand flow breaks through the frozen soil and begins to flood the transit tunnel rapidly. Realizing that they cannot hold back the water, the workers flee down the tunnel toward the airtight gate. Along the way, the foreman, Osmorkin, falls behind, weakened by exhaustion. The mine supervisor, Martynov, orders two workers to go back and search for Osmorkin but to no avail. By this time, the tunnel is half-submerged. Nonetheless, Martynov and a worker named Vyazigin set out in an inflatable boat to find Osmorkin. They rescue him and return to the gate, which they manage to close just in time.

When Poluektov arrives on-site, he orders an evacuation, warning that the gate won’t hold under the pressure. The Lenmetrostroy leadership decides to evacuate the nearby residential areas with military assistance. During a meeting, Poluektov, following the advice of engineer Kostyra, approves the construction of a concrete barrier and the controlled flooding of the tunnel. Meanwhile, sinkholes form on the surface, causing buildings to collapse. Martynov convinces Poluektov that one barrier won’t be enough, prompting the chief to give him two hours to build a second one.

Several tense hours pass as they await the tunnel's flooding. Afterward, the exhausted workers finally head home.

== Cast ==
- Oleg Borisov — Head of Lenmetrostroi Boris Savelyevich Poluektov
- Andrei Rostotsky — Martynov, head of the mine
- Yuri Demich — Deputy. Chief of Lenmetrostroi Yurasov
- Mikhail Danilov — Marchuk
- Alexander Susnin — foreman Osmyorkin
- Yury Kuznetsov — sinker Vyazigin
- Andrey Krasko — Drifters Alexander and Bronislav Kostromins
- Vladimir Baranov — sinker Sherstobitov
- Valery Kravchenko — Morozov, the engineer of the mine electric locomotive
- Natalia Akimova — wife of Martynov (daughter of Poluektov)
- Yuri Soloviev — engineer Kostyrya
- Ivan Agafonov — Comrade Serov, from the regional party committee
