= The Guard (1990 film) =

1990 film

- Directed by: Aleksandr Rogozhkin
- Written by: Ivan Loshchilin
- Starring: Aleksey Buldakov
- Cinematography: Valeri Martynov
- Edited by: Tamara Denisova
- Production company: Lenfilm
- Release date: February 1990
- Running time: 96 minutes
- Country: Soviet Union
- Language: Russian

The Guard (Russian: Караул, romanized: Karaul) is a 1990 Soviet drama film directed by Aleksandr Rogozhkin. It was entered into the 40th Berlin International Film Festival where it won the Alfred Bauer Prize. The film is shot entirely in sepia.

== Plot ==
The film is based on the real story of a Soviet internal troops soldier Artūras Sakalauskas who killed his entire unit (the karaul) as a result of Dedovschina (hazing). The plot unfolds mostly on board of the prisoner transport rail car guarded by a unit of paramilitary conscripts.

== Cast ==
- Sergei Kupriyanov as private Andrey Iveren
- Aleksey Buldakov as senior warrant officer Paromov, commander of the guard
- Dmitri Iosifov as senior sergeant Alexey Zhokhin, assistant to the commander of the guard
- Aleksei Poluyan as private Nikolai Mazur, the cook
- Aleksandr Smirnov as private Khaustov
- Taras Denisenko as corporal Boris Korchenuk
- Vasili Domrachyov as private Nishchenkin
- Renat Ibragimov as private Ibragimov
- Valeri Kravchenko as Khorkov, the convict
- Aleksey Zaytsev as the convict
- Nikita Mikhailovsky as the snitch convict
