= The Man Who Doesn't Return =

- Russian: Невозвращенец
- Directed by: Sergey Snezhkin
- Written by: Aleksandr Kabakov; Sergey Snezhkin
- Starring: Yury Kuznetsov; Nikolai Yeremenko Sr.; Yuriy Oskin; Viktor Aristov; Era Ziganshina
- Cinematography: Vladimir Burykin
- Music by: Isaak Dunayevsky; Aleksandr Knaifel
- Production company: Lenfilm
- Release date: 1991
- Running time: 123 min.
- Country: Soviet Union
- Language: Russian

The Man Who Doesn't Return (Russian: Невозвращенец, romanized: Nevozvrashchenets) is a 1991 Soviet thriller film directed by Sergey Snezhkin. This fictional film's plot features a planned coup against the Soviet government. By coincidence, this made the film very topical because it aired on television on August 20, 1991, during a real coup attempt in the Soviet Union, one that lead to the Soviet Union's demise later that year.

== Plot ==
A television reporter finds out about an upcoming coup and begins an investigation.

== Cast ==
- Yury Kuznetsov as Andrey Korneyev
- Nikolai Yeremenko Sr. as Viktor Andreyevich
- Yuriy Oskin as Kolya
- Viktor Aristov as dissident
- Era Ziganshina as Galina Mikhaylovna Grigoryeva (Melentyeva)
- Joseph Raihelgauz as Andrey Korneyev's friend
- Elena Anisimova
- Leonid Kulagin as writer
- Natalya Dmitriyeva as Lena
- Igor Efimov as general
