= Stray Dogs (1989 film) =

- Russian: Псы
- Directed by: Dmitry Svetozarov
- Written by: Arkadiy Krasilshchikov; Dmitry Svetozarov
- Starring: Sergey Kokovkin; Andrey Krasko; Aleksey Krychenkov; Yuri Kuznetsov; Mikhail Zhigalov
- Cinematography: Grigoriy Belenkiy
- Music by: Aleksandr Kutikov; Andrey Makarevich; Alexander Zaitsev
- Release date: 1989
- Running time: 96 minute
- Country: Soviet Union
- Language: Russian

Stray Dogs (Russian: Псы) is a 1989 Soviet thriller directed by Dmitry Svetozarov.

== Plot ==
The film tells about hunters who go to an abandoned city to kill wolves, whose victims are residents of this city, and instead of wolves they find cannibal dogs there.

== Cast ==
- Sergey Kokovkin
- Andrey Krasko
- Aleksey Krychenkov
- Yuri Kuznetsov
- Mikhail Zhigalov
