= Women's Property =

- Directed by: Dmitry Meskhiev
- Written by: Yuri Korotkov; Natalia Chepik; Valentin Chernykh
- Produced by: Yelena Yatsura
- Starring: Konstantin Khabensky; Elena Safonova
- Cinematography: Yuri Shaigardanov
- Music by: Ivan Nikolayevich Smirnov; Mikhail Smirnov
- Production company: Mosfilm
- Release date: 1999
- Running time: 89 minutes
- Country: Russia
- Language: Russian

Women's Property (Russian: Женская собственность, romanized: Zhenskaya sobstvennost) is a Russian 1999 romantic drama based on the eponymous story by Valentin Chernykh, directed by Dmitry Meskhiev.

== Plot ==
A young entrant, Andrei Kalinin, passes exams to a theatrical institute. He lacks artistic acumen yet has plenty of charm. After getting to know that there are chances he won't succeed, he decides to convince a member of the committee, Elizaveta Kamenskaya, that he has to enroll exactly that very year. In a sequence of chance events, Andrey falls for her - the prominent actress he used to admire being a child. She is much older than him and lonely. After a few years of relationships, it turns out that she has cancer. Despite her incurable illness, Andrei marries Elizaveta. After her death, his professional life becomes unstable - while his romantic affairs are taking even more unpredictable turns.

== Cast ==
- Konstantin Khabensky as Andrei Kalinin
- Elena Safonova as Elizaveta Kamenskaya, teacher of the theatrical institute
- Aleksandr Abdulov as Sazonov, principal of the theatrical institute
- Amalia Mordvinova as Olga
- Nina Usatova as Raika, film director
- Yury Kuznetsov as Kolosov, theatre director
- Viktor Bychkov as Igor
- Ilya Shakunov as Anton
- Andrei Zibrov as Kostya, Olga's ex-husband
- Tatyana Tkach as Mira, film director
- Tatyana Lyutaeva as Zoya Borschevskaya
- Aleksandr Polovtsev as Yasha, group leader
- Mikhail Porechenkov as Andrei's friend
- Lyubov Tischenko as neighbor

== Awards ==
- 1999 — Best Actress award at the international film festival of actors "Constellation" (Sozvezdie) of the Russian Film Actors Guild (Elena Safonova).
- 2000 — Best Actress award at the 6th Russian film festival "Literature and Cinema" in Gatchina (Nina Usatova).
- 2000 — Best Actor award at the 6th Russian film festival "Literature and Cinema" in Gatchina (Konstantin Khabensky).
- 2000 — Prize of the press "for providing the best program of films" at the VIII All-Russian Film Festival "Vivat, Cinema of Russia!" in St. Petersburg (Dmitry Meskhiev).
