= Mikhail Porechenkov =

Russian actor, director

- Михаил Пореченков
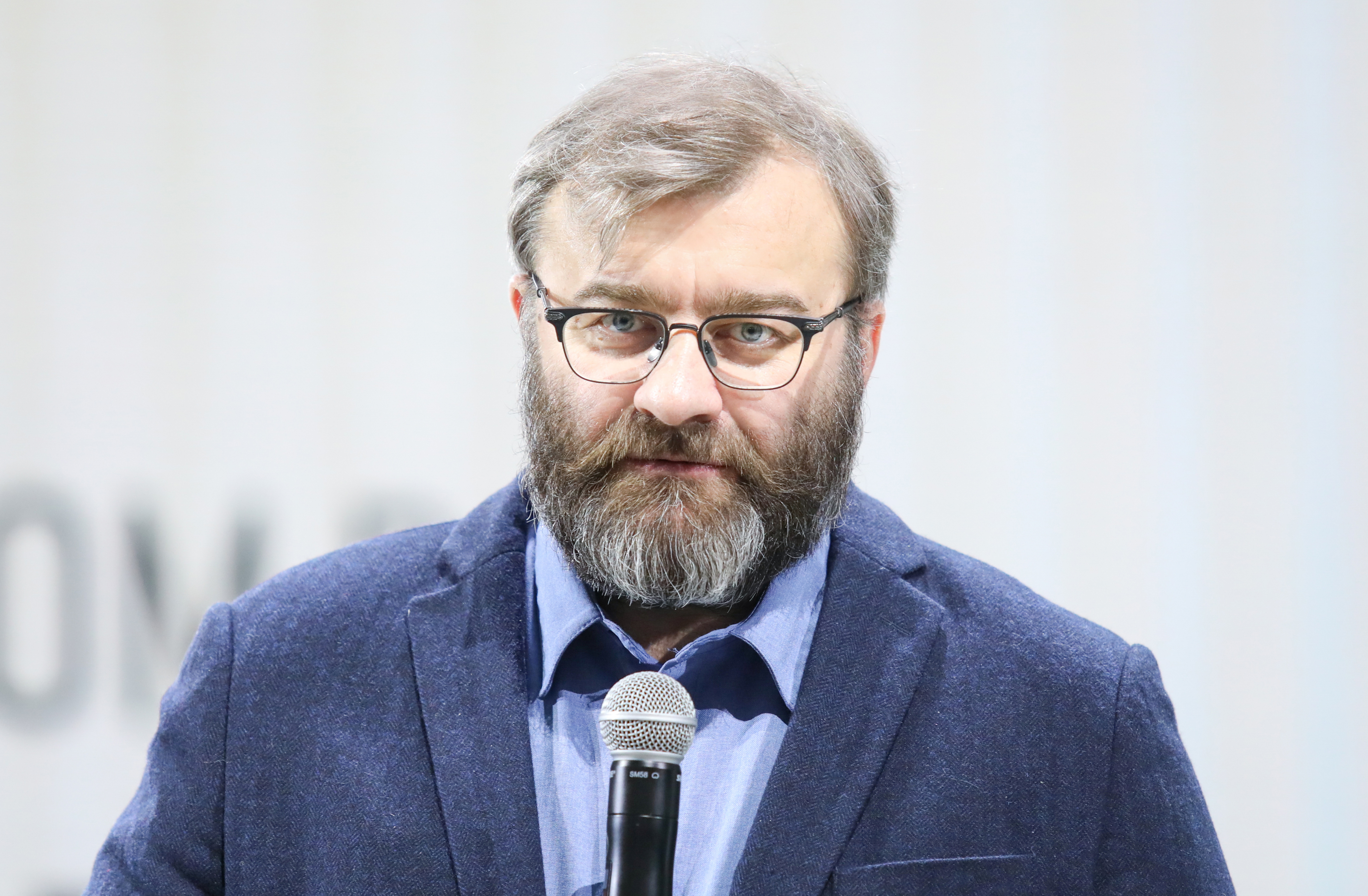
- Porechenkov in 2024
- Born: 2 March 1969 (age 57); Leningrad, Russian SFSR, Soviet Union
- Occupations: Actor; director; producer
- Years active: 1994–present
- Spouses: Ekaterina (divorced); Olga (m. 2000)
- Children: 5

Mikhail Yevgenyevich Porechenkov (Russian: Михаил Евгеньевич Пореченков; born 2 March 1969) is a Russian film actor, producer, and director. He became famous after his lead role as FSB Agent Alexey Nikolayev in the TV series National Security Agent (1999–2005). In 2008, Porechenkov produced, directed and starred in D-Day (День Д), a Russian remake of the 1985 American action film Commando.

== Biography ==
Porechenkov was born in Leningrad, Russian SFSR, Soviet Union to parents Yevgeny Mikhailovich Porechenkov and Galina Nikolayevna Porechenkova. His father was a Soviet Navy officer, and his mother was a building engineer. Since his parents were busy at work, he, in general, was raised until the age of 5 by his grandmother in a village in Pskov Oblast, and then, before going to school, he returned to Leningrad. In the late 1970s, his father was appointed as an inspector of the Polish Gdańsk Shipyard, where Soviet ships were built, thus, in the first years of schooling, Porechenkov had to leave Leningrad and move, along with his family, to the Polish People's Republic. There, he began to study in a Soviet Embassy boarding school in Warsaw. During the education period, he became interested in sports, especially boxing. After graduating from school in 1986, he went to the Estonian SSR, where he entered the Tallinn Higher Military-Political Construction School to earn a political officer degree. Despite sporting achievements—Porechenkov earned the rank of the Candidate for Master of Sport in Boxing after his successful performance at the college championship and municipal tournament in Tallinn, he was dismissed from the college in 1990, just 10 days before his graduation. When he returned home from Estonia, he worked in a picture framing studio, and attended Armen Dzhigarkhanyan's class in the Gerasimov Institute of Cinematography (VGIK), which he did not graduate from. In 1991, he entered the Leningrad State Institute of Theatre, Music and Cinematography (LGITMiK), Veniamin Filshtinsky's class, and graduated in 1996.

== Controversy ==
In October 2014, Porechenkov was wanted by Ukrainian authorities for allegedly engaging in terrorist activities in Donetsk. Porechenkov was filmed firing a heavy weapon whilst visiting fighters besieging Donetsk International Airport and wearing protective clothing with 'Press' markings. Ukrainian officials said they would charge him with "participation in terrorist activities of the so-called DNR" and participation in activities of "armed gangs." Since 2015, Porechenkov is banned from entering Ukraine.

== Awards and nominations ==
=== Awards ===
- Golden Mask, 1996 – for the role of Pozzo in Yuri Butusov's play Waiting for Godot
- Golden Sofit, ????
- Sozvezdie, ????
- Vladislav Strzhelchik Prize, 1999 – Ensemble cast (Yuri Butusov's play Waiting for Godot)
- FSP Prize, 2008 - Acting Work (for the lead role in TV series Liquidation and the creation of Russian officer characters in other films)
- Oleg Tabakov Prize, 2009 (for the lead role in Anton Yakovlev's play The Kreutzer Sonata)

=== Nominations ===
- Golden Eagle Award, 2006 – Best Leading Actor (The 9th Company)
- Golden Eagle Award, 2006 – Best Supporting Actor (Soldier's Decameron)
- Nika Award, 2006 – Best Supporting Actor (The 9th Company)
- MTV Russia Movie Awards, 2006 – Best Male Performance (The 9th Company)
- MTV Russia Movie Awards, 2007 – Best Kiss (Svyaz)
- Golden Eagle Award, 2009 – Best TV Actor (Liquidation)
- MTV Russia Movie Awards, 2009 – Best Male Performance (Realnyy papa)
- MTV Russia Movie Awards, 2009 – Best Comedic Performance (Realnyy papa)
- Georges Awards, 2015 – Russian Actor of the Year (Poddubny)
- Georges Awards, 2015 – Russian Hero of the Year (Poddubny)

== Filmography ==
=== Film ===
- Koleso lyubvi (1994)
- Telo kapitana budet predano zemle, a starshiy michman budet pet (1998)
- Women's Property (1999)
- National Security Agent (1999)
- Gangster Petersburg: Baron (2000) - Maks
- Peculiarities of the National Hunt in Winter Season (2000)
- Mechanical Suite (2002) - Mityagin
- Vovochka (2002) - Lt. Grigori Pinduzhin
- Dnevnik kamikadze (2003)
- Trio (2003) - Alexei
- Peculiarities of National Politics (2003) - Vanya
- Tayna volchey pasti (2004)
- Soldatskiy dekameron (2005) - Panteleyev
- The 9th Company (2005) - Aleksandr Dygalo
- Bolshaya lyubov (2006) - Anton Ulybabov
- Svyaz (2006) - Ilya
- Zhara (2006) - Mikhail Porechenkov
- The Great Love (2006)
- 1612 (2007) - Prince Dmitri Pozharsky
- Realnyy papa (2008)
- D-Day (2008) - Ivan
- The New Year's Rate Plan (2008) - Barinov
- Na kryshe mira (2008) - Vassili
- Dr. Tyrsa (2010)
- Without Men (2010)
- Counter-Game (2011)
- Fairytale.Is (2011) - The Bear
- The Marathon (2013)
- Iron Ivan (2014) - Ivan Poddubny
- The Shadow (2017)

=== TV ===
- Spetsnaz (2002) - Wallens
- Lines of Fate (2003) - Igor
- The Fall of the Empire (2006) - Ensign with white flag
- The Storm Gate (2006) - Maj. Egorov
- Deadly Force (2006) - Nikita Uvarov
- Liquidation (2007) - Krechetov Vitaly
- Isaev (2009) - Graf Vorontsov
- Heavenly Court (2011-2014) - Veniamin
- The White Guard (2012)
- Crisis (2014, Episode 8: "How Far Would You Go") -Victor Vries
- The Bridge (2017)
- Trotsky (2017) - Alexander Parvus
