= Zoya Buryak =

Soviet and Russian actress

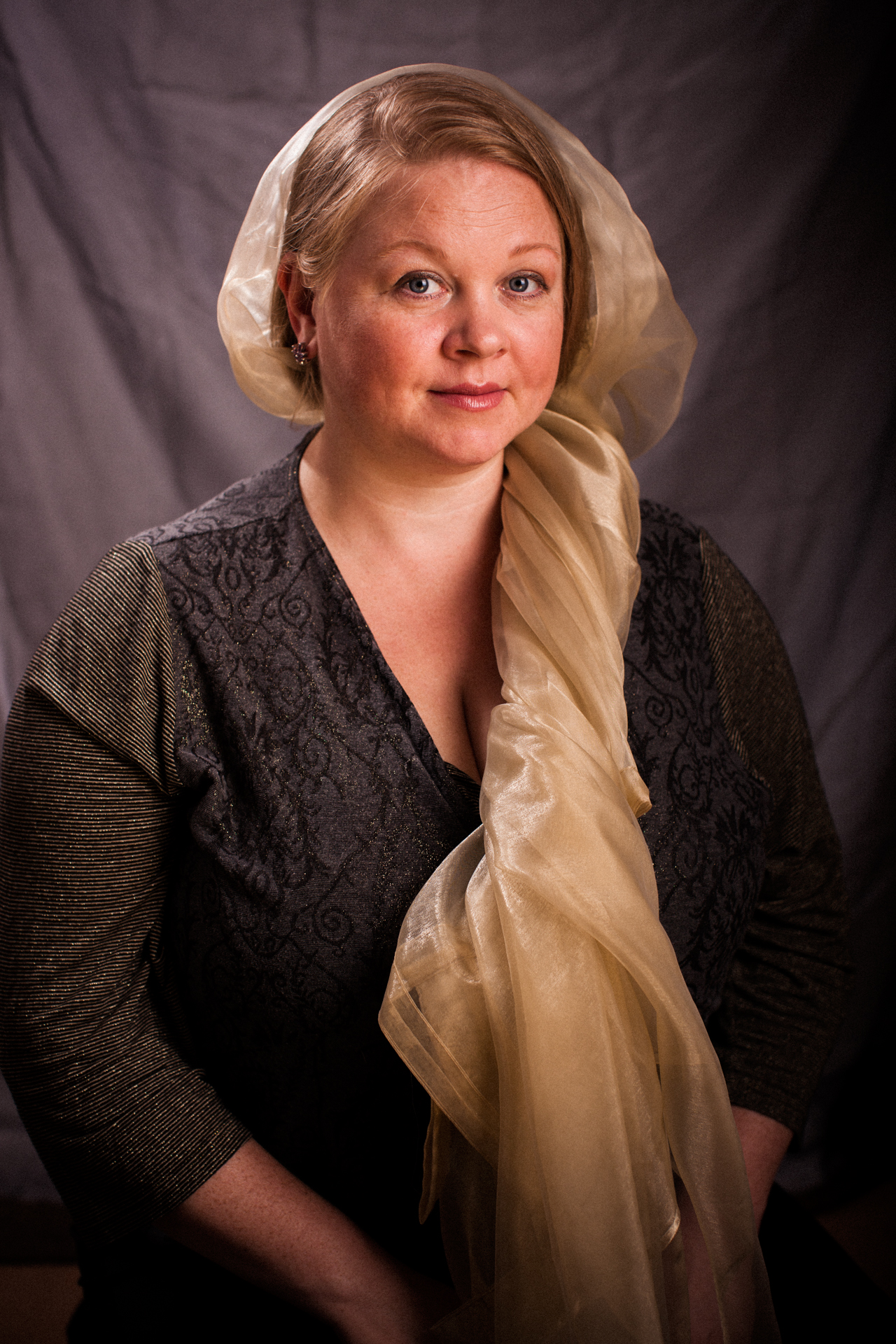
- Born: Zoya Yurievna Buryak; 6 November 1966 (age 59); Krasnoyarsk, RSFSR, USSR
- Website: Зоя Буряк

Zoya Yurievna Buryak (Russian: Зо́я Ю́рьевна Буря́к; 6 November 1966, Krasnoyarsk) is a Soviet and Russian film and stage actress.

== Biography ==
Zoya Buriak was born in Krasnoyarsk on 6 November 1966. In 1971 her family moved to Odessa.

In 1985, after graduation, she entered Russian State Institute of Performing Arts for the course of Lev Dodin.

In 1990 she graduated from the institute and was accepted into the troupe of the Youth Theatre on the Fontanka.

== Awards ==
- Honored Artist of Russia (2005)

== Selected filmography ==
- 1988 — The Cold Summer of 1953
- 1994 — Tsar Ivan the Terrible
- 1994 — Life and Extraordinary Adventures of Private Ivan Chonkin
- 1995 — Peculiarities of the National Hunt
- 2001 — Mechanical Suite
- 2003 — Lines of Fate
- 2008 — Hitler goes Kaput!
- 2008 — Black Hunters
- 2011 — Burnt by the Sun 2: The Citadel
- 2012 — Lost in Siberia
- 2012 — The Admirer
