= The Chekist =

1992 film

- Film poster
- Directed by: Aleksandr Rogozhkin
- Written by: Jacques Baynac
- Story by: Vladimir Zazubrin
- Produced by: Oleg Konkov; Guy Seligman
- Starring: Igor Sergeyev
- Cinematography: Valeri Myulgaut
- Edited by: Tamara Denisova
- Music by: Dmitry Pavlov
- Release date: 1992
- Running time: 91 minutes
- Countries: Russia; France
- Language: Russian

The Chekist (Russian: Чекист) is a 1992 Russian-French historical drama film directed by Aleksandr Rogozhkin, based on a 1923 short story by Vladimir Zazubrin. It tells the story of a bloody work and downfall of a Soviet Cheka security official involved in mass executions during the Russian Civil War. It was screened in the Un Certain Regard section at the 1992 Cannes Film Festival.

== Plot ==
The film is set during the Russian Civil War in the period of the Red Terror. In a provincial Cheka (the All-Russian Emergency Commission for Combating Counter-Revolution and Sabotage) office in an unnamed small town, routine bureaucratic work is taking place. Every day, a Cheka troika tribunal made of director Srubov and his assistants Pepel and Katz reads out a long list of all kinds of real and perceived counter-revolutionaries and class enemies. Those arrested are always immediately found guilty and the sentence, regardless of the accusation, gender and age of the person, is the same – to be shot.

The terrible conveyor of death operates in the basement, overseen by Srubov: the prisoners are systematically taken out of their cell, ordered to undress, placed against the wall in fives, and shot, usually in the back of the head. Following the secret killings, the naked corpses are then dragged by the feet through a special window in the cellar, loaded into a truck, and taken away, to forever disappear without a trace.

Srubov, a young man from an intellectual family, philosophically talks of the historical necessity of extermination in the service of the Bolshevik Revolution. He is highly organised, dutiful, ruthless, and absolutely loyal to the cause. Eventually, however, pangs of conscience become so unbearable to Srubov that, after his own father is shot by his Cheka comrade and personal friend Katz, he experiences a nervous breakdown and is committed to a mental asylum. Medical examination reveals a stigma in the shape of a bullet scar on the back of his head. In a sequence ominously similar to the executions, he is ordered to undress, placed against the wall, and sprayed with water from a hose.

== Cast ==
- Igor Sergeyev as Andrey Pavlovich Srubov
- Aleksei Poluyan as Ian Karlovich Pepel
- Mikhail Vasserbaum as Isaac "Isa" Katz
- Sergey Isavnin as Khudonogov
- Vasili Domrachyov as Solomin
- Aleksandr Medvedev as Mudynya
- Aleksandr Kharashkevich as Boje
- Igor Golovin as the commandant
- Nina Usatova as the cleaner
- Sergey Migitsko as Captain Klimenko's relative

== Production ==
The Chekist was adapted by Jacques Baynac from Vladimir Zazubrin's short story "Щепка" (known variably in English as "Sliver", "The Splinter", or "The Chip"), which was written in 1923 but has remained unpublished until the Glasnost era in 1989 when it was printed in the journal Sibirskie Ogni. Zazubrin, a former Bolshevik infiltrator of the Okhrana and veteran of both sides of the Civil War, himself fell victim to the Great Purge and was himself arrested and executed in 1937, along with Valerian Pravdukhin who wrote the preface for the original intended publication.

The film was produced by Oleg Konkov and Guy Seligman for the French TV ARTE. It was screened in the Un Certain Regard section at the 1992 Cannes Film Festival.

== Reception ==
Piers Handling, director of the Toronto International Film Festival, said of the film: "Rogozhkin eventually penetrates into the psychotic mind of the Chekist with a moment of sublime insight, reminiscent of Bertolucci's equally disturbing portrait of the fascist killer in The Conformist. The Chekist is an overwhelming cry in the face of such madness."
