= Aleksey Buldakov =

Soviet and Russian actor (1951–2019)

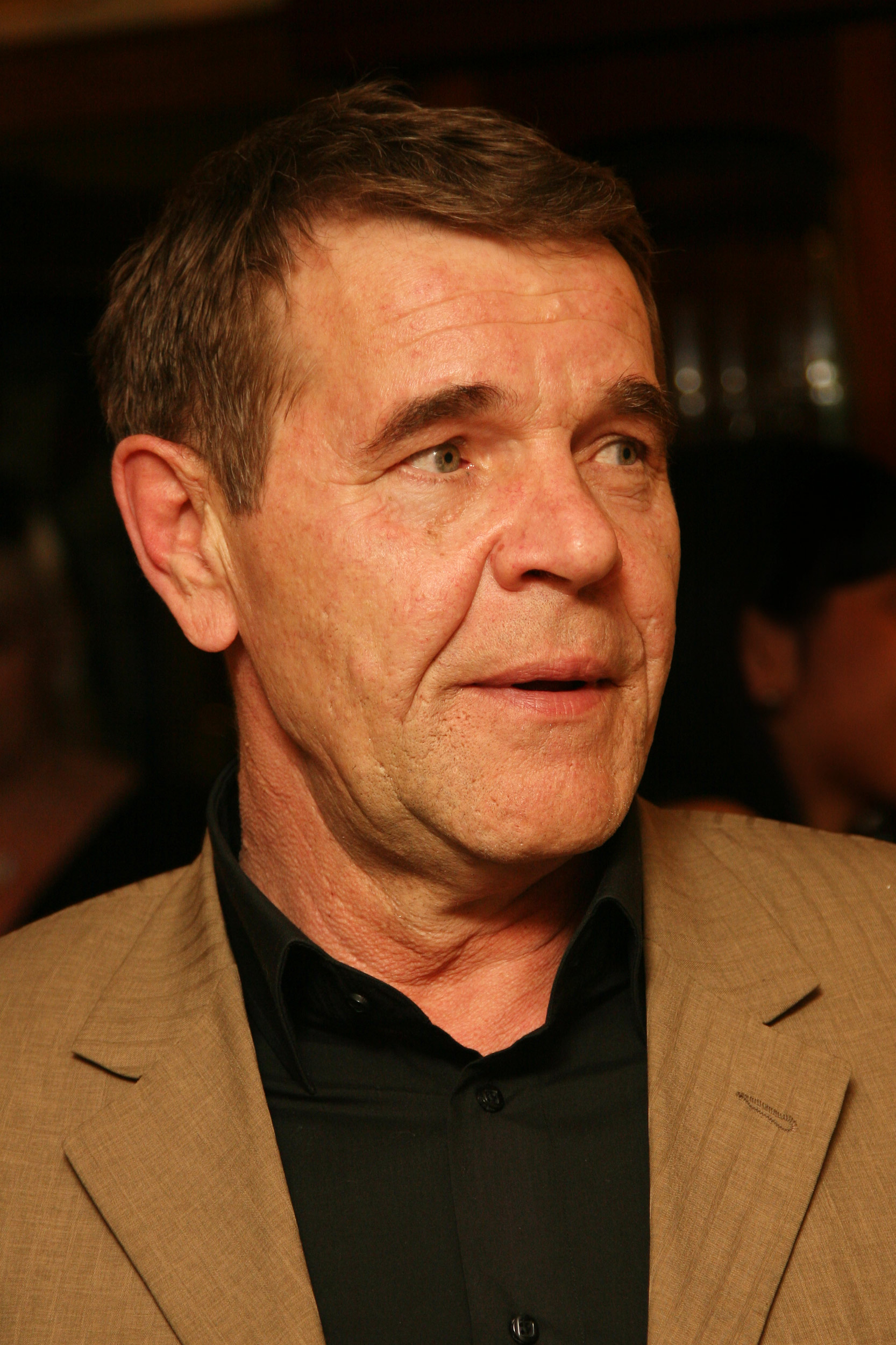
- Buldakov in May 2008
- Born: Aleksey Ivanovich Buldakov; 26 March 1951; Makarovka, Altai Krai, Russian SFSR, Soviet Union
- Died: 3 April 2019 (aged 68); Ulaanbaatar, Mongolia
- Occupation: actor
- Years active: 1982–2019
- Spouse: Lyudmila Buldakova (m. 1993)
- Children: 1

Aleksey Ivanovich Buldakov PAR (Russian: Алексе́й Ива́нович Булдако́в) (26 March 1951 – 3 April 2019) was a Soviet and Russian movie actor.

== Selected filmography ==
- Through the Fire (1982) as Savely
- Believe It or Not (1983) as soldier
- Confrontation (1985) as director of taxi company
- Moonzund (1987) as Portnyagin
- All Costs Paid (1988) as Khramov
- The Guard (1990) as Paromov
- Mother (1990) as Stepan Somov
- Shirli-Myrli (1995) as commander of the An-124 crew
- Za co? (1995) as captain
- I, a Russian soldier (1995) as sergeant
- Peculiarities of the National Hunt (1995) as General Ivolgin
- Hello, Fools! (1996) as foreman from Ukraine
- Operation Happy New Year (1996) as General Ivolgin
- Queen Margot (1996) as judge
- Peculiarities of the National Fishing (1998) as General Ivolgin
- Peculiarities of the National Hunt in Winter Season (2000) as General Ivolgin
- Peculiarities of National Politics (2003) as General Ivolgin
- The Tulse Luper Suitcases: From Sark to the Finish (2003) as Colonel Kotchef
- Hitler Goes Kaput! (2008) as Kuzmich
- Burnt by the Sun 2 (2010) as Semyon Budyonny
