= Viktor Bychkov (actor) =

Russian actor

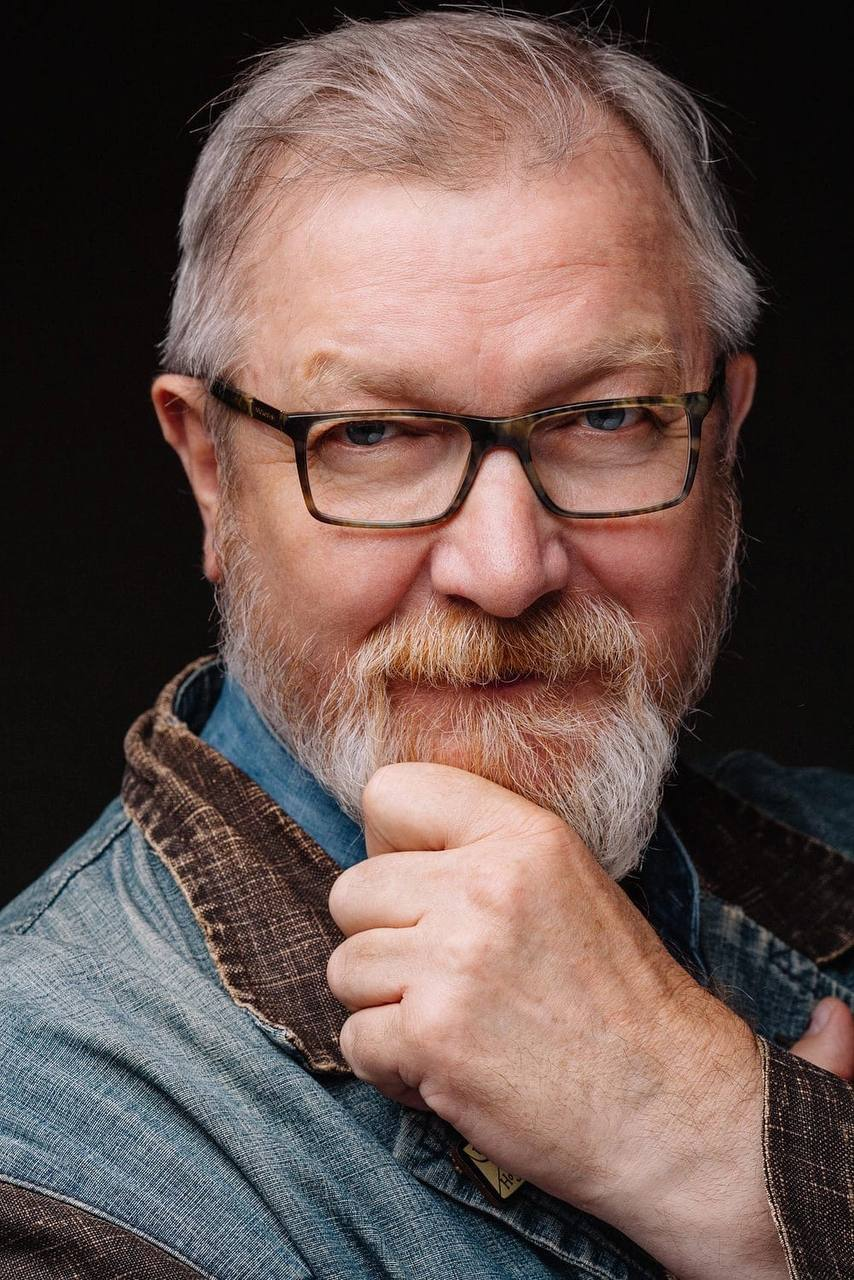
Bychkov in 2019

Viktor Nikolayevich Bychkov (Russian: Виктор Николаевич Бычков; born 4 September 1954) is a Russian actor. He won a 2002 Golden Eagle Award and a 2004 State Prize of the Russian Federation.

== Biography ==
Bychkov was born on September 4, 1954, in Leningrad. He grew up in a large 8-rooms communal apartment, where the population was forty. From childhood, Bychkov dreamed of becoming an actor. He played his first role in the summer camp. In his youth, Bychkov went to drama school, where he played the main role. He served in the Soviet army. He studied at the Leningrad State Institute of Theatre, Music and Cinema (teacher Igor Vladimirov), he graduated in 1982.

His first film part was in The Last Escape (1980) by Leonid Menaker.

From 2006 to 2012 he led the children's television program Spokoynoy nochi, malyshi! He was replaced by pop singer Dmitry Malikov in 2012.

== Selected filmography ==
=== Film ===
- The Last Escape (1980)
- For the Sake of a Few Lines (1985)
- The commandant of Pushkin (1986)
- The Left-Hander (1986)
- The life of Klim Samgin (1987)
- Miss Millionaire (1988)
- Cyrano de Bergerac (1989)
- It (1989)
- Dogs' Feast (1990)
- Spirit Day (1990)
- Afghan Breakdown (1990)
- Get Thee Out (1991)
- Chicha (1991)
- Comrade Chkalov Crosses the North Pole (1991)
- Act, Manya! (1991)
- Music for December (1995)
- Peculiarities of the National Hunt (1995)
- Operation Happy New Year (1996)
- Peculiarities of the National Fishing (1998)
- Women's Property (1999)
- Peculiarities of the Russian Bath (1999)
- Peculiarities of the National Hunt in Winter Season (2000)
- The Cuckoo (2002)
- Four tanker and a dog (2004)
- The Fall of the Empire (2005)
- The Turkish Gambit (2005)
- Dead Man's Bluff (2005)
- Home, Sweet Home (2008)
- 12 months (2013)
- Viy (2014)

=== TV ===
- Deadly Force (2000-2006)
