= The Fall of the Empire =

- Written by: Leonid Yuzefovich; Vladimir Khotinenko
- Directed by: Vladimir Khotinenko
- Starring: Aleksandr Baluev; Sergei Makovetsky; Maria Mironova; Chulpan Khamatova
- Country of origin: Russia
- Original language: Russian
- No. of episodes: 10

Production
- Running time: 520 min.

Original release
- Network: Channel One Russia
- Release: 2005 – 2005

The Fall of the Empire (Russian: Гибель империи, romanized: Gibel' imperii) is a Russian crime, thriller TV miniseries in ten episodes directed and co-written by Vladimir Khotinenko, broadcast in March 2005.

It is set in World War I, following Russian counterintelligence officer Sergei Pavlovich Kostin (Aleksandr Baluev), a veteran of the Russo-Japanese War, who works to uncover enemy plots aided by his sidekick Ivan Karlovich Shtol'ts (Marat Basharov).

== Cast ==
=== Main characters of the series ===
- Alexander Baluev as Captain of counterintelligence Sergei Pavlovich Kostin
- Sergei Makovetsky as Professor of Law, and then the captain of the Army Intelligence Alexander Mikhailovich Nesterovsky
- Maria Mironova as Elena Ivanovna Saburova
- Chulpan Khamatova as Olga Semenovna Nesterovskaya
- Marat Basharov as lieutenant counterintelligence Ivan Karlovich Stolz
- Andrey Krasko as non-commissioned counterintelligence officer Nikolai Alexeyevich Strelnikov

=== The real historical figures in the series ===
- Vladislav Galkin as head of counterintelligence Boris Nikitin
- Sergei Nikonenko as Paul von Rennenkampf
- Alexander Bashirov as Lavr Kornilov
- Fyodor Bondarchuk as Anton Denikin
- Dmitry Pevtsov as Nikolay Dukhonin
- Andrey Nevraev as Emperor Nicholas II
- Andrei Zibrov as Pavel Pereverzev
- Alexander Mezentsev as General Aleksei Brusilov
- Alexey Medvedev as Nikolai Krylenko
- Danil Lavrenov as Leonid Kannegisser
- Alexander Voitov as Moisei Uritsky
- Yuri Tsurilo as Yuri Steklov
- Valentina Kasyanova as Nadezhda Krupskaya
- Victor Smirnov as Colonel Moroz (prototype Viktor Klimenko)
- Mariya Poroshina as socialist revolutionary Maria Kovskaya (prototype Irina Kakhovskaya)
- Stanislav Nikolsky as Semyon Roshal
- Viktor Bychkov as Stepnin, also as Yakov Ganetsky
- Alexander Pashutin as General Grigoriev

=== Other characters ===
- Ivan Agafonov as janitor
- Sergey Astakhov as Karevsky
- Andrey Astrakhantsev as socialist revolutionary Leonid Charny
- Johan Bott as the German soldier Karl
- Gosha Kutsenko as Gibson
- Juozas Budraitis as Kranz
- Axel Buchholz as Stolberg
- Yuri Vasiliev as owner of the cinema "Lotos"
- Viktor Verzhbitsky as Ghanaian
- Sergei Garmash as Sakharov, the prophet "Kassandrov"
- Tatyana Dogileva as hostess of the apartment, Zina's mother
- Sergey Dreyden as Grohovsky
- Aleksei Kravchenko as Staff Captain Rysin
- Yevgeny Leonov-Gladyshev as socialist revolutionary Shilenko
- Alexander Lykov as filmmaker
- Dmitry Maryanov as Captain Bredel
- Darya Moroz as maid Katya
- Daniel Olbrychski as Strombakh
- Sergey Parshin as Ryabikov
- Alexander Pashkov as Mitya, driver (in 3rd and 6th episodes is named Pasha)
- Alexander Polovtsev as Antipov
- Ksenia Rappoport as Alina Gorskaya
- Igor Sklyar as Ricks
- Semyon Strugachyov as Franz Fleishman
- Glafira Tarkhanova as Tanya Zaitseva
- Mikhail Trukhin as Maletsky
- Dmitry Ulyanov as Stetsevich
- Nina Usatova as Zaitseva, Aunt Tanya
- Ville Haapasalo as Tarvilainen
- Konstantin Khabensky as Boris Sergeevich Lozovsky
- Vladimir Khotinenko as Colonel Yakubov
- Mikhail Porechenkov as captain with a white flag (finale of the 8th series, in titles is indicated as ensign)
- André Hennicke as employee of the German embassy, then captain of the German army intelligence Rigert
- Larissa Shakhvorostova as socialist revolutionary Kiseleva
- Dmitriy Shevchenko as socialist revolutionary Semchenko
- Justina Rudite as girl
- Alexander Rublev as soldier (in the episodes "Red Bows" and "Prayer Officer")
