= Andrey Krasko =

Russian actor (1957–2006)

- Андрей Краско
- Krasko in 2005
- Born: 10 August 1957; Leningrad, Russian SFSR, Soviet Union (now Saint Petersburg, Russia)
- Died: 4 July 2006 (aged 48); Ovidiopol, Ukraine
- Occupation: Actor
- Awards: Golden Eagle Award (2008)

Andrey Ivanovich Krasko (Russian: Андрей Иванович Краско; 10 August 1957 – 4 July 2006) was a Russian theatre and film actor.

Andrey Krasko first experienced theatrical production as a child at the Theater of Youth Creativity (1969–1974) directed by Matvey Dubrovin.

He was the son of Russian actor Ivan Krasko.

== Filmography ==
- 1979 — Personal Meeting
- 1986 — Breakthrough
- 1988 — Fountain
- 1989 — Stray Dogs
- 1989 — Don César de Bazan
- 1991 — Loch. The Winner of the Water
- 1991 — Afghan Breakdown
- 1993 — The White Horse
- 1996 — Operation Happy New Year
- 1997 — Brother
- 1998 — Peculiarities of the National Fishing
- 1998 — Checkpoint
- 1998 — National Security Agent (TV)
- 2000 — Peculiarities of the National Hunt in Winter Season
- 2001 — Sisters
- 2002 — Tycoon
- 2003 — Lines of Fate
- 2004 — 72 Meters
- 2004 — Goddess: How I fell in Love
- 2005 — Brezhnev
- 2005 — The Fall of the Empire (TV)
- 2005 — Yesenin (TV)
- 2005 — The 9th Company
- 2005 — Dead Man's Bluff
- 2005 — Graveyard Shift
- 2005 — Doctor Zhivago
- 2005 — The Turkish Gambit
- 2006 — The Storm Gate
- 2006 — The Orange Sky
- 2006 — Piter FM
- 2006 — Bastards
- 2006 — U.E.
- 2007 — Liquidation
- 2007 — I’m Staying
