= Peculiarities of the National Fishing =

- Directed by: Alexander Rogozhkin; Inna Gorlova
- Written by: Alexander Rogozhkin
- Produced by: Sergey Selyanov; Igor Kalenov
- Starring: Aleksei Buldakov; Victor Bychkov; Semyon Strugachyov; Sergey Russkin; Sergey Gusinsky; Vasily Domrachev; Alexey Sevastyanov; Andrey Krasko; Ville Haapasalo
- Cinematography: Valery Martinov
- Music by: Vladislav Panchenko
- Distributed by: STV Film Company
- Release date: November 1, 1998
- Running time: 95 minutes
- Country: Russia
- Language: Russian

Peculiarities of the National Fishing (Russian: Особенности национальной рыбалки, romanized: Osobennosti natsionalnoy rybalki) is a 1998 Russian comedy directed by Alexander Rogozhkin and Inna Gorlova.

== Plot ==
Several friends (General Ivolgin, huntsman Kuzmich and Leva Soloveychik) decide to spend their vacation fishing. Taking a large helping of vodka with them, they sail off, but quickly get lost. Finally reaching the shore, which they mistakenly believe is still Russia, but which in reality happens to be neighboring Finland, they get off the ship and spend some time on the shore, eventually falling asleep. Due to the effects of previously consumed alcohol, the friends manage to forget their supplies of vodka as they set sail once more. They now face the challenging task of getting back their belongings, which now happen to reside across the border in a different country.

== Series ==
This is the second film of the series (united by many of the common characters, although not necessarily with full continuity of content), which currently consists of four comedies, all of which explore the same theme but in different environment, which is reflected in the common first part of the name, Peculiarities of the National .... The first film is a 1995 comedy about hunting; the third is a 2000 comedy about hunting in winter time; the last is a 2003 comedy about politics.
