= Rudolf Furmanov =

Russian actor (1938–2021)

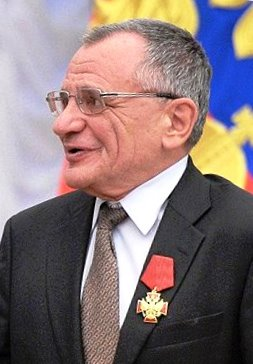
Furmanov in 2012, receiving the award of the Order "For Merit to the Fatherland", 4th class

Rudolf Davydovich Furmanov (Russian: Рудольф Давыдович Фурманов; 22 October 1938 – 9 April 2021) was a Russian actor and stage director. He was born in Leningrad, Soviet Union on 22 October 1938, the son of a worker at the Goznak factory.

== Biography ==
Furmanov's career began in 1948, eventually appearing in more than 80 film roles, and further appearances in television. Among them was Artyom in The Circus Burned Down, and the Clowns Have Gone (1998) and as Igor in I Want to Go to Prison (1998). In 1988 Furmanov founded the Andrei Mironov Theatre "Russian Entreprise" in Leningrad, and in 2008 he was awarded the title of People's Artist of Russia.

Furmanov died on 9 April 2021 in Saint Petersburg, Russia at the age of 82 from COVID-19. Governor of Saint Petersburg Alexander Beglov was among those offering tributes, stating that "Saint Petersburg culture has suffered a heavy loss."
