= Operation Happy New Year =

- DVD cover
- Directed by: Aleksandr Rogozhkin
- Written by: Aleksandr Rogozhkin
- Produced by: Sergei Selyanov; Igor Kalyonov; Tatiana Voronovich
- Starring: Alexey Buldakov; Sergei Makovetsky
- Cinematography: Andrey Zhegalov
- Music by: Vladislav Panchenko
- Release date: 1996
- Country: Russia
- Language: Russian

Operation Happy New Year (Russian: Операция „С новым годом!“, romanized: Operatsiya „S novym godom!“) is a 1996 Russian comedy film, a follow-up to the Peculiarities of National Hunt, directed by Aleksandr Rogozhkin.

Starring the film are Alexey Buldakov, Sergei Makovetsky, Leonid Yarmolnik, Andrey Krasko and Viktor Bychkov.

== Plot ==
On New Year's Eve, a diverse group of people end up in the trauma ward under various circumstances. Sergey Olegovich Savenko, a writer of erotic novels, arrives with both wrists broken after a failed bondage experiment. General Ivolgin injures himself while inspecting paratroopers, and a quarreling married couple is hospitalized after a car accident. A businessman with genital injuries and a dislocated jaw arrives after fleeing assassins, while Sergeant Semyonov brings in a detainee who swallowed a police medal. An actor and two brothers, the Kroupiers, are also admitted with fractures. They join two "permanent residents" of the ward: Poluyan, a drug addict with a twisted neck who scavenges for painkillers, and the "Incurable Patient," a nameless man in a wheelchair with an unknown illness, who always begins conversations with “Easy for you to say…” The patients receive visits from various eccentric characters, including Zoya, a secretary and lover of Savenko, as well as actor Kuzmichov, dressed as Father Frost. More bizarre visitors appear, such as a German-speaking Santa Claus, a drunken urology professor, and the mysterious Karl Ivanovich.

Displeased with the idea of celebrating New Year's in the hospital, the remaining doctor on duty, Evgeny Kachalov, initially holds back, but General Ivolgin takes charge of organizing the festivities. Female patients from a nearby ward are invited, a Christmas tree is dug up and decorated, and thanks to the businessman, a lavish spread of food and drinks is arranged. Poluyan is assigned the task of inviting prestigious guests. However, the festivities take a chaotic turn when the assassins targeting the businessman break into the hospital, only to be thwarted when the door to his room’s safe accidentally falls on them. The failed hitmen are admitted to the ward and connected to an IV of vodka instead of medication. Amid the celebration, the "Incurable Patient" tips over his wheelchair, breaking a finger, and the group decides to perform a spine surgery on him based on a satirical article they found in a science magazine. Despite being conducted by non-medics and heavily intoxicated, the operation is successful, with Zoya stitching "Happy New Year!" into his back. The following morning, it’s revealed that the "Incurable Patient" has miraculously regained his ability to walk. News reports later inform the patients that the Queen of England and the Pope have wished them a happy New Year, and Karl Ivanovich is revealed to be a guardian angel with wings hidden under his shirt. The film concludes with everyone joining in a celebratory song.

== See also ==
- List of films set around New Year
