= Andrei Kivinov =

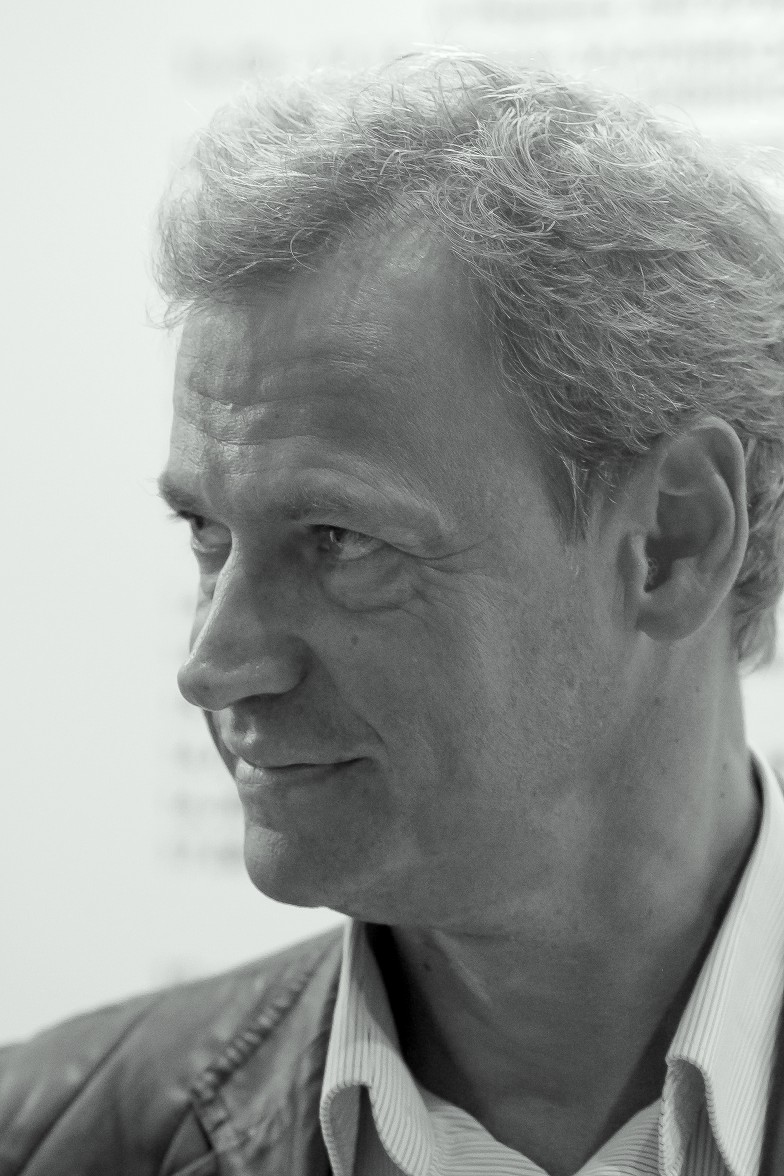
Andrei Kivinov

Andrei Vladimirovich Pimenov (Russian: Андрей Владимирович Пименов) – known professionally as Andrei Kivinov (Russian: Андрей Кивинов) – (born 25 November 1961) is a crime fiction author and screenwriter, writing in Russian.

== Biography ==
Kivinov was born in Leningrad, and grew up in the Krasnoselsky District. His father was a driver and his mother was a shop assistant – both have since retired. His childhood hobbies included hockey, soccer and reading adventure books. In high school, he developed an interest in rock music. Initially, he wanted to train as a teacher of Russian language and literature, but did not attain the necessary points. Instead, in 1979, he enrolled at the Leningrad Shipbuilding College. Three years later, he graduated and was offered a job at a Scientific Research Institute, working on shipbuilding technology projects. In parallel to this, he spent his evenings studying at the Leningrad Shipbuilding Institute. In 1986, after gaining a degree in Shipbuilding Engineering, he decided to change career path, and joined the police.

=== St Petersburg Police ("Militsiya") Service ===
Kivinov joined the Militsiya in 1986 as a security officer in the criminal investigation department. After graduating from the Interior Ministry's training course, he was assigned to the 64th Precinct of the Kirov District's Police Department. While there, serving as a Lieutenant of militsiya in the homicide division, he met the people who would later become the heroes of his future books. Kivinov went on to lead the homicide department, where he worked until 1998. He left the service with the rank of Major of militsiya. When he left, he was decorated with a medal for excellence in maintaining public order. He is currently a Lieutenant colonel in the reserve militsiya.

=== Career as an Author ===
Kivinov's first book – "A Nightmare on Strikes Street" ("Koshmar na Ulitse Stachek") – was written in his spare time for the amusement of his friends and colleagues. However, in 1994, it was published, and its popularity has resulted in it being reprinted twenty times.

Since 1994, he has published one book a year, with most of his works falling into the detective crime genre, although some of his novels do explore more lyrical and romantic themes. Some of his more popular works include, "Doomed Cop"("Ment Obrechennii"), "The Trail of the Boomerang"("Sled Bumeranga"), "Die Cast"("Umirat Podano"), "High Voltage"("Visokoe Napriazhenie") and "Saucer Full of Secrets"("Polnoe Bludse Sekretov"). More recently, he has been concentrating on novels in the thriller genre, such as "Pseudonym for the Hero"("Psevdonim dla Geroia"), "Black Gelding"("Chernii Merin") and "It's Hard to be Macho"("Trudno bit Macho"). In total, there are over 20 million copies of his books in circulation.

In 1995, Kivinov was accepted into the Writers Union of St Petersburg.

=== Films and TV ===
In 1995, the film company Russkoye Video began filming the TV series Streets of Broken Lights ("Ulitsi Razbitih Fonarei"), based on Kivinov's early novels and short stories. From 1998 to 2019, 16 seasons were broadcast.

In 1999, Kivinov worked on writing screen plays for the TV series "Deadly Force"("Uboynaia Sila"). This series went on for six seasons, a total of 60 episodes and was filmed in locations all over the world – (USA, South Africa, France and Estonia). This series achieved very high ratings, with one episode featuring the actor Gérard Depardieu.

The Russian TV Channel Channel One secured the film rights for Kivinov's six latest novels – "Black Gelding", "It's Hard to be Macho", "Maximum Security Holiday"("Kanikuli Strogogo Rezhima"), "Decoy"("Podsadnoi"), "Odnoklassnitsa.ru" and "Three Days Without Love"("Tri Dnia bez Lubvi"). "Maximum Security Holiday" was released in August 2009 with Russian box-office takings in excess of $17million. "Odnoklassnitsa.ru" was released in February 2010 as "Love under Cover" ("Lubov pod Prikritiem"). The others are planned for release in 2010–2011.

In addition to writing screenplays of his own works, Kivinov also wrote the screenplay for "Sorcerer's Dolls"("Kukli Kolduna") based on the book by his wife, novelist Victoria Sherwood.

== Awards ==
Winner of two TEFI awards (Russia National TV Prize for the highest achievements in the field of Television Arts and Sciences, established by the Fund "Academy of Russian Television") in the category "Best Russian TV Series"

Winner of "Nevsky Prospekt" award.

In 1999, he was given an award by the Interior Ministry for his accurate portrayal of the day-to-day workings of the Russian Police Force in his books.

Entered in the St Petersburg Book of Records as the creator of the longest running TV series in the history of Russian television for "Streets of Broken Lights".
