= Peculiarities of the National Hunt in Winter Season =

- Directed by: Aleksandr Rogozhkin
- Written by: Aleksandr Rogozhkin
- Produced by: Anatoly Maksimov; Konstantin Ernst
- Starring: Alexey Buldakov; Viktor Bychkov
- Cinematography: Yuri Shaigardanov
- Edited by: Yulia Rumyantseva
- Music by: Vladislav Panchenko
- Production companies: ORT; Ursus Film
- Release date: September 15, 2000
- Running time: 73 minutes
- Country: Russia
- Language: Russian

Peculiarities of the National Hunt in Winter Season (Russian: Особенности национальной охоты в зимний период, romanized: Osobennosti natsionalnoy okhoty v zimniy period) is a 2000 Russian comedy film.

== Plot ==
Kuzmich and Semyonov feel bored at the 13th cordon until the season of "checks" and "inspections" begins. The first inspectors are from the Ministry of Forestry, followed by two more from the environmental department. The heroes even have to drink tea for a while since the environmental leader is a teetotal lady who also hates hunting. Later, Leva Soloveichik and General Ivolgin join the company. As always the company survives a lot of absurd but completely legitimate adventures. The philosophical story-parable compiled by Kuzmich about the Chinese hunter Hu Zhou who comprehends all the secrets of Russian hunting and tries to understand the Russian soul, is carried throughout the storyline.

== Cast ==
- Alexey Buldakov — General Alexei Mikhailovich Ivolgin
- Viktor Bychkov — huntsman Kuzmich
- Sergei Gusinsky — militiaman Semyonov (voiced by Alexander Polovtsev)
- Semyon Strugachyov — Leva Soloveichik
- Irina Osnovina — Olga Valeryevna Maslyuk
- Andrey Fedortsov — Oleg Pyatakov
- Yury Kuznetsov — Kurtzov Yury Nikolaevich
- Andrei Zibrov — Rechnikov Igor Valentinovich
- Ivan Krasko — Vladimir Lenin (rescuer of the Ministry of Emergency Situations)
- Andrey Krasko — border guard at the Finnish border
- Mikhail Porechenkov — commander of the outpost on the Finnish border
