= Peculiarities of National Politics =

- Directed by: Dmitry Meskhiev; Yuri Konopkin
- Written by: Aleksandr Rogozhkin
- Produced by: Aleksandr Tyutrumov
- Starring: Alexey Buldakov; Viktor Bychkov; Sergei Gusinsky
- Cinematography: Sergei Machilsky
- Edited by: Tamara Lipartia
- Music by: Evgeny Fyodorov
- Production company: ATK Studio
- Release date: 2003
- Running time: 86 minutes
- Country: Russia
- Language: Russian

Peculiarities of National Politics (Russian: Особенности национальной политики, romanized: Osobennosti natsionalnoi politiki) is a 2003 comedy film directed by Dmitry Meskhiev and Yuri Konopkin.

== Plot ==
General Ivolgin is ready to go into big politics. High ratings of the unknown opponent confuse the competitors. They try to unravel the secret of the general's popularity and are taking steps to discredit him and even attempt to murder the general.

== Cast ==
- Alexey Buldakov – General Ivolgin
- Viktor Bychkov – Huntsman Kuzmich
- Sergei Gusinsky – Sergeant Semyonov
- Semyon Strugachov – Lyova Soloveychik
- Alexandr Tyutrumov – Kislyuk
- Nina Usatova – Inna Usman
- Sergei Russkin – Sergei Olegovich
- Alexandr Polovtsev – Ilyusha
- Viktor Sergeev – Viktor Sergeevich
- Mikhail Porechenkov – Vanya
- Yury Kuznetsov – Stepan Nikolaevich
- Anna Kovalchuk – TV host
- Konstantin Khabensky – Gosha
- Andrei Zibrov – Venya
- Mikhail Trukhin – Lyola

== Production ==
Director of the previous films in the Peculiarities of National... series, Aleksandr Rogozhkin, wrote the screenplay for the picture, but declined to direct. Dmitry Meskhiev was then chosen as director, but because of financial reasons the production was stalled and later Yuri Konopkin finished the picture

Most of the film was shot in Pskov
