= Streets of Broken Lights =

Russian detective drama television series

- Season 12 DVD cover (2012)
- Written by: Andrey Kivinov; Alexander Rogozhkin; Sergey Seyranyan; Kirill Kapitsa; Vitaly Aksyonov
- Directed by: Alexander Rogozhkin; Dmitry Svetozarov; Kirill Kapitsa
- Starring: Yury Kuznetsov; Alexander Polovtsev; Mikhail Truhin; Alexander Lykov; Alexey Nilov; Sergei Selin; Anastasia Melnikova; Leonid Kuravlyov; Yevgeny Dyatlov; Oskar Kuchera; Boris Cherdyntsev
- Country of origin: Russia
- Original language: Russian

Production
- Producer: Alexander Kapitsa

Original release
- Release: 4 January 1998 – June 2019

Related
- Deadly Force; Bandit Petersburg

Streets of Broken Lights (Russian: Улицы разбитых фонарей, romanized: Ulitsy razbitykh fonarey) is a Russian criminal drama-detective TV series anthology about police work in Saint-Petersburg. The pilot episode, known as Menty (Russian: Менты, literally "Cops") premiered in 1995, while the initial series ran for 16 nonconsecutive seasons from 1998 to 2019, with 500 episodes released overall and making it the longest crime series in Russia. The series eventually spun off another show, Deadly Force (2000—2005), that featured several characters from the original show.

== Plot ==
The main series recounts everyday life of a typical district police establishment in Saint-Petersburg, Russia. Police officers have to face uneasy duties, some must go undercover, while others do mostly forensic work. Streets of Broken Lights was inspired in part by a similar series called Petrovka-38, recounting everyday work of a similar unit in Moscow; in part by the blatant crime rate of the 1990s in Russia. Many fictitious cases presented in the show are based on real life cases having occurred during that dangerous period.

== Awards ==
- Grand Prix at the First Interstate (April 1999)
- Award TEFI in the nomination best TV show of the year (May 1999)
- Award TEFI in nomination best feature TV series (May 1999)

== Spin-offs ==
=== Main series ===
- Deadly Force (2000–2005)
- Chronicles of the Deadly Department (2004–2007)

=== Standalone film ===
- Insurers (2011)
