= Aleksandr Rogozhkin =

Russian film director and writer (1949–2021)

- Born: 3 October 1949; Leningrad, Soviet Union
- Died: 23 October 2021 (aged 72); Saint Petersburg, Russian Federation
- Occupations: Film director Screenwriter
- Years active: 1971–2012

Aleksandr Vladimirovich Rogozhkin (Russian: Алекса́ндр Влади́мирович Рого́жкин; 3 October 1949 – 23 October 2021) was a Russian film director and writer.

== Career ==
In 1990, Rogozhkin directed Karaul, which won the Alfred Bauer Prize at the 40th Berlin International Film Festival.

Rogozhkin's film The Chekist was screened in the Un Certain Regard section at the 1992 Cannes Film Festival.

Abroad, he is famous for his acclaimed 2002 film The Cuckoo (Kukushka), which won the Golden Eagle Award for Best Picture, Best Screenplay, Best Directing, and Best Feature Film. The film was also entered into the 24th Moscow International Film Festival where he won the award for Best Director. This film also received the Annual Best Film Award and Best Screenplay Award, both in 2002 in Moscow from the Guild of Historians of Cinema and Film Critics. It also won Best Feature Film and Best Directing for the Nika Awards in 2002, and it won Best Screenplay at the Honfleur Russian Film Festival in 2003 in Honfleur, France.

Rogozhkin was also one of the first filmmakers addressing the Chechen War with his 1998 Blokpost war drama.

Rogozhkin's most renowned television work are episodes of the Streets of Broken Lights – Russia's most popular police procedural TV series. He also directed the spin-off series Deadly Force.

He also directed a series of popular Russian-language screwball comedies Peculiarities of National...: Peculiarities of National Hunt (1995), Peculiarities of National Fishing (1998), Peculiarities of the National Hunt in Winter Season (2000), and Peculiarities of National Politics (2003). These were made in a similar vein together with Operation Happy New Year, containing much humor about alcohol-related adventures and stunts. It won the Nika Award for Best Film, Best Director, and Best Actor. It was nominated for the Nika award for Best Screenplay, and it was nominated for the Crystal Globe Award.

Rogozhkin's film Transit (Peregon) was released in 2006. It is a "wartime tragicomedy" about the relationship between Soviet soldiers in the Far Eastern outpost in Chukotka and the American female pilots who bring them U.S.-made airplanes from Alaska through the lend-lease program. As in The Cuckoo, Rogozhkin cast a number of amateur actors for Peregon.

== Personal life ==
His wife, Yulia Rumyantseva, a 42-year-old editor and film producer, committed suicide by jumping from a 14th floor elevation on 28 April 2011.

== Education ==
He graduated from Leningrad State University in 1972 with a degree in history and art critique. From 1974 to 1977, he worked as a painter and decorator for Lenfilm Studios. At the same time, he also studied in art and graphics at the Leningrad Pedagogical Institute. He then studied directing in the masterclass of Sergei Garasimov at the Gerasimov Institute of Cinematography from 1977 to 1981.

== Selected filmography ==
=== Films ===
- Brother has Come (1979)
- Redhead (1980)
- For the Sake of a Few Lines (1985)
- The Golden Button (1986)
- Miss Millionaire (1988)
- The Guard (1990)
- The Third Planet (1991)
- The Chekist (1992)
- Living With an Idiot (1993)
- Peculiarities of the National Hunt (1995)
- Operation Happy New Year (1996)
- Peculiarities of the National Fishing (1998)
- Checkpoint (1998)
- Peculiarities of the National Hunt in Winter Season (2000)
- The Cuckoo (2002)
- Peculiarities of National Politics (screenplay, 2003)
- Transit (2006)
- The Game (2008)
- The Question of Honour (2010)
- Aphrodites (2012)
- The Weapon (2012)

=== TV ===
- Streets of Broken Lights (1998–1999)
- Deadly Force (2000–2005)
