= List of Russian films of 2016 =

A list of films produced in Russia in 2016 (see 2016 in film).

== Film releases ==
Opening		Title	Russian title	Director	Cast	Genre	Details
J A N U A R Y	1	Ivan Tsarevich and the Gray Wolf 3	Иван Царевич и Серый волк 3	Darina Shmidt	Nikita Yefremov, Tatyana Bunina, Ivan Okhlobystin, Mikhail Boyarsky	Animation	Melnitsa Animation Studio
J A N U A R Y	1	Mafia: The Game of Survival	Мафия: Игра на выживание	Sarik Andreasyan	Viktor Verzhbitsky, Veniamin Smekhov, Yuriy Chursin	Action, science-fiction, thriller	
J A N U A R Y	1	The Milky Way	Млечный путь	Anna Matison	Sergey Bezrukov, Marina Aleksandrova, Anastasia Bezrukova	Comedy	
J A N U A R Y	21	Status: Free	Статус: Свободен	Pavel Ruminov	Danila Kozlovsky, Elizaveta Boyarskaya, Vladimir Seleznev	Comedy, romance	
F E B R U A R Y	18	Showdown in Manila	Разборка в Маниле	Mark Dacascos	Alexander Nevsky, Casper Van Dien, Cary-Hiroyuki Tagawa, Tia Carrere	Action	Russia-Philippines co-production
F E B R U A R Y	26	Friday	Пятница	Evgeniy Shelyakin	Danila Kozlovsky, Sergey Burunov, Anton Shagin	Comedy	
M A R C H	17	Kikoriki. Legend of the Golden Dragon	Смешарики. Легенда о золотом драконе	Denis Chernov	Vadim Bochanov, Anton Vinogradov, Mikhail Chernyak, Vladimir Postnikov	Animation	
M A R C H	31	The Heritage of Love	Герой	Yuriy Vasilev	Dima Bilan, Svetlana Ivanova, Aleksandr Baluev, Yulia Peresild	Action, drama, romance, war	
M A R C H	31	The Route Is Calculated	Маршрут построен	Oleg Assadulin	Pavel Chinaryov, Svetlana Ustinova, Vitaliya Korniyenko	Thriller, horror	

Opening		Title	Russian title	Director	Cast	Genre	Details
A P R I L	7	Pitch	Коробка	Eduard Bordukov	Sergey Romanovich, Sergey Podolny, Aleksandr Melnikov, Stasya Miloslavskaya	Sports drama	25th Floor Film
A P R I L	7	Hardcore	Хардкор	Ilya Naishuller	Sharlto Copley, Danila Kozlovsky, Haley Bennett, Tim Roth	Science-fiction	STXfilms; Executive producer: Timur Bekmambetov
A P R I L	21	Flight Crew	Экипаж	Nikolai Lebedev	Danila Kozlovsky, Vladimir Mashkov, Agnė Grudytė, Katerina Shpitsa, Sergey Shakurov	Disaster	Central Partnership; Loosely based on Air Crew. First IMAX movie shot in Russia.
A P R I L	28	Sheep and Wolves	Волки и овцы: бееезумное превращение	Andrey Galat, Maxim Volkov	Tom Felton, Ruby Rose, Jim Cummings, Rich Orlow	Animation	Wizart Animation
J U N E	9	Pure Art	Чистое искусство	Renat Davletyarov	Anna Chipovskaya, Pyotr Fyodorov, Konstantin Yushkevich, Ilya Lyubimov	Crime, mystery, thriller	

Opening		Title	Russian title	Director	Cast	Genre	Details
A U G U S T	25	Guardians of the Night	Ночные стражи	Emilis Velyvis	Ivan Yankovsky, Lyubov Aksyonova, Leonid Yarmolnik, Mikhail Evlanov	Action, fantasy, thriller	
S E P T E M B E R	8	The Monk and the Demon	Монах и бес	Nikolay Dostal	Timofey Tribuntsev	Comedy	
S E P T E M B E R	15	The Groom	Жених	Alexander Nezlobin	Sergei Svetlakov, Philippe Reinhardt, Olga Kartunkova	Comedy	
S E P T E M B E R	29	The Duelist	Дуэлянт	Aleksey Mizgirev	Pyotr Fyodorov, Vladimir Mashkov, Yulia Khlynina, Sergei Garmash, Yuri Kolokolnikov	Action, adventure, thriller, drama	Walt Disney Studios Sony Pictures Releasing

Opening		Title	Russian title	Director	Cast	Genre	Details
O C T O B E R	6	Collector	Коллектор	Alexey Krasovsky	Konstantin Khabensky	Drama	
O C T O B E R	13	The Student	Ученик	Kirill Serebrennikov	Pyotr Skvortsov, Viktoriya Isakova, Aleksandr Gorchilin	Drama	
O C T O B E R	13	Moscow, I tolerate You	Москва, я терплю тебя	Sergei Aksyonov	Ilya Ermolov, Evgeny Morozov, Nikolay Orlovsky, Lina Shishova	Comedy, drama, romance	
O C T O B E R	20	The Icebreaker	Ледокол	Nikolay Khomeriki	Pyotr Fyodorov, Sergei Puskepalis, Aleksandr Pal, Vitaliy Khaev, Alexey Barabash	Disaster	
N O V E M B E R	3	Versus	Молот	Nurbek Egen	Aleksey Chadov, Oksana Akinshina, Anton Shagin	Sports drama	
N O V E M B E R	10	The Good Boy	Хороший мальчик	Oksana Karas	Semyon Treskunov, Konstantin Khabensky, Mikhail Yefremov	Comedy	
N O V E M B E R	17	The Queen of Spades	Дама Пик	Pavel Lungin	Kseniya Rappoport, Ivan Yankovsky, Igor Mirkurbanov	Thriller	
N O V E M B E R	24	Elastico	Эластико	Mikhail Rashodnikov	Dmitriy Vlaskin, Irina Antonenko, Aleksei Maklakov	Drama, sport	
N O V E M B E R	24	Panfilov's 28 Men	Двадцать восемь панфиловцев	Kim Druzhinin, Andrey Shalopa	Aleksandr Ustyugov, Yakov Kucherevskiy, Azamat Nigmanov, Oleg Fyodorov, Aleksey Morozov	Historical, War	Universal Pictures International (UPI). Produced by Libyan Palette Studios. Based on Panfilov's Twenty-Eight Guardsmen, based on 8th Guards Rifle Division operations during Battle of Moscow.
N O V E M B E R	24	Zoology	Зоология	Ivan Tverdovsky	Natalya Pavlenkova, Masha Tokareva	Drama	
D E C E M B E R	1	Earthquake	Землетрясение	Sarik Andreasyan	Sebastien Sisak	Drama	
D E C E M B E R	22	Yolki 5	Ёлки 5	Timur Bekmambetov	Ivan Urgant, Sergey Svetlakov	Comedy	
D E C E M B E R	24	Santa Claus. Battle of the Magi	Дед Мороз. Битва Магов	Aleksandr Voytinskiy	Taisiya Vilkova, Nikita Volkov, Fyodor Bondarchuk, Aleksei Kravchenko, Egor Beroev	Christmas, fantasy, action	20th Century Fox CIS
D E C E M B E R	29	The Snow Queen 3: Fire and Ice	Снежная королева 3: Огонь и лёд	Aleksey Tsitsilin	Natalia Bystrova, Filipp Lebedev, Diomid Vinogradov, Olga Shorokhova, Nikolay Bystrov	Animation, Family	Wizart Animation
D E C E M B E R	29	Viking	Викинг	Andrei Kravchuk	Danila Kozlovsky, Aleksandra Bortich, Svetlana Khodchenkova, Igor Petrenko	Historical, war	Central Partnership; Based on the historical document Primary Chronicle and Icelandic Kings' sagas, and of the life of Vladimir the Great.

=== Culturally Russian films ===
- Despite the Falling Snow, a 2016 British Cold-War espionage film by Shamim Sarif

== See also ==
- 2016 in film
- 2016 in Russia
