= Moms (film) =

2012 anthology film

- Directed by: Yevgeny Abyzov (segment Parachute); Sarik Andreasyan (segment Father and son); Alan Badoev ( segment Partner); Dmitri Dyuzhev (segment My Beloved); Ashot Keshchyan (segment Mom, Put the Money); Tikhon Kornev (segment TV presenter); Karen Oganesyan (segment I am not Kolya); Eldar Salavatov (segment Operation Mom)
- Written by: Tikhon Kornev; Olga Antonova; Sarik Andreasyan; Alexey Nuzhny; Karen Hovhannisyan
- Produced by: George Malkov; Sarik Andreasyan; Ghevond Andreasyan
- Cinematography: Anton Zenkovich
- Music by: Alexander Ivanov; Darin Sysoev
- Production company: Enjoy Movies
- Release date: 1 March 2012
- Running time: 103 min
- Country: Russia
- Language: Russian

Moms (Russian: Мамы, romanized: Mamy) is a 2012 Russian anthology film. It consists of eight short films which are set on 8 March, the International Women's Day.

== Plot ==
Every year, on March 8, telephone networks of Russia transmit millions of calls and SMS messages. Hardworking analysts have calculated that the absolute majority of telephone calls are addressed to the most important women in the life of every man — mothers.

== Cast ==
- Elena Korikova — segment My Beloved
- Olga Volkova — segment My Beloved
- Yuliya Grishina — segment My Beloved
- Tatyana Kosmacheva — segment My Beloved
- Sergey Bezrukov — segment My Beloved
- Yekaterina Vasilyeva – segment I am not Kolya
- Alexandra Nazarova – segment I am not Kolya
- Mikhail Porechenkov – segment I am not Kolya
- Mikhail Gorevoy – segment I am not Kolya
- Marina Golub – segment Parachute
- Ekaterina Artemenko – segment Parachute
- Fyodor Dobronravov – segment Parachute
- Ivan Dobronravov – segment Parachute
- Liya Akhedzhakova – segment Partner
- Olga Makeeva – segment Partner
- Dmitri Dyuzhev – segment Partner
- Pyotr Fyodorov – segment Partner
- Ravshana Kurkova – segment Father and son
- Egor Beroev – segment Father and son
