= BadComedian =

Russian YouTuber (born 1991)

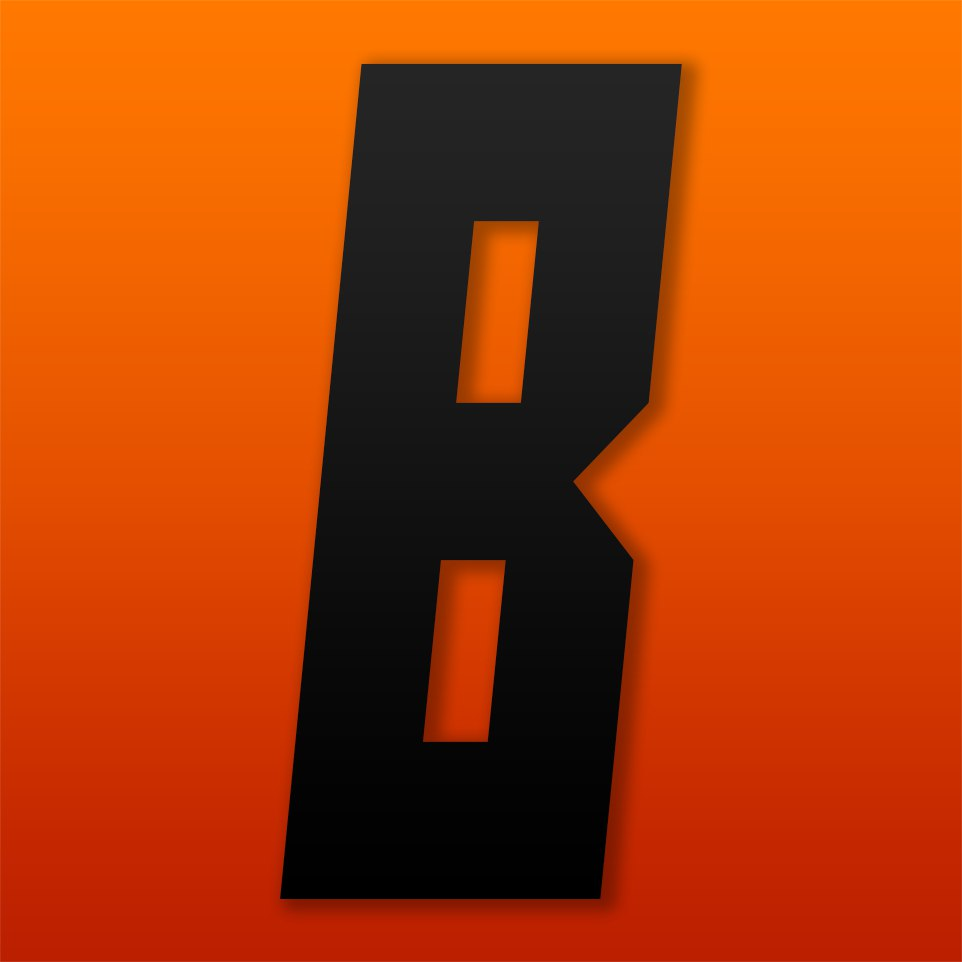
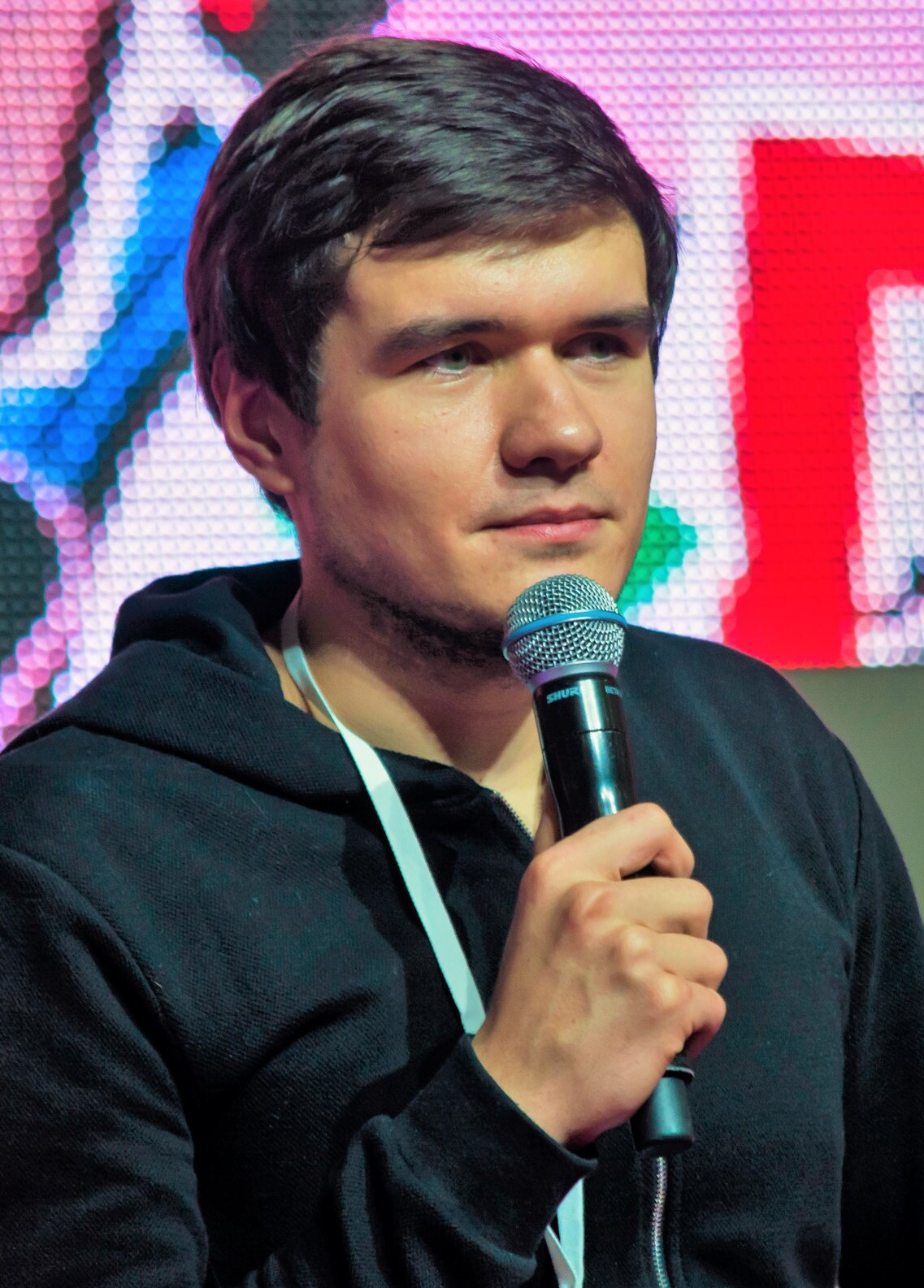
- BadComedian YouTube channel logo Evgeny Bazhenov on Vidfest 2016 in Moscow
- Born: Evgeny Vladimirovich Bazhenov; 24 May 1991 (age 35); Sterlitamak, Bashkortostan, Russian SFSR, Soviet Union

YouTube information
- Channel: TheBadComedian
- Years active: 2011–present
- Genres: Film criticism; comedy
- Subscribers: 6.03 million
- Views: 1.77 billion
- Last updated: 30 May 2026
- Website: thebadcomedian.ru

Evgeny Vladimirovich Bazhenov (Russian: Евге́ний Влади́мирович Баже́нов, IPA: [jɪvˈɡʲenʲɪj vlɐˈdʲimʲɪrəvʲɪdʑ bɐˈʐɛnəf]; born May 24, 1991), better known by his internet nickname BadComedian (or Evgen BadComedian, Russian: Евге́н BadComedian, IPA: [jɪvˈɡʲen]), is a Russian YouTube personality and film critic. He features in an eponymous YouTube channel where most of his reviews are uploaded.

Bazhenov makes critical reviews of Russian (and occasionally, American, Indian and Ukrainian) movies. His first review was uploaded on March 28, 2011. He also uploads positive reviews on a separate channel called EvgenComedian and used to collaborate with CarambaTV. Evgeny often criticizes comedy films directed by Zhora Kryzhovnikov, those released by Enjoy Movies company and various action films created by Alexander Nevsky. The BadTrip web series was released between 2015 and 2017, in which Evgeny Bazhenov travels around various locations in the United States which are related to famous films and TV series. He states that his works are inspired by Nostalgia Critic and The Spoony Experiment reviews. The nickname "BadComedian" is derived from the name of Comedian, a character from the Watchmen comic book and film, while "Bad" implies that Bazhenov himself thinks of his reviews as sarcastic rather than humorous.

Eurosport, RBK and Elle called BadComedian the main film critic of Russian YouTube.

== Biography ==
Evgeny Bazhenov was born 24 May 1991 in Sterlitamak, Bashkir Autonomous Soviet Socialist Republic. At the age of 12, he moved to Dedovsk with his parents. Currently he lives in Nakhabino, an urban-type settlement in Moscow Oblast.

In 2013, Evgeny graduated Russian State University of Trade and Economics, specifically the faculty of commerce and marketing. The theme of his graduation thesis was "Viral videos".

Between 2013—2014 and again in 2017, Bazhenov gave a stand-up performance tour. At the same time he hosted a show about stand-up ProStandUp, which was published at CarambaTV website. BadComedian appeared in cameo roles in the 2016 film Friday and the 2015 film Hardcore Henry. He was one of the voice actors for the Russian dub of Wish I Was Here, Tusk (2014), and Sausage Party (2016). Thanks to Bazhenov, Wish I Was Here was released in the Russian film distribution service. In gratitude for helping with the release of Wish I Was Here, the film's director Zach Braff offered Bazhenov the voice role of the film's protagonist in the Russian dub. In 2014, Bazhenov hosted a TV show "Heroes of the Internet" on Russian Peretz TV channel along with Maxim Golopolosov and Ivan Makarevich. He spent a year working as an editor for Vesti news on the Russia-24 TV channel.

Bazhenov stated that Yuri Bykov, Roman Karimov and Evgeny Shelyakin are among his favourite Russian movie directors.

== Reception ==
=== Reviews reception ===
Bazhenov stated that he has received legal threats from several sources, including actor Mikhail Galustyan, director Maxim Voronkov and actor and bodybuilder Alexander Nevsky, following reviews of their respective films. Alexander Nevsky called Bazhenov "a hater", while Mikhail Galustyan stated that he "offends persons, violates copyright and expresses unconstructive criticism". Other subjects have reacted more positively; rapper Basta praised the review of his film Gasholder, while singer Alexey Vorobyov liked the review of his film Treasures O.K.. Director Yuri Bykov stated that BadComedian's positive review of his movie The Fool had increased its popularity, and expressed graditude to the YouTuber.

Famous Russian translator and film critic Dmitry "Goblin" Puchkov called Bazhenov "merry and smart", noting his "surprisingly deep view of life according to his young age". Film critic Alex Exler marked the growth of BadComedian's creativity and praised his moderate use of obscene language.

One of the factors behind Bazhenov's popularity was the political overtones of his videos, which is why he is considered a "left-wing" YouTube blogger. In his reviews he criticized privatization in the 1990s and the consequences of the collapse of the USSR, the social policy of the Russian Federation, the cultural policy of the Russian government and the use of cinema for state propaganda, seeking to “protect the truth about the Soviet Union (and especially about the period of World War II) from excessive criticism”. In his Telegram channel in 2022, he blamed Mikhail Gorbachev and the party elites who dissolved the USSR for causing the Russian invasion of Ukraine.

=== Company of Heroes 2 controversy ===
In 2013, Bazhenov uploaded a review of the game Company of Heroes 2, calling it "a game created by Nazis". Bazhenov felt that the game developers disgraced the history of World War II by showing the USSR in a negative view, while Nazis, in contrast, were portrayed in much more sympathetic way. His review caused sales of the game in Russia to stop, while the English-language version of his review caused many arguments in the Western gaming community. The incident was highlighted on Polygon, GameSpot, and VideoGamer.com.

=== To Hack Bloggers ===
In 2017, Bazhenov published a devastating review of the film To Hack Bloggers, in which he heavily criticized the work of Gosfilmofond, a state-controlled foundation which has declared a goal of supporting the Russian cinema. BadComedian stated that To Hack Bloggers was extremely poorly made, calling Gosfilmofond's funding useless. This controversy had an impact in the Russian press; Russian Minister of Culture, Vladimir Medinsky, called the film "a creative failure", while Gosfilmofond's executives announced it would investigate budget spending. Bazelevs Company, the studio that created To Hack Bloggers, called BadComedian "an ill-wisher of Russian cinema".

=== Going Vertical review ===
On the night of 31 May 2018, BadComedian uploaded a highly negative review of the feature film Going Vertical, which revolved around the 1972 Olympic Men's Basketball Final and lasted longer than the actual film. The cause of his discontent was due to the filmmakers plagiarism of another sports drama film, Miracle (2004). In addition, the film distorted the real history of the basketball match and insulted the sportsmen's families. The review gathered over one million views overnight, causing Going Vertical’s ratings to plummet by 30 positions in KinoPoisk′s Top 250 Best Movies, eventually disappearing from the list. A week later, Evgeny uploaded a follow-up video in which he answered his critics and explained his fans′ actions. The video began with a shoutout to Yuri Kondrashin, the son of the late coach of the Soviet basketball team Vladimir Kondrashin (the Going Vertical′s protagonist), in which he thanked Bazhenov for "the rebuff to the slanderers".

== Filmography ==
=== Live action ===
Year	Title	Role
2015	Hardcore Henry	One of the cyborgs, cameo
2016	Friday	Cameo appearance
2024	Major Grom: The Game	Cameo appearance

=== Voice acting and dubbing ===
Year	Title	Role
2012	Ninja in Action	
2014	Wish I Was Here	Aidan Bloom
2014	Tusk	Teddy Craft
2016	Sausage Party	Gum

=== Video games ===
Year	Title	Role
2020	Cyberpunk 2077	Ted Fox
