= Soundtrack of Passion =

2009 film directed by Nikolai Lebedev

- Directed by: Nikolai Lebedev
- Screenplay by: Nikolay Lebedev; Leonid Porokhnya; Bakhyt Kilibaev; Sergei Livnyov; Vyacheslav Shmyrov
- Produced by: Nikolay Lebedev; Yevgeny Mironov; Ruben Dishdishyan; Irina Lebedeva
- Starring: Elena Nikolaeva; Fabio Fulco
- Cinematography: Irek Hartovich
- Edited by: Central Partnership
- Music by: Dmitry Rybnikov
- Distributed by: Central Partnership; ML-Studio
- Release date: August 25, 2009
- Running time: 97 minutes
- Country: Russia
- Language: Russian

Soundtrack of passion (Russian: Фонограмма страсти, romanized: Fonogramma strasti) is a 2009 romantic thriller film directed by Nikolai Lebedev.

== Plot ==
The film tells the story of the pursuit of love and freedom. Vita, employee of a private detective agency, falls in love with a tall blue-eyed stranger whom she met on an island located in the center of an expansive lake in a Moscow suburb. All-consuming passion arises between them. Blinded by it, Vita does not suspect that Adam is the man whom she wiretapped for her work and that soon she will have to eliminate him.

== Cast ==
- Elena Nikolaeva as Vita (voice Svetlana Ivanova)
- Fabio Fulco as Adam
- Sergei Garmash as Gennady
- Nina Usatova as Regina
- Anatoly Bely as Kosobutsky
- Olga Litvinova as Alya
- Nikolai Machulsky as Dmitry
- Svetlana Toma as Vita's Mama
- Nina Grebeshkova as Adam's neighbor
- Pyotr Dranga as waiter

== Awards ==
- Nika Award nomination for Best Sound Engineering (2010)
