= Jolly Fellows (2009 film) =

- Directed by: Felix Mikhailov
- Screenplay by: Felix Mikhailov
- Produced by: Felix Mikhailov; Sergei Kostygin; Aleksei Bokov
- Starring: Ville Haapasalo; Danila Kozlovsky; Ivan Nikolayev
- Cinematography: Gleb Teleshov
- Music by: Andrei Danilko
- Production companies: Survive Entertainment; Timeline Studio; Production agency BokovFactory
- Distributed by: Nashe Kino
- Release date: 13 October 2009
- Running time: 91 minutes
- Country: Russia
- Language: Russian
- Budget: $2 million
- Box office: $171 047

Jolly Fellows (Russian: Весельчаки, romanized: Veselchaki) is a 2009 comedy-drama film, feature film directorial debut of Felix Mikhailov. It was described as the first Russian film about drag queens.

It was screened at the 2010 Berlin International Film Festival, and also was the first Russian picture to be chosen as the opening film of the Panorama section at the festival.

== Plot ==
=== Overview ===
The action takes place in the late 1990s in Moscow, Russia. At the center of the film is the difficult fate of five men, performers of a drag revue, who meet at a restaurant after the dissolution of their creative troupe. They take turns to give an interview to a young journalist who, after being carried away by their interesting stories, permanently forgets the purpose of the conversation. Everyone has his own way of getting into a drag show, everyone has his own goals in life, everyone has his own destiny.

=== Characters ===
==== Lusya ====
Lusya is a young and determined guy who left his home in a remote village deep in the province to conquer the capital. Deciding that everyday life in Moscow did not live up to his expectations, Lusya decides to leave the show and return home to his mother. His colleagues from the show arrange a farewell concert, and in the morning, all five of them as their female alter-egos, put Lusya on the train, arranging an impromptu show at the station. Arriving in his native village, Lusya understands that there is nothing left from his former life. On his way home, he meets an old woman neighbor who tells him the latest news and offers him to stay at her place if he needs to. Suspecting something wrong, Lusya enters the house and sees his inebriated mother in the company of drinking companions. In the evening, Lusya meets a girl who was romantically interested in him but with whom their relationship did not work out. The girl, having learned that Lusya became an artist in Moscow, rushes at him with kisses. Lusya realizes that he must make a coming-out; in a pink suit, Lusya arranges a mini-performance, the audience of which are local village old women and geese. Lusya collects his things and returns to Moscow at the time when the other participants of the drag show are about to give an interview to the reporter woman.

==== Rosa ====
A mature man who is trying to come to grips with his relationship concerning his ex-wife and daughter. Owns the club in which the other characters of the film perform. Rosa lives on two fronts and tries to provide his daughter proper attention, but she constantly complains that he spends too little time with her, dresses badly and looks like a "crazy man". Despite a sociable facade, Rosa is deeply lonely, which eventually ruins him. Rosa becomes acquainted with an attractive man in a romantic setting, falls for the gentleman act skillfully crafted by the new acquaintance, and ill-advisedly goes along with him to continue their socializing. This affair ends with the death of Rosa at the hands of this new acquaintance; for him the murder of Rosa becomes a kind of revenge for all homosexual humanity as in his early childhood he was raped by a pedophile maniac and since then he has had anger and desire to destroy homosexuals.

==== Gelya ====
A young boy, whose mother is a well-known Moscow dressmaker who makes costumes for the city's elite. Mother does not know about the passion of her son to wear women's dresses, to wear makeup and copy women's manners. Teenagers suspect Gelya of this interest and a tendency to homosexuality, and tease him in every way, sometimes they beat him and do nasty things to him. Gelya's patience ends, and he, disguised as a girl, goes to a nightclub where he seduces a young man who was the main one among the guys who spoiled his life. The next morning, the guy decides to boast to his friends about his romantic conquest, but the guys become surprised and start laughing at him. In bed, everyone sees Gelya without a woman's costume. In the end, Gelya becomes the youngest participant in the drag show and begins to perform regularly. Once a costume designer comes to their dressing room whom Gelya had never encountered before. Ironically, this costume designer is his own mother. They talk for a long time and as a result the mother accepts Gelya for what he is.

==== Fira ====
The soul of the show and one of the oldest participants in it. For a long time he lives with his boyfriend. At the end of the film, he receives a letter from his boyfriend, in which he confesses that he made a decision to leave home, because Fira is infected with HIV. Heartbroken, Fira decides not to show any emotion and continues on her way to the dacha, where the whole company decided to go on a weekend. Entering the supermarket, the cheerful four arrange another extravagant show.

==== Lara ====
The most unusual drag queen of all, who wears a women's costume only on the stage and nowhere else. His story began with during the student years when Lara had to play the role of a gypsy woman at a Komsomol concert and was dressed this way by the organizers. The leadership, who watched the ensemble's rehearsal, was indignant at the performance, especially with the choice of music and Lara was even reprimanded for it. However, this meeting ended in an unexpected way, the talk continued in the apartment of the leader, who suddenly appeared in a female guise. But the encounter ended in a heart attack, and as a result the Komsomol leader's career broke down because the ambulance took him away in a woman's dress.

== Cast ==
- Ville Haapasalo as Rosa (Rosolinda Stein), Robert
- Danila Kozlovsky as Lusya (Lyusya Mohnataya), Dima
- Ivan Nikolayev as Gelya (Gertrude Moscow), Gene
- Pavel Bryun as Lara (Lara Conti), Alexey Viktorovich Gusev
- Alexey Klimushkin as Fira (Felomena Bezrodnaya)
- Renata Litvinova as Yevgenia, wife of Rosa
- Ingeborga Dapkunaite as Margot, mother of Gena
- Alyona Babenko as Alvetochka, journalist of the publication City News
- Yevgenia Dobrovolskaya as Valentina, mother of Lusya
- Mariya Shalayeva as Sasha, daughter of Rosa
- Alexey Mokhov as Ponomarin
- Sergei Brun as Alexei Gusev (Lara in his youth)
- Andrey Rudensky as Gosha

== Production ==
The idea for the film was born from real stories of drag artists, with whom the director Felix Mikhailov met in a nightclub. It took ten years for the project to be realized because LGBT related films are rarely produced in Russia.

When working on his role, Danila Kozlovsky observed a strict diet and carefully studied documentary recordings of drag shows and rehearsals with the director of the picture.

When the entire film was almost finished, but it seemed that there was still something missing, Alyona Babenko was hired for the role of a journalist who interviews the performers.

Renata Litvinova gave some advice concerning the screenplay to the director.
