= Alexander Loye =

Aleksandr Loye
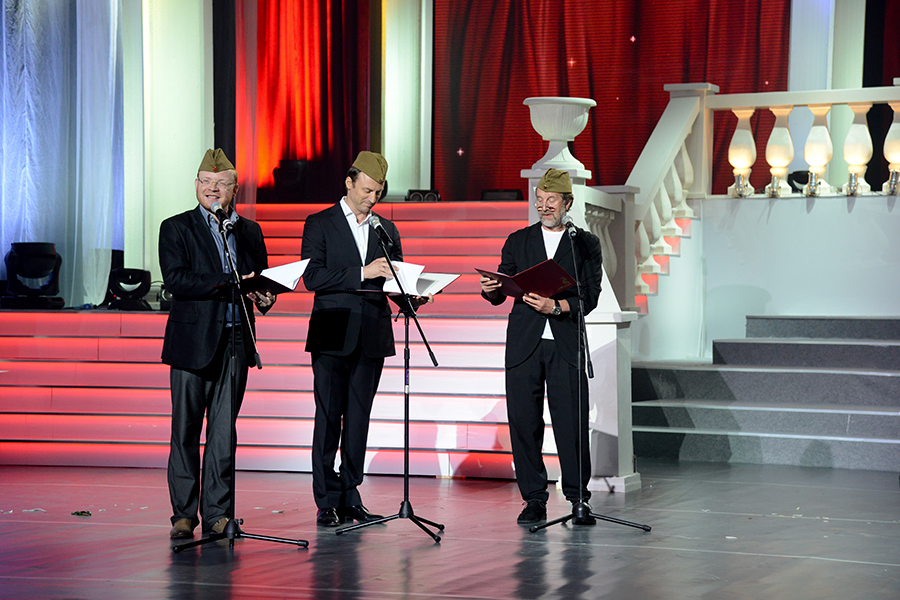
- Loye (left) in 2015
- Born: 26 July 1983 (age 43); Moscow, RSFSR, USSR
- Occupation: Actor
- Years active: 1988–present

Aleksandr Vitalyevich "Sasha" Loye (Russian: Алeксандp Витальeвич Лойe; born 26 July 1983) is a Soviet and Russian film and theater actor.

== Biography ==
By his own admission, he inherited his surname and hair color from his great-grandfather, Ernst Loë, an ethnic German who settled in Russia. He became known in the early 1990s, thanks to a number of commercials and his participation on a children's TV show Yeralash (where he worked from 1990 to 1995).

Since 2004 — the director of television. He graduated from the Shchepkin Theatre School (2006).

== Awards ==
- 2014: XV International TV and Cinema Forum Together — special prize for a vivid embodiment of the on-screen images of our contemporaries

== Filmography ==
- 1988 The Noble Robber Vladimir Dubrovsky as boy in the estate of Troyekurov
- 1989 Trant Ventoux as Arkanya Fedin, a friend and classmate Egor Tarantino
- 1990-1995 Yeralash (TV show)
- 1991 A Year of Good Child as Roma Rogov
- 1992 Eyes as Arthur, the patient
- 1992 Weather Is Good on Deribasovskaya, It Rains Again on Brighton Beach as Syoma, Monya's grandson
- 1993 Sny as boy buying photo
- 1993 The Lame Vnidut First as John Wesley, Mike's son
- 1997-2000 Adventure of Solnyshkin (TV Series) as Solnyshkin
- 2001 Next (TV Series) as Fyodor "Fedya" Rozgin
- 2002 Next 2 (TV Series) as Fyodor "Fedya" Rozgin
- 2003 Next 3 (TV Series) as Fyodor "Fedya" Rozgin
- 2007 Storm Gate Young Wolfhound (TV Series) as sergeant Goldin
- 2007 Young Wolfhound (TV Series) as Stinky
- 2008 Kiss Not For the Press as Alyosha
- 2009 Next Salamander as Biker
- 2009 Snow on the Head as Igor
- 2010 Love in the Big City 2 as assistant duty officer for internal affairs
- 2010 Escape (TV Series) as Sergey Novikov
- 2011 Five Brides as Captain Ivan Mazaev
- 2011 White Crow (TV Series) as Larion Veber
- 2013 Apofegey as Yura Ivanushkin
- 2015 Orlova and Alexandrov (TV Series) as Yevgeny Petrov
- 2024 Operation Carpathians (TV Series) as Chuma
- 2024 Chelyuskin. The First (TV series) as radio operator Ernst Krenkel
