= Actresses (TV series) =

- Genre: Drama
- Written by: Paulina Andreeva
- Directed by: Fyodor Bondarchuk
- Music by: Igor Vdovin
- Country of origin: Russia
- No. of seasons: 1
- No. of episodes: 10

Production
- Producers: Valery Todorovsky; Vyacheslav Murugov; Sergey Bondarchuk; Aleksey Kiselev
- Cinematography: Yuri Nikogosov
- Running time: 35 minutes
- Production company: Studio Videoprokat

Original release
- Network: KinoPoisk; Wink
- Release: March 30 – April 27, 2023

Actresses (Актрисы) is a Russian drama television series directed by Fyodor Bondarchuk. The series premiered in 2023.

== Plot ==
The series is set in a fictional Moscow Main Drama Theatre and behind its scenes between 2014 and 2020. The story centers on three actresses—Polina, Elena, and Oksana. Over the course of three acts, into which the series is conditionally divided, each of them experiences highs and lows, overwhelming success and hopeless casting calls, fierce competition, envy, as well as betrayal by colleagues and loved ones.

== Cast ==
- Svetlana Khodchenkova as Polina, actress
- Elena Nikolayeva as Alena, actress
- Polina Pushkaruk as Oksana, actress
- Aleksey Makarov as Gera, actor
- Sergey Gilyov as Stepan, actor
- Pavel Popov as Kolya, actor
- Aleksey Guskov as Polina’s father
- Yevgeniya Dobrovolskaya as Kolya’s mother
- Andrey Fedortsov as Kolya’s father
- Lolita Milyavskaya as Olga Vladimirovna, theatre director
- Igor Zolotovitsky as Gennady Sergeyevich
- Aleksey Shevchenkov as Vyacheslav Yuryevich, artistic director
- Natalya Surkova as Lyuba, assistant director
- Anna Nevskaya as Larisa, agent
- Anna Snatkina as Lera Strelova, actress
- Roman Evdokimov as Ilya
- Anastasia Krasovskaya as Masha
- Andrey Nazimov as Kurabin, director
- Anton Rival as Michel, French director
- Olga Makeeva as Zhanna
- Pyotr Skvortsov as Vasya

== Production ==
Filming took place from July to October 2022 in Moscow and the Moscow Oblast. Theatre scenes were shot at the Moscow Art Theatre, which also served as the prototype for the “main drama theatre of the country” depicted in the series.

Specifically for the production, director Oleg Glushkov staged two plays—The Chorus of Beggars and Duck Hunting.
