= The Phobos =

- Directed by: Oleg Asadulin
- Written by: Aleksandr Shevtsov
- Produced by: Fyodor Bondarchuk; Dmitri Rudovskiy
- Starring: Pyotr Fyodorov; Timofey Karataev; Tatyana Kosmacheva; Agniya Kuznetsova; Renata Piotrovski; Alex Sparrow; Pyotr Tomashevskiy
- Cinematography: Alexander Burtsev
- Music by: DJ Groove
- Production company: Art Pictures Studio
- Release date: March 25, 2010 (Russia)
- Running time: 100 minutes
- Country: Russia
- Language: Russian

The Phobos (Russian: Фобос. Клуб страха, romanized: Phobos. Klub strakha) is a 2010 Russian horror film directed by Oleg Asadulin.

== Plot ==
On a rainy summer day a group of young people go to a club called "Phobos", which is under construction and in the past used to be a bomb shelter. Suddenly all the club doors are automatically closed and the lights are switched off. Initially the characters perceive everything as a joke but later realize that they are trapped: their cell phones do not work and they did not tell anyone about their intention to go to this club. The goth girl Vika says that there is a creature that feeds on their fears and that they need to overcome their own feelings of fright.

== Cast ==
- Pyotr Fyodorov as Mike
- Timofey Karataev as Alexander
- Alex Sparrow as Zhenya
- Tatyana Kosmacheva as Yulia
- Agniya Kuznetsova as Vika
- Renata Piotrovski as Ira
- Pyotr Tomashevskiy as Roman
