= Oleg Asadulin =

Russian film director, screenwriter and producer

- Born: Oleg Ravilievich Asadulin; October 5, 1971 (age 53); Chelyabinsk, Soviet Union (now Russia)
- Citizenship: Russian Federation
- Occupation(s): film director, screenwriter, producer

Oleg Ravilievich Asadulin (Russian: Оле́г Рави́льевич Асаду́лин; born October 5, 1971) is a Russian film director, screenwriter and producer.

== Biography ==
Oleg was born in Chelyabinsk. There he studied at an art school, and at the age of 19 he went to St. Petersburg, where he entered the Mukhinsky school. In the 90s, Oleg moved to Germany and worked there as an artist, he built sets for various films. There, in Germany, Oleg received a director's education. Namely at the Deutsche Film- und Fernsehakademie Berlin. In the 2000s, he returned to Russia, where he directed films and TV series.

== Filmography (selected) ==
- The Phobos (2010)
- Green Carriage (2015)
- The Route Is Calculated (2016)
- Deadly Illusions (2020)
- Rolls (2022)
