= Alyona Babenko =

Russian actress

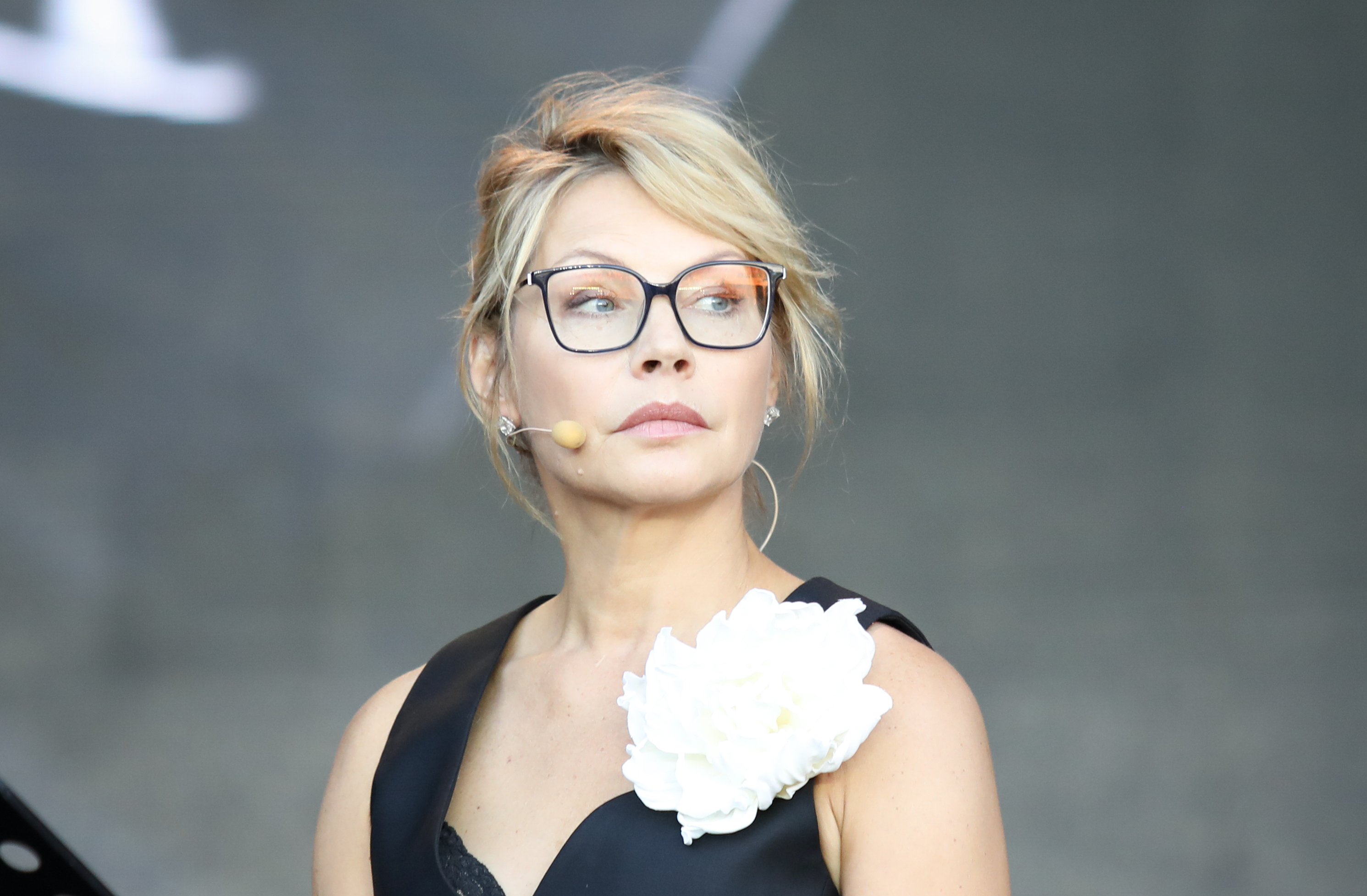
- Babenko in 2024
- Born: Elena Olegovna Baranova; 31 March 1972 (age 54); Kemerovo, RSFSR, USSR
- Other name: Alyona
- Education: Gerasimov Institute of Cinematography
- Occupation: Actress
- Years active: 1998–present
- Spouses: Vitaliy Babenko (divorced): Eduard Suboch
- Children: 1 (with Vitaliy)

Alyona Olegovna Babenko (née Elena Olegovna Baranova; Russian: Алёна Оле́говна Бабе́нко; born March 31, 1972) is a Russian film and theater actress, Honored Artist of the Russian Federation (2013).

== Biography ==
Elena Baranova, known professionally as Alyona Babenko was born in Kemerovo, Russian SFSR, Soviet Union (now Russia).

Mother — piano teacher, father Oleg Baranov — an engineer by training. In her childhood she studied in clubs and studios, went to a music school. She participated in festivals, performances and sang in the choir, in the vocal-instrumental ensemble. She dreamed of becoming a ballerina.

Was a fan of the French singer Edith Piaf.

Alyona graduated from school in 1988 and entered Tomsk State University in the Faculty of Applied Mathematics and Cybernetics. In her first year, Lena, by announcement, got into the Student Theater of Variety Miniatures. Amateur activities completely enticed her, and for the rest she practically did not have time. After the first course, she tried to enter the Moscow Art Theater to Oleg Tabakov, but failed. In her fifth year, Alena met Vitaly Babenko, a famous television director in Moscow. Alyona left the university and came to live in Moscow. Soon Alyona married Vitaly, and they had a son, Nikita. In Moscow, Alyona kept housekeeping, raised her son. In 2000, Alyona Babenko graduated from VGIK, the course was led by Anatoli Romashin.

Before finishing VGIK, Alyona made her debut in the TV series Kamenskaya, where she starred in several episodes. Best known for starring in Pavel Chukhrai's film A Driver for Vera (2004), who brought her the Russian film awards Nika and Golden Eagle.

She appeared in the second and third season of the ice show contest Ice Age.

In 2023 she became the host of the program Wait for Me on NTV.

== Personal life ==
First husband — Vitaliy Babenko, a Russian director and actor (divorced), son Nikita was born in 1992. She has a grandson Teodor.

Second husband (since 2011) — Eduard Suboch, master of sports in ski jumping from a springboard, businessman.

== Public position ==
In 2014, she signed a collective appeal of cultural figures of the Russian Federation in support of the policy of the President of the Russian Federation Vladimir Putin in Ukraine and in Crimea.

On 21 February 2022, Babenko was awarded the Order of Friendship.

== Selected filmography ==
- Kamenskaya as Katya (2000)
- A Driver for Vera as Vera Serova (2004)
- On Upper Maslovka as Nina (2006)
- Andersen. Life Without Love as Henriette Wulff / Alexandrine of Mecklenburg-Schwerin (2006)
- Indi as Arina (2007)
- Jolly Fellows as Alvetochka, journalist (2009)
- High Security Vacation as Tatyana Panteleeva (2009)
- The Photographer as Kolya's mother (2014)
- Flight Crew as Margarita (2016)
- After You're Gone as Chiara's mother (2017)
- Holiday as Margarita Voskresenskaya (2019)
- Doctor Richter as Margarita Bestaeva (2019)
- Vertinsky as Elena Pavlovna (2021)
