= Rolls (2022 film) =

- Directed by: Oleg Asadulin
- Written by: Mikhail Zubko; Konstantin Trofimov
- Produced by: Georgy Malkov; Egor Shorokhov; Konstantin Trofimov; Mikhail Zubko; Ksenia Bugrimova
- Starring: Kristina Asmus; Arseny Robak; Boris Dergachev; Mark Bogatyryov; Vasant Balan; Yuliya Topolnitskaya
- Cinematography: Yuri Kokoshkin
- Production companies: MEGOGO; Wow Oscar Studio
- Distributed by: KaroRental
- Release date: 2022
- Running time: 95 minutes
- Country: Russia
- Language: Russian
- Box office: ₽75.3 million; $1.2 million

Rolls (Russian: Булки, romanized: Bulki) is a 2022 Russian comedy film directed by Oleg Asadulin. The film tells about a girl who dreams of her own cafe and finds herself in Sri Lanka, deprived of money, documents and a spouse, but with a hangover and three guys who do not like her at all, played by Kristina Asmus.

Rolls is scheduled to be theatrically released in 2022, by KaroRental.

== Plot ==
Talented baker Tanya Babanina from Protvino near Moscow is a master in the kitchen and dreams of opening her own café. However, to achieve her dream, she must step out of her comfort zone. Tanya's journey takes her on an international adventure, leading her to Sri Lanka. There, she finds herself without money or documents, having just experienced betrayal from her husband immediately after their wedding. In a state of confusion and hangover, she unexpectedly ends up sharing a roof with three frustrated young men, complicating her situation even further.

== Cast ==
- Kristina Asmus as Tatiana "Tanya" Babanina, a baker / the second I am Tanya
- Arseny Robak as Boris "Borya" Romantsev, Tanya's fiancé after a divorce
- Boris Dergachev as Sasha
- Mark Bogatyryov as Kirill
- Vasant Balan as Raju, an Indian from entering the island
- Yuliya Topolnitskaya as Olya, Tanya's acquaintance
- Valentina Mazunina as Svetlana "Sveta", a female police officer, and Tanya's friend
- Tatyana Orlova as Elena Babanina, Tanya's mom
- Aleksandr Revenko as Igor, a business man

== Production ==
=== Casting ===
For example, one of the key actors Vasant Balan is a Russian comedian of the Indian descent who could not get a visa to go to Sri Lanka.

=== Filming ===
Principal photography for the project began in early March 2020 and took place in Sri Lanka. On March 12, after finishing the filming block, all the artists returned to Moscow. Six days later, Colombo Airport stopped operating all overseas flights due to the pandemic. The entire film crew did not have time to leave the island, in connection with this, the production of the film was temporarily suspended, as the team was under quarantine measures.

In the summer of 2021, it became known that the filming of the comedy in Sri Lanka had resumed. The film crew had to face a lot of unforeseen difficulties after a year and a half after a forced pause due to the pandemic.

== Release ==
The first teaser trailer of Rolls was released on November 19, 2021.
