= Maly Drama Theatre =

Coordinates: 59°56′N 30°21′E

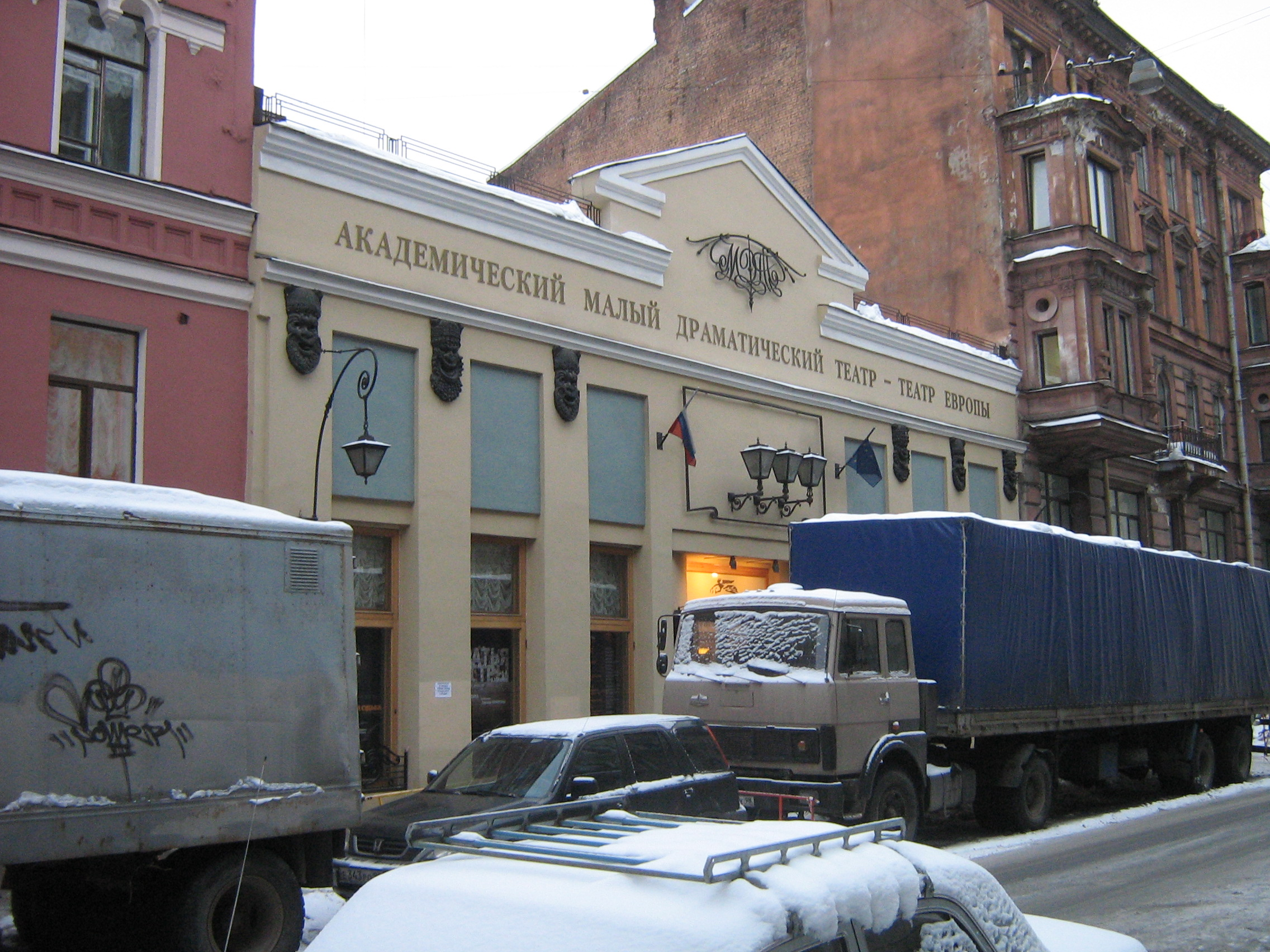
An image of Maly Drama Theatre

'Academic Maly Drama Theatre — Theatre of Europe (Russian: Академический Малый драматический театр — Театр Европы) is a theatre located on 191002, St. Petersburg, Rubinstein street, house, 18. The artistic director and head of the theatre is Lev Dodin.

== History ==
The Leningrad Regional Drama Theatre of Small Forms was created in Leningrad in 1944 by the decision of the Executive Committee of the Leningrad Regional Council of Working People's Deputies of September 9, 1944 No. 83. At first it was a traveling theatre and did not have its own building, and the theatre troupe gave performances in the towns and villages of the Leningrad region. Only in 1956 the theatre was allocated a building in Leningrad on Rubenstein street, house 18.

From 1944 to 1969, the director of the theatre was Evgeny Mikhailovich Kornblit.

From 1961 to 1966, the main director of the theatre was Yakov Semenovich Khamarmer.

From 1967 to 1970, the main director of the theatre was Vadim Sergeevich Golikov.

In 1973, the main director of the theatre was Efim Mikhailovich Padve. He staged the plays The Incident by N. Baer (1974), The Lord's Officers based on A. Kuprin's novel The Duel (1980), The Law of Eternity, based on the novel by N. Dumbadze (1981), The Fiesta based on the novel by E. Hemingway (1982), "Twenty Minutes with the Angel" by A. Vampilov (1983). In the theatre also staged performances of Lev Dodin - "The Robber" based on the play by K. Czapek, "Tattooed Rose" by T. Williams, "Live and Remember" based on the novel by V. Rasputin, "Appointment" by A. Volodin, "House" Abramova, Benjamin Filshtinsky - "Mumu", "The Son of the Regiment", E. Arie - "My Happiness" based on A. Chervinsky's play "The Paper Gramophone".

Since 1983, the main director, and since 2003, the artistic director - director of the theatre is Lev Dodin.

In different years, the theatre staged performances by directors Yuri Dvorkin, Henrietta Janovskaya, Kama Ginkas, Lev Dodin.

In 1993, by the order of the Ministry of Culture of the Russian Federation of November 27, 1993, No. 663, the theatre received the honorary title "Academic".

In 1995, by order of the Ministry of Culture of the Leningrad Region from February 1, 1995, No. 10, the theatre was renamed the State Institution "St. Petersburg State Academic Small Dramatic Theatre" of the Ministry of Culture of the Leningrad Region.

In 1998, by the decision of the Union of the Theatres of Europe, MDT was awarded the status of the Theatre of Europe.

In 2000, by order of the Culture Committee of the Government of the Leningrad Region of December 21, 2000, No. 116, the theatre was renamed the Leningrad Regional Cultural Institution "Academic Maly Drama Theatre - Theatre of Europe".

In 2003, by decree of the Government of the Russian Federation No. 1693-r of November 24, 2003, the theatre was transformed into the Federal State Cultural Institution "Academic Small Drama Theatre - Theatre of Europe". The Ministry of Culture of the Russian Federation became the new founder.

Since 2011, the official name of the theatre is the Federal State Budget Educational Institution "Academic Maly Drama Theatre - Theatre of Europe".

== Troupe ==
- Natalia Akimova
- Vladimir Artyomov
- Elizaveta Boyarskaya
- Vera Bykova
- Alexander Bykovsky
- Elena Vasilyeva
- Sergey Vlasov
- Oleg Gayanov
- Svetlana Grigorieva
- Pavel Gryaznov
- Irina Demic
- Oleg Dmitriev
- Vladimir Zakhariev
- Alexey Zubarev
- Igor Ivanov
- Natalia Kalinina
- Catherine Cleopina
- Danila Kozlovsky
- Sergey Kozyrev
- Alexander Koshkaryov
- Liya Kuzmina
- Sergey Kuryshev
- Urshula Malka
- Sergey Martyenkov
- Angelica Nevolina
- Maria Nikiforova
- Stanislav Nikolsky
- Polina Prikhodko (Zhuravlyova)
- Bronislava Proskurnina
- Kseniya Rappoport
- Tatiana Rasskazova
- Ekaterina Reshetnikova
- Adrian of Rostov
- Daria Rumyantseva
- Oleg Ryazantsev
- Mikhail Samochko
- Vladimir Seleznev
- Natalia Sokolova
- Elena Solomonova
- Ekaterina Tarasova
- Stanislav Tkachenko
- Irina Tychinina
- Galina Filimonova
- Natalia Fomenko
- Igor Chernevich
- Tatiana Shestakova
