= BOOMERang =

- Directed by: Pyotr Buslov
- Written by: Vladimir Tsarenko; Pyotr Buslov
- Produced by: Tanya Statsman; Yelena Sever; Pyotr Buslov
- Starring: Dmitry Nagiyev; Timofey Tribuntsev; Vladimir Sychyov; Yelena Sever; Roman Madyanov; Svetlana Ustinova; Maksim Vitorgan; Andrey Khabarov
- Cinematography: Sergey Kozlov
- Production company: Kinokompaniya 'Sever'
- Release date: September 23, 2021
- Country: Russia
- Language: Russian

BOOMERang (Russian: БУМЕРанг) is a 2021 Russian crime comedy film directed by Pyotr Buslov. It is scheduled to be theatrically released on September 23, 2021.

== Plot ==
The film tells about Edik, a self-confident, rich and cruel owner of a pharmacy business and an unlucky painter who falls on Edik's car, trying to commit suicide. But a miracle happened, the painter survived and now he must somehow compensate for the damage.

== Cast ==
- Dmitry Nagiyev as Edik
- Timofey Tribuntsev as Petrovich
- Vladimir Sychyov as Tolyan
- Yelena Sever as Olya
- Roman Madyanov as the pastor
- Svetlana Ustinova as the blonde lady
- Maksim Vitorgan as Seryoga
- Andrey Khabarov
- Semyon Slepakov as the doctor
