= The Devil's Flower =

- Directed by: Ekaterina Grokhovskaya
- Written by: Ekaterina Grokhovskaya
- Produced by: Vladimir Polyakov (Executive Producer); Igor Zadorin; Dmitry Rybin; Aleksandr Revva
- Starring: Olga Khokhlova; Sergey Krapiventsev; Oleg Sukachenko
- Cinematography: Andrei Makarov; Sergei Dyshuk
- Music by: Evgeny Galperin
- Production company: ZG Film
- Distributed by: Karoprokat
- Release date: September 16, 2010
- Running time: 90 minutes
- Country: Russia
- Language: Russian
- Budget: $5 million
- Box office: $1 852 960

The Devil's Flower (Russian: Цветок дьявола, romanized: Tsvetok dyavola) is a 2010 Russian romantic fantasy film directed by Ekaterina Grokhovskaya.

== Plot ==
The main heroine of the picture Polina is pursued by strange dreams, in which she is invited to go through a living flower on the doors of an ancient castle. Trying to figure out what that means, Polina turns to her friend, fortune teller Nastya. Having visited together the archive of the local library, they steal an old book there, which contains a description of the story that Polina sees in her dreams. At the same time, some pages of the book are initially empty, with scenes from the dreams and life of Polina appearing on them as events unfold. The second character of Polina's dreams is a dark horseman, beckoning her to follow him through the flower, and whom she saw while awake in a forest.

At the same time, Polina meets with engineer Sasha and tells him about her disturbing dreams. Their relationship develops and when they have a disagreement, Polina, wandering around the city, meets the man who was the dark horseman in her dreams. She sits down in his car and goes with him to that castle. At the spot, the man gives her a white dress which she should change into and places her on the altar with the intention of serving her as a human sacrifice.

Sasha, who is asked for help by fortune teller Nastya, manages to notice how Polina leaves with a stranger and follows them by taxi. After getting into the castle, Sasha fights against the man in black, and as a result he manages at first to gouge the stranger's eye and then to drop the adversary from an extreme height with him plunging into the surrounding stakes. As soon as the heart of the black rider is pierced by the stakes, Polina picks herself up but loses control and almost falls down to the defeated rider, but Sasha succeeds in the last moment to grab her and draw her back to safety.

== Cast ==
- Olga Khokhlova — Polina
- Sergey Krapiventsev — Sasha
- Oleg Sukachenko — dark horseman
- Irina Kupchenko — Polina's mother
- Natalya Naumova — Nastya
- Natalia Rudova — girl from the party
- Anna Emelyanova — girl from the party
- Marina Golub
- Andrey Kharitonov
- Roman Pakhomov

== Production ==
Filming was mainly conducted in Moscow and the final scenes were shot in a medieval castle in Poland.

== Release and reception ==
The film was unsuccessful with the critics and at the box-office.
