= Holiday (2019 film) =

- Directed by: Alexey Krasovsky
- Screenplay by: Alexey Krasovsky
- Produced by: Alexey Krasovsky; Julia Kryshtofovich
- Starring: Yan Tsapnik; Alyona Babenko; Timofey Tribuntsev
- Cinematography: Sergey Astakhov
- Edited by: Vladimir Zimin; Alexey Krasovsky
- Music by: Ruslan Lepatov
- Release date: January 3, 2019
- Running time: 73 min.
- Country: Russia
- Language: Russian
- Budget: $100,000

Holiday (Russian: Праздник, romanized: Prazdnik) is a 2019 Russian comedy film written and directed by Alexey Krasovsky.

Initially the premiere of the film was scheduled to take place on December 31, 2018, on the personal YouTube channel of the director. But after the Magnitogorsk apartment block collapse, which left multiple victims, the release was postponed to January 3, 2019.

== Plot ==
The Voskresensky family is on special security in late 1941, and despite the Siege of Leningrad is not starving. Since the head of the family, the scientist Georgy Voskresensky, fulfills an important government task, the family's place of residence is a secret. Until recently they were served by a cook, but on the eve of the film's action the cook has been taken away. The family is going to celebrate the new year of 1942 in their country house. They have a raw chicken, but there is no one to cook it. Denis, the younger son of Voskresensky, invites a hungry girl, Masha, to their celebration. Liza, the eldest daughter, invites a man, Vitaly, whom she says she is about to marry. The family must first hide their wealth from the guests, and then enter into some kind of agreement with them.

== Cast ==
Anfisa Chernykh, Alyona Babenko, Yan Tsapnik as Voskresensky's family

- Yan Tsapnik as Georgy Voskresensky
- Alyona Babenko as Margarita Voskresenskaya, Georgy's wife
- Pavel Tabakov as Denis
- Anfisa Chernykh as Liza
- Timofey Tribuntsev as Vitaly
- Asya Chistyakova as Masha
- Yekaterina Gatalskaya as grandmother

== Controversy ==
Despite the fact that fundraising on a crowdfunding platform was completed on September 22, the media did not report anything about the film until October 12, 2018, when it was reported that film director Krasovsky was working on a new film, a black comedy about the Siege of Leningrad.

After the appearance of information in the media, a number of famous personalities immediately began to criticize the film, despite the fact that it had not yet been screened. Radio host Sergei Stillavin posted a post on Facebook in which he claimed that the authors of the film were treading on a sacred theme.

Video blogger Dmitry Puchkov released videos criticizing the film.

=== Attempted ban ===
State Duma deputy Sergey Boyarsky (son of actor Mikhail Boyarsky) called the picture blasphemy and promised to prevent it from being filmed. Andrey Turchak appealed to the Minister of Culture, Vladimir Medinsky, that under no circumstances should he issue a rental certificate for the film.

The media noted that if Holiday were not given a rolling ID, this would be the second time that a film comedy was banned in Russia, the first being The Death of Stalin.
