= A Driver for Vera =

2004 film directed by Pavel Chukhray

- Directed by: Pavel Chukhray
- Written by: Pavel Chukhray
- Produced by: Vitaly Koshman; Alexander Rodnyansky
- Starring: Igor Petrenko; Alyona Babenko; Bogdan Stupka; Marina Golub; Valery Barinov
- Cinematography: Igor Klebanov
- Edited by: Olga Grinshpun
- Music by: Eduard Artemyev
- Distributed by: Nashe Kino
- Release dates: 27 July 2004 (Russia); 12 August 2004 (Ukraine)
- Running time: 105 minutes
- Countries: Russia, Ukraine
- Language: Russian
- Budget: USD 3,300,000 (estimated)
- Box office: USD 2,011,837 (Russia), 22 August 2004

A Driver for Vera (Russian: «Водитель для Веры», romanized: Voditel dlya Very) is a 2004 Ukrainian-Russian co-produced psychological drama film from 2004, set in 1962 Sevastopol, Ukraine, directed and written by Russian Pavel Chukhray. The film won numerous Russian awards including Best Film at the Sochi Film Festival. The film's two-country origin resulted in the film being rejected as Ukraine's entry for the Academy Awards Best Foreign Film category for 2005, due to a rule which states, "[T]he submitting country must certify that creative talent of that country exercised artistic control of the film."

== Plot ==
During the Khrushchev Thaw in Soviet Crimea, Ukraine, a young cadet in the Red Army named Viktor (Igor Petrenko), becomes a chauffeur for a general (Bohdan Stupka). Viktor begins a relationship with the general's disabled and volatile daughter, Vera (Alyona Babenko). Viktor becomes involuntarily involved in a plot by the KGB whereby KGB agent Saveliev (Andrei Panin) pushes Viktor to spy on the general for KGB purposes. As the action develops around Viktor's relationship with Vera and his conflicted reasons for pursuing it, contrasted with the raw sexual tension between Viktor and the maid, Lida (Yekaterina Yudina), and her scathing attack on his motives rel Vera, the KGB, using Agent Saveliev, plots to take down and ultimately kill the general. Nobody is safe.

== Reception ==
After acknowledging, the film's numerous Russian awards, movie critic Ronnie Scheib nevertheless panned the film in entertainment magazine Variety opining, for example, "[The] pic[ture]'s oddly disjointed wedding of operatic emotionalism and cool aesthetic distance may prove more off-putting than enthralling."

== See also ==
- Cinema of Ukraine
- List of submissions to the 77th Academy Awards for Best Foreign Language Film
- List of Ukrainian submissions for the Academy Award for Best International Feature Film
