= Elena Nikolaeva (actress) =

Russian actress (born 1983)

- Елена Николаева
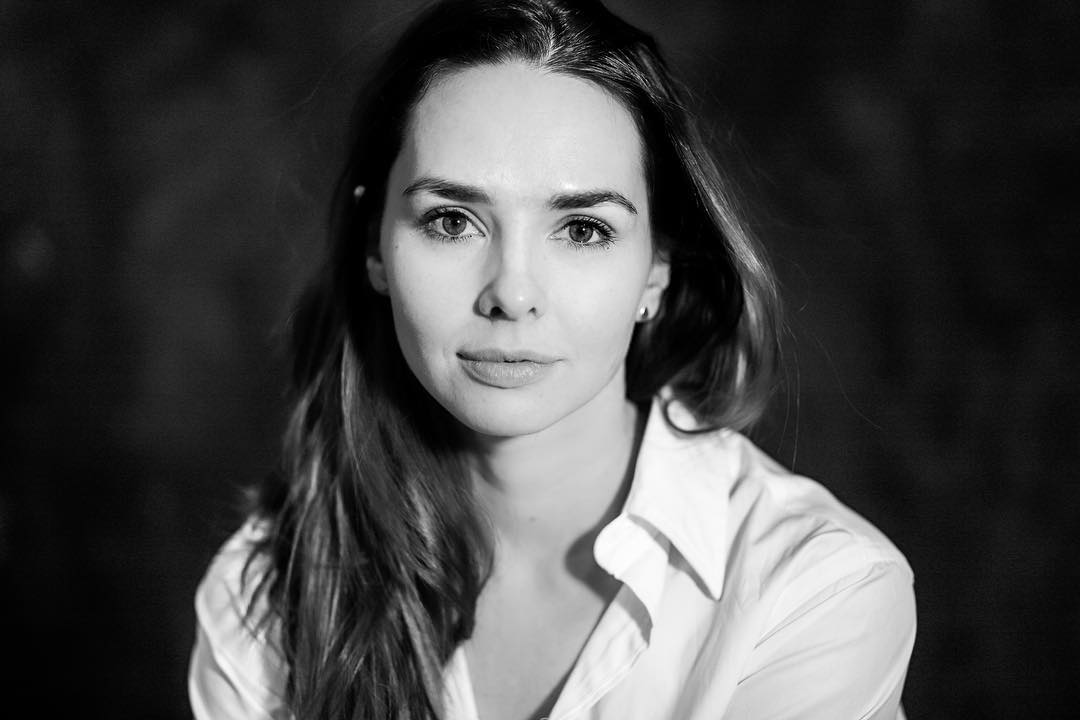
- Born: Elena Andreevna Nikolaeva; 9 February 1983 (age 43); Moscow, RSFSR, USSR
- Occupation: Actress
- Years active: 2003—present

Elena Andreevna Nikolaeva (Russian: Елена Андреевна Николаева, born 9 February 1983) is a Russian actress.

== Life and career ==
Elena Nikolaeva was born in Moscow, Russian SFSR, Soviet Union. She graduated from the Russian Academy of Theatre Arts in 2006. Currently, she works in the State Theatre of Nations.

=== Personal life ===
Elena is married and has a son and a daughter. She is Valentina Tereshkova's daughter.

== Filmography ==
- 2007 Roly-Poly Toy as Tanya
- 2007 Pen and Sword (TV Series) as Nastya
- 2008 Kazaki-Robbers (TV Mini-Series) as Sashka
- 2008 Girl (TV Movie) as Lena Yartseva
- 2009 Soundtrack of Passion as Vita
- 2009 I'll Be Back (TV Series) as Gulya
- 2012 Freud's Method (TV Series) as Lidiya Fadeeva
- 2012 While Blooming Fern (TV Series) as Olesya Murashova / Polina Murashova, twin sister of Olesya
- 2014 Two Winters and Three Summers (TV series) as Varvara Inyakhina
- 2023 Actresses (TV series) as Alena
- 2024 Ice 3 as Tamara Bezhanova
