= Marina Golub =

Russian actress

- Born: 8 December 1957; Moscow, Soviet Union
- Died: 9 October 2012 (aged 54); Moscow, Russia
- Occupation: Actress
- Years active: 1980–2012

Marina Grigorievna Golub (Russian: Марина Григорьевна Голуб; 8 December 1957 — 9 October 2012) was a Russian film, television and stage actress. She was most well known for her performances in Russian television programs Morning Mail, Ah, Semenovna, Girls, Travelling Naturalist.

Her father – GRU Colonel Grigori E. Golub (1923-2014), a former military intelligence officer, served as consul in Finland and her mother – actress Ludmila Golub, played in the Theater Gogol. Grandfather – Efim Samoilovich Golub, at one time was the People's Commissar of Finance of the Ukrainian SSR (arrested in 1937). In 1979 she graduated from the Moscow Art Theatre School. From 2002 to 2012 she played on stage in the Chekhov Moscow Art Theatre.

She died in Moscow on the night of 9 to 10 October 2012 in a road accident.

== Personal life ==
Marina Golub was married three times:

- Her first husband was businessman Yevgeny Troinin.
  - They had a daughter, Anastasia, who works at the WonderLoft production center from February 11, 2013, she became one of the hosts of talk show "Girls" on the Russia 1 channel, from March to July 2015 - director of the Gogol Center.
- Her second husband was actor Vadim Dolgachev, who worked in the Moscow theater "Complicity".
- Her third husband was Anatoliy Beliy, an actor of the Stanislavsky and Moscow Art Theater; they divorced after 11 years of marriage.

== Selected filmography ==
- The Youth of Peter the Great (1980)
- At the Beginning of Glorious Days (1980)
- Zone of Lyube (1994)
- Shirli-Myrli (1995)
- The Admirer (1999)
- In Motion (2002)
- The Burning Land (2003)
- The Wedding (2000)
- A Driver for Vera (2004)
- Poor Relatives (2005)
- Playing the Victim (2006)
- Wedding Ring (TV) (2008)
- The Devil's Flower (2010)
- Five Brides (2011)
- Moms (2012)
- Atomic Ivan (2012)

== Awards ==
- Honored Artist of the Russian Federation (1995) or achievements in the arts
- Order of Friendship (2008) for his great contribution in the development of national culture and art, and many years of fruitful activity
