= Five Brides =

- Film poster
- Russian: Пять невест
- Directed by: Karen Oganesyan
- Written by: Sergey Kaluzhanov; Yuriy Korotkov; Irina Pivovarova
- Produced by: Sergey Danielyan; Denis Frolov; Aram Movsesyan
- Starring: Danila Kozlovsky; Elizaveta Boyarskaya; Aleksey Dmitriev; Andrey Fedortsov; Marina Golub; Michael Gor
- Cinematography: Ilya Dyomin
- Edited by: Maxim Smirnov
- Music by: Ilya Dukhovny
- Release dates: June 2011 (Moscow); September 29, 2011
- Country: Russia
- Language: Russian

Five Brides (Russian: Пять невест, romanized: Pyat nevest) is a 2011 Russian comedy film directed by Karen Oganesyan.

== Plot ==
Set in the summer of 1945, shortly after the end of World War II, the film follows a group of fighter pilots, Vadik, Lyosha, Garik, Vanya, and Misha, who are struggling with boredom and longing to return to their homes. As their unit is unexpectedly ordered to stay in Germany, their hopes for a swift return are dashed, and the pilots slip into a state of near depression. In a desperate bid to cope, they simulate flights in an old gazebo, indulging in memories of their past lives. Amidst this gloom, news arrives that Lyosha is being assigned to a military factory in Smolensk, prompting Vadik to ask him to marry his girlfriend, Nastya Karpova, using his documents. What begins as a straightforward request soon spirals into an unexpected adventure when Lyosha discovers that almost all his friends want him to bring back brides for them, each handing over their identification and wedding rings. This convoluted plan sets off a chain of comedic misunderstandings and mishaps as Lyosha navigates his new role in a foreign land.

Upon his arrival in Smolensk, Lyosha receives a briefing from Major Vykhristyuk on how to interact with the locals, but things quickly go awry. He hitches a ride with Zoya Skvortsova, only to get stuck in the mud, leading to a series of misadventures where Zoya mistakenly believes Lyosha is a German spy and takes him to the local commandant. After narrowly escaping, Lyosha makes his way to Nastya's home, where he is mistaken for Vadik and drawn into a chaotic wedding celebration. Despite the comedic turmoil, including confrontations with village authorities and attempts to marry off his friends, Lyosha finds himself entangled in a web of lies and unexpected alliances. The climax unfolds at the airfield, where his identity as a bigamist is nearly exposed. In a humorous resolution, he marries Zoya on the hood of a truck, and the film concludes with the pilots reuniting with their long-lost wives against a backdrop of painted birch trees, humorously reflecting on the absurdity of their situation while paying homage to their grandparents.

== Cast ==
- Danila Kozlovsky as Aleksey Kaverin
- Elizaveta Boyarskaya as Zoya
- Aleksey Dmitriev as Egor
- Andrey Fedortsov as major Vykhristyuk
- Marina Golub as Galina
- Michael Gor as Kuzichev (as Mikhail Gorevoy)
- Artur Smolyaninov as Vadim Dobromyslov
- Svetlana Khodchenkova as Anastasia Karpova
- Khoren Levonyan as Garik Margaryan
- Aleksandr Loye as Ivan Mazaev
- Vladimir Yaglych as Mikhail Lomakin
- Irina Pegova as Lilya
- Yuliya Peresild as Asya; Katya
- Valery Zolotukhin as grandfather
- Igor Savochkin as Andrey
