= Status: Free =

- Directed by: Pavel Ruminov
- Screenplay by: Pavel Ruminov
- Produced by: Sergei Livnev; Danila Kozlovsky; Sergei Bobza
- Starring: Danila Kozlovsky; Elizaveta Boyarskaya
- Cinematography: Anton Drozdov
- Edited by: Aleksandr Ivanov; Pavel Ruminov
- Music by: Oleg Chubykin; Aleksandr Ivanov; Ivan Lubennikov
- Production company: Leopolis
- Release date: 21 January 2016
- Running time: 95 minutes
- Country: Russia
- Language: Russian
- Box office: $2 078 497

Status: Free (Russian: Статус: Свободен, romanized: Status: Svoboden) is a 2016 Russian romantic comedy directed by Pavel Ruminov.

== Plot ==
Stand-up-comedian Nikita Kolesnikov (Danila Kozlovsky) is having a difficult time breaking up with his girlfriend Afina Gordeeva (Elizaveta Boyarskaya), who found herself a more promising partner - a successful 40-year old dentist. Nikita, trying to cope with this, goes through different stages - hatred, attempts to return the former beloved, until he realizes that he should not be afraid of parting, and perhaps this is the best thing that happened in his life.

== Cast ==
- Danila Kozlovsky - Nikita Kolesnikov
- Elizaveta Boyarskaya - Afina Gordeeva
- Vladimir Seleznev - Alexei Yartsev, dentist
- Igor Voinarovsky - Vadik, friend of Nikita
- Natalia Anisimova - Valya Valley
- Paulina Andreeva - Sonya Shmul
- Mikhail Krylov - Krylov, producer
- Maria Starotorgskaya - lady at the corporate party
- Nadezhda Zvenigorodskaya - Nikita's mother
- Yulia Pak - colleague of Afina

== Remake ==
The film was remade in Lithuania by director Andrius Žiurauskas.
