= Agnė Grudytė =

Lithuanian actress and TV presenter (born 1986)

- Born: 9 July 1986 (age 39); Šiauliai, Lithuanian SSR, Soviet Union
- Citizenship: Lithuanian
- Occupation: Actress
- Years active: 2010–present
- Children: 1

Agnė Grudytė (born 9 July 1986) is a Lithuanian actress and TV presenter.

== Biography ==
Grudytė was born on 9 July 1986 in the city of Šiauliai, Lithuanian SSR, but periodically stayed with relatives in the village of Kaltinėnai. In kindergarten, she took part in the children's song contest Dainų dainelė, and later sang in the ensemble "En-den-du" under the direction of Vadim Kamrazer. As she subsequently claimed, her idol was singer Robbie Williams. In addition to singing, Grudytė also learned to play musical instruments: kanklės and piano. In high school, she studied at Šiauliai University Gymnasium, and after graduation she entered the Šiauliai University, in the faculty of art, which she graduated with a degree in "Pop Art".

Grudytė started to work on TV3 Lithuania. In 2010, she unexpectedly received an invitation to one of the main roles of the television series "Naisių vasara". The series turned out to be very popular and was shot until 2015, and the audience noticed a beautiful girl who was even called a potential sex symbol of Lithuania. In 2012, she starred in the romantic comedy "Single Valentine", which included a number of erotic scenes, which is why the picture in some media was called the most erotic Lithuanian film of the year. Also in 2012, Grudytė starred in the Georgian–Lithuanian television series "Vyno kelias". Over the next two years, she starred in two more foreign projects – the Ukrainian television series "The Sniffer" and the Russian disaster film "Flight Crew".

== Personal life ==
The first time Grudytė got married at 22, and by the time she started filming in the series "Naisių vasara," she was already pregnant. The high popularity and constant employment of the actress became the cause of family quarrels, so the couple soon broke up, while Grudytė took her six-month-old daughter. A year and a half later, she married a second time.
