= Hardcore Henry =

2015 film by Ilya Naishuller

- US theatrical release poster
- Directed by: Ilya Naishuller
- Written by: Ilya Naishuller
- Produced by: Timur Bekmambetov; Inga Vainshtein Smith; Ilya Naishuller; Ekaterina Kononenko
- Starring: Sharlto Copley; Danila Kozlovsky; Haley Bennett; Andrei Dementiev; Dasha Charusha; Svetlana Ustinova
- Cinematography: Sergey Valyaev; Andrey Dementiev; Ilya Naishuller; Pasha Kapinos; Vsevolod Kaptur; Fedor Lyass
- Edited by: Steve Mirkovich
- Music by: Dasha Charusha
- Production companies: Bazelevs; Versus Pictures; H. Brothers
- Distributed by: Mirsand (Russia); STX Entertainment (United States)
- Release dates: September 12, 2015 (TIFF); April 7, 2016 (Russia); April 8, 2016 (United States)
- Running time: 96 minutes
- Countries: United States; Russia
- Languages: English; Russian
- Budget: $2 million
- Box office: $16.8 million

Hardcore Henry (Note: (also known simply as Hardcore (Russian: Хардкор) in some countries)) is a 2015 action thriller film written and directed by Ilya Naishuller (in his feature directorial debut), and produced by Timur Bekmambetov, Naishuller, Inga Vainshtein Smith, and Ekaterina Kononenko. Will Stewart provided additional writing. The film is shot entirely from the first-person perspective of its protagonist.

An international co-production of the United States and Russia, it stars Sharlto Copley, Danila Kozlovsky, Haley Bennett, and Tim Roth. The film was released theatrically in Russia on April 7, 2016 by Mirsand and the United States on April 8, 2016 by STX Entertainment.

It garnered mixed reviews in the U.S., but was more positively received in Russia. Despite grossing $16.8 million worldwide against a $2 million budget, it was considered a box-office bomb in the U.S., given the exorbitant expenses STX incurred on acquiring worldwide rights to the film and marketing it.

== Plot ==
A man wakes inside a laboratory on an airship. A scientist, Estelle, tells him that his name is Henry, she is his wife, and he has been revived after an accident that left him amnesiac and mute. She replaces his missing limbs with cybernetic prostheses, but mercenaries led by the psychokinetic Akan raid the ship before she can replace Henry's voice. Akan claims all of Estelle's research as his corporate property. He kills Estelle's scientists, but Henry and Estelle flee in an escape pod, landing in Moscow. The mercenaries follow and abduct Estelle.

Henry is rescued by a stranger named Jimmy, who informs him that his cybernetic limbs are running out of power, which will kill him if he cannot recharge. Jimmy is killed by corrupt police paid by Akan, but Henry escapes. He is joined by another Jimmy, now an alcoholic bum, who informs him that one of Akan's associates, Slick Dimitry, has a charging pump which Henry needs to recharge. The two are attacked, and again Jimmy is killed. Henry escapes, and hunts Dimitry through Moscow before capturing him. Just as Dimitry promises him information, he is killed by a sniper. Henry removes the pump from Dimitry's heart and receives a call from Jimmy, who directs Henry to a brothel.

Henry meets two more distinct versions of Jimmy; one a nervous nerd, the other a drug-fuelled sex maniac, who replaces his pump. The brothel is attacked by Akan's forces. Akan taunts Henry about Estelle, who is being transported by an armored convoy, before ejecting Henry from the brothel. Outside, Henry encounters another Jimmy, a stoner, who transports him to Akan's convoy. Henry attacks the convoy and locates Estelle and Akan, who beats him with a baseball bat and has him buried in the woods.

Jimmy finds Henry before he's buried and resuscitates him, only to be shelled by a tank. After killing the tank crew and fending off a helicopter, Henry finds another Jimmy, who leads him to an abandoned hotel and a hidden laboratory. Here, the original Jimmy—a quadriplegic scientist—reveals that he is seeking revenge against Akan, who crippled him after his own cyborg super-soldiers failed. The other Jimmys are actually clones based on aspects of the original Jimmy's personality that he can control via a headset. The clones sing and dance with Henry to the song "I've Got You Under My Skin". Jimmy realizes that Henry has been unknowingly broadcasting his location to Akan, and the two fight their way out of the building against the opposing strike force.

Jimmy and Henry drive to Akan's headquarters. They fight their way into an elevator, but the real Jimmy is mortally wounded. Before dying, Jimmy thanks Henry for being a friend, and removes a memory blocker, gradually restoring Henry's memories. Henry fights his way to the highest floor, where he is greeted by Akan and an army of cyborg super-soldiers with Henry's memories. On the roof, Henry wipes out the entire army to the song "Don't Stop Me Now", before Akan severely wounds Henry. Estelle arrives and reveals that she is actually Akan's wife. Everything that happened was an elaborate ruse to field-test their ability to manipulate cyborg soldiers into doing anything to "rescue their wives", including committing terrorist acts.

Akan and Estelle prepare to board a helicopter, leaving Henry for dead. Although Henry blacks out, a memory of his father soon revives him and motivates him to finish Akan. After a brutal fight, Henry jumps onto Estelle's helicopter, Akan's severed head in hand. Estelle asks him how he did it and he paints an "EZ" on the wall with his own blood to mock her. Enraged, she shoots Henry several times, and one of the bullets ricochets off of a barbed wire wrapped around his prosthetic hand and hits her, causing her to stumble out of the helicopter. As she tries to manipulate him into saving her, Henry slams the door on Estelle's hands, sending her plummeting to her death. During the credits, a recording from Jimmy tells Henry he has another thing to do.

== Cast ==
- Sergey Valyaev, Andrei Dementiev, Ilya Naishuller, David Malic, and others as Henry
- Sharlto Copley as Jimmy
- Danila Kozlovsky as Akan
- Haley Bennett as Estelle
- Tim Roth as Henry's Father
- Andrei Dementiev as Dimitry "Slick Dimitry"
- Oleg Poddubnyy as Yuri
- Cyrus Arnold as Nat (credited as "Young Bully #2")
- Ilya Naishuller as Timothy / Higher-Self Merc
- Will Stewart as Robbie
- Martin Cooke as Marty
- Dasha Charusha as Katya, The Dominatrix
- Svetlana Ustinova as Olga, The Dominatrix
- Aleksandr Pal as Mr. Fahrenheit

Henry was originally played by Russian stuntman/camera operator Sergey Valyaev, but the camera rig used in production eventually caused him severe neck pain. The role was given to Andrei Dementiev (who also played Slick Dimitry). Dementiev suffered neck pain as well, in addition to losing a tooth after being accidentally struck by a stuntman. In scenes where Danila Kozlovsky and Sharlto Copley talked directly to Henry, Valyaev and Dementiev wore shades to prevent the actors from looking at them instead of the camera. In a few scenes, particularly the ones where his face is reflected, Henry was played by Naishuller himself. Several stuntmen portrayed Henry between scenes—in all, more than ten actors shared the role.

Bodybuilding champion Alexey Karas appeared as a muscular cyborg. Video blogger BadComedian appears in a cameo.

== Production ==
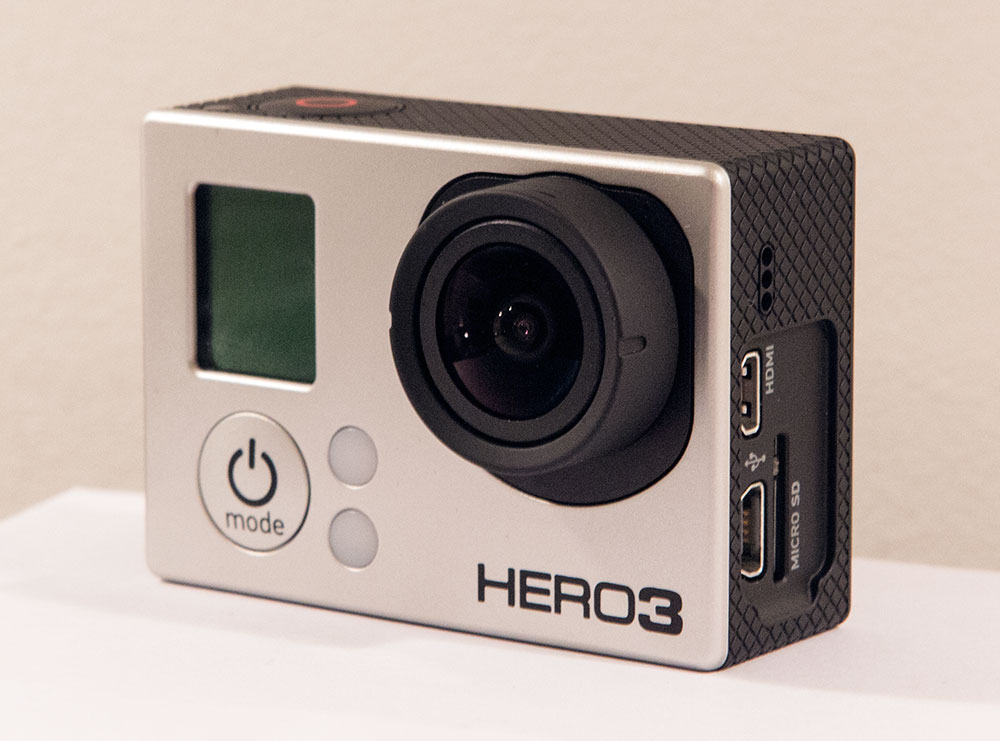
GoPro Hero 3

Hardcore Henry was filmed with GoPro cameras mounted on a specially made mask designed by Sergey Valyaev, dubbed the "Adventure Mask", and stabilization systems that used either electronics or magnets, created by the movie's director of photography, Vsevolod Kaptur. Many prototypes of the mask were used to film the movie. Between the electronics and the magnet stabilization systems, Naishuller chose the magnets, as he felt that it resembled natural head movement. The recordings from the GoPro cameras were edited to cut the hundreds of shots together into one continuous film.

Blender, open-source software, was used for providing most of the visual effects for the film.

While it was not the first feature film to exclusively use first-person point of view (for example, 1947's Lady in the Lake was shot this way), the concept for the film came from the "Bad Motherfucker" and "The Stampede" music videos, which Naishuller made with Valyaev for his band, Biting Elbows. These were also shot with a GoPro from the first-person perspective. The movie was partially funded with Indiegogo.

== Release ==
The film premiered at the 2015 Toronto International Film Festival on September 12, 2015. The film became one of the highest-profile at the festival, and led to a bidding war between Lionsgate, Universal and STX Entertainment. Ultimately, STX acquired worldwide rights to Hardcore, including a wide release commitment, for $10 million, becoming the studio's first festival acquisition. It was retitled Hardcore Henry for its international release. At the festival, the film won the Grolsch People's Choice Midnight Madness Award. The film was released on April 8, 2016, by STX.

=== Home media ===
On July 26, 2016, Hardcore Henry was released on Blu-ray and DVD by Universal Pictures Home Entertainment.

== Reception ==
=== Box office ===
Hardcore Henry has grossed $9.3 million in North America and $7.6 million in other territories for a worldwide total of $16.8 million, against a budget of $2 million.

In the United States and Canada, pre-release tracking suggested the film would gross $7–10 million from 3,015 theaters in its opening weekend, trailing fellow newcomer The Boss ($20–24 million projection) but besting fellow newcomer Demolition ($2–3 million projection). It grossed $380,000 from its early Thursday screenings and $2 million on its first day. It went on to gross $5.1 million in its opening weekend, finishing 5th at the box office. After two weeks, the film was pulled from 2,496 theaters which was the second-largest third-weekend theater drop of all time, behind Meet Dave (2,523 in 2008).

=== Critical response ===
On review aggregation website Rotten Tomatoes the film had an approval rating of 51%, based on 149 reviews, with an average rating of 5.6/10. The site's critical consensus reads, "Hardcore Henry seems poised to reinvent the action flick, but without a story or characters worth caring about, its first-person gimmick quickly loses its thrill." Metacritic gives the film a score of 51 out of 100, based on 30 critics, indicating "mixed or average" reviews. Audiences polled by CinemaScore gave the film an average grade of "C+" on an A+ to F scale. According to the Russian aggregator Kritikanstvo, Hardcore Henry was rated 7.9/10 on average by Russian critics (based on 52 reviews), and received only one negative review.

Max Nicholson of IGN rated the film 8.6/10, stating "Two parts FPS, one part platformer and a pinch of HowToBasic, director Ilya Naishuller's Hardcore Henry is a recipe for non-stop, ludicrous fun. While the film's actual story is nigh inexistent, it's sure to please gamers and action junkies alike with its inventive set pieces and mind-boggling action ... Hardcore Henry lives up to the title with non-stop, off-the-wall action and a love for all things video games."

== Future ==
Naishuller and Copley said in an interview with TechRadar that they would be willing to make a sequel. Naishuller said:

I have an outline for a second one. If there's a need and a want for it. Both Sharlto and I would make a second one. It'd be much, much quicker. It may not be three years this time ... it may be two years and six months... People are going to download or pirate it. You'll want an opinion on it, especially if you're a gamer. The question is whether people will turn up to the cinema to watch it.

The film was considered a financial flop due to distribution costs of around $10 million for the film.
