= Danila Kozlovsky =

Russian film and theater actor and director

- Данила Козловский
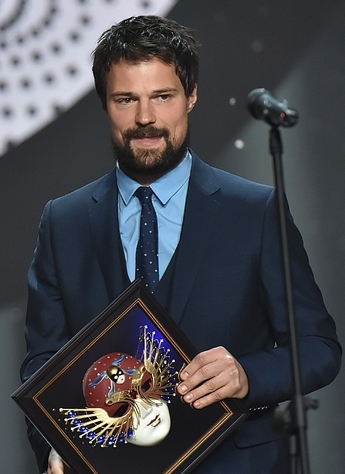
- At the Golden Mask award ceremony, 2017
- Born: 3 May 1985 (age 41); Moscow (USSR)
- Occupation: Actor
- Years active: 2004–present
- Spouse(s): Urszula Małka (m. 2008; div. 2011), Oksana Akinshina (m. 2026)
- Children: 2
- Awards: Golden Eagle Award; Nika Award; Honoured Artist of the Russian Federation
- Website: danilakozlovskiy.com

Danila Valeryevich Kozlovsky (Russian: Данила Валерьевич Козловский; born 3 May 1985) is a Russian actor and director. His most famous roles in films include Vampire Academy and Soulless, as well as the TV series Vikings. During his career, he achieved international popularity in Eastern European countries.

== Biography ==
Kozlovsky was born in Moscow. His mother, Nadezhda Zvenigorodskaya, is a stage actress, and his father, Valery Kozlovsky, was a professor at Moscow State University specializing in marketing and mass communications. He is the second of three brothers, an older brother Yegor, and a younger brother, Ivan. From a young age, Kozlovsky was placed in dance and music classes, learning to play the saxophone and the alto. During his early years, he frequently changed schools, potentially due to discipline issues. He made his big screen debut in 1998, playing the troubled sixth grader Denis on the Russian television series Simple Truths.

In 1996, he was accepted into the Kronshtadt Naval Military School, which he attended until his graduation in 2002. Upon graduation, he matriculated to the Saint Petersburg State Theatre Arts Academy, entering the acting/directing course supervised by Lev Dodin. During his fourth year he made his debut on the stage of the Little Drama Theatre (Theatre de l’Europe), playing the part of Edgar in King Lear (2006). The role brought him his first theatre award: a special prize of Expert Council of the "Golden Sofit" (the top-rated theatre award in Saint Petersburg) for Best Debut. Then there was a role in the play Life and Fate, which premiered in Paris and the diploma performance "Warsaw Melody".

After graduating from the academy in 2007, Danila Kozlovskiy was officially admitted to the staff of the Little Drama Theatre (Theatre de l'Europe). In his repertoire were added performances Lord of the Flies, where he played Ralph, Intrigue and Love and The Cherry Orchard.

In 2005, he also received his first important film role — in the picture Garpastum. The film, set during the time of the First World War, tells the story of two brothers who wish to build their own football stadium. Kozlovsky received the Russian Guild of Film Critics "White Elephant Award" for the best male lead actor.

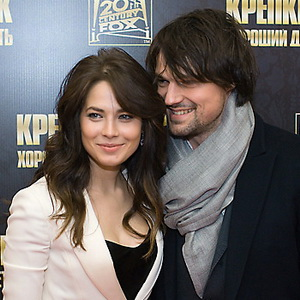
Yuliya Snigir and Danila Kozlovsky, during the premiere of A Good Day to Die Hard, 2013

Kozlovsky gained wider publicity in 2008 with his starring role in the film Black Hunters. There he played the role of robber archaeologist Sergei Filatov, who is transported into the past together with his friends when making illegal excavations.

In 2009, he portrayed drag queen Lusya in the comedy-drama Jolly Fellows. It was screened in the Panorama section of the 2010 Berlin International Film Festival.

=== Soulless and breakthrough ===
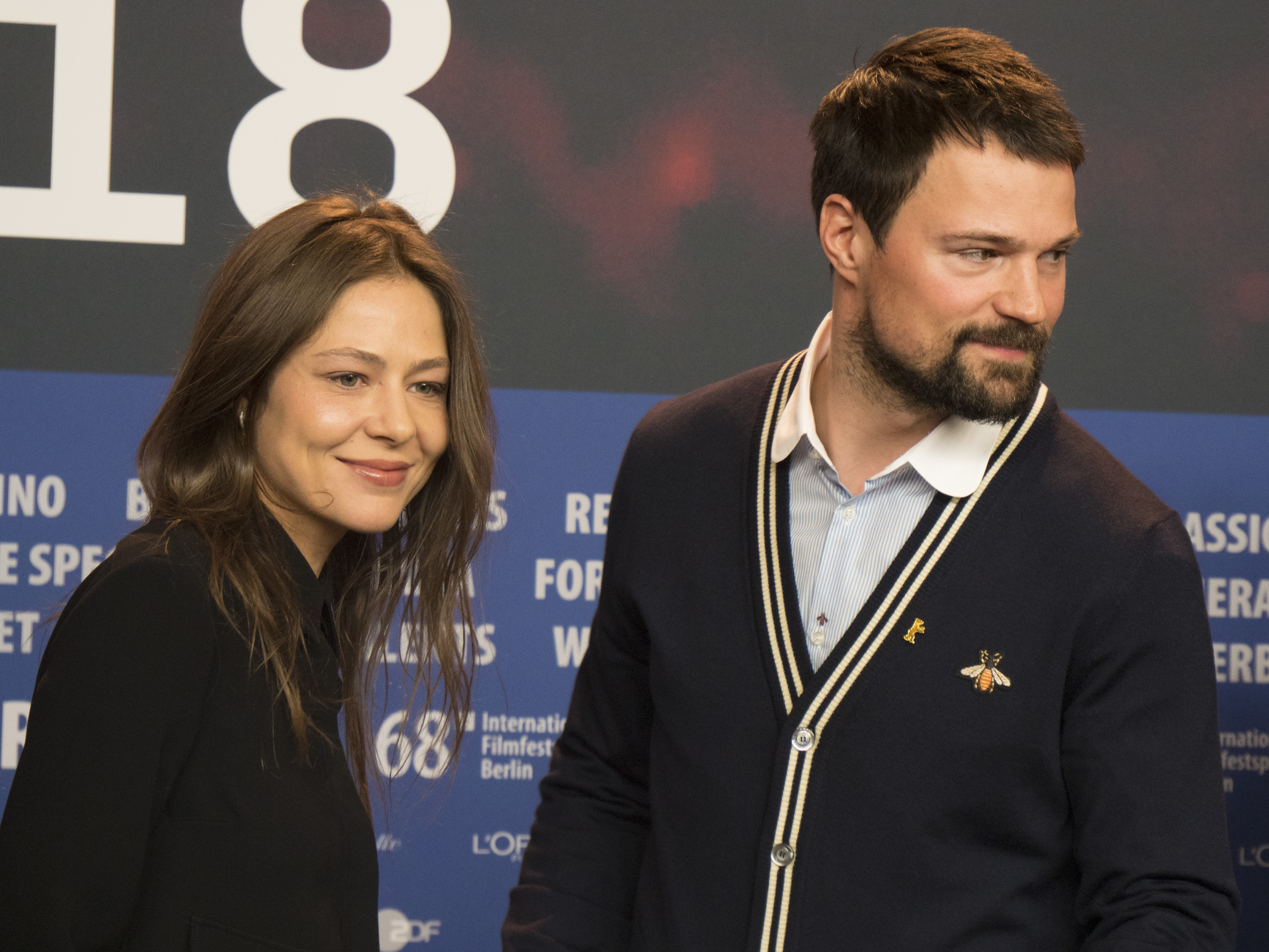
Elena Lyadova and Danila Kozlovsky at the press conference of Dovlatov at Berlinale 2018

After Kozlovsky starred in the 2012 film Soulless he became a household name in Russia. He played the lead role of Max Andreev, a young ambitious executive manager who begins to reevaluate his priorities in life and career. The film was a hit and grossed $13 million. He received the National Golden Eagle Award for Soulless (2012, nomination "Best Cinema Actor"). The film was followed by a sequel in 2015, for which he won the Nika Award as best actor.

Kozlovsky played the role of Yegor Dorin, in the 2012 film The Spy, based on the Boris Akunin novel.

In 2013, he portrayed ice-hockey player Valeri Kharlamov in the sports drama Legend № 17. The film was a critical and box office success, earning $29.5 million at the box-office.

Kozlovsky starred in his first Hollywood film in 2014; he played Dimitri Belikov in the comedy-horror picture Vampire Academy.

The year 2016 saw Kozlovsky star in five films — romantic comedy Status: non-engaged, sci-fi action film Hardcore Henry, comedy film Friday, disaster film Flight Crew and historical action film Viking.

Out of the aforementioned films, the most popular ones at the box-office were Flight Crew, earning $27 million, and Viking which grossed $34 million.

He played Count Vorontzov in the film Matilda (2017), which told the story of the romance between Emperor Nicholas II and ballerina Mathilde Kschessinska. The film became controversial after State Duma deputy Natalia Poklonskaya led a campaign to ban the film on religious grounds.

Also in 2017, it was announced that Kozlovsky will appear as Oleg of Novgorod in the sixth season of popular Canadian historical drama Vikings.

In 2018, Kozlovsky played a supporting role in Dovlatov. The biographical picture about writer Sergei Dovlatov premiered at the 2018 Berlinale in competition.

Danila Kozlovsky's directorial debut Coach was released in 2018.

In 2021, he directed the film Chernobyl: Abyss, the soundtrack for the film was recorded by Alla Pugacheva.

== In the media ==
In 2013, GQ Russia picked Danila Kozlovsky as Man of the Year.

Kozlovsky appeared in advertisements for Chanel's Coco Mademoiselle alongside Keira Knightley in 2015.

For a number of years, he was cited as a “sex symbol” by various media outlets in Russia.

== Personal life ==
Vladimir Putin meeting with the crew of "Viking", a film Kozlovsky later expressed regret participating in.

In late 2008, Kozlovsky married the Maly Drama Theatre actress Urszula Małka. They divorced in 2011. Kozlovsky was in a relationship with actress and model Olga Zueva from 2014 to 2020. They split shortly after Olga gave birth to their daughter Oda Valentina Zueva (born in February 2020).

On 24 and 27 February 2022, Kozlovsky posted several Instagram posts condemning the 2022 Russian invasion of Ukraine, sharing an image of a crying refugee. In his 27 February post, Kozlovsky admitted to and apologized for his indifference to the annexation of Crimea by the Russian Federation in 2014. Kozlovsky's film Viking had been filmed in parts of the Russia-annexed territory of Crimea. According to Novaya Gazeta, Kozlovsky has faced harassment due to his stance against the invasion and has faced difficulties finding new film roles.

Danila married Oksana Akinshina, and they had a son in May 2026.

== Theater ==
=== Little Drama Theatre (Theatre de l’Europe) ===
- 2006 – King Lear – Edgar
- 2006 – Whim – Barkalov, the manager of the estate
- 2007 – The Warsaw Melody – Victor
- 2007 – Life and Fate – Novikov
- 2009 – The Lord of the Flies – Ralph
- 2010 – Lorenzaccio – Lorenzaccio
- 2012 – Intrigue and Love – Ferdinand
- 2013 – The Cherry Orchard – Lopakhin
- 2016 – Hamlet – Hamlet

=== Theater Post ===
- 2012 – Shoot / Get Treasure / Repeat by Mark Ravenhill, director Dmitri Volktostrelov – Dictator

=== Clapham Grand ===
- 2024 — Frank, director Savva Savelev — Himself

== Filmography ==
Year	Title	Original Title	Role	Notes
1999	Simple Truths	Простые истины	Denis Selivyorstov	TV series
2003	Dancing on the Waves	Я всё решу сама: Танцующая на волнах	Valera	TV series
2003	Streets of Broken Lights	Улицы разбитых фонарей	soldier-deserter Popov	TV series
2004	Sissi: The Rebel Empress	Сисси – мятежная императрица	Young Franz Joseph	TV film
2004	On Verhniaya Maslovka street	На Верхней Масловке	Modigliani	
2005	Garpastum	Гарпастум	Nikolay	Russian Guild of Film Critics Award for Best Actor
2006	Alka	Алька	Lenya Astakhov	TV miniseries
2006	Crime and Weather	Преступление и погода	Victor	
2007	Lenin's Legacy	Завещание Ленина	Sergei	TV miniseries
2008	Black Hunters	Мы из будущего	Sergei "Bormann" Filatov	Also known as We Are from the Future and Back in Time; Nominated—MTV Russia Movie Award for Best Kiss (shared with Ekaterina Klimova)
2009	Jolly Fellows	Весельчаки	Lyusya	
2009	A. D.	А. Д.	Daniil Ageev	TV
2010	On-alone	Одиночка	Andrei Gromov	TV
2010	Attempt	Покушение	Yevgeniy Kostin	TV series
2010	Moscow, I Love You!	Москва, я люблю тебя!	Taxi driver	
2010	Hamlet. XXI Century	Гамлет XXI век	Laertes	
2011	Gulf Stream Under the Iceberg	Гольфстрим под айсбергом	Ari Brylskiy	
2011	Target	Мишень	Mitya	
2011	Five Brides	Пять невест	Alexei Kaverin	
2011	Skerries-18	Шхера-18	Andrei Egorov	TV
2011	Raspoutine	Распутин	Grand Duke Dmitri Pavlovich	Russian-French co-production
2012	The Spy	Шпион	Yegor Dorin	
2012	Soulless	Духless	Max Andreev	Golden Eagle Award for Best Leading Actor; Nominated—Nika Award for Best Actor; Nominated—Russian Guild of Film Critics Award for Best Actor
2013	Legend № 17	Легенда No. 17	Valeri Kharlamov	
2013	Everything Began in Harbin	Всё началось в Харбине	Boris Eybozhenko	TV series
2013	The habit to leave	Привычка расставаться	Vadim	
2014	Dubrovsky	Дубровский	Vladimir Dubrovsky	Feature film and TV mini-series
2014	Vampire Academy	Vampire Academy: Blood Sisters	Dimitri Belikov	
2015	Soulless 2	Духless 2	Max Andreev	
2016	Status: Free	Статус: Свободен	Nikita Kolesnikov	
2016	Friday	Пятница	Mikhail Bondar	
2016	Hardcore Henry	Хардкор	Akan	
2016	Flight Crew	Экипаж	Alexey Guchshin	Remake of Air Crew
2016	Viking	Викинг	Vladimir the Great	
2017	Matilda	Матильда	Vorontsov	
2018	McMafia	МакМафия	Grigory Mishin	TV series
2018	Dovlatov	Довлатов	David	
2018	Coach	Тренер	Yuri Stoleshnikov	
2018	In the Hood	На районе		
2019–2020	Vikings	—N/a	Oleg the Prophet	TV series, main role (season 6)
2021	Chernobyl: Abyss	Чернобыль	Alexey Karpushin	Also director
2021	Karamora	Карамора	Karamora	
2022	Molodoy chelovek	Молодой человек		
2022	Treason	—N/a	Lord Anton Melnikov	TV miniseries
2022	13 Clinical	13 Клиническая	Kirill Akinshin	TV miniseries
2022	In Two	Надвое	Kostya	TV miniseries
2025	One Call Bar	Бар «Один звонок»	The barman	TV miniseries, Main Role
2026	Firing Zhora	Уволить Жору	Maks	movie, Main role
2026	First	Первая ракетка	Tennis player Igor Strelnikov	TV miniseries, Main role
2026	From London with Love	—N/a		English-speaking movie, also Director
2026	NoOneWhoAreYou	НиктоКакТы	Mark	movie
2026	Time Noise	Шум Времени		

== Awards and nominations ==
Award	Year	Category	Nominated work	Result
Nika Award	2015	Best Actor	Soulless 2	Won
Glamour Awards	2013	Man of the Year	—N/a	Won
Golden Eagle Awards	2012	Golden Eagle Award for Best Leading Actor	Soulless	Won
Golden Floodlight Theatre Awards	2006	Best Debut	King Lear	Won
GQ Awards	2013	Man of the Year	—N/a	Won
MTV Russia Movie Awards	2008	Best Kiss (shared with Ekaterina Klimova)	Black Hunters	Nominated
Nika Awards	2012	Best Actor	Soulless	Nominated
Russian Guild of Film Critics Awards	2005	Best Actor	Garpastum	Won
Russian Guild of Film Critics Awards	2012	Best Actor	Soulless	Nominated
Constellation Film Actors Festival	2008	Best Leading Actor	Back in Time	Won
