= The Route Is Calculated =

- Russian: Маршрут построен
- Directed by: Oleg Asadulin
- Written by: Ivan Kapitonov; Oleg Assadulin
- Produced by: Georgiy Malkov; Vladimir Polyakov; Ivan Kapitonov; Daniil Makhort; Anastasiya Akopyan; Dmitriy Kondratev
- Starring: Pavel Chinaryov; Svetlana Ustinova; Vitaliya Korniyenko; Kristina Shapovalova
- Cinematography: Anton Zenkovich
- Edited by: Kirill Araslanov
- Music by: Evgeniy Rudin (DJ Gruv)
- Production companies: Enjoy Movies; Ultra Film
- Distributed by: 20th Century Fox CIS
- Release date: March 31, 2016
- Running time: 85 minutes
- Country: Russia
- Language: Russian
- Budget: 40 million rubles
- Box office: 803 427 dollars

The Route Is Calculated (Russian: Маршрут построен) is a 2016 Russian horror thriller film directed by Oleg Asadulin.

== Plot ==
A man killed his own wife, dismembered the corpse and hid the body of a woman in the trunk of a car. A few months later, a man named Andrey buys a cheap, but high-quality car and with his family goes to another city. During the trip, his wife Olga hears unusual sounds and informs Andrey about it and this causes conflict between them, because Andrei does not hear anything like that. And their daughter at this time is talking to an invisible woman who does not like family conflicts and gets power over family, the route of which has already been calculated.

== Cast ==
- Pavel Chinaryov as Andrey
- Svetlana Ustinova as Olga
- Vitaliya Korniyenko as Ksyusha
- Kristina Shapovalova as saleswoman at a gas station
- Sergey Safronov as Pop
- Ilya Safronov as Pop
- Andrey Safronov as Pop
- Diana Melison as Lena
- Aleksandr Tsyoma as hunter
