= Friday (2016 film) =

- Directed by: Yevgeny Shelyakin
- Screenplay by: Yevgeny Shelyakin; Ibrahim Magomedov; Said Davdiyev; Maxim Anikin; Alexey Shuravin
- Produced by: Rashid Sardarov; Ibrahim Magomedov; Binke Anisimov
- Starring: Danila Kozlovsky; Sergey Burunov; Anton Shagin; Katerina Shpitsa; Pavel Derevyanko
- Cinematography: Andrei DeBabov
- Music by: Anatoly Burnosov; Pavel Yesenin; Vitaliy Kudrin; Ivan Suslin; Mikhail Morskov; Artem Fedotov; NEOPOLEON
- Production company: RSS Production
- Distributed by: Central Partnership
- Release date: February 26, 2016
- Running time: 107 minutes
- Country: Russia
- Language: Russian
- Box office: $1 401 660

Friday (Russian: Пятница, romanized: Pyatnitsa) is a 2016 Russian comedy film directed by Yevgeny Shelyakin.

== Plot ==
The film shows a Friday evening in one posh Moscow nightclub, which is just celebrating the anniversary of its opening. In the club this evening the rich "mama's boy" Mikhail Bondar is having fun, who has his own big shoe producing company, although which is currently in crisis. He is very passionate, likes to argue and show off, but does not like to lose. Friends play a trick on him and offer him a dispute: he will serve the restaurant's attendees as a waiter until 3 am and if he gets 10,000 rubles a tip at the end of the evening he will win. As a prize, he will receive his friend's car or lose his. This task is difficult for Bondar who was born with the silver spoon and has a tough temper, but now he has to work hard to appease moody clients.

== Cast ==
- Danila Kozlovsky as Mikhail Bondar, the millionaire-waiter
- Sergey Burunov as Igor Strizhevsky, club manager
- Anton Shagin as Vitaly Belov
- Katerina Shpitsa as Vera
- Pavel Derevyanko as Gennady Antonov, psychologist
- Maxim Emelyanov as Valentin Spivak, a friend of Goshi
- Aristarchus Venes as Gosha
- Nastasya Samburskaya as Lera, "tequila girl"
- Kirill Pletnyov as Max
- Evgeniya Khirivskaya as Elena Antonova
- Yevgeny Stychkin as Ilya
- Nikita Pavlenko as Arkady
- Mikhail Politseymako as Lyosha
- Azamat Nigmanov as Temir
- Emmanuil Vitorgan as Sergey Viktorovich Dubravin, actor
- Alexey Grishin as Andreas
- Boris Khvoshnyansky as Nikas, the artist
- Anton Shurtzov as Kostya, the waiter
- Farhad Mahmudov as Ahmat, the chef
- Irina Butanaeva as Ulmas
- Sergey Chirkov as Yegor
- Leonid Telezhinsky as Stas
- Yan Tsapnik as Vadim Ravilevich, travel agency director
- BadComedian as cameo

== Production ==
The film was shot in the "Icon" club in Moscow.
