= Tatyana Kosmacheva =

Russian actress

- Born: Tatyana Vladimirovna Kosmachyova; March 13, 1985 (age 40); Reutov, Moscow Oblast, RSFSR, USSR
- Citizenship: Russian
- Occupation: Actress
- Years active: 2006–present

Tatyana Vladimirovna Kosmacheva (Russian: Татьяна Владимировна Космачёва; born 13 March 1985) is a Russian theater and film actress.

== Biography ==
Tatyana Kosmacheva born March 13, 1985, in Reutov. She is a well-known actress. Kosmacheva can play piano. Kosmacheva loved theater from a young age. She took some acting lessons and then she found a job in theater. After that, she auditioned to take a lead role in the mystery-thriller TV series Zakrytaya shkola (English: Closed school), finally she took the part.

== Filmography ==
| Year | Title | Role | Notes |
|---|---|---|---|
| 2006–2010 | Law and Order: Department of operative investigations | Yulya Merkulina | TV series, second season |
| 2008 | Provincial | Rita Zaytseva | TV series |
| 2010 | The Phobos | Yuliya | |
| 2010 | The basic version | Ira Zavidova | TV series |
| 2010 | We serve the Fatherland! | Liza | TV |
| 2010 | Foundling 2 | Olga | TV |
| 2010–2011 | Closed school | Victoria Kuznetsova | TV series |
| 2011 | Pilot International Airlines | Lyubov Strizhak | TV Mini-Series |
| 2012 | Mamy | segment "Moyey lyubimoy" | |
| 2012 | Foundling 3 | Olga | TV |
| 2013 | And the ball will come back | Tanya | TV series |
| 2013 | Rock Climber | Nina | TV series |
| 2014 | Is light on sight | Anzhela | |
| 2014 | Mixed feelings | Katya | |
| 2014 | The Ship | Dasha | TV series |
| 2014 | If you are not with me | Natasha Sevastyanova | TV series |
| 2014 | Last minute 2 | Olga, the novella "Improving" | TV series |
| 2014 | My sister, Love | Katya | |
