= Flight Crew (film) =

- Film poster from 2016
- Directed by: Nikolai Lebedev
- Written by: Tikhon Kornev; Nikolay Kulikov; Nikolai Lebedev; Yuriy Korotkov; Aleksey Onishchenko
- Based on: Air Crew by Alexander Mitta
- Produced by: Leonid Vereshchagin (ru); Anton Zlatopolskiy (ru); Nikita Mikhalkov
- Starring: Vladimir Mashkov; Danila Kozlovsky; Agnė Grudytė; Katerina Shpitsa; Sergey Kempo Sergey Shakurov; Elena Yakovleva; Sergey Romanovich
- Cinematography: Irek Hartowicz
- Edited by: Konstantin Larchenko
- Music by: Artyom Vasilev (ru)
- Production companies: Three T Productions; Russia-1
- Distributed by: Central Partnership, Mosfilm and Cinema Fund
- Release dates: February 20, 2016 (Berlinale); April 21, 2016 (Russia)
- Running time: 140 minutes
- Country: Russia
- Languages: Russian; English
- Budget: $9 million ₽650 million
- Box office: $29,171,110 ₽1.504 billion

Flight Crew (Russian: Экипаж, translit. Ekipazh) is a Russian disaster film directed by Nikolai Lebedev and produced by Russia-1 Channel which released in April 2016. It stars Vladimir Mashkov, Danila Kozlovsky and Agnė Grudytė. This was a remake of the 1979 Soviet film Air Crew and it was the second disaster film shot in the Russian Federation.

The film was shot with digital 3D cameras and became the second Russian film released in IMAX after Stalingrad. The premiere took place on April 21, 2016, by Central Partnership. The film received positive reviews from critics, who praised the special effects, action sequences, acting, and the tense atmosphere. The film was a box office success, becoming the highest-grossing Russian film of 2016. At the 2017 Golden Eagle Awards, the film received 11 nominations including Best Feature Film, Best Director (Nikolai Lebedev) and Best Actor (Kozlovsky), winning five (Best Visual Effects, Best Supporting Actor for Sergey Shakurov, Best Music, Best Film Editing and Best Sound).

== Plot ==
Alexey Gushchin, a talented young military pilot, is given a mission to deliver a cargo of supplies for charity, but the plane is also filled with cars for a general whose friend's daughter is getting married. During the mission, realising that the plane cannot go through the storm easily, he disposes of one of the cars in mid-air. For his actions, he is prevented from flying a military aircraft again and in spite of that, he asks his father Igor (a famous aircraft engineer) for help getting back on the scene. He applies to a passenger airline, with Leonid Zinchenko overseeing his examination in a simulation. During the test, Alexey demonstrates impressive flying skills, but fails the test when he is unable to prevent the plane from crashing into a building on landing. Leonid, under pressure from his peers, retries the test and also crashes, forcing him to hire Alexey as the second pilot-trainee on the Tu-204SM along with attendant Andrey under the guidance of Zinchenko. Meanwhile, Zinchenko is experiencing family problems due to his absence from home and his alienation from his son Valera, who has abandoned education. Meanwhile, Alexey begins a relationship with pilot Alexandra Kuzmina.

On one of their flights, Gushchin and Zinchenko evacuate tourists from an African country in a revolution, but Gushchin becomes appalled when he learns that Zinchenko refused to allow the locals to board the plane. Zinchenko tells him that he must just stick to his orders.

While preparing for a flight, Gushchin confronts a wealthy man who refuses to obey safety regulations. Eventually, this leads to a fight on a plane, and Gushchin is fired. At the same time, he and Alexandra strain their relationship. The next day, on the train, Gushchin is confronted by Zinchenko who, impressed with Alexey's abilities, wants him back. Zinchenko also plans to take Valera on the next flight as well to convince him to continue his education.

The crew boards the plane for a flight to Southeast Asia, during which they receive a message about a volcanic eruption on one of the Aleutian Islands called Kanwoo. The crew arrives at the Kanwoo airport, where they discover that many people were killed or injured. They must now evacuate the remaining people who are coming on minibuses. Gushchin goes to the airport, when suddenly a powerful earthquake destroys the airport's infrastructure and destroys one of the runways, while the other one is covered with burning oil.

The crew then receives word that one of the minibuses has become trapped in a rockfall. Gushchin, Andrey and Valera go on two minibuses to retrieve the passengers. After the minibuses leave, Zinchenko, Alexandra and the rest of the passengers observe the eruption of the volcano. Realising that the runway will be soon overflown with lava, Zinchenko and Alexandra abandon the Tu-204 in favour of an An-26, intending to leave the Tu-204 for Alexey. Meanwhile, Gushchin, Andrey and Valera find the stranded passengers, but on their way back to the airport, the road is blocked by a lava flow. Andrey, who has driven his minivan into the lava, tells the passengers to get out of the back and climb into Gushchin's van. He manages to then save himself just in time before the van is swept off the cliff by the flow.

The trio and the passengers make it back to the airport on foot, only to find the Tu-204 standing empty and Zinchenko and the rest of the passengers gone. The group climbs into the plane. Seeing that it is impossible to take off from the main runway due to its damage, Gushchin decides to use the shorter runway, which is covered in burning oil. After a water tower breaks and puts out the fire, Gushchin is able to take off successfully. Despite several engine fires from the ash cloud, the crew manages to escape the zone. The crew then comes into contact with Zinchenko's plane. Valera, knowing of his father's actions and seeing them as unjust, tells him over the radio, "I will never forgive you".

The only appropriate airport for them to land is the Elizovo Airport, but a storm is now approaching the airport. Zinchenko reports to Alexei the fuel tank was damaged during takeoff, resulting in them rapidly losing fuel. This means that they would not be able to reach the coast. Igor, who has discovered his son's whereabouts, and is now at the air company's HQ, tells him over the radio his proposed plan: using the cage on the An-26, they can transfer the passengers from that plane to the Tu-204, which has much more fuel. Gushchin accepts the idea, and is backed by Valera, Andrey and the passengers.

The planes meet at an acceptable height, and the passengers of the An-26 transfer a cable to the Tu-204, allowing them to begin evacuating the passengers on the An-26 via the cage. The first two operations are successful, with Alexandra being amongst the ones saved, but on the third go, the cage's ropes snap, sending 11 people falling to their deaths, forcing Zinchenko to evacuate the An-26 on the cable before the plane plunges into the ocean. The crew then receives the news that conditions at Elisovo have worsened, but the crew still decides to land there due to their plane having one engine and a faulty chassis, disobeying their orders. Gushchin admits to fearing landing the malfunctioning plane in bad weather and risking the lives of passengers, but Zinchenko reminds him of his skills. At landing, the landing chassis breaks and one of the engines flies off with its wing, but nevertheless, the entire crew and passengers survive. Zinchenko congratulates Gushchin with the landing, and leaves the plane, helped by Valera, who has forgiven his father. As emergency services begin to arrive, the survivors rejoice and mourn the loss of their loved ones. Victorious, Gushchin leaves the scene into the night while Alexandra looks on.

Sometime later, Gushchin and Alexandra have married and Zinchenko has fully reconciled with Valera. Despite this, they are fired from their jobs as pilots by the flight company's director for disobeying the order to not land at Elisovo. However, after the two leave, the director calls Aeroflot, asking them if they "Are still looking for pilots". Gushcin and Zinchenko are transferred to Aeroflot as flight interns, while Alexandra becomes a pilot in the same company.

== Cast ==
- Danila Kozlovsky as Alexey Gushchin
- Vladimir Mashkov as Leonid Zinchenko
- Agnė Grudytė as Alexandra Kuzmina
- Katerina Shpitsa as Vika, stewardess
- Sergey Kempo as Andrey, flight attendant
- Sergey Shakurov as Igor Gushchin, Alexey's father
- Elena Yakovleva as Irina, Leonid's wife
- Sergey Romanovich as Valera, Leonid's son
- Vasiliy Mishchenko as Mikhail Smirnov, an employee of the airport Vnukovo
- Sergey Gazarov as Pyotr Shestakov, Director of "Pegasus Air" airline
- Dmitriy Zolotukhin as Petritsky, VIP-passenger
- Sergey Rublyov as Petritsky's assistant
- Nina Grebeshkova as passenger business-class
- Irina Lachina as passenger woman lawyer
- Yang Ge as Liu, passenger chinese girl
- Alyona Babenko as Margarita, passenger
- Olga Litvinova as Natasha, passenger
- Vyacheslav Razbegaev as Victor Nikolaevich, pilot in airport Kanwoo
- Irina Nizina as doctor girl in airport Kanwoo
- Ekaterina Vinogradova as Maria, nurse in airport Kanwoo
- Mariya Budryna as Masha
- Nikolay Alekseev as Petya
- Lyudmila Kurepova as Olga
- Daniil Mikheev as Sasha
- Aleksandra Yakovleva as Tamara, office clerk
- Nina Usatova as employee fund
- Dmitriy Mulyar as Alexander Pivnev, crew commander Major
- Anton Pampushnyy as pilot-trainee
- Vladimir Yaglych as Sinitsyn, pilot
- Irina Pegova as Lena
- Viktoriya Raykova as stewardess
- Evgeniya Khrapovitskaya as stewardess

== Production ==
=== Development ===
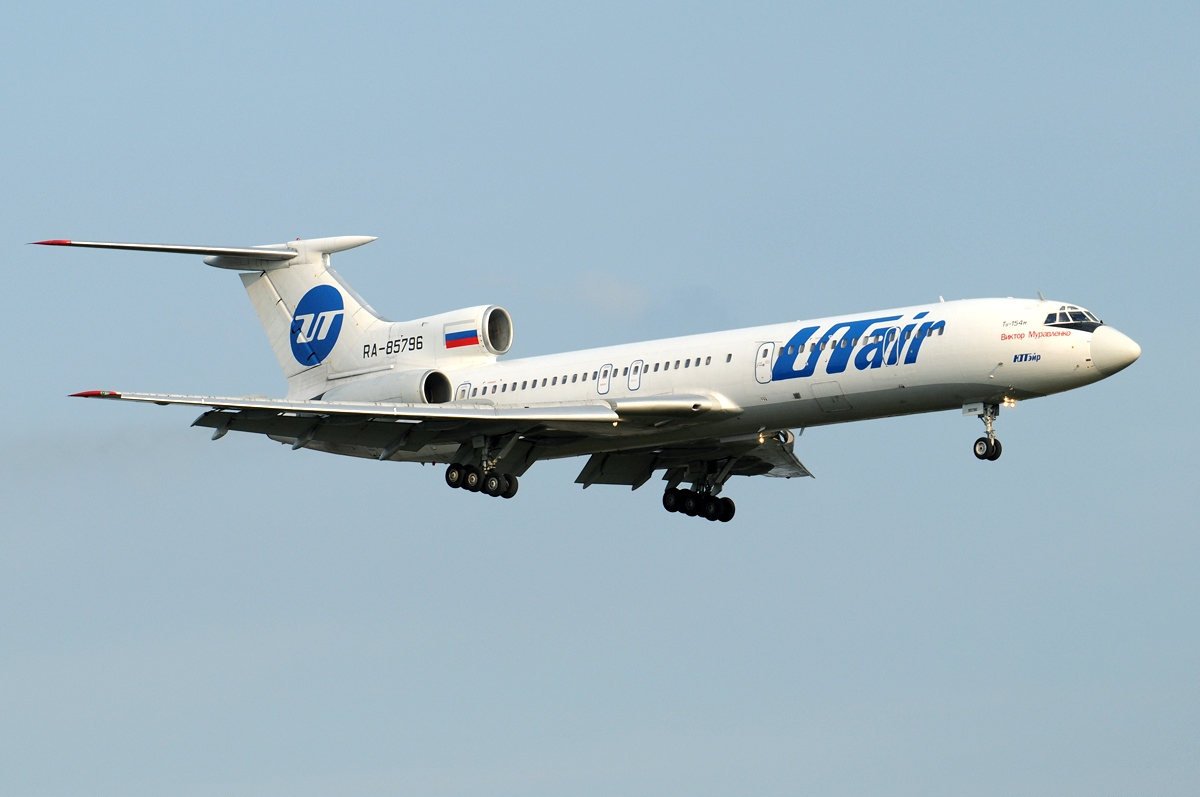
Tu-154M RA-85796 board, starring in the film (while working in UTair).

Director Nikolai Lebedev wanted to make a disaster film, but did not negotiate with potential producers, until Leonid Vereshchagin and Nikita Mikhalkov suggested to work on a remake of Air Crew. The director started work with the support of Alexander Mitta, who directed the soviet film of the same name in 1979.

The movie received support from Russian Government which funded the movie through the National Cinema Foundation.

=== Casting ===
Danila Kozlovsky, Vladimir Mashkov and Agnė Grudytė who played the pilots started to work long before the filming had begun, after receiving training in flight school at the helm of an ultramodern flight simulator.

Aleksandra Yakovleva, the performer of one of the main roles in the 1979 film, the flight attendant Tamara, played a cameo role in the film of 2016. Her character, an aviation official, is also called Tamara.

=== Filming ===
Principal photography began on September 18, 2014, and ended on February 10, 2015. Location filming took place in Moscow, Moscow region and in the Republic of Crimean peninsula. In the peninsula they filmed the earthquake-prone island volcano in the Indian Ocean. The crew shot the flight scenes in two planes: The Tupolev Tu-204SM (RA-64151 board) and decommissioned Tupolev Tu-154 of Kosmos Airlines (RA-85796 board).

=== Post-production ===
The film has been dubbed into English for international markets by LipSync Chemistry in London.

== Release ==
The film has been released in Russia and other post-Soviet states in April, 2016. The movie was also released in China. Rights to theatrical distribution of The Crew have been sold to the Middle East, Malaysia, Philippines, Japan, Taiwan, Cambodia, Turkey, Baltics, Mongolia, Chile, Peru, Bolivia and Ecuador.

The film was shot using an IMAX digital 3D camera and became the second Russian film shot using this equipment.

== Financial performance ==
The film grossed 1.43 billion ₽ (US$21.6 million) in Russia and was the fifth highest-grossing film and the highest-grossing Russian film in the country in 2016.

The film was released in China on August 19, 2016, and it grossed CN¥30.8 million at the Chinese box office.
