= Nikolai Lebedev (film director) =

Russian screenwriter and director (born 1966)

- Николай Лебедев
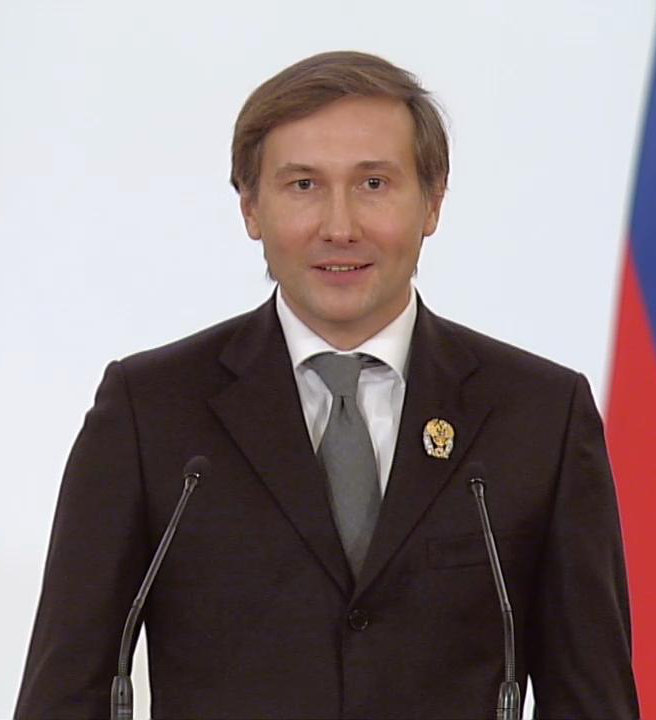
- Born: Nikolai Igorevich Lebedev; 16 November 1966 (age 59); Kishinev, Moldavian SSR
- Education: Moscow State University; Gerasimov Institute of Cinematography
- Occupations: Film director, screenwriter, film producer
- Years active: 1991–present

Nikolai Igorevich Lebedev (Russian: Николай Игоревич Лебедев; born 16 November 1966) is a Russian film director, screenwriter and film producer. Born in Kishinev, Moldavian SSR, Soviet Union (now Chișinău in Moldova).

He is best known as the director, writer, and producer of Wolfhound (2007) and Legend № 17 (2013), both of which became well grossing films in Russian cinema. Other films include the critically lauded drama The Star (2002), the drama film Soundtrack of Passion (2009), and the disaster film Flight Crew (2016).

== Filmography ==
Year	Title	Functioned as			
Year	Title	Director	Writer	Producer	Role
1997	Snake Spring	Yes	Yes	Yes	
1999	The Admirer	Yes	Yes	Yes	
2002	The Star	Yes	Yes	Yes	
2005	The Iris Effect	Yes	Yes	Yes	
2007	Wolfhound	Yes	Yes	Yes	
2008	Apostol (TV, 2008)	Yes	Yes	Yes	
2009	Soundtrack of Passion	Yes	Yes	Yes	
2013	Legend № 17	Yes	Yes	Yes	
2016	Flight Crew	Yes	Yes	Yes	
2023	Nuremberg	Yes	Yes		
2025	Kraken	Yes	Yes		
