= Svetlana Ustinova =

Russian actress (born 1982)

- Светлана Устинова
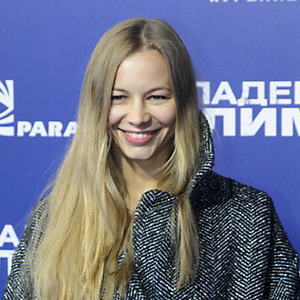
- Svetlana Ustinova at the premiere of Olympus Has Fallen (2013) in Moscow.
- Born: Svetlana Vladimirovna Ustinova; 1 May 1982 (age 44); Severodvinsk, Arkhangelsk Oblast, Russian SFSR, Soviet Union
- Occupation: Actress
- Years active: 2006–present

Svetlana Vladimirovna Ustinova (Russian: Светлана Владимировна Устинова; born 1 May 1982) is a Russian actress, most notable for appearing in the film Boomer. Film 2.

== Early life ==
Ustinova was born in Severodvinsk, Arkhangelsk Oblast, Russian SFSR, Soviet Union (now Russia), the daughter of Tatyana and Vladimir Ustinov. She studied at Severodvinsk school number 28. After grade 7, she went to Severodvinsk City School number 14, from which she graduated in 1999. She was engaged in ballroom dancing. Ustinova studied at Moscow Economics and Statistics University, but in the second year transferred to the Finance Academy. After the fourth year she left the academy and enrolled in the Gerasimov Institute of Cinematography, with Vladimir Grammatikov as professor.

In 2005, having passed the casting, she was approved for the lead role of Dashka in the Pjotr Buslov film Boomer. Movie 2.

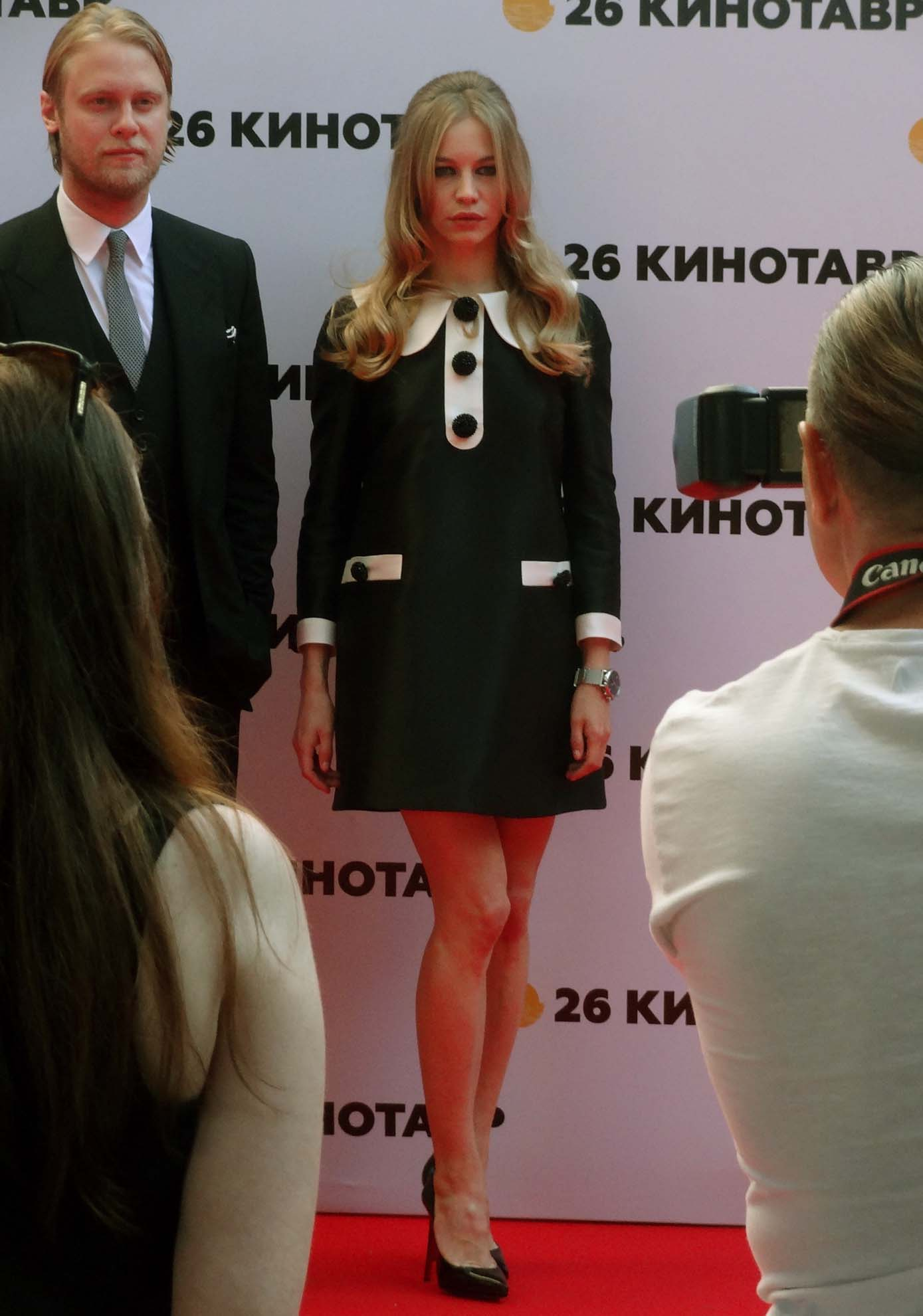
Svetlana Ustinova at the Kinotavr in 2015.

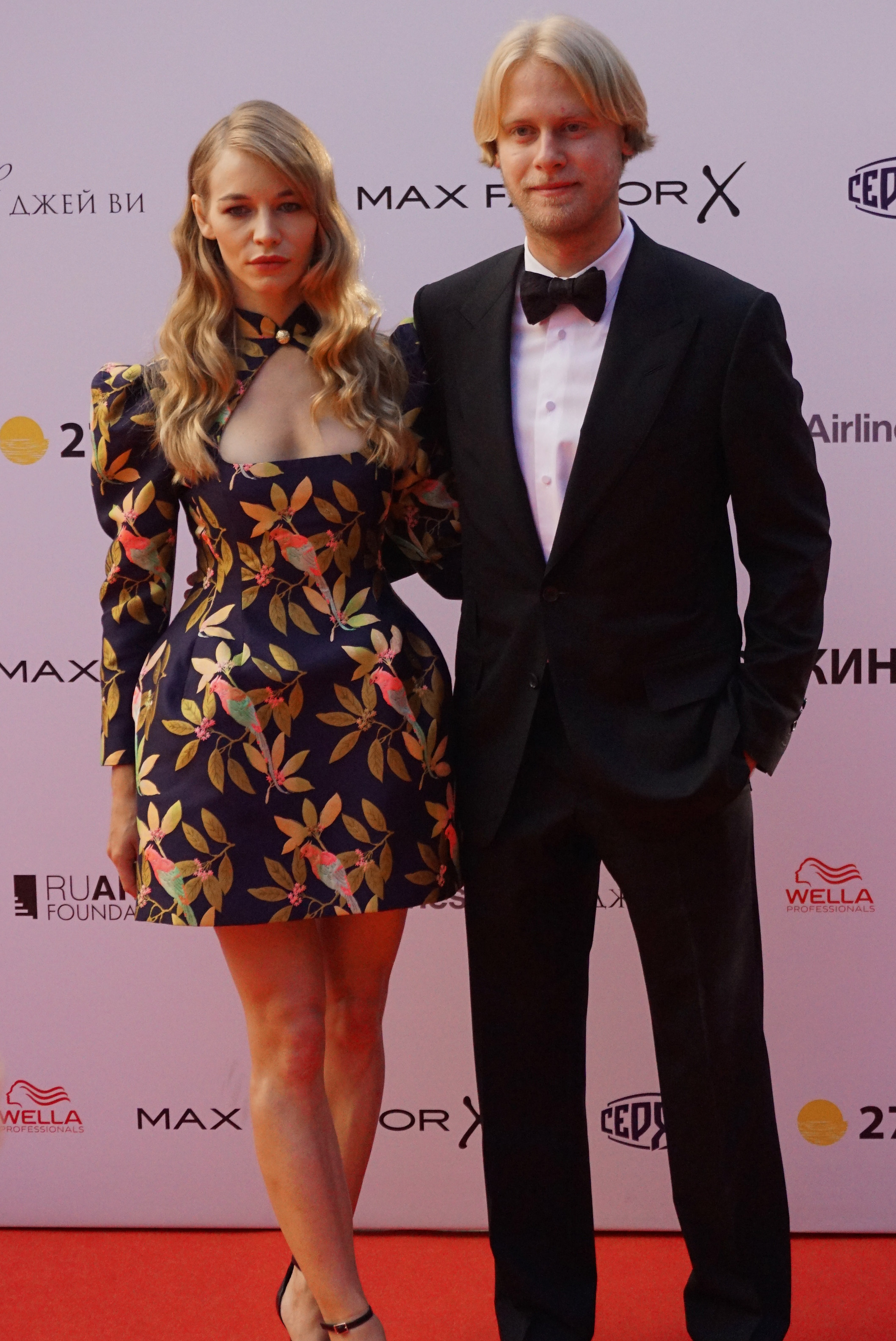
Svetlana Ustinova and Ilya Stewart at the Kinotavr film festival in Sochi, 2016.

== Personal life ==
In 2009, Ustinova married Ukrainian director Mark Gorobets, and subsequently divorced him. She is now in a relationship with producer Ilya (Will) Stewart.

== Filmography ==
Year	Title	Role	Notes
2006	Boomer 2	Dashka	
2007	Mousetrap Law		
2007	Smersh	Pavlinka	TV series
2008	Stories on Human Rights	Nurse	TV series
2008	On the edge of the stand	Alesya	
2009	Prodigal Children	Lida Morozova in youth	TV series
2009	Good Reasons for Murder	Sasha	TV
2009	Well	She	Short
2009	Zhurov	Luba Zaitseva	TV series
2009	Uchastkovaya	Lera	TV series
2010	Golden Trap	Lena	TV series
2010	The Last Meeting	Yulya Khmelyova	TV series
2010	The Capital of Sin	Alena	
2011	Mologa. Russian Atlantis	Anna	TV
2011	Dark Water	Ksyusha Budnikova	TV
2012	Odessa-mother	Irina Volskaya	TV series
2012	Astra, I love you		
2012	The Escape 2	girl from Paradise	TV series
2012	Snipers: Love under the Crosshairs	Lusya Sokolova	TV series
2013	Scout	Zoya	TV series
2013	Rare Blood Group	Natalya Andrievskaya	TV series
2013	Puppeteers	Polina	Mini-series
2013	Secret City	fairy Lana	TV series
2013	Tatort	Elina	TV series
2014	Headhunters	Elena	TV series
2014	Man Without a Past	Lena	TV series
2014	Long Way Home	Alena	TV series
2014	Son of the Father	Vera, bride Vadim	TV series
2015	Hardcore Henry	Olga the Dominatrix	
2016	The Cold Front	Masha Lozinskaya	
2016	The Route Is Calculated	Olga	
2017	Blockbaster	Liza Nifontova	
2019	Baba Yaga: Terror of the Dark Forest	nanny Tatyana / Baba Yaga	
2019	Gold Diggers	Masha Somova	TV series
2021	BOOMERang	Blondinka	
2022	Trigger	Vera	TV series
