= Elizaveta Boyarskaya =

Russian theater and film actress

- Елизавета Боярская
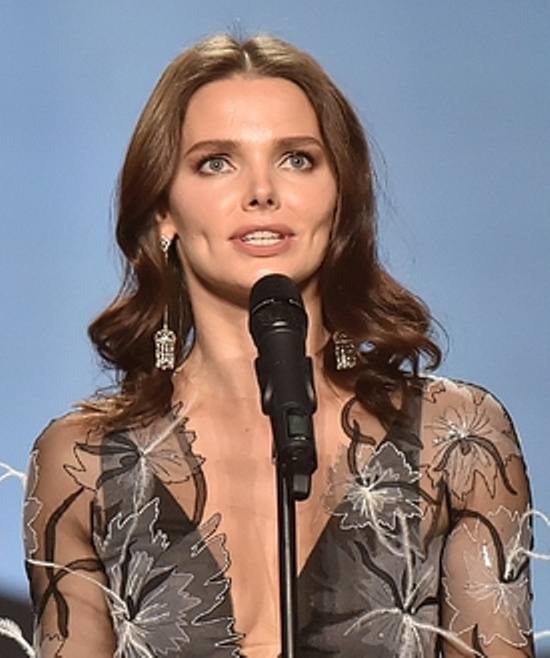
- Boyarskaya in 2017
- Born: Elizaveta Mikhailovna Boyarskaya; 20 December 1985 (age 40); Leningrad, Russian SFSR, Soviet Union (now Saint Petersburg, Russia)
- Occupation: Actress
- Years active: 2001–present
- Spouse: Maksim Matveyev (m. 2010)
- Children: 2

Elizaveta Mikhailovna Boyarskaya (Russian: Елизаве́та Миха́йловна Боя́рская, born 20 December 1985) is a Russian stage and film actress. Honored Artists of the Russian Federation (2018).

== Biography ==
=== Early life and education ===
Was born on 20 December 1985 in Leningrad to a family of two famous Soviet actors Mikhail Boyarsky and Larisa Luppian. Her father is of Russian and Polish descent and her mother is of Estonian, German, Russian and Polish ancestry. As a teenager, she graduated from a modeling school. In secondary school she struggled with her studies, but during the last few years she caught up due to private coaching. Because of this, Elizaveta acquired the knowledge of two foreign languages – English and German. When she was about to graduate, Elizaveta was interested in studying public relations at the Faculty of Journalism at the Saint Petersburg State University. But after attending preparatory courses she lost interest in the field. After visiting the opening of the student theater "On Mokhovoy" and several productions Theatre Lensoveta, Elizaveta decided to enter the Theatre Institute. As Boyarskaya herself later recalled, her parents did not dissuade from such a choice, but warned "about all the hidden obstacles".

Since 2006 she has worked at the Maly Drama Theatre (Theatre of Europe) in St. Petersburg.

It took a few months to prepare for entry into the Saint Petersburg State Theatre Arts Academy. Lev Dodin became her supervisor. During her studies she received the Presidential Scholarship; she graduated SPbGATI in 2007.

=== Career ===
She made her debut in 2001 in the sequel film National Security Agent 3, and in 2004 acted in the German film Downfall.

Her first major role in film was the role of Tanya in the film The First After God, directed by Vasily Chiginsky (2005). Another significant role was that of Vera in the film You Will not Leave Me, directed by Alla Surikova, in which Boyarskaya acted together with her father, Mikhail Boyarsky. She received wide popularity with the 2006 film Park of the Soviet Period and Timur Bekmambetov's movie The Irony of Fate 2 (2007).

It was planned that in the film The Return of the Musketeers, or The Treasures of Cardinal Mazarin Boyarskaya would play the role of daughter of d'Artagnan, but later this role was performed by Lyanka Gryu. She refused this role, because at the same time she simultaneously starred in the film The Admiral and in the 12-episode series I Will Return. In addition, she said she did not find the script by Yungvald-Khilkevich particularly impressive.

In the movie The Admiral (2008), Boyarskaya played Anna Timiryova. She subsequently had roles in the films Do not Tell, Five Brides, Happy New Year, Moms!, Status: Free and Anna Karenina: Vronsky's Story, and in the 2013 TV series Sherlock Holmes.

In 2012, she voiced Baba Yaga in the cartoon Three heroes on the distant shores, and in 2016 gave her voice to the wolf Bianca in the cartoon Sheep and Wolves.

== Personal life ==
Elizaveta Boyarskaya married actor Maksim Matveyev in 2010. On 7 April 2012 Boyarskaya gave birth to her son.

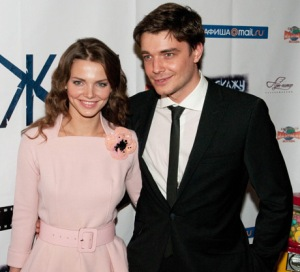
Elizaveta with her husband Maksim Matveyev in 2010

She had another son in 2018.

== Selected filmography ==
Year	Title	Role	Notes
2001	National Security Agent	girl at the bar	TV series
2003	Demon noon	Lena Gladysheva	Mini-series
2004	Downfall	Erna Flegel	
2005	Its another life	Francoise Faberge	TV
2005	First under God	Tanya	
2005	Destructive Power 6	Liza	6 Season, detective series
2006	Don't leave me alone	Vera Nikiforov-Zaritskaya (Verotchka)	
2006	The Storm Gate	Alexandra	Mini-series
2006	Park of Soviet period	Alyona Volkova	
2007	The Irony of Fate 2	Nadya	
2008	Admiral	Anna Timireva	
2009	I'll Be Back	Musia Rastopchina	TV series
2009	Admiral	Anna Timireva	TV series
2009	Small Tragedies	Laura	
2010	Man from Boulevard des Capucinek	Katya	
2010	I Won't Say / Не скажу	Anna	
2011	Peter the Great: The Testament	Maria Cantemir	TV series
2011	Five Brides / Пять невест	Zoya	
2011	Fairytale.Is	mom Dasha	
2011	M.U.R	Inna Muravyova	TV series
2012	The Match / Матч	Anna Shevtsova	
2012	The Three Bogatyrs; Три богатыря на дальних берегах	Baba Yaga	(voice)
2012	Cinderella	One of Cinderella's sisters	
2012	Happy New Year, Moms!	Kseniya	
2013	Courier from Paradise	Veronika	
2013	Sherlock Holmes	Louise Bernett	TV series
2014	The long way home	Lala	TV series
2014	Kuprin	Zenida	Mini-Series
2014	Headhunters	Rita Orlova	TV series
2014	Fugitives	Ustya	
2016	Status: Free	Afina Gordeeva	
2016	Indemnities		
2016	Fantasy White Nights		Mini-Series
2016	Keeper of the way		
2016	Anna Karenina	Anna Karenina	
2016	Drunk Firm		Mini-Series
2017	NO-ONE	Zina	
2018	Vorona	Anna Vorontsova	TV series
2023	Catherine the Great	Catherine II	
