= List of Russian films of 2005 =

A list of films produced in Russia in 2005 (see 2005 in film).

== 2005 ==
Title	Russian title	Director	Cast	Genre	Notes
4		Ilya Khrzhanovsky	Marina Vovchenko, Sergey Shnurov	Drama	
The 9th Company	9 рота	Fyodor Bondarchuk	Artur Smolyaninov, Aleksey Chadov, Konstantin Kryukov	War	About Soviet–Afghan War
Poor Relatives	Бедные родственники	Pavel Lungin	Konstantin Khabensky, Sergei Garmash, Marina Golub	Comedy	
Dead Man's Bluff	Жмурки	Aleksei Balabanov	Nikita Mikhalkov, Aleksei Serebryakov, Dmitri Dyuzhev	Crime, comedy	
Dust	Пыль	Sergei Loban	Aleksei Podolsky	Drama	
Dreaming of Space	Космос как предчувствие	Alexei Uchitel	Yevgeny Mironov, Yevgeny Tsyganov	Drama	Won the Golden George at the 27th Moscow International Film Festival
Escape	Побег	Egor Konchalovsky	Yevgeny Mironov, Aleksey Serebryakov	Crime	
First on the Moon	Первые на Луне	Aleksey Fedorchenko	Aleksei Anisimov	Mockumentary	
Garpastum	Гарпастум	Aleksei German Jr.	Yevgeny Pronin	Drama	
The Italian	Итальянец	Andrei Kravchuk	Kolya Spiridonov	Drama	
Hunting for Asphalt	Охота на асфальте			Drama	
Last Weekend	Последний уик-энд	Pavel Sanayev	Ivan Stebunov, Tatyana Arntgolts	Thriller	
The Master and Margarita	Мастер и Маргарита	Vladimir Bortko	Anna Kovalchuk, Aleksandr Galibin, Oleg Basilashvili, Vladislav Galkin, Sergey Bezrukov	Fantasy, drama	TV miniseries, based on the book of the same name by Mikhail Bulgakov
Mirror Wars: Reflection One	Зеркальные Войны: Отражение Первое	Vasili Chiginsky	Malcolm McDowell	Action	
Order	Заказ	Vera Glagoleva	Nataliya Vdovina, Aleksandr Baluev	Drama	
Popsa	Попса	Elena Nikolaeva	Yelena Velikanova	Drama	
Shadowboxing	Бой с тенью	Aleksei Sidorov	Denis Nikiforov, Yelena Panova, Andrey Panin	Sport drama	
The State Counsellor	Статский советник	Filipp Yankovsky	Oleg Menshikov, Nikita Mikhalkov, Konstantin Khabensky	Detective	Based on the book of the same name by Boris Akunin
The Sun	Солнце	Alexander Sokurov	Issey Ogata	Historical drama	About Japanese emperor Hirohito
The Turkish Gambit	Турецкий гамбит	Dzhanik Faiziyev	Egor Beroev, Olga Krasko	History, Spy	Based on the book of the same name by Boris Akunin
They Chose Freedom	Они выбирали свободу	Vladimir V. Kara-Murza		Documentary	
A Time to Gather Stones	Время собирать камни	Aleksei Karelin	David Bunners, Vladimir Vdovichenkov	War film	

== See also ==
- 2005 in Russia
