= MTV Russia Movie Awards =

Film award

- Awarded for: Best in film
- Country: Russia
- Presented by: MTV Russia
- First award: 2006
- Final award: 2009

The MTV Russia Movie Awards (Before 2009 MTV Movie Awards Russia (Russian: Кинонаграды MTV Россия)) made its debut in 2006 and have celebrated local Russian movies as well as international. The MTV Russia Movie Awards (RMA) is the first event of such kind, featuring local and international actors and movie celebrities being honoured by Russian viewers.

== Host Cities ==
- April 21, 2006 – Oktyabrskiy Theatre, (Moscow) hosted by Dmitry Nagiev and Milla Jovovich
- April 19, 2007 – Pushkinskiy Theatre, (Moscow) hosted by Pamela Anderson and Ivan Urgant
- April 26, 2008 – Pushkinskiy Theatre, (Moscow) hosted by Paris Hilton
- April 23, 2009 – Barvikha Luxury Village Concert Hall, (Barvikha) hosted by Pavel Volya and Kseniya Sobchak

== Award winners ==
=== 2006 ===
Category	Winner(s)	Nominees
Best Movie	Day Watch	The 9th Company; Shadowboxing; From 180 & Taller; The Turkish Gambit
Best Female Performance	Jeanna Friske – Day Watch	Irina Rakhmanova – The 9th Company; Yelena Panova – Shadowboxing; Olga Krasko – The Turkish Gambit; Oksana Fandera – The State Counsellor
Best Male Performance	Aleksey Chadov – The 9th Company	Mikhail Porechenkov – The 9th Company; Denis Nikiforov – Shadowboxing; Egor Beroev – The Turkish Gambit; Konstantin Khabensky – Day Watch
Best Comedic Performance	Dmitri Dyuzhev – Dead Man's Bluff	Evgeniy Stychkin – From 180 & Taller; Alexander Lykov – The 9th Company; Marat Basharov – The Turkish Gambit; Nikita Mikhalkov – Dead Man's Bluff
Best Cast	The 9th Company	Day Watch; Dead Man's Bluff; The State Counsellor; The Turkish Gambit
Best Villain	Viktor Verzhbitsky – Day Watch	Gosha Kutsenko – From 180 & Taller; Andrei Panin – Shadowboxing; Alexander Lykov – The Turkish Gambit; Valeri Zolotukhin – Day Watch
Best Breakthrough Performance	Artur Smolyaninov – The 9th Company	Konstantin Kryukov – The 9th Company; Denis Nikiforov – Shadowboxing; Jeanna Friske – Day Watch; Elizaveta Boyarskaya – The First After God
Best Kiss	Konstantin Khabensky & Maria Poroshina – Day Watch	Paratroopers kiss feet of "Snow White" (I. Rakhmanova) – The 9th Company; Yevgeny Stychkin & Ksenia Knyazeva – From 180 & Taller; Denis Nikiforov & Yelena Panova – Shadowboxing; Konstantin Khabensky & Oksana Fandera – The State Counsellor
Best Fight	Last fighting against Mujahideen – The 9th Company	Artyom Kolchin vs. cash-in-transit guards – Shadowboxing; Egor vs. Svetlana; scene with balls – Day Watch; Escape of escorted prisoners – Escape; Erast Fandorin vs. Perepyolkin in Istanbul – The Turkish Gambit
Best Soundtrack	Nogu Svelo! – "Idem na Vostok" (The Turkish Gambit)	TOKiO – "Kto ya bez tebya" (The 9th Company); Triplex & Apocalyptica - "Shadowboxing" (Shadowboxing); Seryoga - "King Ring" (Shadowboxing); Gorod 312 - "Ostanus" (Day Watch)
Best Foreign Movie	Mr. & Mrs. Smith	Star Wars: Episode III – Revenge of the Sith; The Ring Two; Meet the Fockers; King Kong
Best Cartoon	Madagascar	The SpongeBob SquarePants Movie; Robots; Howl's Moving Castle; Chicken Little
Best Action Sequence	Crash of the buildings in Moscow (Day Watch)	Plane crash at the airport in Afghanistan (The 9th Company); World championship fight (Shadowboxing); Sea fight with the German convoy The First After God; Erast Fandorin and Varya Suvorova fly in a balloon (The Turkish Gambit)
Generation Award	Sergei Bodrov, Jr. (Posthumously)	

=== 2007 ===
Category	Winner(s)	Nominees
Best Movie	Bastards	Bimmer 2; Wolfhound; Heat; Piter FM
Best Female Performance	Ekaterina Fedulova – Piter FM	Agnija Ditkovskytė – Heat; Renata Litvinova – It Doesn't Hurt Me; Svetlana Ustinova – Bimmer 2; Yekaterina Guseva – Flash.card
Best Male Performance	Aleksey Chadov – Alive	Vladimir Mashkov – Hunting Piranha; Evgeny Tsyganov – Piter FM; Alexander Bukharov – Wolfhound; Vladimir Vdovichenkov – Bimmer 2
Best Comedic Performance	Vladimir Tolokonnikov – Khottabych	Deni Dadaev – Heat; Mikhail Yefremov – Tochka; Gosha Kutsenko – Dikari; Vladimir Mashkov – Piter FM
Best Cast	Alive	Heat; The Island; Hunting Piranha; Bastards
Best Villain	Yevgeny Mironov – Hunting Piranha	Alexey Gorbunov – The Sword Bearer; Aleksandr Domogarov – Wolfhound; Andrey Merzlikin – Bimmer 2; Evgeniya Kryukova – The Power of Fear
Best Breakthrough Performance	Aleksandr Golovin – Bastards	Agnija Ditkovskytė – Heat; Ekaterina Fedulova – Piter FM; Aleksey Chadov – Alive; Alexander Bukharov – Wolfhound
Best Kiss	Aleksey Chadov & Agnija Ditkovskytė – Heat	Sergey Bezrukov & Lan Yan – Potseluy babochki; Mikhail Porechenkov & Anna Mikhalkova – Svyaz; Artyom Tkachenko & Chulpan Khamatova – The Sword Bearer; Alexander Bukharov & Oksana Akinshina– Wolfhound
Best Fight	Wolfhound and Luchezar vs. Zhadoba – Wolfhound	Kir vs Corrupt finance official – Alive; Father Anatoly vs. Demon in Nastya's body; exorcism scene – The Island; Fight in prison cell – Bastards; Khottabych vs. Shaytanych in virtual reality – Khottabych
Best Soundtrack	Gorod 312 - "Vne zony dostupa" (Piter FM)	Alisa – "Na poroge neba" (Wolfhound); TOKiO – "Kogda ty plachesh" (Heat); Splean - "Romance" (Alive); Ligalize - "Svolochi" (Bastards)
Best Foreign Movie	Pirates of the Caribbean: Dead Man's Chest	The Devil Wears Prada; Casino Royale; Perfume: The Story of a Murderer; Saw III
Best Cartoon	Ice Age: The Meltdown	Dobrynya Nikitich and Zmey Gorynych; Prince Vladimir; Over the Hedge; Open Season
Best Action Sequence	German military base destruction (Bastards)	Sasha's invisible sword cuts through pines and flying helicopter's tail (The Sword Bearer); Father Anatoly banishes from the island the girl, who sought a blessing for abortion (The Island); Gunfight in the roadside barbecue restaurant of Shantarsk city (Hunting Piranha); Moidodyrka gets thrown out of the police UAZ car (Tochka)
Generation Award	Sergei Solovyov	

== See also ==
- MTV Russian Music Awards
- MTV Networks Europe
