= Shadowboxing 3: Last Round =

- Directed by: Aleksey Sidorov
- Written by: Aleksey Sidorov
- Produced by: Ruben Dishdishyan
- Starring: Denis Nikiforov; Yelena Panova; Andrey Panin; Pavel Derevyanko
- Cinematography: Dmitry Yashonkov
- Edited by: Igor Otdelnov
- Music by: Maksim Zolotov
- Distributed by: Central Partnership
- Release dates: 11 November 2011 (Moscow premiere); 17 November 2011 (Russia)
- Running time: 127 Minutes
- Country: Russia
- Language: Russian / English
- Budget: $6,200,000
- Box office: $13,645,556

Shadowboxing 3: Last Round (Russian: Бой с тенью 3D: Последний раунд, romanized: Boy s tenyu 3D: Posledniy raund; literally "Fight with Shadow 3") is a 2011 Russian sports drama movie.

The film is a sequel to Shadowboxing from 2005 and Shadowboxing 2 from 2007.

== Plot ==
After four years, boxer champion Artyom Kolchin has reached all conceivable peaks and became a national hero. He no longer appears in the ring, preferring coaching and a lively social life with constant appearances on television, parties and intrigues. At home during the mornings he is joined by his daughter Pauline and wife Vika, who no longer recognizes in him the Artyom with whom she once fell in love with. Vika begins to feel that she has fallen out of love with Artyom and leaves him.

Outwardly prosperous existence Kolchin comes to an end when his protegee Oleg is almost killed by the famous Philippines boxer Antonio Cuerte in battle. Artyom suspects that he uses some illegal drugs. For the evidence he has to go to Hong Kong, where his old acquaintance Vagit Valiev waits for him: he knows something about Cuerte what no one else knows. Valiev sends a mobile phone to Artyom which he uses to keep in contact with him, and invites him for a visit. But on arrival in Hong Kong, Artyom is arrested for smuggling drugs and then faces a murder attempt.

Having miraculously withstood and survived the persecution of the police and the mafia, Artyom meets Vagit. It turns out that Cuerte is a genetically modified person; result of experiments from a secret triad laboratory led by the mysterious Lee Ho. To obtain evidence, the protagonist, along with Vagit and his girlfriend Sun, goes into the jungle. He manages to find the laboratory and talk with its leader Professor Bastian.

After wanderings through the jungle, Artyom falls into the hands of the police, where he is brought back out by Colonel of FSKN Nechaev, who arrived in Hong Kong as part of a drug sting operation. To defeat the enemies Artyom has to return home, and then again enter the ring. In battle, Kolchin struggles and is using up his last strength. Cuerte is ready to kill him, but Artyom remembers that the Filipino is a mutant who has been implanted with a snake's genome, and a snake reacts only to movements. Kolchin raises his hand and Cuerte responds to the movement. He, in a jump, wants to hit Artyom with his fatal blow, but misses a crushing uppercut in the jaw and falls into a heavy knockout. Kolchin again becomes the champion. Right after the battle Artyom wants to slay the killer of the triads, but Nechayev arrests him. After that, world champion Artyom Kolchin offers Cuerte to tell him what the crazy doctor did to him. After the victory, Artyom receives the title of world champion, his wife Vika returns to him, and his pupil Oleg gets up from a wheelchair, inspired by the victory of Artyom. After some time, to Artyom's house comes a package containing a phone to which Vagit calls, who is already in Alaska together with Sun.

== Cast ==
- Denis Nikiforov as Artyom Kolchin
- Yelena Panova as Vika
- Andrey Panin as Valiyev
- Pavel Derevyanko as Timokha
- Batu Khasikov as Antonio Cuerte
- Mikhail Gorevoy as Michael
- Sofya Mitskevich as Polina
- Yevgeni Ponasenkov as TV director

== Production ==
Shadowboxing 3 was shot in 2D and converted in 3D in post-production. The film was shot in Moscow, Hong Kong, Thailand and Norway.
