= Aleksey Sidorov =

Russian film director, screenwriter and producer (born 1968)

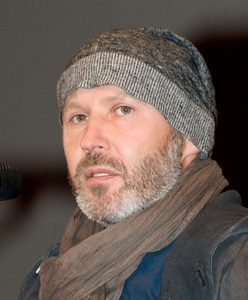
- Born: Aleksey Leonidovich Sidorov; August 22, 1968 (age 58); Severodvinsk, Soviet Union (now Russia)
- Citizenship: Russian Federation
- Occupations: film director, screenwriter, producer

Aleksey Leonidovich Sidorov (Russian: Алексе́й Леони́дович Си́доров; born August 22, 1968) is a Russian film director, screenwriter and producer.

== Biography ==
Aleksey was born in Severodvinsk. He studied at the Faculty of Philology of Petrozavodsk University, after which he moved to Moscow and began attending courses for scriptwriters and directors. He made his film debut in 2002.

== Filmography ==
- Brigada (2002)
- Shadowboxing (2005)
- Shadowboxing 2: Revenge (2007)
- Shadowboxing 3: Last Round (2011)
- 22 Minutes (2014)
- T-34 (2019)
- Champion of the World (2021)
