= Mikhail Gorevoy =

Russian actor (born 1965)

- Михаил Горевой
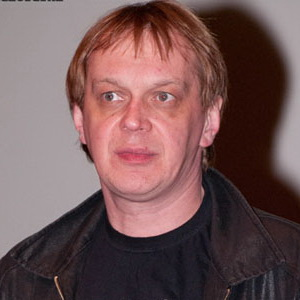
- Mikhail Gorevoy, 2010
- Born: Mikhail Vitalievich Gorevoy; 19 May 1965 (age 61); Moscow, RSFSR, USSR
- Citizenship: Russia
- Education: Moscow Art Theater
- Occupations: Actor, director, teacher
- Years active: 1988-present

Mikhail Vitalievich Gorevoy (Russian: Михаи́л Вита́льевич Горево́й; born 19 May 1965) is a Russian actor, occasionally credited as Michael Gor in English language productions, best known internationally for playing Vladimir Popov in the James Bond film Die Another Day. He also played the role of Ivan Alexandrovich Schischkin in Bridge of Spies.

== Early life ==
Mikhail Gorevoy graduated with honors from the Moscow Art Theater School in 1987, and began his acting career in theater at the Sovremennik Theatre.

== Career ==
His film debut was in the 1988 Russian film Step (directed by Alexander Mitta). He traveled to the United States in 1992, living in New York City and Boston, where he worked various jobs including teaching the Stanislavski method. Gorevoy returned to Russia in 1996 and established his own theater. He continues to act in film.

== Personal life ==
Gorevoy has one son, Dmitriy, who is also an actor.

== Filmography ==
| Year | Title | Role | Notes |
|---|---|---|---|
| 1988 | A Step | Venka | |
| 1989 | Gran | | |
| 1992 | Alyaska, ser! | | |
| 1993 | Auktsion | Sidorov | |
| 1996 | President i ego zhenshchina | Aleks | |
| 2002 | Die Another Day | Vladimir Popov | |
| 2003 | Antikiller 2: Antiterror | | |
| 2005 | Mirror Wars | Manfred | |
| 2005 | Male Season: Velvet Revolution | Clerk | |
| 2006 | Space Race | Ivan Serov | 2 episodes, TV Series documentary |
| 2006 | Shift | Markov | |
| 2006 | Tochka | | |
| 2007 | Begushchaya po volnam | Captain Ghez | |
| 2008 | Yarik | Buyer | TV film |
| 2008 | Shadowboxing 2: Revenge | Michael Lewinsky | |
| 2009 | The Best Movie 2 | Gorbunov | |
| 2009 | Way | Man in black | |
| 2009 | LOpuKHI | Pomoshchnik Bossa | |
| 2009 | Hooked on the Game | Viktor Pokrovskiy | |
| 2009 | Kromov | Goncharov | |
| 2010 | The House of the Sun | KGB officer | |
| 2010 | Na igre 2. Novyy uroven | Pokrovskiy | |
| 2011 | Five Brides | Kuzichev | |
| 2011 | Varene iz sakury | Lender | |
| 2011 | Shadowboxing 3: Last Round | Michael Lewinsky | |
| 2012 | Moms | | (segment "Ya – ne Kolya" ) |
| 2012 | Nightingale – Robber | Grigory Polyakov | |
| 2014 | Chempiony | Trener | |
| 2014 | Some Like It Cold | Igor Leonidovich | |
| 2014 | Is Light on Sight | Boris | |
| 2014 | Fort Ross | Kapitan Piratov | |
| 2015 | Bridge of Spies | Ivan Schischkin | |
| 2016 | Skiptrace | Dima | |
| 2017 | The Hitman's Bodyguard | Livitin | |
| 2018 | Svideteli | "Skripka" – Richard | |
| 2018 | Papa, sdokhni | Yevgenich | |
| 2018 | Unforgiven | Vladimir Savchuk | |
| 2018 | Hunter Killer | Admiral Dmitriy Durov | |
| 2019 | Kaddish | Richard | |
| 2019 | A Historical Mistake | Leon Trotsky | |
| 2020 | Translation from German | Porfiry Ignatievich Veresen | |
| 2022 | Kompromat | Rostov | |
