= Bastards (2006 film) =

2006 Russian coming-of-age war film

- DVD cover
- Directed by: Aleksandr Atanesyan
- Written by: Aleksandr Atanesyan (co-writer); Vladimir Kunin
- Starring: Andrey Panin; Andrey Krasko; Sergei Rychenkov
- Cinematography: Dmitry Yashonkov
- Edited by: Tchavdar Georgiev; William S. Scharf
- Music by: Arkady Ukupnik
- Release date: 2 February 2006
- Running time: 94 minutes
- Country: Russia
- Languages: Russian, German
- Budget: $2.5 million

Bastards (Russian: Сволочи, romanized: Svolochi) is a 2006 Russian coming-of-age war film.

== Synopsis ==
In 1943, in the Soviet Union, a group of teenage convicts are secretly trained for a guerrilla mission to stop the actions of a German army group called "Edelweiss".

== Plot summary ==
The story is set in the Soviet Union during the Second World War in the year 1943. Colonel Vishnevetskiy is released from prison to organize a school of military training for saboteurs. Students, 14–15 years old criminals, come from prisons and correction colonies. After harsh training, they are sent to destroy a German oil depot deep in the Carpathian mountains.

== Controversy ==
The film's release caused massive controversy in Russia, where some deemed it "state-supported anti-Soviet propaganda". The plot for the film, written by Kunin, involved a story of teenagers with a criminal background who were caught by the NKVD during the Great Patriotic War, then trained as saboteurs in special schools and thrown into the German countryside to face a certain death.

After the film was shown in Russia, the Federal Security Service responded with a press release, stating that archives of security services of Russia and Kazakhstan do not have any documents confirming the existence of "kid saboteur schools", and that there are no archive documents about missions to send saboteur groups consisting of teenagers into the adversary's rear. They stated that archive documents evidence that the use of kids in saboteur purposes by special services of Nazi Germany.

While the advertising campaign of the film claimed it was based on real accounts, after the controversy arose, both the writer and the director confessed the plot was mere fiction.

While the film won the MTV Movie Awards, Russia for 2007, the famous director Vladimir Menshov refused to hand over the award:

Mr. Menshov gasped as he read the contents of the envelope, looked up and said: "I'm not going to hand over an award to a film that discredits my country, let Pamela Anderson (another of the evening's presenters) do it instead". He then turned, dropped the envelope and stalked offstage, refusing to comment further. MTV Russia broadcast the ceremony live.

Dmitry Puchkov commented on the film making:

The sum of USD 700,000 was immediately released by the state to shoot this ideological carrion. The Minister of Culture Shvydkoy claimed that "the artist has a right to fiction". Certainly, that's excellent. It's only unclear, why on earth the artist has the right to shit on heads of his compatriots for the money of those citizens, that were paid as taxes and spent to shoot the film Svolochi.

Puchkov also sarcastically commented on the information that Russian school students were obligated to watch this film: "Have our children to know the history of the country? Well, now they know it: if anything happens, they would be caught and sent to face certain death."
