= Secrets of Investigation =

- TV poster
- Also known as: Тайны следствия
- Genre: Criminal; Detective; Drama
- Composer: Yevgeni Fedorov
- Country of origin: Russia
- No. of seasons: 26
- No. of episodes: 444 (220 films)

Production
- Executive producers: Alexander Levin; Boris Kokin
- Running time: 30–52 minutes
- Production companies: TeleRoman; Panorama Studio; Forward Film

Original release
- Release: September 1, 2000 – present

Secrets of Investigation (Russian: Тайны следствия) is a Russian television series filmed from 2000 through 2018. The format of the series features 2 to 4 50 minutes episodes arranged into story clusters. The television series follows the work of Chief Detective Maria Shvetsova (played by Anna Kovalchuk) of a St.Petersburg Saint Petersburg District IC Investigative Committee of Russia. As of 2026, the series contains 444 episodes (of 21 seasons).

== Plot ==
The Office of the District IC at one of the districts of Saint Petersburg investigates the most difficult crimes. Possibly, many of these affairs would have remained unsolved, if not for the talent and sharp senses (including sense of humor) of the Chief Detective Maria Sergeevna Shvetsova and her team.

== Episodes ==
=== Secrets of Investigationa (2000–01) ===
- Soft Paw of Death
- Coffin for Two
- Strangeness of Alisa
- Women's Tears
- Another's Cross
- Trainee

=== Secrets of Investigation 2 (2002) ===
- The Сlient
- Saturday, 3 PM
- The Fall
- Puppets
- Role of the Victim
- Black God

=== Secrets of Investigation 3 (2003) ===
- Hostages
- Disappearance
- Paperwork
- Sheep's Clothing
- Attempted Murder
- Third too Many

=== Secrets of Investigation 4 (2004) ===
- True Values
- Operation 'Doctor'
- Correction of Mistakes
- Come on, Baby, let's Joyride
- Case Нistory
- Weapon Сhoice

=== Secrets of Investigation 5 (2005) ===
- Admirers
- Who is Who
- Photographer
- Decent People
- Death Out of Frame
- Problems of Up Bringing

=== Secrets of Investigation 6 (2006) ===
- Personnel
- Funny Little Elephant
- The Sound of Music
- Witness Protection
- Period of Limitation
- Challenge

=== Secrets of Investigation 7 (2007) ===
- Black Magic
- Expensive Present
- The Best Protective Device
- Kindred Bonds
- Homeward
- Three Days

=== Secrets of Investigation 8 (2008) ===
- Exceeding Аuthority
- Family Вusiness
- All Rise!
- Collectors
- Risk Group
- Acknowledgement of Guilt

=== Secrets of Investigation 9 (2010–11) ===
Secrets of the investigation 9 After the reorganization of the prosecutor's office a major problem for Shevtsova is still Nikolai Filonov. He is doing utmost in his power to avoid or get rid of complex and unsolved cases in his district.

- (49) 1 Protection Polezhaeva
- (50) 2 Death for Official use Only
- (51) 3 Millionaire in the Slums
- (52) 4 Triangle of Hate
- (53) 5 Product – money-commodity
- (54) 6 The Hitcher
- (55) 7 Santa Claus in Anger
- (56) 8 Blood and Ketchup
- (57) 9 Wicked Code
- (58) 10 Confession
- (59) 11 Family Values
- (60) 12 Six Million Witnesses

=== Secrets of Investigation 10 (2011) ===
District IC Investigative Committee of Russia headed by Nikolai Filonov (Senior Advisor of Justice) would long have turned into the organization for the collection of statistical crime related data, if not for Maria Shvetsova and her colleagues – experienced homicide detectives Vinokurov & Kurochkin. Maria is not afraid to take the initiative and, in spite of irritation of Vinokourov, she always prefers to go to the scene herself in order to interview witnesses and gather evidence. And often, it is only she whose watchful eye manages to catch the details that eventually lead to solving crimes. Without her participation of the strange death of the director of thriving "Autlink" would have been qualified as a simple accident. However demanding Shvetsova insists on forensic expertise and establishes the true cause of death of Nikanorov. Shvetsova used to always trust her sensitive intuition that helps her, even if the mere facts are not enough. Thus, having begun the investigation of the murder of the owner of the collection of antique coins Florinskaya – she pretty quickly discovers that the prime suspect, whose "candidacy" is insistently being suggested to her by the relatives and friends of the deceased, has actually nothing to do with this crime. Maria Shevtsova always tries to see into the case from different sides, and then the true motives of the murder come to the surface. In some cases, the work of the investigator comes to scrutinizing all evidence collected at the crime scene; and sometimes becomes a real puzzle. However, by restoring the true picture of the crime, Maria manages not only to find the culprits, but also to prevent a new crime. Meanwhile, Maria's boss Nikolai Filonov remains concerned solely with his own career growth. For the sake of promotion he is ready to pull the brakes on any "uncomfortable" case. A principled and stubborn nature of Shevtsova's may cause considerable inconveniences to such superior; so each case for Maria Sergeevna may be the last.

- (61) 1 Hot Pursuit
- (62) 2 Alien Door
- (63) 3 Inverted Jenny
- (64) 4 Black Mark
- (65) 5 Thieve's Blood
- (66) 6 Blood for Blood
- (67) 7 Suspected Jeep
- (68) 8 The love of Money at First Sight
- (69) 9 Let Bygones be Bygones
- (70) 10 Gop-Stop
- (71) 11 Do Not Sit on the Table
- (72) 12 Golden Case

=== Secrets of Investigation 11 ===
The body of Vygotsky, a CEO of an esteemed beer brewery worth $500 million, is found on the doorsteps of a restaurant. His wife and mistress will fight for the vacant director's chair. Maria has to figure out which one of them is involved in the murder. Fortunately, Shevtsova is always readily helped by her colleagues – experienced homicide detectives Vladimir Vinokurov and Fedor Kurochkin. Further on the Petersburg investigative committee will discover a strange crime – the murder of a former skipper Glebov poisoned by an unknown neuroprotective drug. In her personal life, Maria has full support of her family – her loving husband Dmitry Luganskiy and daughter Zlata. Owing to their support, as well as to her outstanding abilities Maria never succumbs to the difficulties of investigation of the most difficult crimes. In some cases a new employee of the Committee, investigator Lyudmila Kolinskaya is actively involved. She had been personally employed by the boss of the investigative committee Filonov, the man relations with whom for Shevtsova are still uneasy.

- (73) 1 Transferable Beer
- (74) 2 The Last Hours
- (75) 3 The Power of Sound
- (76) 4 Maestro
- (77) 5 Triangle Story
- (78) 6 Cyclist's Afterlife

=== Secrets of investigation 12 (2012) ===
- (79) 1 Extra
- (80) 2 Non-Human
- (81) 3 Four Women
- (82) 4 Parent's Day
- (83) 5 Relic
- (84) 6 Panacea

=== Secrets of Investigation 13 (2013) ===
Under the leadership of Kovin Maria finally gets the required degree of freedom, that for so long was dreamed of at the times the superior chair was held by her longtime foe Filonov. Assessing the benefits of the new situation, she is reconciled to the fact that her own merits as a leader again, have not been evaluated "at the top ", and with her head dipped in the cases, the flow of which does not dry out for a minute – she continues investigating.

- (85) 1 Cabby
- (86) 2 Wicked Love
- (87) 3 Maniac
- (88) 4 Bad Money
- (89) 5 Secret Facility
- (90) 6 Crash
- (91) 7 Ice Month
- (92) 8 Family's Black Sheep
- (93) 9 Maracas
- (94) 10 Dear Wife

=== Secrets of investigation 14 (2014) ===
- (95) 1 Wild Child
- (96) 2 Blackmail
- (97) 3 Heart Failure
- (98) 4 Еxtra People
- (99) 5 Wig
- (100) 6 Good Man
- (101) 7 Сoncoctions
- (102) 8 Delivery

=== Secrets of Investigation 15 (2015) ===
- (103) 1 From Scratch
- (104) 2 The Boy with the Violin
- (105) 3 Surest Means
- (106) 4 Short Circuit
- (107) 5 Moon in Scorpio
- (108) 6 Debtor
- (109) 7 Death Mask
- (110) 8 Mixed Feelings

=== Secrets of Investigation 16 (2016) ===
- (111) 1 Black List
- (112) 2 Vicious Circle
- (113) 3 Love Should be Нappy
- (114) 4 The Shadow of the Past
- (115) 5 Personal Interests
- (116) 6 Death of the Poet
- (117) 7 The Last Call
- (118) 8 The Inner Circle
- (119) 9 Decide
- (120) 10 Father

=== Secrets of Investigation 17 (2017) ===
Shvetsova continues to work as a public defender at the Zanevsky SC, simultaneously helping her first husband Andrew with a divorce, during which she discovers signs of fraud by his new wife, and also tries to guide the girl Liza on the right path and maintain relationships with children. Meanwhile, the new investigator Boris Shipov, who has his own methods and ideas about the work of the investigator, is being transferred to Zanevsky Investigation Center from Rostov.

- (121) 1-2 Cat and Mouse
- (122) 3-4 Insomnia
- (123) 5-6 Without Statute of limitations
- (124) 7-8 Conditioned Reflex
- (125) 9-10 Caprice
- (126) 11-12 Worthy Representative
- (127) 13-14 Final Stop
- (128) 15-16 Woman for Two
- (129) 17-18 Explicit Motive
- (130) 19-20 Family Scene
- (131) 21-22 The Case of Jogging
- (132) 23-24 Virus

=== Secrets of Investigation 18 (2018) ===
On May 1, 2018, filming of the 18th season.

In the new season, detective Maria Sergeyevna Shvetsova works on various cases, such as the poisoning during the birthday party of businessman Lunyov, an uncovered mass grave in the city center, the murder of an artist, and the crimes committed by a local gang.

This season there are scenes of memories of various episodic characters, which has not yet happened.

- (133) 1-2 Ready to Kill
- (134) 3-4 Evening News
- (135) 5-6 Trail of a Wolf
- (136) 7-8 The Abduction of the Bride
- (137) 9-10 The Awakening of the Devil
- (138) 11-12 Self-portrait of the artist Arnoldov
- (139) 13-14 True Love
- (140) 15-16 God's Dandelion
- (141) 17-18 Hunting Season
- (142) 19-20 Line of Death
- (143) 21-22 Visit of the Ghost
- (144) 23-24 The third in the hood

=== Secrets of Investigation. 19th century ===
On October 6, 2018, filming began on a spin-off and prequel on the series Secrets of Investigation. Last century.

== Cast ==
- Anna Kovalchuk as Maria Shvetsova, investigator, senior investigator, 3 – 7 seasons – Deputy Prosecutor of the Central district of St. Petersburg, with 8 of the season – the investigator of the Investigative Committee of the Central (9 seasons – Zanevsky) area (1–14 th season);
- Aleksandr Novikov as detective Fyodor Kurochkin (1–14 seasons);
- Vyacheslav Zakharov as Viktor Kovin, the prosecutor of the Central District of St. Petersburg, the head of the Investigative Committee of the Zanevsky district (1–9 minutes, 12–14 minutes seasons);
- Sergey Baryshev as Vladimir Vinokurov, Head of the Criminal Investigation Department (slaughter the department) Central (9th season – Zanevsky) police station (Season 1–11);
- Yulia Yakovleva as Zoya Pavlovna, Secretary Covin (1–10 minutes, 12–14 minutes seasons);
- Alla Dovlatova as Albina Krutitskaya best friend Shvetsova (1–3, 7 seasons);
- Aleksandr Chevychelov as Andrey Pavlovich Perevalov first husband Shvetsova (Season 1.8);
- Emiliya Spivak as a former investigator, lawyer Evgenia, the former (mentioned in the 12th season) wife Vinokourov (Season 1–8)
- Miroslav Malich as Dmitry Lugansky, businessman second husband Shvetsova (Season 2–14);
- Oleg Almazov as Anton Aleksandrovich Starosel'tsev journalist, Zoe's husband (2nd, 4–14 th season);
- Andrey Sharkov as Leonid Panov, the medical examiner (1–14 seasons);
- Igor Grigoriev as Nikolay Filonov, investigator, prosecutor of the zone, in the 8th season – the head of the Investigation Division (1–12, 14th season), Senior Adviser (with 17 of the 10 series of the season the Colonel) Justice;
- Yevgeny Chudakov as Ivan Belyaev, a senior investigator, a veteran of Justice (Season 3–8);
- Galina Mamchistova as Nina Belyaeva Fyodorovna, the wife of Ivan (Season 3–8);
- Aleksandr Shpilko as Peter Anisimovich Buevich, investigator, then the Investigative Committee (Season 3–8 9–10 seasons – episodes);
- Svetlana Shchedrina as Olga Tsvetkova, the secretary of the district court, investigator, prosecutor (4–9 Season 2 Season – cameo, 10th season – in the film Gold Business);
- Igor Nikolaev as ORB detective Leonid Korablev

=== Crew ===
- Written by: Elena Topilskaya (1–8), Dmitry Parmenov (9–11), Dmitry Kamorin (12–13)
- Directed by : Ilya Makarov (1–2), Alexander Burtsev (3–5), Michael Vasserbaum (5–11), Alexei Bogdanov (9), Natalia Savchenko (10), Renata Gritskova (12–13), Andrei Elinson (13), Olga Kandidatova (13)
- Director of Photography: Stepan Kovalenko (1), Alexander Korneev (2, 4), Gregory Panov (2–3), Leonid Vasilev (3, 5), Alexey Chugunov (5–13), Jaroslav Protsko (9–10)
- Composer:Yevgeni Fedorov
- Producer: Ada Staviskaya
- Co-producers: Olga Maneeva (1), Andrey Kamorin (2–3)

== Awards ==
- TEFI 2016: Best Daytime television series
