= Yelena Zakharova =

Russian actress

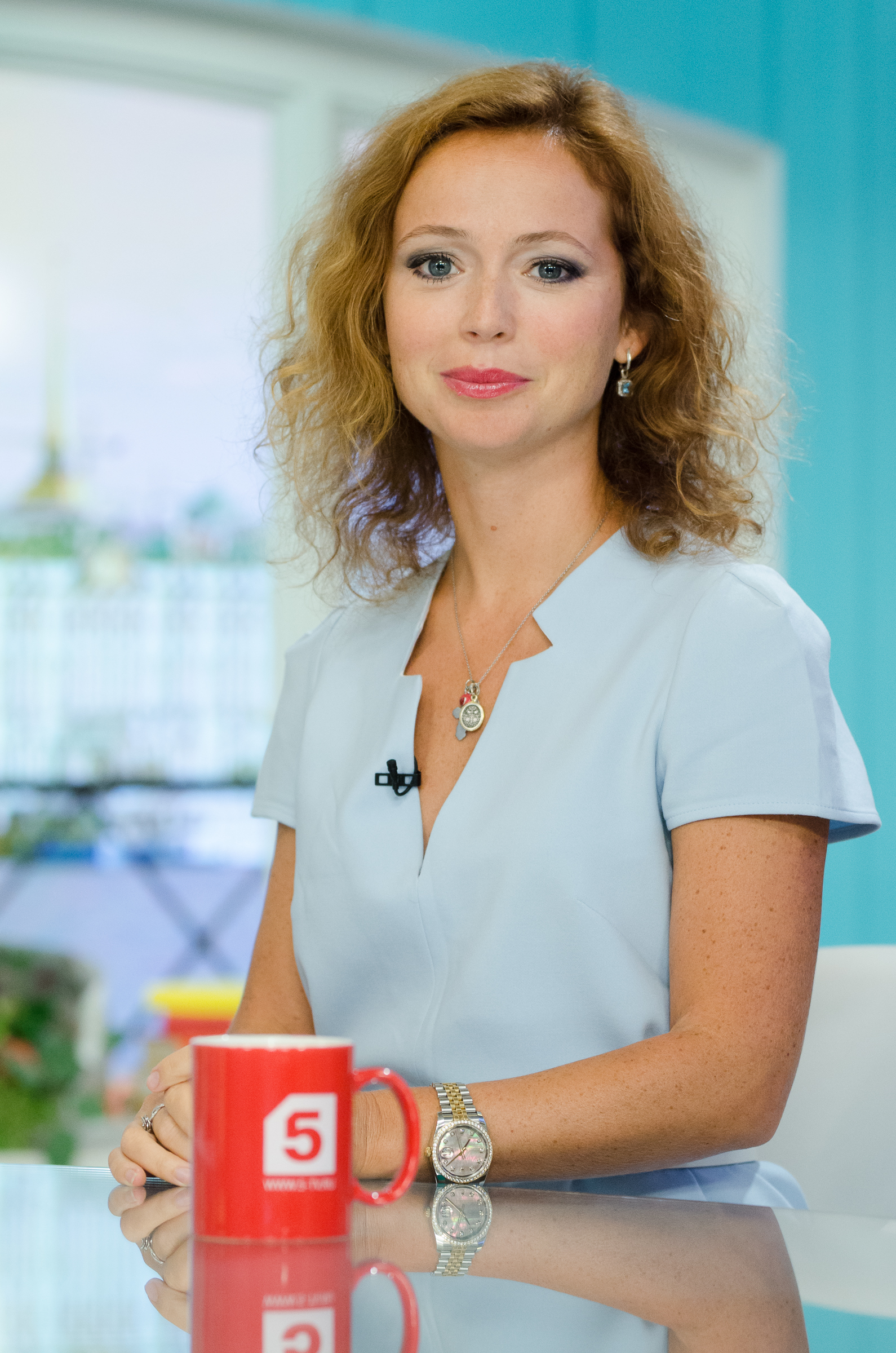
- In TV show Morning at Petersburg – Channel 5, 2016
- Born: Yelena Igorevna Zakharova; 2 November 1975 (age 50); Moscow, RSFSR, USSR
- Occupation: Actress
- Years active: 1995–present
- Partner: Sergey Mamontov (2009–2011)
- Children: 2 daughters (1 deceased)
- Parent(s): Igor Zakharov; Natalya Zakharova

Yelena Igorevna Zakharova (Russian: Еле́на И́горевна Заха́рова; born 2 November 1975) is a Russian theater and film actress.

== Biography ==
Was born in Moscow, they lived near the park Sokolniki. Then mother gave her in classical ballet, but there she has studied very little. With a career in classical ballet did not happen. At school, she loved the Russian language, literature and foreign languages. At school, she dreamed of becoming a model. At school I started acting in movies.

In the course of the Boris Shchukin School he played the role in the film Vicky Alexander Alexandrov "Shelter comedians". After graduating from college in 1998, he admitted to the Moon Theatre under the direction of Sergei Prokhanov.

In 2005, Helen took part in the reality show "Empire", which, according to her, has learned to light the stove, spinning wool, and milk the cow. She especially liked the role in the series "Kadetstvo", and the fact that it approved without trial for the role of Polina Sergeyevna.

== Personal life ==
Fated Sergey Mamontov, a businessman, and they had one daughter together, Anna-Maria Mamontova (4 February – October 2011), who died from meningococcal disease at the age of 8 months old. They broke up 11 days after their daughter's death. On 6 December 2017, she had her second daughter.

== Selected filmography ==
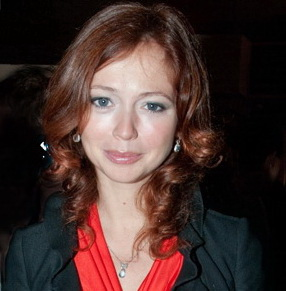
2011

Year	Title	Role	Notes
1995	Shelter comedians	Viktoriya	
1997	Christmas story	Bride	
1998	The judge in the trap	Hillary	TV movie
1998	Stop		Short
2001	Doctors	Nina	TV series
2001	Poisons or the World History of Poisoning (Яды, или Всемирная история отравлений)	actress in the theater	
2002	Lady for a day	Louisa	
2002	Spartacus and Kalashnikov	Oksana	
2003	Tartarin of Tarascon	Mary	TV movie
2004	Words and Music	Karina	
2005	Saga of ancient Bulgars. The Legend of St. Olga	Appak	
2005	The Last Guardian	Marina	TV series
2006	Return Vera	Vera Reshetnikova	TV movie
2006	Kadetstvo	Polina Sergeevna Olkhovskaya	TV series
2006	Parisians	Nastia Zabavnikova	TV series
2007	Putejtsy	passenger	TV series
2007	A successful exchange	Dasha	TV movie
2008	Jester and Venus	Margarita - movie star	TV movie
2008	Photographer	Dasha	TV series
2008	Hand happiness	Dusya	
2009	The Kremlin cadets	Polina Olkhovskaya	TV series
2009	The Princess and the beggar	Alena Krymova - Inga Sentsova	TV series
2009	Autumn colors	Leda Nezhina	TV series
2010	Seraphim beautiful	Ira Dolgova	
2010	When the lilac blooms	Tanya, my friend Lena	TV movie
2011	Running	Yulia	TV series
2012	Beach	Marina Kiryanova	
2013	Lednikov	Anna Razumovskaya	TV series
2013	Love in a million	Ira	TV series
2014	Where you	Nastya Fedorova	
2015	Juna		TV series
2015	Holiday disobedience		
