= Vanechka =

- Russian: Ванечка
- Directed by: Elena Nikolaeva
- Written by: Eduard Topol; Yuliya Topol
- Produced by: Andrey Bondarenko; Sergey Fiks; Mikheil Kalatozishvili
- Starring: Yelena Velikanova; Maksim Galkin; Andrey Panin; Evdokiya Germanova; Sergey Batalov
- Cinematography: Archil Akhvlediani
- Edited by: Alexander Hachko
- Music by: Yuri Poteyenko
- Production company: KinoRentService
- Release date: 2007
- Running time: 104 min.
- Country: Russia
- Language: Russian

Vanechka (Russian: Ванечка) is a 2007 Russian drama film directed by Elena Nikolaeva.

== Plot ==
Nadya came to Moscow to enter the theater institute. During the exams, she stayed with her friends. However, they die in a car accident, and Nadya was left alone with their little son Vanechka in her arms.

== Cast ==
- Yelena Velikanova as Nadya
- Maksim Galkin as Vanechka
- Andrey Panin as Gavrilov
- Evdokiya Germanova as orphanage headmistress
- Sergey Batalov as Major Nikulenko
- Alisa Grebenshchikova as Zina
- Valery Barinov as taxi driver
- Olga Drozdova as Olga Borisovna (cameo)
- Armen Dzhigarkhanyan as Professor Armen Borisovich (cameo)
- Sergey Yushkevich as Yan
- Ivan Rudakov as young priest
