= Yuri Poteyenko =

Russian film composer (born 1960)

- Born: Yuri Anatolievich Poteyenko; December 5, 1960 (age 65); Molodohvardiysk, Soviet Union (now Ukraine)
- Citizenship: Russian Federation
- Occupation: film composer

Yuri Anatolievich Poteyenko (Russian: Юрий Анатольевич Потеенко, born December 5, 1960) is a Russian film composer. Four times the winner of the Golden Eagle Award for the best film music (2010, 2013, 2016, 2018).

== Selected filmography ==
- Black Square (1992)
- Night Watch (2004)
- Popsa (2005)
- Day Watch (2006)
- The Russian Game (2007)
- The Irony of Fate 2 (2007)
- Vanechka (2007)
- The Inhabited Island (2009)
- The Inhabited Island. Skirmish (2009)
- The Salamander Key (2011)
- Spy (2012)
- White Tiger (2013)
- Metro (2013)
- Attack on Leningrad (2013)
- Devil's Pass (2013)
- Battalion (2015)
- The Age of Pioneers (2017)
- Anna Karenina: Vronsky's Story (2017)
- Saving Leningrad (2019)
- Goalkeeper of the Galaxy (2019)
- V2. Escape from Hell (2021)
- Secret Attraction (2023)
