= Rush Hour (2006 film) =

- Directed by: Oleg Fesenko
- Written by: Andrei Poyarkov
- Produced by: Sergey Danielyan, Ruben Dishdishyan, Aram Movsesyan, Yuri Moroz, Svetlana Slitiuk
- Starring: Konstantin Khabensky; Anna Kovalchuk; Andrey Merzlikin
- Cinematography: Anton Drozdov-Schaslivtsev
- Music by: Sergei Bondarenko
- Production companies: Studio Cherepakha; Central Partnership
- Release date: 2006
- Running time: 104 minutes
- Country: Russia
- Language: Russian

Rush Hour (Russian: Час пик, romanized: Chas pik) is a 2006 Russian drama film directed by Oleg Fesenko based on the novel of the same name by Jerzy Stawiński.

== Plot ==
Every morning successful advertising specialist Konstantin Arkhipov hurries to yet another meeting with the unknown. Kostya Arkhipov has lost control of his own life. At work, constant squabbles and intrigues, the relationship with his wife at a dead end, his beloved daughter has become self-absorbed, his mother has not spoken to him for a long time. In an effort to push back all the difficulties, he constantly travels and suffers from insomnia.

The crisis caused by the middle age coincides for the hero with an unpleasant discovery: after seeing the doctor's card in the course of a scheduled examination, the hero reads there that he has cancer and only a few months left to live. The prosperous life of an influential person comes to an end. Not because he made any decisions, but for the reason that his illness contributed to the fact that others have imposed these decisions on him. And when it turns out that the diagnosis was false - it becomes clear that the old life will not return.

Konstantin decides to do what he has not done, express everything he could not say, and, finally, live as the heart and conscience dictate.

== Cast ==
- Konstantin Khabensky — Konstantin Arkhipov
- Anna Kovalchuk — Evgeniya Arkhipova
- Andrey Merzlikin — Yura Smirnitskiy
- Raisa Ryazanova — Antonina Arkhipova
- Yekaterina Guseva — Kseniya Bazhenova
- Olga Shuvalova (II) — Anya Arkhipova
- Leonid Nevedomsky — Edouard Nikolaevich
- Natalya Kruglova — Marina
- Kristina Kuzmina — Violetta
- Andrei Zibrov — Vitaliy Obukhov
- Sergei Nikolaev (XI) — Sergei Rodnykh
- Maria Zhiganova
