= Hot Ice (TV series) =

- Жаркий лёд
- Developed by: Oleg Larin
- Starring: Yekaterina Guseva; Alexei Tikhonov; Boris Nevzorov
- Composers: Sergei Paramonov; Valery Didyulya
- Country of origin: Russia; Ukraine
- No. of seasons: 1
- No. of episodes: 100

Production
- Executive producer: Ilia Averbukh
- Production locations: Moscow, Russia; St. Petersburg, Russia
- Running time: 52 minutes

Original release
- Network: Channel One Russia
- Release: 3 January – 30 June 2009

Hot Ice (Russian: Жаркий лёд, romanized: Zharkiy lyod) is a 2009 television series produced by Star Media which aired on Channel One

In the series both professional actors and iceskaters took part.

== Plot ==
The film begins with the Russian Figure Skating Championships, where there is a tough fight for a ticket to the European Championship. The competition is not over yet, but the leaders have already decided: the first Nikolay Rokotov and Alexandra Belkevich, followed by Vera Loginova and Sergey Bratsev. For the third place fighting pair Zorina — Davydenko and Trofimova — Molodtsov. Couple Trofimova — Molodtsov, seeing that the odds are not high, take risks. In defiance of coach Alexander Trofimov, who is also the father of Natalia Trofimova, they include in its program of complex support.

During his speech, Viktor Molodtsov notices in the stands his former sweetheart, figure skater Berkovskaya, which a few years ago went to America. Molodtsov wrong and Natalya drops on the ice. As a result of severe trauma Natalia can not pursue a career skater. But she can not imagine her life without ice, and now she has to prove to himself and others, that her career is not finished in the sport.

== Cast ==
- Yekaterina Guseva as Natalia Trofimova
- Alexei Tikhonov as Nikolay Rokotov
- Pavel Trubiner as Sergey Bratsev
- Maria Anikanova as Anna Berkovskaya
- Roman Kostomarov as Viktor Molodtsov
- Anna Bolshova as Sasha Belkevich
- Alexei Yagudin as Roma Kozyrev
- Alexander Abt as Maxim Voronin
- Boris Nevzorov as coach Trofimov
- Irina Slutskaya as coach Ivanova
- Lyudmila Artemieva as Violetta Konstantinovna
- Agniya Kuznetsova as Asya Samsonova
- Vyacheslav Grishechkin as Vitaly Borisovich Smylkin, director of the Ice Palace

== Shooting group ==
- Directors: Oleg Larin, Vladimir Filimonov, Anario Mamedov, Mikhail Kabanov
- Writers: Vladimir Dyachenko, Ametkhan Magomedov, Svetlana Korolyova, Igor Mityushin, Konstantin Chepurin, Andrey Galanov
- Сinematographer: Anna Kuranova
- Composer: Sergey Paramonov
- Artist: Konstantin Vinokurov
- Producers: Vitaly Bordachyov, Vladislav Ryashin, Ilya Averbukh
