= Spartacus and Kalashnikov =

- Russian: Спартак и Калашников
- Directed by: Andrey Proshkin
- Written by: Alla Krinitsyna
- Produced by: Aleksandr Kotelevsky; Fyodor Popov
- Starring: Yaroslav Roshchin; Ignat Akrachkov; Andrey Panin; Irina Rozanova; Yuri Stepanov; Darya Ekamasova
- Cinematography: Lomer Akhvlediani
- Music by: Vladimir Chekasin
- Production companies: Stella; Mosfilm
- Release date: 11 April 2002
- Running time: 95 min.
- Country: Russia
- Language: Russian
- Box office: $ 110 000

Spartacus and Kalashnikov (Russian: Спартак и Калашников, romanized: Spartak i Kalashnikov) is a 2002 Russian children's drama film directed by Andrey Proshkin.

Spartacus and Kalashnikov was awarded the Golden Eagle for best directorial debut in a feature film.

== Plot ==
The story of the incredible adventures of a 13-year-old orphanage student, Shurka Kalashnikov, and a German shepherd named Spartacus. Friends wander, and their friendship is repeatedly tested for devotion and loyalty.

Fate brings them either to the new Russians, or to street children, or to the military unit of service dog breeding. In the end, Spartacus helps neutralize the terrorists, and the friends become heroes.

== Cast ==
- Yaroslav Roshchin as Shurka Kalashnikov
- Ignat Akrachkov as corporal Purga
- Irina Rozanova as Snezhana
- Yuri Stepanov as Falkov
- Darya Ekamasova as Vera Dudkina
- Vladimir Menshov as colonel Egorov
- Andrey Panin as Marat Ivanovich
- Irina Pegova as veterinary doctor
- Grigori Khristoforov as Chunya
- Yelena Zakharova as Oksana
- Grigory Siyatvinda as Tom
- Pavel Astakhov as cameo
- Iago von Artemiszwinger as Spartacus
