= Snake Spring (film) =

- Directed by: Nikolai Lebedev
- Written by: Nikolai Lebedev
- Produced by: Valery Todorovsky; Sergei Livnev; Alexander Bokovikov; Yevgeny Ulyushkin
- Starring: Sergei Makhovikov; Yekaterina Guseva; Olga Ostroumova; Yevgeny Mironov
- Cinematography: Sergei Astakhov
- Edited by: Anna Strelnikova
- Music by: Mikhail Smirnov
- Production company: Gorky Film Studio
- Release date: 1997
- Running time: 87 minutes
- Country: Russia
- Language: Russian
- Budget: 269 000 $

Snake Spring (Russian: Змеиный источник, romanized: Zmeiny istochnik) is a 1997 Russian mystery thriller film, and the directorial debut of Nikolai Lebedev. It is one of the first psychological thrillers of Russian cinema after the Soviet Union.

== Plot ==
Yevgeny Mironov as Andron

Yekaterina Guseva as Dina

The film is set in the end of the 1990s. Dina Sergeeva (Yekaterina Guseva), a young student of a pedagogical university's biological faculty, comes for an internship to a correctional school in a provincial town for the sake of her beau Alexei (Sergei Makhovikov), doctor of the local school's laboratory. During their nocturnal meeting in the city park near the beach, it turns out that the young man has already married Zinochka (Ekaterina Vulichenko) – the underage daughter of schoolteacher Mariana Pavlovna. Additionally, she is pregnant with Alexei's child. This news upsets the woman very much, and out of grief she decides to submerge herself in the city's reservoir.

During her bath she discovers a young girl's mutilated corpse whose death was caused by strangulation. Upon Dina's scream the whole district shows up and she is immediately detained by the police, thus becoming the main suspect. Pyotr Matyukhin (Mikhail Filippov), investigator of the local department of internal affairs, begins to pressure the girl into confessing to the murder. All the evidence points to Dina; there are even photos where Dina is pictured next to the deceased in a beach restaurant near the local sight – Snake Spring. But these photographic materials do not correspond to reality.

Professional photographer Andrei (Dmitry Maryanov) who supposedly made these pictures claims that he does not remember anything of the sort. Thanks to the intervention of school director Tamara Georgievna (Olga Ostroumova), Dina returns to work and to everyday life. But the investigator does not remove her from the list of suspects and makes her sign a written pledge not to leave.

Tamara Georgievna, having great authority in the city, tries in every possible way to change the course of the investigation in this case. She is actively assisted by the school secretary Andron Balashov (Yevgeny Mironov), a former prodigious pupil of the same school and pride of the city.

At the same time serial killings of young girls occur in the town. Local residents are sure that Dina is involved in these brutal murders. They demand that she be punished severely and begin to hunt for her. Circumstances develop in such a way that someone specially substitutes the young teacher. School teacher Mariana Pavlovna (Elena Anisimova), from whom Dina has been renting her room since she arrived, in the light of recent events is ready to put her out on the street. Dina herself, along with Zinochka and photographer Andrei, who have become her best friends, begin to conduct their own investigation. And as a result many unexpected details are revealed. For example, the drunkard joker Alex – a pest of Dina and Zinochka, is Tamara Georgievna's longtime lover.

== Cast ==
- Sergei Makhovikov as Alexei Grigoryevich, the school doctor
- Yekaterina Guseva as Dina Sergeevna
- Olga Ostroumova as Tamara Georgievna, director of the school
- Yevgeny Mironov as Andron Anatolyevich Balashov, school secretary
- Dmitry Maryanov as Andrei, photographer
- Lev Borisov as Semyon Semyonovich
- Mikhail Filippov as Matyuhin, investigator
- Yekaterina Vulichenko as Zina, Alexei's wife
- Elena Anisimova as Mariana Pavlovna, Zinochka's mother

== Production ==
The film was shot in the urban settlements of Proletarsky (Moscow region) and Sharapova Okhota of the Serpukhovsky District of the Moscow region from June 1 to June 27, 1997 – the filming took 26 days, which at the time was one of the quickest shoots in the history of Russian cinematography.

Yevgeny Mironov was initially hired to play the photographer Andrei, but later he himself chose to play school secretary Andron.
