= Poisons or the World History of Poisoning =

2001 film by Karen Shakhnazarov

- Directed by: Karen Shakhnazarov
- Written by: Karen Shakhnazarov; Alexander Borodyansky
- Produced by: Karen Shakhnazarov
- Starring: Ignat Akrachkov; Oleg Basilashvili
- Cinematography: Vladimir Klimov
- Music by: Anatoli Kroll
- Production company: Mosfilm
- Release date: 2001
- Running time: 106 minutes
- Country: Russia
- Language: Russian

Poisons or the World History of Poisoning (Russian: Яды, или Всемирная история отравлений, romanized: Yady, ili vsemirnaya istoriya otravleniy) is a 2001 Russian fantastical absurdist comedy directed by Karen Shakhnazarov.

== Plot ==
Young family of Volkov's, Oleg and Katya, move to an apartment they bought and get acquainted with their neighbor, locksmith Arnold Sharapov. Right during a friendly dinner Katya cheats on her husband. Frustrated Oleg decides to drown his sorrows in alcohol, but at the bar accidentally meets Ivan Petrovich Prokhorov, pensioner, whose wife in his time was also unfaithful. In a conversation with the nice old man, Oleg learns that Prokhorov punished his wife by slipping poison into her yogurt. And now Ivan strongly persuades Oleg to also kill his unfaithful wife, using a small collection of poisons which Prokhorov constantly carries with him.

After some hesitation Oleg decides to do the terrible thing, but random interference from his mother-in-law Eugenia Ivanovna Kholodkova saves the wife of the hapless poisoner. As a result of a family quarrel, Oleg leaves the house and is a guest of Zoya, wife of Arnold, who in turn drove her traitor-husband out of the house. Oleg and Zoya fall in love with each other and decide to live together.

But the former spouses of the loving couple, consumed with anger and envy decide to destroy them. On the advice of the insidious mother-in-law Evgenia Ivanovna, Arnold and Katya want to invite Oleg and Zoya to dinner together and poison them by feeding them contaminated burgers. Learning this, Oleg first seeks the advice of experienced poisoner Prokhorov, who offers a number of retaliatory steps brilliant in their deviousness. But in the end Oleg decides to let go peacefully, both couples divorce, Oleg and Zoya begin together an existence full of love and mutual interests...

Throughout the action, under the influence of Prokhorov's stories about famous poisoners Oleg often "daydreams", imagining crimes of these villains. Central figure in Oleg's visions becomes Pope Alexander VI Borgia, the famous medieval poisoner and a victim of his own treachery...

== Cast ==
- Ignat Akrachkov as Oleg Volkov, actor
- Oleg Basilashvili as Ivan Petrovich Prokhorov, pensioner / Pope Alexander VI
- Zhanna Dudanova as Katya, Oleg's wife
- Aleksandr Bashirov as Arnold Sharapov, locksmith
- Olga Tumaykina as Zoya Filimonova, sportswoman, Arnold's wife
- Lyudmila Kasatkina as Eugenia Ivanovna Kholodkova, Oleg's mother-in-law
- Andrei Panin as Cesare Borgia
- Nikolay Afanasyev as Cardinal di Carnet
- Yuriy Osherov as Socrates
- Aleksandr Andreevich as Artaxerxes II of Persia
- Elena Fomina as Parysatis
- Veronika Nikolaeva as Stateira, Artaxerxes's wife
- Marina Kazankova as Lucrezia Borgia
- Ekaterina Klimova as Jeanne d'Albret
- Elena Obukhova as Madame de Brinvilliers
- Ivan Lakshin as Nero
- Fedor Shelenkov as Caligula
- Timur Matsiev as Khan Meñli I Giray
- Dmitri Dyuzhev as Dr. Edme Costa
- Yelena Zakharova as actress in the theater

== Awards ==
The film was awarded the Grand Prix at the Kinotavr film festival in Sochi. At the Karlovy Vary International Film Festival the picture was nominated for the Crystal Globe and was screened at the 51st Berlin International Film Festival.
