= Brigada =

2002 Russian crime television miniseries

- title screen
- Directed by: Aleksey Sidorov
- Written by: Igor Poroblyov; Aleksey Sidorov
- Produced by: Valery Todorovsky; Anatoly Sivushov
- Starring: Sergei Bezrukov; Dmitri Dyuzhev; Vladimir Vdovichenkov; Pavel Maykov; Yekaterina Guseva
- Distributed by: Beta Film GmbH
- Release date: 2002
- Running time: 750 min.
- Country: Russia
- Language: Russian

Brigada (Russian: Бригада), also known as Law of the Lawless, is a Russian 15-episode crime television miniseries that debuted in 2002. It became very popular in Russia and ex-Soviet countries as well as Eastern Europe, but received criticism for positive portrayal of criminals and aestheticization of violence. The miniseries follows the story of four best friends from 1989 to 2000, and follows their rise in the world of crime from a local gang of petty thugs to a true mafia in the wild nineties, mainly concentrating on the leader of the group, Sasha Belov, played by Sergei Bezrukov. The fifteen-part miniseries was written by Igor Porublyov and Aleksey Sidorov and directed by Aleksey Sidorov.

== Plot ==
The series proceeds in chronological order, apart from the scene at the beginning of the first episode before the opening credits, which was taken from Winter 1997.

=== Summer 1989 ===
The film begins in 1989 when Sergeant Alexander (Sasha) Belov, (nicknamed Bely, or white) has finished his national service in the Soviet Border Troops, and returns to his home in Moscow. He is greeted there by his three childhood friends, Kosmos Kholmogorov (or Kosmos (Kos)/Space), Viktor Pchyolkin (Pchyola/Bee), and Valery Filatov (Fil/Phil). His return, however, shows that perestroika has deeply transformed the Soviet Union life and both Kosmos and Pchyola have turned to criminal racket on Moscow's markets. They try to lure Sasha to join them, but Belov abruptly refuses and instead has ambitions to attain higher education in vulcanology.

Belov also learns that his former girlfriend, Yelena Yeliseyeva (Lena, Lenka) has become a prostitute. Enraged, Sasha ventures to the disco, and finds her there, but an attempted conversation is interrupted by Yelena's pimp, Mukha (Fly). Having earlier prepared for a likely fight, Belov strikes Mukha in the face with a brass knuckle resulting in fracture. Before Mukha's fellow gangsters have time to beat up Sasha, Kosmos, Fil and Pchyola arrive and rescue their friend.

What Bely did not know was that Mukha has strong ties in the Militsiya — his cousin Lieutenant Vladimir Kaverin (Volodya). After Mukha's recovery, Kaverin agrees to cover the revenge against Belov, which is likely to result in death. Belov instead comes to the gang's gathering and challenges Mukha to a 1-on-1 fight, which the latter loses. The fight also ends Belov's relationship with Lenka.

Unlike Pchyola and Kosmos, Fil instead is keen on pursuing a sporting career in boxing. His ambitions are lost when a doctor diagnoses him with early symptoms of Parkinson's disease and does not allow him to continue boxing, yet at the same time offers him to compete in an underground Mixed martial arts club. Fil makes his fighting début there and is supported by his three friends, but the audience includes Mukha, who decides to take his chance to avenge Belov by stabbing him, when a brawl breaks out among the supporters. The brawl is broken up by a man, who fires several shots in the air, causing the crowd to run off.

The next morning Mukha's body is found in the hangar where the fight took place and Kaverin bribes the investigator to consider Belov the prime suspect. Soon, the militsiya arrive at his apartment with a search warrant and plant a pistol in his clothes. Kosmos, who accidentally passes by, is asked to witness the discovery of the pistol. When requested to sign papers as a witness, Kosmos spots Sasha on the street approaching his apartment. Kosmos leaves hastily and throws him in a car and explains what has happened. Afterwards Kosmos hides Sasha in a dacha (vacation house) outside Moscow, and his friends make separate statements to the investigator. Simultaneously, Sasha's mother tries to recruit a lawyer and also seeks help from Kosmos's father, Yuri Rostislavovich, who is a member of the Soviet Academy of Sciences and thus has numerous contacts among the Soviet elite.

At the dacha, Sasha notices a beautiful neighbour, Olga Surikova, with whom he immediately falls in love. He follows her to her violin recital in Moscow and begins a courtship. The date ends abruptly when Olga, waiting for Sasha to return from repairing a broken heel on her shoe, notices a wanted poster on the train platform with his face and name.

Sasha's friends decide to lift his spirits, and with Fil's sport contacts "recruit" a group of four female swimmers, whom they drive to the Dacha for a party that ends with couples pairing off for sex. The music volume is so high that Olga's grandmother calls the local militsiya sheriff. Having arrived too late to break up the party, he, however, discerns Belov's face, and upon returning to his station recognizes him on the wanted poster and immediately calls the OMON (armed police squad) for an arrest. They arrive just after Fil and Kosmos drive off for more alcohol, and Pchyola and Sasha barely escape the gunfire-rattled dacha into the woods, where Sasha takes a bullet.

Realising that he is out of money, Kosmos arrives home and drunkenly confronts his father and Sasha's mother, promising that everything is all right with Sasha. Returning to the country, they find the sheriff taken hostage by Pchyola and Sasha and, warning him not to report the incident, drive off without killing him. In the meantime, Kosmos' father spends a whole night on the phone and finally announces that he has cleared Sasha's name. Unfortunately, it might be a year before he can return to Moscow. The 1989 story ends on top of Sparrow Hills as dawn breaks, with the four friends overlooking the panorama of Moscow. The blood-soaked Sasha swears to his friends that he will always remain loyal to them and to the Brigada.

=== Spring 1991 ===
The film picks up in 1991 and the viewer learns that Sasha, after one and a half years of hiding in the Urals, decided that a criminal life would be natural after what has happened. Fil now works as a stuntman and the Brigada controls several auto-services and markets. Because their income is insignificant and their prominence is low, Pchyola suggests to Sasha that they make their first big move by racketing the chairmen (and Pchyola's former neighbour) of the large trading company Kurs-Invest. The company owner, Artur, despite the obvious fear stricken into him by Belov's somewhat-humorous methods, abruptly refuses to accept his "offer", and leaves Belov's lawyer badly injured.

In revenge, Belov hijacks Artur's large shipping of several train cars full of aluminium from Tajikistan. After an unsuccessful attempt by Artur's own semi-criminal bodyguards to deal with Belov, the profile of the dispute catches the KGB's attention and agent Igor Vvedenskiy announces Belov's talent to his superiors and seeks permission to let the group develop further, under their control. At the same time, Artur contacts the militsiya and his case is taken up by, the now Captain, Kaverin who sees this as a perfect chance to settle the 1989 incident with Belov.

In the meantime, Sasha marries Olga and, after a lavish reception, their first wedding night is to follow in their new apartment in the Kotelnicheskaya Embankment Building (a wedding gift by Pchyola, Fil and Kosmos). However, this almost ends in disaster when the hem of Olga's wedding gown gets tangled in a wire attached to the pin of a hand grenade, neatly set up right across the front door of their apartment. Sasha manages to grab the armed grenade and throw it into the stairwell after a neighbour's dog rushed to rip the wire and release the pin.

Afterwards, in Kosmos's father's apartment, Olga confesses to Sasha despite her knowing who he is and what he does, she still loves him. Knowing that such action could have been carried out only by a mole, Sasha stages his imminent departure to Yalta, which causes the mole to reveal himself. Afterwards he is driven out into the woods and killed. Belov openly states to his Brigada that anyone who tries something like that will share his fate.

Kaverin shows Artur the picture of the dead mole, and much to irritation of Artur for the failed attempt to remove Belov, Kaverin tries to convince him that this is a perfect evidence to legally crush the Brigada. Artur refuses, but at that instant the Brigada burst into the office. Artur and Kaverin just manage to hide in the toilet, and Kosmos and Bee nearly assault Artur's secretary Lyuda. After they leave, Kaverin takes drunk Artur's signature to write a statement by himself. Yet at this point Vvedensky's KGB move in, and Kaverin is promptly discharged from service.

Simultaneously, the original Aluminium producer from Tajikistan calls for the Tajik mafia to move in against Belov for hijacking their deal, as Artur paid only half the fee. In an imminent gang duel Bely recognises the leader as his old army friend Farkhad Dzhurayev (Farik). The two instead choose to turn to the drug trade, where Belov's Aluminium trains would be used to smuggle heroin from Tajikistan. To celebrate the deal, both Belov's Brigada and Farik's godfathers go to a lavish restaurant, where they witness Olga performing. Vvedensky makes contact with Belov and under threat of prison announces that narcotics are to be only transited via Russia. In return for Belov's agreement, Artur is forced to give up his position and emigrate, and Belov fully takes over Kurs-Invest including its office and even Artur's secretary, Lyuda.

Olga, after her graduation from the Philharmonia does not begin her music career, but instead turns to her former course-mate Vitalik, and joins his band. Vitalik, not hiding his attraction to Olga, tries to blackmail her into leaving her husband, who openly disapproves of both Vilalik and her being part of the band, which he further makes visible by having the whole party leave the restaurant. Eventually Sasha witnesses how Vitalik verbally offends Olga and makes him suffer in a short fight, after which Olga happily walks off with Sasha. The 1991 part of the film finishes when Olga and Sasha pause their love-making when they become aware that the television is broadcasting the same Swan Lake on all channels, which a Russian viewer will know is the beginning of the 1991 August Coup which brought the end of the Soviet Union.

=== Autumn 1993 ===
The 1993 story picks with Sasha returning from the United States, just as Olga is about to give birth to their son, Ivan. He arrives during the Constitutional coup. Simultaneously, Farik also arrives in Moscow, who is sent by his family elders to negotiate a deal to sell narcotics in Moscow, rather than following Belov's less profitable suggestion of transporting them to the West. As the two parties reach Sasha's office, the Russian OMON raid the premises, and all the Brigada are arrested and taken to the Butyrka isolator.

The large cell is filled with people swept up in raids, including Kaverin and two colleagues. Although the two parties do not approach each other, they describe what they know of their friends, and that Kaverin, after leaving the MVD, now works for a private security firm with criminal activities, headed by Bek.

Vvedenskiy, realising what has become of Belov, arranges for his release. As soon as Sasha walks out he learns that Olga has given birth. As the Brigada drive off to the hospital they see army trucks removing the dead from the White House.

Seeing his newborn son, the Brigada come back to the office, where Farik tells the problems he has to Beliy. Kosmos and Pchyola agree that selling drugs in Moscow would bring more revenue, but Sasha refuses. The discussion ends, and Farik walks out saying that he felt betrayed. Kosmos convinces Beliy to change his mind, but stating that he will not play any direct role in the deal.

What they do not know, is that the whole conversation is recorded by Kaverin via remote surveillance equipment. Immediately Kaverin forwards the tapes to Bek, who agrees to hijack the deal. Sasha fearing that the clients might trap Farik, offers Fil to come along to oversee the exchange. Farik, however, refuses, and Sasha's worst fear comes true. The deal is carried out with Farik handing over the narcotics on the Ferris Wheel of the VDNKh and his two Tajik friends receiving the money outside Moscow. After the exchange, both Tajik parties are murdered.

Sasha learns what has happened and personally takes the bodies to Farik's elders in Tajikistan. Belov explains, to his father that they have every right to consider him responsible, but he is here alone, and that their partnership is more important. After showing Farik's father the photo of the newborn Ivan, the former allows him to return to Moscow and find those responsible.

Kaverin, now sceptical of Bek approaches the Brigada. After playing them the tapes, he convinces them that he was gathering intelligence for Bek, and knew he would hijack the exchange. The action on New Year's Eve alternates between Sasha and Olga at a performance of Tchaikovsky's Waltz from Swan Lake and various locations in Moscow where Bek himself and his group are killed in retaliation for Farik's death. Belov, bored at the concert, receives news of the successful operation amid the final applause. This causes him stand up with the audience and applaud a Bravo.

The 1993 part of the film ends with Vvedenskiy reporting to the KGB on Kaverin. Seeing how the subject has successfully played out a double agent between Bek and Belov and that his personal score with the latter, Vvedenskiy proposes to support Kaverin as a counterbalance Belov's growing brigade.

=== Autumn 1994 ===
As Belov's group gains more and more prominence, bigger games become played. Their contacts go beyond narcotics, and Kaverin sets Kosmos up with Luka, a renowned Thief in law. Luka offers to use Belov's drug channels to transfer arms to Chechnya for Kosmos. Belov, however, is not interested in the Arms Trade, and instead wants to legalise his activities, for which he befriends a Russian politician, Viktor Petrovich and passes on a set of papers for a "restoration fund" which grants him tax-free trade of alcohol and tobacco.

However, the KGB (now FSK) want the arms deal to progress, and have Luka's men attack Sasha when he is visiting with Olga and Ivan to his mother's flat. Belov's bodyguard Max is able to kill two and pursues the remaining assassin away. Max hurries Olga and Ivan to a safe-house outside Moscow, while Belov and Fil hide in an undisclosed flat in Moscow.

The shoot-out gains wide coverage on television, which Vvedenskiy watches from home. He instructs Kaverin to bring Kosmos to Luka, who tells Kosmos that in case of Belov's refusal, Luka will remove Belov altogether and Kosmos will take over. Despite this offer, Kosmos breaks the situation to Belov. Olga discovers that Ivan has a throat infection that needs an urgent operation. Driving to a local hospital, their escort gets caught at a GAI checkpoint and is apprehended. During Ivan's operation, Luka's men surround the small provincial hospital, with only Max to defend it.

While Fil unsuccessfully tries to gain aid from Viktor Petrovich, Luka phones Belov and states his ultimatum. Belov throws the phone down, and Luka tells Kaverin to finish him off. Kaverin hires a professional sniper and a gang duel is called on the Tushino airfield with the sniper on top of a building several kilometres away. However, Luka is killed instead of Sasha, and Pchyola and Fil finish off his bodyguards. Luka's men leave the hospital and Ivan's operation is completed.

Afterwards, Beliy meets with Vvedensky and Kaverin. Vvedenskiy tells him that Kaverin is taking over Luka's activities and Beliy must sell weapons to Chechnya if he does not want a repeat of what has happened. The 1994 story ends when Belov visits his mother's flat. Witnessing the earlier assassination attempt, she collapsed with a heart attack, and died. Belov talks to her spirit, asking her to forgive him.

=== Spring 1995 ===
The First Chechen War has broken out, and there are daily radio reports of Russian casualties from guerilla attacks. Kosmos feels very personal about this, as it was initially his idea, but now the weapons they are selling are being used against the Russians. Pchyola takes over the financial side of the distribution. This causes an open conflict between them, causing Sasha to intervene. Having already been an addict of cocaine, Kosmos overdoses, and is injured in a car accident. Sasha visits him at his father's house, and Kosmos confesses that back in 1989, upon seeing Mukha creep up behind Bely with a knife, it was he who shot him. Sasha forgives him and decides to end the Chechen problem.

Belov continues his attempts in legalising the Brigada's activities and secures a deal with Viktor Petrovich for a set of alcohol and tobacco licenses. Breaking the news to Fil, they go to a casino to celebrate, where Sasha becomes very drunk, and they bump into famous film producer Gordon and his wife, actress Anyuta, whom Fil knows from his work as a stuntman.

Kaverin finalises a new shipment of arms to Chechnya and after agreeing on the route, goes to the same casino, where he crosses paths with Belov. They begin to argue on their mutual dislike of each other, and Kaverin confesses it was his influence that the search of his house in 1989 included a false extraction of a pistol. Bely breaks a bottle of champagne on Volodya's head. Upon leaving the casino, Bely sees Anyuta's look and comes back to her place beginning an affair. The next morning he discovers that Gordon is homosexual and their marriage is merely a convenience.

Kaverin heads off to Chechnya, and meets the insurgent militants. The delivery of arms is intercepted by Army spetsnaz commandos, who kill the militants and destroy the trucks. Back in Moscow the frantic Pchyola, waiting for the call to confirm the deal, is told that everything is destroyed. Sasha reaffirms him that despite the US$11 million they lost, it will be good for them nonetheless. Viktor Petrovich thanks Sasha for the information he has given him and reassures him that he has nothing to fear from the Vvedensky's side. Belov meets Vvedensky in front of his own home, and realizing that Vvedensky is shocked that Belov knows where he lives, Sasha tells him that they both have children and that all he wants is for them to co-exist. Vvedensky acknowledges that even he can be manipulated by Bely, and agrees with him that stopping the arms flow was the right thing to do.

The 1995 part of the film ends with a blood soaked Kaverin, who despite taking two sniper bullets, is limping next a burnt out village. A Russian Army BTR patrol pulls up and the soldiers rescue him.

=== Winter 1997 ===
After the previous events, the Brigada begins to cool down. Fil has a very successful part as a stuntman in a new production by Gordon about Highlander. Sasha maintains the affair with Gordon's wife, Anyuta, who has the main role in the film. After a particularly good stunt Fila borrows a camcorder from Anyuta to show Ivan, who returns with Olga from America. He also takes head of mannequin with him. Fil drives Olga and Ivan home and then catches the rest of the Brigada in a night club. There Pchyola negotiates a new money laundering deal with the Caucasus mafia. Bely refuses to accept it, out of principle's of continuing the legal profile of the business. Pchyola, much to the dismay of Kosmos, decides to follow it through alone and travels to airport not with Brigada but with Caucasians.

Pchyola departs for the airport to catch his flight to Germany. As Fil drives Kosmos and Sasha back to their office, all three notice how their wristwatch arms accelerate and the radio begins to glitch. In a split second decision Sasha yells for everyone to jump out, and with Kosmos they roll out onto the snow-covered street. Fil however hesitates, and jumps only seconds before the large Mercedes explodes. This is the scene that was shown before the opening credits of the first episode.

Unconscious, he is rushed off to the hospital where he spends several hours under surgery with serious head injuries. Kosmos convinces Sasha that Pchyola is the only one who could have carried this out, as after their death he'll have everything and he didn't sit into their car. They send their head of security, Shmit, and his men (all former thugs) to find him. Pchyola himself, as soon as he learns of the attack, just as he arrives to the airport, catches the first taxi back to Moscow.

Night falls, and Fil is still under surgery, Olga meanwhile is learning to drive with Maks (now her and Ivan's personal bodyguard), on the Kutuzovsky Prospekt, where Pchyola catches up with her. He tells her on the phone not to tell Max about him and asks her to stop at the pharmacy and come in alone. There he tells her that the camcorder which Fil borrowed remained turned on, and that right now it is at Anyuta's house (Fil returned it to her after realizing that it was Gordon's camera). Max upon seeing Pchyola immediately calls Shmit, who arrives and brings him to the hospital.

Olga meanwhile comes to Anyuta's home and confronts her, forcing to abandon the affair with Sasha, and to return the camera. At the hospital Pchyola is met with Bely and Kosmos holding pistols, they are interrupted by a nurse asking for anyone with Type B negative blood for Fil. Sasha points to Pchyola who makes a transfusion to the still unconscious Fila, after the operation was finally completed.

Kosmos then tells Bely that he will not have the courage to kill Pchyola, to which Sasha replies that neither will he. Kos advises Sasha to have Shmit do it. To calm his nerves, Sasha asks Kosmos for cocaine, stating that, he spent many years selling it but never tried it, though after a second attempt he feels nothing. At this moment Olga and Maks burst in with the camcorder. Sasha shouts at Olga, but Maks intervenes and plays the tape, which shows how Gordon plants the bomb inside the head of mannequin that Fil brought with him. Kosmos remembers that Gordon has borrowed half a million from Fil, but lacked the means to pay it off. Realizing what has happened, Kosmos pleads to Pchyola for his mistake. The 1997 part of the film ends when Olga walks in on the drunken Kosmos, Sasha and Pchyola and tells them that Fil is in a coma.

=== Winter 1998 ===
A year has passed and Fil is still in a coma. The doctors try to persuade his wife, Tamara to turn off his feeding tube, as there is little chance of recovery. Learning of this, Belov, though agreeing to transferring him to a private clinic, decides to avenge his friend. Gordon makes a successful and popular premiere of his new picture, and to celebrate he meets his homosexual date where they drive off to a gay club. Before they leave the car, the young lad passes his regards from Sasha Bely and strangles Gordon to death.

The murder of a famous film producer generates a massive media outrage about the mafia, and Olga takes Ivan and leaves Sasha. Belov comes to the same dacha where her grandmother still lives and almost forcefully assaults Olga. The militsiya arrive, where Sasha recognises the same militsiya sheriff from 1989. He turns himself in and back at the station they drink and dance, telling their life stories. The militsiya officer then demonstrates the old wanted poster of Belov, and sets out making him some photocopies. As he awaits, Belov's eyes grow in shock when he sees an election poster with Kaverin's face. Kaverin has survived Chechnya, and is running for the State Duma in the upcoming majoritarian election.

Shmit, Pchyola and Kosmos pay Gordon's assassin, but after he leaves the cafe, a SOBR unit arrests them, drives into the woods, where the three are forced to dig a grave for themselves under gunpoint. The SOBR gunmen open fire at the empty trees right above their heads, and walk off, leaving the three to find a way out. When the three dirty men arrive back at the office, Belov enquires into the event. Viktor Petrovich tells him that it was carried out by a militsiya commander, who after Gordon's death sends a warning that there were still law and order who could crush Bely and his Brigada should this happen again. Bely confronts the Commander, telling he did what was necessary for his friend. He gets a phone call from the hospital that there has been further complications with Fil. Before leaving the Commander, he takes a Russian Orthodox cross that the SOBR took from his friends.

The 1998 part ends when Sasha visits Fil and finds him surrounded by doctors. He kneels over Fil, and seeing that his eyes are open whispers: "brother". A tear flows out of Fil's eyes. After that Belov makes up his mind to run against Kaverin.

=== Winter 1999 ===
Its December 1999, and the elections are scheduled for early spring 2000, and Kaverin and Belov try to outdo each other. Vvedensky decides to act once again, and pushes the two to closer confrontation. Kaverin plays on discrediting his opponent, and to smear Belov's image, a provocative poster "Brotherhood is fighting to the Power" with Belov holding a pistol is issued, and then the typography which printed them is set on fire. One day Belov and his family arrive home to their television set that is playing police surveillance reels from the early 1990s showing how the Brigada are involved in racket, after which Kaverin rings to Belov. A bug is found in Belov's office, but most of all, at a press conference Kaverin demonstrates Artur to the public, who tells of how Belov's criminal gang forced him out of Russia and took over his business in 1991. Kaverin's public biography is based on a real officer who died in Chechnya and was given him by Vvedensky. Vvedensky warns Volodya that if the public finds out what he did there, this would be used against him.

Bely's campaign focuses more on the social problems. He has his men deliver presents to the poor, and sponsors construction of Eastern Orthodox Churches to win support. He tries to re-unite with Olga, and after a dinner together, breaks with her into the same dacha where he hid in 1989. There he tells her of his thoughts, before the discussion turns to love-making.

As the elections near, the two candidates engage in a television debate, both ask piercing questions into their cloudy past. Kaverin decides to play a trump card, a cassette with more early 1990s recordings. However instead a scene from The Godfather is played, much to the amusement of the viewers. Belov then takes the initiative and states that the reel that was to be played was one of thousands there could be and admits to his past. He then states that this mess, in which he was forced to take the actions he did, was caused at the very top in the government and he was just a pawn that was swept into the new world. Furthermore, he appeals that what is important is that, at present, everybody wants to live in a better country, where the necessary actions of the past would remain there.

Soon the elections come, and despite Kaverin's early lead, Belov clips a narrow margin at the last moment and wins the vote. A celebration follows at Belov's office, Kosmos proposes to Lyuda, Artur's original secretary who has worked with them since 1991. Then a phone call follows that Sasha and Olga are on their way. Pchyola and Kosmos come out into the snow-covered courtyard to greet them, and see Sasha's red armoured SUV driven alone by Maks, who climbs out and stabs the two.

Bely who arrives later, is shocked at what happened. At dawn Belov also learns that Fil, who was still recovering in the hospital and his wife Tamara were also killed in the clinic. On the wall a sign "GORGE IT BEAST" (in Russian "ЖРИ ТВАРЬ") is written with blood. Maks is nowhere to be found. Meeting up with Vvedensky Sasha learns that Maksim Karelskiy, despite working for eight years for Belov, and several times rescuing both him, his family and Pchyola from Bely himself, was nonetheless a mole for Kaverin since 1991. Originally he crossed paths with the Chechen mafia and Kaverin paid his ransom, after which he used him to infiltrate the Brigada.

Vvedensky along with Viktor Petrovich, the whole underground criminal world, and even Yuri Rostislavovich (Kosmos's father), all ask that Belov should not seek revenge. Sasha says that he can't accept that, and first rattles Kaverin's apartment with an PKM as a message he will avenge. In the final stunt, he contacts his old friend who the viewer saw throughout the film, karate trainer and stuntman Alexander Inshakov. Originally they meet up back in 1989 when Sasha bought a mastiff, then again in 1991 they offered him to train his men, and he refused, Inshakov was Fil's close friend during their stunt work for Gordon, and shortly before Gordon's death asked him to have all of the film reels to make a tribute to stuntman Filatov.

Sasha then visits the morgue where already the four coffins are prepared for the funeral, and symbolically adds three pistols into the hands of his friends. The next day, Kosmos's original Lincoln Town Car is shown to Sasha. Bely sends Shmit to the cemetery and says he follow onwards and introduces his new head of security and saying he explain everything to him later. When Shmit arrives, the funeral service is about to begin. As Belov, Olga and Ivan drive onto a causeway, the car is hit by an M72 LAW and falls into the river. The funeral mass is announced that Belov is killed.

=== Winter/Spring 2000 ===
Although announced in the opening credits, this part of the film was never announced. Belov's death allowed Maks and Kaverin to come out of hiding. Seeing a final end to his lifelong rival, he and Artur engage in a joint business venture, and are examining a construction site that is soon to open as a new shopping centre. Out of nowhere Bely appears and kills Maks, Artur, a few of their fellow thugs and finally Kaverin himself. Afterwards he explains to Inshakov how he staged his own death and how the car was empty when it exploded and went over into the river.

The film ends in spring when snow melted, Sasha once again visits Sparrow Hills, this time alone, and remembers how nine years ago he swore to always stand for his brothers. Repeating the words his same words, he adds that he swears he will never forget those who he called brothers, and with that cracks his watch on the railing. At the airport, Olga and Ivan, await Sasha to board the plane and leave Russia. While the final boarding is called, Olga gets a call from Sasha, who says he will not be joining them right now, because it's too dangerous for them, but will come in a couple of months. The tearful Olga walks into the airplane with Ivan. Sasha, standing on a causeway, watches the airplane depart. As he catches a taxi, a gunshot is heard and the screen turns black and the final credits begin to roll.

== Music ==
Reflective of Russians' affinity to music,- classical music and musical instruments are well represented in the series. Upright pianos are in the homes of Sasha's mother and Kosmos' father. Olga is a violinist and her rehearsing on a violin impresses Sasha to court her. Olga and Sasha attend a Bolshoi Theater performance of Swan Lake Waltz. This is a non-exhaustive list of music identified in the series:

- Tchaikowski Swan Lake Waltz in Bolshoi Theater performance
- Morning Mood by Peer Gynt (Grieg) during film review awards
- Rock Solid Blues return in a vegetable truck after a near death experience
- The Power (Snap! song) in a Doll's Bar accompaniment to exotic dancing
- Anitra's Dance by Peer Gynt (Grieg) where Sasha snorting his first cocaine with Kosmos
- Meant To Be by Squirrel Nut Zippers, performed by Olga and her band

== Criticism ==
The main complaints about the film are that it romanticizes banditry and relations between members of the criminal community in general, showing too attractive (especially for the youth audience) images of criminals.

A striking example of this is the fate that befell Leonid Sidorov — the son of the Director of the series, who from the age of 8 was kept in a boarding school, because his parents were deprived of the rights to his education. As a difficult teenager, at the peak of the popularity of the "Brigade" in the mid-2000s, he put together a gang around him, whose members appearance and relationships with each other imitated the main characters of the series; for himself, Leonid chose the image of "Space". Initially engaged in petty extortion from peers, the criminal group reached serious crimes. In 2006, Leonid was convicted of car theft, and in 2008 that was followed by a second conviction — 13 years in prison for robbery, double murder and rape.

However, throughout the film, his wife and friends constantly decry "Sasha White" because he chose a criminal path. The end of the film is far from optimistic: three of the four friends are killed, and Alexander Belov "goes underground", regretting the chosen path, because of which he lost everything.

In 2018 Pavel Maykov, the performer of the role of "The Bee" called the "Brigade" a crime against Russia in which he participated, and explained that the harm of the series is that because of him, "the boys wanted to become bandits".

== Cast ==
The actors who starred in the series became household names very soon after the series aired on television.

- Sergei Bezrukov as Alexandr Belov (Belyy/White) – The leader of the Brigada. He is smart and very business oriented but has numerous vices, such as infidelity. He cares deeply for his three friends and when one of them is considered to be a traitor, he refuses to believe it.
- Vladimir Vdovichenkov as Valeriy Filatov (Fil/Phil) – After Sasha he seems to be the most level-headed member of the group. He is a boxer early on and then becomes a stunt man. After a failed assassination attempt, he goes into a long coma for a year.
- Dmitri Dyuzhev as Kosmos Kholmogorov (Kosmos/Space) – The comic relief of the group. He's also the flashiest one. Later in the series Sasha finds it hard to trust Kosmos but ultimately they remain good friends. He develops a serious cocaine problem.
- Pavel Maykov as Viktor Pchyolkin (Pchyola/Bee) – The quiet soft-spoken member of the group. He is successful with women yet very confused sometimes. After what seemed like a treacherous act on his part, Sasha forgave him and ultimately discovered who the real perpetrator was.
- Yekaterina Guseva as Olga Belova (née Surikova) – Sasha's wife and only love. Throughout the decade they have their share of domestic squabbles, some more serious than others, but by the end they solidify their love. She is a violinist and was raised by her grandmother.
- Andrei Panin as the policeman Vladimir Kaverin – He is the perpetual villain throughout the series. He sort of comes and goes. In the beginning he is a corrupt cop who fails to nail Sasha. This drives him nearly mad and he decides to join up with Sasha's gang later on to wreak vengeance. He never got the chance as he was nearly killed in Chechnya and forced to stay with the military and lie low. He is a very slimy and snake-like character whose only drive is to kill Sasha Belov.

=== Minor roles ===
- Sergei Aprelsky — Mukha / Fly (ep. 1–2, 10)
- Mariya Aronova — Katya (ep. 5, 7-9, 15)
- Vitali Bezrukov — The dog lover (ep. 2)
- Aleksandr Belyavskiy — Viktor Petrovich (ep. 8-13, 11, 15)
- Aleksandra Budanova — Anyuta (ep. 8-11)
- Aleksandr Vysokovsky — Max (ep. 6, 8-9, 11-15)
- Sergei Garmash — SOBR general (ep. 12)
- Vyacheslav Grishechkin — A guy in Ryzhsky market (ep. 2-3)
- Dmitri Gumenetsky — Shmidt (ep. 7-15)
- Nikolai Yeremenko Jr. — Yuri Rostislavovich (Kosmos's father) (ep. 3-5, 10, 15)
- Mikhail Zhigalov — Thief in law Luka (ep. 8-9)
- stuntman Alexander Inshakov — himself (ep. 2-3, 6, 11-12, 15)
- Denis Kiris — District militsiya officer (ep. 2, 5)
- Aleksei Kravchenko — Vvedenskiy (ep. 4-9, 11, 13-14)
- Leonid Kuravlyov — MVD general (ep. 5-6)
- Farhad Mahmudov — Farhad Juraev (ep. 1, 6-8)
- Pyotr Merkuryev — Professor (ep. 4)
- Alla Mescheryakova — Pchyolkin's mother (ep. 11, 15)
- Alexandra Nazarova — Olga's Granny (ep. 2-5, 7-8, 10, 13-15)
- Viktor Pavlov — Pchyolkin's father (ep. 5, 11)
- Natalya Panova — Lena, Belov's (ex-)girlfriend (ep. 1)
- Darya Poverennova — Kosmos's stepmother (ep. 2-3)
- Mariya Poroshina — Tamara, Filatov's wife (ep. 5, 8, 11-15)
- Daniil Strakhov — Vitalik (ep. 6)
- Valentina Telichkina — Belov's mother (ep. 1-3, 7-10)
- Yan Tsapnik — Artur Lapshin, the businessman (ep. 4-6, 14-15)
- Svetlana Chuikina — Lyuda, Artur's secretary (ep. 4-5, 8, 14-15)
- Yana Shivkova — Vvedenskiy's wife (ep. 5, 7)
- Yuriy Dumchev — Brity

== Sequel ==
The author of the original book wrote a series of sequel novels which had Sasha start a new gang but it was met with lackluster reviews by critics, who said there was no chemistry between Sasha and the new gang like there was between him, Pchyola, Kosmos, and Fil. However, the book is still considered an interesting read for whoever enjoyed the first part.
