= Domovoy (film) =

2019 film directed by Yevgeny Bedarev

The House Elf
- Theatrical release poster
- Directed by: Yevgeny Bedarev (ru)
- Written by: Dmitry Bedarev; Yevgeny Bedarev
- Produced by: Sergey Torchilin; Andrey Shishkanov; Sergey Kulikov; Oleg Antipov; Dmitry Shcherbanov; Konstantin Yelkin; Vadim Goryainov; Mikhail Bespalov
- Starring: Sergey Chirkov; Yekaterina Guseva; Aleksandra Politik; Olga Ostroumova-Gutshmidt; Pavel Derevyanko
- Cinematography: Andrey Kuznetsov; Sergey Politik
- Edited by: Vladimir Voronin
- Music by: Mark Dorbsky
- Production companies: Trio Film; Sputnik Studio; Media-Trest; Cinema Fund; Ministry of Culture
- Distributed by: KaroRental
- Release date: 11 April 2019 (Russia)
- Running time: 104 minutes
- Country: Russia
- Languages: Russian; English
- Budget: ₽150 million; $2 million
- Box office: ₽120.3 million $1,842,316

The House Elf (Russian: Домовой, romanized: Domovoy) is a 2019 Russian dark fantasy comedy film based on the Domovoy in Russian, the film was written and directed by Yevgeny Bedarev and Dmitry Bedarev in the title role. The film is a real fairy tale, it's not just the fear of a poltergeist's room, but behind the mysterious elf, and who is the head in this house. The film stars Sergey Chirkov, Yekaterina Guseva, Aleksandra Politik, Olga Ostroumova-Gutshmidt, and Pavel Derevyanko voiced the cat Kuzya.

The House Elf is scheduled to be theatrically released in Russia on April 11, 2019, by KaroRental. The film was released on Netflix.

== Plot ==
The realtor Ella is unsuccessfully trying to sell an apartment in the Seven Sisters in Moscow, since a real Domovoy's house elf lives in it, who diligently survives any tenants from it, arranging them with various kinds of tricks a la poltergeist (people are unable to see or touch Domovoy himself). Because of this, the apartment has not been renovated for a long time and therefore the price for it is much lower than the market price. In the end, she manages to find a potential buyer, this is a divorced single mother Vika with her 8-year-old daughter Alina. Before the arrival of Vika and Alina, Ella invites the clairvoyant Fima to the apartment to drive Domovoy away.

Fima succeeds: with the help of her magic rituals, she throws him out of the house. However, at some point, she has a vision in which she sees that somewhere under the floor in the apartment is hidden a box of jewels. Since the apartment is about to leave Vika and it will no longer be possible to penetrate it, Fima, leaving, again performs a ritual, thanks to which Domovoy returns to the apartment and begins to commit atrocities. In the end, Ella, threatening to put only inveterate marginals into the apartment from now on, sets Domovoy a condition: he will allow Vika to buy an apartment (because every time Ella receives the interest due from the apartment), and then she can safely drive her away, and in return for Ella, for a whole year will leave the apartment alone. Domovoy agrees, after which he applies his magic to the frightened Vika and Alina, who calm down and agree to the deal.

Attempts to survive Vika with her daughter, Domovoy takes immediately. But Vika is not ready to lose the apartment: after learning from Raisa's neighbor about Domovoy and about the previous tenants, she begins to invite psychics and shamans to the house. And the more she resists Domovoy, the more he shows zeal in his mischief. Alina, on the contrary, is trying to make friends with Domovoy, and at some point he even penetrates her with tender feelings, but at the same time is not going to stop. This leads to the fact that Vika is first fired from work (after Domovoy's leprosy brought her boss to hospitalization), and then she accidentally gets an electric shock and she goes to the hospital. After this, Domovoy has a conversation with the cat of Alina and Vika (who can see Domovoy and communicate with him). It turns out that Domovoy has been living in this apartment since the construction of the house and got along very well with the first family of new settlers. But after some time this family moved, and Domovoy was forced to stay, because the Domovoy's can change their place of residence only if they receive an invitation. He tried to make friends with the following new residents, but each new family turned out to be worse than the previous one, because there was neither love nor kindness in them. At some point, Domovoy discovered that the negative environment around him was projecting his own perception of this onto the apartment itself - the walls began to mold and crumble. Wishing to prevent the apartment from collapsing, Domovoy eventually decided to survive all the new tenants. The cat Kuzya then advises Domovoy to make peace with Vika anyway, because she and Alina, in fact, are exactly who he needs: Vika resisted Domovoy primarily in order to secure Alina. Kuzya also claims that if he still survives Vika and Alina, then new owners will come after them, with whom Domovoy will again have a war and everything will be repeated indefinitely. Then Domovoy agrees.

Taking advantage of Vika's hospitalization, Fima and her son Stas enter The apartment (here Domovoy explains to Kuzya that the jewelry they are looking for remained from one of the previous residents who was buying up stolen goods). Vika and Alina return home inopportunely. Despite the magic that Fima exposes Domovoy, he still manages to give her and Stas a powerful rebuff and throw them out of the apartment. Alina at some point, fleeing from Stas crawls out the window and falls from the ledge, but Domovoy manages to throw her in the window located on the floor below the apartment where the young guy Andrey lives, who then begins an affair with Vika. In the finals, Vika apologizes to Domovoy, offers to make peace, and then shows that she now knows what he looks like: their neighbor Valentina has a hobby to photograph all the former tenants of the apartment at the moment they leave her, and in the photograph he took that the moment when Alina and Vika ran out of the apartment (this happened on the first night after they moved in) Domovoy was somehow imprinted. Vika invites Domovoy to become a full member of their family.

== Cast ==
- Sergey Chirkov as domovoy, a home elf
- Yekaterina Guseva as Vika
- Aleksandra Politik as Alina
- Olga Ostroumova-Gutshmidt as witch Fima
- Pavel Derevyanko as cat (voice)
- Yulia Sules as Ella Arkadyevna, a realtor
- Tatyana Orlova as Raisa Ivanovna
- Sergey Rubeko as Valentin Petrovich
- Dmitry Bedarev as Stas, Fima's son
- Sergey Russkin as demonologist

== Production ==
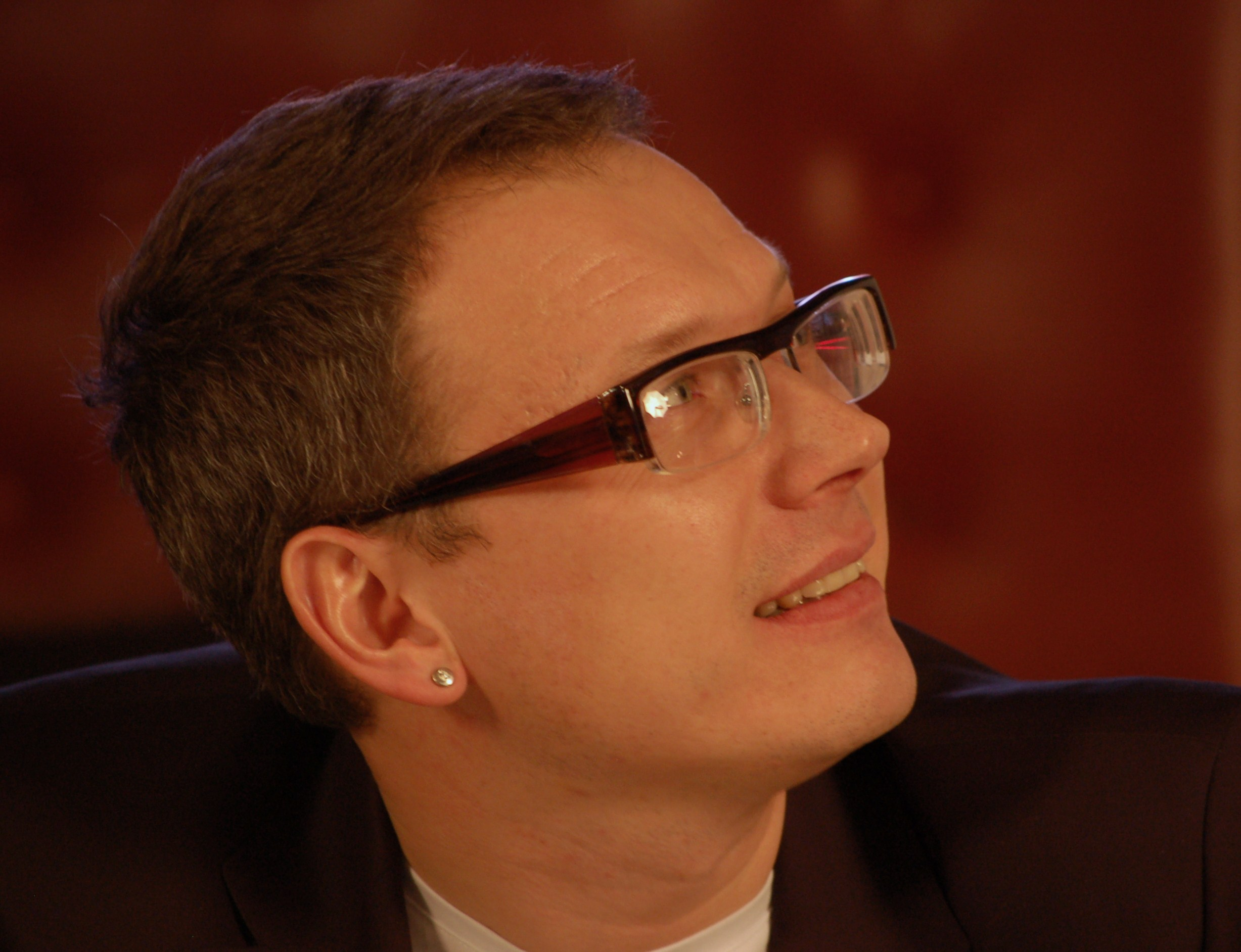
Directed by Yevgeny Bedarev

=== Casting ===
The main roles are performed by Yekaterina Guseva, Sergey Chirkov, Yulia Sules and others. Another of the main characters in the film was a cat, and this role was played by four four-legged artists from the Kuklachyov's cats theater under the direction of Yuri Kuklachyov. Thanks to computer graphics, the cat in the film is spoken by Pavel Derevyanko, who voiced the cat Kuzya, and it looks very organic.

=== Filming ===
Principal photography began on November 1, 2018, and took place in the legendary house on Kotelnicheskaya Embankment Building in Moscow. The production of fantasy tape was engaged in the film Studio "Trio Film".

== Release ==
The film held a premiere in Moscow on April 8, 2019. It was theatrically released in Russia on 11 April 2019, the distributor is film company "KaroRental".

=== Marketing ===
The House Elf / Domovoy, Official Trailer in English

== Reception ==
=== Critical response ===
The film received positive ratings from film critics.

- Boris Grishin wrote: "Before us is a good urban tale in which there is no real evil, so both young children and their grandmothers will watch the film with pleasure".
- Marina Podkorytova: "Yevgeny Bedarev (ru) turned out a very good fantasy-style film shot by Russians and in Russian. It turned out that on the basis of folk tales and beliefs, without using foreign cliches and heroes, you can remove a good fairy tale".
