= Anna Kovalchuk =

Russian actress

- Анна Ковальчук
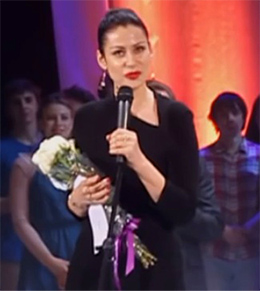
- Kovalchuk in 2015
- Born: Anna Leonidovna Kovalchuk; 15 June 1977 (age 48); Neustrelitz, East Germany
- Occupation: Actress
- Years active: 1998–present
- Spouse(s): Anatoly Ilichenko (1999 - 2005 divorced, 1 child); Oleg Kapustin (m. 2007, 1 child)
- Awards: People's Artist of Russia

Anna Leonidovna Kovalchuk (Russian: А́нна Леони́довна Ковальчу́к; born 15 June 1977) is a Russian actress known for her roles in film, television, and theater. She gained widespread recognition for her performances in popular Russian television series and the critically acclaimed miniseries adaptation of Mikhail Bulgakov's novel, The Master and Margarita.

== Early life and education ==
Kovalchuk was born in Neustrelitz, German Democratic Republic (GDR). She comes from a family with a background in teaching, as her parents were hereditary teachers. Her mother worked as a kindergarten manager, while her father served in the military. Her grandfather was a school principal. Anna has an older brother named Pavel.

Kovalchuk spent her school days in Leningrad, with some periods of her childhood also spent in Yerevan and Moscow. During her school years, she developed a fondness for the exact sciences, particularly mathematics. After completing her secondary education, Kovalchuk initially planned to pursue a career in cybernetics and intended to enroll at the Leningrad Polytechnical Institute. However, she later decided to follow her passion for acting and joined the Leningrad Theatrical Institute of Music and Cinematography.

== Career ==
In 1998, Kovalchuk graduated from the St. Petersburg Academy of Theatre, Music, and Cinema. Following her graduation, she became a member of the Lensovet Theatre, where she has been actively involved since then.

Kovalchuk gained significant popularity through her role as Inspector Maria Shvetsova in the television series Secrets of Investigation in 2001. The success of the series helped establish her as a prominent actress in Russian television.

One of Kovalchuk's notable achievements was her portrayal of Margarita in the highly acclaimed Russian television miniseries The Master and Margarita, directed by Vladimir Bortko. The series, released in 2005, was an adaptation of the renowned novel by Mikhail Bulgakov, a prominent Soviet satirist.

== Personal life ==
In the year 2000, Kovalchuk gave birth to her daughter, whom she named Zlata. During the filming of the first series of Secrets of Investigation, it was revealed that Kovalchuk was pregnant. The filmmakers decided to incorporate her pregnancy into the storyline, and scenes featuring her breastfeeding her baby were included in the series.

Following the conclusion of the filming of The Master and Margarita in June 2005, Kovalchuk announced her divorce from her then-husband, Anatoly Ilchenko, who also appeared in the miniseries. Subsequently, she began a relationship with businessman Oleg Kapustin. The couple married on 1 December 2007 in St. Petersburg, and as a wedding gift, Kapustin presented Kovalchuk with a thoroughbred racehorse. On 30 April 2010, the couple welcomed their son, Dobrynja.

== Selected filmography ==
- 1998 Shallow Hal as princess
- 2000–2018 Tainy Sledstviya (TV Series) as Maria Shvetsova
- 2003 Peculiarities of National Politics
- 2004 Against the stream (TV Series) as Anna
- 2004 Usad'ba (The Manor) (TV Series) as Elena Semenova
- 2005 The Master and Margarita (Miniseries) as Margarita
- 2006 Rhymes with love as Olga
- 2006 Rush Hour as Evgenya Arkhipova
- 2008 Admiral as Sofia Kolchak
- 2008 Can I call you mom? as Daria Semenova
- 2009 Admiral (TV series) as Sofia Kolchak
- 2009 And there was war as Elizabeth
- 2009 Personal File captain Ryumin (TV series) as Lisa
- 2011 Peter the Great: The Testament (Miniseries) as Anastasia Trubetskaya
- 2016 About love as Tamara
