= Tajik mafia =

Organized crime syndicate

The Tajik mafia (Russian: Таджикская мафия; Tajik (persian script): تاجک مافيا) is a general term for Tajik organized crime syndicates which run operations in an area from the Tajikistan capital Dushanbe to the northern Afghanistan provinces of Badakhshan, Panjshir, Balkh, and Jawzjan. Tajik organized crime groups are involved in heroin, weapons and human trafficking, as well as pimping, human smuggling and slave labor. Currently, their criminal operations are limited by the conflict with the Taliban armed groups, Afghan clan militias and Uzbek organized crime groups. They also run operations in the Russian capital of Moscow since the 1990s and are prevalent in the city and country as one of the biggest running mafias. Currently, their activities in Moscow and other cities have weakened as a result of energetic police actions, the liquidation of illegal workplaces and hotels for illegal immigrants controlled by gangs. In addition, the conflict with Uzbek and Afghan criminal groups has weakened the position of Tajik gangs. However, the greatest threat is posed by the Chechen mafia, which in agreement with the Russian mafia eliminates foreign immigrant gangs.
