= Yekaterina Guseva =

Russian actress and singer (born 1976)

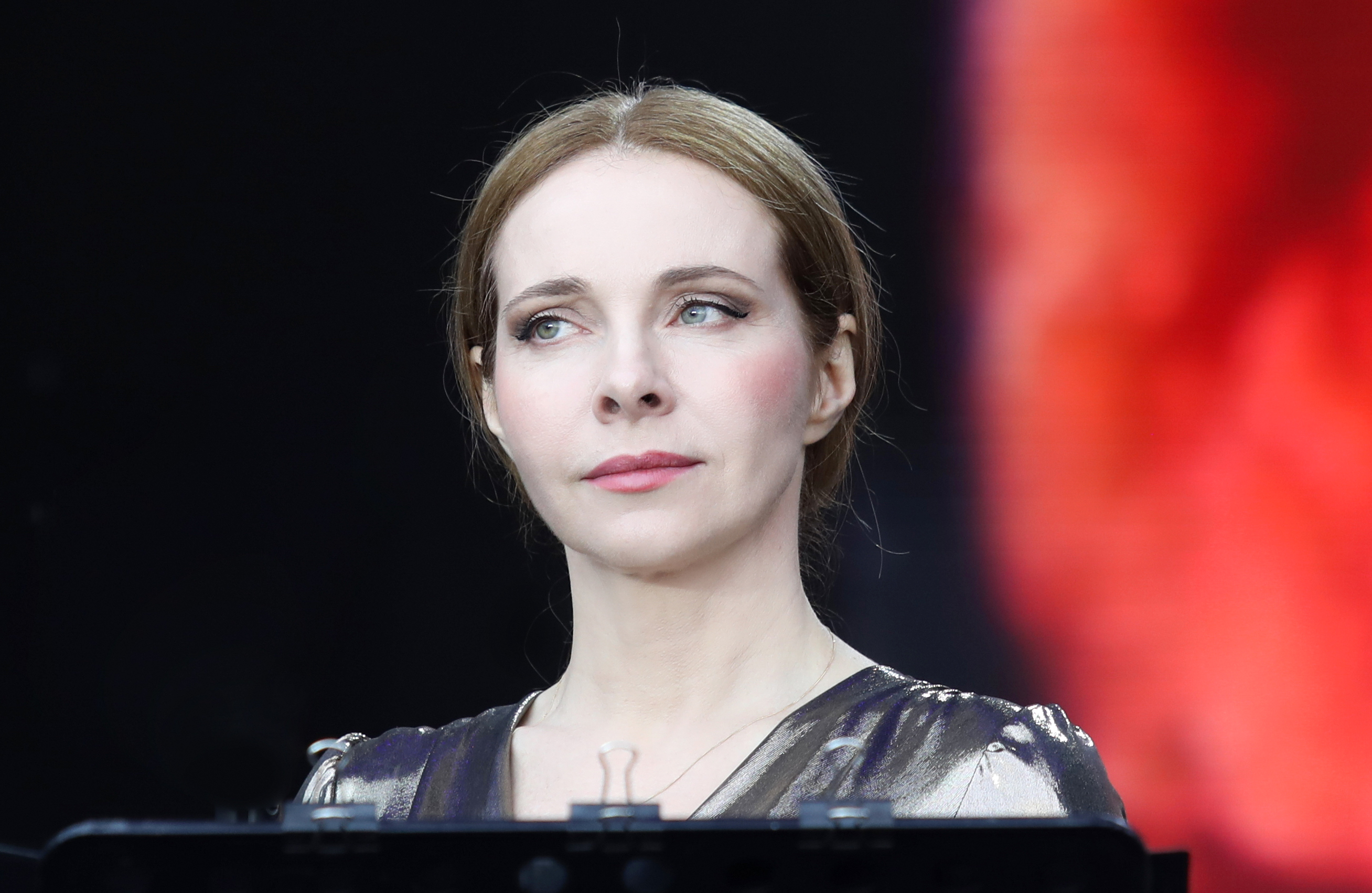
- Guseva in 2024
- Born: Yekaterina Konstantinovna Guseva; 9 July 1976 (age 50); Moscow, RSFSR, USSR
- Citizenship: Russia
- Occupations: actress, singer
- Years active: 1997-present
- Notable work: "Olga Belova" in Brigada
- Partner: Vladimir Abashkin
- Children: 2
- Parents: Konstantin Vasilyevich Gusev (father); Tamara Mikhailovna Guseva (mother)
- Website: ekaterinaguseva.ru

Yekaterina Konstantinovna Guseva (Russian: Екатери́на Константи́новна Гу́сева; 9 July 1976) is a Russian film, theater, TV actress and singer, Meritorious Artist of Russia. She became known for her role in the 2002 television series Brigada.

== Early life ==
In Guseva's childhood, her father played the violin; it was his violin depicted in the series Brigada. Her younger sister, Nastya, works as a methodologist in a kindergarten.

By age four, she was already part of the modern gymnastics resource group for the Soviet Union's representative team. She also tried figure skating and swimming. Seven years before finishing school, Katya was involved in the Georgian dance ensemble Kolkhida and managed to perform in the Bolshoi.

While planning to enroll at the Moscow Biotechnology Institute, she was approached by an assistant to theatre director Evgeny Simonov who suggested she should apply for the V.V. Shukina Performing Arts College. She gave it a try, prepared for the entry exam during three days, and made it with ease.

== Life and career ==
After graduation in 1997, Yekaterina played a major role in the film Snake Spring by Nikolai Lebedev. Then, she was invited by Mark Rozovsky to his theater "Nikitsky Gate." After working for four years in Rozovsky theater, she won the role of Katya Tatarinova in the musical Nord-Ost by Alexei Ivashchenko and Georgi Vasiliev. During preparation for "Nord-Ost" premier, Yekaterina earned fame by playing a major role in the popular Russian crime miniseries Brigada. She had a day off during the terrorist attack on the theater in October 2002. Since 2003 she works in Mossovet Theatre.

In addition to playing in many popular Russian movies, Yekaterina performs songs as a solo singer and together with Leonid Serebrennikov and others. She released her first solo music CD album in 2007.

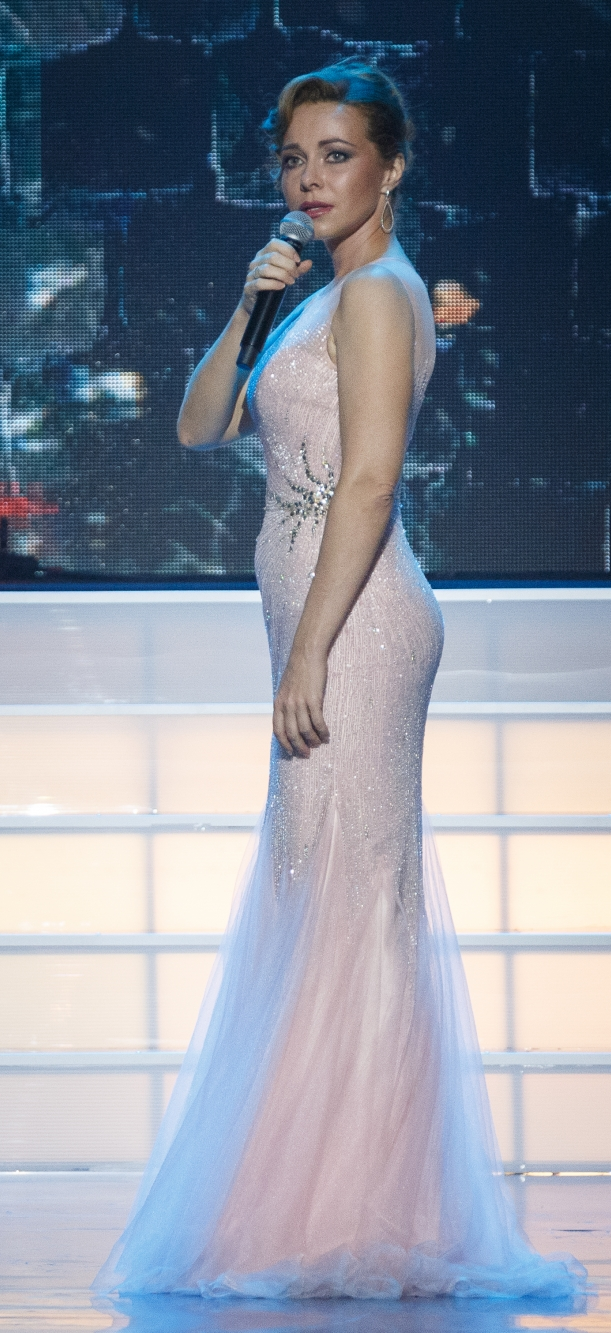

== Family ==
Yekaterina Guseva is married to businessman Vladimir Abashkin. They have two children.

== Selected filmography ==
=== Television ===
Year	Title	Original Title	Role
1998-03	The Impostors	Самозванцы	
1999	Live Pushkin	Живой Пушкин	
1999	Request Stop	Остановка по требованию	Katya
2001	Displaced	Сдвинутый	
2002	Brigada	Бригада	Olga Belova
2003	I'm Looking for a Bride Without a Dowry	Ищу невесту без приданого	Bera Ignatova
2004	Cadets	Курсанты	nurse Liza
2004	The Sky and the Earth	Небо и земля	Marina Shvedova
2005	Yesenin	Есенин	Avgusta Miklashevskaya
2005	To Hunt an Elk	Охота на изюбря	Irina
2006	Rush Hour	Час пик	Kseniya Bazhenova
2008	Save Our Souls	Спасите наши души	Nadezhda Hrunicheva
2008	Hot ice	Жаркий лёд	Natalia Trofimova
2008	Photographer	Фотограф	Alla Litvak
2010	Palm Sunday	Вербное воскресенье	Margarita Polozkova
2010	I'm Not Myself	Я не я	Lena
2010	If I Loved You ...	Если бы я тебя любил...	Tatiana
2010	Brest. Serf Heroes	Крепостные герои	
2011	Lektor	Лектор	Kira
2013	Tamarka	Тамарка	Tamara
2014	Talyanka	Тальянка	Tatyana
2016	Thin Ie	Тонкий лед	Irina Palagina

=== Films ===
Year	Title	Original Title	Role
1997	Snake Spring	Змеиный источник	Dina
1998	Billboard	Billboard (Poland, 1998)	Tania
1998	Paradise Apple	Райское яблочко	
2001	Happy Birthday, Lola!	С днём рождения, Лола!	Lola
2001	Pale-faced Liar	Бледнолицый лжец	Nastenyka
2002	Intimate life Sebastiano Bakhova	Интимная жизнь Севастиана Бахова	Katya
2003	Shield of Minerva	Щит Минервы	Margo
2004	On Upper Maslovka Street	На верхней Масловке	Katya
2005	From 180 and Taller	От 180 и выше	Oksana
2006	Peak Hour	Час пик	Kseniya
2006	Tanker Tango	Танкер Танго	Anna
2007	He, She and I	Он, она и я	Masha Arsenyeva
2007	The Runaways	Беглянки	Anya Zinovieva
2007	Thanks for the Love!	Спасибо за любовь!	as Lara
2007	Platki	Платки	Anna
2009	The Man Who Knew Everything	Человек, который знал всё	Irina
2010	Walk through Paris	Прогулка по Парижу	Polina
2011	Goldfish in N	Золотая рыбка в городе Н	Marusya
2012	Brigada 2	Бригада-2	Olga Belova
2013	12 months	12 месяцев	Natalia Chernomor, the owner of club
2013	Heal the Fear	Излечить страх	Anna Lanskya
2013	Invisible	Невидимки	Rita Muraveva
2013	Weekend	Weekend	Zhanna
2018	Tobol	Тобол	Catherine I of Russia
2019	Domovoy	Домовой	mother
2022	Amanat	Аманат	Maria Olenina

=== Theatre ===
Teatr "U Nikitskih vorot" (1997—2001):

- Bednaya Liza (Бедная Лиза)
- Doktor Chekhov (Доктор Чехов)
- Romansy s Oblomovym (Романсы с Обломовым)
- Lyubov' i zhizn' ubitogo studenta (Любовь и жизнь убитого студента)
- Gambrinus (Гамбринус)
- Ubivets (Убивец)
- Utinaya okhota (Утиная охота)
- Tri porosenka (Три поросёнка, English title: Three Little Pigs)

Prodyuserskaya kompaniya "Link" (2001—2003):

- Nord-Ost

Mezhdunarodnoe teatral'noe agentstvo "Art-Partner XXI" (2002):

- Stoletnik (Столетник)

Mossovet Theatre (2003—present):

- Uchitel' tantsev (Учитель танцев)
- Strannaya istoriya doktora Dzhekila i mistera Hayda (Странная история доктора Джекила и мистера Хайда, English title: Strange Case of Dr Jekyll and Mr Hyde)
- V prostranstve Tennessi U. (В пространстве Теннесси У.)
- Iisus Khristos — superzvezda (Иисус Христос - суперзвезда, English title: Jesus Christ Superstar)
- Tsarstvo otsa i syna (Царство отца и сына)

Teatrium na Serpuhovke (2006—present):

- Drakon (Дракон)

Stage Entertainment (October 2008 - April 2010):

- Krasavitsa i Chudovishche (Красавица и чудовище, English title: Beauty and the Beast)

Moskovskaya gosudarstvennaya akademicheskaya filarmoniya (2009):

- Skazki s orkestrom (Сказки с оркестром)
