= Popsa =

- Directed by: Elena Nikolaeva
- Written by: Yuri Korotkov
- Produced by: Mikhail Babakhanov
- Starring: Yelena Velikanova; Tatyana Vasilyeva; Dmitry Pevtsov
- Cinematography: Andrey Zhegalov
- Edited by: Igor Litoninsky
- Music by: Yuri Poteyenko
- Production company: Saturn
- Distributed by: Gelvars
- Release date: 2005
- Running time: 111 min.
- Country: Russia
- Language: Russian

Popsa (Russian: Попса) is a Russian musical drama film, released in 2005. The film was directed by Elena Nikolaeva. It is a film about the enduring passion of the inhabitants of the remote area to Moscow.

== Plot ==
Slavka, an 18-year-old from the small town of Verkhnevilyuysk, arrives in Moscow with dreams of fame and a business card from Larisa Ivanovna, a well-known producer who visited her hometown on tour with singer Vlad Boytsov. Soon after her arrival, Slavka witnesses Larisa kicking her boyfriend, singer Dmitry Gromov, out of her apartment. As they spend the day together, Larisa initially sees Slavka as just another naive small-town girl, but she gradually recognizes a unique and genuine character behind her innocent demeanor. Larisa decides to consider Slavka as her new protégé, but only if Slavka goes home and returns in a year.

Following Larisa, Slavka uncovers the harsh realities of show business: the superficiality, substance abuse, and the darker side of ambition, including abandoned careers and personal ruin. After meeting her idol Boytsov and spending the night at his place, Slavka is ambushed by jealous fans who violently attack her. Before leaving, she gives one of the fans her blood-stained jacket, telling her to save it as a keepsake, promising, "Remember my name—Slavka."

== Cast ==
- Yelena Velikanova as Slavka
- Tatyana Vasilyeva as Larisa Ivanovna
- Dmitry Pevtsov as Dmitry Gromov
- Vsevolod Shilovsky as Yefim Ilyich Rakitin
- Lolita Milyavskaya as Irina Pepelyaeva
- Oleg Nepomnyashchy as Yulik
- Lyanka Gryu as Alisa
- Aleksey Garnizov as composer
- Valery Garkalin as Lev Malinovsky
- Ivan Rudakov as Vlad, rock star
- Bari Alibasov as cameo

== Soundtrack ==
- Yevgeny Osin — The Golden Dream
- Elena Masaltseva / Ivan Rudakov — Playing the Flute at Night
- Elena Masaltseva — The Bird
- Yuri Poteyenko — Theme
- Dmitry Chernus — Lennon, Marley, Che Gevara
- Velvet — I Want to Be Alive
- Lolita Milyavskaya — Prisoner to Love
- Ivan Rudakov — The Guitar
