= Elena Nikolaeva (film director) =

Russian film director (born 1955)

Elena Vladislavovna Nikolaeva (Russian: Елена Владиславовна Николаева, born September 13, 1955, in Krasnoyarsk) is a Russian film director.

== Biography ==
Nikolaeva is of Polish descent. She studied at the Faculty of History of Moscow State University, but after a while I took the documents. She worked on Abakan television.

In 1981 she graduated from the Directing Department of VGIK (workshop of Efim Dzigan).

In the 1990s, the 20th and first half of the 21st century worked in documentary films and advertising.

== Personal life ==
Nikolaeva's husband, Alexey Rudakov is a film director, and screenwriter. Her son, Ivan Rudakov, was an actor and a rock singer who acted in some of her films, such as Popsa and Vanechka. Ivan Rudakov died from COVID-19 complications at the age of 43, on January 16, 2022.

== Bibliography ==
- Natalia Miloserdova. Cinema of Russia: New Names (1986-1995). — M .: Research Institute of Motion Picture Arts, 1996.
