= Yelena Velikanova =

Russian actress

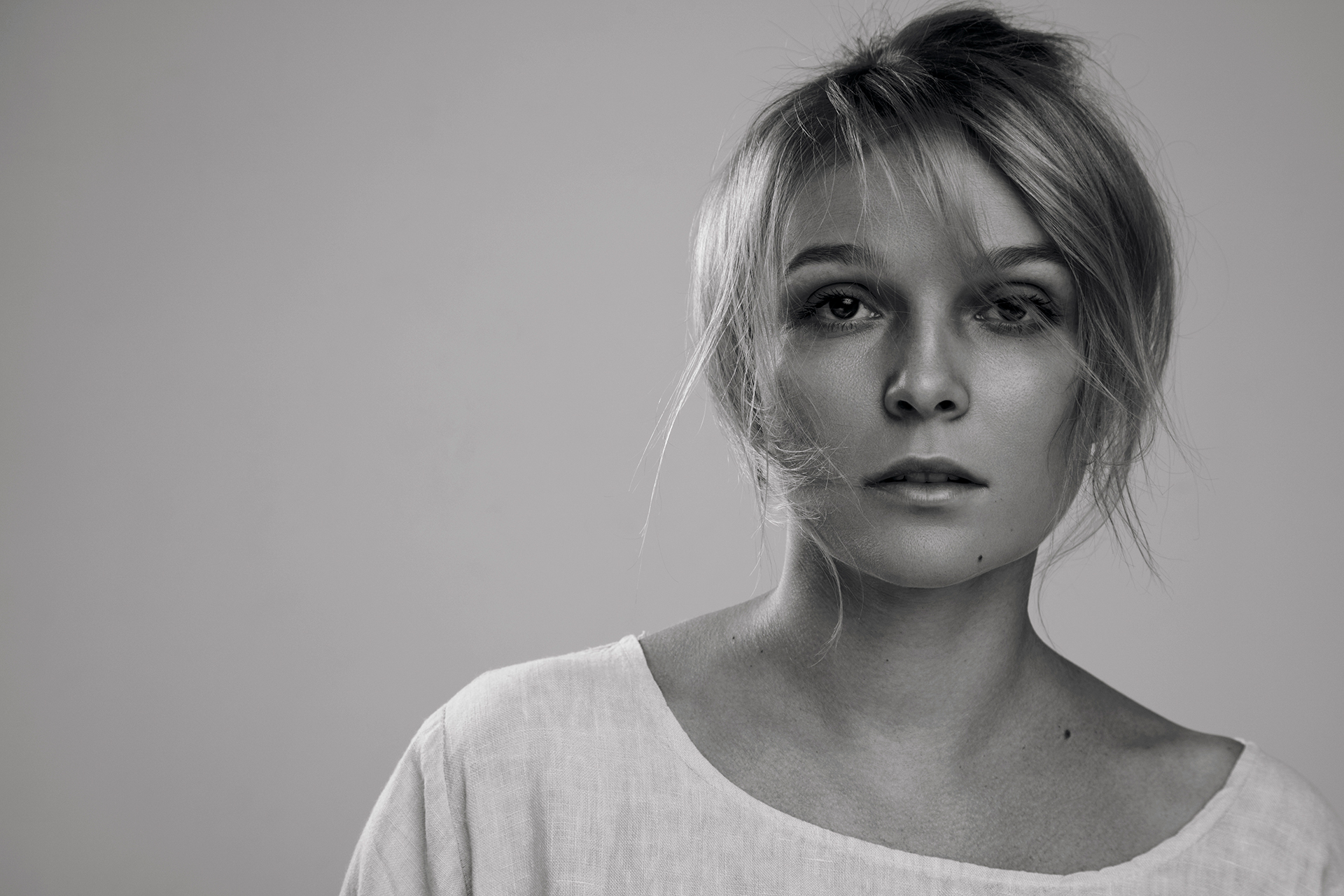
Velikanova in 2016

Yelena Sergeyevna Velikanova (Russian: Еле́на Серге́евна Велика́нова; born October 5, 1984, Moscow, RSFSR, USSR) is a Russian theatre, film and voice actress.

== Career ==
In 2001, Yelena entered the Mikhail Shchepkin Higher Theatre School at the State Academic Maly Theater of Russia in Moscow (artistic director of the course Vitaly Ivanov; teacher Vladimir Beilis), which she graduated from, in 2005.

Since 2008, she has been involved in the dubbing of the animated franchise Disney Fairies, being the voice of the fairy Vidia (in the original Pamela Adlon's voice).

In February 2008, she became the Girl of the Month for the Russian version of MAXIM Magazine.

== Selected filmography ==
- Popsa (2005) as Slavka
- Vanechka (2007) as Nadya
- The Best Movie (2008) as Nastya Korinovaya
- Jack Ryan: Shadow Recruit (2014) as Katya
- 257 Reasons to Live (2020) as Olya

== Personal life ==
Yelena bears the surname of her stepfather, whose great-aunt is the famous Soviet pop singer Gelena Velikanova (1923-1998).

Yelena has a son Mikhail (born 2010). Yelena has been divorced on 2018

After the start of Russia's war against Ukraine in 2022, she supported the Ukrainian side, moved to Kyiv and began running social networks in the Ukrainian language.
