= Shadowboxing (2005 film) =

- Russian film poster
- Directed by: Aleksei Sidorov
- Written by: Aleksei Sidorov
- Produced by: Ruben Dishdishyan
- Starring: Denis Nikiforov; Yelena Panova; Andrey Panin
- Music by: Aleksei Shelygin
- Distributed by: Central Partnership
- Release date: 17 March 2005
- Running time: 132 minutes
- Country: Russia
- Languages: Russian; English

Shadowboxing (Russian: Бой с тенью, romanized: Boy s tenyu; literally "Fight with Shadow") is a 2005 Russian 4-episode sports drama movie.

The film stars Denis Nikiforov, Yelena Panova, and Andrey Panin, and it was directed by Aleksey Sidorov. The title track from the music score was performed by Finnish cello rock band Apocalyptica.

The film's sequel, Shadowboxing 2: Revenge, was released in Russia in 2007.

== Plot ==
Artyom Kolchin, the story's protagonist, is a boxer, who has become a contender for the world boxing championship. The whole country knows him and wants him to win. In the beginning of the film, while they are both waiting at a crosswalk for the light to change, Sasha Belov asks for his autograph for his son Ivan, who is in England and is learning boxing. Artyom likes his car and Sasha says he will give it to Artyom if he wins the fight. Valiyev, a man well known in both the criminal and business worlds, takes care of Artyom and refuses to accept the fights scenario presented by the opponent's manager, according to which Artyom should lose the first fight, win a return-match; after the third fight both opponents will be famous and TV channels will fight to get permission to show the match. However, Artyom cannot fight because he has eye problems. The doctor does not want to grant him permission to fight, but he asks her very pitifully, and, unable to endure the begging, she gives him the permit.

During the fight in the ring, Aryom receives a severe blow and his vision becomes worse and worse. Soon, he can only guess where his opponent is, and after a short attack exchange, he loses consciousness.

Artem ends up in a hospital; the doctor, who has fallen in love with him, visits him and tells him the diagnosis: Retinal detachment. At the moment, it is possible to save his sight, she says, but the blindness is going to progress. If it is not cured in three days, it will never be curable. The operation costs $30,000. Artyom does not have this much money, and neither does the doctor. Artyom had been like a son to his benefactor, Valiyev, who has several million dollars, but Artyom has disappointed him, so he refuses to pay for the operation.

The only thing Artyom can do is to violate the law to save his own sight and his new love, the doctor Victoria. She becomes a witness to a murder of her ex-boyfriend who was a drug dealer and to whom she came to borrow money, so someone is after her in order to arrest her, kill her, and register her death as an accident. A hired killer is also hunting her. She, her teenage communist brother Konstantin (Kostya), and Artyom hide. The police are told to hunt Artyom but they are given no instructions and the policemen do not know why they must watch him.

Artyom, with Kostya's help, prepares to rob a bank belonging to Valiyev. They buy a powerful fire cracker and put it into a beer can. Kostya passes the guard, holding the can and gets stopped. He is told that he may not bring beer into the bank. Konstantin agrees, throws the can into a trash bin and walks away to hide at a corner. Artyom goes into the bank, pulls a debit card from his pocket and feigns trying to get cash from the ATM. A guard helps him. At that moment, cash messengers arrive. Kostya detonates the firecracker, and Artyom attacks the guards and the cashiers. When nearly everyone is knocked down, one cashier pulls out his gun. Artyom hears the trigger click and knocks down this cashier too.

One of Artyom's fans arranges for Artyom to have an illegal operation. After the procedure, Artyom's eyes are bandaged. Valiyev's people get him, but Artyom does not know it. They bring him to Valiyev's house and discover his eyes, but Artyom pretends he still cannot see. Valiyev says: "You're not in a hospital." They are going to torture Artyom to learn where the money is, and then continue to torture him until he dies. But Artyom's feigned helplessness stills their suspicions, and they leave the room, leaving only two men there. Artyom asks them to fetch some water for him. One man goes for water. Artyom then calls another man and tells him that he stole more than 2 million dollars, he will not return the money to Valiyev so he wants to tell him (the second guard) where the money is. The guard bends down over his bed, and Artyom suddenly knocks him down. He knocks down the other guard and leaves the house.

During an open air play of Richard III, a hired killer finds Vika. Artyom gave her a gun before being taken to the operation, so she pulls it out and points it at the killer, but her hands are trembling and she is not able to pull the trigger. Grinning, the killer slowly takes the gun and points it at Vika just as Artyom appears behind his back and hits him.

A bit later Valiyev finds Artyom and shoots him. Artyom is badly wounded, arrested and taken to a hospital. Next day the FSB arrests Valiyev.

After some years have passed, Artyom's term of imprisonment is over. He is let out and is met by Vika and their mutual friends. Suddenly, someone calls one of his friends and asks in English to call Artyom. Artyom answers. The camera quickly pans from the prison's walls to Las Vegas. The caller is Larry, his opponent in the fight during which he lost ability to see. He says he knows that Artyom is free and asks him if he wants a rematch. Artem is silent. Larry repeats his question, "I said, how 'bout a rematch?". The camera quickly pans back and shows wild snowy field and far forest. Artyom looks at the field, smiles widely and lowers the phone and the film ends without showing the answer.

== Cast ==
- Denis Nikiforov as Artyom Kolchin
- Yelena Panova as Vika
- Ivan Makarevich as Kostya
- Dmitryi Shevchenko as Nechayev
- Andrey Panin as Vagit Valiyev
- Gas Redwood as Larry Palmer
- John Amos as Hill
- Alexander Kuznetsov as "Snake"
- Pavel Derevyanko as Timokha
- Irina Dymchenko as Vika's Mother
- Sergey Bezrukov as Sasha Beliy

== See also ==
- List of boxing films
