= Shadowboxing 2: Revenge =

Revenge
- Directed by: Anton Megerdichev
- Written by: Aleksei Sidorov
- Starring: Denis Nikiforov; Yelena Panova; Andrey Panin; Victor Hermínio López; Rico Devereaux; Pavel Derevyanko
- Music by: Aleksei Shelygin
- Release date: 18 October 2007
- Running time: 132 minutes
- Country: Russia
- Language: Russian / English

Revenge (Russian: Бой с тенью 2: Реванш, romanized: Boy s tenyu 2. Revansh; literally "Fight with Shadow 2") is a 2007 Russian sports drama movie.

The film is a sequel to Shadowboxing and was followed by Shadowboxing 3: Last Round which was released in 2011 in Russia.

== Plot ==
Five years have passed, four of which Artyom spent in custody. American boxing manager Michael once again makes Artyom an offer to have a rematch with Larry Palmer, who is now the absolute world champion and the owner of three belts. Unexpectedly, Artyom agrees. He moves to the US and starts training, and soon Vika comes to see him.

Artyom goes through several successful battles and with triumph progresses to battle for the title of absolute champion. The date of the battle has already been fixed, but at this time an emergency occurs. Caesar, one of the boxers from the gym where Artyom trains, has disliked him from the very beginning and provokes Artyom to fight as a result of which Artyom administers a powerful knockout. Caesar dies without leaving the coma. It turns out that his father - Felix Mendez, is an influential mafioso and the head of the drug cartel. He swears to avenge the death of his son by killing Artyom. After an invasion which occurred at night on their apartment, Artyom sends Vika to Moscow, but at the airport she is taken hostage by Mendez' people. Artyom has three days to rescue Vika from captivity and for himself to come to Mendez' to die.

Lawyer Julia, working with Michael, retrieves a file on Mendez from which Artyom learns that Mendez was once a colleague of Vagit Valiev, but then had a dispute with him. Valiev is imprisoned near Vladimir, and Artyom comes to Moscow and asks Colonel Nechaev to arrange Valiev's escape so that he in turn can help the colonel find Mendez. During Valiev's getaway, his people start to shoot the colonel's operatives, as a result of which Artyom and the wounded Valiev hide out alone and come to the United States under assumed names.

Valiev, having promised Artyom to neutralize Mendez, instead gives him over to Mendez, and Artyom is brought to the same cell where they hold Vika. However, Valiev receives a picture on his phone which shows that his son Fyodor (who lives in the US) was also taken hostage, and in the end Artyom and Vika are released in exchange for Fyodor. Artyom manages to come in time for the weigh in, but he is badly beaten and doctors do not recommend him to participate in the battle.

Nevertheless, the next day Artyom competes against Larry Palmer and in a grueling battle triumphs, becoming a champion. He realizes that now Mendez can not be prevented from killing him and returns home with a foreboding of death. However when Mendez comes with his people, his own assassin Manuel kills him. It becomes clear that he did it on the orders of Valiev. Manuel becomes the head of the cartel. Artyom returns to Moscow and again meets with Vika, making her an offer of marriage.

== Cast ==
- Denis Nikiforov as Artyom Kolchin
- Yelena Panova as Vika
- Andrey Panin as Valiev
- Pavel Derevyanko as Timokha
- Darrick Akey as Photographer
- Peter Arpesella as Marek
- Jeremy Batiste as Diego
- Victor Hermínio López as Felix Mendez
- Giovanni Bejarano as Marco
- Rico Devereaux as Thug
- Alvaro Orlando as Cesar Mendez
- Ekaterina Maikova as Julia
- Anthony Ray Parker as Baddy MacDir

== See also ==
- List of boxing films
