= Yelena Panova (actress) =

Russian actress (born 1977)

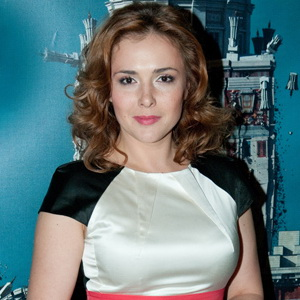
- Born: Yelena Viktorovna Panova; June 9, 1977 (age 49); Arkhangelsk, Soviet Union
- Occupation: Actress
- Years active: 1997–present

Yelena Viktorovna Panova also Elena Panova (Russian: Елéна Ви́кторовна Панóва; born 9 June 1977) is a Russian actress. A noted stage actress at the Moscow Art Theater, she has been active in film and television since 1997. She is a recipient of the State Prize of the Russian Federation (2001).

== Biography ==
Panova's father was a theater director and an art director of the Arkhangelsk Regional Youth Theatre and her mother is a piano teacher at Arkhangelsk Pedagogical College. Her elder sister is also an actress. Panova graduated from the school-studio of Moscow Art Theater in 1999 and joined the same theater. At the theatre she has had some notable roles including Catherine in The Storm, Glagolev in Petticoat Government, The Governess in The Light Shines in the Darkness, Mavka in Forest Song, Kate in The Light Taste of Betrayal and Sonia in Crime and Punishment.

She debuted in 1997 in the movie Christmas Story and then played a Russian prostitute in Daniel Schmid's Swiss picture Beresina, or the Last Days of Switzerland (1999). In 2002 she starred alongside Inna Gomes and Sergey Gorobchenko Yuriy Moroz's crime film Kamenskaya: Za vse nado platit. She was acclaimed for her roles as Gavina in Aleksandr Mitta's series "Border. Taiga Romance" (2001) and Vicky (Vika) in Aleksei Sidorov's Shadowboxing (2005). In 2010, she starred in Anton Megerdichev's fantasy thriller Dark World alongside Svetlana Ivanova and Ivan Zhidkov.

== Filmography ==
- 1997 – Christmas Story
- 1999 – Beresina, or the Last Days of Switzerland – Irina
- 1999 – Mother – Pauline in her youth
- 2001 – Border. Taiga Romance (TV series) – Galina tow
- 2002 – Kamenskaya: Za vse nado platit – Olga Reshin
- 2002 – Red Sky. Black Snow – Lida (evacuee girl with child)
- 2003 – Land- Dasha Klyueva
- 2003 – Christ Under the Birches – Tanya
- 2004 – Shadowboxing - Vika
- 2004 – MOORE is MOORE (TV series) – Lida
- 2005 – Swan's Paradise – Lida, mayor
- 2006 – Bewitched Site – Dasha Klyueva
- 2006 – Hunter – Irene, journalist
- 2006 – The Husband Comes Back from a Business Trip - Katya Zagorskaya
- 2006 – Women's Work with a Hazard to Life, Investigator Nadezhda Postnikova
- 2006 – Secret Guardian – "Cobra", FSB
- 2007 – Shadowboxing 2: Revenge – Vika
- 2007 – Detective Putilin – Strekalova
- 2007 – Year of the Golden Fish – Masha
- 2007 – I'm Counting: One, Two, Three, Four, Five... , as Alisa
- 2008 – Friend or Foe – Olga
- 2008 – Time of Sins – Zina
- 2008 – Surprise (Russia, Ukraine) – Zoe, the former wife of Ivan
- 2009 – Prodigal Children (Russia, Ukraine)
- 2009 – House on the Lake District
- 2009 – Secret Guard. Deadly Game – "Cobra"
- 2009 – I Am Not Myself, as Lena Fufachyova
- 2009 – Dark World – Helvi
- 2010 – Dr. Tyrsa
- 2010 – Mother for Rent – Tamara
- 2010 – Fine Line (TV series), – Marina Sinitsyn
- 2011 – Shadowboxing 3: The Final Round – Vika
- 2012 – Time to love – Svetlana
- 2013 – Metro – Galya
- 2013 – Fierce – Barysheva
- 2014 – The Fool – Kristina
- 2017 – The Age of Pioneers – Tatiana Belyayeva
- 2022 – Land of Legends – Tabarga

== Awards ==
In 2001, Panova was awarded the State Prize of the Russian Federation
