= Andrei Panin =

Russian actor and director

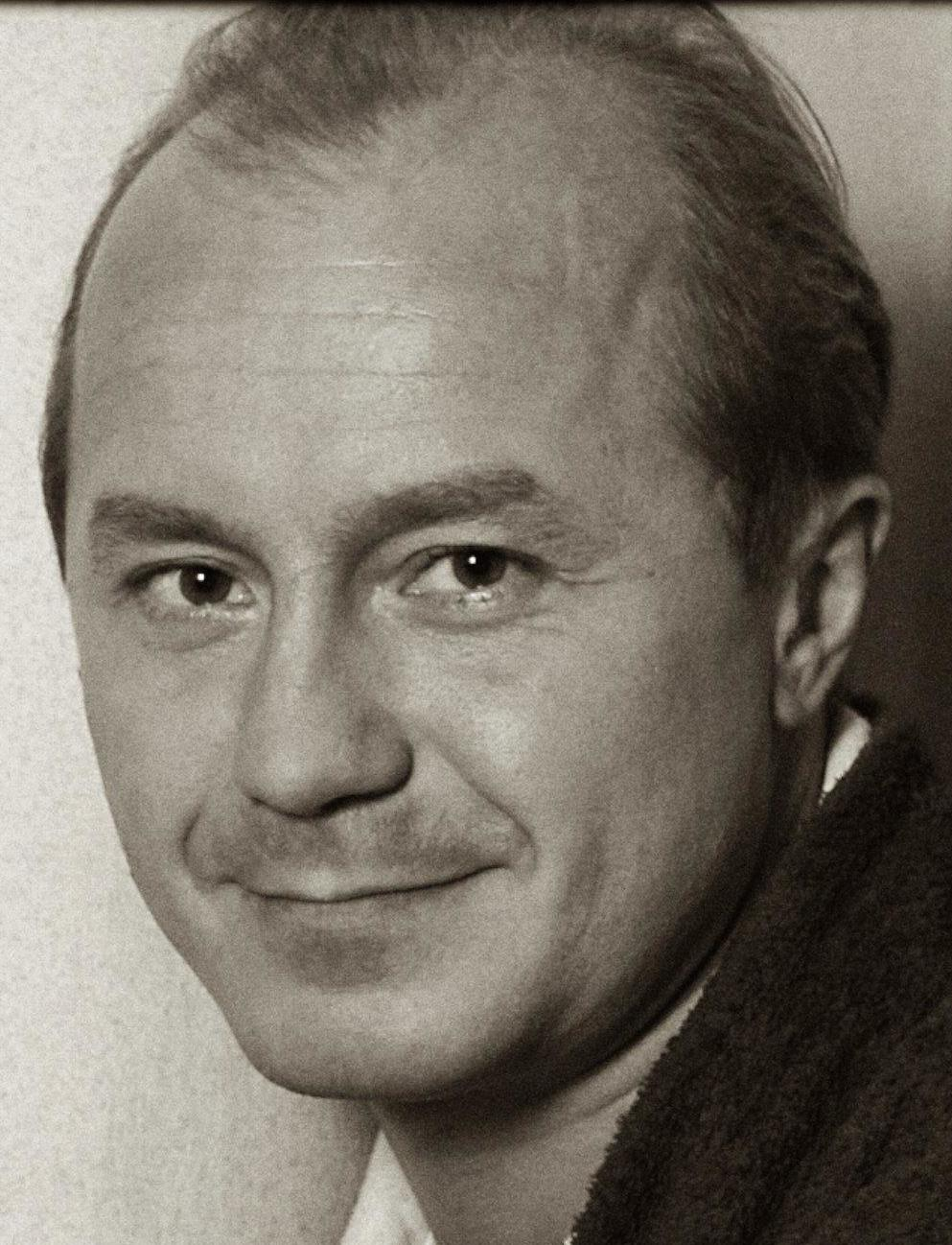
- Born: Andrei Vladimirovich Panin; 28 May 1962; Novosibirsk, Russian SFSR, Soviet Union
- Died: 6 March 2013 (aged 50); Moscow, Russian Federation
- Resting place: Troyekurovskoye Cemetery, Moscow
- Spouse: Natalya Rogozhkina
- Children: 2

Andrei Vladimirovich Panin (Russian: Андре́й Влади́мирович Па́нин; 28 May 1962 – 6 March 2013) was a Nika Award-winner Russian actor appearing in film and television, and a director.

== Biography ==
=== Early life ===
Panin was born on 28 May 1962, in Novosibirsk, Russian SFSR, Soviet Union, the son of Agnessa (née Berezovskaya), and Dimitry Alexandrovich Panin. Two years later, the family moved to Chelyabinsk, then, when Panin was six years old, to Kemerovo, where he lived for 16 years.

=== Acting career ===
Panin was well known for the hit television detective show Kamenskaya. In 2000, he had lead roles in both Valery Akhadov's Don't Offend the Women and Pavel Lungin's The Wedding, as well as Alexander Atanesyan's action thriller 24 Hours. He won the best actor prize at the Golden Ram film festival for his part in The Wedding. Panin made his first screen appearance in the movie Straightway, but it was his performances in Maxim Pezhemsky's Mama, Don't Cry and Denis Yevstigneev's Mama that brought the actor renown.

Before becoming a screen regular, he was a stage actor at the Minusinsky theater, where he worked after graduating from the Culture Institute in Kemerovo. Although he had initially planned to attend the Culinary Institute, Panin went on to further his education as an actor, graduating from Moscow's legendary MKhAT in 1991 and taking up residence at the MKhAT Chekhov theater with his wife, Natalya Rogozhina. His stage work includes Three Sisters (Soleny), The Miserly Knight, Marriage, Deadly Number, and a private production of Winter. Panin often acted in Oleg Tabakov's productions.

=== Personal life ===
Panin lived in Moscow, Russia with his wife, Natalya Rogozhkina. He was found dead in his apartment on 7 March 2013, lying on the floor with a head wound.

== Selected filmography ==
- 1998 — Mama Don't Cry (Мама, не горюй) as sailor
- 1998 — Day of the Full Moon as captain
- 1999 / 2011 — Kamenskaya (Каменская) as Stasov
- 2000 — The Wedding (Свадьба) as Garkusha
- 2001 — Poisons or the World History of Poisoning (Яды, или Всемирная история отравлений) as Cesare Borgia
- 2002 — Spartacus and Kalashnikov (Спартак и Калашников)
- 2003 — The Suit (Шик) as Botya
- 2002 — The Brigade: Law of Lawless (Бригада) as Vladimir Kaverin
- 2005 — Dead Man's Bluff (Жмурки) as architect
- 2005 — Mama Don't Cry 2 (Мама, не горюй-2) as sailor
- 2005 — Shadowboxing (Бой с тенью) as Valiyev
- 2007 — Shadowboxing 2: Revenge (Бой с тенью 2: Реванш) as Valiyev
- 2007 — Vanechka (Ванечка)
- 2007 — Crime and Punishment (Преступление и наказание) as Porfiriy Petrovich
- 2007 — Gagarin's Grandson (also Director) as Tolyan Titov
- 2010 — Kandagar (Кандагар) as Alexander Gotov
- 2010 — Burnt by the Sun 2 (Утомлённые солнцем 2) as Kravets
- 2011 — Generation P (Generation P) as Kolya
- 2011 — Shadowboxing 3: Last Round (Бой с тенью 3D: Последний раунд) as Valiyev
- 2011 — Vysotsky. Thank You For Being Alive (Высоцкий. Спасибо, что живой) as Dr. Anatoly Nefedov
- 2012 — Breakaway (Отрыв) as Igor Grumel
- 2012 — Redemption (Искупление) as Fedor
- 2012 — The Horde (Орда) as khan Tini Beg
- 2013 — Sherlock Holmes (Шерлок Холмс) as Dr. Watson
- 2014 — Hetaera of Major Sokolov (Гетеры майора Соколова) as Andrei Sokolov
