= List of Russian films of 2002 =

A list of films produced in Russia in 2002 (see 2002 in film).

== 2002 ==
Title	Russian title	Director	Cast	Genre	Notes
Antikiller	Антикиллер	Egor Konchalovsky	Gosha Kutsenko, Mikhail Ulyanov	Crime	
Azazel	Азазель	Aleksandr Adabashyan	Ilya Noskov, Kirill Pirogov, Sergey Bezrukov	Crime	
Bear's Kiss	Медвежий поцелуй	Sergei Bodrov	Rebecka Liljeberg, Sergei Bodrov Jr., Joachim Król	Drama	
Brigada	Бригада	Aleksei Sidorov	Sergey Bezrukov, Dmitri Dyuzhev, Vladimir Vdovichenkov	Crime	
Cinderella	Золушка	Semyon Gorov	Yulia Mavrina, Nikolay Baskov, Valery Leontiev, Valery Meladze	Musical	
Chekhov's Motifs	Чеховские мотивы	Kira Muratova	Sergey Bekhterev, Nina Ruslanova	Comedy	Entered into the 24th Moscow International Film Festival
Cuckoo	Кукушка	Aleksandr Rogozhkin	Anni-Kristiina Juuso, Ville Haapasalo, Viktor Bychkov	War	
House of Fools	Дом дураков	Andrei Konchalovsky	Julia Visotskaya, Sultan Islamov, Yevgeni Mironov	War	
The Kopeck	Копейка	Ivan Dykhovichny	Sergey Mazaev, Andrey Krasko	Comedy	
The Lover	Любовник	Valery Todorovsky	Oleg Yankovsky, Sergey Garmash	Drama	
In Motion	В движении	Filipp Yankovsky	Konstantin Khabensky, Elena Perova, Oksana Fandera	Drama	
Railway Romance	Железнодорожный романс	Ivan Solovov	Egor Beroev, Olga Budina	Drama	
Russian Ark	Русский ковчег	Alexander Sokurov	Sergei Dreiden	History	Entered into the 2002 Cannes Film Festival
Spartacus and Kalashnikov	Спартак и Калашников	Andrey Proshkin	Ignat Akrachkov, Pavel Astakhov	Drama	
The Star	Звезда	Nikolai Lebedev	Igor Petrenko	War	
Theatrical Novel	Театральный роман	Oleg Babitsky, Yury Goldin	Comedy		
Turning	Превращение	Valery Fokin	Yevgeny Mironov, Igor Kvasha	Drama	
Tycoon	Олигарх	Pavel Lungin	Vladimir Mashkov		
Stereoblood	Одиночество крови	Roman Prygunov	Ingeborga Dapkunaite, Gosha Kutsenko	Thriller	Entered into the 24th Moscow International Film Festival
War	Война	Aleksei Balabanov	Ian Kelly, Aleksey Chadov	War	

== See also ==
- 2002 in Russia
