= Sentimental Journey =

Sentimental Journey may refer to:

== Music ==
- "Sentimental Journey" (song), 1945 song by the Les Brown orchestra sung by Doris Day
- Doris Day's Sentimental Journey, a 1965 album by Doris Day
- Sentimental Journey (Rosemary Clooney album), 2001
- Sentimental Journey (Lou Donaldson album), 1995
- Sentimental Journey (Houston Person album), 2002
- Sentimental Journey (Emmy Rossum album), 2013
- Sentimental Journey (Ringo Starr album), 1970
- Sentimental Journey: Pop Vocal Classics, a four-volume compact disc collection of late 1940s to early 1950s popular hits, issued in 1993
- "Sentimental Journey", a song by Iyo Matsumoto, 1981
- "Sentimental Journey", a song by Pere Ubu from their 1978 album The Modern Dance

== Film and television ==
- Sentimental Journey (film), a 1946 motion picture starring Maureen O'Hara
- "A Sentimental Journey" (Randall and Hopkirk), a 1970 episode of the TV series Randall and Hopkirk (Deceased)
- Sentimental Journey (anime), a 1998 anime based on the Sentimental Graffiti video game
- Sentimental Journey to the Potatoes, a 1986 Soviet romance film

== Literature ==
- A Sentimental Journey Through France and Italy, a novel by Laurence Sterne
- Sentimental Journey (book), a photo-book by Nobuyoshi Araki
- A Sentimental Journey: Memoirs, 1917–1922, an autobiographical work by Viktor Shklovsky
- The Sentimental Journey to Mount Etna by Osip Senkovsky
- Lahore: A Sentimental Journey

== Other ==
- Sentimental Journey (aircraft), a B-17 Flying Fortress bomber aircraft
