= Mavrin =

Mavrin (Russian: Маврин) is a Russian masculine surname, its feminine counterpart is Mavrina. It may refer to:

- Sergey Mavrin (born 1963), Russian heavy metal musician
- Sergey Mavrin (judge) (1951–2025), Russian judge
- Yulia Mavrina (born 1984), Russian theater, film and television actress
