= Traditional pop =

Western popular music, before mid-1950s

- Other names: Classic pop
- Stylistic origins: Broadway theatre; Tin Pan Alley; folk music; swing; show tunes
- Cultural origins: 1920s–1930s, United States
- Typical instruments: Strings; guitar; piano; vocals
- Derivative forms: Pop

Regional scenes
- Japan; Indonesia; Malaysia

Traditional pop (also known as pre–rock and roll pop) is a style of Western popular music that generally predates the advent of rock and roll and pop music in the mid-1950s. The most popular and enduring songs from this era of music are known as pop standards or American standards. The works of these songwriters and composers are usually considered part of the canon known as the "Great American Songbook". More generally, the term "standard" can be applied to any popular song that has become very widely known within mainstream culture and recorded by many artists.

AllMusic defines traditional pop as "post–big band and pre–rock & roll pop music".

== Origins ==
Traditional pop includes the song output of the Broadway, Tin Pan Alley, and Hollywood show tune writers from approximately World War I to the 1950s, such as Irving Berlin, Frederick Loewe, Victor Herbert, Harry Warren, Harold Arlen, Jerome Kern, George Gershwin and Ira Gershwin, Richard Rodgers and Lorenz Hart, Oscar Hammerstein, Johnny Mercer, Dorothy Fields, Hoagy Carmichael, and Cole Porter.

== Mid-1940s to mid-1950s: height of popularity ==
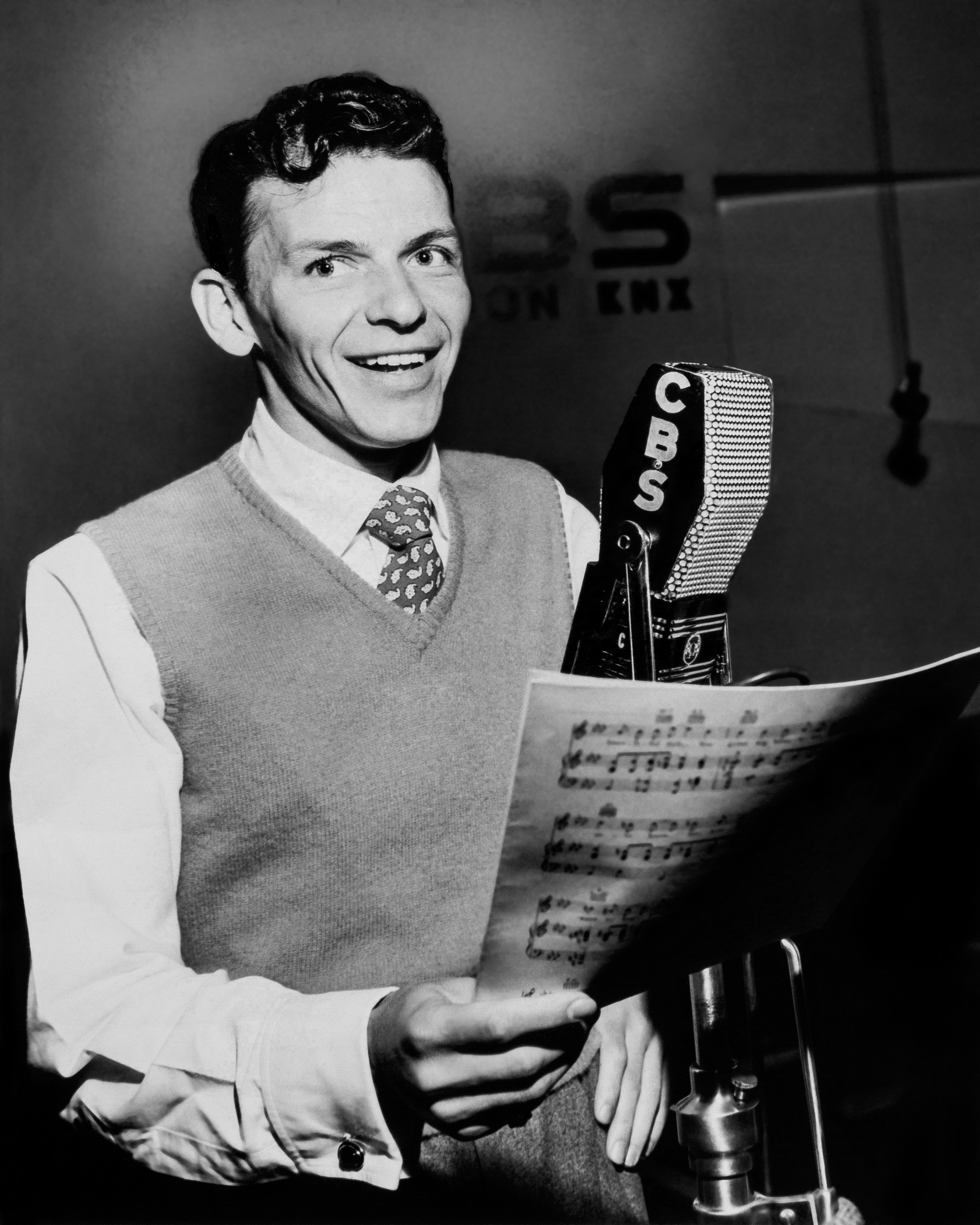
Frank Sinatra at CBS Radio in 1944

The swing era made stars of many popular singers including the young Frank Sinatra, Dinah Shore, Jo Stafford, Perry Como, Peggy Lee, Patti Page, David Whitfield, and Bing Crosby. Two notable innovations were the addition of string sections and orchestral arrangements and more emphasis on the vocal performance. The addition of lush strings can be heard in much of the popular music throughout the 1940s and 1950s.

== Late 1950s to 1960s: decline ==
In the late 1950s, rock became a popular and prominent musical style. However, some pop singers who had been popular during the swing era or traditional pop music period were still big stars such as Frank Sinatra, Doris Day, Ella Fitzgerald, Dinah Shore, Dean Martin, and Bing Crosby.

Some of these vocalists faded with traditional pop music, while many vocalists became involved in 1960s vocal jazz and the rebirth of "swing music"; the swing music of the 1960s is sometimes referred to as easy listening and was, in essence, a revival of popularity of the "sweet" bands that had been popular during the swing era, but with more emphasis on the vocalist. Like the swing era, it too featured many songs of the Great American Songbook. Much of this music was made popular by Nelson Riddle and television-friendly singers like Rosemary Clooney, Dean Martin, and the cast of Your Hit Parade.

Many artists made their mark with pop standards, particularly entertainer, vocal jazz and pop singers such as Bing Crosby, Frank Sinatra, Tony Bennett, Doris Day, Dean Martin, Sammy Davis Jr., Louis Armstrong, Nat King Cole (originally known as a jazz pianist), Lena Horne, Vic Damone, Johnny Mathis, Bobby Darin, Ella Fitzgerald, Carmen McRae, Barbra Streisand, Peggy Lee, Sarah Vaughan, Dinah Washington, Andy Williams, Frankie Laine, Nancy Wilson, Rita Reys, Liza Minnelli and Cleo Laine.

The diverging tastes between the baby boomers and older Americans of the 1960s led to one of the earliest schisms in music radio. Whereas rock dominated contemporary hit radio (top 40), traditional pop formed the basis of middle of the road (MOR). In terms of 21st century radio formats, the top-40 hits of the 1950s and 1960s are played on oldies stations while the traditional pop hits are the province of adult standards (with some exceptions); due to aging demographics, both formats are fading in popularity in favor of classic hits and gold-based adult contemporary, respectively.

== Advent of rock and roll ==
With the growing popularity of rock and roll in the 1950s, much of what baby boomers considered to be their parents' music, traditional pop, was pushed aside. Popular music sung by such performers as Frank Sinatra, Dean Martin, Ella Fitzgerald, Peggy Lee and their contemporaries was relegated in the 1960s and 1970s to television, where they remained very popular, and to Las Vegas club acts and elevator music. Dean Martin and Frank Sinatra continued to have many hit singles and albums until the late 1960s, however. Nashville country music borrowed heavily from traditional pop sounds in the late 1950s as Music Row sought to limit the growing influence of rock and roll on the genre; it remained popular until both the British Invasion, the deaths of two of Nashville's biggest country stars (Patsy Cline and Jim Reeves) in separate airplane crashes, and the growing influence of West Coast country music pushed it aside beginning in 1964.

In 1983, Linda Ronstadt, a popular female vocalist of the rock era, elected to change direction. She collaborated with legendary arranger-conductor Nelson Riddle and released a successful album of standards from the 1940s and 1950s, What's New. It reached No. 3 on the Billboard pop chart, won a Grammy, and inspired Ronstadt to team up with Riddle for two more albums: 1984's Lush Life and 1986's For Sentimental Reasons. The gamble paid off, as all three albums became hits, the international concert tours were a success and Riddle picked up a few more Grammys in the process. Ronstadt's determination to produce these albums exposed a new generation to the sounds of the pre-swing and swing eras.

Since then, other rock/pop stars have occasionally found success recording traditional pop music. Notable albums include Rod Stewart's It Had to Be You: The Great American Songbook, Willie Nelson's Stardust, Chaka Khan's Echoes of an Era and Carly Simon's Torch.

== See also ==
- Adult contemporary
- Grammy Award for Best Traditional Pop Vocal Album
- Great American Songbook
- Jazz standard
- List of blues standards
- Oldies
- Pop music
- Pops orchestra
- Schlager music
- Sentimental ballad
- Sentimental Journey: Pop Vocal Classics (four-CD album)
- Show tune
- Standard (music)
- Tin Pan Alley
