= Yura Was Here =

- Directed by: Sergey Malkin
- Written by: Yuliana Koshkina; Sergey Malkin
- Produced by: Sergey Bredyuk; Rita Streltsova; Artyom Turdakov; Ivan Yakovenko; Sergei Yershov
- Starring: Konstantin Khabensky; Denis Paramonov; Kuzma Kotrylyov; Aleksandr Porshin; Vasily Mikhaylov; Dasha Kotrelyova; Yuliya Cherepnina; Yelena Moiseyeva
- Cinematography: Filipp Zadorozhnyi
- Edited by: Anastasiya Marchukova
- Music by: Aleksandr Demyanov
- Release dates: October 2025 (Mayak); February 5, 2026 (Russia)
- Country: Russia
- Language: Russian

Yura Was Here (Russian: Здесь был Юра) is a 2025 Russian comedy drama film directed by Sergey Malkin. It stars Konstantin Khabensky. This film was theatrically released on February 5, 2026.

== Plot ==
The film tells the story of a group of young people living in a Moscow apartment and looking after their mentally disabled uncle.

== Cast ==
- Konstantin Khabensky as Yura
- Denis Paramonov as Oleg
- Kuzma Kotrylyov as Seryoga
- Aleksandr Porshin as Cheba
- Vasily Mikhaylov as Andrey
- Dasha Kotrelyova as Ksyukha
- Yuliya Cherepnina as Nana
- Yelena Moiseyeva as Marina

== Production ==
Filming took place in Moscow.
