= Daniil Spivakovsky =

Russian film and theater actor

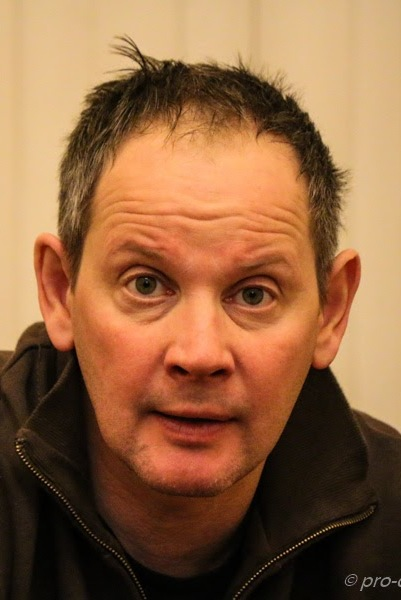
- Daniil Spivakovsky in 2015
- Born: Daniil Ivanovich Spivakovsky; August 28, 1969 (age 57); Moscow, USSR
- Occupation: Actor
- Years active: 1990–present

Daniil Ivanovich Spivakovsky (Russian: Даниил Иванович Спиваковский; August 28, 1969, Moscow) is a Russian film and theater actor, Honored Artist of Russia (2007). Head of the workshop of Theatre faculty of the Moscow Institute of Television and Radio Broadcasting Ostankino.

== Biography ==
Daniil Spivakovsky born into a family doctor of psychological sciences, professor of Moscow State University Alla Semyonovna Spivakovskaya (born 1947).

After high school in 1986, Daniil filed documents in the Moscow State University in the Department of Psychology, however, did not get one point in the first year could not do, he went to work as an orderly in a mental hospital. He enrolled in the following year, but then canceled the benefits for full-time students and first-year Spivakovsky drafted into the Soviet army.

He served two years in the Army Signal Corps in 1989, Daniel was restored at the institute. However, he has not forgotten his love of theater and friends went to the Student Theater of Moscow State University.

Spring for the company, he went with friends to enter the college theater. It turned out that it took just three theatrical high school, but he chose to study GITIS. Teachers Spivakovsky was Andrey Goncharov.

In the cinema since 1991. Since 1992, the actor works in the Mayakovsky Theatre.

He appeared in the sixth season of ice show contest Ice Age.

== Personal life ==
- First wife — actress Anna Ardova.
- Second wife — Svetlana Spivakovskaya. Three children.

== Creativity ==
=== Theatre ===
- 1990 — Rosencrantz and Guildenstern are dead by Tom Stoppard as Hamlet
- 1991 — Adventures of Buratino by Aleksey Tolstoy and Bulat Okudzhava as Duremar
- 1994 — Victim Century by Alexander Ostrovsky as footman, senior footman
- 1994 — It's a Family Affair-We'll Settle It Ourselves by Alexander Ostrovsky as Tishka
- 2012 — Talents and Admirers by Alexander Ostrovsky as Meluzov

=== Filmography ===
- 1991 — Migrants as episode
- 2001 — Maroseyka 12 as engineer Lyova Beregovoy
- 2002 — Two Fates as Mark
- 2004 — My stepbrother Frankenstein as Pavel
- 2005 — Poor Relatives as Grisha Tsausaki
- 2005 — The Case of Dead Souls as Pyotr Bobchinsky (TV)
- 2005 — Yesenin as Vetlugin
- 2007 — 1612 as Styopka-Podkova
- 2008 — My Husband — Genius as Lev Landau (Award of the Academy of Russian Television TEFI — for Best Actor)
- 2008 — Silver Samurai as Emperor Peter III of Russia
- 2008 — The Inhabited Island as broadcaster
- 2009 — The Legend of Olga as Adolf Hitler
- 2010 — Tower as owner Goldanskii
- 2010 — Burnt by the Sun 2 as commander of the crossing
- 2011 — Comrade Stalin as Mikhail Suslov
- 2011 — The PyraMMMid as Gutov
- 2015 — Jurisdiction as Bushkov
- 2016 — The Men and Women as Vozvyshaev
- 2021 — The Execution as Miron
