= Marat Basharov =

Russian actor

- Марат Башаров; Марат Бәшәров
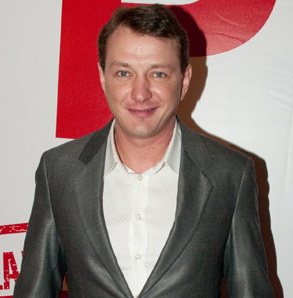
- Basharov at the film's premiere in 2011
- Born: Marat Alimzhanovich Basharov; 22 August 1974 (age 51); Moscow, RSFSR, USSR
- Citizenship: Soviet Union; Russia
- Occupations: Actor; television actor
- Years active: 1994-present
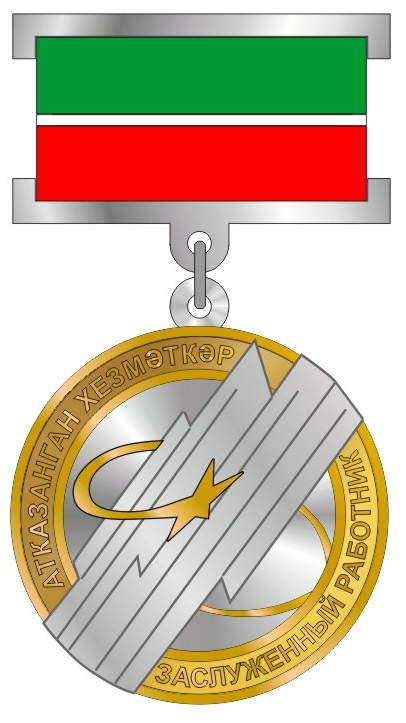
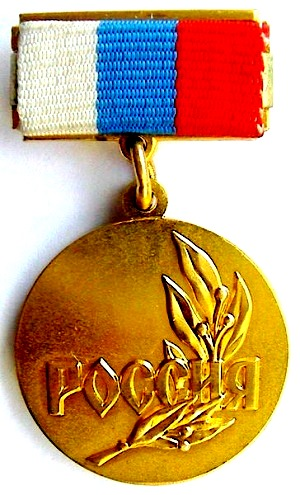
- Awards

Marat Alimzhanovich Basharov (Russian: Марат Алимжанович Башаров, Tatar: Марат Галимҗан улы Бәшәров, born 22 August 1974) is a Soviet and Russian film actor and a TV host, of Volga Tatar origin. He is an Honored Artist of the Republic of Tatarstan (2012), laureate of the State Prize of the Russian Federation (2002).

He has appeared in 30 films since 1994. He starred in the film The Wedding, which was entered into the 2000 Cannes Film Festival. He appeared in the ninth season of ice show contest Ice Age.

== Biography ==
Marat Basharov was born in Moscow to a working class Volga Tatar family. His ancestors came from Mishar villages in Krasnooktyabrsky District, Nizhny Novgorod Oblast. After high school, Basharov was enrolled in Moscow State University, Faculty of Law. However, pursuing an acting career, he soon dropped out and went to the M.S. Schepkin Higher Theatre School instead.

Marat has a daughter (born Sep 2004) named Ameli. In October 2014, Basharov beat his second wife, Katherine Arkharova, and kicked her out of the apartment. Arkharova spent some time in a coma. Doctors diagnosed her with a nose fracture, traumatic brain injury and bruising. Later, the actress was discharged from the hospital and moved out. The couple divorced in 2015. In 2017, the actor married his fan, Elizaveta Shevyrkova. Their son was born in 2016. On 27 December 2018, Shevyrkova was hospitalized with a nose injury that, as she reported, resulted from family abuse. The woman spoke about repeated battery by her husband and filed for divorce.

=== Sanctions ===
In February 2023, Canada sanctioned Marat Basharov for being involved in Russian propaganda and spreading misinformation relating to the Russian invasion of Ukraine.

== Selected filmography ==
- Burnt by the Sun (1994), as the tank crewman
- The Barber of Siberia (1998), as Cadet Polievskyy
- Voroshilov Sharpshooter (1999), as Igor Zvorygin
- The Wedding (2000), as Misha Krapivin
- Still Waters (2000), as the traffic cop
- Tycoon (2002), as Koshkin
- 72 Meters (2004), as Captain-Lieutenant Pyotr Orlov
- The Fall of the Empire (2005), as lieutenant counterintelligence Ivan Karlovich Stolz
- The Turkish Gambit (2005), as warrant officer Dmitry Gridnev
- Playing the Victim (2006), as Karas'
- Tins (2007), as Igor Davydov
- 1612 (2007), as Ivan Nikitich, the voivode of Navolok
- Election Day (2007), cameo
- Terra Nova (2008), as Tolya
- Attack on Leningrad (2009), as Yura Krasko
- In the Style of Jazz (2010), as the actor
- Office Romance. Our Time (2011), as Yuri Samokhvalov
- Rzhevsky versus Napoleon (2012), as Pyotr Bagration
- Battalion (2015), as Alexander Kerensky
- The Heritage of Love (2016), as Baron Ivan Karlovich von Liven
- Going Vertical (2017), as Gennadii Tereshenko
- The Master and Margarita (2024), as Stepan Likhodeyev
