= White Tights =

Urban legend about female snipers fighting against Russian forces

White Tights, White Pantyhose or White Stockings (Russian: белые колготки, beliye kolgotki; Lithuanian: baltosios pėdkelnės; Latvian: baltās zeķbikses; Estonian: valged sukkpüksid) is a Russian urban legend about female sniper mercenaries fighting against Russian forces in various armed conflicts from the late 1980s. The legend describes these women as blond Amazon-like nationalistic biathletes turned anti-Russian mercenaries. They come predominantly from the Baltic states, but subsequent variations of the legend have diversified the ethnic composition of the snipers, including Ukrainian and Russian women in their midst. The name "White Tights" originates from the white-coloured winter sports attire these snipers were wearing and was coined during the First Nagorno-Karabakh War.

== Origins ==
The phenomenon was first reported during the late 1980s, with female Baltic irregulars being rumoured fighting with the resistance in the Soviet–Afghan War. There also were legends of them participating in the Transnistria War, but Russian author Yulia Shum argues that there is no evidence for this and that these rumors appeared as a product of a propaganda campaign.

It appeared first in the English-language media only in conjunction with the post-Soviet First and Second Chechen Wars. Attempts have been made to link the alleged presence of the "White Tights" in the Chechen Republic of Ichkeria, not only with the special forces and intelligence services of the Baltic states, but also to the positive relations Chechen leader Dzhokhar Dudayev enjoyed with both the Government of Estonia and Lithuanian politician Vytautas Landsbergis. Sergey Yastrzhembsky, the Kremlin Press Secretary during the early phase of the Second Chechen War, argued that female Baltic snipers actually existed based on evidence from GRU military intelligence, who "don't make mistakes". The Government of Estonia has asked for the evidence behind the claims and sent diplomatic notes twice to Russia without receiving an official answer.

== Later conflicts ==
=== Russo-Georgian War ===
In November 2008, Alexander Bastrykin, head of the Russian Prosecutor General's Investigative Committee, has suggested that mercenaries from the Baltic states were among those known to have participated on the Georgian side during the Russo-Georgian War, including a female sniper from Latvia. There were reports of snipers from other countries; these reports resurrected the rumours of "White Tights" operating in the Caucasus. A spokesman for the Latvian Ministry of Defence, Airis Rikveilis, rebutted Bastrykin's statements as follows: "We had thought that the ghost of the 'White Tights' had died in the Russian press, but now we see that it still roams Russia."

=== Russo-Ukrainian War ===
On 2 May 2014, Sergey Golyandin, a correspondent of the Russian news outlet LifeNews in Ukraine, reported unconfirmed information about Baltic women snipers in action against pro-Russian forces during the siege of Sloviansk:

One minute ago APCs arrived and cannon fired at the BZS checkpoint, situated between Kharkiv and Rostov. Self-defense forces had to be moved out of there. The commander of the checkpoint arrived and said that besides the APCs firing they were also shot by snipers and from what he heard the snipers were women who spoke in some Baltic language. Currently the information has not been verified, these are only words of the BZS checkpoint commander.

== In popular culture ==
White Tights have also appeared in the Russian popular media, such as in Alexander Nevzorov's 1997 film Purgatory. In the film, two Lithuanian "biathletes" are portrayed as sadistic mercenary snipers fighting for the Chechen rebels. A much more sympathetic character of a Lithuanian female sniper appeared in Andrei Konchalovsky's 2002 film House of Fools, portrayed by Cecilie Thomsen.

== See also ==
- Ghost of Kyiv – Mythical Ukrainian flying ace arising from the Kyiv offensive (2022)
- Colonel Tomb – Mythical North Vietnamese flying ace representing the Vietnam People's Air Force, and claimed killed by the Americans
- Lei Feng – Chinese soldier (1940–1962)
- Lone gunner of Flesquières – Possibly mythical German officer in 1917
