= Poor Relatives =

- DVD cover with Russian title: Бедные родственники
- Bednye Rodstvenniki
- Directed by: Pavel Lungin
- Written by: Gennady Ostrovsky
- Produced by: Catherine Dussart; Pavel Lungin; Olga Vasilyeva
- Starring: Konstantin Khabensky; Sergei Garmash; Marina Golub; Daniil Spivakovsky; Grégoire Leprince-Ringuet; Leonid Kanevsky
- Cinematography: Mikhail Krichman
- Edited by: Sophie Brunet
- Music by: Michelle Arbatts; Roche Ave; Yuval Misenmasher
- Distributed by: Catherine Dussart Productions (CDP); Onix; Arte France Cinéma
- Release date: 2005
- Running time: 103 minutes
- Countries: Russia; France
- Language: Russian

Poor Relatives (Russian: Бедные родственники, romanized: Bednye Rodstvenniki), also released as Roots, is a 2005 Russian black comedy film directed by Pavel Lungin.

The film tells the story of a Russian grifter who defrauds foreigners by introducing them to ordinary people hired to pose as long lost relatives.

== Plot ==
A young con artist with a rather nice personality, Edik (Konstantin Khabensky) gets in trouble gathering long-lost foreign relatives together. Wealthy and middle-class émigrés who have made it in the new lands (the Americas, Israel) return to the homeland, to the roots from which they were severed. The implicit motivation for their return is the search for spiritual nourishment, and so the émigrés sacrifice the material comforts of their villas and Western civilization to journey to their ancestral past, the timeless village of Golotvin. They believe that here they will be able to complete themselves by reconnecting with their heritage. All for the nominal fee of Edik, a free agent and a small-time crook who orchestrates an elaborate crime with the intention of earning a pile of money by tricking a group of pilgrims into thinking that a small village is their homeland and its inhabitants are their long-lost relatives. The levels of deception multiply quickly...

== Cast ==
- Konstantin Khabensky as Edik
- Leonid Kanevsky as Baroukh
- Sergei Garmash as Yacha
- Natalya Kolyakanova as Regina
- Esther Gorintin as Esther
- Otto Tausig as Samuel
- Miglen Mirtchev as Andrew
- Grégoire Leprince-Ringuet as Marc-Yves

== Awards ==
=== Kinotavr (2005) ===
- Main Prize
- Best Male Actor (Konstantin Khabensky)
- Best Script (Gennady Ostrovsky)
- Prize of the Governor of Kuban

=== White Elephant (2005) ===
- Best Male Supporting Actor (Sergei Garmash)

=== Golden Aries (2006) ===
- Best Male Actor in the Popular Vote (Konstantin Khabensky)
