= The Case of "Dead Souls" =

- Genre: Fantasy
- Written by: Yuri Arabov; Nikolai Gogol
- Directed by: Pavel Lungin
- Starring: Pavel Derevyanko; Konstantin Khabensky; Sergei Garmash
- Country of origin: Russia
- Original language: Russian
- No. of series: 1
- No. of episodes: 8

Production
- Producers: Pavel Lungin; Olga Vasilieva; Arkady Tsimbler
- Cinematography: Sergei Astakhov
- Production company: Pavel Lungin Studio

Original release
- Network: NTV

The Case of "Dead Souls" (Russian: Дело о «Мёртвых душах», romanized: Delo o «Myortvykh dushakh») is a 2005 Russian television miniseries directed by Pavel Lungin loosely based on various stories by Nikolai Gogol, including Dead Souls.

== Plot ==
The collegiate registrar Ivan Shiller (Pavel Derevyanko) is sent to the provincial city of N to investigate the disappearance of fraudster Pavel Ivanovich Chichikov (Konstantin Khabensky) from prison. He is obstructed by city officials who are led by Governor A.A. Skvoznik-Dmukhanovsky (Sergei Garmash). After going through the investigation through a series of meetings of strange encounters, Schiller himself turns into Chichikov in the finale...

== Cast ==
- Pavel Derevyanko - Ivan Afanasievich Shiller
- Konstantin Khabensky - Pavel Ivanovich Chichikov / tailor
- Sergei Garmash - Anton Antonovich Skvoznik-Dmukhanovsky, Governor
- Nina Usatova - Anna Andreevna, wife of the governor
- Sergei Kolesnikov - bailiff Christian Stepanovich Derzhimorda
- Alexander Abdulov - Nozdryov
- Victor Abrosimov - Prosecutor
- Viktor Verzhbitsky - Leonty Vasilievich Dubbel
- Vladimir Simonov - Alexander von Benckendorff
- Roman Madyanov - Postmaster Ivan Kuzmich Shpekin
- Alexander Semchev - Sobakevich
- Leonid Yarmolnik - Plyushkin
- Anna Ardova - Marfa Semyonovna, housekeeper
- Andrei Bronnikov - Father Foma
- Elena Galibina - Nastasya Petrovna Korobochka
- Alexander Ilyin - Judge Ammos Fedorovich Lyapkin-Tyapkin
- Maxim Konovalov - Gregory, servant
- Yuri Nifontov - Artemy Filippovich Zemlyannika, trustee of god-friendly institutions
- Inga Strelkova-Oboldina - Marya Antonovna, daughter of the governor
- Galina Petrova - Pulcheria Ivanovna
- Vladimir Salnikov - Afanasy Ivanovich
- Sergey Serov - Ivan Lazarevich Svistunov
- Peter Soldatov - Captain Kopeikin
- Daniil Spivakovsky - Pyotr Ivanovich Bobchinsky
- Ivan Agapov - Pyotr Ivanovich Dobchinsky
- Mikhail Tserishenko - owner of the hotel
- Yevgenia Dmitrieva - Lizanka, the wife of Manilov
- Pavel Lyubimtsev - Manilov
- Maria Sokova - Feodulia Ivanovna, wife of Sobakevich
- Andrey Batukhanov - archivist
- Daria Belousova - street girl
- Sergey Epishev - sergeant / sentry
- Olga Lapshina - Shpekin's wife
- Dmitry Prokofiev - Stepan
- Tatiana Yakovenko - Lizaveta
- Roman Hardykov - judicial official
