= Collector (2016 film) =

- Theatrical release poster
- Directed by: Alexey Krasovsky
- Written by: Alexey Krasovsky
- Produced by: Eduard Eloyan; Dmitry Ruzhentsev; Georgiy Shabanov
- Starring: Konstantin Khabensky
- Cinematography: Denis Firstov
- Edited by: Artyom Baryshnikov
- Music by: Dmitry Selipanov
- Production company: Paprika Production
- Distributed by: All Media Company
- Release date: 9 June 2016 (Kinotavr)
- Running time: 74 minutes
- Country: Russia
- Language: Russian

Collector (Russian: Коллектор, romanized: Kollektor) is a 2016 Russian drama film written and directed by Alexey Krasovsky. The film stars Konstantin Khabensky in the title role, with Ksenia Buravskaya, Polina Agureeva, Darya Moroz, Valentina Lukaschuk, Yevgeny Stychkin, Kirill Pletnyov, Igor Zolotovitsky, Tatyana Lazareva, Alexander Tyutin, Marina Lisovets, Nikita Tyunin providing voices.

The film premiered at Kinotavr Film Festival in Sochi in June 2016. Collector received critical acclaim, particularly for Khabensky's performance.

== Plot ==
Arthur is the best employee of a collecting firm. He's got a high income and a solid reputation among his colleagues.

He risks losing it all at once because of a scandalous video involving him that just hit the web. In one instant he becomes the main target of journalists and gossip columnists. His colleagues and friends turn away from him. He provokes intense hatred within society and is being threatened. The video, that was fabricated to set him up, becomes the truth. The truth he is trying to tell is perceived as a lie.

Arthur is trapped inside his office. Alone against the world. But his main enemy, the author of the video, turns out to be a widow who is convinced that it was Arthur who drove her husband to suicide. She is going to do everything in her power to drive him off the deep end.

== Cast ==
- Konstantin Khabensky as Arthur
- Polina Agureeva as Tamara (voice)
- Ksenia Buravskaya as Natalya (voice)
- Tatyana Lazareva as Tatiana (voice)
- Marina Lisovets as Doctor (voice)
- Valentina Lukashchuk as Liza (voice)
- Kirill Pletnyov as Yevgeny (voice)
- Yevgeny Stychkin as Lev (voice)
- Nikita Tyunin as Yurlov (voice)
- Aleksandr Tyutin as Roman (voice)
- Igor Zolotovitsky as Journalist (voice)
- Darya Moroz as Ksenia (voice)

== Production ==
Konstantin Khabensky took a major pay cut to act in the film.

Director Alexei Krasovsky said that if Khabensky would have refused his role, he himself would have acted in the film instead.

Almost the entire film takes place within a room, where the main character is talking to phone. Shooting took place in real time for 8 days, and the filmmakers only took breaks to change the cameras' memory cards. Arthur is the only character shown on screen — others interact with him on the phone, their parts were also recorded in real time.

== Release ==
Collector was shown out of competition at the 27th Sochi International Film Festival named Kinotavr, and premiered in the Spotlight program in the 2016 Karlovy Vary International Film Festival.

It was released in cinemas on 6 October 2016 in the Russian Federation. On the 16th of April 2017 it was shown on the NTV channel.

== Reception ==
The film earned the approval of the overwhelming majority of Russian film critics. About the Collector was written: "The film, where the viewer does not observe the events on the screen, instead events of the human soul - the most difficult and the most valuable thing in any field of art" (Rossiyskaya Gazeta), "The creators of "Collector" managed to escape stereotypes and awaken a simple human interest to the hero, supported by cinematic suspense" (Kommersant), "Because of this Khabensky is the star of our cinema, he can hold the attention of the viewers for more than an hour purely with his charisma and voice" (Film.ru), "a brilliant solo performance with one of the best Russian actors of our time" (The Hollywood Reporter Russia).

It has been compared to the 2013 film Locke which starred Tom Hardy by international critics.

== Awards ==
Khabensky got the Best Actor award at the Kinotavr Film Festival for his performance. The film also won the Kinotavr prize for best cinematography. In July 2016, at Karlovy Vary International Film Festival the film won the FEDEORA Jury Award. At the Nika Awards, Alexei Krasovsky was named the Discovery of the Year. The film won three awards at the 2017 Prague Independent Film Festival – Gustav Meyrink Prize (Jury Prize), Best Director and Best Actor (Konstantin Khabensky).

== See also ==
- Phone Booth (film)
