= Lilianna Lungina =

Lilianna Zinovyevna Lungina (Russian: Лилиа́нна Зино́вьевна Лунгина́; 16 June 1920 Smolensk, Russia – 13 January 1998 Moscow, Russia ) was a Russian translator from French, German, Norwegian, Danish and Swedish languages. She translated into Russian:

- tales by Astrid Lindgren,
- plays by August Strindberg and Henrik Ibsen,
- stories by Heinrich Böll,
- novels by Boris Vian and Romain Gary,
- works of Friedrich Schiller, Knut Hamsun, Herman Bang, Gerhart Hauptmann, Colette and many others

She is the subject of a 15-episode TV documentary "Podstrochnik" ("Translation") by director Oleg Dorman. The documentary was forbidden from showing for 11 years but after the release became a TV hit that won the TEFI prize in 2010. Her monologue has been published as a book Word for Word: A Memoir, which also contains the text that had not been included in the documentary. The book was a bestseller in Russia.

She was the wife of the screenwriter Semen Lungin (1920–96) and the mother of film director Pavel Lungin.

== Books ==
- Word for Word: A Translator's Memoir of Literature, Politics, and Survival in Soviet Russia. - Lilianna Lungina as told to Oleg Dorman. [Translated from the Russian by Polly Gannon and Ast. A. Moore.] London: Overlook Duckworth, 2014.
- Les saisons de Moscou : 1933-1990 : racontées à Claude Kiejman par Lila Lounguina. Paris: Plon, 1990.
