= Female Novel =

- Genre: Telenovela
- Written by: Marina Mareeva
- Directed by: Sergei Snezhkin
- Starring: Dina Korzun; Konstantin Khabensky
- Composer: Sergei Banevich
- Country of origin: Russia
- Original language: Russian
- No. of series: 1
- No. of episodes: 20

Production
- Producer: Sergei Avrutin
- Cinematography: Vladislav Gurchin

Original release
- Network: Channel One Russia

Female Novel (Russian: Женский роман, romanized: Zhenskiy roman) is a 2005 Russian telenovela series directed by Sergei Snezhkin based on the novel The Steadfast Tin Soldatov by Marina Mareeva.

== Plot ==
An accident occurs during a hot summer day in which two expensive cars collide. In the "Volvo" is Kirill with his girlfriend Lolita. He is a successful and attractive publisher. In the "Saab" Andrei is driver with Evgenia as passenger along with her son. She works as a photographer in a studio. Kirill can charm women by using his mere gaze so that they are immediately ready to do anything, just to be with him. He wants to use this trick as bait for Evgenia, since he becomes infatuated with her. But Evgeniya does not succumb to either the seductive gaze nor for the love of the casual acquaintance. After the car accident the young mother's life changes radically.

== Cast ==
- Dina Korzun as Evgenia
- Konstantin Khabensky as Kirill
- Artur Vakha as Pyotr
- Aleksandr Domogarov as Oleg Ermakov
- Era Ziganshina as Alina Borisovna
- Mikhail Wasserbaum as Ilya
- Ivan Krasko as Vladislav Petrovich
- Oksana Akinshina as Ksenia
- Daria Lesnikova as Nadya
- Yan Tsapnik as Torchinski
- Valeriy Kukhareshin as Popov
- Anna Basnchikova as Natasha / Lolita
- Sergei Barkovsky as Viktor
- Sergei Koshonin as psychologist
- Marina Rokina as Lena
- Andrei Astrakhantsev as Andrei
