= Container (TV series) =

- Genre: Drama; Melodrama; Thriller; Crime
- Created by: Maksim Sveshnikov
- Written by: Alexey Lyapichev; Vadim Sveshnikov; Nikolai Muratov
- Directed by: Maksim Sveshnikov; Alexey Lyapichev
- Starring: Oksana Akinshina; Filipp Yankovsky; Maria Fomina; Maria Lobanova
- Composers: Ruslan Tagiev; Andrey Timonin
- Country of origin: Russia
- Original language: Russian
- No. of seasons: 3
- No. of episodes: 24

Production
- Producers: Eduard Iloyan; Vitaly Shlyappo; Denis Zhalinsky; Alexey Trotsyuk
- Production location: Moscow
- Cinematography: Ilya Averbakh
- Running time: 45 minutes
- Production company: Start Studio

Original release
- Network: Start; Channel One
- Release: September 9, 2021 – November 2, 2023

Container (Russian: Конте́йнер) is a Russian dramatic television series produced by the streaming service Start. The series explores the themes of surrogacy and social inequality.

== Plot ==
The story centers on the issue of surrogacy. The main character, a 29-year-old woman who is eight months pregnant, is carrying a child as a surrogate for a wealthy family. At the request of the intended parents, and for additional compensation, she moves into their country house. What initially appears to be a safe and caring solution gradually turns into a series of trials for everyone living under the same roof.

== Cast ==
Actor	Role
Oksana Akinshina	Sasha, the surrogate mother
Filipp Yankovsky	Vadim Yuryevich Belozerov, Deputy Minister
Maria Fomina	Marina Alexandrovna Belozerova, Vadim's wife
Maria Lobanova	Anya, Sasha’s sister / daughter
Elizaveta Shakira	Eva, Vadim’s daughter
Dmitry Chebotaryov	Vitalik
Yuliya Aug	Valentina, Sasha’s mother
Sergey Godin	Dmitry Olegovich Chernov
Nino Kantaria	Kira
Rostislav Bershauer	Roman, investigator
Artyom Bystrov	Igor Razumovsky, Sasha’s former lover

== Production ==
Filming began in November 2020. The series was created by the same team that previously worked on 257 Reasons to Live.

The premiere took place at the 43rd Moscow International Film Festival in April 2021. In July 2021, the series was screened at the Série Series festival in Fontainebleau, France.

The series premiered on START in September 2021 and was renewed for a second season following its success.

In spring 2022, a worldwide premiere on Apple TV+ was planned, which would have made the series the first Russian Apple Original, but the deal was later suspended.

The third season was filmed in 2023 and became the final season. Its premiere took place on 14 September 2023.

== Reception ==
Film critic Ilona Egizarova noted that the title Container was chosen deliberately, as the word evokes different associations, but within the context of the series the woman herself becomes a “container,” reduced from a human being to a function.

Critic Alexander Kostin described the series as a creative reinterpretation of melodramatic classics, infused with a distinctly Russian social perspective.
