= The State Counsellor (film) =

The State Counsellor Статский советник
- Film poster
- Directed by: Filipp Yankovsky
- Written by: Boris Akunin
- Starring: Oleg Menshikov; Nikita Mikhalkov; Konstantin Khabensky
- Distributed by: Karo Premiere
- Release date: 21 April 2005
- Running time: 134 minutes
- Country: Russia
- Language: Russian

The State Counsellor (Russian: Статский советник, romanized: Statskiy sovetnik) is a 2005 Russian historical mystery film, an adaptation of Boris Akunin's novel of the same name featuring detective Erast Fandorin. Directed by Filipp Yankovsky, it was one of the most expensive films ever made in Russia.

A revolutionary organisation is planning to assassinate the Governor of Moscow as the first step to overthrowing the Tsarist state. Detective Erast Fandorin attempts to counter them, but his efforts are hindered by his dealings with Prince Pozharsky.

The film's promotional title in Russian uses the erroneous spelling Статский совѣтникъ which is neither modern Статский советник, nor pre-Revolutionary Статскій совѣтникъ.

== Plot ==
The film is set in the Russian Empire at the turn of the 19th century.

The Petersburg-Moscow train stops at the Klin station, the last one before Moscow. In the special car where under high security travels the minister of the tsarist government – Adjutant-General Khrapov – a man appears who introduces himself as state councilor Erast Fandorin, an official for special assignments to the Moscow governor-general responsible for Khrapov's security in Moscow. The arriving person presents his documents and because he matches the verbal portrait of Fandorin with which the guards are familiar, he is let in to see the general. Soon the general is found dead in the compartment and on the handle of a bloody blade there is a mark "BG" – the sign of the elusive terrorist "Combat Group" which wreaks terror in both capitals. The terrorist who impersonated Fandorin – head of the "BG" nicknamed Green – successfully disappears from the scene of the crime and settles in Moscow with three accomplices, Rakhmet, Emelya and Snegir, where the local revolutionary, Needle, helps them. Lack of involvement in the case by the real Fandorin is immediately apparent as soon as he meets with the general's guards: the terrorist resembled Fandorin only a little and was made up in order to enhance the similarities.

The murder of Khrapov was a "slap in the face” of the government, which means the inevitable dismissal of the Moscow Governor-General Dolgorutsky. Frustrated with everything that has happened, Dolgorutsky asks Fandorin, with whom he was always pleased, to do everything to find the general's killers quickly and on his own to earn the right to retire with dignity without being disgraced. Fandorin, famous for his deductive method, starts an investigation and the first clue comes from the terrorists themselves: from the circumstances of the case it is clear that the killers knew who provides the security of the general and had a description of Fandorin. Fandorin was appointed responsible for Khrapov's visit only the day before, and this was only known to the St. Petersburg Police Department and three employees of the Moscow gendarmerie. Obviously it was only this narrow circle of people who could have leaked the information.

Fandorin investigates and manages to detain one of the members of the group, Rakhmet, who was quickly removed from the investigation by the celebrated investigator, General Prince Pozharsky, who came specially from Petersburg with a nominal command. In the meantime, BG continues to operate, this time replenishing the party cash desk: the treasury coach has been robbed, security has been broken, and a huge amount of money has been stolen. Fandorin decides to find out who is passing information to BG by giving all suspects different information and checking how the terrorists react. The completely unexpected reaction of BG forces Fandorin to suspect even his own beloved for a moment, but he still finds the correct, albeit incredible, answer to his question. BG’s "source" is Prince Pozharsky himself.

Pozharsky organizes an operation to seize the Combat Group, planning a shootout in which Fandorin will perish in an "unbelievable accident." But Fandorin remains alive thanks to his dexterity; Snegir and Emelya perish; and only Green remains of the group, who continues to be helped by Needle who fell in love with him.

In a private conversation Pozharsky admits that Fandorin's conclusions are correct: the general did supply information to BG initially to use terrorists to get rid of the rivals' and to frighten officials, and then to act as the sole savior of the state that destroyed the elusive group and receive power and privilege for it. Now, after the provoked retirement of Dolgorutsky, the Moscow Governor-General will become the Grand Duke Simeon, the patron of Pozharsky, and Pozharsky himself will rise to the rank of a Moscow Chief Policeman. Fandorin can not openly speak out against Pozharsky: they just would not believe him. Pozharsky suggests that Fandorin become an ally, or simply "step aside and remain silent". Fandorin chooses the latter, because unlike Pozharsky, he knows that Green had already guessed about the betrayal of his assistant, Julie Renard, through whom Pozharsky slipped the group information about the objects of the terrorist attacks, and Green forced Julie to make an appointment with Pozharsky. As a result, Pozharsky goes on the call of Julie to destroy Green and gain the laurels of the sole winner of the Combat Group, and Fandorin merely tells him in a whisper: "Evil devours itself." And thus it indeed happens: Pozharsky kills Green and Julie, but he himself also dies with Needle who sabotaged him and herself, before death to whom he refers by real name – Countess Dobrinskaya.

The new governor-general offers Fandorin the post of chief policeman and his patronage. At first Fandorin brusquely refuses, but after exhortations of the former governor-general's old servant, he returns to Simeon's office and gives his consent.

== Cast ==
- Oleg Menshikov as Erast Fandorin
- Nikita Mikhalkov as Prince Pozharsky
- Konstantin Khabensky as Green
- Vladimir Mashkov as Tikhon Bogoyavlenskii
- Emilia Spivak as Esfir
- Oksana Fandera as Countess Olga Alekseevna Dobrinskaya terrorist "Needle"
- Yuri Kolokolnikov as Lieutenant Smolyaninov
- Oleksiy Gorbunov as security agent "Gvidon" Nikolai I. Seleznev, terrorist "Rakhmet"
- Fyodor Bondarchuk as Colonel Pyotr Ivanovich Burchinsky
- Oleg Tabakov as Prince Vladimir Andreevich Dolgorutsky Moscow Governor-General
- Maria Mironova as Julie Renard
- Alexander Strizhenov as prince Simeon Alexandrovich
- Pavel Belozerov as engineer Larionov agent of the secret police and "combat group"
- Andrei Lebedev as doctor
- Filipp Yankovsky as drunk hussar in the salon of Julie
- Rostislav Yankovsky as Minister Ivan Fedorovich Khrapov Adjutant-General
- Olga Yurasova as Masonic revolutionary
- Ekaterina Vulichenko as maid
- Vladimir Krasnov as valet Prince Dolgorutsky Frol Vedishchev
- Masami Ogava as Masa, Fandorin's Japanese manservant
- Vladimir Zaitsev as captain von Seydlitz chief security officer Khrapova
- Igor Yasulovich as chemist Aronzon

== Awards ==
- Golden Eagle Award
  - Best Male Actor (Nikita Mikhalkov)
  - Best Supporting Actor (Konstantin Khabensky)
- Nika Award
  - Best Art Design (Vladimir Aronin)
- Kinotavr
  - Best Male Actor (Nikita Mikhalkov)

== Reception ==
Reception of The State Counsellor in Russian media was overwhelmingly positive. According to the Russian review aggregator Kritikanstvo, it received no negative reviews and was rated 9 out of 10 on average.
