= Sultan Islamov =

Russian actor (born 1965)

Sultan Islamov Султан Исламов
- Birth name: Sultan Adlanovich Islamov
- Born: February 14, 1965 (age 60)
- Origin: Hidi, Nozhai-Yurt, Chechen-Ingush ASSR, Soviet Union
- Genres: Music of Chechnya
- Occupation(s): singer, actor
- Instrument: Voice
- Years active: since 1989

Sultan Islamov (Chechen: Султан Исламов Russian: Султан Исламов) (born February 14, 1965, in Hidi, Chechnya) is a Russian actor and singer of Chechen origins.

== Biography ==
Sultan was born in the village of Hidi in the Nozhai-Yurt farm area to a large rural family, with four brothers and four sisters. His father served as a brigadier in the Soviet Army and his mother was a housewife. As a child, Sultan wrote for photographs of the actor Andrei Martynov and actresses in that movie, which he would add to a collection of photos of well-known actors and actresses throughout the Soviet Union. He remained active in art and music in school, as well as in his village's Culture House.

After graduating from secondary school Sultan went to Moscow to pursue his acting dreams, and he applied to every drama school in the capital, yet was not accepted by any of the schools he applied to. While serving in the Army Sultan played a small role in the army film "The World is Your Home". In 1985 after his fifth and last try, Sultan was allowed to audition for the Gerasimov Institute of Cinematography.

Sultan returned home, but later decided to continue his study at the Tursunzade Institute of Culture in Tajikistan, where he would study for six months before returning to his native village. Sultan started working in the school, and soon became the artistic director of his village's Culture House, and even worked on the village farm. Sultan would also join the Communist Party of the Soviet Union.

In 1989 the Chechen-Ingush State University announced their first set of a Theatre Workshop, and this time Sultan was credited for his acting experience and education. He gained a role in the massive play "Land of the Fathers", which included many prominent Chechen actors. Sultan would practice alongside actor Akhmed Zakayev, who would later become the Foreign Minister of the separatist Chechen Republic of Ichkeria. However, Sultan would have to take a break from this play, to go to Moscow to receive plastic surgery on his nose.

He has been living in Moscow since 2000. In 2001, he represented the Chechen Republic with the Lovzar Ensemble at the Slavyansky Bazar International Festival.

== Selected filmography ==
=== Films ===
Year	Title	Role	Other notes
2002	House of Fools	Ahmed	
