= The Wedding (2000 film) =

2000 film

- German DVD cover
- Directed by: Pavel Lungin
- Written by: Pavel Lungin; Aleksandr Galin
- Produced by: Catherine Dussart; Erik Waisberg
- Starring: Marat Basharov; Maria Mironova; Andrei Panin
- Cinematography: Aleksandr Burov
- Edited by: Sophie Brunet
- Release date: 27 September 2000
- Running time: 114 minutes
- Countries: France; Russia
- Language: Russian

The Wedding (Russian: Свадьба, romanized: Svadba, French: La noce) is a 2000 French-Russian comedy film directed by Pavel Lungin. It was entered into the 2000 Cannes Film Festival. The film was the Aurora Award winner at the Tromsø International Film Festival in 2001.

== Plot ==
Tanya returns to her hometown after working as a model in Moscow. She decides to marry Mishka. A series of unexpected events arise during the process.

== Cast ==
- Marat Basharov as Mishka
- Maria Mironova as Tanya
- Andrey Panin as Garkusha
- Aleksander Semchev as Borzov
- Vladimir Simonov as Borodin
- Maria Golubkina as Sveta
- Natalya Kolyakanova as Rimma
- Yelena Novikova as Zoika
- Oleg Esaulenko as Svetlanov
- Marina Golub as café manager
- Vladimir Kashpur as grandfather
- Nadezhda Markina as Valka
- Galina Petrova as mother
- Pavel Polmatov as Tolya
- Ilya Rutberg as Kamussidi
- Vladimir Salnikov as father
