= Pavel Lungin =

Russian film director

- Па́вел Семёнович Лунги́н
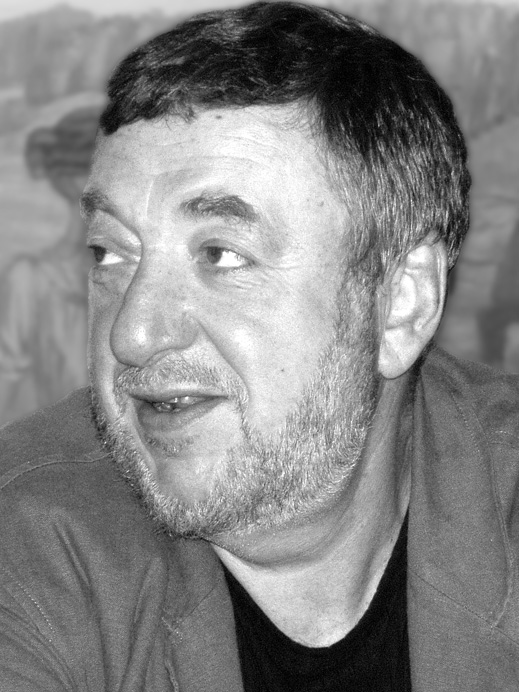
- Lungin in June 2008
- Born: Pavel Semyonovich Lungin; 12 July 1949 (age 77); Moscow, Russian SFSR, Soviet Union
- Occupations: Film director, screenwriter
- Spouse: Elena Lungina
- Children: 2
- Pavel Lungin's voice From the Echo of Moscow program, 8 April 2012

Pavel Semyonovich Lungin (Russian: Па́вел Семёнович Лунги́н; born 12 July 1949) is a Russian film director. He is sometimes credited as Pavel Loungine (as in the American release of Tycoon). Lungin was awarded the distinction People's Artist of Russia in 2008.

== Life and career ==
Born on 12 July 1949 in Moscow, Lungin is the son of the scriptwriter Semyon Lungin and linguist Lilianna Lungina. He later attended Moscow State University at the Mathematics and Applied Linguistics of the Philological Faculty, from which he graduated in 1971. In 1980 he completed the High Courses for Scriptwriters and Film Directors (Mikhail Lvovsky's Workshop).

Lungin worked primarily as a scriptwriter until given the opportunity to direct Taxi Blues at age 40. The film starred well-known musician Pyotr Mamonov. For the film he received the Best Director Prize at 1990 Cannes Film Festival. That same year he took up residence in France, while making films in and about Russia with French producers. Two years later, his next film Luna Park would also compete at the 1992 Cannes Film Festival.

In 1993 he was a member of the jury at the 18th Moscow International Film Festival.

He was the librettist for Nikolai Karetnikov's opera Till Eulenspiegel (written 1983) and Karetnikov's oratorio The Mystery of St. Paul.

At the 2000 Cannes Film Festival, Pavel Lungin's film The Wedding was awarded the Special Jury Prize for the best ensemble cast.

In 2001 Pavel Lungin began shooting his new film Tycoon based on Julii Dubov's novel The Big Ration. The picture was a drama set during the Mikhail Gorbachev years about five students who jump on the private capitalism movement. The film was released in Russia in October 2002.

Lungin made the black comedy Poor Relatives in 2005, winner of the main prize of the Kinotavr 2005 Festival, and a television miniseries based on Nikolai Gogol's works, titled The Case of "Dead Souls", which premiered on NTV in September 2005. Both Poor Relatives and The Case of "Dead Souls" starred Konstantin Khabensky.

In 2006 he directed the religious film The Island which also had Mamonov in the lead role. The film closed the 63rd Venice International Film Festival and was praised by the Russian Orthodox Church leader Alexis II.

He was the president of the jury at the 31st Moscow International Film Festival in 2009. In the same year he made the film Tsar with Pyotr Mamonov and Oleg Yankovskiy. The film competed in the Un Certain Regard section at the 2009 Cannes Film Festival.

In March 2014 he signed a letter in support of the position of the President of Russia Vladimir Putin on Russia's military intervention in Ukraine and Crimea. For this he was banned from entering Ukraine. Crimea is since March 2014 under Russian occupation.

Lungin directed the thriller The Queen of Spades in 2016. The picture is about opera singers preparing for a performance in the Queen of Spades.

From 2015 he is the director of political thriller television series Homeland, a localized adaptation of Prisoners of War.

In 2019, along with his son Aleksander, Lungin won the Golden Goblet Award for Best Screenplay at the Shanghai International Film Festival.

== Filmography (as director) ==
=== Films ===
- Taxi Blues (1990)
- Luna Park (1992)
- Lifeline (1996)
- The Wedding (2000)
- Tycoon (2002)
- Poor Relatives (2005)
- The Island (2006)
- Branch of Lilac (2007) (transliterated from original Vetka sireni)
- Tsar (2009)
- The Conductor (2012)
- The Queen of Spades (2016)
- Leaving Afghanistan (2019)
- Esau (2019)

=== TV ===
- The Case of "Dead Souls" (2005)
- Homeland (2015)
