= Sentimental Journey to the Potatoes =

- Russian: Сентиментальное путешествие на картошку
- Directed by: Dmitry Dolinin
- Written by: Andrey Smirnov
- Starring: Filipp Yankovsky; Anzhelika Nevolina; Pyotr Semak; Andrey Gusev; Vasili Arkanov
- Cinematography: Vladimir Ivanov
- Music by: Vitali Chernitsky
- Release date: 1986
- Running time: 83 minute
- Country: Soviet Union
- Language: Russian

Sentimental Journey to the Potatoes (Russian: Сентиментальное путешествие на картошку, romanized: Sentimentalnoye puteshestviye na kartoshku, lit. 'Sentimental Journey to Potato Harvesting') is a 1986 Soviet romance film directed by Dmitry Dolinin.

== Plot ==
The film tells about a young man who, after successfully entering the institute, goes to the village to harvest potato (a late Soviet form of forced labor to engage certain categories of urban dwellers in severely undermanned Soviet agriculture) and there he meets new and interesting people and a girl whom he loves.

== Cast ==
- Filipp Yankovsky
- Anzhelika Nevolina
- Pyotr Semak
- Andrey Gusev
- Vasili Arkanov
- Nikolai Ustinov
- Yevgeniya Barkan
- Fyodor Valikov
- Elvira Kolotukhina
- Sergey Russkin
