= House of Fools (film) =

- Directed by: Andrei Konchalovsky
- Written by: Andrei Konchalovsky
- Produced by: Felix Kleiman; Andrei Konchalovsky
- Starring: Julia Visotskaya; Sultan Islamov; Yevgeni Mironov
- Cinematography: Sergei Kozlov
- Music by: Eduard Artemyev
- Distributed by: Paramount Classics
- Release date: 2002
- Running time: 104 minutes
- Country: Russia
- Languages: Russian, Chechen

House of Fools (Russian: Дом дураков, Dom durakov) is a 2002 Russian film by Andrei Konchalovsky about psychiatric patients and combatants during the First Chechen War. It stars Julia Vysotskaya and Sultan Islamov and features a number of cameo appearances by Bryan Adams, with the music composed by Eduard Artemyev.

Distinctly anti-war and controversial in Russia, House of Fools is a bizarre blend of black comedy, touching drama, horrific warfare and subtly disturbing psychological content. The film was screened in the competition at the 59th Venice International Film Festival and won Grand Special Jury Prize and UNICEF Award and was also selected as the Russian entry for the Best Foreign Language Film at the 77th Academy Awards, but it didn't make the final shortlist.

== Plot ==
At a psychiatric hospital in the Russian republic of Ingushetia on the border with war-torn republic of Chechnya in 1996, medical staff are vanishing to apparently find help as the patients are left to their own endeavors. Zhanna (Yuliya Vysotskaya), a young woman, lives in the belief that the pop star Bryan Adams is her fiancé, that he is off on tour and will, at some point in the future, come to take her away with him. Zhanna is sort of the ad hoc keeper of peace, happiness and control of the others; she attempts to help curb some of the other patients exuberant impulses. Blissfully unaware of the terror of the war, the patients stick it out in the hospital. Their guests include a group of Chechen rebels, one of whom, Ahmed (Sultan Islamov), gives Zhanna the idea that he will marry her. At this point Zhanna falls in love with Ahmed. She goes back to the "House" where, with the help of her fellow residents, she prepares for her marriage to Ahmed. From this point on Zhanna prepares for and expects to be swept away by Ahmed. Her hopes do not come to fruition and Ahmed and Zhanna part ways. Zhanna returns to the "House" in order to resume her life there.

== Production notes ==
The story was partially inspired by the real-life tragedy of the psychiatric hospital in Shali, Chechnya, which was abandoned by the personnel during the Russian bombing campaign and in which many patients subsequently died from attacks and neglect.

The story also mirrors the plot of Philippe de Broca's 1967 French cult classic film King of Hearts (Le Roi de coeur, starring Alan Bates) about the inmates of an asylum abandoned by the staff during World War I who take over the neighboring town. The two films even share similarities in their conclusion, with a soldier taking refuge from the insanity of war in the asylum when it returns to normal. Although there are some similar aspects to King Of Hearts, the difference in the two films is that the inmates/patients in King of Hearts take on the various personalities of the town folk; mayor, baker, prostitute, etc.

== Selected cast ==
- Julia Vysotskaya as Zhanna
- Sultan Islamov as Ahmed
- Yevgeni Mironov as Russian officer
- Stanislav Varkki as Ali
- Bryan Adams as himself
- Cecilie Thomsen as Lithuanian sniper
- Pavel Grachev as himself (archival footage)
- Vladimir Fyodorov as Karlusha
- Maria Politseymako as Vika

The film also features several genuine mental patients alongside actors.

== Reception ==
=== Critical response ===
House of Fools received a rating of 52/100 at Metacritic, based on 23 critics, indicating "mixed or average reviews". On the review aggregation website Rotten Tomatoes, the film has an approval rating of 41% based on 49 reviews, and an average rating of 5.2/10. The website's critical consensus states,"House of Fools has a potentially intriguing fact-based story to tell, but an insensitive approach to depicting mental illness undermines its effectiveness".

Chicago Sun-Times film critic Roger Ebert gave the film three out of four stars, saying that House of Fools is "A film that succeeds not by arguing that the world is crazier than the asylum, but by arriving at the melancholy possibility that both are equally insane."

=== Awards and nominations ===
Awards:

- Venice Film Festival — Grand Special Jury Prize
- Venice Film Festival — UNICEF Award
- Bergen International Film Festival — Jury Award (Honorable Mention)

Nominations:

- Venice Film Festival — Golden Lion
- Academy Award — Best Foreign Language Film (representing Russia)
- Nika Awards — Best Music

== See also ==
- List of submissions to the 75th Academy Awards for Best Foreign Language Film
- List of Russian submissions for the Academy Award for Best Foreign Language Film
