= Oksana Fandera =

Soviet and Russian actress

- Оксана Фандера
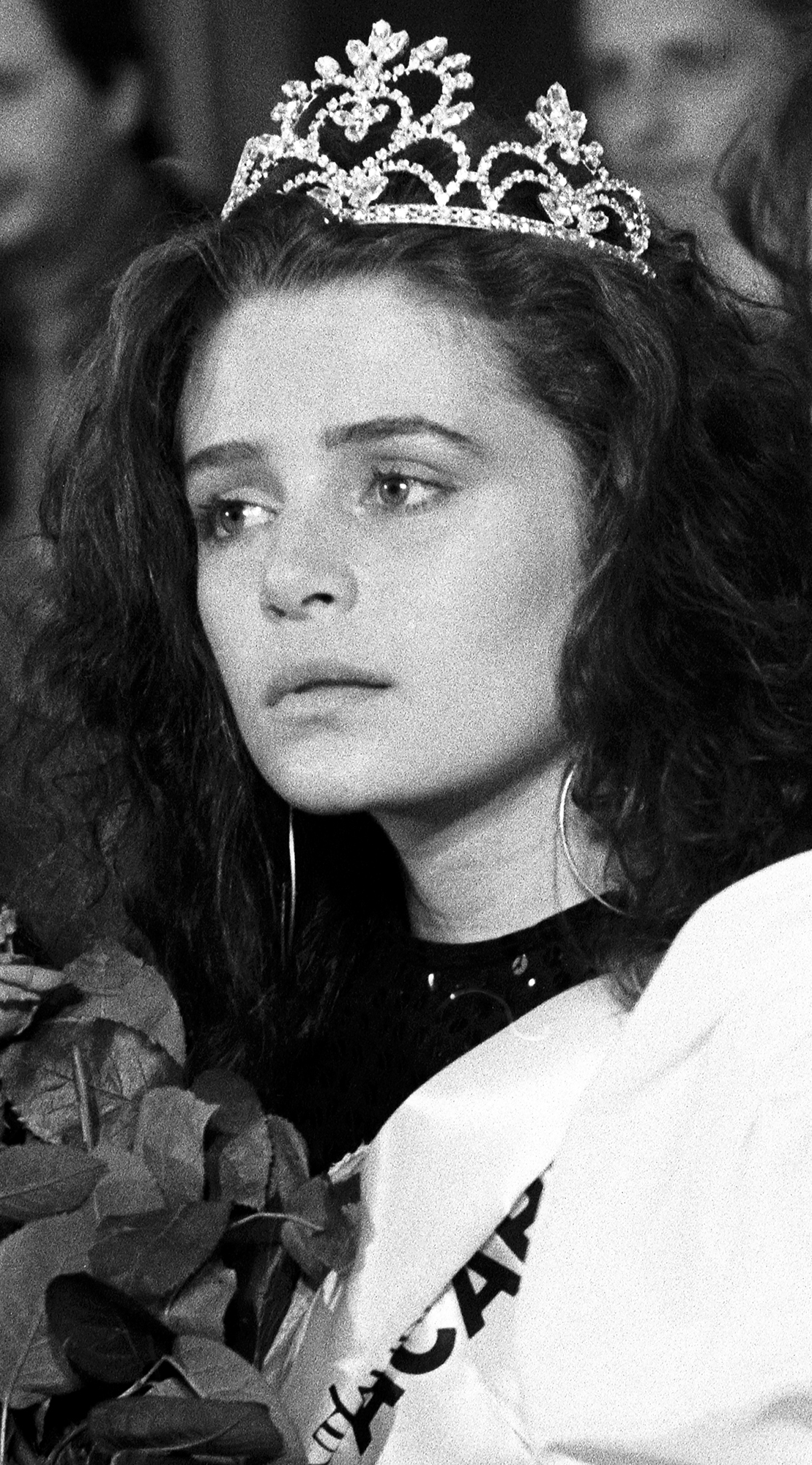
- Soviet stage and screen actress Oksana Fandera early in her career, at the "Moscow Beauty '88" pageant, 1988.
- Born: November 7, 1967 (age 59); Odessa, Ukrainian SSR, Soviet Union
- Citizenship: Soviet Union (until 1991); Russia
- Occupation: Actress
- Years active: 1979–present
- Spouse: Filipp Yankovsky (m. 1990)
- Children: 2, including Ivan

Oksana Olegovna Fandera (Russian: Оксана Олеговна Фандера; born November 7, 1967) is a Soviet and Russian actress.

== Biography ==
Oksana Olegovna Fandera was born on November 7, 1967 in Odessa.

Her father was the actor Oleg Fandera. In the 1960s he was part of the Odessa Russian Theatre troupe. Oleg moved to Khabarovsk in the early 1970s, worked at the Drama Theater of the Red Banner Far Eastern Military District (KDVO) in Ussuriysk. Her parents divorced, and when Oksana was fourteen years old, her mother, Larisa Krigmont, remarried, and they moved to Moscow.

She debuted in cinema in 1979, with an episodic role in the film The Adventures of the Elektronic.

In 1988, Oksana Fandera took second place at the first beauty contest in the USSR "Moscow Beauty".

In 1993, she graduated from the Russian Academy of Theatre Arts, workshop of Anatoly Vasiliev.

Fandera married director Filipp Yankovsky in 1990 and appeared in his films In Motion (2002), The State Counsellor (2005) and Rock Head (2008).

In 2010, the actress starred in the drama "Pro Lyuboff" about the Russian elite, where her screen partner was Fyodor Bondarchuk. Fandera played in the satirical picture by Boris Khlebnikov Before the Night Will Tear us Apart which was made in 2012. In the same year, the movie Brothel Lights was released, in which the actress she played the main role of brothel madam Lyuba, who is in love with a mentally disturbed poet.

Oksana Fandera was awarded the Special Jury Diploma at the 2011 Kinotavr festival.

In 2016, Fandera performed one of the main roles in the series Elusive. In 2017, the actress worked on the drama film by Klim Shipenko Salyut 7, dedicated to saving the Soviet space station Salyut 7 in 1985.

== Personal life ==
In 1990, Oksana Fandera married Filipp Yankovsky. They have two children, Ivan and Elizaveta.

== Selected filmography ==
- 1979 — The Adventures of the Elektronic
- 1990 — Stalingrad
- 2002 — In Motion
- 2002 — Stereoblood
- 2005 — The State Counsellor
- 2011 — Brothel Lights
- 2012 — Before the Night Will Tear us Apart
- 2016 — Brutus
- 2017 — Salyut 7
