= Hidi =

Hidi is a surname. Notable people with the surname include:

- Andre Hidi (born 1960), Canadian ice hockey player
- Isli Hidi (born 1980), Albanian footballer
- Patrik Hidi (born 1990), Hungarian footballer
