= Filipp Yankovsky =

Russian actor and film director (born 1968)

- Филипп Янковский
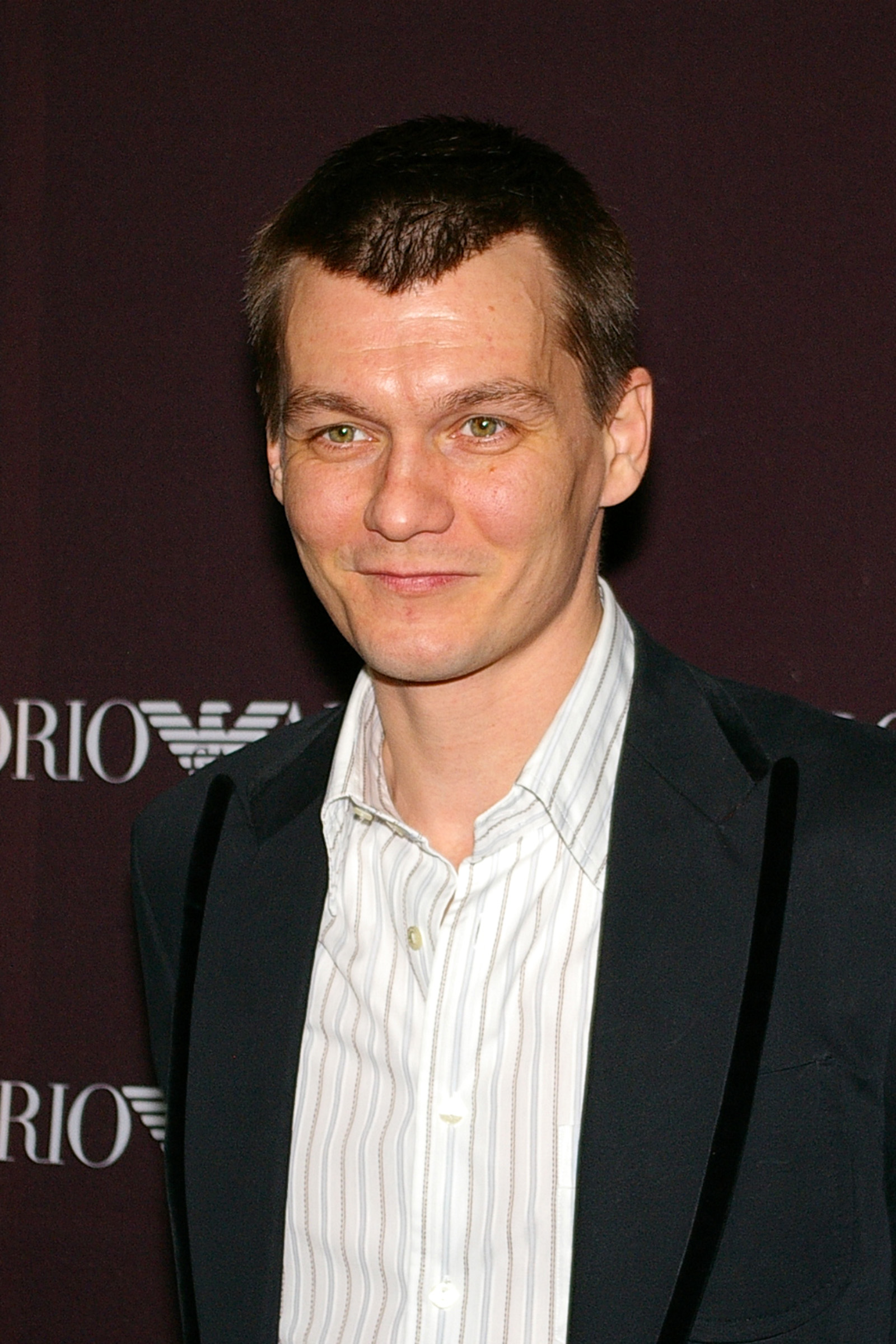
- Yankovsky in 2009
- Born: Filipp Olegovich Yankovsky; 10 October 1968 (age 57); Saratov, Soviet Union
- Occupations: Filmmaker, actor
- Years active: 1974–present
- Spouse(s): Oksana Fandera, 2 children

Filipp Olegovich Yankovsky (Russian: Фили́пп Оле́гович Янко́вский) is a Russian actor and film director. He was born on 10 October 1968 to actor Oleg Yankovsky.

== Life and career ==
Filipp Yankovsky was born on 10 October 1968 in Saratov in the family of actors Oleg Yankovsky and Lyudmila Zorina. At that time, his parents played at the Saratov Drama Theater. When Filipp turned four, the family moved to Moscow.

His first role as an actor was in the 1975 film Mirror by Andrei Tarkovsky. In the same year he had an uncredited role in Under a Stone Sky. Filipp's first role as a grown-up was in Sentimental Journey to Potatoes (1986).

In 1990 he graduated from the Moscow Art Theater School (Oleg Tabakov's course). Then he studied at VGIK from 1990 until 2004 at the directing faculty (workshop of Vladimir Naumov).

Yankovsky began his directorial career with music videos — he has made approximately 150 music videos. In 1997, he was nominated for the Ovation Award as the best music video director.

He made his directorial debut in 2002 with the feature film In Motion, for which he was awarded the "Discovery of the Year" prize at the Nika Awards in 2003 and the audience award at Kinotavr. The film was about Sasha Guriev (Konstantin Khabensky), a successful and charming journalist who suddenly realizes that he has found compromising evidence on his politician friend.

His next directorial work was the 2005 screen version of Boris Akunin's detective novel The State Counsellor. Oleg Menshikov, Nikita Mikhalkov and Konstantin Khabensky were the lead actors of the picture. In 2006 he directed The Sword Bearer which starred Artyom Tkachenko and Chulpan Khamatova.

== Personal life ==
=== Family ===
- Wife - Oksana Fandera, actress; children:
  - Son - Ivan Yankovsky (born October 30, 1990), actor.
    - Grandson - Oleg Yankovsky (b.2021).
  - Daughter - Elizaveta Yankovskaya (born May 1, 1995).

=== Health ===
When Filipp was 41, he was diagnosed with lymphoma. In 2016 it was reported that Yankovsky has been cured from stage III cancer, after undergoing chemotherapy seven times.

== Selected filmography ==
As actor:

- 1975 Mirror (Зеркало) as 5-year-old Alyosha
- 1986 Sentimental Journey to the Potatoes (Сентиментальное путешествие на картошку)
- 1991 Afghan Breakdown (Афганский излом) as Nikita Steklov, senior lieutenant
- 1998 Day of the Full Moon (День полнолуния) as Monk
- 2005 The State Counsellor (Статский советник) as a drunk hussar
- 2011 Raspoutine (Распутин) as Felix Yusupov
- 2013 The Three Musketeers (Три мушкетера) as Louis XIII
- 2014 Wonderworker (Чудотворец) as Nikolai Arbenin
- 2016 Mysterious passion (Таинственная страсть) as Yan Tushinsky
- 2016 Brutus (Брут) as Horst
- 2023 Container (Контейнер) as Vadim Belozerov
- 2022 We (Мы) - unreleased
- 2022 Monastery as Varsonofy

As director

- 2002 In Motion (В движении)
- 2005 The State Counsellor (Статский советник)
- 2006 The Sword Bearer (Меченосец)
- 2008 Rock Head (Каменная башка)

== Bibliography ==
- Holmstrom, John. The Moving Picture Boy: An International Encyclopaedia from 1895 to 1995. Norwich, Michael Russell, 1996, p. 371.
