= In Motion (film) =

In Motion В движении
- Directed by: Filipp Yankovsky
- Written by: Gennadiy Ostrovskiy
- Produced by: Fyodor Bondarchuk; Stepan Mikhalkov; Viktor Glukhov; Sergei Melkumov; Yelena Yatsura
- Starring: Konstantin Khabensky; Elena Perova; Oksana Fandera
- Cinematography: Sergei Machilskiy
- Music by: Danila Kalashnik
- Production companies: Production Company "Slovo"; Art Pictures Studio
- Release date: 2002
- Running time: 94 minutes
- Country: Russia
- Language: Russian

In Motion (Russian: В движении, romanized: V dvizhenii) is a 2002 Russian drama film, directorial debut of Filipp Yankovsky. Its plot shares some similarities to La Dolce Vita by Federico Fellini.

== Plot ==
Alexander Guryev is a successful independent journalist whose life has been full of many adventures. Now Sasha is looking for interesting stories and sensations which will earn good money. But Sasha is haunted by failures after such searches and more often than not he runs into big trouble, but still he continues to search for the next bombshell.

Sasha's personal life is different: he is married, but he is no longer attracted to his wife Vera. The passion is gone and only memories remain. Every day Sasha meets various women, with some he has short-term romantic relationships. And his wife Vera continues to hope that one day her and Sasha's life will change for the better.

And then one day Sasha meets an old friend who returned from abroad in order to occupy a major political post. Guryev suddenly realizes that he himself has dug up compromising evidence on his own friend. He begins to understand that his friend is in danger. Now there is only one way out – to run for as long as it is possible, so that at least he can save himself.

== Cast ==
- Konstantin Khabensky – Alexander (Sasha) Guryev
- Oksana Fandera – Vera
- Oksana Akinshina – Anya
- Fyodor Bondarchuk – Gazizov
- Marina Golub – employee of the archive
- Leonid Gromov – investigator
- Sergei Gusinsky – judicial officer
- Mikhail Yefremov – Vovan
- Anastasia von Kalmanovich – Olga
- Gosha Kutsenko – guest
- Vyacheslav Razbegaev – groom in the club
- Alexei Makarov – Alexey
- Pavel Melenchuk – Sanyok
- Konstantin Murzenko – man with a briefcase
- Gennady Ostrovsky – waiter
- Elena Perova – Lisa Kolesova
- Olga Sidorova – Lena Zorina
- Alexandra Skachkova – Lyuda
- Alexander Tyutryumov – representative of MegaBank
- Nikolai Chindyajkin – Mityagin

== Release and reception ==
The film premiered at the Moscow International Film Festival in the program "Great Expectations". Izvestia wrote: "Almost the entire cinema audience laughed - from the content of dialogues, from the joy of familiarity and in order not to cry. All too recognizable was all that was happening on screen and too accurate".

== Awards ==
- 2003 Film festival "Vivat Cinema of Russia!" in St. Petersburg
  - Prize for Best Actor (Konstantin Khabensky)
- 2003 Kinotavr
  - Audience Award (Filipp Yankovsky)
- 2002 The New Russia Cinema Foundation
  - Diploma "For the highest spectator rating", Prize of the company "YUKOS" (Filipp Yankovsky)
- 2002 Film festival "Window to Europe" in Vyborg
  - Special jury prize for directorial debut (Filipp Yankovsky)
- 2002 International film festival "Listapad" in Minsk
  - Prize and Diploma of the jury of cinematographers "For the best direction" (Filipp Yankovsky)
- 2002 Golden Aries Award
  - For best film editing (Alexander Chupakov))
- 2002 Nika Award
  - For the best camerawork (Sergey Machilsky)
- 2002 Nika Award
  - In the nomination "Discovery of the Year" (Filipp Yankovsky)
- 2002 Prize of the Guild of Cinematographers of Russia "White Square"
  - (Sergey Machilsky)
