= Tycoon (2002 film) =

- Directed by: Pavel Lungin
- Written by: Aleksandr Borodyanskyy; Pavel Lungin; Yuli Dubov
- Produced by: Erich Weissberg
- Starring: Vladimir Mashkov; Mariya Mironova
- Edited by: Sophie Brunet
- Music by: Leonid Desyatnikov
- Release date: 2002
- Running time: 123 minutes
- Countries: Russia; France; Germany
- Language: Russian

Tycoon: A New Russian (Russian: Олигарх, romanized: Oligarch) is a 2002 Russian movie directed by Pavel Lungin. The movie is based on the book The Lion's Share (Bolshaya Paika) by Yuli Dubov, who later went on to work for oligarch Boris Abramovich Berezovsky.

== Plot ==
During the Mikhail Gorbachev years, Platon Makovsky and four buddies of his are university students who jump on the private capitalism movement. Fast-forward 20 years, Platon finds himself the richest man in Russia. But as such, he and his friends are drawn more and more into relations with suspect organizations. They also have to face ever more brutal attempts to subjugate them by the Kremlin. Makovsky attempts to compete with this ever-present political power, by becoming as "creating a Kremlin" himself.

== Characters ==
- Platon Makovsky - Vladimir Mashkov
- Mariya Koretskaya - Mariya Mironova
- Shmakov - Andrey Krasko
- Larri Teishvili - Levan Uchaneishvili
- Mark Tseytlin - Mikhail Vasserbaum
- Viktor Sysoyev - Sergey Yushkevich
- Musa Tariyev - Aleksandr Samoylenko
- Nina - Irina Kolyakanova
- General Koretskiy - Aleksandr Baluev
- Nikolai Lomov - Vladimir Gusev
- Pasha Belenkiy - Vladimir Steklov
- Koshkin - Marat Basharov
- Papa Grisha - Vladimir Salnikov
- Akhmet Tashkentsky - Vladimir Golovin
- Boat Captain - Vladimir Kashpur
- Journalist - Anna Churina

== Background ==
The film is based on "Bolshaya Paika" ("The Big Slice") - a novel by Yuli Dubov, depicting the real biography of Russian tycoon Boris Berezovsky and his partners. Dubov was Berezovsky's partner himself, and a president of his LogoVAZ company. The novel is claimed to be historically precise in many aspects. The names of the characters were changed from their real life counterparts, though keeping resemblance (e.g. Boris Berezovsky, who changed his name to Platon Elenin in exile in 2004, to Platon Makovsky, Badri Patarkatsishvili to Lari Teishvili, etc.)

In June 2009, Dubov and Berezovsky were convicted in absentia (at that time, they were both living in exile in England) in a Russian court for the events that served as the basis for the book to 9 and 13 years of imprisonment respectively. The book served as one of the pieces of evidence against them.

== Reception ==
=== Critical response ===
Tycoon has an approval rating of 46% on review aggregator website Rotten Tomatoes, based on 35 reviews, and an average rating of 5.60/10. The website's critical consensus states, "Wants to be The Godfather, but the movie's Citizen Kane-style narrative limits its effectiveness". It also has a score of 49 out of 100 on Metacritic, based on 17 critics, indicating "mixed of average".

The New Yorker stated: "Once a freedom-loving idealist, Platon used his genius to become a monster, unhesitatingly sacrificing his ideals and his closest friends. This is the tragedy of this super-talented individual who embodies all that is most creative in the new Russia and, at the same time, all which is worst for the country that he privatized for his own profit."

== See also ==
- Shock doctrine
