= Cinderella (2002 film) =

- Written by: Anton Fridlyand
- Directed by: Semen Horov
- Starring: Yulia Mavrina; Nikolay Baskov; Valery Leontiev; Valery Meladze; Lolita Milyavskaya
- Music by: Konstantin Meladze
- Country of origin: Russia; Ukraine
- Original language: Russian

Production
- Producers: Vlad Ryashin; Alexander Fayfman
- Cinematography: Alexey Stepanov
- Running time: 114 minutes
- Production companies: Channel One Russia; Inter; Melorama Production

Original release
- Network: Channel One Russia
- Release: 2002

Cinderella (Russian: «Золушка», romanized: Zolushka) is a 2002 Russian-Ukrainian musical film produced by Melorama Production in association with Channel One (Russia) and Inter (Ukraine), under direction of Semen Horov in 2002.

== Plot ==
The king struggles to find a wife for his son, who is solely interested in science. An astrologer advises the king to host a grand royal ball. Cinderella, eager to attend, is forced by her stepmother and stepsisters to make dresses for them. Once the dresses are ready, they leave her behind with additional chores. However, her fairy godmother appears and helps her get to the ball, with one condition: she must return by midnight. At the ball, Cinderella meets the prince, who instantly falls in love with her. They dance and enjoy the evening until the clock strikes twelve, and Cinderella flees, leaving behind a glass slipper.

Meanwhile, Cinderella's stepmother demands a royal title for herself, and the stepsisters attend a concert by their favorite troubadour. The next day, longing to find Cinderella, the prince convinces the king to travel through the towns to find the girl who fits the glass slipper. Eventually, they arrive at Cinderella’s home, where the stepsisters and stepmother, pushing Cinderella aside, try on the slipper, but it doesn’t fit. Cinderella then tries on the glass slipper and reveals the matching pair. Recognizing her, the prince brings Cinderella to the palace, where they celebrate their wedding.

== Cast ==
- Yulia Mavrina as Cinderella
- Nikolay Baskov as The Prince
- Valery Leontiev as The King
- Valery Meladze as Cinderella's Father
- Lolita Milyavskaya as Stepmother
- Andrey Danilko as Brunhilda - First Wicked Stepsister
- Inna Belokon (Yeryomenko) as Dafna - Second Wicked Stepsister
- Vladimir Goryansky as Court Astrologer
- Vitaly Linetsky as Court Doctor
- Larisa Dolina as Godmother
- Taisia Povaliy as Matchmaker
- Oleh Skrypka as Troubadour
- Olha Sumska as The Duchess
- Georgy Drozd as Major-domo
- Nu Virgos:
  - Alena Vinnitskaya as Scandinavian Princess
  - Nadia Meiher as Japanese Princess
  - Anna Sedokova as English Princess
- Yevhen Paperny as Owl (voice)

== Camera crew ==
- Director: Semen Horov
- Screenwriter: Anton Fridlyand
- Producers: Aleksandr Faifman, Vladyslav Ryashin
- Cameraman: Alexey Stepanov
- Composer: Konstantin Meladze
- Artist: Mikhail Levchenko
