= Konstantin Khabensky =

Russian actor and director (born 1972)

- Константин Хабенский
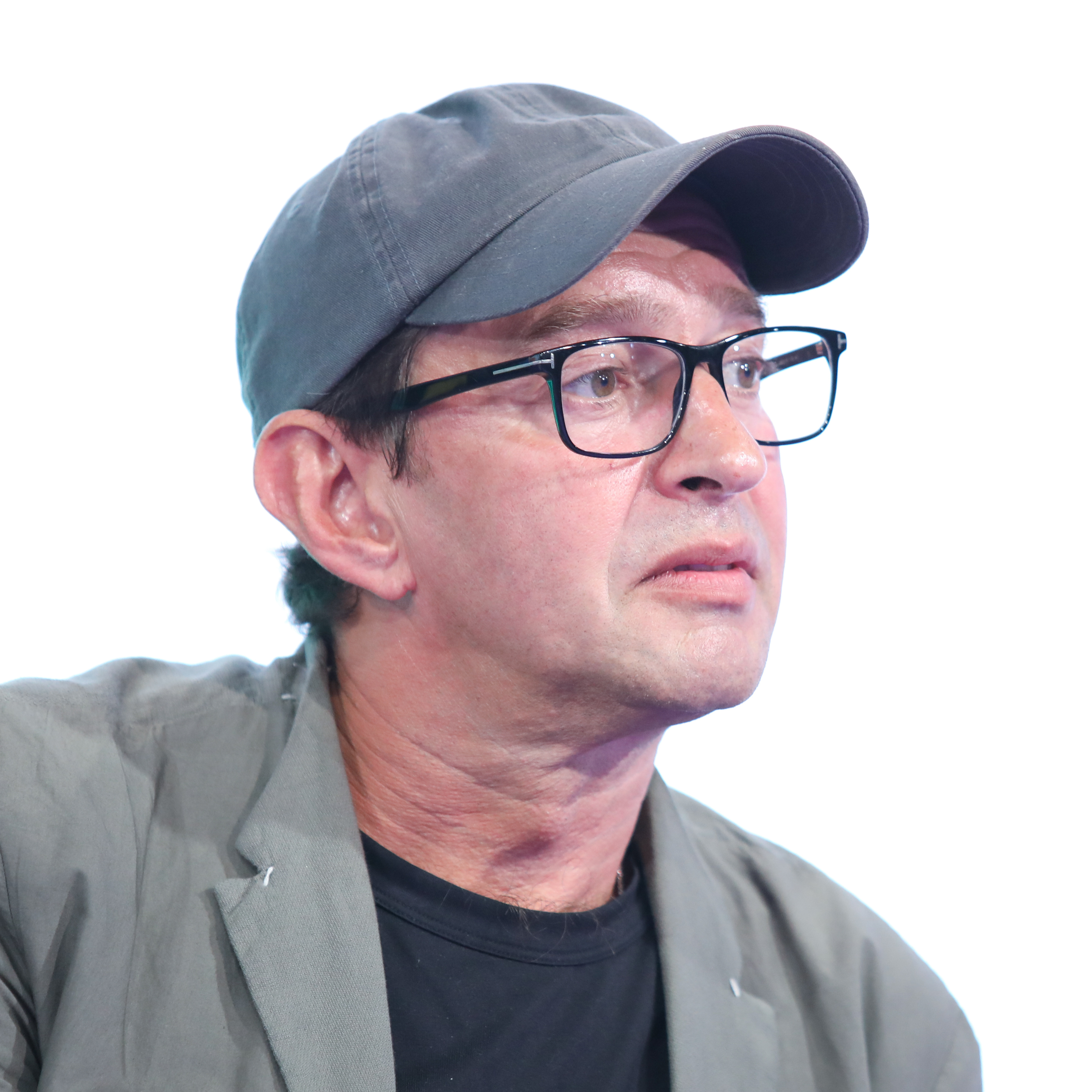
- Khabensky in 2022
- Born: Konstantin Yurievich Khabensky; 11 January 1972 (age 54); Leningrad, Russian SFSR, Soviet Union
- Occupations: Actor; director; philanthropist
- Years active: 1994–present
- Works: Filmography
- Title: People's Artist of Russia (2012)
- Spouses: Anastasiya Khabenskaya (m. 2000; died 2008) Olga Litvinova (m. 2013)
- Children: 2
- Awards: Full list
- Website: Official website; Konstantin Khabensky Foundation

Konstantin Yurievich Khabensky, PAR (Russian: Константин Юрьевич Хабенский; born 11 January 1972) is a Russian actor of stage and film, director and philanthropist.

From 1997, he was part of the Saint Petersburg Lensoviet Theatre cast until 2000, after which he transferred to the Moscow Art Theatre in 2002 where he is still active. Khabensky's first lead roles in cinema were in Women's Property (1999) and in the film In Motion (2002). Among the Russian audience, he gained recognition with the TV series Deadly Force (2002-2005), while his international breakthrough came with the films Night Watch (2004) and Day Watch (2006) as the protagonist, Anton Gorodetsky.

Other notable films with him in the lead role include Poor Relatives (2005), The Irony of Fate 2 (2007), Collector (2016), TV series Pyotr Leschenko. Everything That Was... (2013), The Method (2015) and Trotsky (2017).

One of the most acclaimed actors in Russia, Khabensky has earned numerous awards, including two Nika Awards for The Admiral (2008) and The Geographer Drank His Globe Away (2013). He has also won three Golden Eagle Awards for Best Actor, three Kinotavr Awards and the Russian Guild of Film Critics Award.

Based on the data of the website KinoPoisk, Konstantin Khabensky was declared to be the most popular actor in Russia in the first 15 years of the 21st century.

Khabensky made his directorial debut in 2018 with the Holocaust drama Sobibor, where he also played the role of Alexander Pechersky.

Alongside his work in cinema, Khabensky is a philanthropist, in 2008 he established the Konstantin Khabensky Charitable Foundation which provides assistance to children with oncological and other serious brain afflictions.

== Early life ==
Khabensky was born in Leningrad (now Saint Petersburg) to Russian Jewish father, Yuri Aronovich Khabensky and Russian mother, Tatiana Gennadievna Khabenskaya (née Nikulina). Both of his parents were engineers. His mother also worked as a mathematics teacher. He has an older sister, Natalia Khabenskaya.

In 1981, he together with his family moved to Nizhnevartovsk, where Konstantin lived over the period of four years. In 1985 the family returned to Leningrad. After finishing eight classes of secondary school No. 486, Konstantin entered the Technical College of Aviation Instrument Engineering and Automation, but after studying there for three years, he realized that this profession was not for him. He tried many jobs including as a janitor, cleaner, street musician, and then was hired as a lighting technician at the theatre studio "Subbota" where he later performed for the first time. In 1990 Khabensky entered the Leningrad State Institute of Theatre, Music and Cinema (course of Veniamin Filshtinsky), where his classmates were Mikhail Porechenkov, Andrei Zibrov and Mikhail Trukhin. For the final exam, Konstantin performed as Estragon in the play Waiting for Godot by Samuel Beckett, his graduation was in 1995.

== Career ==
=== Early roles (1994–2003) ===
Khabensky's cinematic debut was in the 1994 comedy film To whom will God send where he appeared in a minor role of a pedestrian.

In 1995, after graduating from the Russian State Institute of Performing Arts, Konstantin worked at the Perekriostok Experimental Theater where he served for one year. At the same time he acted in the Lensoviet Theatre in Saint Petersburg.

Konstantin Khabensky moved to Moscow in 1996 to become a stage actor in Satyricon Theatre where he performed in background roles. He worked there for only a few months and returned to the Saint Petersburg Lensoviet Theatre.

Between 1995 and 1996, he worked as a presenter of regional TV in the department of music and information programs.

In 1998, he acted in three pictures at once. In the satiric romantic drama directed by Dmitry Meskhiev, Women's Property, Khabensky played the lead role of Andrei Kalinin, a young aspiring actor who decides to seduce the aging actress and professor of a teaching institute Elizaveta Kaminskaya, played by Yelena Safonova. For the role he received the Best Male Actor award at the Gatchina Literature and Cinema Film Festival. Khabensky also starred in the Russian-Hungarian criminal fantasy melodrama of Tomas Toth, Natasha and had an uncredited role of a musician in the social drama of Aleksei German, Khrustalyov, My Car!

The actor said that he got his first roles by chance. The role in Natasha went to the actor after a meeting with the Hungarian director Tomas Toth. "We talked, recalls Konstantin, he asked: "Will you act?" - I said: "I will!" Then we drank vodka. And so began work in the cinema." He was cast in the picture Women's Property in a similar way. The actor recalls: "I go downstairs to the studio, some man rises up, comes across and looks at me: "Somehow I do not know you!" - I answer: "I do not know you either!" - and we parted. And then people came up to me and said that it was director Dima Meskhiev and that I was approved for the role in his new film Women's Property.

The following year, Konstantin played a small role in Nikolai Lebedev's thriller The Admirer (1999). The next notable work in the cinema was the main role in the drama of Vladimir Fokin's House for the Rich (2000). Next year he played in another film by Dmitry Meskhiev, comedy-drama Mechanical Suite.

Khabensky received wide recognition among Russian television viewers after he was cast as investigator Igor Plakhov in the crime procedural comedy-drama series Deadly Force (2000-2005).

Another important role was of Sasha Guriev in the picture In Motion (2002), the directorial debut of Filipp Yankovsky. The film was about a successful and charming journalist who suddenly realizes that he has found compromising evidence on his politician friend. For the role he received the Best Male Actor award at the Vivat, Russian Cinema festival.

In 2003, he played musician Kostya, similar in looks to John Lennon, in the television series Lines of Fate directed by Dmitry Meskhiev. In the same year, he had the supporting role of journalist Gosha in comedy Peculiarities of National Politics, also by the aforementioned director.

Since 2003, Khabensky has been a member of Moscow Art Theatre stage cast, and a lead actor in Alexander Vampilov's Duck Hunting (Zilov), Mikhail Bulgakov's The White Guard (Alexey Turbin) and Hamlet (Claudius).

=== Night Watch and breakthrough ===
After starring as magician Anton Gorodetsky in the blockbuster fantasy films Night Watch (2004) and Day Watch (2005) directed by Timur Bekmambetov, Khabensky became famous worldwide. The films are about the struggle between respective supernatural forces that control daytime and nighttime – Light Others and Dark Others. Both films became box office successes, with the duology grossing $73 million internationally. Bekmambetov described that he needed an actor for the role of Gorodetsky who was handsome, slightly naive, slightly cunning and that "his eyes must show that he has a conscience". The character of the film Anton Gorodetsky became one of his most well-known roles and the success of these films in Russia and abroad has made Khabensky one of the best-known Russian actors in the West.

Khabensky reunited with Meskhiev for the fifth time in Our Own (2004), a World War II drama film where he played political commissar Livshitz. In the same year he also had a supporting role in Goddess: How I fell in Love by Renata Litvinova.

In 2005, he played in Filipp Yankovsky's historical mystery film The State Counsellor, adaptation of the novel of the same name by Boris Akunin. His character in the film was Green (Grigory Grinberg), a revolutionary who attempts to murder the governor of Moscow. For this role, he received his first Golden Eagle Award, as best supporting actor.

In the same year, he acted in two works by Pavel Lungin — comedy film Poor Relatives about a grifter and TV miniseries The Case of "Dead Souls" loosely based on various stories by Nikolai Gogol, including Dead Souls. Leslie Felperin from Variety wrote in her review of Poor Relatives — "Although largely an ensemble piece, thesp Khabensky, a ubiquitous presence in Russian films these days, steals the show with his shambling, sleazeball Letov, demonstrating excellent, previously underexposed comic timing as well as a knack for deadpan and slapstick." Khabensky received the Best Male Actor award from Kinotavr and Russian Guild of Film Critics (Golden Aries).

Khabensky had a supporting role as Leon Trotsky in the miniseries Yesenin, which told the conspiracy version of the death of the Russian poet Sergei Yesenin, played by Sergei Bezrukov. Konstantin would later revisit the character in the 2018 biographical series. Also in 2005, Khabensky appeared in the television series The Fall of the Empire and Female Novel.

In 2006, the actor starred in the film Rush Hour directed by Oleg Fesenko and based on the novel by Jerzy Stawiński. In the same year aired the television series Filipp's Bay, in which Khabensky was filmed in parallel with the shooting of Day Watch.

In 2007, Khabensky played Kostya Lukashin opposite Elizaveta Boyarskaya in Timur Bekmambetov's the romantic-comedy The Irony of Fate 2, sequel to 1976 Soviet classic The Irony of Fate. Its plot centered around the grown-up children of Evgeniy Lukashin and Nadezhda Sheveleva who have managed to get into the same situation as their parents many years ago. The film made $55 million against a $5 million budget, with $49 million coming from the Russian box-office alone. For the film he earned the Best Comedy Actor prize at the MTV Russia Movie Awards.

Also in 2007, he appeared as Denis Maltsev in thriller The Russian Triangle by Aleko Tsabadze which was about two brothers who survive brutal torture and Chechen captivity.

In 2008, Khabensky reunited with Elizaveta Boyarskaya to film the 2008 biographical movie The Admiral by Andrei Kravchuk. He portrayed Alexander Kolchak, vice-admiral in the Imperial Russian Navy and leader of the anti-communist White Movement during the Russian Civil War. The film earned $38 million at the box-office. Khabensky was recognized as best actor at the MTV Russia Movie Awards and Golden Eagle Awards.

In the same year, he played Anton Prachenko in suspense film The Ghost by Karen Oganesyan. The picture was about a crime novelist in a creative crisis who becomes an unwitting witness to a murder and whose fate becomes linked with the hired killer who committed it, played by Vladimir Mashkov.

=== 2009–2014 ===
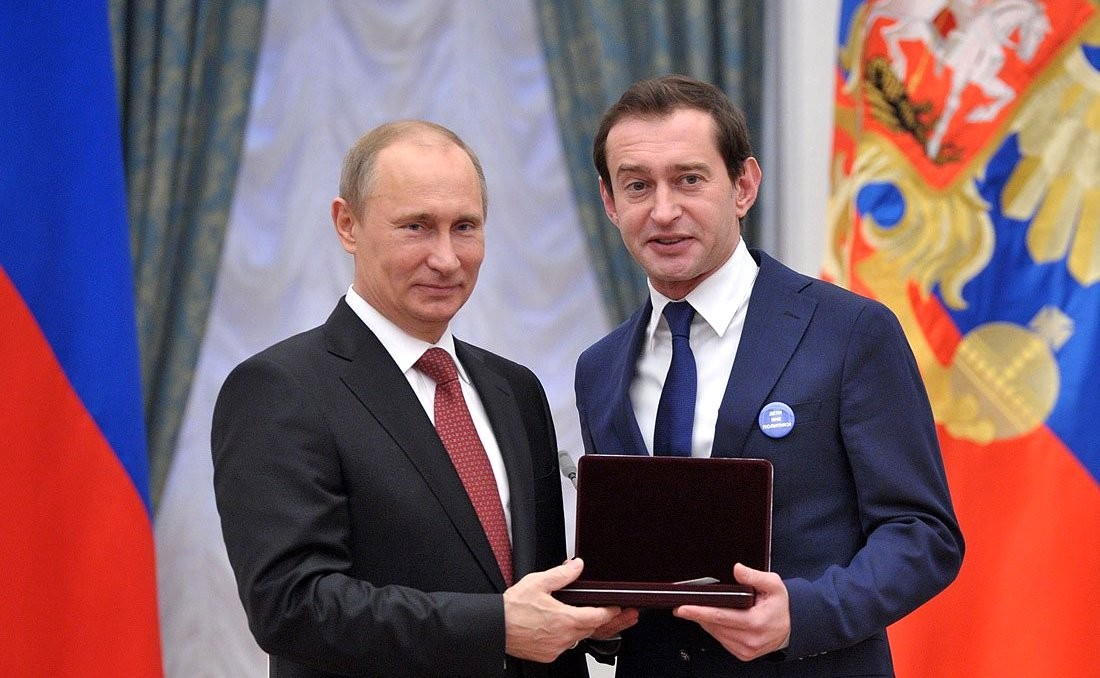
Konstantin Khabensky being awarded the title People's Artist of Russia in 2012 by President Vladimir Putin

Khabensky appeared in the 2009 mystical drama The Miracle by Aleksandr Proshkin. The film was inspired by the urban legend of Zoya, who after dancing with an icon of Saint Nicholas became paralyzed.

In 2010, he played Vyacheslav Kolotilov in the comedy Lucky Trouble which co-starred Milla Jovovich and was directed by Levan Gabriadze. The film was about a school teacher traveling to Moscow to get married but who on his way there is mistaken for a football coach which puts him in danger of missing his own wedding.

In the supernatural courtroom drama series Heavenly Court made in 2011, he played the character of Andrei who dies and becomes a prosecutor in the afterlife. He also appeared in the children's film Fairytale.Is and the historical picture Raspoutine during the same year.

The following year, he played the role of Alexei Turbin in the miniseries The White Guard, based on the novel of the same name by Mikhail Bulgakov.

Konstantin played an alcoholic geography teacher Victor Sluzhkin in the 2013 adventure drama The Geographer Drank His Globe Away directed by Alexander Veledinsky. It was based on the eponymous novel by Alexei Ivanov. His acting received considerable praise in Russia and abroad. Ronnie Scheib from Variety wrote that "thanks to Konstantin Khabensky’s charismatic, sardonic performance as Victor, even personal deterioration proves fascinating and consistently entertaining". Khabensky won the Best Actor prize at Kinotavr, Russian Guild of Film Critics Awards, Nika Awards and the Golden Eagle Awards.

In the same year, he portrayed singer Pyotr Leschenko in the biographical musical television series Pyotr Leschenko. Everything That Was.... Konstantin Khabensky took singing classes to prepare for the shooting, and performed all the songs himself in the series.

He starred opposite Svetlana Khodchenkova in the 2014 movie The Adventurers about underwater diving treasure hunters. Konstantin Khabensky did scuba diving for many years, but during one scene his gas cylinder was not filled with air by crew members which caused the actor to almost drown.

Also in 2014, Khabensky appeared as an officer of the Tsarist army in Yolki 1914. The picture was part of the comedy anthology film series Yolki, where he has served as narrator in all installments.

=== 2015–present ===
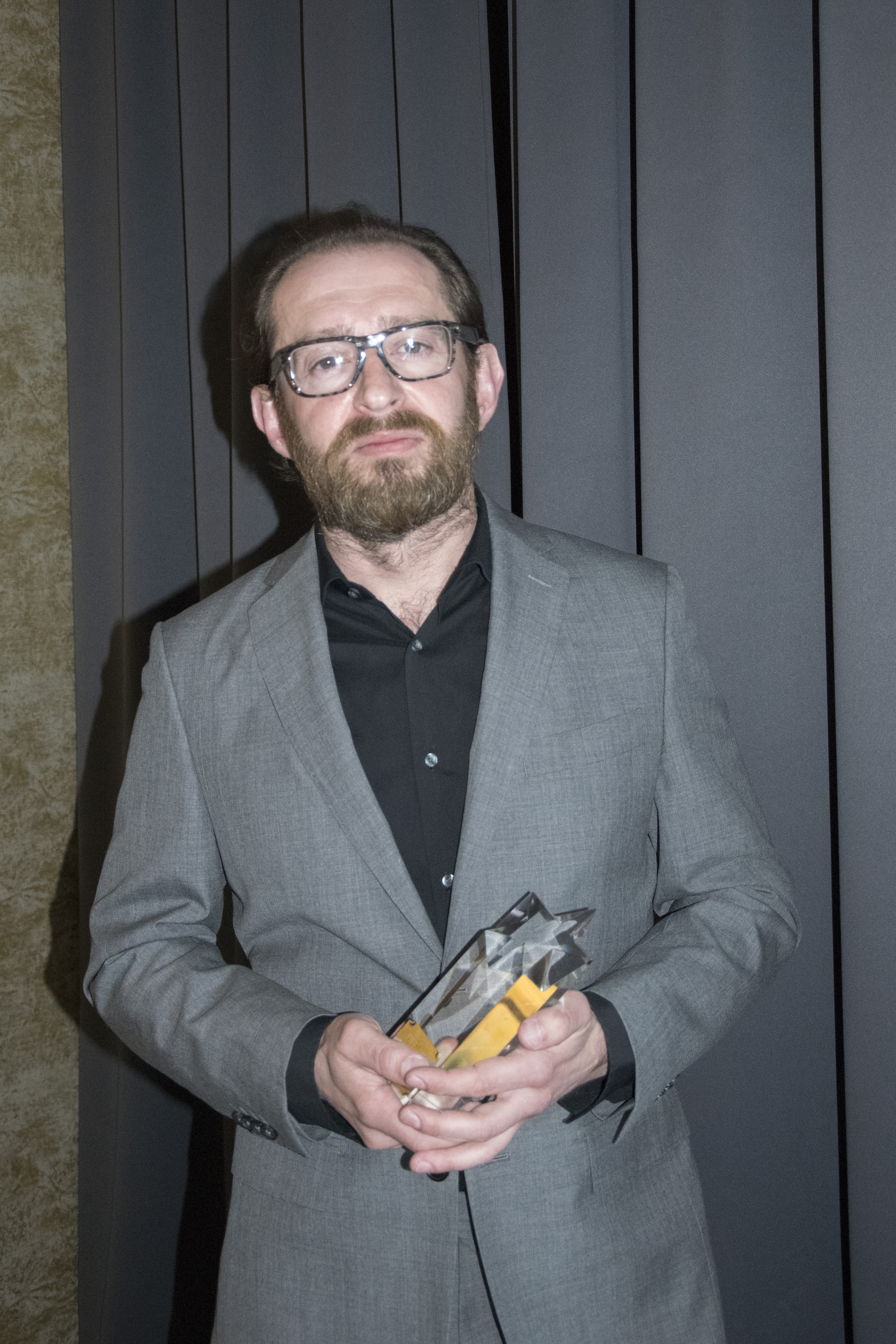
Konstantin Khabensky receiving an honorary award for achievements in cinema in 2018, Prague

In 2015, Khabensky was cast as police investigator Rodion Meglin who doubles as a vigilante in the crime drama series The Method directed by Yuri Bykov and produced by Sreda. For the role he received the TEFI award as best actor of a television series.

In 2016, he played an employee of a collecting firm in the thriller Collector directed by Alexey Krasovsky where he was the only actor on screen. Russian edition of The Hollywood Reporter described the film as "a brilliant solo performance with one of the best Russian actors of our time". For the film he received the Best Actor award at Kinotavr and at the Prague Independent Film Festival.

In the same year, he did a turn as the protagonist's eccentric father in the teen comedy The Good Boy by Oksana Karas. He also appeared in the Austrian film Fly Away Home, based on the biographical novel of the same name by Christine Nöstlinger. For the German-speaking role of Cohn, he had to learn his lines phonetically.

In 2017, Khabensky played the role of fighter pilot Pavel Belyayev opposite Yevgeny Mironov in the historical drama film The Age of Pioneers about the first spacewalk, directed by Dmitriy Kiselev.

Konstantin starred in another Sreda production in 2018 – he portrayed revolutionary Leon Trotsky in the biographical miniseries Trotsky, directed by Alexander Kott and Konstantin Statsky. For the role he received the Best Male Actor award from the Association of Film and Television Producers in Russia.

Also in 2018, he starred in a dual role in Selfie, based on the novel Soulless of the 21st century. Selfie by Sergey Minaev. The film tells the story of a popular writer and TV presenter Vladimir Bogdanov who is suddenly replaced with an absolute double.

Konstantin Khabensky's directorial debut Sobibor, where he also plays the lead role of Alexander Pechersky was released in 2018. The film is a World War II drama about the only successful uprising in a Nazi death camp. It also stars Christopher Lambert. The film was selected in 2018 as the Russian entry for the Best Foreign Language Film at the 91st Academy Awards.

=== Hollywood roles ===
He took part in several Western film such as Wanted (2008), Tinker Tailor Soldier Spy (2011), World War Z (2013) and Black Sea (2014).

In World War Z, Konstantin's role as Russian soldier was cut due to re-shooting of the 30 Minutes of the ending.

Khabensky has admitted that the language barrier stopped him from taking on serious roles in Hollywood.

== Personal life ==
Konstantin Khabensky was married to radio-journalist Anastasiya Khabenskaya from 12 January 2000, until her death at age 33 from a brain tumor on 3 December 2008. He has one son by her, Ivan, who was born in Moscow on 25 September 2007. In Russia, he lives in Moscow and St. Petersburg. In 2013 Khabensky married actress Olga Litvinova and on 3 June 2016, she gave birth to their daughter.

He avoids discussing his personal life and has said that he does not see the need to demonstrate it to the press.

In March 2022, he condemned the Russian invasion of Ukraine.

== Philanthropy ==
In 2008, he established the Konstantin Khabensky Charitable Foundation (Russian: Благотворительный Фонд Константина Хабенского, romanized: Blagotvoritelny Fond Konstantina Khabenskogo) which provides assistance to children with oncological and other serious brain afflictions.

Since 2010, Khabensky has been opening non-profit studios of creative development throughout Russia. Once a year, Konstantin conducts a festival with all participants of the studios under the name "Operenie".

== In the media ==
GQ Russia magazine chose him as Actor of the Year in 2003 and 2016.

In 2017, the Russian Public Opinion Research Center named Khabensky together with Sergei Bezrukov, as the most popular actor in Russia.

According to the detailed analytical review of Russian cinema by Yandex in 2017 based on the data of the website KinoPoisk, Konstantin Khabensky was declared to be the most popular actor in Russia in the first 15 years of the 21st century.

For a number of years, he was cited as a sex symbol by various media outlets in Russia.

== Awards and nominations ==
Award	Year	Category	Nominated work	Result
Saint-Petersburg Independent Actor Award named after Vladislav Strzhelchik	1999	"Actors' Ensemble" (together with Mikhail Porechenkov, Mikhail Trukhin and Andrei Zibrov)	Waiting for Godot (staged by Yuri Butusov at the Lensoviet Theater)	Won
Gatchina Literature and Cinema Film Festival	1999	Best Actor	Women's Property	Won
XI Festival "Vivat, Russian Cinema"	2002	Best Actor	In Motion	Won
GQ Russia	2003	Actor of the Year	—N/a	Won
Kinotavr	2005	Best Actor	Poor Relatives	Won
Golden Aries	2005	Best Actor	Poor Relatives	Won
Theatrical Award "Seagull"	2005	Best Performer of the Antagonist Role	Hamlet (staged by Yuri Butusov for the Moscow Art Theater)	Won
Golden Eagle Award	2005	Best Supporting Actor	The State Counsellor	Won
The Stanislavsky Prize (theatrical season 2006–2007) at the 12th International Stanislavsky Theater Festival in Moscow	2007	"Mastery of an Actor" ("Best Actor")	"For the Totality of Merits" in the Moscow Art Theater	Won
MTV Russia Movie Awards	2008	Best Comedy Actor	The Irony of Fate 2	Won
VI International Festival named after People's Artist of the USSR Yuri Ozerov	2008	Golden Sword	The Admiral	Won
Nika Award	2008	Best Male Actor	The Admiral	Nominated
Golden Eagle	2008	Best Male Actor	The Admiral	Won
MTV Russia Movie Awards	2008	Best Male Actor	The Admiral	Won
Kinotavr	2013	Best Male Actor	The Geographer Drank His Globe Away	Won
Golden Eagle Award	2013	Best Male Actor	The Geographer Drank His Globe Away	Won
Nika Award	2013	Best Male Actor	The Geographer Drank His Globe Away	Won
Russian Guild of Film Critics	2013	Best Male Actor	The Geographer Drank His Globe Away	Won
XXII Festival "Vivat, Cinema of Russia!"	2013	Special Jury Prize	The Geographer Drank His Globe Away	Won
The Stanislavsky Prize (theatrical season 2013–2014) at the XIX International Theater Festival "Stanislavsky Season" in Moscow	2014	Special Prize	The charity theater project "Generation of Mowgli" (MTS Company together with the Charitable Foundation of Konstantin Khabensky)	Won
The "Impulse of Good" Award	2016	Special Prize "for contribution to the development and promotion of social entrepreneurship in Russia"	The charity theater project "Generation of Mowgli" (MTS Company together with the Charitable Foundation of Konstantin Khabensky)	Won
GQ Russia	2016	Actor of the Year	—N/a	Won
TEFI	2016	Best Male Actor	The Method	Won
Golden Eagle Award	2016	Best Male Actor	Collector	Nominated
Kinotavr	2016	Best Male Actor	Collector	Won
Prague Independent Film Festival	2017	Best Male Actor	Collector	Won
Association of Film and Television Producers	2018	Best Male Actor	Trotsky	Won
Prague Independent Film Festival	2018	Special Prize	Honorary award for achievements in cinema	Won
Asian World Film Festival	2018	Best New Director	Sobibor	Won
Vienna Independent Film Festival	2019	Best Male Supporting Actor	Dark like the Night. Karenina-2019	Won

In 2018 he was awarded the Fiddler on the Roof Award in the Film category.

== Filmography ==
=== Film ===
Year	Title	Role	Notes	Ref.
1994	To whom will God send	pedestrian with glasses		
1997	Natasha	Ferenc, a student		
1997	Khrustalyov, My Car!	the conductor		
1999	The Admirer	Stas		
1999	Women's Property	Andrei Kalinin		
2000	House for the Rich	Yuri Sapozhnikov		
2001	Mechanical Suite	Edouard		
2001	The Tale of Fedot-Archer	the peasant-accordionist		
2002	In Motion	Sasha		
2003	Peculiarities of National Politics	Gosha		
2004	Goddess: How I fell in Love	Polosuev		
2004	Our Own	Political Instructor Livshits		
2004	Night Watch	Anton Gorodetsky		
2005	The State Counsellor	Green		
2005	Poor Relatives	Edik		
2006	Rush Hour	Konstantin Arkhipov		
2006	Day Watch	Anton Gorodetsky		
2007	The Russian Triangle	Denis Maltsev		
2008	The Irony of Fate 2	Kostya Lukashin		
2008	Wanted	The Exterminator		
2008	The Ghost	Anton Prachenko		
2008	Admiral	Admiral Alexander Kolchak		
2009	The Miracle	Nikolay Artemyev		
2011	Fairytale.Is	Encyclopedia		
2011	Raspoutine	Aron Simanovic		
2011	Lucky Trouble	Vyacheslav "Slava" Kolotilov		
2011	Tinker Tailor Soldier Spy	Polyakov		
2013	The Geographer Drank His Globe Away	Viktor Sluzhkin, the geography teacher		
2013	World War Z	Russian fighter	Cut from the final version	
2014	Black Sea	Blackie		
2014	Unfriended	Officer	Uncredited	
2014	Yolki 1914	officer of the tsarist army		
2014	The Adventurers	Max		
2016	Collector	Arthur		
2016	The Good Boy	Kolya's father		
2016	Fly Away Home	Cohn		
2017	The Age of Pioneers	Pavel Belyayev		
2018	Selfie	Vladimir Bogdanov		
2018	Sobibor	Alexander Pechersky	Also director and writer	
2019	Fairy	Evgeniy Voygin		
2020	Fire	Andrey Pavlovich Sokolov		
2021	Major Grom: Plague Doctor	Dr Veniamin Rubinstein, psychiatrist		
2021	Normalny tolko ya	Viktor Ryurikovich		
2021	Champion of the World	Viktor Korchnoi		
2022	Grom: Boyhood	Dr Veniamin Rubinstein, psychiatrist		
2023	The Righteous	Avigdor		
2024	The Bremen Town Musicians	the Detective		
2024	Guest from the Future	Professor Seleznev		
2024	Major Grom: The Game	Dr Veniamin Rubinstein, psychiatrist		
2025	Yura Was Here	Yura		
2026	Buratino	Professor Owl		

=== Television ===
Year	Title	Role	Network	Notes	Ref.
2000	National Security Agent	Rashid	TNT	2 episodes	
2000	Empire under Attack	Grigory Gershuni	C1R	6 episodes	
2000-2005	Deadly Force	Igor Plakhov	C1R	6 seasons	
2003	Lines of Fate	Kostya	RTR	24 episodes	
2005	The Case of "Dead Souls"	Chichikov	NTV	8 episodes	
2005	Female Novel	Kirill	C1R		
2005	Yesenin	Leon Trotsky	C1R	5 episodes	
2005	The Fall of the Empire	Boris Lozovsky	RTR	Episode: "Japanese wood pigeon"	
2006	Filipp's Bay	Filipp Ronin	RTR	8 episodes	
2011–2014	Heavenly Court	Andrei	STB	8 Episodes	
2012	The White Guard	Dr. Turbin	RTR	12 Episodes	
2013	Pyotr Leschenko. Everything That Was...	Pyotr Leshchenko	C1R	8 Episodes	
2014–present	Evenings of Science with Konstantin Khabensky	Host	Discovery Channel		
2015–2021	The Method	Rodion Meglin	C1R	32 episodes	
2017	Trotsky	Leon Trotsky	C1R	8 episodes	
2021	An Hour Before Dawn	Major Sergey Shumeyko ("Satan")	NTV	16 episodes	

== Voice roles ==
=== Russian dubbing ===
- 1995–1998 – Timon & Pumbaa as Timon
- 1999 – Bringing Out the Dead as Noel
- 2000 – Final Destination as Carter Horton
- 2002 – The Cuckoo as Veikko
- 2005, 2008, 2012 – Madagascar 1, 2, 3 as Alex
- 2009 – 9 as 9, scientist
- 2015 – Hardcore Henry as Slick Dmitry
- 2015 – The Little Prince as Fox
- 2016 – Voyage of Time as narrator
- 2017 – Loving Vincent as Dr. Gachet
- 2002 – ChalkZone as Narrator

=== Russian language films ===
- 2010, 2011, 2013, 2014, 2016, 2017 – Christmas Trees 1, 2, 3, 1914, 5, 6 – narrator
- 2015 – A Warrior's Tail as Anggee
- 2017 – Fantastic Journey to OZ as Urfin Jus
- 2017 – Kikoriki as father

== Discography ==
=== Soundtracks ===
Year	Song	with	Movie
2007	"Esli u vas netu tyoti"		The Irony of Fate 2
2011	"Prostitsa"	Uma2rman	Lucky Trouble
2013			Pyotr Leschenko. Everything That Was...

=== Songs ===
Year	Song
2012	"Dom khrustalniy" (Vladimir Vysotsky)
2012	"Moskva – Odesa" (Vladimir Vysotsky)

== Theater work ==
=== Theater on the Kryukov Channel ===
- The Road based on the script of Federico Fellini (student work) - rope walker Matto
- Jokes of Chekhov (student work); director Veniamin Filshtinsky - "Lomov"
- Three Sisters by Anton Chekhov (student work); director Veniamin Filshtinsky - Chebutykin
- 1994 - Vysotsky's Time (student work); director Veniamin Filshtinsky - several roles
- 1996 - Waiting for Godot by Samuel Beckett; director Yuri Butusov - Estragon

=== Satyricon Theater ===
At the Satyricon Theater named after Arkady Raikin

- 1996 - The Threepenny Opera by Bertold Brecht; director Vladimir Mashkov
- 1996 - Cyrano de Bergerac by Edmond Rostand

=== Theater of Farce ===
- 1998 - Hamlet by William Shakespeare; director Victor Kramer - Horatio

=== Lensovet Theater ===
At the Lensovet Theater in St Petersburg:

- 1997 - Woyzeck by Georg Büchner; director Yuri Butusov - Karl the fool
- 1997 - Waiting for Godot by Samuel Beckett; director Yuri Butusov - Estragon
- 1997 - King, Queen, Knave by Vladimir Nabokov; director Vladislav Pazi - mannequin / waiter / sanitary officer
- 1998 - Caligula by Albert Camus; director Yuri Butusov - Caligula
- 1998 - Brother Rabbit in the Wild West based on the play by Eduard Gaidai; director Vladislav Pazi - Brother Opossum
- 2000 - The Bedbug by Vladimir Mayakovsky, director Yuri Butusov
- 2000 - You Never Can Tell by George Bernard Shaw; director Vladislav Pazi - Valentine

=== Entreprise ===
- 2001 - The Death of Tarelkin by Aleksandr Sukhovo-Kobylin; director Yuri Butusov - Varravin

=== Moscow Art Theater ===
At the Moscow Art Theater named after Anton Chekhov:

- 2002 - Duck Hunting by Alexander Vampilov; director Alexander Marin) - Zilov
- 2004 - The White Guard by Mikhail Bulgakov; director Sergei Zhenovach) - Alexei Turbin
- 2005 - Hamlet by William Shakespeare; director Yuri Butusov - Claudius
- 2009 - The Threepenny Opera by Bertold Brecht; director Kirill Serebrennikov - Mack the Knife
- 2014 - Der Kontrabaß by Patrick Süskind; director Gleb Cherepanov - one-man play

=== Musical Literary Projects ===
- 2011 - Joint project of Konstantin Khabensky with Yuri Bashmet
- 2016 - Do not Abandon your Planet, play based on The Little Prince by Antoine de Saint-Exupéry, together with Yuri Bashmet; director Victor Kramer
