= Sentimental Journey: Pop Vocal Classics =

Compilation album by Various artists
- Released: 1993
- Label: Rhino

Sentimental Journey: Pop Vocal Classics is a four-CD album issued by Rhino Records in 1993.

AllMusic rated the volume one of the album five stars.

== Track listing ==
=== Volume 1 (1942 - 1946) ===
Track	Title	Artist	Songwriter(s)
1	Sentimental Journey	Doris Day	Les Brown/Ben Homer/Bud Green
2	Swinging On A Star	Bing Crosby	Jimmy Van Heusen/Johnny Burke
3	You'll Never Know	Dick Haymes & The Song Spinners	Harry Warren/Mack Gordon
4	The Gypsy	Dinah Shore	Billy Reid
5	Paper Doll	Mills Brothers	Johnny S. Black
6	Doctor, Lawyer, Indian Chief	Betty Hutton	Hoagy Carmichael/Paul Francis Webster
7	Laura	Woody Herman & His Orchestra	David Raksin/Johnny Mercer
8	A Cottage For Sale	Billy Eckstine & His Orchestra	Willard Robison/Larry Conley
9	The Trolley Song	Judy Garland	Hugh Martin/Ralph Blane
10	I've Heard That Song Before	Helen Forrest	Jule Styne/Sammy Cahn
11	There! I've Said It Again	Vaughn Monroe & His Orchestra	Redd Evans/Dave Mann
12	My Ideal	Margaret Whiting	Leo Robin/Newell Chase/Richard A. Whiting
13	I'll Walk Alone	Martha Tilton	Jule Styne/Sammy Cahn
14	Candy	Johnny Mercer/Jo Stafford/The Pied Pipers	Alex Kramer/Mack David/Joan Whitney
15	Amor	Andy Russell	Gabriel Ruiz/Ricardo Lopez Mendez/Sunny Skylar
16	Stormy Weather	Lena Horne	Harold Arlen/Ted Koehler
17	Night and Day	Frank Sinatra	Cole Porter
18	I'm Lost	King Cole Trio	Otis René

=== Volume 2 (1947 - 1950) ===
Track	Title	Artist	Songwriter(s)
1	Far Away Places	Bing Crosby	Alex Kramer/Joan Whitney
2	Mañana (Is Soon Enough for Me)	Peggy Lee	Peggy Lee/Dave Barbour
3	Love Somebody	Doris Day/Buddy Clark	Alex Kramer/Joan Whitney
4	Buttons And Bows	Dinah Shore & Her Happy Valley Boys	Jay Livingston/Ray Evans
5	Riders In The Sky (A Cowboy Legend)	Vaughn Monroe & His Orchestra	Stan Jones
6	The Tennessee Waltz	Patti Page	Redd Stewart/Pee Wee King
7	My Foolish Heart	Billy Eckstine	Victor Young/Ned Washington
8	That's My Desire	Frankie Laine	Helmy Kresa/Carroll Loveday
9	A Little Bird Told Me	Evelyn Knight & The Stardusters	Harvey O. Brooks
10	Again	Mel Tormé	Lionel Newman/Dorcas Cochran
11	If I Knew You Were Comin' I'd've Baked A Cake	Eileen Barton	Al Hoffman/Bob Merrill/Clem Watts
12	Little White Lies	Dick Haymes	Walter Donaldson
13	It's Magic	Doris Day	Jule Styne/Sammy Cahn
14	A Tree In The Meadow	Margaret Whiting	Billy Reid
15	Goodnight, Irene	Gordon Jenkins & His Orchestra/The Weavers	Gussie L. Davis/John Lomax/Alan Lomax
16	Music! Music! Music!	Teresa Brewer	Stephen Weiss/Bernie Baum
17	Mam'selle	Art Lund	Edmund Goulding/Mack Gordon
18	Linda	Buddy Clark	Jack Lawrence

=== Volume 3 (1950 - 1954) ===
Track	Title	Artist	Songwriter(s)
1	Because Of You	Tony Bennett	Arthur Hammerstein/Dudley Wilkinson
2	Cry	Johnnie Ray & The Four Lads	Churchill Kohlman
3	Lover	Peggy Lee/Gordon Jenkins & His Orchestra	Richard Rodgers/Lorenz Hart
4	Come On-A My House	Rosemary Clooney	Ross Bagdasarian/William Saroyan
5	Kiss Of Fire	Georgia Gibbs	Lester Allen/Robert Hill
6	I Apologize	Billy Eckstine	Al Hoffman/Al Goodhart
7	The Song From Moulin Rouge (Where Is Your Heart)	Percy Faith & His Orchestra	Georges Auric/Jacques Larue/William Engvick
8	You Belong To Me	Jo Stafford	credited to Pee Wee King/Redd Stewart/Chilton Price; actually by Price alone
9	Wheel Of Fortune	Kay Starr	Bennie Benjamin/George David Weiss
10	I Get Ideas	Tony Martin	Julio Cesar Sanders/Cesar Felipe Vedani/Dorcas Cochran
11	Little Things Mean a Lot	Kitty Kallen	Edith Lindeman/Carl Stutz
12	That's Amore	Dean Martin	Harry Warren/Jack Brooks
13	Here in My Heart	Al Martino	Pat Genaro/Lou Levinson/Bill Borrelli
14	How High The Moon	Les Paul & Mary Ford	Nancy Hamilton/Morgan Lewis
15	Hold My Hand	Don Cornell	Jack Lawrence/Richard Myers
16	(Why Did I Tell You I Was Going To) Shanghai	Doris Day	Bob Hilliard/Milton De Lugg
17	My Heart Cries For You	Guy Mitchell	Carl Sigman/Percy Faith
18	Wish You Were Here	Eddie Fisher	Harold Rome

=== Volume 4 (1954 - 1959) ===
Track	Title	Artist	Songwriter(s)
1	Mack The Knife	Bobby Darin	Kurt Weill/Bertolt Brecht
2	Fever	Peggy Lee	Eddie Cooley/John Davenport
3	Tammy	Debbie Reynolds	Jay Livingston/Ray Evans
4	Let Me Go, Lover!	Joan Weber	Jenny Lou Carson/Al Hill
5	What A Difference A Day Makes	Dinah Washington	María Méndez Grever/Stanley Adams
6	On The Street Where You Live	Vic Damone	Alan Jay Lerner/Frederick Loewe
7	Singing The Blues	Guy Mitchell	Melvin Endsley
8	Chances Are	Johnny Mathis	Al Stillman/Robert Allen
9	Whatever Will Be Will Be (Que Sera, Sera)	Doris Day	Jay Livingston/Ray Evans
10	The Wayward Wind	Gogi Grant	Stan Lebowsky/Herb Newman
11	Memories Are Made Of This	Dean Martin	Terry Gilkyson/Richard Dehr/Frank Miller
12	Old Cape Cod	Patti Page	Claire Rothrock/Milton Yakus/Allan Jeffrey
13	The Man That Got Away	Judy Garland	Harold Arlen/Ira Gershwin
14	Fascination	Jane Morgan & The Troubadors	F.D. Marchetti /Dick Manning
15	I Could Have Danced All Night	Sylvia Syms	Alan Jay Lerner/Frederick Loewe
16	Just In Time	Tony Bennett	Jule Styne/Betty Comden/Adolph Green
17	That Old Black Magic	Sammy Davis Jr.	Harold Arlen/Johnny Mercer
