= Yulia Mavrina =

Russian actress

- Born: Yulia Sergeyevna Mavrina; September 10, 1984 (age 41); Feodosiya, Crimea, Soviet Union
- Occupation: actress
- Years active: 2002–present
- Spouse(s): Svyatoslav Luter (divorced, 1 child); Nikita Zverev (1 child)
- Children: 2
- Parent: Sergei Mavrin
- Website: Official website

Yulia Sergeyevna Mavrina (Russian: Юлия Серге́евна Маврина; September 10, 1984) is a Russian theater, television and film actress. She is known for the role Lilia Subbotina in the TV series Mothers and Daughters (2007).

== Biography ==
Yulia Mavrina was born in Feodosiya into the family of a serviceman. Her mother is Larisa Mavrina, a physics teacher.

Mavrina's passion for the theater has its roots in her early childhood. In the early 1990s, she, together with a partner of the studio, made of Dramatic Art in Moscow, in the TV program Morning Star. In 1997 she moved with her mother to St. Petersburg. In 1999, she entered the academy aged 14, after leaving school (completed later externally), she entered the Faculty of Dramatic Arts of the Saint Petersburg State Theatre Arts Academy (course G. Barysheva). Extremely gifted musically, she was considered a prima ballerina on her course. She played a major role in the graduation performance Mademoiselle Nitouche.

In 2002 she made her debut in the movie as Olga in Igor Maslennikov's Letters to Elsa, but first success came to Mavrina after that New Year's Eve aired the musical Cinderella, where she played a major role. Directed by Simon Gorov long chose the main character of an impressive number of contenders, but opted for an unknown student from St. Petersburg.

She is married to Russian actor Nikita Zverev (Никита Вячеславович Зверев), whom she met in Kyiv while filming. She has a daughter from a previous relationship, Alisa Zvereva (born 2005). Her mother entered her in music school at the age of 4, and aged 5 she had a role in a children's operetta. Her mother is a physicist and her father is a programmer.

== Filmography ==
- 2002 Letters to Elsa as Olga
- 2002 Cinderella as Cinderella
- 2003 Poor, Poor Pavel as Anna Lopuchina
- 2005 Destructive Power 6 (TV series) as Nikole
- 2006 Short Breath as Irina Motorina
- 2006 Game Shindal as Maria
- 2006 City without the sun as Liusi
- 2007 Mothers and Daughters (TV series) as Liliya Subbotina
- 2007 Labyrinth of Love (TV) as Svetlana Litvinova
- 2008 Two Fates. New life as Ariana
- 2008 Daughter as Masha Balashova
- 2009 Flying as Matilda
- 2009 Beauty Territory (TV series) as Ekaterina
- 2011 On the Sunny Side of the Street as Vera
- 2012 Love between Two Poles (TV) as Veronika
- 2013 Life After Life (TV) as Masha
- 2013 Photos of the Documents (TV) as Anya
