= Rasmi Djabrailov =

Russian actor and stage director (1932–2022)

- Расми Джабраилов
- Born: 8 December 1932; Kasumkent, Suleyman-Stalsky District, Dagestan ASSR, USSR
- Died: 22 January 2022 (aged 89); Moscow, Russia
- Occupations: actor, stage director
- Children: Madlen Dzhabrailova

Rasmi Khalidovich Djabrailov (Russian: Расми Халидович Джабраилов; 8 December 1932 — 22 January 2022) was a Russian actor and stage director.

== Biography ==
Rasmi Djabrailov was born on 8 December 1932.

He graduated from the actor's faculty at GITIS in 1955, then entered the director's faculty there and graduated in 1961. While studying, he worked at the S. Stalsky Lezgi Drama Theatre in Derbent.

For two years he worked in Tajikfilm as a second director. He was also director of the Dagestan Russian theatre in Makhachkala and chief director of the Dargin theatre in Izberbash.

In 1962 he began his film career, appearing in the film Possessed by Tahir Sabirov.

In 1963 he went to Tula, where he worked as a director at the Tula Academic Theatre.

Since 1964 he began working at the Taganka Theatre, where he played in Yuri Lyubimov's legendary productions of Mother, The Fallen and the Living, The Good Person of Szechwan, as well as in other productions of the theatre. In 1993 he became an artist of the Taganka Actors' Union.

He was declared an Honored Artist of the RSFSR in 1987.

In 2002 he joined the Mayakovsky Theatre, where he worked until the end of his life

Djabrailov died on 22 January 2022, at the age of 89 from COVID-19. He was buried at the Troyekurovskoye Cemetery.
