= 54th Berlin International Film Festival =

2004 film festival in Berlin, Germany

- Festival poster
- Opening film: Cold Mountain
- Closing film: 25 Degrees in Winter
- Location: Berlin, Germany
- Founded: 1951
- Awards: Golden Bear: Head-On
- Hosted by: Anke Engelke
- No. of films: 290 films
- Festival date: 5–15 February 2004
- Website: Website

Berlin International Film Festival chronology
- 55th 53rd

The 54th annual Berlin International Film Festival was held from 5–15 February 2004. The festival opened with out of competition film Cold Mountain by Anthony Minghella. 25 Degrees in Winter by Stéphane Vuillet served as the closing film.

The Golden Bear was awarded to Head-On directed by Fatih Akın.

The retrospective dedicated to films from 1967 to 1976 titled New Hollywood 1967-1976. Trouble in Wonderland was shown at the festival. It focuses on the films from the period known as New Hollywood or American New Wave, and attended by some of the film-makers and actors of that era including Peter Davis, Peter Fonda, William Greaves, Monte Hellman and Melvin Van Peebles.

== Juries ==
Frances McDormand, Jury President

The following people were announced as being on the jury for the festival:

=== Main Competition ===
- Frances McDormand, American actress - Jury President
- Maji-da Abdi, Ethiopian filmmaker and producer
- Valeria Bruni Tedeschi, Italian actress
- Samira Makhmalbaf, Iranian filmmaker
- Peter Rommel, German producer
- Gabriele Salvatores, Italian filmmaker
- Dan Talbot, American distributor

=== Short Films Competition ===
- Christine Dollhofer, Austrian journalist and event creator
- Sophie Maintigneux, French director of photography
- Vinca Wiedemann, Danish producer

== Official Sections ==
=== Main Competition ===
The following films were in competition for the Golden Bear and Silver Bear awards:

English title	Original title	Director(s)	Country
20 30 40		Sylvia Chang	Hong Kong, Taiwan, Japan
25 Degrees in Winter	25 degrés en hiver	Stéphane Vuillet	Belgium, France, Russia, Spain
The Beautiful Country		Hans Petter Moland	United States, Norway
Before Sunset		Richard Linklater	United States
Daybreak	Om jag vänder mig om	Björn Runge	Sweden
The Final Cut		Omar Naim	Canada, Germany
First Love	Primo Amore	Matteo Garrone	Italy
Head-On	Gegen die Wand	Fatih Akın	Germany, Turkey
Intimate Strangers	Confidences trop intimes	Patrice Leconte	France
In My Country		John Boorman	UK, Ireland, South Africa
In Your Hands	Forbrydelser	Annette K. Olesen	Denmark
Just A Kiss...	Ae Fond Kiss...	Ken Loach	UK, Belgium, Germany, Italy, Spain
Lost Embrace	El Abrazo Partido	Daniel Burman	Argentina, France, Italy, Spain
Maria Full of Grace		Joshua Marston	United States, Colombia
The Missing		Ron Howard	United States
Monster		Patty Jenkins	United States, Germany
Nightsongs	Die Nacht singt ihre Lieder	Romuald Karmakar	Germany
Red Lights	Feux rouges	Cédric Kahn	France
Samaritan Girl	사마리아	Kim Ki-duk	South Korea
Triple Agent		Éric Rohmer	France, Spain, Italy, Greece, Russia
Trilogy: The Weeping Meadow	Τριλογία: Το λιβάδι που δακρύζει	Theodoros Angelopoulos	Greece, Germany, France, Italy
Witnesses	Svjedoci	Vinko Brešan	Croatia
Your Next Life	La vida que te espera	Manuel Gutiérrez Aragón	Spain

=== Out of Competition ===
- Cold Mountain by Anthony Minghella (opening film)
- 25 Degrees in Winter by Stéphane Vuillet (closing film)

=== Short Films Competition ===
The following short films were selected:

English title	Original title	Director(s)	Country
Bugs	Käfer	Igor Ivanov Izi	Macedonia
Cigarettes and Coffee	Un cartus de kent si un pachet de cafea	Cristi Puiu	Romania
Dajo		Hanro Smitsman	Netherlands
Goodbye, Cruel World		Vito Rocco	United States
Great!	Vet!	Karin Junger, Brigit Hillenius	Netherlands
Little Man	Little Man	Martin Brierley	UK, South Africa
Ola's Box of Clovers		Genevieve Anderson	United States
Public/Private		Christoph Behl	Argentina
The Rules of Flying	De regels van het vliegen	Eugenie Jansen	Netherlands
The Russell Tribunal	Russelltribunalen	Staffan Lamm	Sweden
Sapiens	Сапиенс	Aleksandr Rogozhkin	Russia
The Scree		Paul McDermott	Australia
The Soul Hunter		Christine Rebet	Germany
True		Tom Tykwer	Germany, France
Le vilain petit poussin		Rachid Bouchareb	France
With What Shall I Wash It?	Con qué la lavaré?	María Trénor	Spain
A Woman's Place	Kvinnans Plats	Ewa Cederstam	Sweden

== Official Awards ==
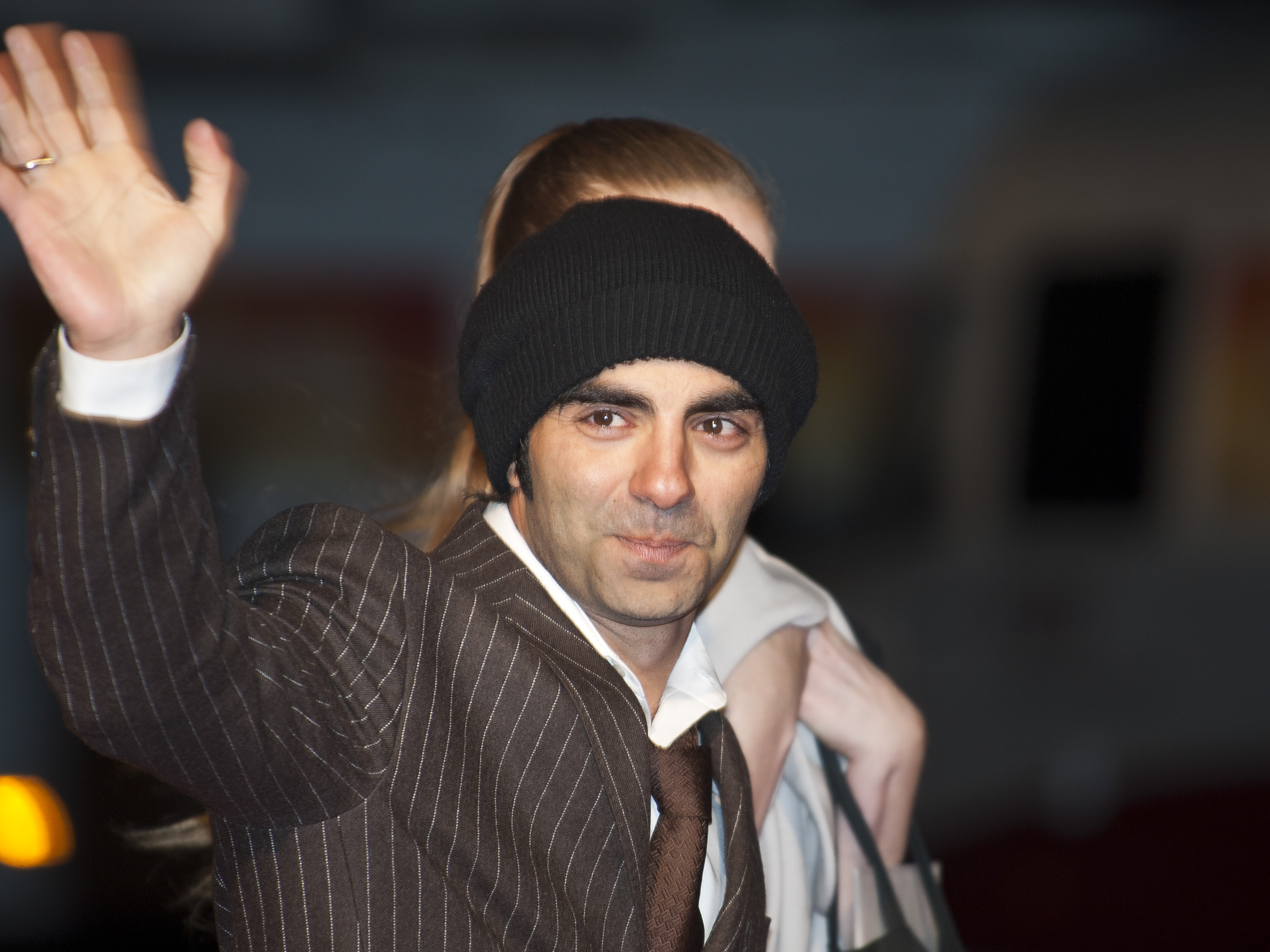
Fatih Akın, winner of the Golden Bear at the festival

=== Main Competition ===
The following prizes were awarded by the Jury:

- Golden Bear: Head-On by Fatih Akın
- Silver Bear Jury Grand Prix: Lost Embrace by Daniel Burman
- Silver Bear for Best Director: Kim Ki-duk for Samaritan Girl
- Silver Bear for Best Actress:
  - Catalina Sandino Moreno for Maria Full of Grace
  - Charlize Theron for Monster
- Silver Bear for Best Actor: Daniel Hendler for Lost Embrace
- Silver Bear for Best Film Music: Banda Osiris for First Love
- Silver Bear for Outstanding Artistic Achievement: Leif Andrée, Pernilla August, Jan Coster, Jakob Eklund, Ingvar Hirdwall, Magnus Krepper, Johan Kvarnström, Camilla Larsson, Marika Lindström, Peter Lorentzon, Hampus Penttinen, Ann Petrén, Marie Richardson, Jenny Svärdsäter, Claes-Göran Turesson for Daybreak

=== Honorary Golden Bear ===
- Fernando E. Solanas

=== Short Films Competition ===
- Short Film Golden Bear: Cigarettes and Coffee by Cristi Puiu
- Silver Bear: Great! by Karin Junger, Brigit Hillenius
- Honorable Mention: Public/Private by Christoph Behl

=== Berlinale Camera ===
- Willy Sommerfeld
- Regina Ziegler
- Erika Rabau
- Rolf Bähr

== Independent Awards ==
=== Panorama Audience Award ===
- Best Feature Film: Addicted to Acting by Andres Veiel
- Best Short Film: Passing Hearts by Johan Brisinger

=== Crystal Bear ===
- Best Short Film: Stormy Night by Michèle Lemieux
  - Special Mention:
    - Circuit marine by Isabelle Favez
    - Maree by James Pellerito
- Best Feature Film: Magnifico by Maryo J. De Los Reyes
  - Special Mention:
    - The Blind Flyers by Bernd Sahling
    - Raining Cats and Frogs by Jacques-Rémy Girerd
- 14plus: Best Feature Film: The Wooden Camera by Ntshaveni Wa Luruli
  - Special Mention: Quality of Life by Benjamin Morgan

=== FIPRESCI Award ===
- Head-On: Fatih Akın
