= Karbauskis =

Karbauskis is a Lithuanian surname. Notable people with the surname include:

- Mindaugas Karbauskis (born 1972), Lithuanian theater director
- Ramūnas Karbauskis (born 1969), Lithuanian businessman and politician
