= Hypnosis (2020 film) =

- Directed by: Valery Todorovsky
- Written by: Lubov Mulmenko; Valery Todorovsky
- Produced by: Valery Todorovsky; Natalya Drozd-Makan; Alexy Khyuverinen
- Starring: Sergey Giro; Maksim Sukhanov; Ekaterina Fedulova; Sergey Medvedev; Stepan Sereda; Polina Galkina; Alexandr Zamurayev
- Music by: Anna Drubich
- Production companies: Don Films; Marmot-film
- Release date: October 15, 2020
- Country: Russia
- Language: Russian

Hypnosis (Russian: Гипноз) is a 2020 Russian-Finnish drama film directed by Valery Todorovsky. It was theatrically released in Russia on October 15, 2020.

== Plot ==
The main character of the film is a teenager named Misha, who begins hypnosis sessions with a therapist to cure his sleepwalking. Gradually, he falls under the hypnotist’s influence and loses the ability to distinguish reality from illusion. When another patient of the therapist disappears, Misha launches his own investigation and realizes that he had seen all previous events very differently from how they actually were.

== Cast ==
- Sergey Giro as Misha
- Maksim Sukhanov as Volkov
- Ekaterina Fedulova as
- Sergey Medvedev as Yura
- Stepan Sereda as Vasya
- Polina Galkina as Polina
- Alexandr Zamurayev as Oleg
