= The Voice (Russian TV series) season 11 =

The Voice
- Season 11
- Presented by: Yana Churikova
- Coaches: Vladimir Presnyakov; Polina Gagarina; Basta; Anton Belyaev
- Winner: Viktoria Solomahina
- Winning coach: Polina Gagarina
- Runner-up: Elmira Divaeva

Release
- Original network: Channel One
- Original release: March 3, 2023 – 2 June 2023

Season chronology
- ← Previous; Season 10 Next → Season 12

The eleventh season of the Russian reality talent show The Voice premiered on March 3, 2023, on Channel One. Following the conclusion of the tenth season, the panel was entirely changed as none of the coaches and host from last season returned. Polina Gagarina and Basta returned as coaches. Vladimir Presnyakov and Anton Belyaev joined the show as new coaches, whereas Yana Churikova joined as host.

Viktoria Solomakhina was announced as the winner of the season, marking Polina Gagarina's second win as a coach, and maintaining her winning streak from season 9. With Solomakhina's win, Gagarina become the first female coach to win multiple seasons of the main show, The Voice Russia. Also, Solomakhina became the first winner, who had a block in the Blind Auditions (Gagarina blocked Basta)

== Coaches and presenter ==
On February 6, 2023, Channel One announced that Polina Gagarina and Basta would be returning as coaches after one season break along with two new coaches — Vladimir Presnyakov and Anton Belyaev, with the latter being the first former contestant on the show to become a coach. Belyaev was a contestant on the second season and made it to the semi-finals.

Dmitry Nagiev did not return as the show's presenter and was replaced by Yana Churikova.

The Voice season 11 coaches and presenter

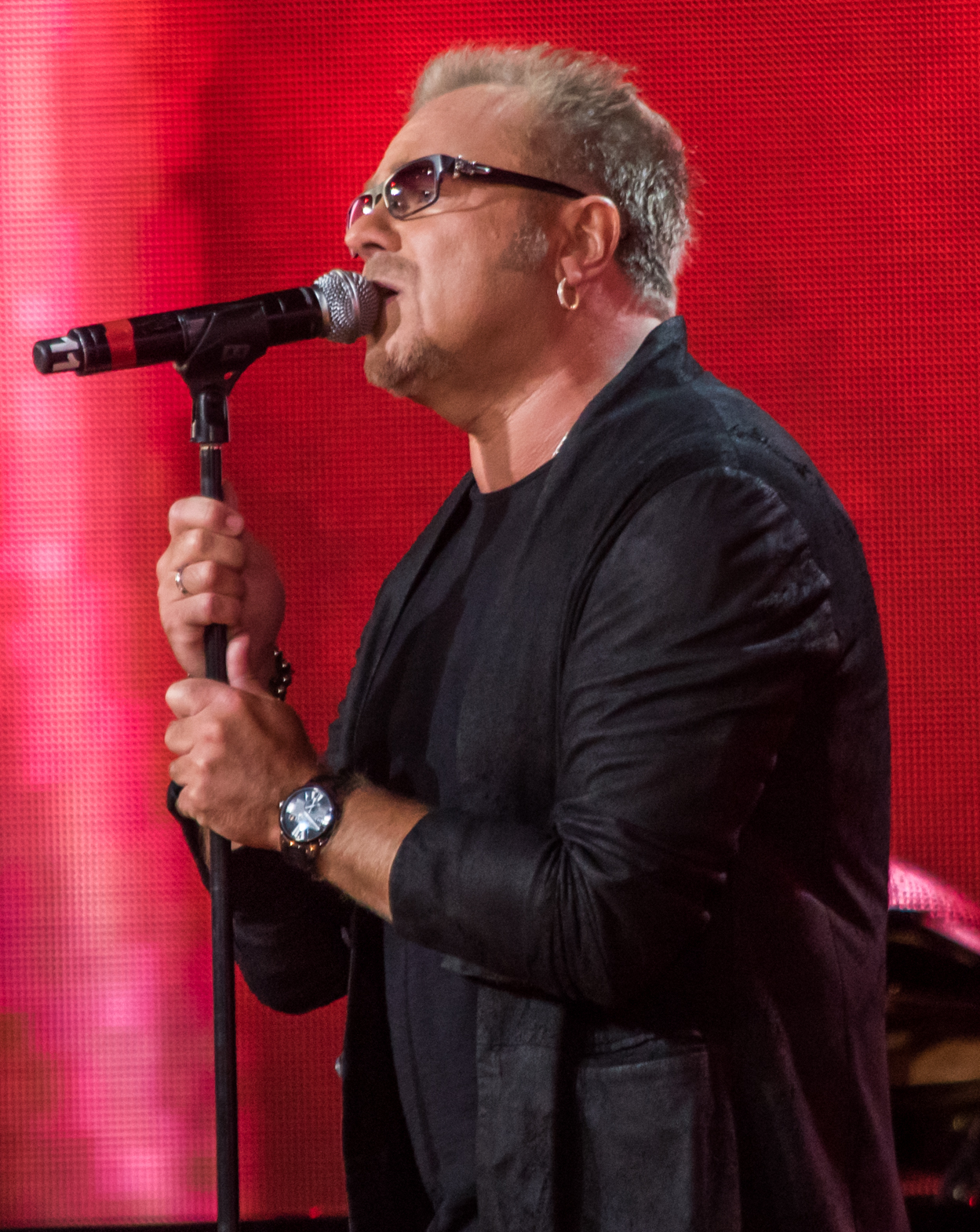
Vladimir Presnyakov

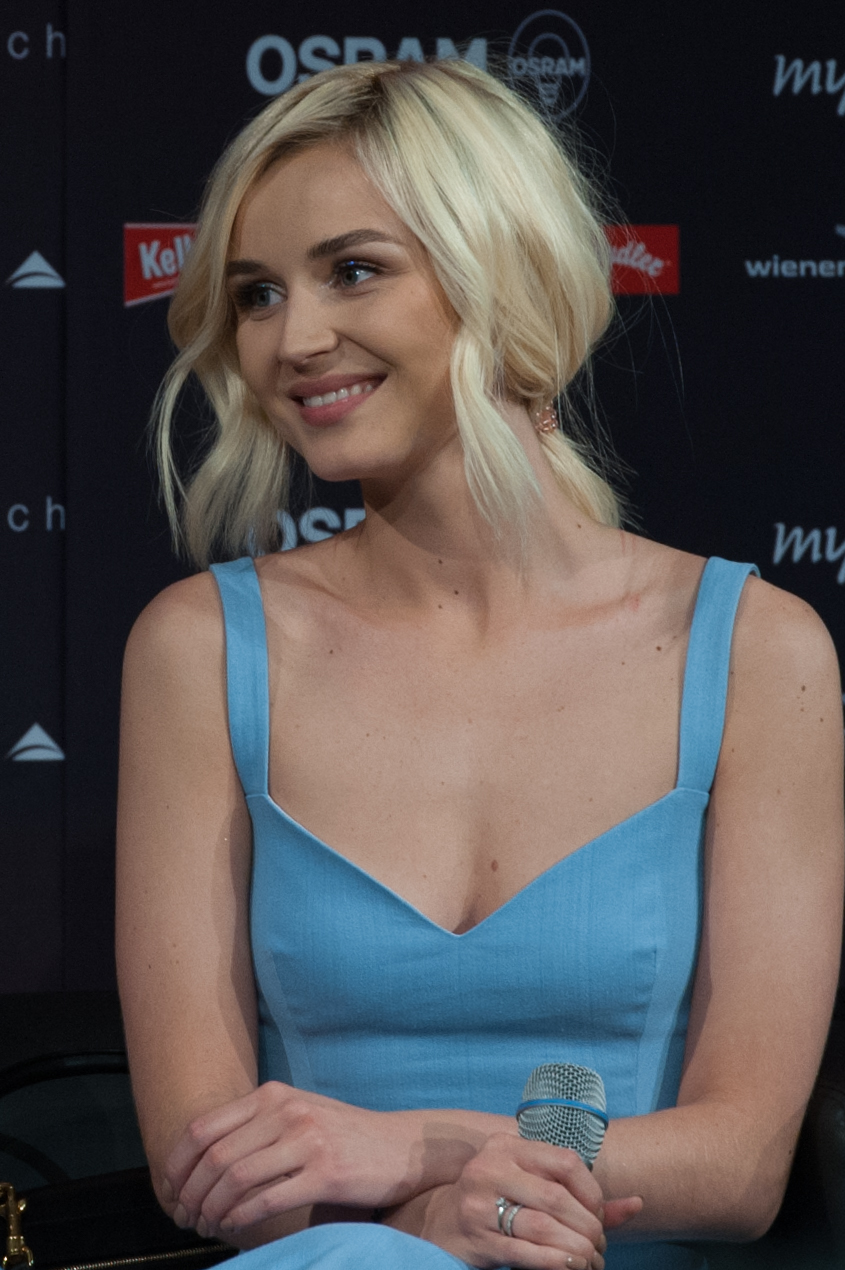
Polina Gagarina

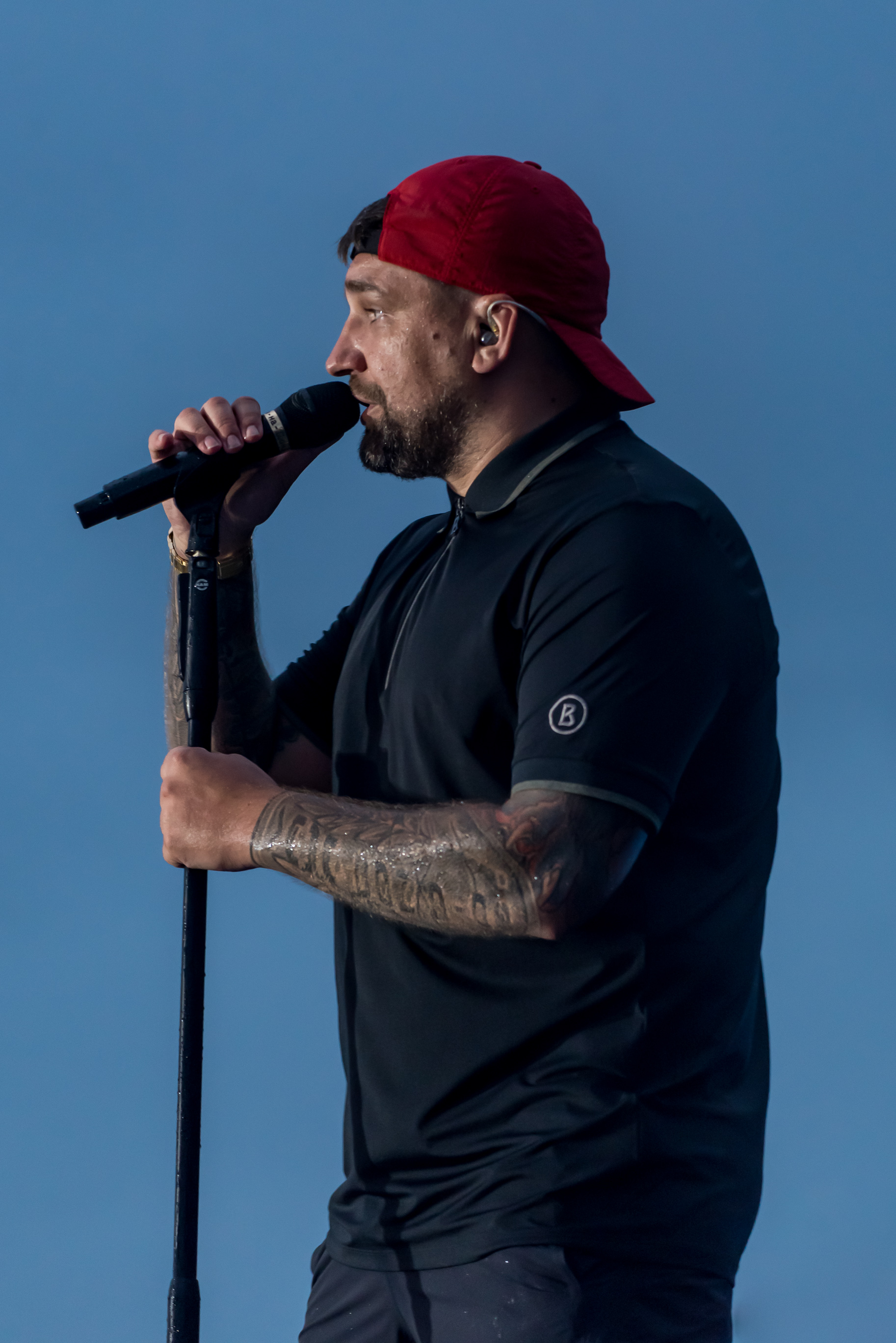
Basta

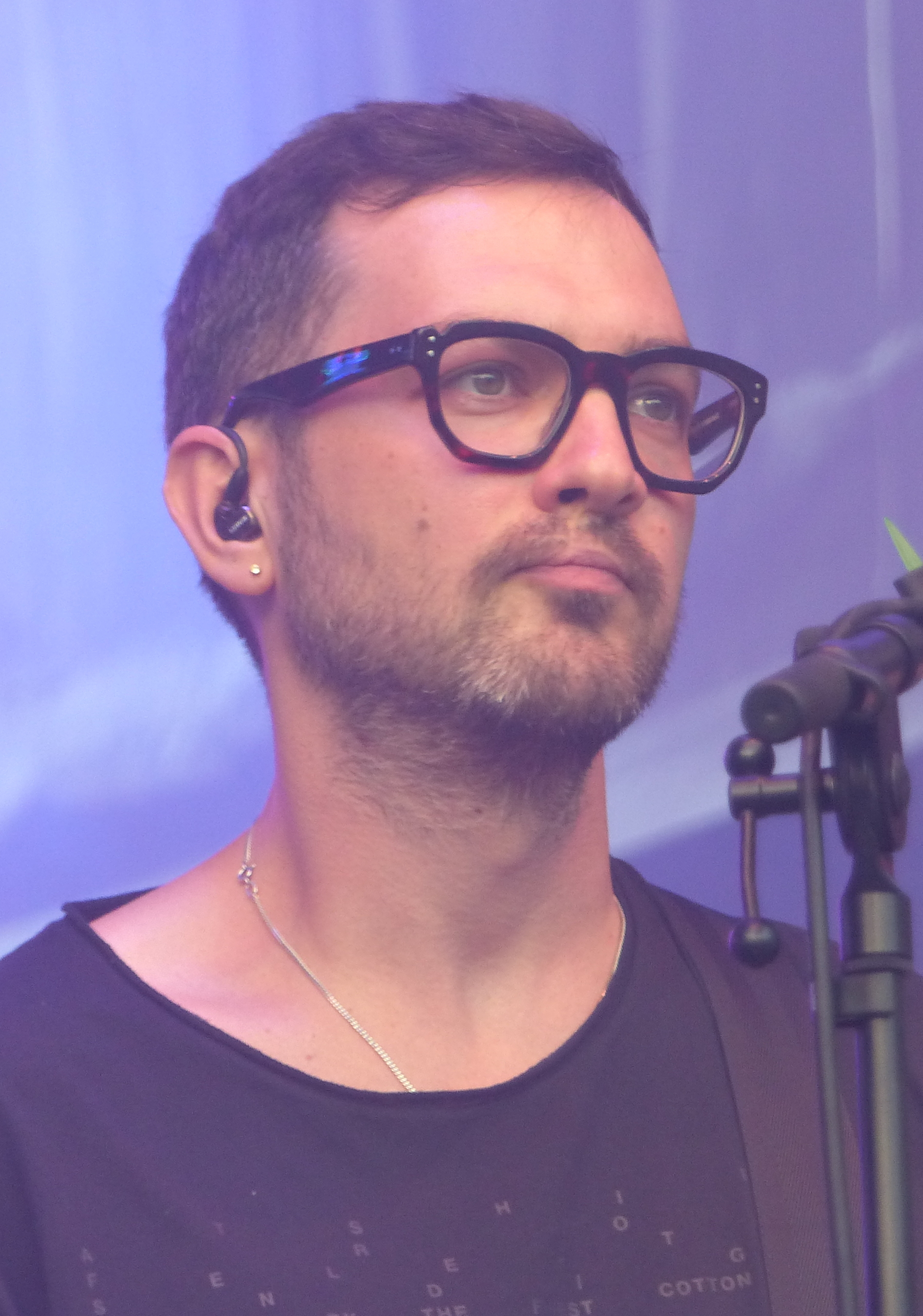
Anton Belyaev

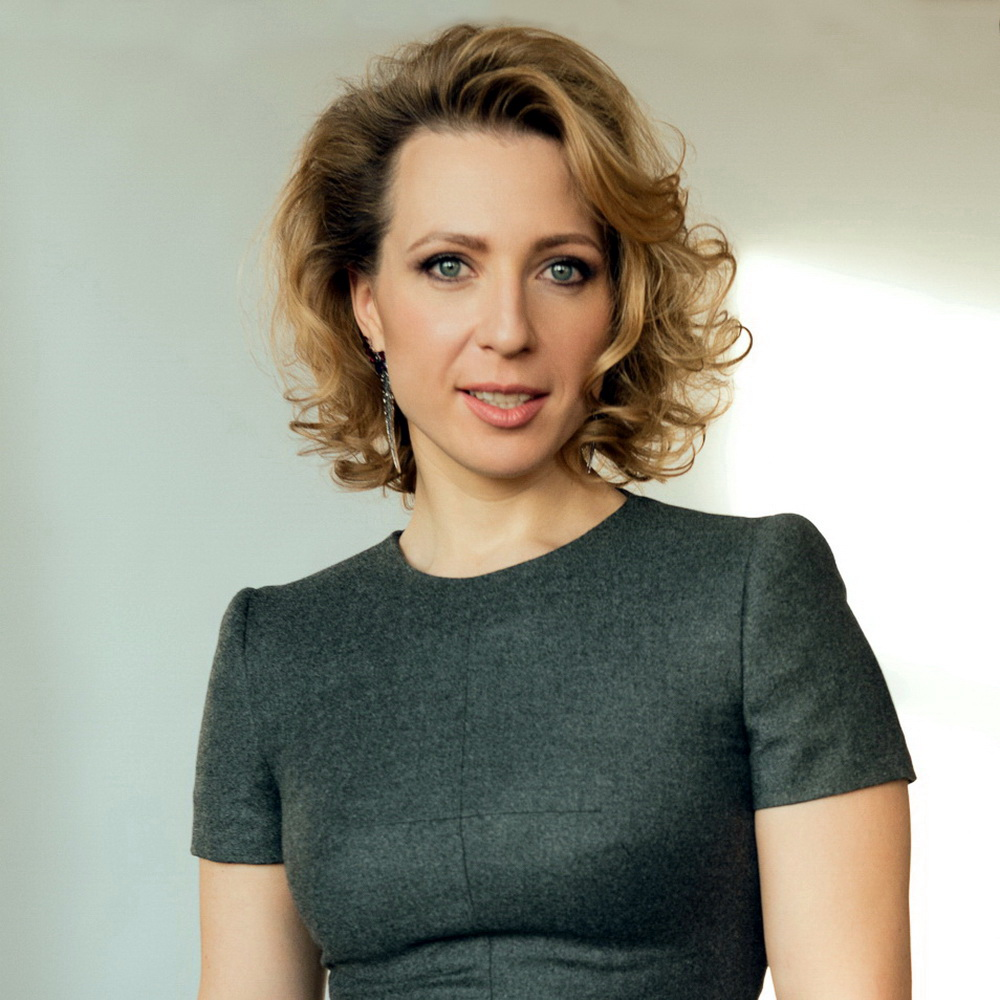
Yana Churikova

== Teams ==
Colour key

- Winner
- Runner-up
- Third place
- Fourth place
- Eliminated in the Semi-final
- Eliminated in the Quarterfinal
- Stolen in the Knockout rounds
- Eliminated in the Knockout rounds
- Eliminated in the Battle rounds

Coaches	Top 49 artists				
Vladimir Presnyakov					
Vladimir Presnyakov	Elmira Divaeva	Margarita Bagdasaryan	Alina Bakhshalieva	~~Lyudmila Serebryakova~~	~~Akhmed Akhmedov~~
Vladimir Presnyakov	Masha Mey	Arut Grigoryan	Darel Alfonso	Evgeny Sinitsyn	Vasily Shkividorov
Vladimir Presnyakov	Ilya Anopriev	Olesya Plotnikova	Vadim Evteev	Yulia Garifullina	
Polina Gagarina					
Polina Gagarina	Viktoria Solomakhina	Nadezhda Proskurina	Akhmed Akhmedov	Anastasia Barannikova	Yana Arndt
Polina Gagarina	Ilona Krasnikova	Vladislav Zotov	Georgy Lituev	Dmitry Zhukov	Ivan Romanenko
Polina Gagarina	Denis Primak	Tais Urumidis	Alina Gubina		
Basta					
Basta	Lyudmila Serebryakova	Pavel Zibrov	Maria Lapshina	~~Irina Syshchikova~~	~~Alina Bakhshalieva~~
Basta	Polina Kuzmina	Anastasia Demidova	Sergey Korobeynikov	Daria	Sofia Maltseva
Basta	Kristina Yatsenko	Anvar Dzhuraev	Viktoria Gissen		
Anton Belyaev					
Anton Belyaev	Irina Syshchikova	Nikolay Shcherba	Gulnara Bayguzina	Anastasia Kaprelyan	Astemir Bolov
Anton Belyaev	Daniil and Yulia Brant	Viktoria Knyazhevskaya	Aynur Nurpeisova	Yulia Dementyeva	Elina Aylarova
Anton Belyaev	Ricardo Rodrigez	Fyodor Uvarov	Anna Lyashenko		

== Blind auditions ==
The feature The Best coach of the season (in each episode) was applied again this season.

Colour key

✔	Coach pressed "I WANT YOU" button
✔	Coach pressed "I WANT YOU", even its team has already full
	Artist defaulted to a coach's team
	Artist picked a coach's team
	Artist eliminated with no coach pressing their button
✘	Coach pressed "I WANT YOU" button, but was blocked by another coach from getting the artist
	Blocked by Vladimir Presnyakov; Blocked by Polina Gagarina; Blocked by Basta; Blocked by Anton Belyaev

A new feature of blind auditions this season is a block that each coach can use three times to prevent one of the other coaches from getting a contestant.

The coaches performed "Livin' la Vida Loca" at the start of the show.

Episode	Order	Artist	Age	Origin	Song	Coach's and artist's choices			
Episode	Order	Artist	Age	Origin	Song	Presnyakov	Gagarina	Basta	Belyaev
Episode 1 (Note: Basta is The best coach of episode 1.) (March 3)	1	Vladislav Zotov	27	Bishkek, Kyrgyzstan	"Кострома" / "Коляда"	✔	✔	✔	—
Episode 1 (March 3)	2	Elmira Divaeva	28	Sterlitamak, Bashkiria	"Зима"	✔	✔	—	—
Episode 1 (March 3)	3	Nikolay Shcherba	24	Ekaterinburg	"Survivor" / "I Will Survive"	✔	✔	✔	✔
Episode 1 (March 3)	4	Kristina Gevorgyan	29	Bystry Istok, Altai Krai	"Знаешь ли ты?"	—	—	—	—
Episode 1 (March 3)	5	Georgy Lituev	21	Ekaterinburg	"С тобой"	—	✔	—	—
Episode 1 (March 3)	6	Vadim Evteev	31	Balashov, Saratov Oblast	"Umbrella"	✔	—	—	—
Episode 1 (March 3)	7	Viktoria Solomakhina	19	Voronezh	"Обернись"	✔	✔	✘	✔
Episode 1 (March 3)	8	Aleksandr Savelyev	38	Nizhny Novgorod	"Одинокая гармонь"	—	—	—	—
Episode 1 (March 3)	9	Kristina Yatsenko	33	Moscow	"Levitating"	—	—	✔	—
Episode 2 (Note: Basta is The best coach of episode 2.) (March 10)	1	Lyudmila Serebryakova	21	Moscow	"На одной Земле"	✔	✔	✔	✔
Episode 2 (March 10)	2	Denis Primak	17	Shchyolkovo, Moscow Oblast	"Le Temps Des Cathédrales"	—	✔	✔	✔
Episode 2 (March 10)	3	Anna Agafonova	26	Kazan	"Я не умею танцевать"	—	—	—	—
Episode 2 (March 10)	4	Masha Mey	16	Moscow	"Rolling in the Deep"	✔	✔	—	—
Episode 2 (March 10)	5	Igor Lipnevich	36	Chișinău, Moldova	"Грешная страсть"	—	—	—	—
Episode 2 (March 10)	6	Gulnara Bayguzina	21	Ufa, Republic of Bashkortostan	"Романс"	✘	✔	✔	✔
Episode 2 (March 10)	7	Tais Urumidis	47	Sochi, Krasnodar Krai	"Call Me"	—	✔	—	—
Episode 2 (March 10)	8	Egor Grigoryev	20	Bor, Nizhny Novgorod Oblast	"Евпатория"	—	—	—	—
Episode 2 (March 10)	9	Yulia Garifullina	33	Perm	"Мир без любимого"	✔	✔	—	—
Episode 2 (March 10)	10	Daria	35	Moscow	"Livin’ on a Prayer"	✘	✔	✔	—
Episode 3 (Note: Basta is The best coach of episode 3.) (March 17)	1	Ilya Slastyonov	27	Moscow	"Мой друг (лучше всех играет блюз)"	—	—	—	—
Episode 3 (March 17)	2	Margarita Bagdasaryan	30	Sochi, Krasnodar Krai	"Сестричка"	✔	✔	✔	✘
Episode 3 (March 17)	3	Ricardo Rodrigez	38	Rio de Janeiro, Brazil	"Mas Que Nada"	—	✔	—	✔
Episode 3 (March 17)	4	Sofia Maltseva	20	Chita	"Мне нравится, что вы больны не мной"	—	—	✔	—
Episode 3 (March 17)	5	Fyodor Uvarov	16	Zelenograd, Moscow Oblast	"Grace Kelly"	—	✔	✔	✔
Episode 3 (March 17)	6	Ekaterina Zhukova	31	Makiivka, Ukraine	"Кабриолет"	—	—	—	—
Episode 3 (March 17)	7	Vasily Shkividorov	35	Yuzhno-Sakhalinsk	"Broken Vow"	✔	✘	✔	✔
Episode 3 (March 17)	8	Olesya Plotnikova	35	Engels, Saratov Oblast	"Летний дождь"	✔	—	—	—
Episode 3 (March 17)	9	Dmitry Volkov	36	Vladimir	"Три года ты мне снилась"	—	—	—	—
Episode 3 (March 17)	10	Irina Syshchikova	41	Bataysk, Rostov Oblast	«Dernière danse»	—	—	✔	—
Episode 4 (Note: Basta is The best coach of episode 4.) (March 24)	1	Alina Bakhshalieva	18	Saratov	"Драмы больше нет"	—	✔	✔	—
Episode 4 (March 24)	2	Astemir Bolov	24	Nalchik	"Papaoutai"	✔	✘	✔	✔
Episode 4 (March 24)	3	Alina Gubina	23	Efremov, Tula Oblast	"Не надо слов"	—	✔	—	—
Episode 4 (March 24)	4	Viktoria Gissen	33	Moscow	"Всё равно ты будешь мой"	—	✔	✔	✔
Episode 4 (March 24)	5	John Warren	54	Miami, United States	"How Deep Is Your Love"	—	—	—	—
Episode 4 (March 24)	6	Ilona Krasnikova	34	Kaliningrad	"Lo ti penso amore"	✔	✔	—	—
Episode 4 (March 24)	7	Ekaterina Lesovaya	22	Krasnodar	"Виновата ли я"	—	—	—	—
Episode 4 (March 24)	8	Roman Levin	35	Moscow	"Режиссёр"	—	—	—	—
Episode 4 (March 24)	9	Akhmed Akhmedov	31	Bukhara, Uzbekistan	"I Want It That Way"	✔	—	—	—
Episode 4 (March 24)	10	Nadezhda Proskurina	37	Mezhdurechensk, Kemerovo Oblast	"Снилось мне"	—	✔	✔	✔
Episode 5 (Note: Basta is The best coach of episode 5.) (March 31)	1	Anna Lyashenko	18	Tolyatti, Samara Oblast	"Ой, да степь широкая"	✔	—	—	✔
Episode 5 (March 31)	2	Pavel Zibrov	46	Rostov-on-Don	"Я постелю тебе под ноги небо"	—	—	✔	✔
Episode 5 (March 31)	3	Daniil and Yulia Brant	31/36	Saratov	"The Prayer"	✔	✔	✔	✔
Episode 5 (March 31)	4	Darel Alfonso	29	Cárdenas, Cuba	"Rebel Yell"	✔	—	—	—
Episode 5 (March 31)	5	Anastasia Lipyanskaya	26	Stary Oskol, Belgorod Oblast	"Поднимись над суетой"	—	—	—	—
Episode 5 (March 31)	6	Dmitry Zhukov	31	Lodeynoye Pole, Leningrad Oblast	"I'm Still Standing"	—	✔	—	—
Episode 5 (March 31)	7	Stanislav Danshin	40	Donskoy, Tula Oblast	"Улицы ждали"	—	—	—	—
Episode 5 (March 31)	8	Elina Aylarova	20	Vladikavkaz	"Always Remember Us This Way"	✔	✔	✔	✔
Episode 5 (March 31)	9	Arut Grigoryan	21	Moscow	"Стану ли я счастливей"	✔	—	—	—
Episode 5 (March 31)	10	Natalia Podolskaya	40	Mogilev, Belarus	"If I Were a Boy"	✘	✔	✔	✔
Episode 6 (Note: Basta is The best coach of episode 6.) (April 7)	1	Ivan Romanenko	35	Volzhsky, Volgograd Oblast	"La vie en rose"	✔	✔	—	—
Episode 6 (April 7)	2	Anastasia Demidova	21	Moscow	"Всё не так просто"	—	✔	✔	—
Episode 6 (April 7)	3	Aynur Nurpeisova	31	Kyzylorda, Kazakhstan	"Talking to the Moon"	✔	✔	✔	✔
Episode 6 (April 7)	4	Anzhelika Pushnova	25	Minsk, Belarus	"Маршрутка"	—	—	—	—
Episode 6 (April 7)	5	Sergey Korobeynikov	40	Nizhny Tagil, Sverdlovsk Oblast	"Прыгну со скалы"	—	—	✔	—
Episode 6 (April 7)	6	Viktoria Orbodoeva	34	Ulan-Ude	"Easy on Me"	—	—	—	—
Episode 6 (April 7)	7	Maria Lapshina	24	Moscow	"Just Say I Love Her"	—	✔	✔	—
Episode 6 (April 7)	8	Daniil Ushakov	24	Sarapul, Udmurtia	"Проститься"	—	—	—	—
Episode 6 (April 7)	9	Yana Arndt	17	Chelyabinsk	"I See Red"	—	✔	—	—
Episode 6 (April 7)	10	Evgeny Sinitsyn	29	Velsk, Arkhangelsk Oblast	"Там нет меня"	✔	✘	✔	✔
Episode 7 (Note: Basta is The best coach of episode 7.) (April 14)	1	Ilya Anopriev	36	Zheleznogorsk, Krasnoyarsk Krai	"Полетели"	✔	✔	—	—
Episode 7 (April 14)	2	Anastasia Kaprelyan	19	Rostov-on-Don	"Só Danço Samba"	Team full	✔	✔	✔
Episode 7 (April 14)	3	Ilya Kuzmitskiy	30	Novobureysky, Amur Oblast	"Солнце"	Team full	—	—	—
Episode 7 (April 14)	4	Anvar Dzhuraev	43	Tashkent, Uzbekistan	"Cose della Vita"	Team full	✔	✔	✔
Episode 7 (April 14)	5	Polina Kuzmina	21	Moscow	"Милая"	Team full	✔	✔	—
Episode 7 (April 14)	6	Alexey Gorbunov	36	Saint Petersburg	"Город влюблённых"	Team full	—	Team full	—
Episode 7 (April 14)	7	Yulia Dementyeva	32	Muravlenko, Yamalo-Nenets Autonomous Okrug	"I Wanna Dance with Somebody"	✔	✔	✔	✔
Episode 7 (April 14)	8	Petr Login	35	Chișinău, Moldova	"Ворона"	Team full	—	Team full	—
Episode 7 (April 14)	9	Anastasia Barannikova	29	Essentuki, Stavropol Krai	"Nothing Compares 2 U"	Team full	✔	Team full	—
Episode 7 (April 14)	10	Asta Khachartyan	37	Vanadzor, Armenia	"Sex Bomb"	Team full	Team full	Team full	—
Episode 7 (April 14)	11	Viktoria Knyazhevskaya	30	Ivanovo	"Ау"	✔	✔	✔	✔

== The Battles ==
The Battle Rounds will be starting on April 21, 2023. No steal were available. Contestants who win their battle would advance to the Knockout rounds.

Colour key

Artist won the Battle and advanced to the Knockouts
Artist lost the Battle and was eliminated

Episode	Coach	Order	Winner	Song	Loser
Episode 8 (April 21) (Note: Basta is The best coach of episode 8.)	Basta	1	Polina Kuzmina	«Ленинградский рок-н-ролл» / «Кошки» / «Жёлтые ботинки» / «Вася»	Viktoria Gissen
Episode 8 (April 21)	Polina Gagarina	2	Vladislav Zotov	«Широка река»	Alina Gubina
Episode 8 (April 21)	Vladimir Presnyakov	3	Elmira Divaeva	«Can’t Help Falling in Love»	Yulia Garifullina
Episode 8 (April 21)	Anton Belyaev	4	Astemir Bolov	«Глупые люди»	Anna Lyashenko
Episode 8 (April 21)	Basta	5	Irina Syshchikova	«Как любовь твою понять?»	Anvar Dzhuraev
Episode 8 (April 21)	Polina Gagarina	6	Ilona Krasnikova	«Кошачий дуэт»	Tais Urumidis
Episode 8 (April 21)	Vladimir Presnyakov	7	Masha Mey	«По-другому»	Vadim Evteev
Episode 8 (April 21)	Anton Belyaev	8	Daniil & Yulia Brant's	«Последняя поэма»	Fyodor Uvarov
Episode 8 (April 21)	Basta	9	Alina Bakhshalieva	«In and Out of Love»	Kristina Yatsenko
Episode 8 (April 21)	Polina Gagarina	10	Yana Arndt	«Одно и то же»	Denis Primak
Episode 8 (April 21)	Anton Belyaev	11	Anastasia Kaprelyan	«Águas de Março»	Ricardo Rodrigez
Episode 8 (April 21)	Vladimir Presnyakov	12	Lyudmila Serebryakova	«Кукла колдуна»	Olesya Plotnikova
Episode 9 (April 28) (Note: Basta is The best coach of episode 9.)	Vladimir Presnyakov	1	Akhmed Akhmedov	«Фантазёр»	Ilya Anopriev
Episode 9 (April 28)	Anton Belyaev	2	Viktoria Knyazhevskaya	«Пропадаю я»	Ellina Aylarova
Episode 9 (April 28)	Polina Gagarina	3	Anastasia Barannikova	«Padam, padam...»	Ivan Romanenko
Episode 9 (April 28)	Basta	4	Anastasia Demidova	«Фонари»	Sofia Maltseva
Episode 9 (April 28)	Vladimir Presnyakov	5	Arut Grigoryan	«Беги»	Vasily Shkividorov
Episode 9 (April 28)	Vladimir Presnyakov	5	Arut Grigoryan	«Беги»	Evgeny Sinitsyn
Episode 9 (April 28)	Anton Belyaev	6	Nikolay Shcherba	«Отпускаю»	Yulia Dementyeva
Episode 9 (April 28)	Basta	7	Pavel Zibrov	«Roses»	Daria
Episode 9 (April 28)	Polina Gagarina	8	Nadezhda Proskurina	«Белая ночь»	Dmitry Zhukov
Episode 9 (April 28)	Vladimir Presnyakov	9	Margarita Bagdasaryan	«Gossip» / «Всё нормально»	Darel Alfonso
Episode 9 (April 28)	Polina Gagarina	10	Viktoria Solomakhina	«Ты здесь»	Georgy Lituev
Episode 9 (April 28)	Anton Belyaev	11	Gulnara Bayguzina	«Lose Yourself»	Aynur Nurpeisova
Episode 9 (April 28)	Basta	12	Maria Lapshina	«Земля»	Sergey Korobeynikov

== The Knockouts ==
The Knockout Rounds started on May 5, 2023. Similar to the previous season, each coach pairs three artists into one knockout with only one contestant from the trio advances to the next round and also can steal one losing artist from another coach. The top 12 contestants moved on to the Quarterfinal.

Colour key

Artist won the Knockout and advanced to the Quarterfinal
Artist lost the Knockout but was stolen by another coach and advanced to the Quarterfinal
Artist lost the Knockout and was eliminated

Episode	Coach	Order	Song	Artists		Song	'Steal' result			
Episode	Coach	Order	Song	Winner	Losers	Song	Presnyakov	Gagarina	Basta	Belyaev
Episode 10 (May 5) (Note: Basta is The best coach of episode 10.)	Polina Gagarina	1	«Ласточка»	Viktoria Solomakhina	Vladislav Zotov	«Ты не верь слезам»	—	—	—	—
Episode 10 (May 5)	Polina Gagarina	1	«Ласточка»	Viktoria Solomakhina	Ilona Krasnikova	«Волшебная флейта» / «Highway to Hell»	—	—	—	—
Episode 10 (May 5)	Vladimir Presnyakov	2	«Я хочу быть с тобой»	Margarita Bagdasaryan	Lyudmila Serebryakova	«Посмотри в глаза»	—	✔	✔	—
Episode 10 (May 5)	Vladimir Presnyakov	2	«Я хочу быть с тобой»	Margarita Bagdasaryan	Arut Grigoryan	«Сука любовь»	—	—	Team full	—
Episode 10 (May 5)	Anton Belyaev	3	«Losing My Religion»	Nikolay Shcherba	Yulia & Daniil Brant	«Плачут небеса»	—	—	Team full	—
Episode 10 (May 5)	Anton Belyaev	3	«Losing My Religion»	Nikolay Shcherba	Viktoria Knyazhevskaya	«Ищу тебя»	—	—	Team full	—
Episode 10 (May 5)	Basta	4	«Ничего не бойся»	Pavel Zibrov	Irina Syshchikova	«Euphoria»	✔	✔	Team full	✔
Episode 10 (May 5)	Basta	4	«Ничего не бойся»	Pavel Zibrov	Anastasia Demidova	«Моя звезда»	—	—	Team full	Team full
Episode 11 (May 12) (Note: Basta is The best coach of episode 11.)	Anton Belyaev	1	«Никаких больше вечеринок»	Gulnara Bayguzina	Astemir Bolov	«Con te partirò»	—	—	Team full	Team full
Episode 11 (May 12)	Anton Belyaev	1	«Никаких больше вечеринок»	Gulnara Bayguzina	Anastasia Kaprelyan	«Нежность»	—	—	Team full	Team full
Episode 11 (May 12)	Polina Gagarina	2	«History Repeating»	Nadezhda Proskurina	Yana Arndt	«Вьюга»	—	—	Team full	Team full
Episode 11 (May 12)	Polina Gagarina	2	«History Repeating»	Nadezhda Proskurina	Anastasia Barannikova	«Катастрофически»	—	—	Team full	Team full
Episode 11 (May 12)	Vladimir Presnyakov	3	«Про любовь»	Elmira Divaeva	Akhmed Akhmedov	«Солнце»	—	✔	Team full	Team full
Episode 11 (May 12)	Vladimir Presnyakov	3	«Про любовь»	Elmira Divaeva	Masha Mey	«Ты узнаешь её»	—	Team full	Team full	Team full
Episode 11 (May 12)	Basta	4	«Вселиственный венок» / «А кто нас покрывать будет?»	Maria Lapshina	Alina Bakhshalieva	«Рокки»	✔	Team full	Team full	Team full
Episode 11 (May 12)	Basta	4	«Вселиственный венок» / «А кто нас покрывать будет?»	Maria Lapshina	Polina Kuzmina	«Mon Dieu»	Team full	Team full	Team full	Team full

== Live shows ==
Colour key:

Artist was saved
Artist was eliminated

=== Week 1: Top 12 — Quarterfinal (May 19) ===
The Live Top 12 Quarterfinal comprised episode 12. The top twelve artists performed, with two artists from each team advancing based on the sum of the viewers' and coach's votes.

Episode	Coach	Order	Artist	Song	Coach's vote (/100%)	Public's vote (/100%)	Votes' sum	Result
Episode 12 (May 19) (Note: Basta is The best coach of episode 12.)	Polina Gagarina	1	Nadezhda Proskurina	«Ясный мой свет»	50%	13,6%	63,6%	Advanced
Episode 12 (May 19)	Polina Gagarina	2	Akhmed Akhmedov	«Arcade»	20%	15,7%	35,7%	Eliminated
Episode 12 (May 19)	Polina Gagarina	3	Viktoria Solomakhina	«Выше»	30%	70,7%	100,7%	Advanced
Episode 12 (May 19)	Basta	4	Maria Lapshina	«Туда»	30%	31,7%	61,7%	Eliminated
Episode 12 (May 19)	Basta	5	Pavel Zibrov	«На заре»	50%	25,3%	75,3%	Advanced
Episode 12 (May 19)	Basta	6	Lyudmila Serebryakova	«Белая песня»	20%	43%	63%	Advanced
Episode 12 (May 19)	Anton Belyaev	7	Nikolay Shcherba	«Я люблю тебя до слёз»	50%	25%	75%	Advanced
Episode 12 (May 19)	Anton Belyaev	8	Gulnara Bayguzina	«Missing»	30%	29,5%	59,5%	Eliminated
Episode 12 (May 19)	Anton Belyaev	9	Irina Syshchikova	«Не обижай меня»	20%	45,5%	65,5%	Advanced
Episode 12 (May 19)	Vladimir Presnyakov	10	Alina Bakhshalieva	«Ты где-то»	20%	20,6%	40,6%	Eliminated
Episode 12 (May 19)	Vladimir Presnyakov	11	Elmira Divaeva	«А на море белый песок»	50%	45,9%	95,9%	Advanced
Episode 12 (May 19)	Vladimir Presnyakov	12	Margarita Bagdasaryan	«Прощай»	30%	33,5%	63,5%	Advanced

=== Week 2: Top 8 — Semifinal (May 26) ===
The top eight artists performed on May 26, 2023, with one artist from each team advancing to the Final based on the sum of the viewers' and coach's votes

Episode	Coach	Order	Artist	Song	Coach's vote (/100%)	Public's vote (/100%)	Votes' sum	Result
Episode 13 (May 26) (Note: Basta is The best coach of episode 13.)	Anton Belyaev	1	Irina Syshchikova	"Луч солнца золотого"	60%	56,5%	116,5%	Advanced
Episode 13 (May 26)	Anton Belyaev	2	Nikolay Shcherba	"What Is Love"	40%	43,5%	83,5%	Eliminated
Episode 13 (May 26)	Basta	3	Pavel Zibrov	"Белые льдины"	40%	32,6%	72,6%	Eliminated
Episode 13 (May 26)	Basta	4	Lyudmila Serebryakova	"Улица роз"	60%	67,4%	127,4%	Advanced
Episode 13 (May 26)	Polina Gagarina	5	Nadezhda Proskurina	"All by Myself"	40%	30,3%	70,3%	Eliminated
Episode 13 (May 26)	Polina Gagarina	6	Viktoria Solomakhina	"Зима в сердце"	60%	69,7%	129,7%	Advanced
Episode 13 (May 26)	Vladimir Presnyakov	7	Margarita Bagdasaryan	"Половина сердца"	60%	26,7%	86,7%	Eliminated
Episode 13 (May 26)	Vladimir Presnyakov	8	Elmira Divaeva	"Зурбаган"	40%	73,3%	113,3%	Advanced

Trios
Order	Performer	Song
13.1	Leonid Agutin, Irina Syshchikova and Nikolay Shcherba	"Ты вернёшься когда-нибудь снова"
13.2	Anna Asti, Pavel Zibrov and Lyudmila Serebryakova	"Хобби"
13.3	Jony, Nadezhda Proskurina and Viktoria Solomakhina	"Никак"
13.4	Lolita, Margarita Bagdasaryan and Elmira Divaeva	"Шампанское"

=== Week 3: Final (June 2) ===
As like the previous seasons, the winner will be determined through public votes alone. The artist with the highest percentage of votes will be declared as the winner.

Viktoria Solomakhina was announced the winner, marking Polina Gagarina's second win as a coach. Polina Gagarina became the first female coach in the history of the Russian Voice to win more than one season.

Episode	Coach	Artist	Order	Duet Song (with Coach)	Order	Solo Song (no.1)	Order	Solo Song (no.2)	Result	
Episode 13 June 2)
Episode 13 June 2)	Basta	Lyudmila Serebryakova	1	«Обернись»	5	«Мой первый день»	«Я Буду Помнить»		Fourth place	
Episode 13 June 2)	Anton Belyaev	Irina Syshchikova	2	«My Love Is Like»	6	«Любовь настала»	9	«Ain't Nobody's Business»	Third Place	
Episode 13 June 2)	Vladimir Presnyakov	Elmira Divaeva	3	«Стюардесса по имени Жанна»	7	«The Best»	10	«Была любовь»	43,2%	Second place
Episode 13 June 2)	Polina Gagarina	Viktoria Solomakhina	4	«Колыбельная»	8	«Не молчи»	11	«Полёт на дельтаплане»	56,8%	Winner

== Best Coach ==
Colour key

- Best Coach
- Second place
- Third place
- Fourth place
- Episode's Best Coach

Coach	Public's vote _{(per episode)}														Result
Coach	#1	#2	#3	#4	#5	#6	#7	#8	#9	#10	#11	#12	#13	Av.	Result
Basta	40%	43%	49%	50%	45%	46%	53%	45%	45%	48%	48%	45%	49%	47%	Best coach
Polina Gagarina	32%	28%	21%	22%	24%	24%	17%	25%	21%	21%	22%	23%	21%	23%	Second place
Vladimir Presnyakov	19%	21%	17%	16%	20%	19%	21%	20%	24%	22%	21%	20%	20%	20%	Third place
Anton Belyaev	9%	8%	13%	12%	11%	11%	9%	10%	10%	9%	9%	12%	10%	10%	Fourth place
