= Piter FM =

- Official movie poster
- Directed by: Oksana Bychkova
- Written by: Oksana Bychkova; Nana Grinshtein
- Produced by: Alexander Rodnyansky
- Starring: Ekaterina Fedulova; Yevgeny Tsyganov; Alexey Barabash
- Cinematography: Ivan Gudkov
- Music by: Kirill Pirogov
- Release date: 20 April 2006
- Running time: 84 minutes
- Country: Russia
- Language: Russian

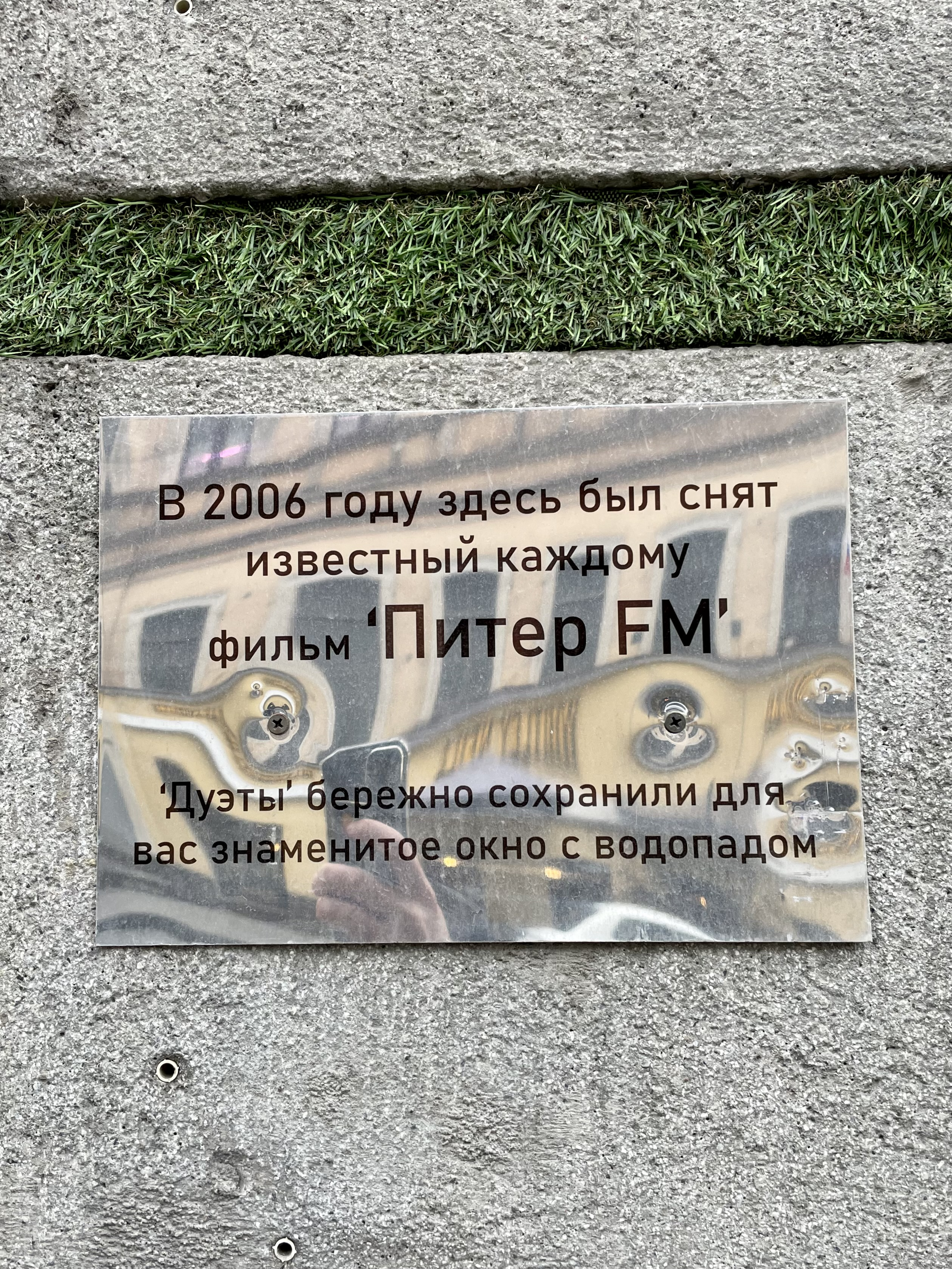
Plaque at filming site in Saint Petersburg

Piter FM (Russian: Питер ФМ) is a 2006 Russian romantic comedy-drama film directed by Oksana Bychkova and starring Ekaterina Fedulova, Yevgeny Tsyganov and Alexey Barabash. The plot revolves around the serendipitous and unexpected romance between a young man and woman living in St. Petersburg.

== Plot ==
Masha Yemelyanova works at a radio station called Piter FM in St. Petersburg, where she is both a DJ and the host of live radio programs, including a popular show in which residents can share their problems and try to find solutions together with her.

Maxim Vasilyev is a young architect by training who came to St. Petersburg from Nizhny Novgorod. He is working on his first independent projects and earns extra money as a janitor, which allows him to live in service housing.

Although they have never met, the two are similar in some ways: both are awkward in everyday life, constantly dropping or spilling things. Each is at an important turning point in his or her life. Masha is preparing to marry her former classmate Kostya, while Maxim has won an international competition for young architects and has been offered a five-year contract in Germany.

One day, they bump into each other in a crowd. Masha drops her mobile phone, which Maxim picks up. He wants to return it to its rightful owner, but the two are unable to meet—sometimes Maxim is summoned by his boss, while at other times he is stopped by the police.

Life repeatedly brings Masha and Maxim face to face on the streets of the city, but, unaware of each other's identity, they keep passing one another. At times, however, they turn around and look back at the stranger—a man at the woman, and a woman at the man—drawn to each other for reasons they cannot explain. This connection also begins to emerge in their conversations, as Masha occasionally calls her own phone, whose battery is gradually running out.

The two young people talk extensively, eventually switching to the informal form of address and gradually influencing each other's lives. Masha begins to realize that agreeing to marry Kostya, whom she has known since childhood and who is familiar and close to her but whom she does not love, was a hasty decision. Maxim, meanwhile, realizes that he does not want to move to Berlin. Eventually, both resolve their doubts. Masha breaks off her engagement with Kostya, while Maxim refuses to sign the contract and decides to remain in St. Petersburg.

While trying once again to arrange a meeting, Maxim accidentally drops Masha's phone into the Fontanka River. He then realizes that his last real opportunity to contact “the girl named Masha in the red jacket who lost her mobile phone” is to call the live broadcast of the radio station Piter FM.

== Cast ==
- Ekaterina Fedulova as Masha
- Yevgeny Tsyganov as Maksim
- Alexey Barabash as Kostya
- Irina Rakhmanova as Lera
- Natalya Reva-Ryadinskaya as Marina
- Oleg Dolin as Fedor
- Yevgeny Kulakov as Vitya
- Kirill Pirogov as Gleb
- Aleksandr Bashirov as building manager
- Vladimir Mashkov as man in slippers
- Tatyana Kravchenko as Tatyana Petrovna
- Pavel Barshak as guy with flowers
- Andrey Krasko man in shorts

== Reception ==
Piter FM received generally positive reviews.

Nikita Shabanov, in his article about the film for Kino Mail, called it a “cultural symbol of a generation” and an “urban legend”: “Piter FM remains a rare example of a film that does not grow old. It is associated not only with a specific period, but also with the feeling of youth, when the whole city seems like a route leading to love.”

Nastasya Gorbachevskaya of Film.ru noted that the St. Petersburg depicted in the film is a city that never existed: “It is very comfortable and sweet to feel nostalgic for Bychkova’s Petersburg. There is no gloom, grayness, traffic jams, or complaints about municipal services.” She described the film as “not exactly a cult film, but rather a popular one,” noting that what attracts viewers and evokes nostalgia is “not only the material world and familiar rosy faces, but the genuine feeling of an unstoppable life, changeable yet breathing deeply.”

Masha’s line, “Everything will be fine, I checked,” became one of the most recognizable phrases associated with the film. The line quickly became popular and gained widespread public affection.

== Awards ==
Piter FM was nominated for 6 different awards at the MTV Russia Movie Awards, 2007.

Award	Category	Nominee	Result
MTV Russia Movie Awards, 2007	Best Soundtrack	Gorod 312 (Out of Range)	Won
MTV Russia Movie Awards, 2007	Best Actress	Ekaterina Fedulova	Won
MTV Russia Movie Awards, 2007	Best Film		Nominated
MTV Russia Movie Awards, 2007	Best Actor	Yevgeny Tsyganov	Nominated
MTV Russia Movie Awards, 2007	Best Comedic Performance	Vladimir Mashkov	Nominated
MTV Russia Movie Awards, 2007	Breakthrough of the Year	Ekaterina Fedulova	Nominated
