= Dmitry Maryanov =

Soviet and Russian theater and film actor

- Born: Dmitry Maryanov; 1 December 1969; Moscow, RSFSR, Soviet Union
- Died: 15 October 2017 (aged 47); Lobnya, Moscow Oblast, Russia
- Occupation: Actor
- Years active: 1986–2017

Dmitry Yuryevich Maryanov (Russian: Дмитрий Юрьевич Марьянов; 1 December 1969 – 15 October 2017) was a Soviet and Russian theater and film actor, TV presenter. He appeared in the first season of ice show contest Ice Age.

== Filmography ==
- 1986 — Higher Than Rainbow as Alik Raduga
- 1988 — Dear Yelena Sergeyevna as Pasha
- 1991 — Love as Vadim
- 1996 — What a Wonderful Game as Lev
- 1997 — Snake Spring
- 1999 — The President and His Granddaughter
- 2002 — Theatrical Novel as Foma Strizh
- 2005 — The Fall of the Empire as Bredel
- 2008 — Radio Day as DJ Dim
- 2014 — Heavenly Court as Krasavets
