= The Lover (2002 film) =

- Russian: Любовник
- Directed by: Valery Todorovsky
- Written by: Gennadiy Ostrovsky
- Produced by: Aleksandr Akopov; Maksim Koroptsov; Ilya Neretin
- Starring: Oleg Yankovsky; Sergey Garmash; Andrey Smirnov; Vera Voronkova; Vladimir Yumatov
- Cinematography: Sergey Mikhalchuk
- Edited by: Vera Kruglova
- Music by: Alexei Aigui
- Release date: 2002
- Country: Russia
- Language: Russian

The Lover (Russian: Любовник) is a 2002 Russian drama film directed by Valery Todorovsky.

== Plot ==
The film tells about two men, one of whom is a linguist, and the second is a retired military man, who are united by love for one woman.

== Cast ==
- Oleg Yankovsky as Charyshev
- Sergey Garmash as Ivan
- Andrey Smirnov as Petya
- Vera Voronkova as Vera
- Vladimir Yumatov as Adik
- Elena Laskavaya as Verbitskaya (as Elena Laskovaya)
- Valeriy Prokhorov as Conductor
- Irina Sokolova as Sima
- Irina Kartashyova as Liza (as Irina Kartashova)
- Pavel Adamchikov
- Aleksandr Brankevich
