= Sofia Sotnichevskaya =

Soviet and Russian theatre actress (1916–2011)

Sofia Sotnichevskaya Honored Artist of the RSFSR
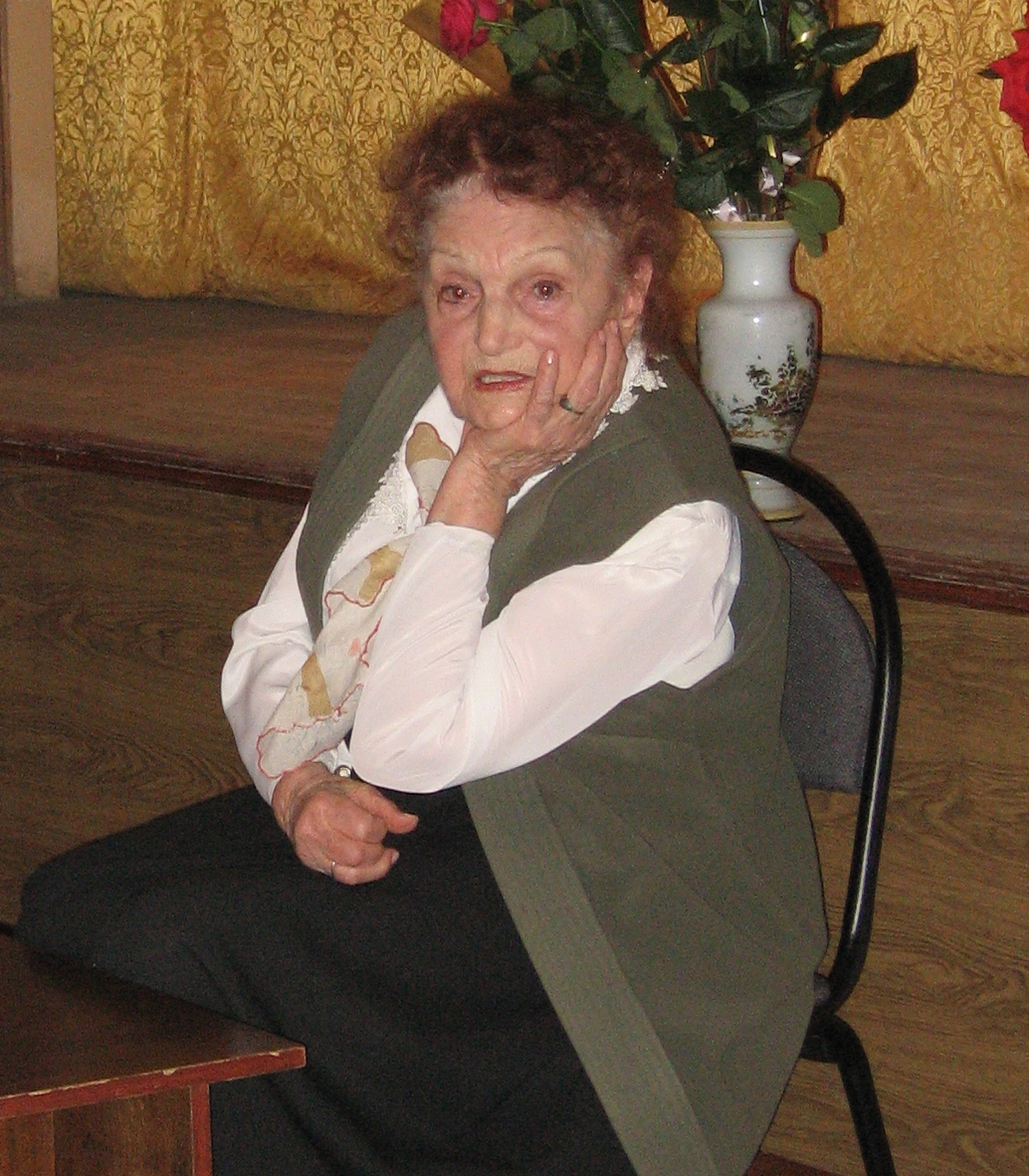
- Sotnichevskaya in 2010
- Born: Sofia Vladimirovna Sotnichevskaya; 8 May 1916; Petrograd, Russian Empire
- Died: December 12, 2011 (aged 95); Tula, Russia
- Occupation: Actress
- Years active: 1940 – 2008

Sofia Vladimirovna Sotnichevskaya (Russian: Софья Владимировна Сотничевская, 8 May 1916 – 12 December 2011) is a Soviet and Russian theatre actress.

Sotnichevskaya was born in Petrograd. In 1940, she graduated from Voronezh Teatral College. From 1964 to 2003 she was an actress of the Tula Academic Theatre. In 1962, she was named a Honored Artist of the RSFSR. Actress was married to theater artist Vladimir Grigorievich Schildkret (1907–1976).

Sotnichevskaya died on 12 December 2011, aged 95, in Tula. She was buried in Tula in Smolenskoye Cemetery.
