= True (film) =

- Theatrical release poster
- Directed by: Tom Tykwer
- Written by: Tom Tykwer
- Starring: Natalie Portman; Melchior Beslon
- Cinematography: Frank Griebe
- Edited by: Mathilde Bonnefoy
- Production companies: X Filme Creative Pool; Novem Productions
- Distributed by: X Verleih AG (through Warner Bros.)
- Release dates: 6 February 2004 (54th Berlinale); 12 February 2004 (Germany)
- Running time: 10 minutes
- Countries: Germany; Liechtenstein; France
- Languages: French; English

True is a 2004 short film directed by Tom Tykwer, starring Natalie Portman and Melchior Beslon. The film was filmed for 2006 anthology film Paris, je t'aime. On February 6, 2004, it independently premiered at the 54th Berlin International Film Festival, where it competed for the Silver Bear for Best Short Film. It won the German Short Film Award (Deutscher Kurzfilmpreis) in 2004. Afterwards, it was cut down the running time and completed as a segment "Faubourg-Saint-Denis" of "Paris, je t'aime".

== Cast ==
- Natalie Portman as Francine
- Melchior Beslon as Thomas
