= My Little Wife =

- Directed by: Raimundas Banionis
- Written by: Rimantas Šavelis
- Starring: Saulius Balandis; Ingeborga Dapkūnaitė
- Cinematography: Algimantas Mikutėnas
- Edited by: Vanda Survilienė
- Music by: Faustas Latėnas
- Release date: 1984
- Running time: 75 min
- Country: Soviet Union
- Languages: Lithuanian, Russian

My Little Wife (Lithuanian: Mano mažytė žmona, Russian: Моя маленькая жена) is a 1984 Soviet romantic drama film directed by Raimundas Banionis.

== Plot ==
Student Linas meets with Rūta, who claims to be the daughter of the vice-rector of the institute. Events develop in such a way that Linas, who started classes is forced to go to the apartment to the professor and ask the girl for help, which leads to the discovery of Rūta's deception. He learns that her parents are drunk and down people, Linas decides to marry the girl. He is transferred to the evening department to be able to work and help his wife study to be a zoologist.

== Cast ==
- Saulius Balandis as Linas Tamonis
- Ingeborga Dapkūnaitė as Aukse
- Eleonora Koriznaitė as Rūta
- Juozas Marcinkevičius as Vytas
- Linas Paugis as Tomas
- Vytautas Paukštė as Pranas Norvilas
- Arūnas Sakalauskas as Staselis
- Galina Dauguvietytė as Ramanauskienė
