= Oksana Bychkova =

Russian film director, screenwriter

- Born: June 18, 1972 (age 54); Donetsk, Ukraine (Soviet Union)
- Occupations: Film director, screenwriter

Oksana Olegovna Bychkova (born 18 June 1972, Donetsk) is a Russian film director and screenwriter.

== Early life and education ==
Oksana Bychkova was born in Donetsk, but grew up on Sakhalin. After finishing school, she entered the Department of Journalism at Rostov State University, graduating in 1995.

== Career ==
She worked as a radio journalist. In 2000, having moved to Moscow, Bychkova entered the Advanced Directing Courses (workshop of Pyotr Todorovsky). Her first feature film was her own script, Piter FM (2006), which won a prize at the Vyborg Film Festival Window to Europe.

In 2008, Bychkova’s second film Plus One was released. It won the award for Best Actor (Jethro Skinner) at the Kinotavr film festival and the Grand Golden Rook prize at the Vyborg Film Festival. Also in 2008, she directed one of the four shorts (Recording) in the anthology Because It’s Me.

Her fourth film Another Year (a loose adaptation of Alexander Volodin's play Do Not Part with Your Beloveds) won the main award, the Big Screen Award, at the second-tier competition of the International Film Festival Rotterdam.

== Public stance ==
In March 2014, she signed the We Are With You! letter of the Russian Film Union in support of Ukraine.

In February 2022, she signed the open letter of the Russian Film Union against the military invasion of Ukraine.

== Filmography ==
=== Director ===
- 2006 — Piter FM
- 2008 — Plus One
- 2008 — Recording
- 2009 — Churchill
- 2011 — Revelations
- 2011 — Zhanna
- 2014 — Another Year
- 2014 — Defense
- 2016 — St. Petersburg. Only for Love
- 2016 — Dad’s Ship
- 2018 — Badger.
- 2020 — What Slava Wants?
- 2022 — Dzhondjoli

=== Screenwriter ===
- 2006 — Piter FM
- 2008 — Plus One
- 2008 — Recording
- 2014 — Defense
- 2016 — St. Petersburg. Only for Love

== Awards and recognition ==
- 2006 — Silver Rook for Best Debut at the Window to Europe film festival (Piter FM)
- 2007 — Nominated for Nika Award in the category Discovery of the Year (Piter FM)
- 2008 — Grand Golden Rook at the Vyborg Film Festival audience vote (Plus One)
- 2014 — International Film Festival Rotterdam — Big Screen Award (Another Year)
- 2014 — Provincial Russia Film Festival (Yeisk) — Grand Prize and Best Director Award (Another Year)
