= Madlen Dzhabrailova =

Russian actress

- Born: Madlen Rasmiyevna Dzhabrailova; 19 December 1970 (age 55); Moscow
- Occupation: Actress
- Parent: Rasmi Djabrailov (father)

Madlen Rasmiyevna Dzhabrailova (Russian: Мадле́н Ра́смиевна Джабраи́лова) is a Russian actress, Merited Artist of the Russian Federation. She appeared in over 40 films.

== Biography ==
Madlen Dzhabrailova was born December 19, 1970 in Moscow, into the family of the Honored Artist of Russia Rasmi Djabrailov.

She graduated French language school. Then she studied at the director`s department of GITIS, after which she began to play in the Moscow theater Workshop of Pyotr Fomenko. Since 1986 she has been acting in films.

== Selected filmography ==
| Year | Title | Role | Notes |
|---|---|---|---|
| 2003 | The Stroll | gypsy on the tram | |
| 2006 | Euphoria | Lidiya | |
| 2008 | Plus One | Mariya | |
| 2010 | Fortress of War | Katya | |
| 2020 | Call-center | Jemma's mother | |
| 2021 | A Portrait of a Stranger | Nelli | |
