= Pyotr Fomenko =

Soviet film director (1932–2012)

- Пётр Фоменко
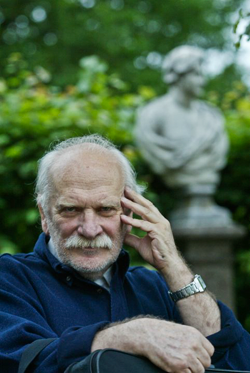
- Born: Pyotr Naumovich Fomenko; 13 July 1932; Moscow, Soviet Union
- Died: 9 August 2012 (aged 80); Moscow, Russia
- Resting place: Vagankovo Cemetery, Moscow
- Occupations: Theatre director, film director, theatre teacher
- Years active: 1958–2012

Pyotr Naumovich Fomenko (Russian: Пётр Нау́мович Фоме́нко; 13 July 1932 – 9 August 2012) was a Soviet and Russian film and theatre director, teacher, artistic director of the Moscow theater Pyotr Fomenko Workshop. Created 60 productions in theatres in Moscow, Saint Petersburg, Tbilisi, Wrocław, Salzburg and Paris.

Fomenko's directing style involves the use of ironic comparison between contrasting episodes. His works include theatrical and musical elements and feature actor ensembles.

In a number of productions of the late 1970s – early 1980s, Fomenko has experimented in the genre of tragic grotesque.

Television productions are peculiar director in-depth psychology, strict adherence to the idea of the author's and style ю

In 2000 he taught at the Paris Conservatoire, then staged performances at the Comédie Française (2003).

In 2001 he released the last course students. In 2003 he left the department in directing RATI (GITIS) and the official left the theatre pedagogy, which has given more than 20 years of life. Among the students Fomenko directors Sergei Zhenovach, Ivan Popovski, Oleg Rybkin, Elena Nevezhina, Vladimir Epifantsev, Mindaugas Karbauskis, Sergei Puskepalis, Alexey Burago, Nikolay Druchek, the actors Igor Ugolnikov, Galina Tyunina, sisters Polina and Ksenia Kutepova, Madlen Dzhabrailova, Polina Agureeva, Andrei Kazakov, Kirill Pirogov, Ilya Lyubimov, Yevgeny Tsyganov.

He died in Moscow on 9 August 2012 and was buried on 13 August in Vagankovo Cemetery.

== Honours and awards ==
- Honored Worker of Culture of Poland (1979).
- Honored Artist of the RSFSR (1987) – for services to the Soviet theatrical art.
- People's Artist of the Russian Federation (1993).
- State Prize of the Russian Federation (1994, 1997, 2001).
- Golden Mask (1995, 2002, 2006).
- Crystal Turandot (1993).
- Order For Merit to the Fatherland 2nd (2007), 3rd (2003), 4th (1996) class.
- Ordre des Arts et des Lettres (2005).
