= The Bridge (Russian TV series) =

Estonian-Russian crime drama television series

- Russian title card
- Russian: Мост
- Estonian: Sild
- Genre: Crime drama Serial drama
- Based on: Broen/Bron by Hans Rosenfeldt; Måns Mårlind; Björn Stein
- Developed by: Konstantin Statskiy
- Starring: Mikhail Porechenkov; Ingeborga Dapkūnaitė
- Countries of origin: Russia; Estonia
- Original languages: Russian; Estonian
- No. of seasons: 2
- No. of episodes: 20

Production
- Executive producers: Timur Weinstein; Yulia Sumacheva
- Production locations: Ivangorod; Narva; Saint-Petersburg; Tallinn
- Running time: 50 minutes
- Production companies: Endemol Shine; Weitmedia; NTV TV3 Group

Original release
- Network: NTV; TV3
- Release: May 21, 2018 – July 24, 2020

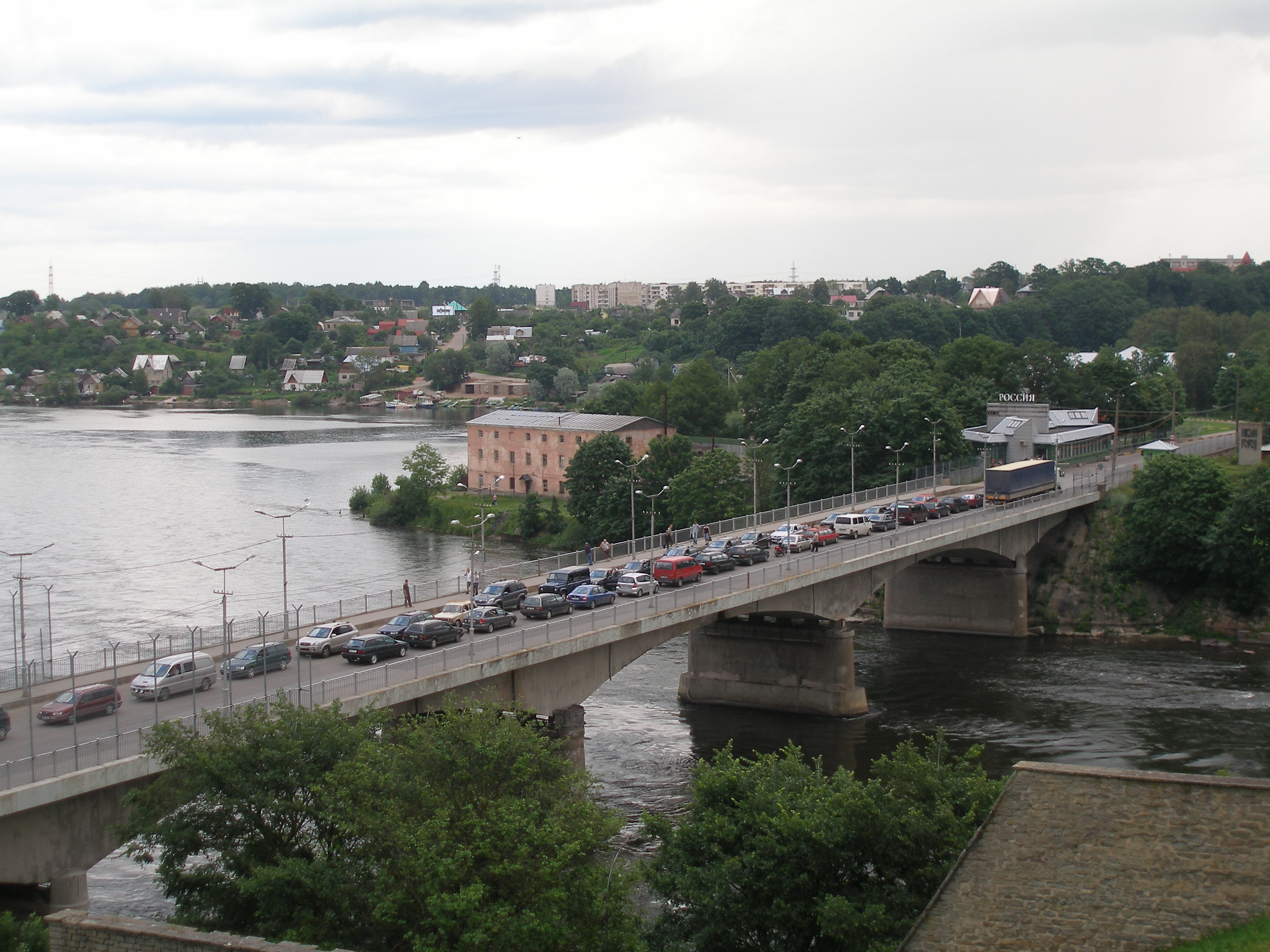
The Bridge

The Bridge (Russian: Мост; Most, Estonian: Sild) is an Estonian-Russian crime drama television series, based on the Danish-Swedish series Broen/Bron (The Bridge). It stars Lithuanian actress Ingeborga Dapkūnaitė and Russian actor Mikhail Porechenkov in the lead roles, and was broadcast in both Estonian and Russian languages.

The first series was aired on the Russian NTV Channel during the spring of 2018 on TV3 in Estonia in 2019. The complete series consists of two seasons of 10 episodes each.

== Plot ==
The story takes place on the Russian and Estonian border where a murdered body on a bridge between Narva and Ivangorod (the Friendship Bridge (Narva) on the Russo-Estonian border over the Narva River) and brings together Narva detective, Inga Veermaa, who is mentored by Saint-Petersburg detective Maksim Kazantsev. The police forces of the two countries investigating the incident find that the upper part of the corpse belongs to a politician from Estonia and the lower part to a student from St. Petersburg.

Gradually, as they investigate a series of crimes that are well prepared and skillfully executed, Inga and Maksim understand that the perpetrator is posing as a fighter for the truth. Together they contain a "message" to society on the subject of social injustice. At the heart of the action is the motive of personal revenge, while the main enemy is Maksim himself.

== Cast ==
- Ingeborga Dapkūnaitė as Detective Chief Inspector Inga Veermaa
- Mikhail Porechenkov as Detective Maksim Kazantsev
- Mariya Skuratova as Lena
- Alyona Kuchkova as Sveta
- Yury Kovalev as Nikolai
- Denis Portnov as doctor
- Yury Utkin as Poletaev
- Dmitry Novikov as owner of a strip club
- Igor Papylev as reporter
- Stanislav Nikolaev
- Daniil Kokin
- Sofya Mironova as girl hostage

== Production ==
Sild was developed by Konstantin Statskiy, broadcast on the NTV network in Russia and TV3 in Estonia, and based on the Danish-Swedish series Broen/Bron.

The show stars Lithuanian actress Ingeborga Dapkūnaitė as the Estonian police detective Inga Veermaa and Russian actor Mikhail Porechenkov as her Russian counterpart Maksim Kazantsev. Dapkūnaitė's character was originally called Inga Savisaar.

== Release ==
The series debuted on NTV in the Russian Federation in 2018, also on TV3 in Estonia in 2019.

The second series premiered on May 22, 2020. The final episode was posted on July 24, 2020 and ended with a cliffhanger.

== Series overview ==
The complete series consists of two seasons of 10 episodes each.

| Series | Episodes | Originally released | | |
| Series | Episodes | First released | Last released | Network |
|---|---|---|---|---|
| 1 | 10 | 21 May 2018 | 25 May 2018 | NTV |
| 2 | 10 | 22 May 2020 | 24 July 2020 | NTV |
