= Orange Juice (film) =

- Film poster
- Russian: Апельсиновый сок
- Directed by: Andrey Proshkin
- Written by: Maksim Fedoseyev
- Produced by: Maksim Fedoseyev
- Starring: Ingeborga Dapkunaite; Mikhail Kozakov; Lada Maris; Andrey Panin; Aleksandra Skachkova
- Cinematography: Vadim Yusov
- Music by: Mark Erman
- Release date: November 4, 2010
- Country: Russia
- Language: Russian

Orange Juice (Russian: Апельсиновый сок) is a 2010 Russian comedy-drama film directed by Andrey Proshkin.

== Plot ==
The film takes place in a summer cottage in the Moscow Region, in which three people live: the American millionaire Stephen, the young doctor Egor and the nurse Stephen, whose life turns into a real nightmare. Despite her strength and independent nature, she is forced to do what he asks, because she needs money, as a result of which many funny situations occur with them.

== Cast ==
- Ingeborga Dapkunaite
- Mikhail Kozakov
- Lada Maris
- Andrey Panin
- Aleksandra Skachkova
- Olga Yakovleva
- Aleksandr Yatsenko
