= Dear Yelena Sergeyevna =

- Directed by: Eldar Ryazanov
- Written by: Eldar Ryazanov; Lyudmila Razumovskaya
- Produced by: Leonid Vereshchagin
- Starring: Marina Neyolova; Natalia Shchukina; Dmitry Maryanov
- Cinematography: Vadim Alisov
- Music by: Gennadi Aleksandrov
- Production company: Mosfilm
- Release date: 12 April 1988
- Running time: 94 minutes
- Country: Soviet Union
- Language: Russian

Dear Yelena Sergeyevna (Russian: Дорогая Елена Сергеевна, romanized: Dorogaya Yelena Sergeyevna) is a 1988 Soviet crime thriller film directed by Eldar Ryazanov. The film is based on an eponymous play by Lyudmila Razumovskaya.

== Plot ==
Graduating students from class 10B visit their math teacher, Elena Sergeevna, on her birthday—not out of kindness or concern for her loneliness, nor because her mother is ill, but because they know she holds the key to a safe containing their exam papers. Each student has a personal reason for wanting to "correct" their poor grades and justify their actions, though they all grapple with pangs of conscience. As tensions rise, each student reveals a darker side, showing just how far they are willing to go for better grades.

Despite her gentle and kind nature, Elena Sergeevna firmly refuses to hand over the key, enduring their taunts as she tries to remind them of the values they were taught as children. A verbal battle ensues, with the students arguing that their generation faces a harsher reality than hers, where the idealized Soviet "happy present" is gone, and corruption permeates even higher education. In the end, the contested key remains untouched in Elena Sergeevna's apartment, leaving no true victors in this moral confrontation.

== Cast ==
- Marina Neyolova as Yelena Sergeevna, teacher
- Natalia Shchukina as Lyalya, Yelena Sergeevna's schoolgirl
- Dmitry Maryanov as Pasha, Yelena Sergeevna's schoolboy (voice by Andrey Tashkov)
- Fedor Dunaevsky as Vityok, Yelena Sergeevna's schoolboy
- Andrey Tikhomirnov as Volodya, Yelena Sergeevna's schoolboy (voice by Oleg Menshikov)
- Eldar Ryazanov as Yelena Sergeevna's neighbour
