= Love (1991 Soviet film) =

- Russian: Любовь
- Directed by: Valery Todorovsky
- Written by: Valery Todorovsky
- Produced by: Sergey Kozlov; Sergey Livnev; Valery Todorovsky; Igor Tolstunov
- Starring: Yevgeny Mironov; Natalya Petrova; Dmitry Maryanov; Tatyana Skorokhodova; Natalya Vilkina
- Cinematography: Ilya Dyomin
- Edited by: Alla Strelnikova
- Music by: Vyacheslav Nazarov
- Release date: 1991
- Country: Soviet Union
- Language: Russian

Love (Russian: Любовь) is a 1991 Soviet romance film directed by Valery Todorovsky.

== Plot ==
Vadim and Sasha, two friends and university students, are each on their own quest for love. Vadim is a bold ladies' man, while Sasha is a modest and inexperienced romantic. At a party, they each meet someone: Vadim starts seeing Marina, the granddaughter of a general, who lives with her grandmother in a spacious apartment in central Moscow. Meanwhile, Sasha falls for Masha, a Jewish girl. Ultimately, Vadim ends up getting married, while Sasha faces heartbreak as Masha decides to emigrate to Israel with her parents and grandmother.

== Cast ==
- Yevgeny Mironov as Sasha
- Natalya Petrova as Mariya
- Dmitry Maryanov as Vadim
- Tatyana Skorokhodova as Marina
- Natalya Vilkina
- Inna Slobodskaya
- Vija Artmane
- Lev Durov
- Anatoli Popolzukhin
- Raisa Ryazanova
