= Katya Ismailova =

- Russian: Подмосковные вечера
- Directed by: Valery Todorovsky
- Written by: Stanislav Govorukhin; François Guérif; Alla Krinitsyna; Marina Sheptunova; Cécile Vargaftig
- Produced by: Aleksandr Gnedenko; Marc Ruscart; Igor Tolstunov; Mikhail Zonenashvili
- Starring: Vladimir Mashkov; Ingeborga Dapkunaite; Aleksandr Feklistov; Alisa Freindlich; Natalya Shchukina
- Cinematography: Sergei Kozlov
- Edited by: Yelena Gagarina Alla Strelnikova
- Music by: Leonid Desyatnikov
- Release date: 1994
- Countries: Russia; France
- Language: Russian

Katya Ismailova (Russian: Подмосковные вечера, romanized: Podmoskovnyye vechera) is a 1994 Russian drama film directed by Valery Todorovsky. It is based on the novella Lady Macbeth of the Mtsensk District by Nikolai Leskov.

== Plot ==
The film tells about a woman who for the first time in her life felt passion and as a result became uncontrollable.

== Cast ==
- Vladimir Mashkov as Sergey / Katya's lover
- Ingeborga Dapkunaite as Katya / Wife
- Aleksandr Feklistov as Mitya / Husband
- Alisa Freindlich as Irina / mother
- Natalya Shchukina as Sonya / Sergey's ex-lover
- Yury Kuznetsov as Romanov / investigator
- Avangard Leontev as Editor
- Marina Opyonkina
- E. Vakhovshaia
- S. Razguliaeva
