= Higher Than Rainbow =

1986 Soviet television film

- Written by: Georgi Yungvald-Khilkevich; Sergey Abramov
- Directed by: Georgi Yungvald-Khilkevich
- Starring: Dmitry Maryanov; Olga Mashnaya; Galina Polskikh
- Music by: Yury Chernavsky
- Country of origin: Soviet Union
- Original language: Russian

Production
- Cinematography: Arkadi Povzner
- Running time: 128 min.
- Production company: Odessa Film Studio

Original release
- Release: 1986

Higher Than Rainbow or (Russian: Выше радуги, romanized: Vyshe radugi) is a 1986 Soviet television musical film directed by Georgi Yungvald-Khilkevich.

== Plot ==
Schoolboy Alik Raduga (“Rainbow”) lives in a creative family (his father is a musician and composer, mother is a choreographer) which has made him a dreamer and a poet. Studying is very easy for Alik, but there is one problem: Rainbow is not able to jump high, and therefore is among the worst in gym class.

In his fantasies Alik floats on the table like a gondola on the sea and communicates with the Siren, who suddenly offers Raduga to fulfill his innermost desire. Without hesitating, Alik asks to be gifted with the ability to jump up at any height. Siren performs the boy's request, but stipulates one condition: if Raduga ever tells a single lie, the gift will disappear immediately!

Endowed with the magic force Alik becomes a hit in gym class. The overwhelmed teacher immediately sends Raduga to the athletics sports team. But wanting to bail out a girl whom Alik loves, Raduga lies, the gift disappears and now Alik can not even jump through a straw ...

The situation could be remedied by using the help of Ivan Ivanovich. This is the legendary Ivan the Fool, whom the evil witch turned into a stump. During his walks, Alik finds this stump, carves a wooden figure from it, and thus revives Ivan Ivanovich. They have a lot of fun talking and Ivan Ivanovich constantly offers to help Raduga. But Alik decides to reach the heights of sport by himself, with the help of tedious training rather than magical power ...

== Cast ==
- Dmitry Maryanov – Alik Raduga (voice by Dmitry Kharatyan, singing by Vladimir Presnyakov Jr.)
- Mikhail Boyarsky – Alik's father
- Elena Aminova – Alik's mother
- Ekaterina Parfyonova – Dasha, Alik's classmate (singing by Victoria Vradiy)
- Yuri Kuklachev – Ivan Ivanovich (voice by Mikhail Kononov)
- Olga Mashnaya – Butyrina Irina Mikhailovna (BIM), physical training teacher (voice by Olga Gromova)
- Tatiana Basova – Svetlana Mikhailovna, history teacher / Siren (voice by Inga Tretyakova, singing by Alla Pugacheva)
- Galina Polskikh – Alexandra Ilinichna, coach
- Anatoliy Krasnik – Borshev, Alik's classmate
- Yuri Khoroshilov – Fokin, Alik's classmate
- Elena Popova – Lenochka
- Yuri Rudchenko – foreman
- Yuri Senkevich – cameo
- Rait Ozols – Valery Paschenko

== Soundtrack ==
The film became very popular in the Soviet Union because of the numerous musical numbers (songwriters composer Yury Chernavsky and poet Leonid Derbenyov), directed in the music video format, and it is with this film began the popularity of Vladimir Presnyakov Jr., who sung all of the protagonist's songs. Several songs were performed by Mikhail Boyarsky, and one of the songs by Alla Pugacheva.

- "Siren" (Сирена) - Alla Pugacheva
- "The Cat in the bag" (Кот в мешке) - Vladimir Presnyakov Jr.
- "Only once" (Только раз) - Mikhail Boyarsky
- "Photographer" (Фотограф) - Vladimir Presnyakov Jr., on the record, Mikhail Boyarsky.
- "Song of the deaf pirate" (Песня глухого пирата) - Mikhail Boyarsky
- "Zurbagan" (Зурбаган) - Vladimir Presnyakov Jr.
- "Glass World" (Стеклянный мир) - Michael Boyarsky, Victoria Vradiy
- "Islands" (Острова) - Vladimir Presnyakov Jr.

The song "Zurbagan" refers to the city of the same name in the fantasy world of Grinlandia in the novels and short stories of Alexander Grin.
