= Temptation (2007 film) =

- Russian: Искушение
- Directed by: Sergey Ashkenazi
- Written by: Sergey Ashkenazi
- Produced by: Aleksandr Bokovikov; Olga Kostina; Sergey Sendyk
- Starring: Sergey Makovetsky; Ekaterina Fedulova; Ilya Iosifov; Svetlana Ivanova; Ivan Stebunov
- Cinematography: Artur Gimpel
- Edited by: Artur Gimpel
- Music by: Alexey Ashkenazy
- Release date: 2007
- Country: Russia
- Language: Russian

Temptation (Russian: Искушение, romanized: Iskusheniye) is a 2007 Russian drama film directed by Sergey Ashkenazi.

== Plot ==
Andrei's stepbrother, whom he saw only once, died. Andrew is trying to understand the cause of his brother’s death. Was it an accident or suicide?

== Cast ==
- Sergey Makovetsky as Igor
- Ekaterina Fedulova as Genya
- Ilya Iosifov as Sasha
- Svetlana Ivanova as Anya
- Ivan Stebunov as Andrey
