= Plus One (2008 film) =

- Film poster
- Russian: Плюс один
- Directed by: Oksana Bychkova
- Written by: Oksana Bychkova; Nana Greenstein
- Produced by: Elena Glickman
- Starring: Madlen Dzhabrailova; Jethro Skinner
- Cinematography: Ivan Gudkov
- Production company: Telesto
- Release date: June 20, 2008
- Running time: 96 minutes
- Country: Russia
- Language: Russian
- Box office: $927,277

Plus One (Russian: Плюс один, romanized: Plyus odin) is a Russian romantic comedy film directed by Oksana Bychkova, released in 2008.

== Plot ==
Masha (Madeleine Dzhabrailova), an English-Russian translator, accompanies puppeteer Tom (Jethro Skinner) from the UK to Moscow, where he has been hired to conduct master classes with young actors of the puppet theater.

Masha and Tom seem to have very little in common. Masha is very serious about life and what people think about it, whereas Tom perceives the world as a theater play. However, both have lonely lives; Masha loves her dictionaries, and Tom's sole companion is a doll-glove, which he carries with him always. Their mutual isolation from the world draws them together and they fall in love. When it is time to leave, Masha is able to let go of Tom easily, for she now feels ready to start a new life.

== Cast ==
- Madlen Dzhabrailova
- Jethro Skinner
- Yevgeny Tsyganov
- Pavel Derevyanko
- Yuri Kolokolnikov
- Alexander Adabashyan
- Miriam Sehon
- Miroslava Karpovich
- Andrey Merzlikin
- Sergei Druzyak
- Vladimir Ilyin
- Sergei Frolov

== Awards ==
- Jethro Skinner — Award for Best Actor at the Open Russian Film Festival Kinotavr
- Madeleine Dzhabrailova — Award for Best Actress at the IX Open Russian Festival Smile, Russia!
- Audience Award at the 2008 Window to Europe Film Festival
