= In Two =

- Genre: Romantic drama
- Written by: Vsevolod Benigsen; Valery Todorovsky
- Directed by: Valery Todorovsky
- Starring: Danila Kozlovsky; Alexander Petrov; Irina Starshenbaum; Elizaveta Bazykina; Anna Sinyakina
- Composer: Anna Drubich
- Country of origin: Russia
- Original language: Russian
- No. of seasons: 1
- No. of episodes: 9

Production
- Executive producer: Elena Gorbunova
- Producers: Valery Todorovsky; Vyacheslav Murugov; Anton Zlatopolsky; Anastasia Biryukova; Maksim Koroptsov; Maksim Rybakov; Zhora Kryzhovnikov
- Cinematography: Sergey Kozlov
- Running time: 49–57 minutes
- Production company: Valery Todorovsky Production Company

Original release
- Network: more.tv Wink; Russia-1
- Release: October 3 – November 21, 2022

In Two (Russian: Надвое, romanized: Nadvoye) is a Russian romantic drama television series directed by Valery Todorovsky. The series was produced by Valery Todorovsky Production Company on commission from NMG Studio and VGTRK.

The premiere was originally scheduled for 29 September 2022 on the streaming platforms more.tv and Wink, but was postponed to 3 October 2022 following the Izhevsk school shooting. The television broadcast later took place on the channel Russia-1.

== Plot ==
Two Moscow colleagues travel to Saint Petersburg on a business trip. Kostya, a serious man who has long been married, meets Ira, a carefree party girl, while the witty bachelor Sanya develops feelings for Nastya, a cellist. New encounters in another city change their lives, dividing them in two.

== Cast ==
=== Main ===
- Danila Kozlovsky as Kostya
- Alexander Petrov as Sanya
- Irina Starshenbaum as Ira
- Elizaveta Bazykina as Nastya
- Anna Sinyakina as Liza, Kostya’s wife

=== Supporting ===
- Andrey Tashkov as the boss
- Sergey Yatsenyuk as the investigator
- Elena Smirnova as Ira’s grandmother
- Anastasia Volynskaya as Galya
- Alexey Fateev as Andrey, a surgeon
- Valery Yaryomenko as Starodubtsev, a director
- Nina Gizbrekht as Vera
- Sergey Vlasov as Sanya’s father
- Svetlana Fleites as a wedding guest

== Production ==
Filming began in April 2021 and concluded in July 2021. The series was shot in Moscow and Saint Petersburg and completed in just over two months, spanning 64 shooting days.

For Elizaveta Bazykina, In Two marked her acting debut. The series was also the first joint project featuring Danila Kozlovsky and Alexander Petrov.

The project is dedicated to the memory of Valery Todorovsky’s wife, actress Evgeniya Brik, who died in February 2022.

The first episode opened the IV Pilot TV Series Festival and was screened on 15 July 2022 in Ivanovo.
