= Valery Todorovsky =

Russian film director, screenwriter and TV producer

- Валерий Тодоровский
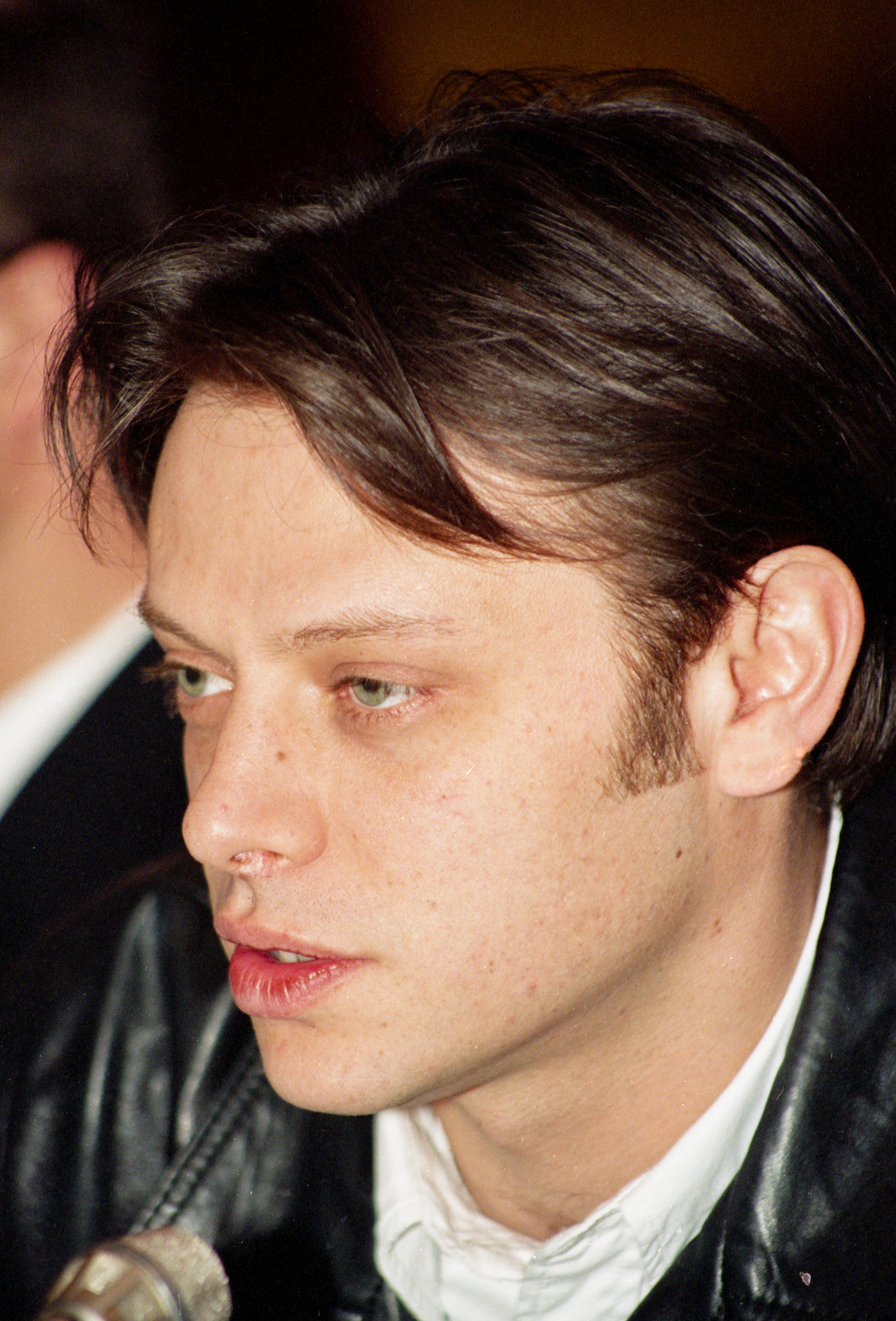
- Todorovsky in 1998
- Born: Valery Petrovich Todorovsky; 8 May 1962 (age 64); Odesa, Ukrainian SSR, Soviet Union (now Ukraine)
- Citizenship: Soviet Union (1962–1991); Russia (1991–present)
- Education: Gerasimov Institute of Cinematography
- Occupations: Film director, screenwriter, TV producer
- Years active: 1996 — present
- Spouse: Evgeniya Brik (m. 2006; died 2022)
- Father: Pyotr Todorovsky

Valery Petrovich Todorovsky (Russian: Вале́рий Петро́вич Тодоро́вский, Ukrainian: Валерій Петрович Тодоровський; born 9 May 1962) is a celebrated Russian film director, screenwriter, TV producer. A member of a prominent dynasty of filmmakers, he is the son of Pyotr Todorovsky and the father of Pyotr Todorovsky Jr.

== Biography ==
=== Early years and family ===
Valery Todorovsky was born in Odesa on 8 May 1962, to a prominent Soviet film director Pyotr Todorovsky and his wife Mira, née German. As recalled by Todorovsky, he practically grew up on set as he always followed his father at work. He played his first role in cinema when he was still a schoolboy. When he was 10, the family moved to Moscow.

Following in his father's footsteps, Todorovsky sought to enter the directing department of the Gerasimov Institute of Cinematography, but failed twice. On his third attempt, he enrolled in the scriptwriting course and graduated in 1984. He emerged as a screenwriter with the movie The Double, co-written with Andris Kolbergs.

=== Cinema ===
His directorial debut, The Hearse (Katafalk), won the Grand Prix at Mannheim (1990). Released in 1991, Todorovsky's sophomore feature Love became a break-through and brought him the Ecumenical Prize at Cannes (1992), as well as awards at Sozvezdie, Chicago, Geneva, San Sebastian and Montpellier Film Festivals.

His 1994 noir drama Katya Ismailova, starring Ingeborga Dapkūnaitė, is a modern adaptation of Nikolai Leskov's 1865 novella Lady Macbeth of the Mtsensk District. The movie was well received by critics and audience and won 5 Nika Awards, including Best Director.

One of Todorovsky's most known works is a 1998 drama The Country of Deaf, written by actress and director Renata Litvinova and based on her own novella To Have and to Belong, became a big success and reached cult status. The film was selected for the 48th Berlin International Film Festival in 1998, it won several Nikas (for Best Female Actor (Dina Korzun) and Best Sound Design (Gleb Kravetsky).) and Best Films Award at the 1998 Russian Guild of Film Critics Awards. An intense drama, it portrayed the world devoid of love, where love was substituted with erotic obsession or becomes a prey to financial interests.

In 1999 Todorovsky was a member of the jury at the 21st Moscow International Film Festival.

His 2008 musical film Hipsters became widely popular in Russia, grossed $16 mln and won the Golden Eagle Award and Nika Award for Best Film. Though it couldn’t target foreign audiences on the same level as Russian, the movie was released internationally, screened at several festivals and collected a series of awards, including the Black Pearl narrative film award in 2009 at the Abu Dhabi Film Festival.

After the success of the Hipsters, Todorovsky returned to the 1960s in Russia with two TV series, The Thaw and the Optimists, both well received by the audience and critically acclaimed.

=== TV and producing ===
Since the 1990s, Todorovsky has also been active as a producer, his credits include dozens of TV series and feature films.

Among others, he co-produced the Russian gangster TV series Brigada (2002) and the 2005 TV adaptation of the Master and Margarita for Telekanal Rossiya, detective series Vorona in 2018 for NTV channel. In 2013, Todorovsky debuted as TV series director with The Thaw, a melodrama about life in the Soviet Union during the early years of Nikita Khrushchev's era.

Since 2018, he has been the director of ‘Pilot’ youth film festival.

In 2022, his drama In Two premiered on a Russian streaming service More.tv, it starred Alexander Petrov, Danila Kozlovsky, and Irina Starshenbaum.

== Personal life ==
Todorovsky was married for 20 years to Natalya Tokareva, the couple had a daughter Ekaterina and a son, Pyotr Jr. His son from the first marriage, Pyotr Todorovsky Jr., emerged as a successful film director.

Valery Todorovsky was married by second marriage to actress Evgeniya Brik, with whom he had a daughter Zoya, born in 2009 in Los Angeles. The couple lived in the USA and occasionally returned to Russia for work. Brik died from cancer in 2022.

== Selected filmography ==
=== Director ===
- 1990 – Katafalk
- 1991 – Love
- 1994 – Katya Ismailova
- 1998 – The Country of Deaf
- 2002 – The Lover
- 2004 – My Step Brother Frankenstein
- 2007 – Vice
- 2008 – Hipsters
- 2013 – The Thaw TV series
- 2017 – Bolshoi
- 2019 – Odesa
- 2020 – Hypnosis
- 2022 – In Two TV series

=== Screenwriter ===
- 1991 – Cynics
- 1992 – Over the Dark Water
- 2013 – The Geographer Drank His Globe Away

=== Producer ===
- 1999-2000 – Kamenskaya (TV series)
- 2003 – The Idiot
- 2006 – Piranha
- 2006 – Kiss of a Butterfly
- 2006 – Filipp's Bay
- 2008 – S. S. D.
- 2009 – Oxygen
- 2014 – Chagall — Malevich
- 2014 – Iron Ivan
- 2021 – The Danube
- 2023 - Actresses

== Literature ==
- Taylor, Richard (2000). The BFI Companion to Eastern European and Russian Cinema. British Film Institute. p. 242. ISBN 978-1-83871-849-7.
- Bueno Alonso, Jorge L. (2024). Teaching Shakespeare in Film and the Arts Today: Models, Methods, Materials. Cambridge Scholars Publishing. ISBN 978-1-0364-1480-1.
- Lawton, Anna M. (2004). Imaging Russia 2000: Film and Facts. New Academia Publishing. p. 148. ISBN 0-9744934-2-2.
