= Ingeborga Dapkūnaitė =

Lithuanian actress

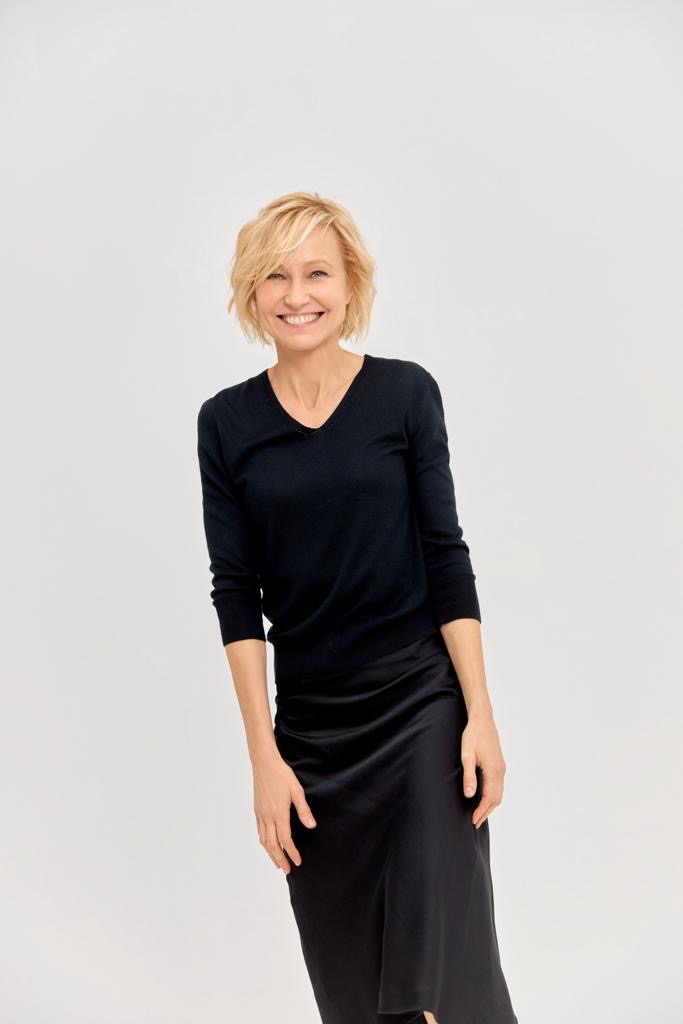
- Ingeborga Dapkūnaitė, 2024
- Born: 20 January 1963 (age 63); Vilnius, Lithuanian SSR, Soviet Union
- Citizenship: Lithuania; United Kingdom
- Education: Lithuanian State Conservatory
- Occupations: Actress; television presenter
- Years active: 1983–present
- Height: 166 cm (65 in)
- Spouses: Arūnas Sakalauskas (divorced); Simon Stokes (m. 1993; div. 2009); Dmitry Yampolsky (m. 2013; div. 2018)
- Children: 1
- Father: Petras Edmundas Dapkūnas
- Awards: Golden Aries Award (1992); Nika Award (1995)

Ingeborga Dapkūnaitė (born 20 January 1963) is а Lithuanian actress and television presenter. Known for her screen and stage performances, she has gained recognition for films such as Burnt by the Sun (1994) and Katya Ismailova (1994), which won her the Nika Award for Best Actress. Dapkūnaitė was also credited in Mission: Impossible (1996), Seven Years in Tibet (1997), Kiss of Life (2003), and Okkupert (2015–2019).

Dapkūnaitė has performed in theaters in Lithuania, the United Kingdom, United States, and Russia, including Steppenwolf Theatre, Shaftesbury Theatre, The Old Vic, Hampstead Theatre, Theatre of Nations, and more. She has a long-lasting professional partnership with John Malkovich - they have worked together on numerous theatre productions.

== Early life ==
Ingeborga Dapkūnaitė was born in Vilnius, then in the Lithuanian SSR of the Soviet Union, on 20 January 1963. Her father, Petras Edmundas Dapkūnas, was a diplomat, while her mother, Ingeborga Dapkūnienė (Sabalytė), was a meteorologist. Because of work, her parents spent most of their time away from their hometown, in particular in Moscow, while Ingeborga remained in Vilnius. She was cared for by her grandmother Genovaitė Sabliene, the manager of the Lithuanian National Opera and Ballet Theatre, and her aunt and uncle, who held positions at the symphony orchestra.

Dapkūnaitė made her theatrical debut at the age of four as Dolore in the Puccini opera Madama Butterfly. Later, she also played in Faust, The Demon, and The Queen of Spades. Dapkūnaitė attended theatrical school at the local House of Unions and practiced sports, such as figure skating and basketball (quite popular in Lithuania by that time). After school, she enrolled in the Department of Theater Arts of the Lithuanian State Conservatory and studied under Jonas Vaitkus.

== Career ==
=== Stage ===
After the Conservatory, Dapkūnaitė joined Kaunas State Drama Theatre. In two years, she had played seven leading roles in the productions by her master, Jonas Vaitkus. She portrayed Antigone in the production of Sophocles' play, played Shelly in the Buried Child, and several Shakespearean roles. Later, she was invited to the Lithuanian National Drama Theatre. She also worked in the Vilnius State Theatre under Eimuntas Nekrošius and performed in The Seagull and The Nose.

In 1992, she performed together with John Malkovich in the production of Slip of the Tongue at Steppenwolf Theatre (Chicago) and then at Shaftesbury Theatre (London), directed by Simon Stokes. This role resulted in many years of friendship and collaboration with Malkovich, while Stokes soon became Dapkūnaitė's (second) husband. Dapkunaite played in Malkovich's Steppenwolf production Libra, acted alongside him in The Giacomo Variations in Ronacher (Vienna) and Sydney Opera, and in Timofei Kulyabin's production of In the Solitude of Cotton Fields in Dailes Theatre (Riga).

Dapkūnaitė also worked in other theaters in the UK, U.S.,, and Europe. In London, she appeared in Cloaca, directed by Kevin Spacey, at The Old Vic, in Moonlight, and in After Darwin at the Hampstead Theatre, and in The Vagina Monologues at Ambassadors Theatre. In Moscow, she played Vera Pavlova. Poems in the Practice Theatre. She also performed in the Theatre of Nations and had leading roles in Zhanna, The Idiot, Circus, and Ivan Vyrypaev's Iranian Conference. She also had a lead play in Touchables (Russian: Прикасаемые), the first-ever theatrical production with deaf-blind actors.

=== Screen ===
==== Lithuania ====
Dapkūnaitė debuted on screen in 1984 (as a fourth-grade student) as Aukse in Raimundas Banionis's first feature film Mano mazyte žmona (English: My Little Wife. In 1986, she performed together with Igor Kostolevsky in Isaak Fridbergas's Nakties paklydeliai (English: Night Whispers). The same year, she played in Chameleono zaidimai (English: Chameleon Game, written and directed by Arūnas Žebriūnas. In 1987, she starred in the television film Elektroninė senelė (English: Electronic Grandmother) based on Ray Bradbury's short story I Sing the Body Electric. and acted in the war drama Savaitgalis pragare (English: Weekend in Hell).

==== Russia ====
Dapkūnaitė became widely popular in the Soviet Union after the role of the young prostitute Kisulya in Pyotr Todorovsky's 1989 drama Intergirl. In 1991, she starred in Dmitry Meskhiev's Cynics, in which she received the 1992 Golden Aries Actress of the Year award. In 1994, the leading role in Valery Todorovsky's 1994 drama film Katya Ismailova won Dapkūnaitė the Nika Award for Best Actress. The same year, Dapkūnaitė portrayed Marussia in Nikita Mikhalkov's Burnt by the Sun, which received the Academy Award for Best Foreign Language Film and the Grand Prix at the 1994 Cannes Film Festival.

Her other roles in the Soviet and Russian movies included Vija Beinerte's Stecheniye obstoyatel'stv (1988), Igor Talankin's Osen, Chertanovo... (1989), Alexei Balabanov's Morphine (film) (2008), Aleksandr Melnik's Terra Nova (2008), Jamie Bradshaw's and Alexander Dulerayn's Branded. Her leading roles included Orange Juice by Andrey Proshkin and Winter Will not Come by Ilia Demichev. On TV, she appeared as Morpheya in the Sky Court (2011), Mrs Hudson in the adaptation of Sherlock Holmes (2012), Alexandra Feodorovna in the Grigoriy R mini-series (2014), and Maria Feodorovna in Alexei Uchitel's 2017 Matilda.

On TV, Dapkūnaitė was the co-host of the Russian edition of the Big Brother reality show (2005) and the spokesperson at the Eurovision Song Contest 2009 finals in Moscow. She also took part in the Stars on Ice (2006) and The new songs about the most important things (2007) TV shows. She also performed in the music video for the Bi-2 alternative rock track My Rock 'n Roll.

==== Other countries ====
In the 1990s, the success of the Burnt by the Sun sparked interest in Dapkūnaitė among filmmakers in the West. She was invited to play the role of IMF (Impossible Missions Force) agent Hannah Williams in Brian De Palma’s Mission: Impossible and portrayed the wife of Heinrich Harrer (played by Brad Pitt) in Jean-Jacques Annaud’s Seven Years in Tibet (1997). In 2003, Dapkūnaitė portrayed Helen in Emily Young's debut feature film Kiss of Life , and in 2007, she played the mother of Hannibal Lecter in Hannibal Rising, directed by Peter Webber. She also acted together with Emir Kusturica in the espionage thriller L'affaire Farewell (2009) by Christian Carion and played in Alexis Lloyd's romantic comedy 30 Beats (2012).

Dapkūnaitė's roles on TV included Alexandra Feodorovna in the TV mini-series The Lost Prince (2003); Jasmina Blekic in Series 6 of Prime Suspect (2003); nurse Katya Bredova in Season 1 of the medical drama series Bodies (2004); and Baiba Liepa in Wallander, episodes "The Dogs of Riga" and "A Lesson in Love".

Dapkūnaite played top Russian diplomat Irina Sidorova, one of the key roles in the Norwegian series Okkupert (English: Occupied), first aired in 2015. In the 2018 Russian-Estonian remake of the 2011 Swedish/Danish crime drama The Bridge she played the lead role of Estonian detective Inga Veerma.

== Awards ==
- The Honored Artist of the Lithuanian SSR title (was the last person to receive that honor)
- The 1992 Golden Aries Actress of the Year (Cynics)
- The 1995 Nika Award for Best Actress (Katya Ismailova)
- The 2014 Oleg Yankovsky Creative Discovery award (Zhanna, Theatre of Nations)

== Other roles ==
Dapkūnaitė served on the jury of the 23rd Moscow International Film Festival (2001), the 56th Cannes Film Festival Cinéfondation program (2003), the 55th Berlin International Film Festival (2005), the 20th Mar del Plata International Film Festival (2005), the 33rd Cairo International Film Festival (2009), and the 67th Venice Film Festival (2010).

Dapkūnaitė was the Longines Ambassador of Elegance (since 2005) and L'Oréal Ambassador of Beauty (since 2014).

Dapkūnaitė was the head of the Cinemotion acting school, and curated the acting department of the Moscow Film School.

== Personal life ==
Dapkūnaitė first married a fellow Lithuanian State Conservatory student, a Lithuanian actor, Arūnas Sakalauskas. Her second husband was British artistic director Simon Stokes, with whom she worked on A Slip of the Tongue.

From 2013 to 2018, Dapkūnaitė was married to Russian lawyer, entrepreneur, and philanthropist Dmitry Yampolsky. They have a son.

At different points of her life she lived in Lithuania, the United Kingdom, Russia, and Belgium. In February 2022, she denounced the Russian invasion of Ukraine and left Russia.

She holds Lithuanian and British citizenship.

== Philanthropy ==
For years, Dapkūnaitė had been the chairperson of the board of trustees of the Hospice Charity Foundation Vera and a member of the board of trustees of the Friends Foundation. Since 2015, she had produced a Touchables (Russian: Прикасаемые) theatrical project in the Theatre of Nations, which aims to integrate deafblind people into the acting community.

== Filmography ==
Year	Title	Role	Notes
1984	My Little Wife	Aukse	
1985	Zodiac		TV
1985	Night Whispers	Inga	
1986	Game chameleon	Veronica	
1987	The mysterious heir	Asya Tikhonova	
1987	The confluence of circumstances	Veronica Bergs	
1987	The 13th Apostle	Mariya	
1988	Autumn, Chertanovo ...	Mariya Zavarzina	
1988	Crossing	Kama-Basia Zalevskaya	
1989	Intergirl	Kisulya	
1989	F minor	Katya	
1990	Nikolai Vavilov	Natalia Karlovna Lemke	Mini-series
1991	Cynics	Olga	
1992–1993	The Good Guys	Sanda	TV series
1993	Fatal Deception: Mrs. Lee Harvey Oswald	Lubya	TV
1993	The Alaska Kid	Salli	TV series
1994	Katya Ismailova (russian title: Near Moscow Nights)	Katya Ismailova	
1994	Burnt by the Sun	Maroussia	
1995	Thief Takers		TV series
1996	On Dangerous Ground	Asta	TV
1996	Mission: Impossible	Hannah Williams	
1996	Letters from the East	Marie / Mother	
1997	Seven Years in Tibet	Ingrid Harrer	
1998	CI5: The New Professionals	Elkie	TV series
1999–2001	Big Bad World	Natalia	TV series
1999	Sunburn	Carolyn Kramer	
2000	Moscow	Masha	
2000	Rostov-dad	Elya	TV series
2000	Shadow of the Vampire	Micheline	
2002	War	Margaret	
2002	Stereoblood	Mariya	
2003	The Lost Prince	Tsaritsa Alexandra Feodorovna	TV
2003	The Suit	Asya	
2003	Kiss of Life	Helen	
2003	Coming Up	Olesya Muratseva	TV series
2003	Prime Suspect S6: The Last Witness	Jasmina Blekic	Mini-series
2004	25 Degrees in Winter	Sonia	
2004–2006	Bodies	Katya Bredova	TV series
2005	Graveyard Shift	wife of the owner	
2006	Silent Witness	Dr. Caroline Anscombe	TV series
2007	Hannibal Rising	Mother Lecter	
2007	In Transit	Vera	
2008	Morphine	Anna	
2008	Terra Nova	Marta	
2009	L'affaire Farewell	Natasha	
2009	Jolly Fellows	Margo	
2009	Volunteer	Lena	Mini-series
2009	Katya: Military history	Mariya Barsukova	TV series
2010	Orange Juice	Dasha	
2010	Cadenzas	Liza	
2011	Heavenly Court	Morpheus	Mini-series
2012	30 Beats	The Call-Girl - Alice	
2012	Branded	Guru's Associate Dubcek	
2012	Wallander – s.3.02, "The Dogs of Riga"	Baiba Liepa	TV series
2012	Heavenly Court	Morpheus	Film
2013	Antalya		
2013	Sherlock Holmes	Mrs. Hudson	TV series
2014	Express "Moscow-Russia"	conductor Anna	
2014	Gregory R.	Empress Alexandra Feodorovna	TV series
2014	Heavenly Court. Continued	Morpheus	Mini-series
2015–2019	Occupied	Irina Sidorova	TV series
2015	Men's Life in Autumn		
2016	Wallander – "A Lesson in Love"	Baiba Liepa	TV series
2016	Artist Kills Self	Clarissa Stearn	
2017	Jeanne	Jeanne	
2017	Matilda	Maria Feodorovna (Dagmar of Denmark)	
2018–2020	The Bridge	Inga Veermaa, Estonian detective	TV series
2019	Union of Salvation	Princess Belskaya	
2019	Dark like the Night. Karenina-2019	journalist	short film
2022	Generation of Evil	Rasa Kymantaite, the mayor	
2025	Heads of State	Belarussian Farmer	
