= Sky Court =

- Genre: Supernatural, legal drama
- Written by: Alena Zvantsova
- Directed by: Alena Zvantsova
- Starring: Konstantin Khabensky; Mikhail Porechenkov
- Composer: Ilya Shpilov
- Country of origin: Russia
- Original language: Russian
- No. of series: 2
- No. of episodes: 8

Production
- Producers: Ruben Dishdishyan; Svetlana Slityuk; Aleksei Moiseev
- Cinematography: Sergei Machilskiy
- Production companies: DT Production; Central Partnership

Original release
- Network: STB

Sky Court (Russian: Небесный суд, romanized: Nebesniy sud) is a Russian supernatural legal drama television miniseries written and directed by Alena Zvantsova. The premiere took place in 2011 (four episodes) and four more episodes were aired in 2014. On the basis of the series, a full-length film was created.

== Plot ==
After death, each person appears before the court which sends the soul either to the "sector of repose" or the "sector of meditations". The last act of man is weighed on the scales of justice in which his entire previous life is reflected. But to give a correct assessment of this act is sometimes very difficult. For this, there is the heavenly court where they are judged by people who died a little earlier and have been sentenced to this work, which in essence is also a "sector of meditations" ...

== Cast ==
- Konstantin Khabensky – Andrei, prosecutor of the first stage
- Mikhail Porechenkov – Veniamin, second stage lawyer
- Daniela Stojanovic – Veronica Mitrovic, widow of Andrei
- Nikita Zverev – Nikita Mikhailovich Lazarev, the new satellite of Veronica
- Ingeborga Dapkūnaitė – employee of the Morpheus Dream Department
- Igor Gordin – Alex, Senior Inquisitor / Dylan Jay Bailey
- Dmitry Maryanov – the body for returning to the world of the living
- Anna Mikhalkova – Lucia Arkadievna, dentist
- Oleg Mazurov – Antonio Luigi Amore
- Arthur Waha – Sergio Amore
- Sergei Barkovsky – Savva Mefodyevich, the defendant
- Yevgenia Dobrovolskaya – Anna Vladimirovna, witness
- Igor Gasparian – body used for returning to the world of the living
- Yuri Itskov – August Karlovich, the keeper of bodies
- Yuri Orlov – judge
- Jana Sexte – Lilith
- Vitaly Kovalenko – Denis Rybakov
- Era Ziganshina – body, woman in the cemetery
- Sergei Bysgu – Presbyter Pretorius, defendant
- Igor Chernevich – Herman Borisovich Kashin (bore), the defendant
- Ksenia Katalymova – bartender Tatiana
