= Walther Vanden Ende =

Belgian cinematographer (born 1947)

- Born: 29 June 1947 (age 78); Bruges, Flanders, Belgium
- Occupation: Cinematographer
- Years active: 1975-present

Walther Vanden Ende (born 29 June 1947) is a Belgian cinematographer. He contributed to more than sixty films since 1975 including No Man's Land, Joyeux Noël and The Eighth Day.

== Selected filmography ==
- I, Tintin (1975)
- Whitey (1980)
- Le Lit (1982)
- Winter 1960 (1983)
- Dust (1985)
- Wedding in Galilee (1987)
- The Cruel Embrace (1987)
- The Music Teacher (1988)
- Le Radeau de la Méduse (1990)
- Toto the Hero (1991)
- Daens (1992)
- Going Home (1993)
- The Violin Player (1994)
- Taxandria (1994)
- Farinelli (1994)
- The Eighth Day (1996)
- Felice...Felice... (1998)
- Left Luggage (1998)
- A Dog of Flanders (1999)
- Lisa (2001)
- No Man's Land (2001)
- Miss Minoes (2001)
- Sea of Silence (2003)
- 25 Degrees in Winter (2004)
- Joyeux Noël (2005)
- Sounds of Sand (2006)
- The Rainbowmaker (2008)
- Farewell (2009)
- Cirkus Columbia (2010)
- Sonny Boy (2011)
- The Zigzag Kid (2012)
