= Tula Academic Theatre =

Russian Theatre Building

Tula Academic Theatre Тульский академический театр драмы
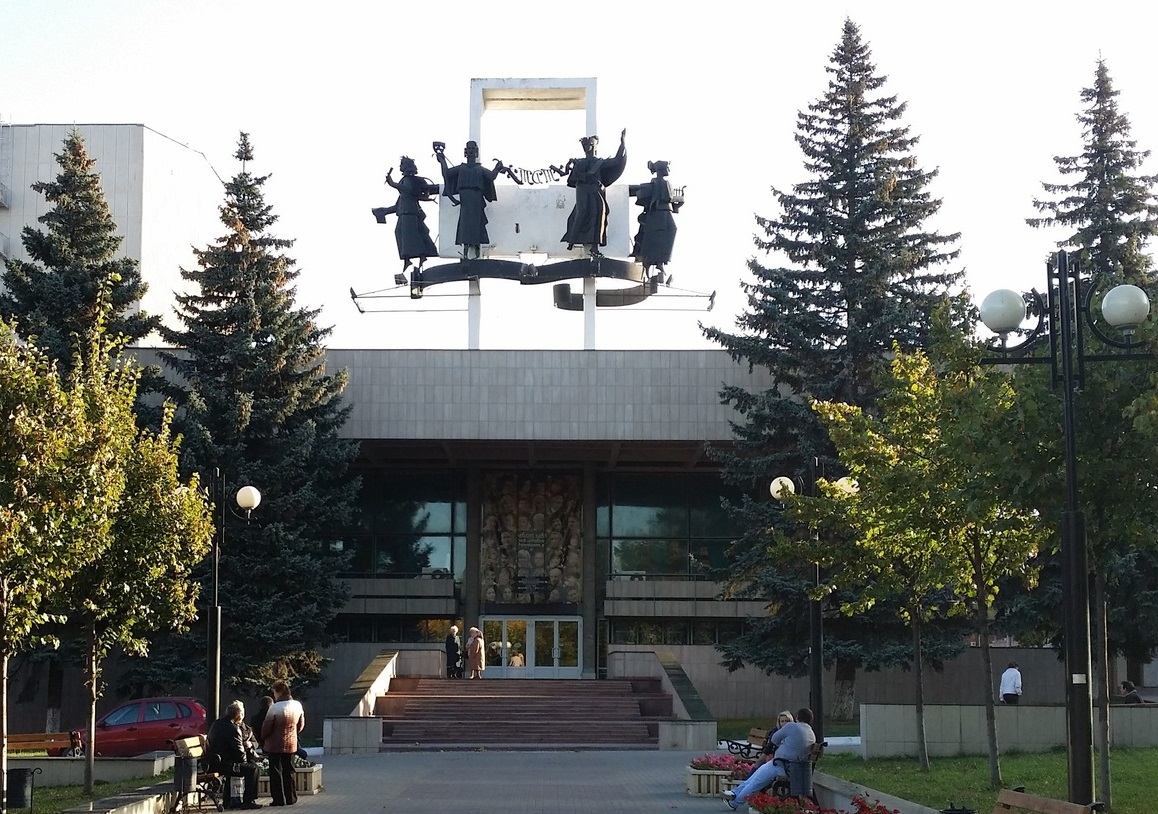
- Interactive map of Tula Academic Theatre; Тульский академический театр драмы
- Address: Tula, Lenin prospeky 34-a Tula; Russia
- Owner: State theatre
- Type: Drama theatre

Tula Academic Theatre (Тульский академический театр драмы) is a theatre in Tula, Russia, principally associated with the production of plays. Established in 1777 and operating on its present site since 1970. Tula Academic Theatre positions itself as a traditional drama theatre that produces classical heritage plays.

In 1989 Alexandr Popov became the director, his rule lasting for more than twenty years, up until his death in 2011.The theatre's brightest stars included Sofia Sotnichevskaya, Boris Zavolokin, Olga Krasikova, Vitaly Bazin, Evgenia Pchelkina and Natalia Savchenko.
