= 25 Degrees in Winter =

- Directed by: Stéphane Vuillet
- Written by: Stéphane Malandrin; Pedro Romero; Stéphane Vuillet
- Starring: Carmen Maura; Jacques Gamblin; Ingeborga Dapkūnaitė
- Cinematography: Walther Vanden Ende
- Release date: February 14, 2004 (Berlin)
- Running time: 92 min
- Countries: Belgium, France, Russia, Spain
- Languages: French, Dutch, Russian, Spanish

25 Degrees in Winter is a 2004 international comedy-drama film directed by Stéphane Vuillet.

== Cast ==
- Carmen Maura - Abuelita
- Jacques Gamblin - Miguel
- Ingeborga Dapkūnaitė - Sonia
- Raphaëlle Molinier - Laura
- Pedro Romero - Juan
- Lubna Azabal - Loubna
- Valérie Lemaître - Estelle
- Aleksandr Medvedev - Evgenij
