= Vladimir Presnyakov Jr. =

Russian singer (born 1968)

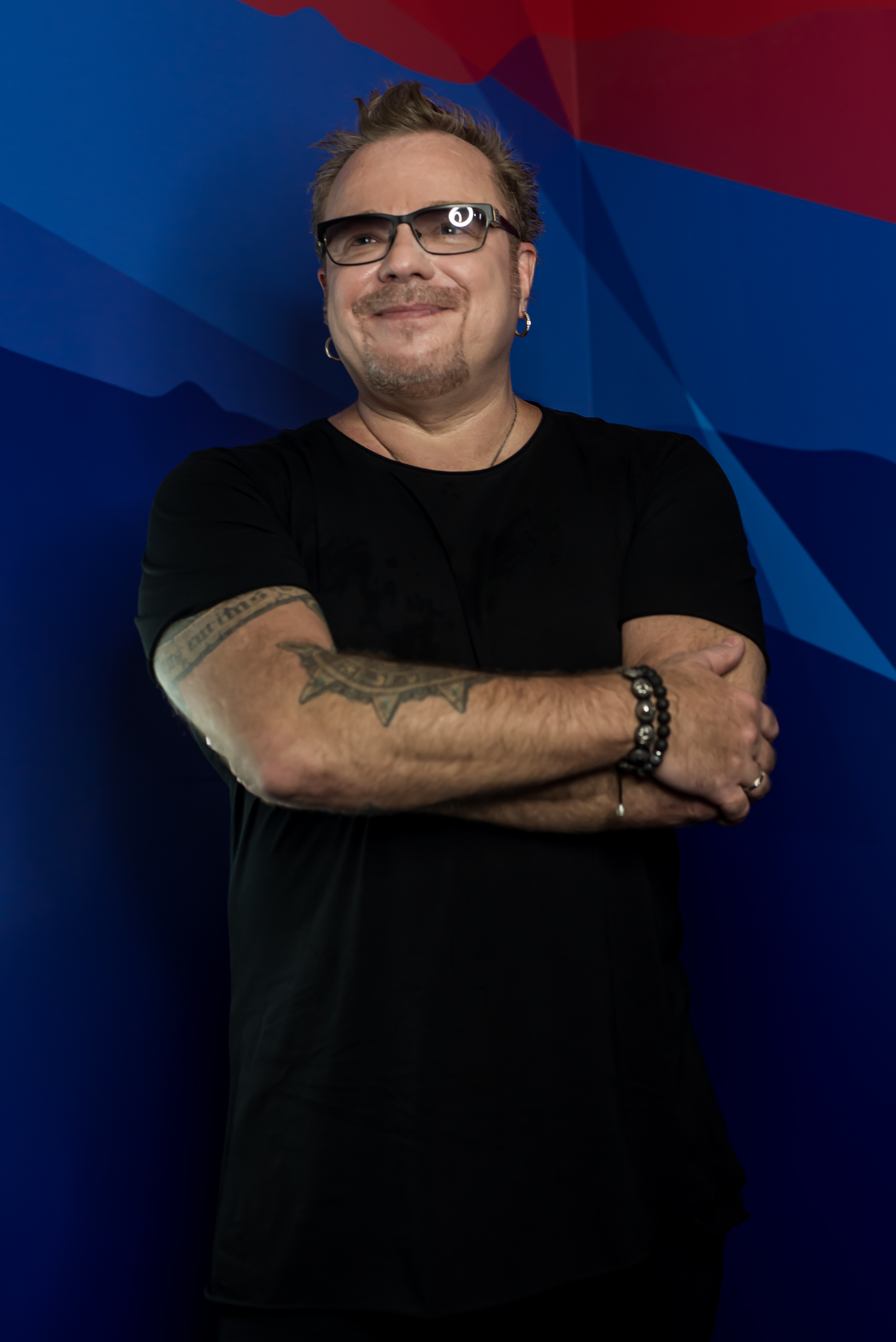
- Presnyakov in 2021

Background information
- Born: Vladimir Vladimirovich Presnyakov; 29 March 1968 (age 58); Sverdlovsk, Russian SSR, Soviet Union
- Genres: Pop; pop-rock; blue-eyed soul; reggae; reggae fusion; funk
- Occupations: Singer-songwriter; arranger; keyboardist; composer; actor
- Instruments: Vocals; keyboards
- Years active: 1986–present
- Website: vpresnyakov.ru

Vladimir Vladimirovich Presnyakov (Russian: Владимир Владимирович Пресняков; born 29 March 1968) is a Soviet and Russian singer, musician, keyboardist, composer, arranger, and actor.

A winner of the Golden Gramophone Award, he worked in the theater songs of Alla Pugacheva from 1987 to 1994.

== Biography ==
=== Early life ===
Presnyakov was born in Sverdlovsk (now Yekaterinburg) on 29 March 1968 in the family of musicians Vladimir Petrovich and Elena Petrovna Presnyakov, future soloists of the VIA Samotsvety.

In 1979, he composed his first song, from 1980, he sang in the choir of the Yelokhovo Cathedral in Moscow, at 1981, he performed with the group Cruise, performing his own songs "The Old Tale", "Red Book", "The Cat". His solo career began when he was 15 years old, at Laima Vaikule's restaurant variety show. He studied at the Choral College named after Sveshnikov, but was expelled from the college for objectionable behavior in 1982. Later he studied at the conductor-choir department of the School named after the October Revolution. In 1983, he had a case of pneumonia and lost his voice. When he recovered, his voice became a falsetto.

=== Career ===
Presnyakov performed songs in many movies. The musical film Higher Than Rainbow (1986) brought Presnyakov popularity — he sang the songs of the protagonist and had an episodic role in the picture. The songs "Zurbagan" and "The Roadside Grass is Sleeping" became hits. He also acted in the film She with a Broom, He in a Black Hat (1987) and performed several songs in the picture Island of Lost Ships (1989).

In 1989, Presnyakov's debut album, "Dad, You Were Like That" was released, which formed the image of the singer. In the same year, Vladimir Presnyakov took part in the first Russian rock musical "Street". In the annual TASS hit list of that year, he took 4th place in the solo performer category, with 12 995 votes. His song "Touch-Me-Not" in the same hit parade took 17th place (2257 votes).

With the solo concert program "The Vladimir Presnyakov Show" the musician successfully performed in the biggest concert halls of Moscow and Leningrad – Olympic Stadium and Yubileyny Sports Palace. Presnyakov became the first Russian artist to receive the "Golden Key" prize in Monte Carlo (Monaco) as an artist whose recordings were sold in Russia in the largest circulation. In the early 1990s, the artist formed the "Captain" and with a new program "Farewell to Childhood" successfully performed in Moscow, as well as in the cities of near and far abroad.

In 1991, Presnyakov released a double album "Love". In 1994, the album "Castle from the Rain" was released, which was a huge success: the songs "Stewardess by the name of Jeanne", "Girlfriend Masha" were hits. In 1995, at the studio "Union" three collections of Presnyakov's best songs came out at once: "Zurbagan", "Wanderer" and "Jeanne". The new concert program "Castle from the Rain" was introduced in 1995 and was awarded the "Zvezda" award in the nomination "Show of the Year at Concert Venues of Russia". In 1996, Presnyakov's album "Saliva" was released, in 1998 the disk "Live Collection" appeared, in 2001, the album "The Open Door".

In 2002, Presnyakov took part in the Channel One reality show Last Hero and became its winner. In the same year, the new album "Love on AUDIO" was released. In 2005, the singer recorded a joint disc with the band Malyrija. In 2006, Vladimir Presnyakov, along with Leonid Agutin, released the song "Airports", which became a radio hit, and Presnyakov and Agutin received the Golden Gramophone Award for Best Male Duo and were nominated for the 2007 Muz-TV Award as the "Best Duet". In 2012, the album "Be a part of yours" was released, which the musician recorded together with Leonid Agutin, Angelika Varum and Natalia Podolskaya. In early 2013, Vladimir Presnyakov prepared a new concert program "A Bad Angel", which included both new and already well-known songs.

=== Personal life ===
He was divorced twice. He married Kristina Orbakaite and in 1991 they had a child Nikita. They separated in 1996. In 2001 Vladimir married fashion designer Yelena Lenskaya. In 2005 they were divorced. Since 2005 he has been living with singer Natalia Podolskaya, they married in 2010 and in June 2015 Natalia gave birth to baby boy Artemy. Their second son, Ivan, was born in October 2020.

== Discography ==
=== EP ===
- 1989 — You Say (Melodiya)

=== Albums ===
- 1989 — Dad, You Were Like That (Melodiya)
- 1991 — Love (Alt Records)
- 1993 — Best Of Hits, compilation
- 1994 — The Castle of the Rain (General Records)
- 1996 — Zurbagan (Soyuz)
- 1996 — The Wanderer (Soyuz)
- 1996 — Zhanna (Soyuz)
- 1996 — Saliva (Soyuz)
- 2001 — The Open Door, Rain (Monolith)
- 2002 — Love on Audio
- 2009 — Malaria
- 2011 — Unreal Love
- 2012 — To be a Part of Yours (with Leonid Agutin, Anzhelika Varum and Natalia Podolskaya)
- 2020 — Listening to the Silence (Velvet Music)

=== DVD ===
- 2001 — Live Collection, concert, Moroz Records
- 2005 — Love on VIDEO, clips. BS Graphics
- 2005 — Back to the Future, concert. ICA Music

Awards
World Music Awards
Preceded by	Best-Selling Soviet Artist; 1989; Vladimir Presnyakov	Succeeded by 1991 Valery Leontiev
