= Ekaterina Fedulova =

Russian actress

- Born: Ekaterina Olegovna Fedulova; 5 November 1979; Lyubertsy
- Occupation: Actress
- Years active: 1998–present
- Spouse: Petr Dukhovskoy
- Children: 1

Ekaterina Olegovna Fedulova (Russian: Екатерина Олеговна Федулова) is a Russian actress. Winner of the MTV Russia Movie Awards 2007 (Best Actress for Piter FM).

== Biography ==
Ekaterina was born on November 5, 1979. She studied at the acting department of the International Slavic Institute in Moscow.

== Selected filmography ==
Year	Title	Role	Notes
2006	Piter FM	Masha	
2007	Temptation	Zhenya	
2009	Laskovyi Mai	Lilya	
