= Mindaugas Karbauskis =

Lithuanian theater director

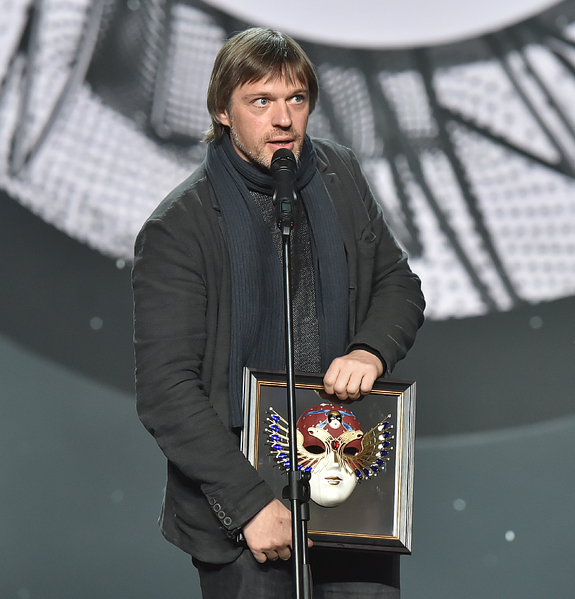

Mindaugas Karbauskis (born 28 January 1972) is a Lithuanian theater director, since 2011 artistic director of Mayakovsky Theatre. Winner of the Golden Mask Award (2007, 2008, 2016). He resigned from the position of the artistic director on February 25, 2022.

== Biography ==
Mindaugas Karbauskis was born on 28 January 1972 in Naisiai (Šiauliai District Municipality). His parents Cheslovas Karbauskis and Nijole Karbauskene. His elder brother Ramunas is a well-known politician and philanthropist in Lithuania.

He graduated from the theater department of the Lithuanian Academy of Music and Theatre. In 2001 he graduated from the directing department of GITIS (workshop of Pyotr Fomenko).
