= Kharkiv School of Photography =

Underground artistic movement in Soviet Ukraine

The Kharkiv School of Photography (KSOP) (Ukrainian: Харківська Школа Фотографії) is a Ukrainian artistic photography movement. It was created in opposition to the Soviet socialist realism art style, which reigned from 1934 until the 1980s. KSOP started to form in the 1960s when artistic photography revived in Kharkiv during the period of the Khrushchev Thaw. KSOP's official formation as a non-conformist underground movement was denoted by the establishment of a group by Kharkiv photographers named the Vremia Group 1971; its foundation is considered the sign of the revival of modernist art in Kharkiv.

The Vremia Group built upon avant-garde traditions and brought socialist realism dogmas into play. They are known for extreme experimentations with photography techniques and methods and are credited for inventing and developing a number of them. One of their signature aesthetic inventions is the "blow theory" (or "the theory of stroke"), which uses a shocking element to make a strong photographic statement. Another advance was the concept of "bad photography," which critics called the first example of conceptualism of Soviet photography. Some KSOP works are considered one-of-a-kind experiments in photography in the Soviet Union as well as the start of an aesthetic revolution in Ukrainian photography.

This first KSOP was represented by the Vremia Group founded in 1971 by Jury Rupin and Evgeniy Pavlov within the Kharkiv Regional Photo Club and later diverged from it. The group's other members were: Boris Mikhailov, Oleg Maliovany, Gennadiy Tubalev, Oleksandr Suprun, Oleksandr Sitnichenko, and Anatoliy Makiyenko. In 1975, the Vremia Group members joined the board of the Kharkiv Regional Photo Club and in 1975 or 1976, due to their radical artistic activity, the Photo Club was shut down. Nevertheless, the group continued unofficially, and the members kept in touch.

Later, the artists of the next generation joined the movement. The Gosprom Group (initially called Kontakty Group: Misha Pedan, Sergey Bratkov, Volodymyr Starko, Igor Manko, Guennadi Maslov, Leonid Pesin, Kostiantyn Melnyk, and Boris Redko) worked on documentary photography ("straightphotography," or candid photos). Other artists included Viktor Kochetov, Roman Pyatkovka, Sergiy Solonsky, Andriy Avdeyenko, Igor Chursin, Igor Karpenko, and others.

The latest generation of KSOP includes the Shilo Group (Sergiy Lebedynskyy, Vladyslav Krasnoshchok, and Vadym Trykoz, as well as Vasylysa Nezabarom and Yuliia Drozdek who later became members of the BOBA Group), Bella Logachyova, Igor Chekachkov, and Roman Minin.

For a long time, Kharkiv photography wasn't attributed to the city or Ukraine, and was known only as "different Soviet photography" in Western media, but today it is considered the strongest Ukrainian school of photography both during and after Soviet times. In 2018, the Museum of the Kharkiv School of Photography opened, including a publishing house. The museum, managed by Sergiy Lebedynskyy, collects and preserves works from all KSOP generations as well as other Ukrainian and international artists.

== History ==
=== Soviet art (1920s–1950s) ===
The Ukrainian avant-garde movement, and photographic activity in general, developed in the 1920s within the highly esteemed circle of photographers. However, in the 1930s, political and social events brought any experimentations in photography to a close. In 1934, socialist realism was accepted as the main artistic style in the Soviet Union. With the development of totalitarianism, older artistic traditions were disallowed, and photographers were forced to document fictitious Soviet reality. Portraying any reality other than perfection, and taking photos of certain places, events, and objects, was restricted. Forbidden subjects included nudity, smoking, drinking, and illness, among others. In general, Soviet photography served its ideology and "utopian concepts." Official photography was produced and distributed under supervision of the Communist party.

The expression "artistic photography" didn't exist in the way we know it now, and the phrase could only be seen on the windows of salons where passport or memorial photographs were made. At the time, photography was considered a hobby rather than an art; photographers who didn't follow the rules — or even just a person holding a camera — could be jailed.

From the 1940s on, Soviet artists were isolated from European and American art, and the only "decent" artwork Kharkiv photographers could see was presented at Moscow exhibitions. Ukrainian photography experienced a revival in the period of the Khrushchev Thaw (mid 1950s–mid1960s), when the details of Stalin's regime and propaganda slowly started to surface in Soviet society. Starting with this period, new sources of information showed people that the Soviet Union was not as perfect as was pictured, and strongly influenced further the development of society as a whole and of art in particular.

=== Artistic revival in Kharkiv (1950s–1960s) ===
In the 1960s, various cultural initiatives appeared. The Sixtiers Movement started fighting to establish new forms and expressions of reality in art, bringing back avant-garde traditions. The success and longevity of artistic movements depended completely on the alternative unions and artistic "clubs" of that time, so they appeared rapidly across the country. Unions were common for painters, musicians, and writers; photographers, on the other hand, had only official photography clubs to serve as "professional unions." New approved-by-government photo clubs developed rapidly in Kharkiv. These clubs were an integral part of professional and democratic movements developing in the city's culture, and made photographic art legitimate.

It was in Kharkiv that photographic art "broke bright." Boris Kosarev and Vasyl Yermylov, the well-known representatives of the Kharkiv avant-garde movement of the 1920s, sparked a "new wave" art that resulted in radical artistic actions. The two artists and their pedagogical activity in connection with the art studio of Olesiy Shcheglov also played a key role in connecting the avant-garde traditions of the 1920s to the younger artists of the 1960s, and in handing on avant-garde principles to new generations of Kharkiv artists, such as Vagrich Bakhchanyan and Volodymyr Grygorov.

In 1964, in Kharkiv Builders' Palace of Culture, Volodymyr Grygorov, a watercolorist and avant-garde artist, started an artistic studio of photography which was attended by some of the key members of KSOP's first generation. Inspired by the rapid formation of clubs the Kharkiv School of Photography was established, making Kharkiv the capital of revived Ukrainian photography.

The scope of influence of Soviet art on KSOP is debated. According to some, KSOP denied anything connected to the Soviet Union, sought artistic freedom, and worked as an underground group, despite strong restrictions in photography methods different from the standard, a number of places, items and subjects prohibited for photographing, and frequent government searches of private and public spaces. On the other hand, KSOP member Misha Pedan stated that even while creating aesthetics which had never existed in Soviet Union or anywhere else, KSOP members still used Soviet reality as their foundation.

=== The Vremia Group (1970s) ===
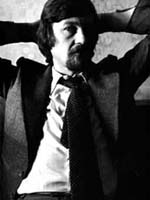
The co-founder of the Vremia Group, Jury Rupin

In 1965, the Regional Photo Club was opened and the Vremia Group formed within their non-conformist artistic movement inside the club, making it one of the most important art centers in Kharkiv.

The Vremia Group was founded by Jury Rupin and Evgeniy Pavlov in 1971, and showcased the start of the modernism revival in Kharkiv. The first members of the group were Oleg Maliovany, Boris Mikhailov, Gennadiy Tubalev, Oleksandr Suprun, and Oleksandr Sitnichenko; 18 months later, they were joined by Anatoliy Makiyenko. Painter Oleksandr Mishchan and writer Vasyl Mishchan, whose surrealistic books were an example of the unique Kharkiv "samizdat" technique, were both close to the Vremia Group.

The Vremia Group searched for new aesthetics. They experimented with themes and printing techniques, trying to fight the conservative, "gray" state of life in Soviet Union. Various old and new techniques were combined to make photos. According to Evgeniy Pavlov, at a time when photography and art were seen as separate things, the Vremia Group's main task was to "bridge the gap." In 1970s, Kharkiv photographers actively exchanged their photographic art with Lithuanian photographers, sharing each other's visual languages.

In 1975, the Vremia Group members joined the board of the Regional Photo Club. The government didn't like their avant-garde tendencies, labeled their activity "wrong," and eventually shut down the club in 1975 or 1976. Nevertheless, the group continued as a community of like-minded artists. According to one article, their fellowship lasted 10 years after the Photo Club closed. Another article stated that the Vremia Group stopped working as an art union in 1979. After the Vremia Group stopped its work as a union, the Kharkiv art space fell quiet until the mid-1980s.

=== Next generations (1980s–1990s) ===
With the decline of Soviet ideology in the 1970s and expanded freedom of expression in the late 1980s, Kharkiv photography started to appear more publicly and gain international recognition. However, despite its strong local specificity, Kharkiv photography success wasn't attributed to the city or to Ukraine, becoming known only as "different Soviet photography" in Western media.

During the 1980s, KSOP developed further and gained a new generation of members: Viktor Kochetov, Roman Pyatkovka, Sergiy Solonsky, Andriy Avdeyenko, and Leonid Konstantinov. They were joined by Igor Chursin, Igor Karpenko, and Oleksandr Papakitsa, who did not belong to any particular photography group and worked on staged studio photography.

Other KSOP photographers started to gather into new photo groups. The group called Kontakty (Misa Pedan, Volodymyr Starko, Igor Manko, Leonid Pesin, Boris Redko, and Guennadi Maslov) first gathered in the Builders Palace of Culture, where Maslov and later Starko worked. In 1986, the group hosted an exhibition there, and Starko was fired. Sergey Bratkov and Kostiantyn Melnyk joined the group sometime later. A group photo was taken in front of the historical Gosprom building in Kharkiv, and the name of the group changed from Kontakty to Gosprom. The new generation used the methods of their predecessors as well as creating their own.

By the beginning of the 1990s, almost every member of the group had experienced drastic life changes: a change in artistic style, a new profession, or even a move away from Kharkiv.

=== Post-Soviet photography (1990s–present day) ===
Despite the deplorable social and economic situation in Ukraine after the Soviet Union collapse, the artistic life developed through the private initiatives of the photographers. For example, the first venue for contemporary art in Kharkiv, the "Up/Down" gallery, was opened and existed under leadership of Sergey Bratkov, Boris Mikhailov, Sergiy Solonsky, Igor Manko, and Igor Chursin from 1993 to 1997. Another institution, which played a significant role in the cultural development of Kharkiv in the late 1990s – early 2000s, was the Palitra gallery, organized by Andriy Avdeyenko in 1996 and over the years hosting multiple influential art exhibitions.

After the Soviet Union collapsed, Ukrainian and Russian photography adopted Western practices. KSOP became known across the world represented by a number of Ukrainian artists who gained global recognition on the same level as many international professionals.

KSOP kept gaining new members, such as Bella Logachyova, Igor Chekachkov, Roman Minin. One of the best-known representatives for contemporary KSOP was the founding trio of the Shilo Group (founded in 2010): Sergiy Lebedynskyy, Vladyslav Krasnoshchok, and Vadym Trykoz. Its members also included Vasylysa Nezabarom and Yuliia Drozdek who later became members of the BOBA Group. One of their most well-known works is Finished Dissertation (2012), a remake of Boris Mikhailov's Unfinished Dissertation (1984–1985) and a singular tribute to the history of the Kharkiv School of Photography. The Shilo Group interviewed the circle of Kharkiv photographers, including Mikhailov, and used his book for their new project. The Shilo Group is known for its criticism towards social processes in post-Soviet countries. The group's photo projects have been successfully exhibited all over the world.

During the era of the Vremia Group, the "Kharkiv School of Photography" was considered a simple "figure of speech," but today it has become accepted as more than a Ukrainian photography "myth." Today, KSOP is considered "the strongest photographic school in Ukraine, both during and after Soviet times."

=== Museum of Kharkiv School of Photography ===
Part of the Museum of Kharkiv School of Photography (MOKSOP) was opened to the public in 2018. As of 2020, the museum's main building is still under construction, but it does have an official website and an archive of collections. Despite the name, the museum focuses not only on the preservation and presentation of KSOP work, but also on collecting photos of new generations of Kharkiv photographers and other Ukrainian and international artists. The museum founder and director is photographer Sergiy Lebedynskyy. Museum staff, including Oleksandra Osadcha and Nadiia Bernard-Kovalchuk, publish research on photography.

As the first generation of Kharkiv photographers reaches their elder years, museum staff works to capture their history and activity while it is still possible to gather their firsthand memories, experiences, and works. MOKSOP launched a project aimed at creating and publishing a collection of photo books by Ukrainian photographers. To achieve this, a publishing house was established within the museum. The project was called "one of the most intriguing events of 2018 in the entire Post-Soviet photography arena," by Alnis Stakle, a Latvian photographer, curator of Riga Photomonth, and Professor of Photography in Rigas Stradins University.

The first book published by MOKSOP was KOCHETOV, by father and son Viktor and Sergiy Kochetov, representatives of KSOP. The book was printed as a collection of photographs with color drawings plus Viktor Kochetov's memories of his career from 1970s to the 2000s. As of 2020, the first full-length analysis of the school's activity is being published: a monograph by Nadiia Bernard-Kovalchuk, called Kharkiv School of Photography: playing against the apparatus.

=== Significant KSOP events ===
- 1965: Oleg Maliovany exhibited for the first time.
- 1968: Boris Mikhailov started the creation of his series Red (Ukrainian: Червона) and Aesthetic (Ukrainian: Естетська) using the overlays method.
- 1973: Evgeniy Pavlov's first photo series, The Violin (1972), which portrayed a company of naked men at the river, was printed in the Polish Fotografia magazine, along with an article by a Polish critic.
- 1983: The Vremia Group organized their first ever official exhibition in Kharkiv, where they introduced the Vremia Group's art and shared their unique aesthetic principles with the artistic circles of the city.
- 1987–1988: Misha Pedan put together two photography exhibitions in Kharkiv F-87 and F-88.
- 1987–1991: the Ukrainian experimental art union "Panorama" was in operation, with Boris Mikhailov in charge of the photography department. Members of the union were Kharkiv photographers Mikhailov, Pavlov, Solonsky, Pyatkovka, Kochetov, Bratkov, Manko, Starko, and a number of painters. The union created exhibitions in Kharkiv and Moscow as well as a number of international events in Russia, Czech Republic, Finland and Germany.
- 1989: The Kharkiv School of Photography and its members were mentioned in an article about Soviet avant-garde photography in the French Photo magazine. Several Kharkiv photographers, including Suprun and Pavlov, were mentioned in a monograph called "Photographic poetry," published in Moscow.
- 1993: Solonsky's BodyArt exhibition at the "Up/Down" gallery opening.
- 1993–1997: A Kharkiv underground "Up/Down" gallery became a center of non-conformist art under leadership of Sergey Bratkov, Boris Mikhailov, Sergey Bratkov, Sergiy Solonsky, Igor Manko, and Igor Chursin.
- In the mid-1990s, interest in KSOP grew rapidly. There were a number of articles about Kharkiv artists, including reviews of their exhibitions and projects. Articles about Maliovany and Suprun were printed in a revived Lviv Light and Shadow magazine. The Center of Modern Art in Kyiv was opened, and discussions and research between local and international specialists resulted in references of "the new Kharkiv photography" as modern art.
- 1993: Boris Mikhailov's work became a part of the joint exhibition New Photography 9 in the Museum of Modern Art, in New York alongside works by Mark Steinmetz, Beat Streuli, and Christopher Giglio.
- 1994: Boris and Vita Mikhailov, Sergey Bratkov and Sergiy Solonsky co-founded the Fast Reaction Group to participate in the "actual art" movement. They worked at the intersection of art intervention, performance art, and installation art.
- By 1995, Ukrainian photography was known in the US and Europe. In 1995, The New York Times printed an overview of an exhibition of Ukrainian photography in the Zimmerli Museum in the US. Kharkiv photographers featured strongly on the list of Ukrainian artists mentioned in the article.
- 1995: A monograph in honor of Boris Mikhailov came out in Stuttgart. This was considered his official step into international fame, after multiple exhibitions in Berlin, Amsterdam, Paris, and other major cities.
- 1996: Andriy Avdeyenko opened the Palitra art gallery. The gallery hosted exhibitions for a number of significant art projects and spurred the development of art photography in Kharkiv. It closed in 2005.
- 2002, 2011: Boris Mikhailov's Case History photo collection was exhibited in the Saatchi gallery in London (2002); the New Museum in New York (2011); and the Museum of Modern Art in New York (2011). The New York exhibitions became a significant milestone in the history of Ukrainian art.
- 2010: Misha Pedan founded the Ukrainian Photographic Alternative union, which united Ukrainian artists who applied innovative ideas in photography instead of traditional practices.
- 2012: KSOP members Boris Mikhailov, Sergey Bratkov, Viktor Kochetov, Evgeniy Pavlov, Roman Pyatkovka, Vladyslav Krasnoshchok, and Vasylisa Nezabarom participated in the Fotofest 2012 Biennial in Houston, Texas.
- 2013: The Shilo Group presented their photo projects Timoschenko's Escape and UIA Händehoch.
- 2014: Boris Mikhailov photographed events during the Ukrainian revolution. The Shilo Group members Sergiy Lebedynskyy and Vladyslav Krasnoshchok also photographed the Ukrainian Euromaidan; those photos were published in a book, Euromaidan.
- 2015: The Shilo Group exhibited at the Rencontres d'Arles Festival in France.
- 2015: For the first time, Sergiy Lebedynskyy exhibited his Arabart Spit/Healing Muds photo project in the US.
- 2015: An exhibition called Borderline. 1985–2004 presented one of the biggest collections of Ukrainian art to date. It was held in PinchukArtCentre and included works of the best-known Kharkiv School photographers, Mikhailov and Bratkov, as well as other 1990s photographers from the New Wave and Odesa Conceptualism Schools.
- 2017: KSOP was represented by Vladyslav Krasnoshchok in his photo project Karibochki, by Sergiy Lebedynskyy in his exhibition Kharkiv. 18+, and by Sasha Maslov, a younger Kharkiv photography representative, at a photo exhibition at the Odesa//Batumi Photo Days photo festival.
- 2017: The Avant-garde Kharkiv project (Ukrainian: Місто Ха. Харків авангардний), a study of the preceding 100 years of Kharkiv visual art, was held in Kyiv. Works by several Kharkiv photographers, including Mikhailov, Pavlov, Bratkov, Kochetov, and Pyatkovka, were presented.
- 2018: KSOP was the subject of research for Halyna Hleba's 2018 lecture, "Kharkiv School of Photography: between politics and erotic."
- 2018: An exhibition of Evgeniy Pavlov's main projects was held in the context of Paris Photo 2018.
- 2018: A series of exhibitions with works by KSOP photographers were held in Poltava's "Jump" gallery. A series of exhibitions, generally known under the name "Body policy" (Ukrainian: Політика тіла) was put together with the help of scientists and collectors Tetyana and Borys Grynyov and curated by Halyna Hleba and Viktoria Bavykina.
- 2019: The Kyiv Photo Book Festival, the first photo book festival in Ukraine history, was held. Local and international photographers, publishers, and galleries, as well as Museum of Kharkiv School of Photography and Rodovid Press, took part in the event. KSOP was represented by the book KOCHETOV, published by MOKSOP, and the book Apartment 20, by Roman Pyatkovka, which contained Soviet and post-Soviet pictures of the 1980s–1990s.
- 2018–2019: MOKSOP held several exhibitions by Sergiy and Viktor Kochetov, Oleksandr Suprun, and Sergiy Solonsky in the COME IN gallery in Kharkiv.
- 2019: Evgeniy Pavlov's Freedom Street exhibition was held in the Kyiv art space SET. Some of Pavlov's works were exhibited for the first time, along with well-known works such as The Violin.
- 2019: The exhibition Forbidden Image was held in the PinchukArtCentre, with works by Boris Mikhailov and other members of different KSOP generations.
- 2020: The exhibition Revisions was held in Kharkiv with Pyatkovka and Igor Chekachkov, photographer and the founder of the Chekachkov Photo Academy, as the curators. Revisions presented works of 42 artists (students of the academy) from Ukraine and abroad, and discussions were held in regard to new photography techniques and the history of Kharkiv photography.
- 2020: The Kharkiv Photo Forum was held in a successful attempt to unite global scientific and cultural institutions for research and development of the Kharkiv School of Photography.
- 2020: Ukrzaliznytsia, by former railway conductress Julie Poly, was published. This book was the result of her education in the Ukrainian State Academy of Railway Transport and her studies of the KSOP traditions and methods.

== Artistic principles and methods ==
=== Formation and relationship with socialist realism ===
Considered one of the most notable movements of Ukrainian art during the Soviet era, the Kharkiv School of Photography originated in the 1970s as an underground non-conformist art phenomenon. Its artistic dogmas and methods were aimed at fighting Soviet traditions and common propaganda, which were incorporated into photography via the photographic doctrines and methods dictated by the socialist realism art style.

Socialist realism, officially adopted as "the only true method" of Soviet art in 1934, was intended to suppress the 1920s avant-garde movement principles and freedom of expression in art, and was considered one of the first signs of repression in the Soviet Union. Propagandistic influence on artists from different artistic fields promoted a modified representation of reality (or "oversimplified and quasioptimistic depiction and glorification of the Soviet reality"). Due to socialist realism tenets and the government's severe censorship, Soviet photographers had a very narrow range of expression, depicting only "beautiful" aspects of Soviet reality.

Bound by socialist realism dogmas, the first Kharkiv School of Photography members (the Vremia Group) sometimes fought against them and sometimes tinkered with them, incorporating them into their art; but instead of showing a paradisiacal reality, they focused on changing photography. They tried to display reality as it was, including social issues and the cruelty of life. According to Roman Pyatkovka, one of the representatives of KSOP, the aesthetic of Kharkiv photographers largely depended on the artists' confrontation with the well-established rules of that time, challenging the government's desire to censor and control artistic activity. In search of new artistic expression, they showed behind-the-scenes glimpses of the Soviet "ideological facade" created by commonplace socialist realism.

=== Avant-garde traditions ===
The city of Kharkiv is known for its strong avant-garde tradition. For example, the city's artistic school, which later turned into an institute, was considered "the last refuge of Soviet avant-garde." The Kharkiv manor "Krasnaya polyana" was perceived as the center of avant-garde art in the beginning of the 20th century, as artists like Velimir Khlebnikov, Vladimir Mayakovsky, Boris Pasternak, Vasyl Yermylov, Boris Kosarev and others lived and worked there. Avant-garde style flourished in various forms in Kharkiv, including architectural constructivism represented by the globally-known Gosprom building and conceptualism, which focused on connecting images and words in art. The Unfinished Dissertation, by Boris Mikhailov, is one of the best-known conceptualistic art projects of KSOP's first generation of artists in the world.

Despite the fact that the members of KSOP believed their artistic photography did not rely on any history or tradition, today their work is considered an extension of the avant-garde style widely popular in the 1920s.

Avant-garde traditions were taught through a chain of teacher-student relationships, starting with Vasyl Yermylov's and Boris Kosarev's (and a number of other artists of their generation) avant-garde artistic activity in the beginning of the 20th century. They passed their experience on to new generations of artists, who used avant-garde methods and rules from 1950 to 1990. One of their students, Volodymyr Grygorov, supervised some of the key creators of the first KSOP artistic union.

Small details indicated that KSOP artists were avant-gardists, such as a symbol of an owl (a sign that is connected to the Kharkiv avant-garde history and used by the Vremia Group); or new photography methods, that referenced futurist ideas of the beginning of 20th century. Avant-garde traditions are still clearly traceable in the art of the newest generation of Kharkiv artists in the 2000s, who keep experimenting and use social media platforms to bring the connection between image and text to a new level.

=== The methodology of the Vremia Group and its aftermath ===
The Kharkiv School of Photography is known for extreme experimentations with photography techniques and methods. Developing avant-garde principles and navigating around socialist realism dogmas, members of the Vremia Group invented their own visual language and used irony in their art — the latter considered an important component of the Kharkiv school.

Expanding on older practices (montage, collage, and others), Kharkiv photographers came up with the techniques, methods, and principles that today are considered their signature inventions. One of the first generation's key innovations, "blow theory" (or "the theory of stroke"), implied that photography needed to convey a strong statement, and a shocking element was the only way to make an artistic impact.

Boris Mikhailov, one of the leaders of Kharkiv artistic photography and one of the key photographers of the former Soviet Union, is credited for several inventions in photography. The method of overlays (sometimes called superimpositions, or sandwiches) involved overlaying two color slide film frames and projecting them onto a screen as a slideshow, or printing them onto color photo paper. It created the opportunity to use a number of different photo combinations with clean, accurate detailing. Another Mikhailov invention, the concept of "bad photography," focused on creating defective black-and-white photos, often out of focus or with low contrast (mostly due to the lack of professional quality photo equipment). It was created in opposition to the "optimistic narrative" of the Soviet Union, as a way to critique Soviet ideas of portraying real life. Later, some critics called this concept "the first example of conceptualism in photography in the USSR." Mikhailov also utilized the lurik technique, which included retouching, enlarging, hand-coloring, and montage of a picture or several pictures. It was thanks to his partnership with Moscow artist Ilya Kabakov and the Ermitazh union that photographic "sots art" appeared.

Their collaboration also launched the livre d'artist (or artistic books) movement. This method was revived and became recognized in the 2010s.

Mikhailov's photography books, which appeared in the 1980s, were another significant contribution to the conceptual art of that time. His 1985 Unfinished Dissertation, in particular, was considered an artistic challenge. His books became new aesthetic setters and a place to present the manifesto of Kharkiv artistic underground movements. They showed people's personal lives, illnesses, relationships, family secrets, and other subjects uncommon to art at the time. The books also illustrated a variety of aspects of Kharkiv modernism, like the concept of "new documentary," and art concepts introduced in Jacques Derrida's interpretation of parergon (ancient Greek philosophical concept) and in the book Mythologies by Roland Barthes. The concept of "new documentary" was presented by Mikhailov as a new artistic method of "quiet adjustment" and implied that new photographs should look old from the moment they were taken.

The equidensitometry technique was the specialty of another member of the Vremia Group, Oleg Maliovany. Today this method can be achieved by using a Photoshop filter, but in the 1970s, it required a complicated technical process and skilled manual work to achieve "'unphotographic' reality in a photo".

Not all KSOP methods were completely new; some of them were reinvented old techniques. For example, black-and-white-image hand-coloring existed in the 1920s for coloring postcards, and Soviet Union studio photographs were hand-colored or chemically toned until the 1960s or 1970s. Nevertheless, black-and-white photography hand-coloring became widely known as another new conceptual decision of the photography of the 1970s.

Photomontage was also widely used by different artists in the 1920s through the 1960s, and although this method wasn't the invention of Kharkiv photographers, they did master it and add their own tricks. One well-known example was the "Springtime in the Forest (Lilies of the Valley)" (1975) montage by Oleksandr Suprun, where the same flower fragment was used 51 times. Later, Evgeniy Pavlov mastered the art of photomontage using black-and-white photos with manual coloring and scratching. Another Kharkiv technique widely discussed by critics from abroad was the "blind spots" method, which was used to cover authors' sharp statements and in opposition to the "see-through aesthetics" promoted by country's officials.

The combination of several techniques was common for several Kharkiv photographers. Evgeniy Pavlov experimented with this for his 1994 Total Photography project; he used every technique he knew of to prove that any photograph can become a work of art.

In the middle of the 1990s, KSOP members such as Boris Mikhailov and Evgeniy Pavlov experimented with mixing photography and painting. They found that combining two art forms enabled more artistic freedom.

One trend established by Kharkiv photographers was "multi-authored" art, superimposing works of different photographers. It was used in Mikhailov's Luriki, in works of the Fast Reaction Group (made up of Boris and Vita Mikhailov, Sergiy Solonsky, and Sergey Bratkov), and in works by Evgeniy Pavlov and Volodymyr Shaposhnikov.

The Vremia Group's Oleg Maliovany became a member whose photomontages were noticed abroad. Mikhailov's "overlays" and Suprun's photomontages were also considered one-of-a-kind Soviet artwork for their novelty and grotesque, dramatic effects. Their colleague, Sergiy Solonsky, who widely used photomontage in 1980s and 90s, is considered to have begun an aesthetic revolution in Ukrainian photography.

=== Next generations' methodology ===
The next generation of KSOP worked as separate artists or gathered in new groups developing further and diversifying photography subjects and techniques. Roman Pyatkovka, who joined the Kharkiv school in the 1980s, used common KSOP techniques in his Fantoms of the 30s project, dedicated to the Great Famine of 1932–1933 in Ukraine. In this photo project, Pyatkovka used multiple reproduction of images with hand scratching. In his series The Games of Libido (1995) he also invented a new technique called "negative photomontage:" he glued black-and-white negatives onto a glass plaque and printed the photo while the glue was corroding the film, producing a new visual effect. Another non-aligned artist, Viktor Kochetov developed the technique of photographs hand coloring through a "brutal and uncompromised approach," applying color to his originally black-and-white images.

The Gosprom Group (named after one of Kharkiv's historical buildings) was inspired by their predecessors and developed Kharkiv photography into different genres. The Gosprom Group developed documentary photography and the method of "straight photography" (or candid photos).

One member of the Gosprom Group, Volodymyr Starko, worked exclusively on black-and-white photography and avoided cropping his images. Another member, Misha Pedan, developed further the group's documentary style in his 2011 "Stereo_types" project, in which he combined paired images. His colleague, Sergey Bratkov, worked on photos connecting "brutality and tenderness, comedy and tragedy," which are often considered main characteristics of Kharkiv School. In his work Chapiteau Moscow, Bratkov fused photographs in collage, creating new, surreal images with layered meanings. He often ignored common photography rules, such as using a central focus or paying attention to light and shadows.

In the 1990s, other KSOP methods appeared, such as the "new Ukrainian photomontage;" photography books; social art; conceptual, tachist, and neo-primitive photography, and others.

=== The third wave of Kharkiv photographers ===
The third wave of KSOP artists was the Shilo Group, formed in 2010. The group wrote itself into KSOP history by remaking Mikhailov's Unfinished Dissertation art book project naming their book Finished Dissertation (2013). Art historian Tetiana Pavlova defined Finished Dissertation as an "objets trouvés," or found object genre.

The Shilo Group was also inspired by the legacy of Boris Mikhailov, close communication with the authors of different generations and tradition of collaborative action in Kharkiv photography, presented by the Vremia Group, the Gosprom Group, and the Fast Reaction Group. They elaborated the Gosprom Group's method and added the usage of lith print technique.

The group made their projects more intense and straightforward in terms of context, color texture, and dialogue with the viewer. Members of the Shilo Group retained the "dualism" of their predecessors' art, but reversed it: while "blind spots" covered the first generation's sharp statements in regard to ideology or propaganda under more subtle layers, the younger generation, put their sharp statements on the surface, with more "naive" subjects underneath. Their work is largely based on Kharkiv and its artists, including photographers of previous generations and has strong social and political contexts.

Sergiy Lebedynskyy, a current member of the Shilo Group, works with old equipment and old techniques. His photos from the Arabat Spit/Healing Muds project were shot on a Soviet-made panoramic camera with outdated Soviet film and printed on Soviet photo paper.

== Examples of KSOP photographers ==
=== Boris Mikhailov ===
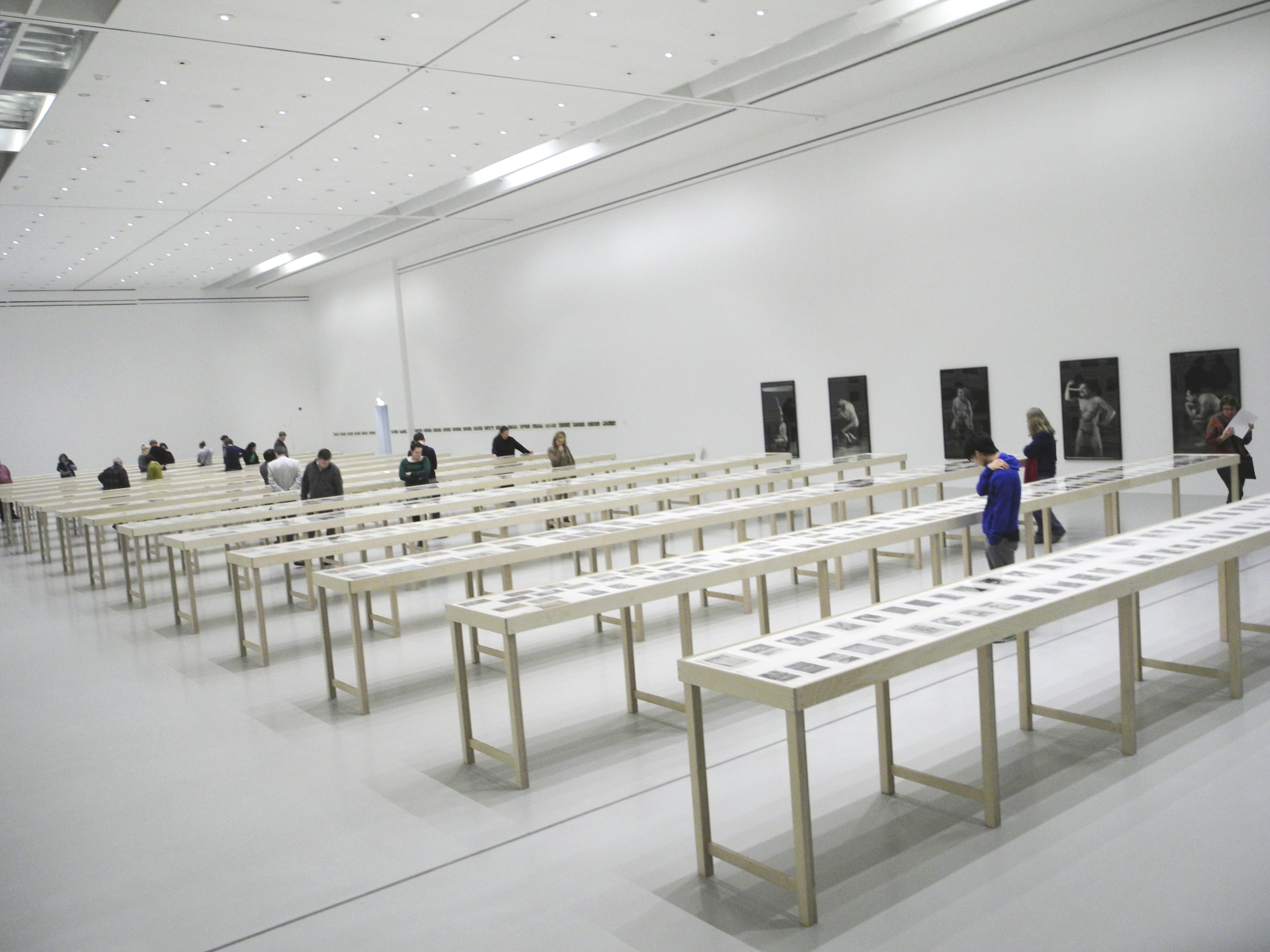
Boris Mikhailov's exhibition in the Sprengel Museum in Hanover, Germany.

Often associated with the whole post-Soviet art wave, Mikhailov is considered the best-known Ukrainian contemporary artist/photographer, and one of the key photographers of the former USSR. A representative of the Vremia Group, Mikhailov is credited for creating a "whole period in photography history" and generating multiple new methods and ideas for the new photography aesthetic. He was closely watched by the KGB, fired from jobs several times, and almost imprisoned for his art.

Mikhailov's photography started to appear abroad in 1980s, and soon the Kharkiv School of Photography was known on an international level. During the 1960s through 1980s, Mikhailov created several well-known photo projects, such as Yesterday's Sandwich, Luriki, and the Red Series, but the two that made him a globally-recognized artist were Case History (published as a book in 1999) and Unfinished Dissertation, which is listed among the 10 best photo books in the World. The Case History photo project, considered Mikhailov's most controversial work, was created at the edge of fine art and documentary photography. It portrays the USSR collapse and its influence on the life of Kharkiv society through pictures of homeless people. The Case History photos became Mikhailov's signature work, exhibited multiple times in progressive international museums and galleries, and Mikhailov's work in general is considered a classic of world photography. However, Ukrainian society still doesn't really understand or appreciate his art, and rejects it. Although Mikhailov emigrated to Germany, he often visits Ukraine on personal and public matters, such as working on projects, giving lectures, or participating in exhibitions.

Mikhailov's works are on permanent exhibit at the Metropolitan Museum of Art (New York), Russian Museum (St. Petersburg), Japanese National Museum of Art (Osaka), and many other modern art museums in Amsterdam, Hanover, Paris, Venice, Boston, Krakow, Munich, etc. In 2018, the Tate Modern (London) dedicated a separate exhibition hall to his work. Mikhailov is the only Ukrainian to receive the Hasselblad Foundation International Award in Photography (2000). Among his other awards are the Coutts Contemporary Art Foundation Award (1996), the Citibank Private Bank Photography Prize (2001), the Generalsatellite Corporation art prize (2003), and the Kaiser prize (2015). In 2008, he became a member of the Academy of Visual Arts in Berlin.

=== Sergey Bratkov ===
Sergey Bratkov, one of Mikhailov's "disciples" was known as "one of the most promising" Kharkiv School representatives during its formative years and later became one of the best-known photography classics of Ukraine and Russia with his works exhibiting in Belgium, USA, Switzerland, Spain, France, and Germany.

Bratkov started his artistic journey in the early 1980s, combining many artistic genres in particular photography and painting, and later added cinema to the mix. He started to paint professionally in 1989 and at the same time worked on photo collages, hand-coloring and other photo transformation techniques. In 1993, co-founded and actively worked within the Fast Reaction Group with Boris and Vita Mikhailov, Sergiy Solonsky.

Combining his artistic interests in various projects and performances he created notable projects: The Cupboard (We All Eat Each Other, 1991), which consisted of photographs put inside water- or air-filled glass jars; The Parcel, where Bratkov put photographs into a concrete slab; and The Frozen Landscapes (1994), created as tribute to 45 Kharkiv homeless people who froze to death.

In 2000, Bratkov moved to Moscow, where he soon became recognized and discussed for his photo series Kids. In 2007, he represented Ukraine at the Venice Biennale and in 2010, Bratkov received Russia's "Innovation" contemporary art award for a video installation.

Bratkov never limited his subjects, taking photos of female soldiers, businessmen, sailors, drunks and prostitutes, and other people of any age, gender, or social status. In late 2000s, from photographing separate heroes, as he referred to them, Bratkov transferred his attention to group photos and large crowds of people exploring post-Soviet society. This tendency was clearly traceable in a number of his projects including "Chapiteau Moscow" in 2012. Another work that explored and analyzed Soviet and post-Soviet reality, as well as the question of identity was the photo series "Empire of Dreams" created in 1988 and re-invented in 2016–2017. In 2017, the series was nominated for the Shevchenko National Prize.

=== Evgeniy Pavlov ===
Together with Mikhailov, Pavlov helped make the Kharkiv School of Photography into a phenomenon of contemporary art. His work has been exhibited in the US, Germany, France, and Japan. Pavlov liked old photography technologies more than modern ones; as of 2018, he had never tried digital photography and remained loyal to the film process. Pavlov left photography for some time to pursue his interest in cinema but returned to photography in 1981. In 1988, he presented the Archive Series project. Pavlov worked with collage and color retouching; his Total Photography project combined those techniques. In a span of four years (1990–1994), Pavlov created 100 photos for the project. Later, Pavlov studied the painting of photographs and worked with a painter, Volodymyr Shaposhnikov. According to Pavlov, their last joint work, The Second Heaven, "summed up" their Soviet career paths.

=== Roman Pyatkovka ===
As a young man, Pyatkovka left his well-paid job as a lighting design director in the Kharkiv Young Spectator's Theatre to work in a Kharkiv factory's photography workshop inspired by Maliovany, Mikhailov and Pavlov. As of 2020, Pyatkovka is a professor of Media Communications in the National University of Kharkiv, a co-founder of the National Union of Ukrainian Photographers and a coordinator of the artistic union Ukrainian Photographic Alternative. He was named Best Conceptual Photographer of the Year at Sony World Forum 2013. Some of Pyatkovka's works are a part of collections in the Museum of Modern Photography (Chicago, USA), Museum Ken Dame (Brescia, Italy), and Artothek (Nuremberg, Germany).

== See also ==
- Jury Rupin
- Boris Mikhailov (photographer)
- Socialist realism
- Ukrainian avant-garde
- Ukrainian underground

== Literature cited ==
- "Sergiy Solonsky", MOKSOP, Kharkiv: Museum of Kharkiv School of Photography
- Peiffer, Prudence (ed.), "New Photography 9: Christopher Giglio, Boris Mihailov, Mark Steinmetz, and Beat Streuli", MoMA, Manhattan: Museum of Modern Art
- "about shilo", cargocollective.com, Portland: Cargo
- "Kharkiv regional photoclub", MOKSOP, Kharkiv: Museum of Kharkiv School of Photography
- "Fotofest 2012 Biennial", photography-now.com, Berlin: Photography-Now, March 16, 2012
- "Akt nepovinovenija. Telo kak protest v har'kovskoj fotografii 1970-2010 gg." Акт неповиновения. Тело как протест в харьковской фотографии 1970-2010 гг. [An act of disobedience. Body as a protest in Kharkiv photography 1970-2010], cultobzor.ru (in Russian), Moscow: Cultobzor, December 1, 2013, archived from the original on September 11, 2019
- Lozhkina, Alisa, ed. (April 14, 2017), "V Odesі pokazhut' harkіvs'ku andegraundnu fotografіju 70‒90-h rokіv" В Одесі покажуть харківську андеграундну фотографію 70‒90-х років [Kharkiv underground photography of the 70s and 90s will be shown in Odesa], artukraine.com.ua (in Ukrainian), Kyiv: ART UKRAINE
- Konstantinov, Oleg, ed. (April 20, 2017), ""Kazn' produktov" i "Narjadnaja publika" — fotofestival' v Muzee sovremennogo iskusstva Odessy" «Казнь продуктов» и «Нарядная публика» — фотофестиваль в Музее современного искусства Одессы ["Execution of groceries" and "Smart audience" - photo festival in the Museum of Modern Art of Odesa], dumskaya.net (in Russian), Odesa: Dumskaja
- "NeMoj razgovor: "Revizii" s odnoj vystavki (foto)" НеМой разговор: "Ревизии" с одной выставки (фото) [NotMy conversation: "Revisions" from one exhibition (photo)], glavnoe.ua (in Russian), Kharkiv: Glavnoe, July 9, 2020
- Akage, Anna (September 24, 2018b), Naudet, Jean Jacques (ed.), "From Ukraine. The first story: Archives by Alexander Glyadyelov", loeildelaphotographie.com, Paris: The Eye of Photography, OCLC 883801381
- Akage, Anna (November 21, 2018a), Naudet, Jean Jacques (ed.), "From Ukraine: The Time of Yevgeniy Pavlov", loeildelaphotographie.com, Paris: The Eye of Photography, OCLC 883801381
- Balashova, Ol'ga (May 31, 2015), Musayeva, Sevgil (ed.), "Neprostye otnoshenija iskusstva i obshhestva v PinchukArtCentre" Непростые отношения искусства и общества в PinchukArtCentre [The uneasy relationship between art and society at the PinchukArtCentre], Ukrayinska Pravda (in Russian), Kyiv: Kyiv MediaHub
- Bernard-Kovalchuk, Nadiia (August 10, 2019), "Misha Pedan: All the Fears at the End of the Soviet Era Were Connected with the Fact that It Was Unclear Where the Danger Was Coming from", MOKSOP, Kharkiv: Museum of Kharkiv School of Photography
- Bilash, Ksenija (December 21, 2017), Koshkina, Sonja (ed.), "Paradoksy avangardu "Mista HA"" Парадокси авангарду «Міста ХА» [Paradoxes of the avant-garde "City Kha"], lb.ua (in Ukrainian), Kyiv: LB.ua
- Bilash, Ksenija (September 8, 2020), Koshkina, Sonja (ed.), "Sergej Lebedinskij: "V sovremennoj fotografii ty ustaesh' ot ogromnogo kolichestva samorefleksii"" Сергей Лебединский: «В современной фотографии ты устаешь от огромного количества саморефлексии» [Sergey Lebedinsky: "You get tired of a huge amount of self-reflection in modern photography"], lb.ua (in Russian), Kyiv: LB.ua
- Bojarinov, Denis (June 30, 2014), "Chto takoe postsovetskij chelovek?" Что такое постсоветский человек? [What is a post-Soviet person?], ovcharenko.art (in Russian), Moscow: Ovcharenko Gallery
- Bratkov, Sergіj (2017), "Serіja robіt "Іmperіja snіv"" Серія робіт «Імперія снів» [The Empire of Dreams series of art works], knpu.gov.ua (in Ukrainian), Kyiv: Taras Shevchenko National Prize
- Candrowicz, Krzysztof (July 6, 2015), "Shilo Group", rencontres-arles.com, Arles: Rencontres d'Arles
- Chuzha, Julia (November 30, 2015), "Misha Pedan: "Taking and giving to others is the logic of working in the art world"", Bird In Flight (in Russian), New York: Depositphotos
- Djogot', Ekaterina (July 3, 2008), "Sergej Bratkov: "Tema gadosti stanovitsja glavnoj"" Сергей Братков: «Тема гадости становится главной» [Sergey Bratkov: "The topic of nastiness becomes the main one"], OpenSpace (in Russian), Moscow: ArtMedia Group
- German, Lyzaveta (November 25, 2013), Prytula, Olena (ed.), "Pokazat' vremja. Retrospektiva Borisa Mihajlova v Har'kove" Показать время. Ретроспектива Бориса Михайлова в Харькове [Show time. Retrospective of Boris Mikhailov in Kharkiv], Ukrayinska Pravda (in Russian), Kyiv: Kyiv MediaHub
- Higgins, Jackie (2014), The world atlas of street photography, New Haven: Yale University Press, ISBN 978-0-300-20716-3, LCCN 2014940105, OCLC 902994387
- Jakovlenko, Kateryna (November 7, 2018), Koshkina, Sonja (ed.), "Galyna Gleba: "Mecenatstvo legko peretvoryty na instrument manipuljacij"" Галина Глеба: "Меценатство легко перетворити на інструмент маніпуляцій" [Halyna Hleba: "Patronage is easy to turn into a tool of manipulation"], lb.ua (in Ukrainian), Kyiv: LB.ua
- Kalach, Stanislav (November 9, 2018), "V Har'kove otkryvaetsja muzej fotografii" В Харькове открывается музей фотографии [Museum of photography will be opened in Kharkiv], Bird In Flight (in Russian), New York: Depositphotos
- Kas'janova, Dar'ja (August 17, 2020), ""Chtoby snimat' vyshe tret'ego jetazha, nuzhno bylo oficial'noe razreshenie": Publikuem fragment iz knigi o Har'kovskoj shkole fotografii" «Чтобы снимать выше третьего этажа, нужно было официальное разрешение»: Публикуем фрагмент из книги о Харьковской школе фотографии ["We needed official permission to shoot above the third floor": we are publishing an excerpt from a book about the Kharkiv School of Photography], Bird In Flight (in Russian), New York: Depositphotos
- Koval', Valerija (September 9, 2019), Sokolova, Natasha (ed.), "Ne propusty: 10 stolychnyh vystavok sentjabrja" Не пропусти: 10 столичных выставок сентября [Don't Miss: 10 Metropolitan Exhibitions in September], vgorode.ua (in Russian), Kyiv: UMH group
- Krakovich, Dmitriy (March 6, 2019), Naudet, Jean Jacques (ed.), "Kyiv Photo Book International Festival", loeildelaphotographie.com, Paris: The Eye of Photography, OCLC 883801381
- Kunycyna, Alisa (June 27, 2020), Zubanjuk, Viktor (ed.), "U Kyjevi vidkrylasja vystavka vsesvitn'o vidomogo ukrai'ns'kogo fotografa" У Києві відкрилася виставка всесвітньо відомого українського фотографа [An exhibition of the world-famous Ukrainian photographer has opened in Kyiv], lenta.ua (in Ukrainian), Kyiv: Lenta.UA
- Little, Myles (May 31, 2011), "Wrecked: Boris Mikhailov's "Case History"", Time, New York: Time Inc., ISSN 0040-781X, LCCN 25011669, OCLC 1767509
- Lozhkina, Alisa (July 30, 2011), Prytula, Olena (ed.), "Zhestokij diagnoz ot Borisa Mihajlova" Жестокий диагноз от Бориса Михайлова [Severe diagnosis from Boris Mikhailov], Ukrayinska Pravda (in Russian), Kyiv: Kyiv MediaHub
- Manko, Igor (2015), Muffoletto, Roberto (ed.), "The Kharkiv School of Fine Art Photography", Journal on Images and Culture, Los Angeles: VASA Project
- Pantall, Colin (August 19, 2020), Oliverio, Giuseppe (ed.), "The Wonderful World of the Ukrainian State Railway Transport Network", phmuseum.com, London: PHmuseum
- Pavlova, Tetjana, Szilagyi, Sandor (ed.), "Avanguard red and green. From "Blow theory" to "Kontact"", VASA, Vienna: VASA Project
- Pavlova, Tetjana, Szilagyi, Sandor (ed.), "Andrey Avdeyenko", VASA, Vienna: VASA Project
- Pavlova, Tetjana (2007), Sokoljúk, Ljudmíla (ed.), Fotomystectvo v hudozhnij kul'turi Harkova ostann'oi' tretyny XX stolittja (na materiali pejzazhnogo zhanru)(Doctoral dissertation) Фотомистецтво в художній культурі Харкова останньої третини XX століття (на матеріалі пейзажного жанру) [Photo art in the artistic culture of Kharkiv of the last third of the XX century (on the material of the landscape genre)] (in Ukrainian), Kharkiv: Academy of Design and Arts KSADA Kharkiv
- Pavlova, Tetjana (2012), ""Finished dissertation" by Shilo Group", cargocollective.com, Portland: Cargo
- Pavlova, Tetjana (2014), Mystci ukrai'ns'kogo avangardu v Harkovi Мистці українського авангарду в Харкові [Artists of the Ukrainian avant-garde in Kharkiv] (in Ukrainian), Kharkiv: Drukarnja «Madryd», ISBN 978-617-7050-49-9, OCLC 904390984
- Pavlova, Tetjana (May 29, 2017), Baldynjuk, Vira (ed.), "Cymmetrychnyj zhest Myhajlovu: Gruppa "Shylo"" Cимметричный жест Михайлову: Группа «Шило» [Symmetrical gesture to Mikhailov: The 'Shilo' Group], Korydor (in Russian), Kyiv: CCA Foundation
- Pavlova, Tetjana (2018), Sokoljúk, Ljudmíla (ed.), Avangard v obrazotvorchomu mystectvi Harkova ХХ stolittja (Postdoctoral dissertation) Aвангард в образотворчому мистецтвi Харкова ХХ столiття [Avant-garde in the fine arts of Kharkiv in XX century] (in Ukrainian), Lviv: Lviv National Academy of Arts
- Pavlova, Tetjana (August 3, 2020b), Kalyta, Nastja (ed.), "Ob odnodnevnoj vystavke gruppy "Vremja" v Har'kovskom Dome uchenyh" Об однодневной выставке группы «Время» в Харьковском Доме ученых [The one-day exhibition of the "Vremia" group in the Kharkiv House of Scientists], Your Art (in Russian), Kyiv: Support Your Art
- Pozdeeva, Anna (January 31, 2020), "Why Boris Mikhailov Is Considered a Genius Worldwide. And Not Liked Back Home", Bird In Flight, New York: Depositphotos
- Rafferty, Rebecca (January 21, 2015), Towler, Marry Anna (ed.), ""Arabat Spit/Healing Muds" by Sergiy Lebedynskyy", City Newspaper, vol. 44, no. 20, Rochester: WMT Publications, Inc., p. 18, ISSN 1551-3262, OCLC 5685007
- Sanduljak, Alina (November 21, 2018), "Vospominanija o Har'kovskoj shkole fotografii: Viktor Kochetov pro Mihajlova, cenzuru i sjemki na zakaz" Воспоминания о Харьковской школе фотографии: Виктор Кочетов про Михайлова, цензуру и съемки на заказ [Memories of the Kharkiv School of Photography: Viktor Kochetov about Mikhailov, censorship and shooting to order], Bird In Flight (in Russian), New York: Depositphotos
- Savchenko, Gleb (April 20, 2018), "Anons: Lekcija Galiny Gleby "Har'kovskaja shkola fotografii: mezhdu politikoj i jerotikoj"" Анонс: Лекция Галины Глебы «Харьковская школа фотографии: между политикой и эротикой» [Announcement: Lecture by Galina Gleba "Kharkiv School of Photography: Between Politics and Erotica".], Bird In Flight (in Russian), New York: Depositphotos
- Sergackova, Ekaterina (March 25, 2016), "Sergej Bratkov: "Menja vsjo vremja okruzhali koshmary. Pojetomu ja, navernoe, nemnozhko mrachnyj"" Сергей Братков: «Меня всё время окружали кошмары. Поэтому я, наверное, немножко мрачный» [Sergey Bratkov: "I was surrounded by nightmares all the time. Therefore, I am probably a little gloomy "], Bird In Flight (in Russian), New York: Depositphotos
- Smyth, Diane (January 15, 2019), Bainbridge, Simon (ed.), "The first-ever Kyiv Photo Book festival", British Journal of Photography, London: 1854 Media, ISSN 0007-1196, LCCN 95640364, OCLC 5928805
- Stakle, Alnis (December 25, 2018), Bainbridge, Simon (ed.), "Best of 2018: Alnis Stakle, Riga Photomonth", British Journal of Photography, London: 1854 Media, ISSN 0007-1196, LCCN 95640364, OCLC 5928805
- Stasjuk, Iryna (November 11, 2018), Saliy, Yulia (ed.), "U Harkovi vidkryvajet'sja muzej fotografii' MOKSOP" У Харкові відкривається музей фотографії MOKSOP [The MOKSOP Museum of Photography will be opened in Kharkiv], hmarochos.kiev.ua (in Ukrainian), Kyiv: Hmarochos
- Teren, Tetjana (September 20, 2008), Doroshenko, Myhajlo (ed.), "Borys Myhajlov: iz fotografii' vyjshlo povitrja..." Борис Михайлов: із фотографії вийшло повітря... [Boris Mikhailov: air came out of the photo...], umoloda.kyiv.ua (in Ukrainian), no. 176, Kyiv: Ukrayina Moloda
- Toomey, Christine (June 3, 2007), "The barefaced cheek of Boris Mikhailov", Sunday Times Magazine, London: Times Newspapers Ltd., OCLC 37334919, archived from the original on October 7, 2008
- Warner, Marigold (January 30, 2019), Bainbridge, Simon (ed.), "Painting Photography: Victor and Sergey Kochetov", British Journal of Photography, London: 1854 Media, ISSN 0007-1196, LCCN 95640364, OCLC 5928805
- Zelenskaja, Dar'ja (July 12, 2013), Shevchuk, Elena (ed.), "Fotografy proslavili Har'kov na ves' mir: foto-fakty" Фотографы прославили Харьков на весь мир: фото-факты [Photographers glorified Kharkiv all over the world: photo facts], Vecherniy Kharkov Вечерний Харьков [Evening Kharkiv] (in Russian), Kharkiv, OCLC 762014020
