= Pessi and Illusia (book) =

1944 book by Yrjö Kokko

- Author: Yrjö Kokko
- Original title: Pessi ja Illusia
- Illustrator: Yrjö Kokko
- Language: Finnish
- Genre: Fairytale
- Publisher: Werner Söderström Osakeyhtiö (WSOY)
- Publication date: April 1944
- Publication place: Finland
- Pages: 231 (1st ed.)
- Awards: Finnish State Literary Award (1945)

Pessi and Illusia (Finnish: Pessi ja Illusia) is a Finnish fairytale written by Yrjö Kokko and first published in 1944 by WSOY.

== Background ==
Kokko was a veterinarian, serving as a veterinary officer in the Finnish Army on the Karelian Isthmus during the Continuation War between Finland and Soviet Union. In late 1941, while missing his children back home, he decided to write them a short Christmas story.

As soon as the story was finished, however, he set about expanding it into a more substantial fairytale; he also illustrated the work with nature photos which he took himself. The entire creative process took three years.

Kokko had been interested in and fascinated by nature since he was a child, and felt that he could instinctively empathise with plants and animals and understand their 'language'. It was his relationship with nature, and his personal experiences on the front, that inspired much of the content.

== Plot ==
Pessi and Illusia tells the story of a menninkäinen (goblin) boy, Pessi, and a fairy girl, Illusia, who live in a forest near the eastern border of Finland, at a time of war. Illusia is an optimist, while Pessi is a gloom-monger, by name as well as by nature: he is named after his father, Pessimist. Additional characters are provided by the forest's many animals and plants. The book consists of a series of vignettes depicting the lives of the characters intertwined with natural phenomena and the events of the human world, including the ongoing war.

== Reception ==
Reviewing the book for the July/August 1944 issue of the Arvosteleva kirjaluettelo book review magazine, literary critic and translator Kyllikki Nohrström said:

Kirjassa on harvinaista, omalaatuista herkkyyttä ja kauneutta; olisi erehdystä pitää sitä pelkkänä lastenkirjana, sillä se viehättää aikuisiakin ja on erityisen suositeltava nuorisolle, tuleville vanhemmille ja äideille luettavaksi kerran yhdessä pienten lasten kanssa.

transl.:
The book has a rare, unique sensitivity and beauty; it would be a mistake to consider it merely a children's book, as it also appeals to adults and is especially recommended for young people, future parents and mothers to read together with young children.

She also recommended that the book be added to the collections of public libraries.

Pessi and Illusia received the Finnish State Literary Award (Valtion Kirjallisuuspalkinto) in 1945.

== Derivative works ==
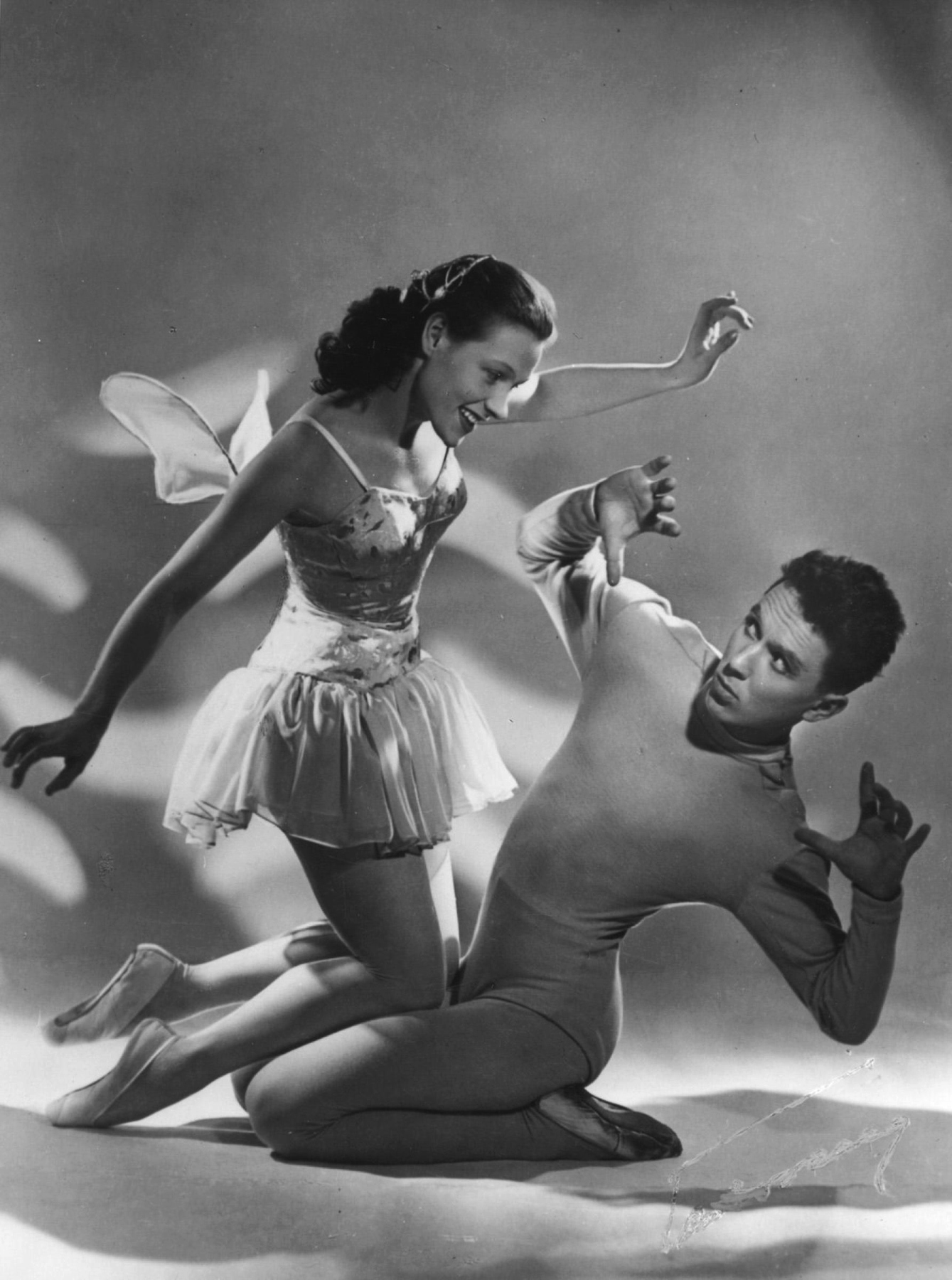
Laine and Värtsi as the lead characters of the 1952 ballet

Pessi and Illusia provides the story for an eponymous ballet-féerie composed by Ahti Sonninen and choreographed by Irja Koskinen. It premiered on the 1952 summer tour of the Finnish National Opera and Ballet, with Heikki Värtsi and Doris Laine dancing the titular roles, respectively. It later received a more formal premiere on the National Opera's home stage in Helsinki on 23 October of the same year.

A 1954 film directed by Jack Witikka is based on the ballet.

The book has also been adapted into a 1984 feature-length film by the same name, directed by Heikki Partanen.

The book inspired the evergreen ballad Päivänsäde ja menninkäinen (lit. 'sunbeam and goblin') by Reino Helismaa. It has been recorded at least 15 times by leading names of Finnish popular music, including Tapio Rautavaara, who according to some estimates performed it more than any other song during his career.

=== Translations ===
- Danish: Jorden og vingerne (Morien A. Kochs, 1948)
- Dutch: Illusia op Arde (V. H. van Ditmar, 1949)
- German: Pessi und Illusia (Wiener Verlag, 2000)
- Italian: Gli amici della foresta (Longanesi, 1951)
- Japanese: Pessi & Illusia (Shobun-Sha, 1975)
- Swedish: Jorden och vingarna (Schildt, 1945)
