= Museum of Children's Theaters =

Museum in Moscow, Russia

Museum of Children's Theaters (Russian: Музей детских театров) is a former museum in Moscow, which existed from 1981 to 2003. Its exhibits were associated with the history of Russian young Spectator's Theatre. Since 2008, it has been opened as a department of children's and puppet theaters of the A.A. Bakhrushin State Central Theater Museum.

== History ==
The Museum of young Spectator's Theatre was opened in 1981 at 12 Soviet Army Street, Moscow. By the beginning of the 2000s, the museum had over 32,000 items in storage. Its main exhibition was associated with the names of leading Russian theater figures, and it reflected the diversity of children's theaters in Russia.

In the museum funds, there were works of theatrical-decorative and decorative-applied art, theater dolls, costumes, and posters. Among the exhibits were memorials to and archives of cultural figures associated with the children's theater, such as Robert Falk, Michael Chekhov, Samuil Marshak, Natalya Sats, Sergey Obraztsov, and V. A. Sperantova. Of particular value was the collection of puppet theaters of the 1910s and 1930s, which included puppets and finger puppets of Moscow artists Efimov, as well as puppets of the St. Petersburg theater under the leadership of E. Demmeni. There were also materials on the activities of children's theaters in the Gulag system, such as sketches, dolls, letters, and memoirs.

In 2003, the Museum of Children's Theaters was closed, and its exhibits were transferred to the A.A. Bakhrushin State Central Theater Museum. In 2008, based on the materials of the Museum of Children's Theaters, the Department of Children's and Puppet Theater Funds was opened. The fund of the department consists of five collections: decorative-visual materials; memorial-clothing; photo-film-phonodocuments; written sources; and posters and programs.
