= Roman Pyatkovka =

Ukrainian photographer (born 1955)

- Роман Пятковка
- Born: 1955 (age 70–71); Kharkiv, Ukrainian SSR
- Known for: Conceptual photography
- Notable work: Soviet Photo (2012)
- Movement: Kharkiv School of Photography
- Awards: Conceptual Photographer of the Year, Sony World Photography Awards (2013)
- Website: Official website

Roman Pyatkovka (Роман Пятковка; born 1955 in Kharkiv) is a Ukrainian conceptual photographer who was part of the Kharkiv School of Photography movement.

== Biography ==
Pyatkovka studied electroenergetics at Kharkiv Polytechnic Institute and lighting design at Kyiv National I. K. Karpenko-Kary Theatre, Cinema and Television University. He worked for at the Young Spectator's Theatre in Kharkiv between 1979 and 1984 before dedicating himself more fully to photography. He joined the National Society of Photo Artists of Ukraine in 1989 and later began teaching at VN Karazin Kharkiv National University. He was part of the "middle generation" of the Kharkiv School of Photography movement, where he took photos, primarily of nude women, in a "deliberately simple, amateur-looking" style. This subject was considered pornographic by the Soviets, meaning that Pyatkovka and his contemporaries were considered underground photographers. In his 2012 series Soviet Photo, Pyatkovka used overlays and hand-colouring to combine and juxtapose his own photos with the propaganda pieces from Sovetskoe Foto in a mashup or "found" style. This project won him the Conceptual Photographer of the Year award at the 2013 Sony World Photography Awards.

Pyatkovka has exhibited worldwide, such as at Moscow's Multimedia Art Museum, Museum of Modern Art and National Centre for Contemporary Arts; Museum of Ken Damy in Italy; Chicago's Museum of Contemporary Photography; The Navigator Foundation in Boston; and ARTOTHEK in Nürnberg. His work appears in books including Toisinnäkijät (1988), Co je Fotografie (1989), Un Nouveau Pausage Humain (1998), Kharkov. Khronika Pevolyutsii (2005), Foto estafeta. Ot Rodchenko do nashikh dney (2006)Le portrait dans l'art contemporain (2010), Nude Art Today (third edition; 2012), Eyemazing: The New Collectible Art Photography (2013), and Post-Photography: The Artist with a Camera (2014).

== Publications ==
- Scheme. Zine collection. Paris: Editions Bessard. 2012. ISBN 979-1-09-140600-0.
