= Night Over Chile =

1977 film

- Film poster
- Directed by: Sebastián Alarcón; Aleksandr Kosarev
- Written by: Sebastián Alarcón; Sergei Mukhin
- Starring: Grigore Grigoriu; Olegar Fedoro; Nartai Begalin
- Cinematography: Vyacheslav Syomin
- Release date: July 1977
- Running time: 111 minutes
- Country: Soviet Union
- Language: Russian

Night Over Chile (Russian: Ночь над Чили, romanized: Noch nad Chili) is a 1977 Soviet drama film directed by Sebastián Alarcón and Aleksandr Kosarev. It was entered into the 10th Moscow International Film Festival where it won the Special Prize.

== Plot ==
Young architect Manuel's (Grigore Grigoriu) life purpose is to construct new beautiful houses. He is not interested in politics, showing everyone around him complete neutrality. However the events of 11 September 1973 shatter his perfect little world. The murder of lawful President Allende, arrests without charges and court decisions fundamentally change Manuel's outlook on what is happening. Because a leftist activist escaped from a raid through his apartment, the architect gets thrown into jail, goes through torture and abuse, and witnesses mass executions (at the infamous National Stadium). Manuel understands that the only way for an honest man is the path of the political struggle, the national resistance.

== Cast ==
- Grigore Grigoriu as Salvador
- Nartai Begalin as Chilean soldier
- Olegar Fedoro as Crime Reporter (as Oleg Fedorov)
- Baadur Tsuladze as Senator
- Sebastián Alarcón as Sergeant
