= Silent Love =

Silent Love may refer to:

- Silent Love (1977 film), a Dutch drama film
- Silent Love (2024 film), a Japanese romantic drama film starring Ryosuke Yamada
- Silent Love (1971 film), a Shaw Brothers film
- Silent Love (1986 film), a Hong Kong film produced by Sammo Hung
- A Silent Love, a 2004 Canadian film by Federico Hidalgo
- Pyar Hua Chori Chori (lit. 'Love Happened Silently'), a 1991 Indian Hindi-language film
