= Pessi =

Pessi is a surname. Notable people with the surname include:

- Benjamín Rojas Pessi (born 1985), Argentine actor and singer
- Giorgio Pessi (1891–1933), Italian World War I ace pilot
- Ville Pessi (1902–1983), Finnish politician

== See also ==
- Pessi and Illusia, a 1984 Finnish fantasy film
