= 10th Moscow International Film Festival =

Film festival

- Location: Moscow, Soviet Union
- Founded: 1959
- Awards: Grand Prix
- Festival date: 7–21 July 1977
- Website: http://www.moscowfilmfestival.ru

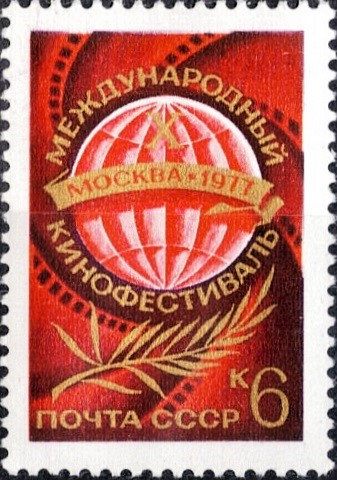
USSR postage stamp advertising the 10th Moscow International Film Festival

The 10th Moscow International Film Festival was held 7–21 July 1977. The Golden Prizes were awarded to the Hungarian film The Fifth Seal directed by Zoltán Fábri, the Spanish film El puente directed by Juan Antonio Bardem and the Soviet film Mimino directed by Georgiy Daneliya.

== Jury ==
- Stanislav Rostotsky (USSR - President of the Jury)
- Salah Abu Seif (Egypt)
- Barbara Brylska (Poland)
- Souna Boubakar (Niger)
- Valerio Zurlini (Italy)
- Michael Kutza (USA)
- Toshiro Mifune (Japan)
- Vladimir Naumov (USSR)
- István Nemeskürty (Hungary)
- Yuri Ozerov (USSR)
- Ion Popescu-Gopo (Romania)
- Humberto Solás (Cuba)
- René Thévenet (France)
- Basu Chatterjee (India)
- Suimenkul Chokmorov (USSR)
- Milutin Colic (Yugoslavia)

== Films in competition ==
The following films were selected for the main competition:

English title	Original title	Director(s)	Production country
The August Star	Sao thang tam	Tran Dac	Vietnam
The Swimming Pool	Baseynat	Binka Zhelyazkova	Bulgaria
Logan's Run	Logan's Run	Michael Anderson	United States
Mina, Wind of Freedom	Mina, viento de libertad	Antonio Eceiza	Mexico
The Angel of Vengeance – The Female Hamlet	İntikam Meleği – Kadın Hamlet	Metin Erksan	Turkey
Heroes Are Born Twice	Al-abtal yooladoon marratayn	Salah Dehny	Syria
The Head	Al-ras	Faisal Al-Yassiri	Iraq
The Late Blossom	Le soleil se lève en retard	André Brassard	Canada
Idealist	Idealist	Igor Pretnar	Yugoslavia
Antti the Treebranch	Antti Puuhaara	Katariina Lahti, Heikki Partanen, Riitta Rautoma	Finland
The Moving Picture Man	El cine soy yo	Luis Armando Roche	Venezuela
Foul Play	El puente	Juan Antonio Bardem	Spain
Mrigayaa	Mrigayaa	Mrinal Sen	India
Mimino	Mimino	Georgiy Daneliya	Soviet Union
Silent Love	Een stille liefde	René van Nie	Netherlands
An Unforgettable Autumn	An Unforgettable Autumn	Khaltariin Damdin	Mongolia
The Incorrigible Barbara	Die unverbesserliche Barbara	Lothar Warneke	East Germany
Night Over Chile	Noch nad Chili	Sebastián Alarcón, Aleksandr Kosarev	Soviet Union
The Life of Chikuzan	Chikuzan hitori tabi	Kaneto Shindo	Japan
Omar Gatlato	Omar Gatlato	Merzak Allouache	Algeria
San Babila-8 P.M.	San Babila ore 20 un delitto inutile	Carlo Lizzani	Italy
The Doom	Osinda	Sergiu Nicolaescu	Romania
The Fifth Seal	Az otodik pecset	Zoltán Fábri	Hungary
Río Negro	Río Negro	Manuel Pérez	Cuba
Ceddo	Ceddo	Ousmane Sembene	Senegal
Sonya and the Madman	سونيا والمجنون Sonya Wa Elmagnon	Houssam El-Din Mustafa	Egypt
To Save the City	Ocalić miasto	Jan Łomnicki	Poland, Soviet Union
Evening Land	Aftenlandet	Peter Watkins	Denmark
Crazy Women	Las locas	Enrique Carreras	Argentina
Kuntur Wachana	Kuntur Wachana	Federico García Hurtado	Peru
Shadow of the Castles	L'ombre des châteaux	Daniel Duval	France
Do Be Quick	Běž, ať ti neuteče	Stanislav Strnad	Czechoslovakia
Dead End	Bon Bast	Parviz Sayyad	Iran
The Sternstein Manor	Sternsteinhof	Hans W. Geißendörfer	West Germany
Elvis! Elvis!	Elvis! Elvis!	Kay Pollak	Sweden
It Shouldn't Happen to a Vet	It Shouldn't Happen to a Vet	Eric Till	Great Britain

== Awards ==
- Golden Prizes:
  - The Fifth Seal by Zoltán Fábri
  - El puente by Juan Antonio Bardem
  - Mimino by Georgiy Daneliya
- Silver Prizes:
  - Omar Gatlato by Merzak Allouache
  - The Swimming Pool by Binka Zhelyazkova
  - Shadow of the Castles by Daniel Duval
- Special Prizes:
  - Night Over Chile by Sebastián Alarcón and Aleksandr Kosarev
  - Río Negro by Manuel Pérez
- Prizes:
  - Best Actor: Radko Polič for Idealist
  - Best Actor: Amza Pellea for The Doom
  - Best Actress: Mary Apick for Dead End
  - Best Actress: Mercedes Carreras for Crazy Women
- Special Diploma: Young Actor: Lele Dorazio for Elvis! Elvis!
- Prix FIPRESCI: Kuntur Wachana by Federico García Hurtado
