= Aleksandr Kosarev =

Aleksandr Kosarev may refer to:

- Aleksandr Kosarev (volleyball)
- Aleksandr Kosarev (politician)
- Aleksandr Kosarev (director)
