= Jury Rupin =

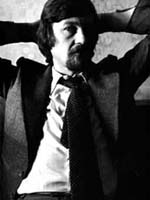
- Born: October 1, 1946; Krasnyi Lyman, USSR (now Lyman, Ukraine)
- Died: October 22, 2008 (aged 62); Vilnius, Lithuania
- Occupations: Photographer, art expert and collector, writer.
- Website: www.rupin.com

Jury Rupin (October 1, 1946, Krasnyi Lyman, USSR (now Lyman, Ukraine) – October 22, 2008, Vilnius, Lithuania) was a photographer, artist, writer.

== Biography ==
=== Early life and education ===
Born on October 1, 1946, in Krasnyi Lyman, USSR (now Lyman, Ukraine). He got his first camera in 1958, started doing photography straight after. From 1961 to 1965 he studied in Slavyanskiy technical college. He served in the Soviet army from 1965 to 1968 (Tbilisi, Yerevan). From 1969 to 1974 he studied in Kharkov Polytechnical Institute. from 1979 to 1985 he studied in Saint Petersburg at the Imperial Academy of Arts.

=== Career ===
In 1974–1976 Jury co-founded a famous art group "Vremya group" ("Time") in Kharkiv. From 1971 to 1985 he worked as a correspondent for "TASS", "Evening Kharkiv", "Red Flag", Kharkiv advertising combine. In 1990 until 1993, together with Aleksandr Maziuk, he opened the first private gallery in the USSR (Tallinn, Estonia). From 1994 to 2001 he was managing director of the "Rupincom" stock photo agency.

He died in Vilnius, Lithuania at aged 62.

== Recent exhibitions and publications ==
- Illustration for "How to think like a Russian" by Nobel laureate Svetlana Alexievich in the Telegraph, London 2016
- "Borderline. Ukrainian Art 1985–2004", PinchukArtCentre, Kyiv 30 May 2015 – 4 October 2015
- Photography Day at London Art Fair 2009
- HotShoe International (February – March 2009 issue) – Front Cover
- EYEMAZING Magazine (Issue 02 2009) – Article, including 6 photos

== Past Exhibitions (1974–1976) ==
In a very short 2-year period Jury's work has been successfully exhibited all around the world. Many works have collected exhibition awards. In 1976 the KGB has completely sealed any channels of sending Jury's photos abroad after a nude photo was discovered by a KGB agent in a package of photos sent for an exhibition.

Australia

- Interphot 76 (Norwood South)

Angola

- Grupo Desportivo e Curtural Da Sesil Do Ultramar (Luanda)

Argentina

- Foto Club Buenos Aires (Buenos Aires)
- Foto Club Argentino (Buenos Aires)
- SalonInternational De Art Fotografico (Buenos Aires)

Belgium

- 2nd world festival of photographic arts
- Fotoclub Virton
- Virton-76

Brazil

- Sosiedade Fluminense de Fotografia

Czechoslovakia

- III INFOTA 1974 (Jičín)
- IV INFOTA 1976, (Jičín)
- Fotoforum Ruzomberok
- Fotografia Academica
- Vitkovice-74 (Ostrava)

Denmark

- Den XIX (Havdrup)
- The Society of Photographic Art (Havdrup)

France

- 4-e Salon de Photographies (Nîmes)
- 5eme Salon International D'art Photographique 1976 (Nîmes)
- Bordeaux
- Cine Flach Club, Vincennes
- Coupe charles phate
- F.N.S.P.F, Paris
- Macon
- Mautes la Zolie
- Photo9club ARTEK Moucron, Hersea
- Salon International photographique (Bordeaux)

GDR

- 6 Bifota (Berlin)

Germany

- FotoFilmeclub (Kapellen)
- "Photokona" (Köln)
- International Neusser fotowochen

Holland

- Fotomundi

India

- PSMP, International Salon ( Bhopal)

Italy

- Gruppo Fotografico Toro (Torino)

Japan

- Asahy Shimbun (Tokyo)

Poland

- Małe formaty 74
- V Salon Portretu Artystycznego
- Venus-74 (Kraków)
- Venus-75 (Kraków)

Portugal

- Repartição de Cltura e Turismo (Porto)

Spain

- Europa75 bienale de fotografia
- Fotosport76 (Reus)
- Sociedad Fotográfica Zaragoza

Sri Lanka

- The Exhibition Photographic Society of Sri Lanka

Switzerland

- Photo Club Aigle (Aigle)
- Photo Club St-Gallem

Romania

- Asociatia artiştilor fotografi (București)

United Kingdom

- Edinburgh Photographic Society
- International Exhibition of Pictorial Photography

USA

- 18th Wichita International Salon of Photography
- Bristol Salon of Photography
- Mississippi Valley (St. Louise)
- Northwest International (Washington)
- Wichita international exhibition of photography

Yugoslavia

- Foto klub Natron (Maglai)
- Sterijino Pozorje (Novi Sad)

== The "Vremya group" ("Time"), Kharkiv ==
Jury Rupin is the founder of an art group "Vremya group" – well known both in Ukraine and the USSR (1974–1976). The group has consisted of such photographers as Eugeny Pavlov, Oleg Malevanny, Aleksandr Suprun, Gennady Tubalev, Boris Mikhailov, Aleksandr Sitnichenko and later – Anatoly Makienko.

Vremya group (Kharkiv) exhibited at Student palace, Kharkiv, USSR, 1987, and "Сarte blanche a Boris Mikhailov" in Cite Internationale des Arts, Paris (September – October) 1999,
