= Yrjö Kokko =

Finnish writer and veterinarian (1903–1977)

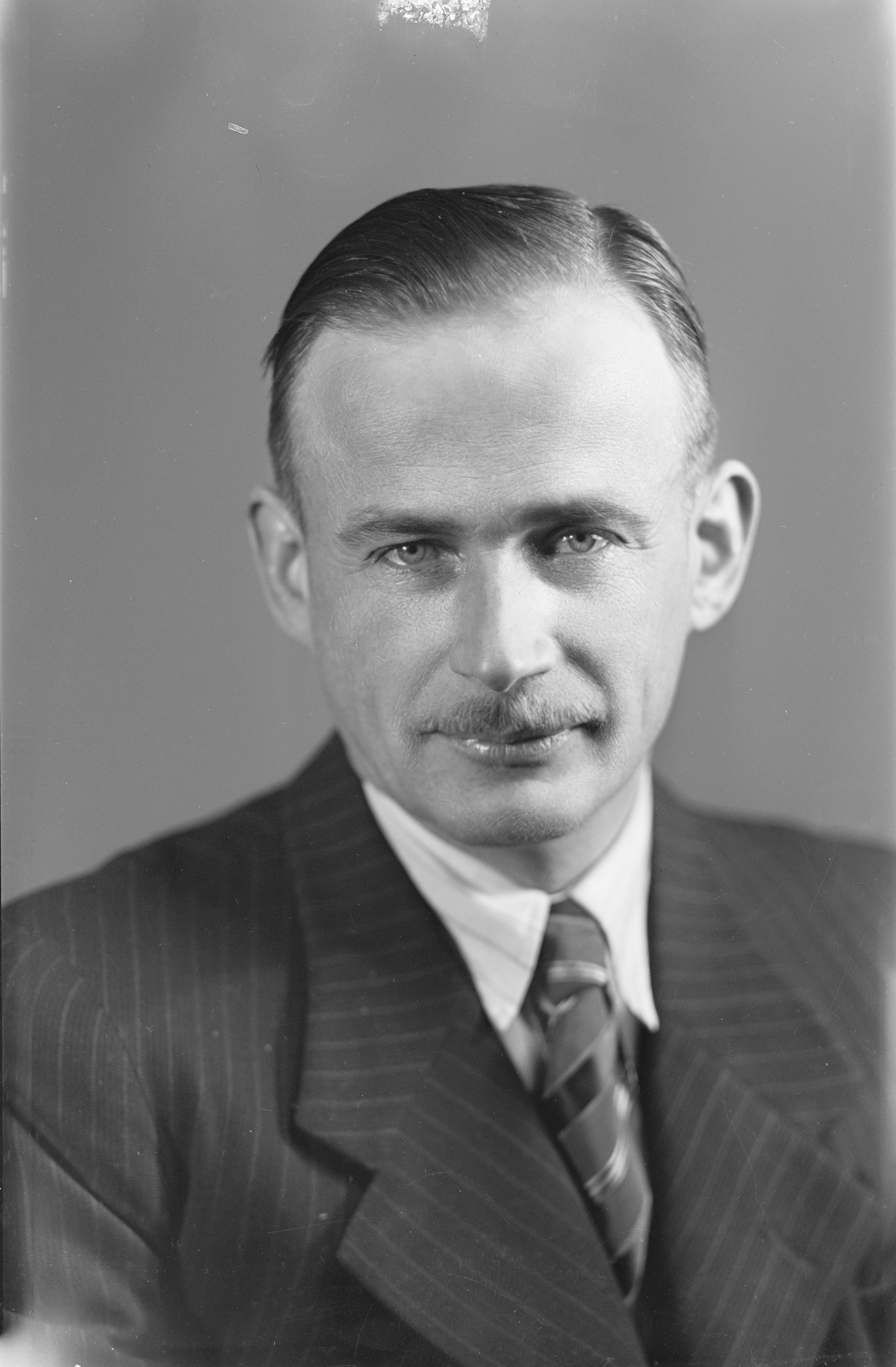
- Kokko in 1941
- Born: Yrjö Olavi Samuli Kokko; 16 October 1903; Sortavala, Grand Duchy of Finland, Russian Empire
- Died: 6 September 1977 (aged 73); Helsinki, Finland
- Education: University of Veterinary Medicine Vienna
- Occupation: Writer
- Writing career
- Language: Finnish, German
- Notable works: Pessi and Illusia
- Notable awards: Pro Finlandia

Yrjö Olavi Samuli Kokko (16 October 1903 in Sortavala – 6 September 1977 in Helsinki) was a Finnish writer and veterinarian. He wrote more than 20 books, among them Pessi and Illusia (Pessi ja Illusia, 1944), Singing Swan of fate Bird (Laulujoutsen, 1954), The Way of the Four Winds (Neljän tuulen tie, 1954) and Ungelon Torppa (1958).

Yrjö Kokko wrote his first book during the heroic Finnish-Russian Winter War, where he volunteered. It is during that time on the war front that he wrote his most famous work Pessi and Illusia. Kokko was a specialist of wild life, namely birds. He made countless expeditions in Lapland, living among the Lappish people or Sámi, which he knew like few others at that time. His advocacy for Lappish people was more a cultural than a political one. Kokko was unfavorable of fast developing mass-tourism in Lappland.

Ungelon Torppa, the house Kokko built in Enontekiö, stands to this date as testimony of his life, works and heritage.

Pessi and Illusia has been translated in more than 10 languages including Japanese and is periodically reprinted. The story has inspired a ballet composed by Ahti Sonninen and numerous play and film versions, among them a 1984 film by Heikki Partanen. Pessi and Illusia and Singing Swan of fate Bird have been best-sellers in Finland for several years.

Yrjö Kokko is credited for saving the whooper swan from extinction. He was awarded with Pro Finlandia medal in 1956.

The Yrjö Kokko Seura association in Enontekiö (Finnish Lapland) is a tribute to his life and accomplishments.

== Bibliography ==
- Kotieläin (Otava 1932)
- Pitäkää Tulta Vireillä (WSOY 1941)
- Pessi and Illusia (WSOY 1944)
- The Way of the Four Winds (WSOY 1948)
- Singing Swan of fate Bird (WSOY 1950)
- Sudenhampainen kaulanauha (WSOY 1951)
- Hyvän tahdon saaret: matkakuvaus (WSOY 1953)
- Ne tulevat takaisin (WSOY 1954)
- Ungelon Torppa (WSOY 1958)
- Tunturi (WSOY 1961)
- Täydennysmies (WSOY 1962)
- Perheen Jumppakirja (WSOY 1962)
- Sota ja satu (WSOY 1964)
- Molli: Maailman viisain koira (WSOY 1965)
- Alli, jäänreunan lintu (WSOY 1966)
- Poro: Muistelus (WSOY 1969)
- Parhaat Ystäväni (WSOY 1970)
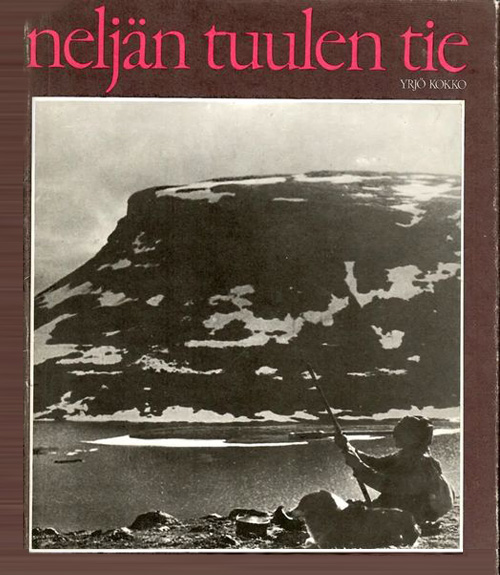
Neljän Tuulen Tie, The Way of the Four Winds (1954)

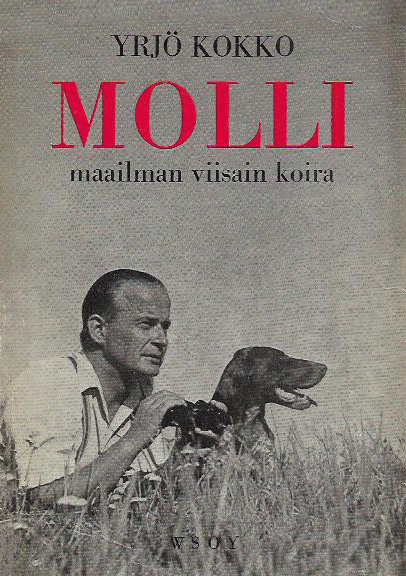
Yrjö Kokko: Molli (1965)
