= Katariina Lahti =

Finnish film director

- Born: 13 October 1949 (age 76); Savonlinna, Finland
- Occupations: Film director, screenwriter
- Years active: 1976-1986

Katariina Lahti (born 13 October 1949) is a Finnish film director and screenwriter. She directed eight films between 1976 and 1986. Her 1976 film Antti the Treebranch was entered into the 10th Moscow International Film Festival.

== Selected filmography ==
- Antti the Treebranch (1976)
