= Antti the Treebranch =

1976 film

- Directed by: Katariina Lahti; Heikki Partanen; Riitta Rautoma
- Written by: Erkki Mäkinen; Katariina Lahti; Heikki Partanen; Riitta Rautoma
- Produced by: Heikki Partanen; Riitta Rautoma
- Starring: Markku Blomqvist
- Cinematography: Markku Lehmuskallio
- Music by: Kari Rydman; Martti Pokela
- Release date: 5 November 1976
- Running time: 107 minutes
- Country: Finland
- Language: Finnish

Antti the Treebranch (Finnish: Antti Puuhaara) is a 1976 Finnish drama film directed by Katariina Lahti, Heikki Partanen and Riitta Rautoma. It was entered into the 10th Moscow International Film Festival.

== Cast ==
- Markku Blomqvist as Markki Bohattov
- Pertti Hilkamo as Antti Puuhaara
- Maritta Viitamäki as Darja Bohattov
- Eero Melasniemi as Arto Mustahattu
- Matti Ruohola as Tragedian
- Matti Pellonpää as Comedian
- Margit Lindeman as Savina Iivena
- Asko Koukkari as Vilpas
- Eila Rinne as Louhi
- Mariaana Fieandt as Tuonentytti
- Leo Pentti as Hunter
- Arvi Moilanen as Teppana Partanen
