= Sebastián Alarcón =

Chilean film director and screenwriter (1949–2019)

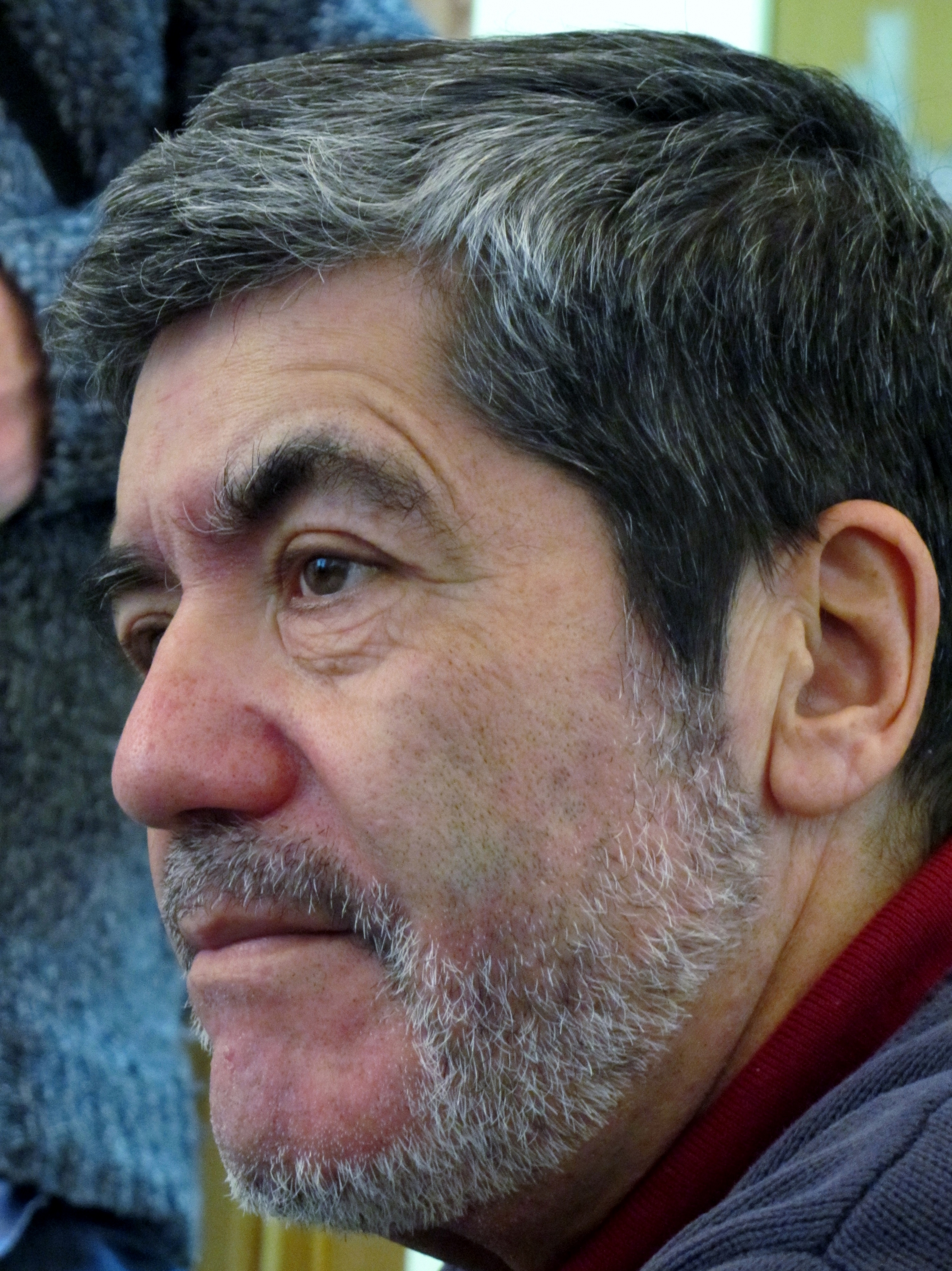
- Sebastián Alarcón at the Cervantes Institute, 2012
- Born: 14 January 1949; Valparaíso, Chile
- Died: 30 June 2019 (aged 70); Moscow, Russia
- Occupations: Film director, screenwriter
- Years active: 1985–2019

Sebastián Alarcón (14 January 1949 – 30 June 2019) was a Chilean film director and screenwriter. His 1977 film Night Over Chile won the Special Prize at the 10th Moscow International Film Festival. In 2008 he was a member of the jury at the 30th Moscow International Film Festival.

== Selected filmography ==
- La primera página (1974, short)
- Night Over Chile (1977)
- Santa Esperanza (1980)
- The Fall of the Condor (1982)
- Jaguar (1986)
- Historia de un Equipo de Billard. (1988)
- KGB Agents Also Fall in Love (1991)
- The Scar (1999)
- The Photographer (2003)
