= Elvis! Elvis! =

1977 film

- Directed by: Kay Pollak
- Written by: Maria Gripe; Kay Pollak
- Produced by: Bert Sundberg
- Starring: Lele Dorazio
- Cinematography: Mikael Salomon
- Music by: Ralph Lundsten
- Release date: July 1977 (Moscow)
- Running time: 100 minutes
- Country: Sweden
- Language: Swedish

Elvis! Elvis! is a 1977 Swedish drama film directed by Kay Pollak. It was entered into the 10th Moscow International Film Festival.

== Plot ==
Elvis Karlsson is named after his mother's idol Elvis Presley. He finds it difficult to live up to her demands and has to fight to become a human being in his own right.

== Cast ==
- Lele Dorazio as Elvis
- Lena-Pia Bernhardsson as Elvis' Mamma
- Fred Gunnarsson as Elvis' Father
- Elisaveta as Elvis' Grandmother
- Allan Edwall as Elvis' Grandfather
- Kent Andersson as Brovall
- Victoria Grant as Anna-Rosa Pettersson
- Kim Anderzon as Anna-Rosa's Mother
- Kjerstin Dellert as Anna-Rosa's Grandmother
- Svea Holst as Anna-Rosa's Great Grandmother
- Ingrid Boström as Teacher
- Lars Edström as Kurt
- Marian Gräns as Sivan
