= Foul Play (1977 film) =

1977 Spanish film by Juan Antonio Bardem

- Directed by: Juan Antonio Bardem
- Written by: Juan Antonio Bardem; Javier Palmero; Daniel Sueiro
- Produced by: Jaime Fernández-Cid
- Starring: Alfredo Landa
- Cinematography: José Luis Alcaine
- Release date: 11 March 1977
- Running time: 104 minutes
- Country: Spain
- Language: Spanish

Foul Play (Spanish: El Puente) is a 1977 Spanish drama film directed by Juan Antonio Bardem. It won the Golden Prize the 10th Moscow International Film Festival.

== Cast ==
- Alfredo Landa as Juan
- Francisco Algora as Venancio
- Victoria Abril as Lolita
- Mara Vila as Mujer que pasa frente al taller
- Miguel Ángel Aristu as Del taller #1 (as Miguel Aristu)
- Julián Navarro as Del taller #2
- Eduardo Bea as Del taller #3
- José Yepes as Del taller #4
- Antonio Gonzalo as Del taller #5
- Rafael Vaquero as Del taller #6
- Jesús Enguita as Del 600 averiado #1
- Concha Leza as Del 600 averiado #2 (as Conchita de Leza)
- Antonio Orengo as Del 600 averiado #3
