= Jaguar (1986 film) =

- Russian: Ягуар
- Directed by: Sebastián Alarcón
- Written by: Sebastián Alarcón; Mario Vargas Llosa; Tatyana Yakovleva
- Starring: Sergey Veksler; Artyom Kaminsky; Adel Al-Khadad; Sergey Gazarov; Yanina Khachaturova; Igor Vernik
- Cinematography: Anatoliy Ivanov
- Music by: Sebastián Alarcón; Viktor Babushkin
- Production company: Mosfilm
- Release date: November 10, 1986
- Running time: 90 min.
- Country: Soviet Union
- Language: Russian

Jaguar (Russian: Ягуар) is a 1986 Soviet drama film directed by Sebastián Alarcón. It is an adaptation of Mario Vargas Llosa's novel The Time of the Hero.

The hero is a cadet of a military school where future defenders of the Pinochet regime are trained. Having survived the collapse of the philosophy of cruelty, Jaguar (as the cadets called him for his firm and independent character) joins the ranks of fighters against the existing regime.

== Plot ==
Set in Chile during the early 1980s under Augusto Pinochet’s rule, the film follows three cadets in a military academy, each occupying a distinct social rank within the informal hierarchy among students. Pablo, nicknamed “Jaguar,” hails from humble origins and joins the army to climb the social ladder; he’s a strong leader who was the only cadet not subjected to the academy’s humiliating initiation rituals. Alberto Fernandez, known as “Poet,” holds a middling position, while Ricardo Orana, dubbed “Slave,” is the group’s outcast, enduring mockery and bullying from his peers. When cadet Cave draws the assignment to break into a classroom to steal exam answers, he accidentally shatters a window, alerting Orana, who is on guard duty in Jaguar's place. Although Orana witnesses the incident, the academy command blames all guards for the breach, stripping them of leave privileges. Upset by this punishment, especially since he recently met a girl, Orana informs on Cave, leading to his expulsion.

Later, the cadets are sent to break up an anti-government protest, where Orana is killed by gunfire. An investigation reveals that he was shot by a fellow cadet, but the academy chooses to cover it up, blaming the protesters instead. Fernandez, Orana’s friend, accuses Jaguar of being responsible and informs the command about ongoing corruption among the cadets, including illicit drinking, cigarette sales, and trading exam answers. Lieutenant Gamboa, who supports finding the truth, backs Fernandez’s claims, leading to Jaguar and Fernandez’s detention and a barracks search that uncovers forbidden items. Pressured by the academy’s need to maintain its official version of Orana’s death, Fernandez is coerced into retracting his accusations. While in detention, Fernandez confesses to Jaguar that he implicated him, sparking a fight between them until Lieutenant Gamboa intervenes. Upon their return to the barracks, Jaguar faces hostility from his peers, who suspect him of betraying them. Although he knows Fernandez was responsible, Jaguar remains silent. Disillusioned, Gamboa is reassigned, but before leaving, he speaks with Jaguar, who expresses his disappointment with his comrades and questions his past loyalties. Ultimately, feeling betrayed and disillusioned with his military path, Jaguar leaves the academy to join the guerrillas in the mountains.

== Cast ==
- Sergey Veksler as Pablo the Jaguar
- Artyom Kaminsky as Alberto Fernandez
- Adel Al-Khadad as Ricardo Orana
- Sergey Gazarov as Lieutenant Gamboa
- Yanina Khachaturova as Teresa
- Igor Vernik as Cava
- Vladimir Tatosov as colonel
- Vsevolod Shilovsky as major
- Islam Kaziyev as Sergeant Pesoa
- Bakhram Akramov as Pitaluga
- Sergey Shkalikov as Boa
