= Pessi and Illusia =

1984 film

- Original Finnish film poster
- Directed by: Heikki Partanen
- Written by: Erkki Mäkinen; Riitta Rautoma; Jorma Kairimo; Heikki Partanen
- Based on: Pessi and Illusia by Yrjö Kokko
- Starring: Sami Kangas; Annu Marttila
- Cinematography: Henrik Paersch
- Edited by: Riitta Rautoma
- Music by: Kari Rydman; Antti Hytti
- Distributed by: Finnkino Oy
- Release date: 6 January 1984
- Running time: 77 minutes
- Country: Finland
- Language: Finnish
- Budget: FIM 3,765,874

Pessi and Illusia (Finnish: Pessi ja Illusia) is a 1984 Finnish fantasy film directed by Heikki Partanen. The tale about the friendship between a goblin boy Pessi and a fairy girl Illusia is based on the 1944 book by Yrjö Kokko.

The film was selected as the Finnish entry for the Best Foreign Language Film at the 57th Academy Awards, but was not accepted as a nominee.

== Cast ==
- Eija Ahvo as Hiiriäiti
- Riitta-Anneli Forss as Viihdytystaiteilija
- Raimo Grönberg as Isä
- Minka-Maija Halko as Ristilukin tyttö
- Sami Kangas as Pessi
- Rauno Ketonen as Isä Illusioni (voice)
- Pentti Lahti as Viihdytyskiertueen saksofonisti
- Katerina Lojdová as Kapteenin vaimo
- Annu Marttila as Illusia
- Pauli Pöllänen as Lumikko Martes

== See also ==
- List of submissions to the 57th Academy Awards for Best Foreign Language Film
- List of Finnish submissions for the Academy Award for Best Foreign Language Film
