= Aleksandr Kosarev (director) =

Alexander Kosarev
- Born: Alexander Borisovich Kosarev
- Occupations: director; screenwriter; actor; songwriter
- Years active: 1970 – 1993

Alexander Borisovich Kosarev (March 15, 1944 – January 19, 2013) was a Soviet-Russian film director, writer, actor, poet and lyricist.

== Biography ==
Kosarev was born on March 15, 1944, in Moscow. His father, Boris Kosarev, was a famous Soviet photographer, and the official photographer of the Government of the USSR.

In 1965 he graduated from the acting department of Schepkin Theater School (combined course GITIS and VTU – teachers V. I. Tsygankov and L. A. Volkov).

He studied on the same course with Inna Churikova and Tamara Degtyaryova and auditioned with them at the Moscow Youth Theater, where he entered service after graduation.

Kosarev's first film practice was with People's Artist of the Soviet Union Grigory Alexandrov on the set of the film "Starling and Lyra". In 1973, he graduated from the directing department VGIKa (workshop of Igor Talankin). Alexander Kosarev's graduation film One Hundred Steps in the Clouds amazed Sergey Bondarchuk, who happened to be in the studio to re-record the music for the film: "Before I knew, only one film about the working class -" Height "Zarkhi… Today I saw the second film." Bondarchuk brought a talented debutant to the 1st creative association "Mosfilma" to the director N. T. Sizov with the words: "Here is a man who will make a big movie".

After graduating from VGIK, Alexander Kosarev continued to make more films, attaching great importance to scripts and being a co-author of many of them. Kosarev appreciated the professionalism in his work. He almost always worked with the same film crew of cameramen, lighting, and make-up artists.

Several actors starred with Alexander Kosarev in several films, including Peter Velyaminov, Ivan Lapikov, Roman Filippov, Daniil Netrebin, Mikhail Gluzsky, and Irina Korotkova.

The director attached great importance to the music that sounded in his films. Alexander Kosarev has worked with such composers as Alexey Rybnikov, Igor Krutoy, and Yuri Antonov. Several films featured songs written to the verses of Alexander Kosarev.

In 1997, Alexander Kosarev suffered a stroke, after which he could no longer return to the profession. The director died on January 19, 2013. He was buried in Moscow at Danilovskoye cemetery.

== Family ==
- Father – Boris Maksimovich Kosarev, (1911–1989) – photographer, photojournalist.
- Mother – Nina Pavlovna Kosareva, (1916–2012) – teacher of biology and chemistry.
- Wife – Irina Yuryevna Korotkova, (born August 25, 1947) – actress.
- Daughter – Maria Alexandrovna Kosareva

== Creativity ==
=== Filmography ===
==== Directing work ====
1. 1971 — Staircase (short)
2. 1973 — One Hundred Steps in the Clouds – thesis (short)
3. 1974 — My "Zhigulyonok" (short)
4. 1975 — When the Earth Shakes
5. 1977 — Night over Chile
6. 1980 — I wish you success
7. 1982 — Urgent… Secret… Gubchek (and lyricist)
8. 1984 — Before parting (and lyricist)
9. 1989 — Souvenir for the prosecutor (and songwriter)
10. 1991 — Predators (and songwriter)
11. 1993 — Hostages of The Devil

==== Movie roles ====
1. 1970 — Two in December (short) – He
2. 1973 — Origins – episode (uncredited)
3. 1989 — Souvenir for the prosecutor – Fadey Fadeyevich
4. 1991 — Predators – Guy, director of the reserve
5. 1993 — Hostages of the "Devil" – investigator Chikurov

==== Scenarios ====
1. 1984 — Before parting
2. 1989 — Souvenir for the prosecutor
3. 1991 — Predators
4. 1993 — Hostages of The Devil

=== Poetry ===
Songs in collaboration

- with Yuri Antonov (performed by him):
  - "About You and Me" (in the movie "Before We Part")
  - "Intoxicated Lilac" (in the film "Predators")
  - "Somewhere…" (in the film "Before We Part")
  - "The long-awaited plane" (in the film "Before We Part")
  - "Eccentric in love", performed by Ekaterina Semenova from the movie "Predators".
- with Igor Krutoy for the film "A souvenir for the prosecutor":
  - "Day of Love" (for the first time sounded in the film, performed by Igor Talkov)
  - "Four Brothers" (for the first time sounded in the film, performed by the singer Larisa Dolina)
  - "A moment of luck" (for the first time sounded in the film, performed by the singer Alexandra Serov)
  - "How to be" / "Maybe not to rush the night and repeat everything from the beginning" (sounded for the first time in the film, performed by Aleksandr_Kosarev singer Alexandra Serov)

=== Plays ===
- "Jolly Cake" (Moscow Puppet Theatre)
- Geese-Swans (Moscow Puppet Theatre)

=== Short films ===
==== "Ladder" (1971) ====
The short film 1971, academic work at VGIK. Plot: A simple comeback story.

Cast:

- Anatoly Bystrov
- Maria Zorina

Film crew:

- Director's work – Alexander Kosarev (Chair of Film Directing, workshop of Igor Talankin, teachers Emilia Kirillovna Kravchenko, V.T. Romanova)
- Camera work – Boris Kustov (department of cameramanship, workshop of L.V. Kosmatova, master-director V.A. Ginzburg)
- Film director – T. Austriavskaya

==== "One Hundred Steps in the Clouds" (1973) ====
The short film of 1973, diploma work at VGIK.

Plot: After demobilization, Vasily and his friends arrive at the shock construction site of a hydroelectric power station, the crooked Sanka Prokhorov is in charge of a team of high-rise assemblers. Vasily comes into conflict with him.

Cast:

- Mikhail Gluzsky – foreman, Mitroshin
- Boris Rudnev – Vasily
- German Kachin — foreman, Senka Prokhorov
- Irina Korotkova — girl operator
- Alexander Lebedev — worker

Film crew:

- Director — Alexander Kosarev
- Screenwriter — Anatoly Bezuglov
- Director of photography – Igor Bogdanov
- ArtistNickname — Vasily Golikov
- Composer — Alexey Rybnikov
- The song in the film is performed by Valentina Nikulina to lyrics by A. Alshutov

==== "My Zhiguli" (1974) ====
A satirical film about what can happen to a car enthusiast if he turns to the private services of "masters" and all kinds of lovers to earn extra money. The film was shot by order of the UGAI of the Ministry of Internal Affairs of the USSR.

Cast:

- Georgy Vitsin — Uncle Zhenya
- Galina Mikeladze — client

In episodes (uncredited):

- Anatoly Obukhov — uncle Zhenya's partner
- Boris Rudnev – GAI officer

Film crew:

- Director — Alexander Kosarev
- Screenwriter — Tikhon Nepomniachtchi
- Operator – V. Masevich
- Artist – Vasily Golikov

On the glass of Uncle Zhenya's truck are photographs Yury Nikulin – in the role of Stooge (magazine clipping) and a photo postcard "Actors of Soviet cinema", which in Soviet times were sold in kiosks "Soyuzpechat".

== Awards ==
- Honored Art Worker of the Dagestan ASSR (1976) – for the film "When the earth trembles" (1975)
- Special Prize Moscow International Film Festival for the film "Night over Chile" (1977)
