= Bondarchuk =

Bondarchuk (Ukrainian: Бондарчук) is a Ukrainian patronymic surname literally meaning "son of barrel maker". Notable people with the surname include:

- Sergei Bondarchuk (1920–1994), actor and film director
- Irina Bondarchuk, née Skobtseva (1927–2020), actress; widow of Sergei Bondarchuk
- Anatoliy Bondarchuk (1940–2025), Ukrainian hammer thrower
- Natalya Bondarchuk (born 1950), actress and film director, daughter of Sergei Bondarchuk and Inna Makarova
- Irina Bondarchuk (born 1952), Soviet-Russian long-distance runner
- Yelena Bondarchuk (1962–2009), actress, daughter of actors Sergei Bondarchuk and Irina Skobtseva
- Fyodor Bondarchuk (born 1967), actor and film director, son of Sergei Bondarchuk and Irina Skobtseva
- Daryna Bondarchuk (born 1998), Ukrainian footballer
