= Silent Love (1977 film) =

1977 film

- Directed by: René van Nie
- Written by: René van Nie
- Produced by: Vincent van den Vliet
- Starring: Walter van Canoy
- Release date: July 1977
- Running time: 102 minutes
- Country: Netherlands
- Language: Dutch

Silent Love (Dutch: Een stille liefde) is a 1977 Dutch drama film written and directed by René van Nie. It was entered into the 10th Moscow International Film Festival.

== Cast ==
- Walter van Canoy
- Sem de Jong as Sem van Rijn
- Romain Deconinck
- Marielle Fiolet
- Chris Lomme
- Cor van Rijn as Sem's father
- Teddy Schaank
- Dore Smit
- Mary Smithuysen
