= Igor Chekachkov =

Ukrainian photographer

- Ігор Чекачков
- Born: 1989 (age 36–37); Kharkiv, Ukrainian SSR
- Known for: Photography
- Notable work: NA4JOPM8 (2021)
- Website: chekachkov.com

Igor Chekachkov (Ukrainian: Ігор Чекачков; born 1989) is a Ukrainian photographer, based in Kharkiv. His first book is NA4JOPM8 (2021).

== Life and work ==
Chekachkov was born and raised in Kharkiv, in northeast Ukraine. His photography began in 2008, working as a photojournalist, covering cultural and social subjects in Ukraine.

He has made various personal photographic series. Daily Lives is an observation of how people interact while sharing a small, common space such as an apartment, room, or bed. Chekachkov operated as an inconspicuous observer of the daily lives of friends and lovers, who either lived with him, or who invited him into their home. Veterans, portrays an aging generation of men and women on an annual Victory Day over Nazism in World War II march in Kyiv, in which victory and peace are celebrated. The participants fought for the USSR, for Russia and for Ukraine in the Second World War. Obscure Land is a series of panoramas of Ukrainian landscapes made from train windows, digitally constructed by an in-camera algorithm. NA4JOPM8 draws from his archive of photographs that were recovered from a damaged hard disk, using some of the images that were altered, fragmented and discoloured. "Images of political protests, monuments, intimate moments of the photographer's personal life, and other assignments remix to reveal unexpected connections." Chekachkov believes such errors reflect Ukrainian reality much more precisely than a "clean" image. The book is named after the disk on which the photographs were stored.

In 2017 Chekachkov founded his own art photography school, Chekachkov Photo Academy, where he teaches.

== Publications ==
- NA4JOPM8. Kharkiv, Ukraine: IST, 2021. ISBN 978-617-7948-09-3. With an essay by Oleksandr Mykhed. Edition of 750 copies.

== Solo exhibitions ==
- Dreams of Ukraine, Ukrainian Museum, New York, 2009
