= Boris Kosarev =

Russian photographer and journalist

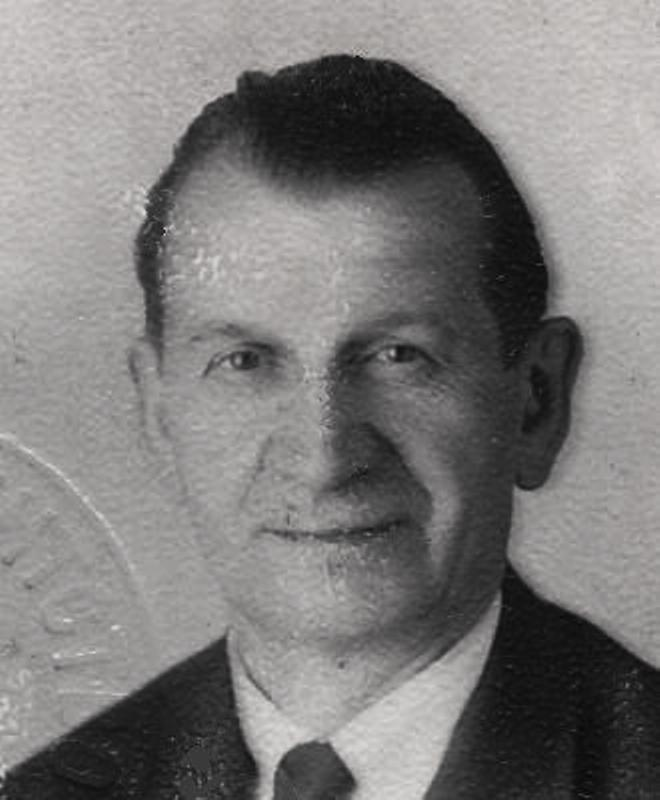
- Born: Boris Maksimovich Kosarev; 29 October 1911; Odoyev, Russian Empire
- Died: 14 November 1989 (aged 78); Moscow, Russian SFSR
- Occupations: photographer, journalist
- Website: https://www.boriskosarev.ru

Boris Maximovich Kosarev (Russian: Бори́с Макси́мович Ко́сарев; 29 October 1911–14 November 1989) was a Soviet photographer and journalist. From the 1930s to the 1960s, he served as an official photographer for the Soviet government and documented key historical events, including the Yalta Conference of 1945. Kosarev is known for capturing many iconic photographs of political events and Soviet leaders.

== Biography ==
Boris Kosarev was born on 29 October 1911 in the small town of Odoyev, Tula Governorate. At the age of 14, Boris Kosarev received a camera as a gift from his father. He began developing photographic plates, learning to work with photographic chemicals, and mastering the process of printing photographs.

From 1927 to 1929, he worked as a press operator at the Electrosvet factory while simultaneously attending photography courses at the Society of Friends of Soviet Cinema. Boris Kosarev submitted his photographs to popular newspapers and magazines, with his first works published in Vechernyaya Moskva.

In 1929, renowned Soviet writer Maxim Gorky invited Boris Kosarev to work as a photojournalist for his magazine Our Achievements, where he remained for several years. From 1929 to 1932, Kosarev's photographs were published in the Soviet magazines RABIS and Cinema and Life.

From 1932 to 1933, Kosarev worked as the official photographer for the Pribalhashstroy construction project and as a photographer for the Soyuzfoto agency. Upon his return to Moscow, Boris Kosarev worked for The Northern Route and Komsomolskaya Pravda newspapers. His photographs were also published in various other Moscow newspapers.

In 1934, Boris Kosarev joined the Soviet Army and served on the western border of the USSR in the Ukrainian SSR. He was demobilized in 1936. From 1936 to 1960, Kosarev served as the official photographer for the Council of Ministers of the Soviet Union.

In February 1945, Boris Kosarev was sent to the Crimea as a photographer to document the Yalta Conference, a meeting of the heads of government of the United States, Great Britain, and the Soviet Union. Some of his images, such as The Big Three (featuring Stalin, Roosevelt, and Churchill), were repeatedly published in various international journals. Stalin frequently requested that Kosarev portray the Soviet delegation in the most favorable light.

From 1956 to 1958, Boris Kosarev completed photojournalism courses at the Union of Journalists. In 1960, he became a member of the USSR Union of Journalists and transitioned to working as a freelance photojournalist.

Kosarev worked as a photographer at nearly all events taking place in Red Square. He created a gallery of photo portraits and genre scenes depicting the lives of Soviet leaders, including Khrushchev, Brezhnev, and Andropov.

Kosarev accompanied Soviet leaders on political visits to foreign countries, including Malenkov's visit to the UK. He photographed notable personalities such as Sholokhov, Solzhenitsyn, Rostropovich, Bondarchuk, Maya Plisetskaya, and Rockefeller (who visited the USSR for the 1954 US exhibition).

For many years, Boris Kosarev worked as a photojournalist for the Novosti Press Agency, TASS, and other outlets. In his later years, his photographs were published in journals such as Ogoniok and Soviet Photo, as well as in newspapers like Pravda. Boris had a particular interest in the theme of state borders, and many of his pictures were featured in The Border magazine.

Kosarev continued to work actively, photographing and writing novels and poems, until the end of his life. Kosarev died on 14 November 1989.

His son, Aleksander Kosarev (1944–2013), followed in his father's creative footsteps, becoming a Russian film director, Honored Art Worker of Russia, screenwriter, actor, and poet.

== Honors ==
- Medal "For the Defence of Moscow" – 1944
- Order of the Red Star – 1945
- Medal "For the Victory over Germany in the Great Patriotic War 1941–1945" – 1945
- Medal "In Commemoration of the 800th Anniversary of Moscow" – 1947
- Jubilee Medal "30 Years of the Soviet Army and Navy" – 1948
- Jubilee Medal "40 Years of the Armed Forces of the USSR" – 1957
- Medal for Battle Merit – 1949
- Order of the Red Star – 1954
- Medal "For Impeccable Service" 1st class – 1958
- Jubilee Medal "Twenty Years of Victory in the Great Patriotic War 1941–1945" – 1965
- Jubilee Medal "50 Years of the Armed Forces of the USSR" – 1967
- Jubilee Medal "In Commemoration of the 100th Anniversary of the Birth of Vladimir Ilyich Lenin" – 1970
- Honored Cultural Worker of the RSFSR

Photo works "Snowing", "Before the Storm" and "The first space flight" were internationally awarded with medals and prizes

== Exhibitions ==
- Bucharest – Szeged – 1958
- France – Nantes – 5th International saloon of photo art – 1960
- Singapore – 2nd International saloon of photography – 1960
- USA – Chicago – 1960
- Spain – Alicante – 1960
- France – Bordeaux – 1960
- Hong Kong – 1960
- United Kingdom of Great Britain – Leeds – 1960
- Spain – Barcelona – 1960
- Cuba – Havana – 1960
- Hungary – Budapest – 1961
- Australia – Melbourne – 1961
- Norway – Oslo – 1961
- Russia, Moscow – Museum of Moscow, Multimedia Art Museum, Lumiere Brothers Center for Photography – 2015
- Russia, Moscow – Museum of Moscow, Lumiere Brothers Center for Photography – 2016
- Russia, Moscow – Museum of Moscow, Moscow Manege – 2017
- Russia, Moscow – Exhibition dedicated to Russian football and World Cup 2018 – 2018

Solo exhibitions:

- Russia, Moscow – Gallery Lure Ultra Lounge – 2006
- Russia, Moscow – Museum of Moscow – 2016
- Russia, Moscow – Museum of Moscow – 2017
