= Krzysztof Candrowicz =

Polish art director

Krzysztof Candrowicz is a Polish curator, art director, researcher and educator. Since January 2014, he is the artistic director of the Triennial of Photography in Hamburg.

In the past culture manager, founder and director of multidisciplinary independent centre – Łódź Art Center (Łódź, Poland), organizer of numerous cultural and artistic events.

Co- founder and director of the International Festival of Photography in Łódź and Foundation of Visual Education.

- Initiator of Łódź candidacy to the title of European Capital of Culture 2016 (Candidacy)
- Founder of Photo Festival Union – international network of over 30 festivals of photography from Europe.
- Director of Fotofestiwal – International Festival of Photography in Łódź – one of the biggest festivals of visual art in Central Europe.
- Organizer of Łódź Design – International Festival of Design in Łódź
- Bio of Krzysztof Candrowicz – Official biography and portfolio of Krzysztof Candrowicz

In 2001 he studied in Department of Economics and Sociology at the University of Macedonia in Thessaloniki, Greece. He graduated Sociology of Art at University of Łódź. In 2003 studied in postgraduate program of Polish Academy of Sciences – Cultural Management. He was studying photography at the International Photography Forum KWADRAT in Wrocław, Poland.

On 9 February 2008 he was awarded with Łódź's Citizen of the Year title.

Krzysztof is also working as a guest curator and visiting lecturer in numerous organizations, museums, schools and festivals in Europe and worldwide. He was a member of the Jury of various art projects; e.g. Rencontres d'Arles Discovery Award (Arles, France), The Hasselblad Foundation Award, Deutsche Börse European Photography Prize, (London, United Kingdom), Historical Book Award and the Author Book Award (Arles, France), Syngenta Photography Award (Basel, Switzerland) Prix Pictet – The global award in photography and sustainability (London, United Kingdom), Robert Capa Award (Hungary).

From 2001 onwards Krzysztof Candrowicz was expert in more than one hundred portfolio reviews all over Europe as well as in the US, China, Brazil and Russia. Besides his main work, he committed himself regularly in the fields of science and politics and creative industry. He was speaker at the TEDx Warsaw and at the European Cultural Forum – FORUM D'AVIGNON, lecturer at the University of Łódź and the George Eastman House, Rochester, United States. In 2012 he was chosen for the program "40 Under 40 in Europe", that promotes top European leaders and intellectuals.
