= Ahti Sonninen =

Finnish composer

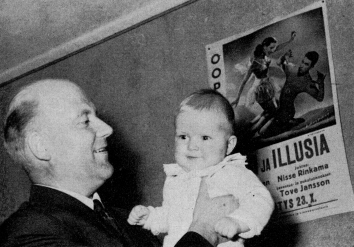
- With his youngest son in 1955
- Born: 11 July 1914; Siilinjärvi
- Died: 28 July 1984 (aged 70); Helsinki
- Occupation: Composer
- Notable work: Pessi and Illusia (ballet)

Ahti Sonninen (11 July 1914–28 July 1984) was a Finnish composer and conductor. He used both conventional tonality and the 12-tone scale.

== Biography ==
=== Early life ===
Ahti Sonninen was born on 11 July 1914 in Siilinjärvi, Northern Savonia, Finland to the teachers Albanus Sonninen and Edla Maria (Maikki). His mother's cousin, the cellist Reino Rissanen, was an important musical influence. Like his parents, Ahti Sonninen acquired the profession of a primary school teacher. He studied at the Kajaani seminary from 1931 to 1936. At the same time, Sonninen studied music theory and composition privately under the guidance of seminar director and music teacher Martti Hela. He took his first teaching position from Karttula. While living there, he could play baseball in the Siilinjärvi Effort and was also a member of the club's board. Sonninen worked as a teacher in Karttula for three years. At the same time, he continued to study music under the guidance of composer Eino Linnala in Helsinki.

=== Wartime musicology ===
Sonninen completed his military service in Käkisalmi from 1937 to 1938 and served during the Winter War and the Continuation War in Karelia. Wartime was meaningful for Sonninen's life's work. He became interested in Karelian folk poetry and began to write down the folk tunes he had heard. During the Continuation War, Sonninen worked as a teacher of the Finnish occupation in Petrozavodsk, Karelia, conducted choirs and orchestras alongside his work, and established a music institute in the city. From 1943 to 1944, he was the Music Manager of the Olonets Radio.

In 1943, at the behest of the military authorities, Sonninen accompanied maintenance transports and collected East Karelian folk music for the use of the Olonets Radio. He continued the collection of folk music after the wars in 1946–1947 as an expert in the collection trips made by the University of Helsinki's Savolainen Osakunta to Leppävirta and Pielavesi. In 1966, he recorded the singing heritage of the Sortavala area among Sortavala immigrants living in the vicinity of Jyväskylä. As a result of the collection work, the Karelian Cultural Promotion Foundation published Karelian folk songs from the Sortavala region the following year. Sonninen also recorded his home region of Siilinjärvi and Lapinlahti and, when travelling, the folk song heritage of many other Finnish localities. All in all, he recorded about 3000 folk tunes in his lifetime.

=== Composer ===
Sonninen studied at the Sibelius Academy from 1939 to 1947. The war twice interrupted his studies. His first composition concert was heard in 1946.

Sonninen's breakthrough work was 1952-completed ballet Pessi and Illusia. The ballet based on Yrjö Kokko's book was commissioned by Alfons Almi for his ballet tour. Later, the ballet was also performed by the Finnish National Opera and the Royal Opera, Stockholm. His Pessi and Illusia is the most successful Finnish ballet. It was shown about 150 times between 1952 and 1955,[2] and a television version was produced.[ 4] Sonninen has composed the ballets RuususolmuRuusunolmu (1956) and SE (1972), the daughter of the radio opera Merenkuninkaan (1949), and two other operas: the Finnish national "ritual opera" Karhunpeijainen (1968) and the maritime Haavruuva (1971).

Ahti Sonninen is one of the most prolific composers in Finland, and his production is very diverse: he has composed orchestral works, piano music, choir works, stage music, vocal series, solo songs and spiritual music. He has composed music for several films, most famously the music of the 1955 film The Unknown Soldier, directed by Edvin Laine. The film compositions brought him two Jussi awards for the films Maija finds the tune 1950 (the first Jussi statue awarded to the composer) and August 1957. Sonninen also composed the music for one foreign film: a documentary film directed by the Swedish actor Torgny Anderberg, filmed in Brazil, Jangada – Paradise on the Death River..

=== University teaching ===
From 1957 to 1977, Ahti Sonninen was a lecturer in the Sibelius Academy's school music department. He was also the Rector of the Eastern Helsinki Music Institute from 1965 to 1984. Under his leadership, the Music Institute rose to the top of the music schools and later became internationally known for its Junior Strings.

Sonninen played a significant role in the renewal of music education for children after the wars, which he developed, for example, by introducing the use of musical instruments, school orchestras, recorder playing and creating a canon for school education. He emphasized the comprehensiveness of music in teaching, combined singing and playing, and emphasized the role of folk songs in teaching. Sonninen followed the international trends of music education and brought the teaching method developed by the Hungarian composer Zoltán Kodály to Finland.

Sonninen edited many school singing books and playing collections, such as Singing and Playing, Music I–IX, We Play Together, The Basics of a Co-Playing and 123 Canons.

Ahti Sonninen founded the renowned Lapinlahti music camp in 1972,[5] which is still held annually in Lapinlahti.

The title of professor was awarded to Sonninen in 1974.

=== Influence ===
During his career, Ahti Sonninen produced many art and folk music programmes and programme series for radio and television, as well as wrote newspaper articles and gave presentations in different parts of Finland. He has influenced the creation of the following events and institutions: the Song Days of Eastern Finland, the Karelian Music Days, the Lapinlahti Days, Kuopio Music High School, the Sibelius Hall, and the Eemil Halonen Museum. Sonninen served in many positions of trust in the arts, such as the chairman of the Folk Music Society and the Finnish Singers' and Musicians' Association (SULASOL), invited member of the Hungarian Liszt Society, and honorary member of the Savo Society.

He died on 28 July 1984 in Helsinki.

== Works ==
=== Compositions ===
- Helluntaihymni, cantata for the inauguration of Vuosaari Church in 1980 ("Pentecostal anthem")
- Suurkaupungissa, series for piano 1953 ("Big City")
- Preludio for the 75th anniversary of the Festivo WSOY, 1953
- Tammenkaatajat, cantata 1953 (Oak fellers)
- El amor pasa, song series 1953
- Ballet Pessi and Illusia 1951–52
- Radio-opera Merenkuninkaan tytär ("The Daughter of the Meren King")
- Cantata Lyökämme käsi kätehen for the centenary of the Kalevala in 1949 ("We hand in hand")
- Karjalan neidon lauluja 1948
- Sinfonisia tuokioita 1947 ("Symphonic Moments")
- 3 Songs for Male Choir 1947
- Juhannusyö, song series 1946 ("Midsummer Night")
- 7 Songs of Hungarian folk poems 1946
- Laululyhde for children 1939
- Juvenalia for piano and cello

=== Works for vocal soloists ===
From the epic poem, the Kalevala:

- Lemminkäisen äiti (The mother of Lemminkäinen)
- Iso tammi (Great Oak)
- Kultaneidon taonta (The Forging of the Golden Maiden)
- Kyllikin ryöstö (The Robbery of Kylliki)
- Sammon taonta (The Forging of the Sampo)
- Tulen synty (The Birth of Fire)
- Karhun peijjaiset (Bears' Ghosts)

=== Film music ===
- Ison miehen vierailu (1999)
- Pikku suorasuu (1962)
- Lumisten metsien tyttö (1960)
- Jangada (1957)
- Elokuu (1956)
- Tuntematon sotilas (1955)
- Kun on tunteet (1954)
- Maailmat kohtaavat – XV Olympic Games in Helsinki (1952)
- Radio tekee murron (1951)
- Ratavartijan kaunis Inkeri (1950)
- Härmästä poikia kymmenen (1950)
- Maija löytää sävelen (1950)
- Kanavan laidalla (1949)
- Ruusu ja kulkuri (1948)
- Koskenkylän laulu (1947)
