= Heikki Partanen =

Finnish film director

- Occupations: Film director, screenwriter

Heikki Partanen was a Finnish film director and screenwriter. His 1976 film Antti the Treebranch was entered into the 10th Moscow International Film Festival.

== Selected filmography ==
- Antti the Treebranch (1976)
- Pessi and Illusia (1984)
