= Young Spectator's Theatre =

Type of theatre originated in the Soviet Union

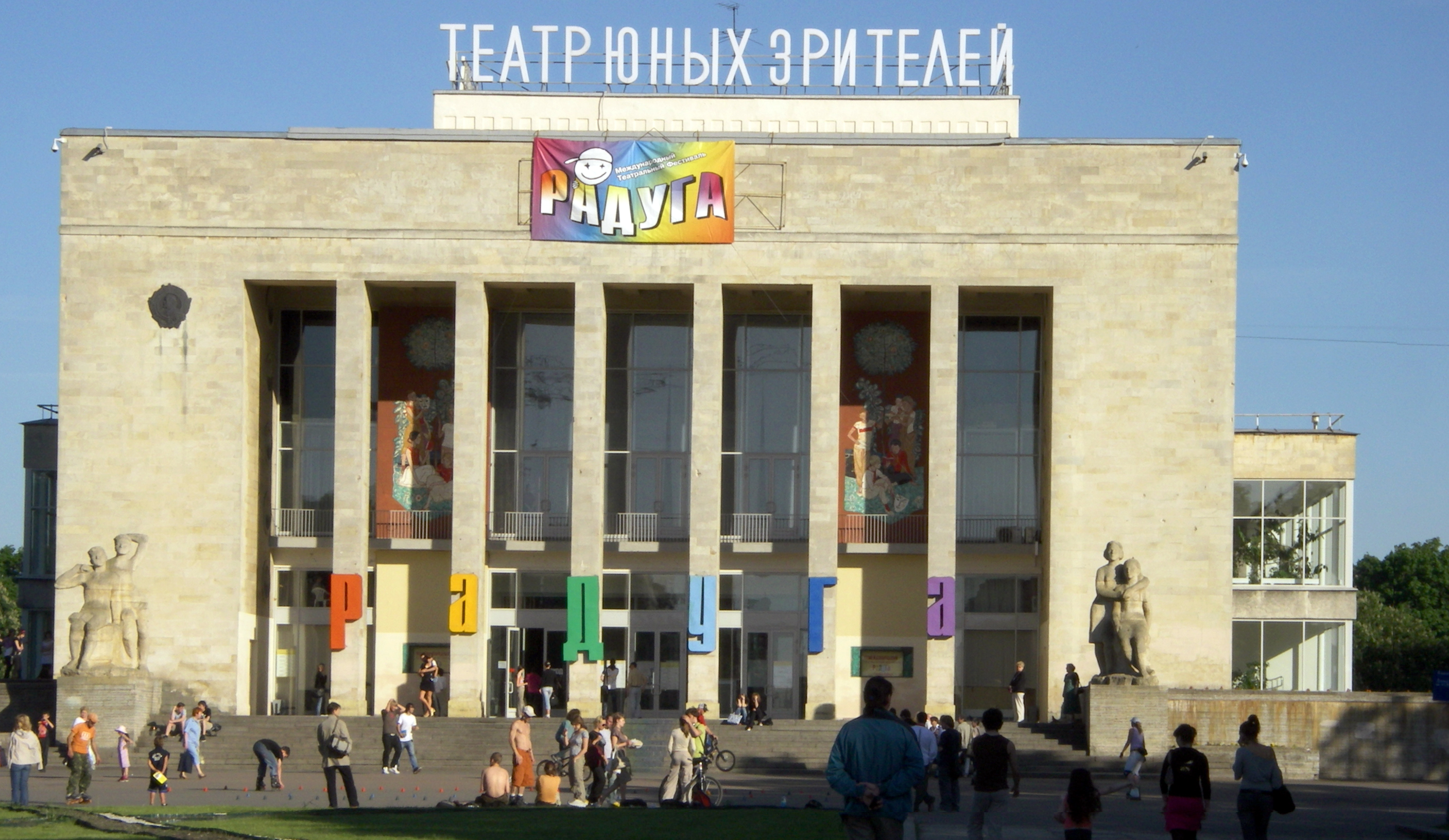
Bryantsev Youth Theatre, St.Petersburg

Young Spectator's Theatre (Театр Юного Зрителя, ТЮЗ) was a standard name of a professional theatre for children and youth in many cities of the Soviet Union, usually referred to by this abbreviation: тюз, TYuZ (sometimes translated as "TUZ theatre").

The oldest children's theatre under such a name was Moscow TYuZ (Московский театр юного зрителя) (created in 1918, but was short-lived; reestablished in 1921 as "Московский театр для детей"; now Russian Academic Youth Theatre) and Bryantsev Youth Theatre in Saint Petersburg, opened in 1922.

A TYuZ was typically a stationary theatre, with a dedicated building that housed several scenes, including a puppet theatre.

While considered by many actors to be less prestigious than "adult" theatres, such theatres served well as entertainment for youth not yet sophisticated enough for more mature theatre.

== See also ==
- Theatre for Young Audiences
