= List of Russian film directors =

The following is the list of Russian film directors.

== A ==
- Vadim Abdrashitov
- Sarik Andreasyan
- André Andrejew
- Oleg Anofriyev
- Semyon Aranovich
- Artur Aristakisyan

== B ==
- Aleksei Balabanov
- Kantemir Balagov
- Boris Barnet
- Yevgeni Bauer
- Timur Bekmambetov
- Lidia Bobrova
- Sergei Bodrov
- Sergei Bodrov, Jr.
- Andrey Bogatyrev
- Fedor Bondarchuk
- Alexander Borodyansky
- Vladimir Bortko
- Arcady Boytler
- Konstantin Bronzit
- Dimitri Buchowetzki
- Oksana Bychkova
- Yuri Bykov

== C ==
- Pyotr Chardynin
- Pavel Chukhray

== D ==
- Grigoriy Dobrygin
- Ivan Dykhovichny

== E ==
- Sergei Eisenstein
- Andrei Andreyevich Eshpai
- Nurbek Egen

== F ==
- Costa Fam
- Aleksey Fedorchenko
- Prince Michael Feodorovich of Russia
- Dmitri Alexeyevich Frolov

== G ==
- Levan Gabriadze
- Vladimir Gardin
- Sergei Gerasimov
- Marion Gering
- Aleksei Alekseivich German
- Aleksei Yuryevich German
- Valeriya Gai Germanika
- Rezo Gigineishvili
- Victor Ginzburg
- Georgi Gitis
- Alexander Goldstein
- Vasily Goncharov
- Stanislav Govorukhin
- Alexis Granowsky
- Yuli Gusman
- Alexander Gutman

== I ==
- Ikiru
- Viktor Ivanov
- Aleksandr Ivanovsky

== K ==
- Roman Abelevich Kachanov
- Roman Romanovich Kachanov
- Mikheil Kalatozishvili
- Yuri Kara
- Andrey Kavun
- Tigran Keosayan
- Rustam Khamdamov
- Nikolay Khomeriki
- Vladimir Khotinenko
- Aleksandr Khvan
- Andrei Khrzhanovsky
- Ilya Khrzhanovsky
- Dmitry Kiselyov
- Grigory Konstantinopolsky
- Viktor Kossakovsky
- Alexander Kott
- Andrei Kravchuk
- Eldar Kuliev

== L ==
- Vasily Livanov
- Konstantin Lopushansky
- Pavel Lungin
- Alexey Lushnikov
- Pavel Lyubimov

== M ==
- Alexei Makarov
- Yuri Mamin
- Vitaly Mansky
- Vladimir Mashkov
- Vladimir Maslov
- Anna Melikian
- Vladimir Menshov
- Dmitriy Meshiev
- Alexandre Michon
- Nikita Mikhalkov
- Nikolay Milovidov
- Alexander Mitta
- Léonide Moguy

== N ==
- Vladimir Naumov
- Leonid Nechayev
- Andrei Nekrasov
- Alexander Nevsky
- Angelina Nikonova
- Sergei Nolbandov

== O ==
- Ivan Okhlobystin
- Sergio Olhovich
- Nikolay Olyalin
- Fedor Ozep

== P ==
- Gleb Panfilov
- Andrei Panin
- Maksim Pezhemsky
- Gennadi Poloka
- Alyona Polunina
- Alexei Popogrebski
- Mikhail Porechenkov
- Aleksandr Porokhovshchikov
- Maxim Pozdorovkin
- Valeriy Priyomykhov
- Aleksandr Proshkin
- Yakov Protazanov
- Vsevolod Pudovkin

== R ==
- Gregory Ratoff
- Diana Ringo
- Aleksandr Rogozhkin
- Pavel Ruminov
- Sergei Ryabov
- Oleg Ryaskov

== S ==
- Aleksei Saltykov
- Samson Samsonov
- Mikhail Segal
- Nikolay Serebryakov
- Aleksandr Seryj
- Andrei Severny
- Karen Shakhnazarov
- Vasily Shukshin
- Vassily Sigarev
- Andrei Smirnov
- Alexander Sokurov
- Yuliya Solntseva
- Stanislav Solovkin
- Sergei Solovyov
- Ladislas Starevich
- Alexander Stefanovich
- Vera Storozheva
- Boris Svetlov

== T ==
- Andrei Tarkovsky
- Alexander Tatarsky
- Marianna Tavrog
- Pyotr Todorovsky
- Valery Todorovsky
- Pyotr Tochilin
- Boris Tokarev
- Victor Trivas
- George Tsisetski
- Slava Tsukerman
- Mikhail Tumanishvili
- Nikita Gennadievich Tyagunov

== U ==
- Alexei Uchitel
- Eldor Magomatovich Urazbayev
- Sergei Ursuliak

== V ==
- Mikhail Vartanov
- Ruslan Vitryanyuk
- Aleksandr Voytinskiy
- Alexandre Volkoff
- Igor Voloshin

== Y ==
- Filipp Yankovsky
- Vlad Yudin
- Yevgeny Yufit

== Z ==
- Andrej Andreevich Zolotov
- Andrey Zvyagintsev
