= Has Anyone Seen My Girl? =

- Official poster
- Directed by: Angelina Nikonova
- Written by: Angelina Nikonova
- Produced by: Sabina Yeremeyeva; Natella Krapivina; Vyacheslav Murugov; Mikhail Kuchment
- Starring: Anna Chipovskaya; Alexander Gorchilin; Viktoriya Isakova; Yuri Borisov; Yuri Chursin; Mariya Shalayeva
- Cinematography: Gorka Gomez Andreu
- Edited by: Natalia Kucherenko
- Music by: Artyom Ivanov
- Production companies: Studio Slon; Truemen Pictures
- Distributed by: Central Partnership
- Release date: February 4, 2021
- Running time: 99 minutes
- Country: Russia
- Language: Russian

Has Anyone Seen My Girl? (Russian: Кто-нибудь видел мою девчонку?, romanized: Kto-nibud videl moyu devchonku?) is a 2020 Russian drama film directed by Angelina Nikonova.

It was theatrically released in Russia on February 4, 2021, by Central Partnership.

== Plot ==
The film follows Kira (Victoria Isakova), a successful magazine editor in Paris, who is haunted by memories of Sergey Dobrovsky, the man she lost 17 years ago. She copes with her grief by writing him letters. The narrative shifts to early 1990s Leningrad, where a young Kira (Anna Chipovskaya) falls in love with Dobrovsky, a film studies teacher. Their romance is marred by Kira's three miscarriages and Dobrovsky's alcoholism, which derails his filmmaking dreams.

As Sergey gains recognition as a critic, Kira begins an affair with her editor, Maxim, which leads to her leaving Dobrovsky. After she becomes pregnant, Dobrovsky succumbs to drugs and dies from an overdose. Kira learns of his death from Maxim, who withheld the news to protect her. Unable to forgive him, Kira ends their relationship. Back in Paris, Kira also breaks up with the younger Sergey after he discovers her unsent letters to Dobrovsky, finalizing her emotional closure.

== Cast ==
- Viktoriya Isakova as Kira
  - Anna Chipovskaya as Kira in youth
- Alexander Gorchilin as Sergei
- Yuri Borisov as Sergei II
- Yuri Chursin as Maksim
- Mariya Shalayeva as Liza
- Aleksey Zolotovitsky as Burovsky
- Ivan Dobronravov as Tolik

== Critical response ==
Zinaida Pronchenko, in her review, notes that the film has predictably all the shortcomings inherent in the pop biopic genre, the model is not given to the artist, although they take it in different poses. Nothing is clear about Dobrotvorsky from the plot.

According to Stanislav Zelvensky, despite all the numerous formal weaknesses (finally, let's add the old-fashioned, erroneous use of voice-over and an awkward metafinal), the film deserves attention like any work done sincerely and with some thoughts.
