= Ovcharenko =

Ovcharenko (Ukrainian: Овчаренко) is a surname. Notable people with the surname include:

- Artem Ovcharenko (born 1986), Russian ballet dancer
- Gennady Ovcharenko (born 1964), Russian artist
- Halyna Ovcharenko, Ukrainian composer
- Nina Ovcharenko (born 1984), Ukrainian cyclist
- Victor Ovcharenko (1943–2009), Russian philosopher and scientist
- Vladislava Ovcharenko (born 1986), Tajikistani sprinter
- Yuriy Ovcharenko (born 1968), Ukrainian footballer
