= Countdown (2004 film) =

- DVD cover
- Directed by: Evgeny Lavrentiev
- Written by: Evgeniy Lavrentev; Yuri Sagaidak
- Produced by: Marianna Balashova; Sergey Gribkov; Yuri Sagaidak; Vladimir Trushchenkov; Ruslan Vitryanyuk
- Starring: Alexei Makarov; Louise Lombard; Vyacheslav Razbegaev; Egor Pazenko; Yuriy Tsurilo; Viktor Verzhbitskiy; Ramil Sabitov; John Amos; Mariya Golubkina; Orso Maria Guerrini; Mariya Semkina
- Cinematography: Stasch Radwanski Jr. Dmitry Shlykov
- Edited by: Alexander Hachko; Dmitriy Slobtsov
- Music by: Paul Lawler
- Release date: December 9, 2004
- Running time: 100 minutes
- Country: Russia
- Languages: Russian, English, Arabic, Belarusian, Chechen
- Budget: $7 million

Countdown (also known as Personal Number, Russian: Личный номер) is a Russian action movie directed by Yevgeny Lavrentyev with a $7 million budget, which was huge for Russia of that time, and released in Moscow in December 2004.

The Federal Security Service of the Russian Federation (FSB) assisted the shooting. Former Deputy FSB Director Vladimir Anisimov was hired consultant. The movie was sponsored by Sibneft and Channel 1.

Despite its dubious artistic qualities, Countdown dramatizes many real life political concerns. In the very beginning the plot of the movie closely follows details of the independent investigation of the 1999 Russian apartment bombings described in the book Blowing Up Russia: Terror from Within by Yury Felshtinsky and Alexander Litvinenko, representing them as parts of the plan masterminded and sponsored by exiled tycoon Pokrovsky (obvious hint at Boris Berezovsky in real life) and aimed to discredit Russian security services. As this plan has failed, Pokrovsky assisted by some terrorists organizes a hostage taking in a Moscow circus (very similar to Moscow theater hostage crisis in real life) in order to return to Russia, acting as a saver of the hostages during negotiations. However, he fails to do so. The movie also depicts the Pankisi Gorge in Georgia as a place where an important Islamic militant hides, which was a common allegation by Russian authorities in real life around that time, and depicts destruction of a base of terrorists and allies of Pokrovsky in Qatar which might hint at the assassination of Zelimkhan Yandarbiev. Overall, the movie was widely considered propaganda.

== Cast ==
- Alexei Makarov as Maj. Aleksei Smolin
- Louise Lombard as Catherine Stone
- Vyacheslav Razbegaev as Umar Tamiev
- Viktor Verzhbitskiy as Lev Pokrovskiy
- Egor Pazenko as Saulyus Boykis
- Ramil Sabitov as Khasan
- John Amos as Admiral Melory
- Orso Maria Guerrini as Italian Prime Minister
- Yuriy Tsurilo as Gen. Sergei Karpov
- Xenia Fedorova as Journalist in press-center (credited as Ksenia Borchik)
