= Aeterna (TV series) =

- Этерна
- Genre: Fantasy; Drama; Adventure
- Created by: Evgeny Rene; Evgeny Baranov
- Based on: Refelections of Aeterna series by Vera Kamsha
- Written by: Sergei Yudakov; Evgeny Baranov
- Directed by: Evgeny Nevsky
- Composer: Ryan Otter
- Country of origin: Russia
- Original language: Russian
- No. of seasons: 1

Production
- Executive producer: Pavel Malakhov
- Producers: Evgeny Rene; Evgeny Baranov; Dmitry Nelidov; Olga Filipuk
- Production company: Black Prince

Original release
- Network: Kinopoisk
- Release: 20 January 2022

Aeterna is a Russian fantasy TV series based on a series of novels by Vera Kamsha Reflections of Aeterna. The project is being produced by Black Prince. The premiere of the show took place on 20 January 2022 in the online cinema Kinopoisk with only the pilot episode being released, which the filmmakers described as a "test". A reboot has been announced with a new cast.

== Plot ==
Kertiana, the world created by the four Gods, flourished under their rule for a thousand years. Four left this world and bequeathed to keep Kertiana to their heirs: King Rakan and four Lords. Every 400 years, the time of the Great Break comes, and only Rakan and the Lords keep the world from destruction. Thousands of years have passed, and the Gods have not returned. Rakan and the lords forgot their purpose, and troubled times fell on Karthian. At the turn of the eras, Ollar the Conqueror goes to war against King Rakan. The conqueror is supported by the Lord of the Wind and opens the gates of the impregnable capital. The King's heir is rescued by the Lord of the Rocks, sheltering him from the holy city of Agaris. 400 years before the start of the events of the series, the rulers of the Rakan dynasty were overthrown from the throne of the central state of Talig by the Ollar family. But the legend says: the powers of the Ollars will last 400 years. And now the Lord of the Rocks Oakdell raises a rebellion, but dies from the sword of the Lord of the Wind Alva. Deprived of their leader, the rebels flee. And only the clan of the Lord of Lightning Epine protects the retreating army. Everyone dies in battle, except for the younger Robert.

== Actors and roles ==
=== Starring ===
| Actor | Role |
|---|---|
| Yuri Chursin | Roque Alva Commander, First Marshal Taliga, Lord of the Winds and Duke of the Province of Canalloa |
| Denis Nurulin | Richard Oakdell is a young duke from the northern province of Nador seeking revenge for his father's death. |
| Pavel Krainov | Robert Épinay is Aldo's best friend and faithful companion |
| Anar Khalilov | Aldo Rakan is a descendant of the Rakan dynasty that ruled in Taliga, living in exile and dreaming of power and greatness. |
| Valentia Lyapina | Mallit is a bright and fearless girl who is connected with Aldo by the bonds of ancient magic. |
| Sergey Gilyov | Father German priest of Ollarism, mentor at the Laik school |
| Sergei Goroshko | Esteban Colignard heir to the ducal title, Richard's main rival at the Laic school |

=== Minor roles ===
| Actor | Role |
|---|---|
| Kirill Zaytsev | Lionel Savignac General of Talig, head of the royal guard, elder brother of Arnaud |
| Ekaterina Volkova | Mathilde Rakan Aldo's grandmother, Dowager Princess Rakan |
| Varvara Komarova | Iris Oakdell Richard's younger sister |
| Ulyana Lukina | Mirabella Oakdell mother of Richard and Iris, widow of Egmont |
| Kirill Kozakov | Enniol head of the Gogan community |
| Yury Belyayev | Cardinal Sylvester head of the Ollarian church, de facto ruler of all Talig |
| Alexey Matoshin | Arnold Aramona captain, head of the Laik squire school |
| Maxim Metelnikov | Arnaud Savignac Richard's friend at Laic school, Lionel's younger brother |
| Evgeny Schwartz | Veltine Prydd heir to the House of Waves, classmate of Richard at Laik High |
| Yulia Khlynina | Katarina (Katari) Ollar Queen Taliga |
| Denis Samoilov | Ferdinand Ollar King Taliga, soft and weak-willed ruler, for whom Cardinal Sylvester makes decisions |

== Production ==
The start of work on the project began in September 2020. The series was produced by Evgeny Baranov and Evgeny Rene, with creative producers Nikita Sugakov and Vladislav Rubin. The director of the first part is Evgeny Nevsky and the screenwriters are Sergey Yudakov and Evgent Baranov. The production designer is Anastasia Karimulina and the cameraman is Alexander Simonov and Antoine Vivas - Denisov. The Black Prince company was created especially for filming the series. In 2019, a teaser for the series was filmed in Moscow.

The producer of the series, Yevgeny Baranov and Yevgeny Rene, planned to shoot five seasons with 10 episodes each.

Filming of the first part took place in Moscow and St. Petersburg.
