= The Three Musketeers (2013 film) =

Russian historical adventure film

- Theatrical release poster
- Три мушкетёра
- Directed by: Sergei Zhigunov; Alexey Zlobin
- Written by: Andrey Zhidkov; Sergei Zhigunov
- Based on: The Three Musketeers by Alexandre Dumas, père
- Produced by: Sergei Zhigunov
- Starring: Yuri Chursin; Alexei Makarov; Pavel Barshak; Rinal Mukhametov
- Cinematography: The Sergei Zhigunov Production Center; Prime Time Studios
- Music by: Alexey Shelygin
- Distributed by: Mosfilm
- Release date: November 14, 2013
- Running time: 112 minutes
- Country: Russia
- Language: Russian
- Budget: $12 million
- Box office: $1.2 million

The Three Musketeers (Russian: «Три мушкетёра», tri mushketera) is a 2013 Russian historical adventure film based on the 1844 novel The Three Musketeers by Alexandre Dumas, père. It was produced by The Production Center of Sergei Zhigunov.

The film has been released in two versions: as a two-hour movie in cinemas on November 14, 2013. and as a TV series consisting of 10 episodes of 45 minutes. The TV series was first shown in December 2013 on the Ukrainian 1+1 Channel and then on Russia's Channel One Russia in January 2014.

Young d'Artagnan is coming to Paris to be a musketeer. There he meets three old musketeers, members of the glorious King's Guard, but actually realizes that they are not the great fighters who he thinks they are. While joining the musketeers he is faced with the hidden plots of Cardinal Richelieu, his spy Milady de Winter and a possible war against England.

== Plot summary ==
In 1625 France, a poor young nobleman named d'Artagnan leaves his parents in Gascony and travels to Paris to join the Musketeers of the Guard. At an inn in Meung-sur-Loire, an older man derides d'Artagnan's horse. Insulted, d'Artagnan demands a duel with him. The older man's companions beat d'Artagnan unconscious with a cooking pot and a metal tong that breaks his sword. His letter of introduction to Monsieur de Tréville, the commander of the Musketeers, is stolen. D'Artagnan resolves to avenge himself upon the man (later revealed to him as Comte de Rochefort, an agent of Cardinal Richelieu, who is in Meung to pass orders from the Cardinal to Milady de Winter, another of his agents).

In Paris, d'Artagnan visits de Tréville at the headquarters of the Musketeers, but the meeting is overshadowed by the loss of his letter, and de Tréville politely refuses his application. He does, however, write a letter of introduction to an academy for young gentlemen, which may prepare him for recruitment at a later time. From de Tréville's window, d'Artagnan sees Rochefort passing in the street below and rushes out of the building to confront him, but in doing so he separately causes offence to three of the Musketeers, Athos, Porthos, and Aramis, who each demand satisfaction; d'Artagnan must duel each of them in turn that afternoon.

When the three friends learn that d'Artagnan is a virgin they refuse to fight him. At this point, Cardinal Richelieu's guards appear and try to arrest d'Artagnan and the three Musketeers for illegal dueling. Although outnumbered, the four men win the battle. D'Artagnan seriously wounds Jussac, one of the Cardinal's officers and a renowned fighter. After learning of this event, King Louis XIII appoints d'Artagnan to des Essart's company of the King's Guards and gives him forty pistoles.

D'Artagnan falls in love at first sight with the pretty, young and married Constance Bonacieux. She works for the Queen Consort of France, Anne of Austria, who is secretly conducting an affair with the Duke of Buckingham. The Queen has received a gift of diamond studs from her husband Louis XIII. Anne gives the diamonds to her lover as a keepsake. Cardinal Richelieu, who wants war between France and England, plans to expose the tryst. He persuades the King to demand that the Queen wear the diamonds to a soirée that the Cardinal is sponsoring.

Constance tries to send her cowardly husband to London, but the man is manipulated by Richelieu and does not go. D'Artagnan and his friends intercede. En route they are repeatedly attacked by the Cardinal's henchmen, and only d'Artagnan and Planchet reach London. Before their arrival, d'Artagnan is compelled to assault and nearly kill the Comte de Wardes, who is a friend of the Cardinal, a cousin of Rochefort, and Milady's lover. Although two of the diamond studs have been stolen by Milady, the Duke of Buckingham is able to provide replacements while delaying the thief's return to Paris. D'Artagnan is thus able to return a complete set of jewels to Queen Anne just in time to save her honor. He receives from her a beautiful ring as an expression of her gratitude. Shortly afterwards, d'Artagnan begins an affair with Madame Bonacieux. Arriving for one of their assignations, he notices signs of a struggle and discovers that Rochefort and M. Bonacieux, acting under the orders of the Cardinal, have assaulted and imprisoned her.

D'Artagnan retrieves his friends, who have just recovered from their injuries, and brings them back to Paris. D'Artagnan meets Milady de Winter officially, and recognizes her as one of the Cardinal's agents from Meung, but this does not deter him. D'Artagnan becomes infatuated with the beautiful lady, but her handmaiden reveals that Milady is indifferent toward him. Entering her quarters in the dark, he pretends to be the Comte de Wardes and trysts with her. He finds a fleur-de-lis branded on Milady's shoulder, marking her as a felon. Discovering his identity, Milady attempts to kill him, but d'Artagnan eludes her. He is ordered to the siege of La Rochelle. He is informed that the Queen has rescued Constance from prison. In an inn, the musketeers overhear the Cardinal asking Milady to murder the Duke of Buckingham, a supporter of the Protestant rebels at La Rochelle who has sent troops to assist them. Richelieu gives her a letter that excuses her actions as under orders from the Cardinal himself, but Athos takes it from her. The next morning, Athos bets that he, d'Artagnan, Porthos, and Aramis, and their servants can hold the recaptured St. Gervais bastion against the rebels for an hour. They resist for an hour and a half before retreating, killing 22 Rochellese in total. They warn Lord de Winter and the Duke of Buckingham. Milady is imprisoned on arrival in England but seduces her guard, Felton (a fictionalization of the real John Felton), and persuades him to allow her escape and to kill Buckingham himself.

On her return to France, Milady hides in a convent where Constance is also staying. The naive Constance clings to Milady, who sees a chance to avenge herself on d'Artagnan. Milady fatally poisons Constance before d'Artagnan can rescue her.

The Musketeers apprehend Milady before she can reach the protection of Cardinal Richelieu. They bring an official executioner, put her on trial and sentence her to death. After her execution, the four friends return to the siege of La Rochelle. The Comte de Rochefort arrests d'Artagnan and takes him straight to the Cardinal. When questioned about Milady's execution, d'Artagnan presents her letter of pardon as his own. The Cardinal laughs at this arrogance, but he is impressed with d'Artagnan's wilfulness. Secretly glad to be rid of the treacherous Milady, the Cardinal destroys the letter and writes a new order, giving the bearer a promotion to lieutenant in de Treville's company of musketeers, leaving the name blank. D'Artagnan then offers the letter to Athos, Porthos, and Aramis in turn, but each refuses it proclaiming d'Artagnan the most worthy among them.

== Cast ==
- Yuri Chursin as Athos
- Alexei Makarov as Porthos
- Pavel Barshak as Aramis
- Rinal Mukhametov as d'Artagnan
- Anna Starshenbaum as Constance Bonacieux
- Ekaterina Vilkova as Milady
- Vasily Lanovoy as Cardinal Richelieu
- Maria Mironova as Queen Anne
- Philip Yankovski as King Louis XIII
- Konstantin Lavronenko as Duke of Buckingham
- Alexey Vorobyov as Lord de Winter
- Alexander Lykov As Monsieur de Tréville
- Viktor Rakov as Mr. Bonacieux
- Vladimir Zaytsev as Captain Rochefort
- Kseniya Kutepova as Solicitor, Madame Coquenard
- Boris Smolkin as Mr. Coquenard
- Ville Haapasalo as Farmer
- Vladimir Etush as English jeweler
- Yekaterina Olkina as Duchess de Chevreuse
- Agata Muceniece as Maid Ket

== Production ==
=== Casting ===
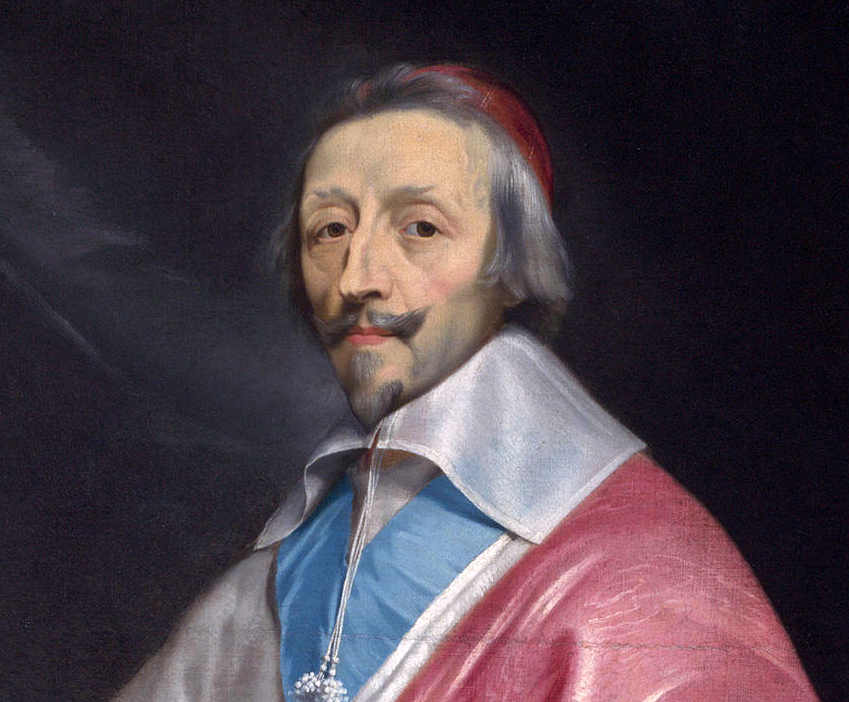
Cardinal Richelieu, in his 50s

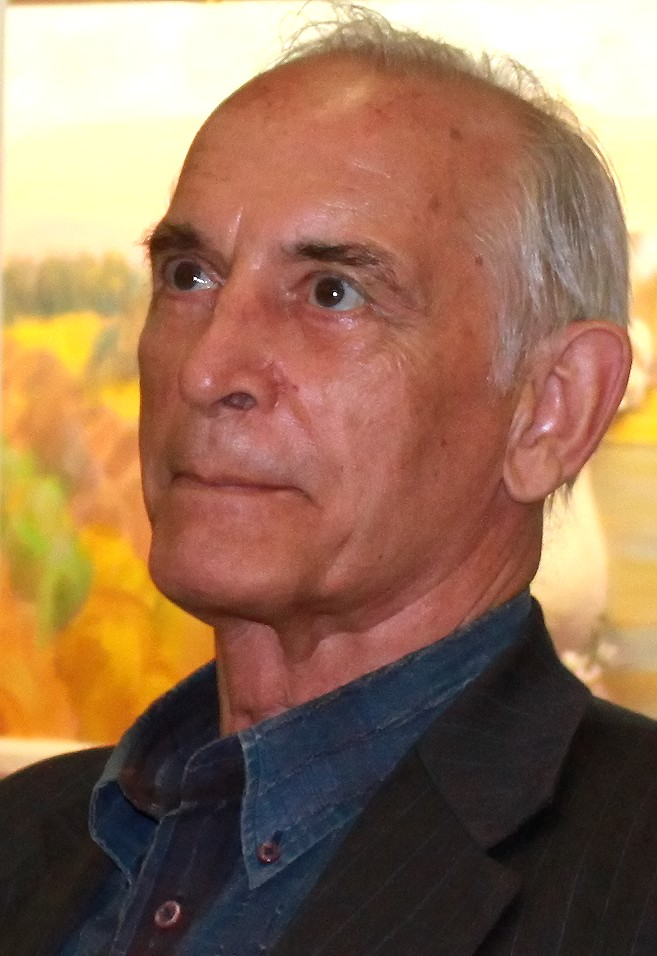
Vasily Lanovoy, who portrays Richelieu in the film. He was 79 years old when the film was released.

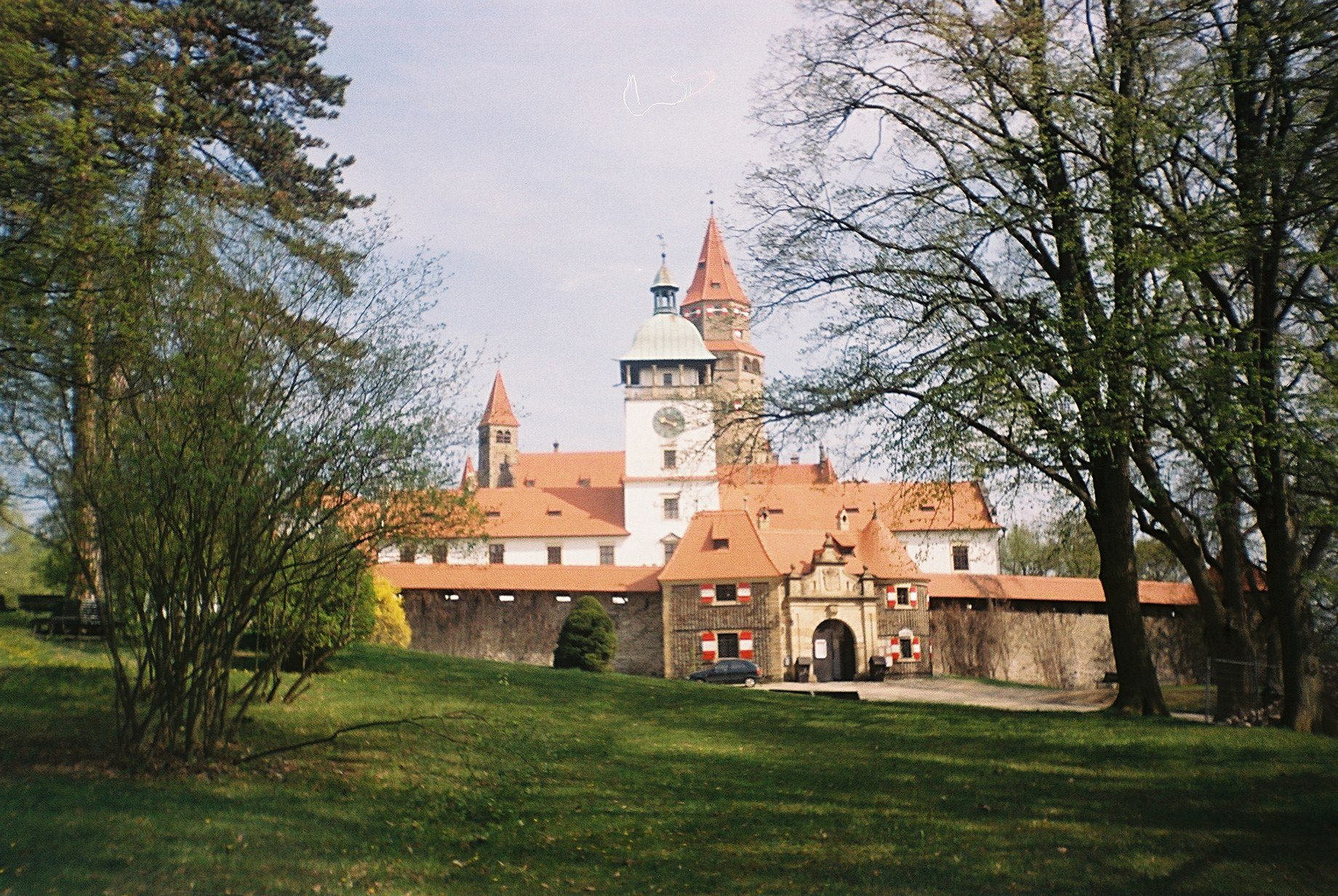
Bouzov Castle

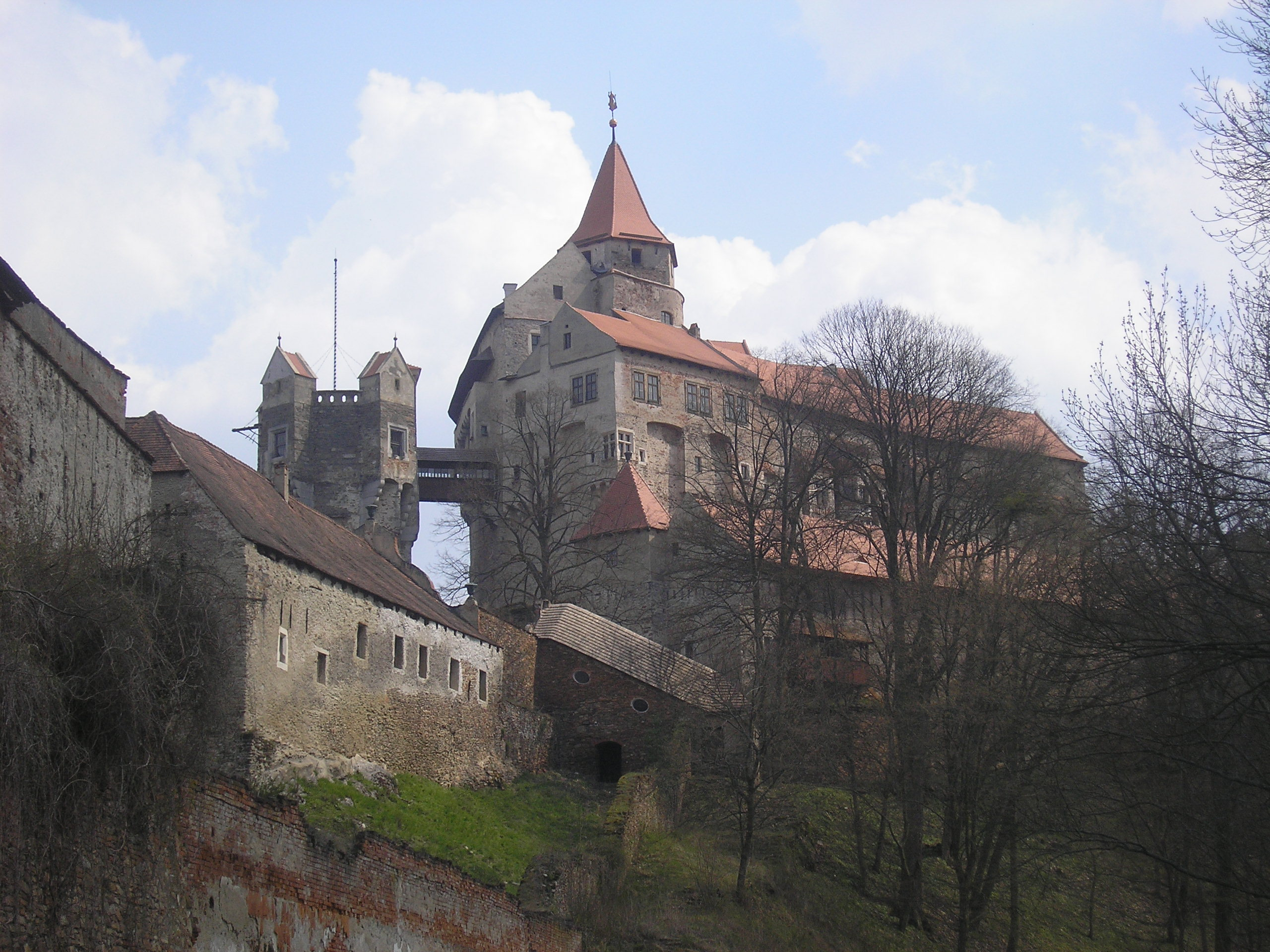
Pernštejn Castle

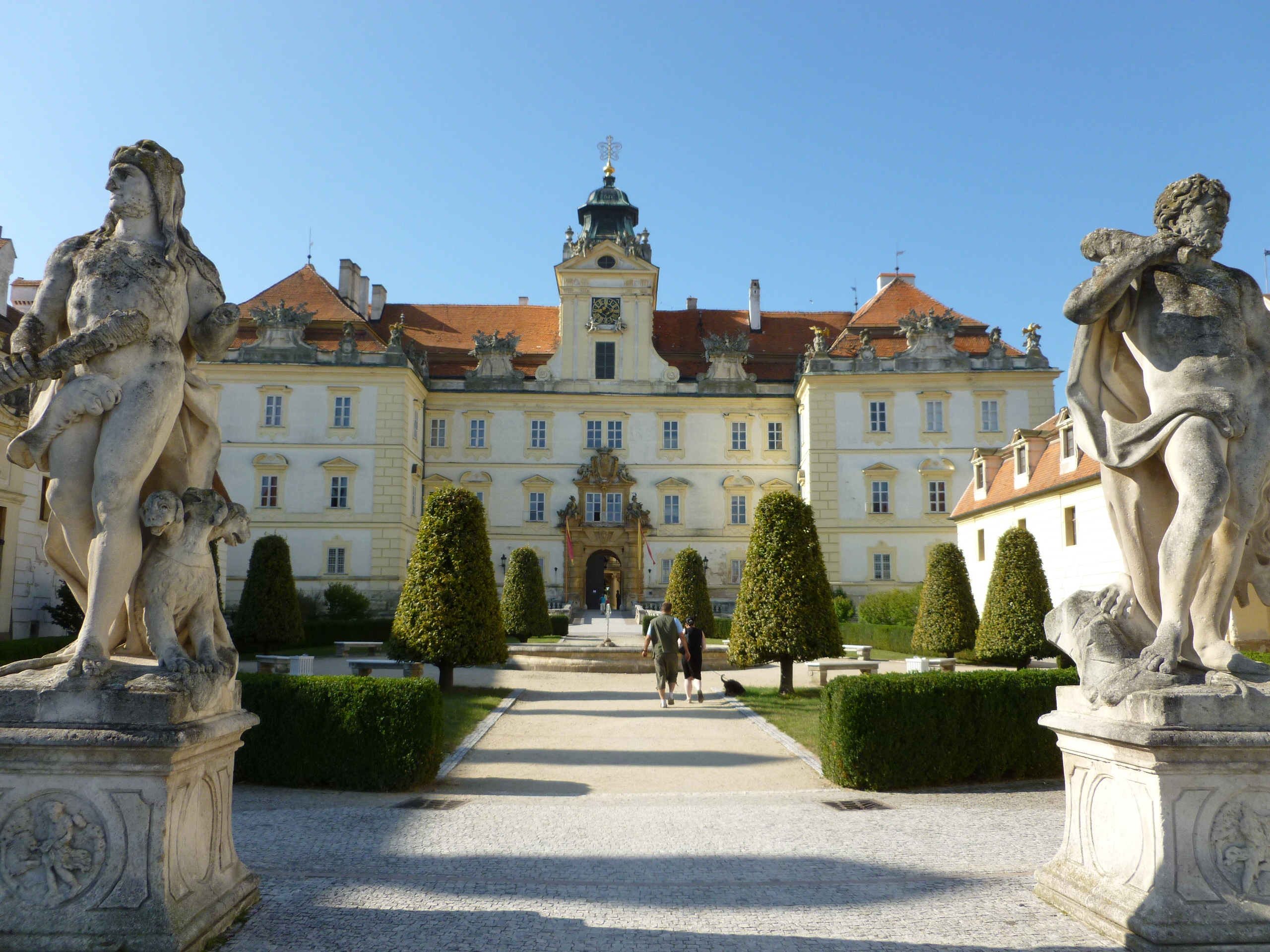
Valtice, Czech Republic

According to director Sergey Zhigunov, "I tried to collect an ensemble of artists of high level (I do not have time and effort to educate people on the site), known but which are old-old in the audience. People are very tired of the actors, who are always filming in TV series, ordinary people start to cause irritation".

At one point, there were reference to the previous Soviet-musical telefilm; with Mikhail Boyarsky cast as the role of D'Artagnan, a father, but according to Zhigunov, "then we have decided that it is wrong – mix so that old movie that still viewers are watching with pleasure, and our, new. It will be a completely different".

According to Zhigunov, while casting they tried not to follow the rumors: for example, while they learning from the tabloids that "Anastasia Zavorotnyuk will be cast as Constance" he said that he "almost fainted. Wildly funny and absurd about the rumor.

=== Script ===
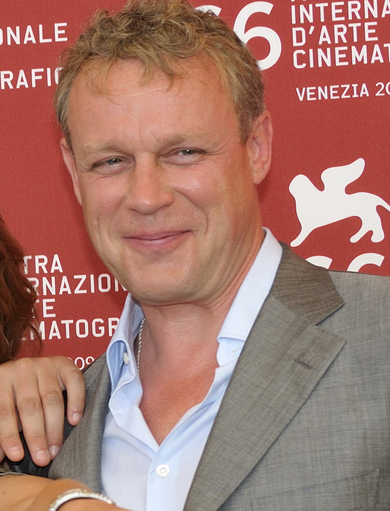
Sergey Zhigunov, Director of The Three Musketeers.

Sergei Zhigunov wrote the script, and he is the director and producer. In his words: "I am very respectful attitude to Dumas, his books live hundreds of years, so do not allow yourself to take liberties with the plot. I did not touch him, but strongly worked on dialogue, painted a more detailed story lines, characters endowed with new features. The result was a dynamic history, adapted to the perception of the modern viewer. And the characters, in my opinion, are brighter and more expressive, more vivid and understandable".

Unlike previous adaptations of the project, he said that "We care about the fact that it was written by the author. Therefore, we have retained the basic plot lines and motifs, but changed the structure of the relationships between the characters. Added pace and rhythm, adapted stories by today's audience... We have developed a line of Mrs. Coquenard and Porthos relations, the relations between Aramis and Madame de Chevreuse will also be shown with the utmost precision. The drama develops the relationship between Athos and Milady. And the line of Buckingham and Anne of Austria was spelled wider and more, it also receives an unexpected continuation. In the novel, a lot of interesting plot twists and scenes that directors usually pass by".

Before that, Zhigunov produced adaptations of two other Dumas novels: Queen Margot (1997) and The Countess de Monsoreau (1997).

=== Filming ===
Filming was started on August 1, 2012 and was completed in three months to release the film in the spring of 2013. Before September 18, the first half of the filming was finished in Gatchina.

Filming took place in the Czech Republic: in Bouzov and Pernštejn castles, in the city of Olomouc and town of Kutná Hora, and Russia: in Vyborg, Petergof, including the Grand Palace, and Gatchina – in the Gatchina Palace. The Siege of La Rochelle was shot on the Gulf of Finland.

=== Costumes ===
All of the costumes for the main characters were sewn to order from expensive fabrics, hand lace and semiprecious stones. For example, one dress worn by the queen is 78,000 rubles. Costumes for extras take rent – in the Czech Republic, Spain and France. Specially constructed carriage suspension Queen was made to order in a Moscow studio.

=== Music ===
The music was written by Russian composer Alexey Shelygin using old French songs. The soundtrack was recorded in Air Studio by London Symphony Orchestra and conducted by Nick Ingman.

== Criticism ==
=== Comparison with the film in 1978 ===
On the eve of the start of filming Zhigunov said that his adaptation of The Three Musketeers is sure to be compared with the film adaptation by George Jungvald-Khilkevich. According to Zhigunov, "It is clear that the critics can not be avoided. But just want to say I did not set goals to compete with anyone. I'm going to film the novel by Dumas, and not to shoot a remake of. In the end, every generation should have a D'Artagnan. We had Mikhail Boyarsky, so let the young generation to have someone else."

== See also ==
- d'Artagnan and Three Musketeers, Soviet popular musical film
