= Playing the Victim (film) =

- Directed by: Kirill Serebrennikov
- Produced by: Natalia Mokritskaya; Uliana Savelieva; Leonid Zagalsky
- Starring: Yuri Chursin; Vitali Khayev
- Edited by: Olga Grinshpun
- Music by: Alexander Manotskov
- Distributed by: West (Russia)
- Release date: 2006
- Running time: 100 minutes
- Country: Russia
- Language: Russian

Playing the Victim (Russian: «Изображая жертву») is a Russian 2006 black comedy film.

== Plot ==
Valya, a 30-year-old university drop-out, works for the police acting out murder victims during reconstructions of crimes. His co-workers are a charismatic straight-edge captain, camerawoman Lyuda, and a dim-witted sergeant Seva. At home, Valya's widowed mother has started a relationship with Valya's uncle, who considers Valya to be a "punk" and thinks he should get a normal job. At night Valya has recurring nightmares of his father, who also seems to disapprove of him.

Throughout the film, we see the reconstructions taped by Lyuda (from the perspective of her camera), in which the captain has the accused recreate their actions step by step. These scenes are often riddled with absurdly comical situations that contrast the grim nature of the work being done. Valya does not seem to take anything seriously, which irritates the captain, amuses the sergeant, and infuriates his uncle/stepfather.

As the movie progresses, the strain of work causes the captain to lose his temper. This culminates in a five-minute profane rant about the state of Russia's new generation and football team. Later on, Valya feeds poisoned Japanese food to his family and recently pregnant girlfriend. In the recreation, three other people play the victims, while Valya is the accused. When asked what he did as they were dying, he says that he was taking everything in so that he could accurately reconstruct what happened. In the final scene, Valya has a flashback where his father throws him out of a rowboat to teach him to swim, an event mentioned earlier in the film by his mother.

== Cast ==
- Yuri Chursin as Valya
- Vitali Khayev as Captain
- Aleksandr Ilyin, Jr. as Seva
- Svetlana Ivanova as Stasya
- Marat Basharov as Karas'
- Olga Demidova as Woman cafe worker
- Marina Golub as Valya's mother
- Anna Mikhalkova as Lyuda
- Fyodor Dobronravov as Valya's father / Uncle Petia
- Andrei Fomin as Sysoev
- Yelena Morozova as Olya
- Natalya Mokritskaya as Woman working in swimming pool
- Igor Gasparian as Zakirov
- Maksim Konovalov as Verkhushkin
- Aleksey Marchenko as Manager of Japanese restaurant
- Liya Akhedzhakova as Waitress in Japanese restaurant

== Awards ==
- Winner of the Open Russian Film Festival "Kinotavr", Russia 2006.
- Grand Prize Winner, 1st Rome Film Festival, Italy (Cinema 2006) October 13–21, 2006.
- Shown at Tallinn Black Nights Film Festival, Estonia, 3 December 2006.
- Shown at International Film Festival Rotterdam, Netherlands. 25 January 2007.
- Shown at European Film Market, Germany. 9 February 2007.
- Shown at 6th Russian Film Week in New York, October 13–19, 2006, New York City, United States.
- Shown at Tribeca Film Festival (World Narrative Feature Competition)New York City, United States April 25-May 6, 2007.
- Shown at Era New Horizons Film Festival, Poland. 21 July 2007.
- Shown at Kinoart Film Festival, Toronto, Canada, 2007
- Shown at 28th Durban International Film Festival 20 June-1 July 2007.
- Shown at 7th goEast Festival of Central and Eastern European Films in Wiesbaden, Germany
- March 28 - April 3, 2007, the film won Honorable Mentions
- Shown at Copenhagen International Film Festival, Denmark, 22 September 2007.

== Bibliography ==
- Gaydin, Boris N. (2023), "Playing the Victim (Hamlet, dir. Kirill Serebrennikov, Moscow, Russia, 2004)", The Palgrave Encyclopedia of Global Shakespeare, Cham: Palgrave Macmillan, pp. 1–6, doi:10.1007/978-3-319-99378-2_174-1, ISBN 978-3-319-99378-2, archived from the original on 18 September 2024.
