= Yuri Chursin =

Russian actor

- Юрий Чурсин
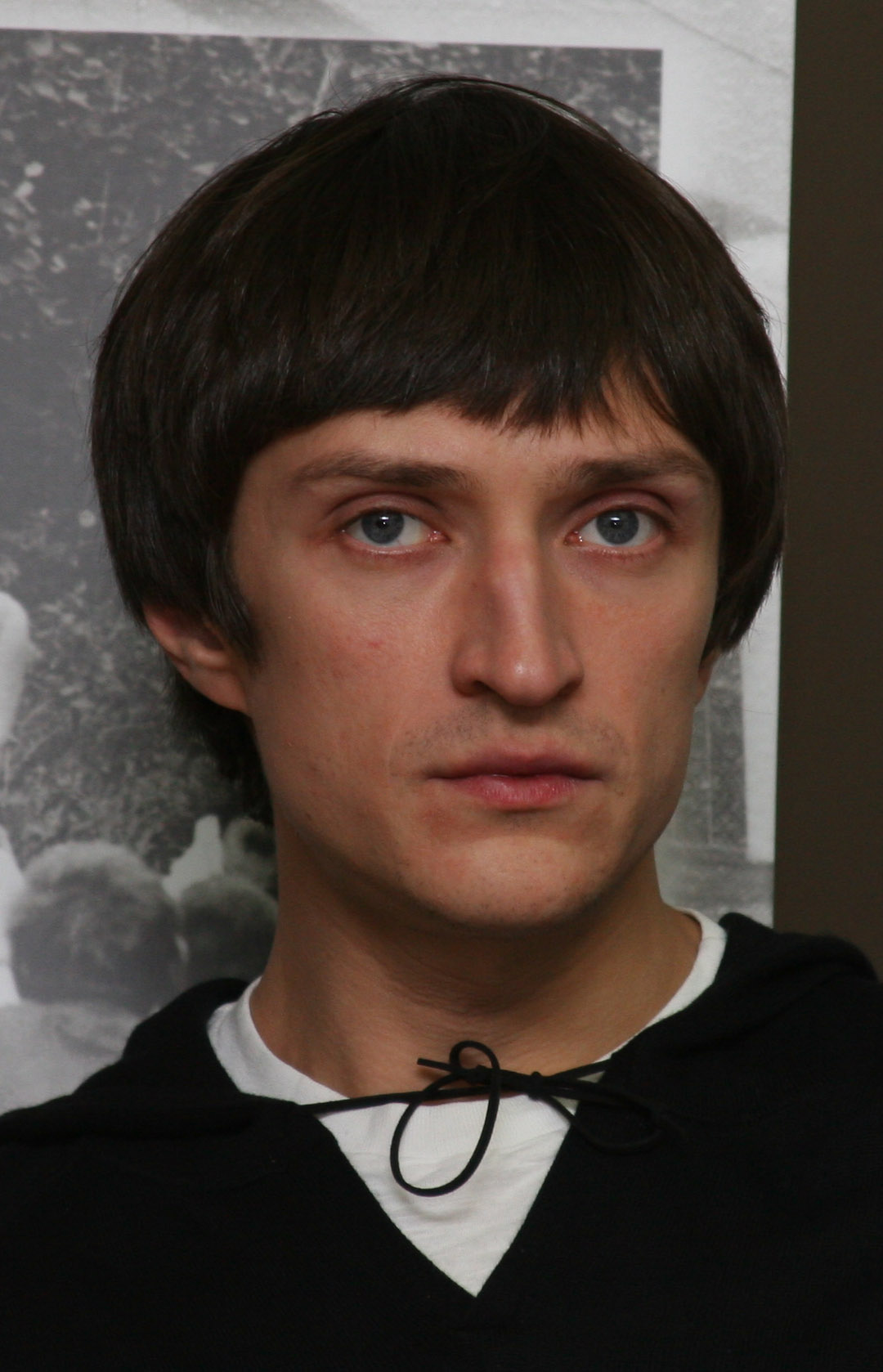
- Yuri Chursin is an actor of the theater.
- Born: Yuri Anatolyevich Chursin; 11 March 1980 (age 46); Priozersk, Karaganda Region, Kazakh SSR, USSR
- Education: Boris Shchukin Theatre Institute
- Occupation: Actor
- Years active: 1999–present
- Spouse: Anna Chursina
- Children: 2

Yuri Anatolyevich Chursin (Russian: Юрий Анатольевич Чурсин; born 11 March 1980) is a Russian actor who is known for Playing the Victim, The Three Musketeers and Mafia: The Game of Survival.

== Life and career ==
Yuri Chursin was born in Priozersk, Karaganda Region, Kazakh Soviet Socialist Republic, Soviet Union (now Kazakhstan), in a Russian family of a soldier. In 1997, he graduated from the Lyceum № 17 of the city of Khimki, Moscow Oblast.

In 2001, he graduated from the acting department of the Boris Shchukin Theatre Institute and was accepted to the troupe of the Vakhtangov State Academic Theatre.

In 2022, Chursin starred in Amore More – a dramedy series about polyamorous relationships.

In the same year, he also starred in fantasy series Aeterna based on books by writer Vera Kamsha.

== Selected filmography ==
Year	Title	Role	Notes
2006	Playing the Victim	Valya	
2013	The Three Musketeers	Athos	
2016	Mafia: The Game of Survival	Konstantin	
2017	You All Infuriate Me	Alexander	
2018	Beyond the Edge	Kevin, hypnotist, member of the scam team Michael	
2019	Gold Diggers	Filipp Krasnov	TV
2020	Has Anyone Seen My Girl?	Maksim	
2020	Passengers	Viktor	TV
2022	Aeterna		TV
2022	Little Red Riding Hood	Hardy	

== Award and nominations ==
- 2007 - Russian National Movie Awards
  - Best Russian Actor Nominee
- 2007 - Nika Award
  - Discovery of the Year Nominee for the film Playing the Victim
- 2012 - Golden Eagle Award (Russia)
  - Best Television Actor Nominee for the TV series Prison Break
- 2014 - Russian National Movie Awards
  - Best Russian Actor of the Decade Nominee
