= Graveyard Shift (2005 film) =

- Directed by: Valeri Rozhnov
- Starring: Pavel Barshak; Viktor Sukhorukov
- Release date: 20 January 2005
- Running time: 1h 25min
- Country: Russia
- Language: Russian

Graveyard Shift (Russian: Ночной продавец, romanized: Nochnoy prodavets) is a 2005 Russian comedy thriller film directed by Valeri Rozhnov.

== Cast ==
- Pavel Barshak - Danya, night salesman
- Viktor Sukhorukov - Day salesman
- Ingeborga Dapkūnaitė - Shopkeeper's wife
- Andrey Krasko - Detective
- Vyacheslav Razbegaev - Shopkeeper
- Mariya Shalayeva - Danya's girlfriend
- Andrey Merzlikin - Customer
- Spartak Mishulin - Customer
