= Little Red Riding Hood (2022 film) =

- Directed by: Lina Arifulina; Aleksandr Barshak; Artyom Aksenenko
- Written by: Viktor Zaytsev; Artyom Aksenenko; Daniil Vorobyov; Aleksandr Barshak
- Produced by: Lina Arifulina; Yana Gergel
- Starring: Taisya Kalinina; Danila Yakushev; Ekaterina Klimova; Irina Rozanova; Alexey Barabash; Aleksey Serebryakov; Yuriy Chursin
- Cinematography: Ivan Gudkov; Vyacheslav Lisnevskiy
- Edited by: Igor Otdelnov
- Music by: Alim Zairov; Alexander Parkhomenko
- Production companies: Three A Film Company; Entire Promo Lab
- Distributed by: Central Partnership
- Release date: September 22, 2022 (Russia)
- Running time: 96 minutes
- Country: Russia
- Language: Russian

Little Red Riding Hood (Russian: Красная Шапочка, romanized: Krasnaya Shapochka) is a 2022 Russian children's fantasy film directed by Lina Arifulina, Aleksandr Barshak and Artyom Aksenenko. It was theatrically released on September 22, 2022.

== Plot ==
The action of the fantastic tape begins long before the birth of Little Red Riding Hood and tells about her origin. A hundred years ago, two warring clans concluded a truce: the Wolfboys, the defenders of the fairytale city, agreed with the hawks that they would not leave the territory of the forest. For some time, the agreement was respected, but then werewolves began to be increasingly noticed near the settlement. The main Wolfboy and the father of Little Red Riding Hood decides to fight back dangerous predators, but dies in an unequal battle. The city is left defenseless and is at the mercy of Westar, the leader of a pack of wolves. Little Red Riding Hood's mother and her grandmother manage to get out of the panic-stricken city and reach a secluded place. After some time, a wonderful child is born who knows nothing about either his father or his destiny.

Only at the age of twelve, Little Red Riding Hood learns the secret of her kind when her mother and grandmother finally tell her about her father and what happened to him. Now the girl has to do what her father failed to – stop dangerous predators that threaten people again.

== Cast ==
- Taisya Kalinina as Red Riding Hood
- Danila Yakushev as Wolfboy (also tr. Volkoboy)
- Ekaterina Klimova as Marie, mother
- Irina Rozanova as grandmother
- Alexey Barabash as Alex
- Aleksey Serebryakov as Westar
- Oleg Chugunov as Maurice, Westar's grandson
- Yuriy Chursin as Hardy
- Nino Ninida as Berta
- Pavel Kuzmin as Rogan
- Ivan Kokorin as Borges
- Nataliya Medvedeva as Dana

== Music ==
The title musical theme of the picture was the composition of the group "Bi-2" and "Wolves" (by the way, the musicians will also appear in the frame). Also, Anet Sai's track "Do not Let Go" will sound in the tape.
