= Pavel Barshak =

Russian actor

- Born: Pavel Dmitrievich Barshak; Moscow, RSFSR, USSR
- Occupation: Actor
- Years active: 2002-present

Pavel Dmitrievich Barshak is a Russian actor. He appeared in more than thirty films since 2002.

== Early life ==
Pavel Barshak was born in Moscow, Russian SFSR, Soviet Union in southern Russia.

== Selected filmography ==
Film
Year	Title	Role	Notes
2003	The Stroll	Alyosha	
2005	Graveyard Shift	Danya	
2006	Piter FM	Pasha, young man with flowers	
2011	Yolki 2	Yerkhov	
2013	The Three Musketeers	Aramis	
2018	Yolki 7	Yerkhov	
2019	Union of Salvation	Veniamin Solovyev, baron, stabs-kapitan of the Chernigov Regiment revolt	
2021	Koschey: The Everlasting Story	Prince Beloyar (voice)	

TV
Year	Title	Role	Notes
2005	Adjutants of Love	Mikhael Lugin	
2011	Game	Alexey Smolin	
