= Gennady Ovcharenko =

Russian graphic artist and architect

Gennady Gennagyevich Ovcharenko
- Russian: Геннадий Геннадьевич Овчаренко
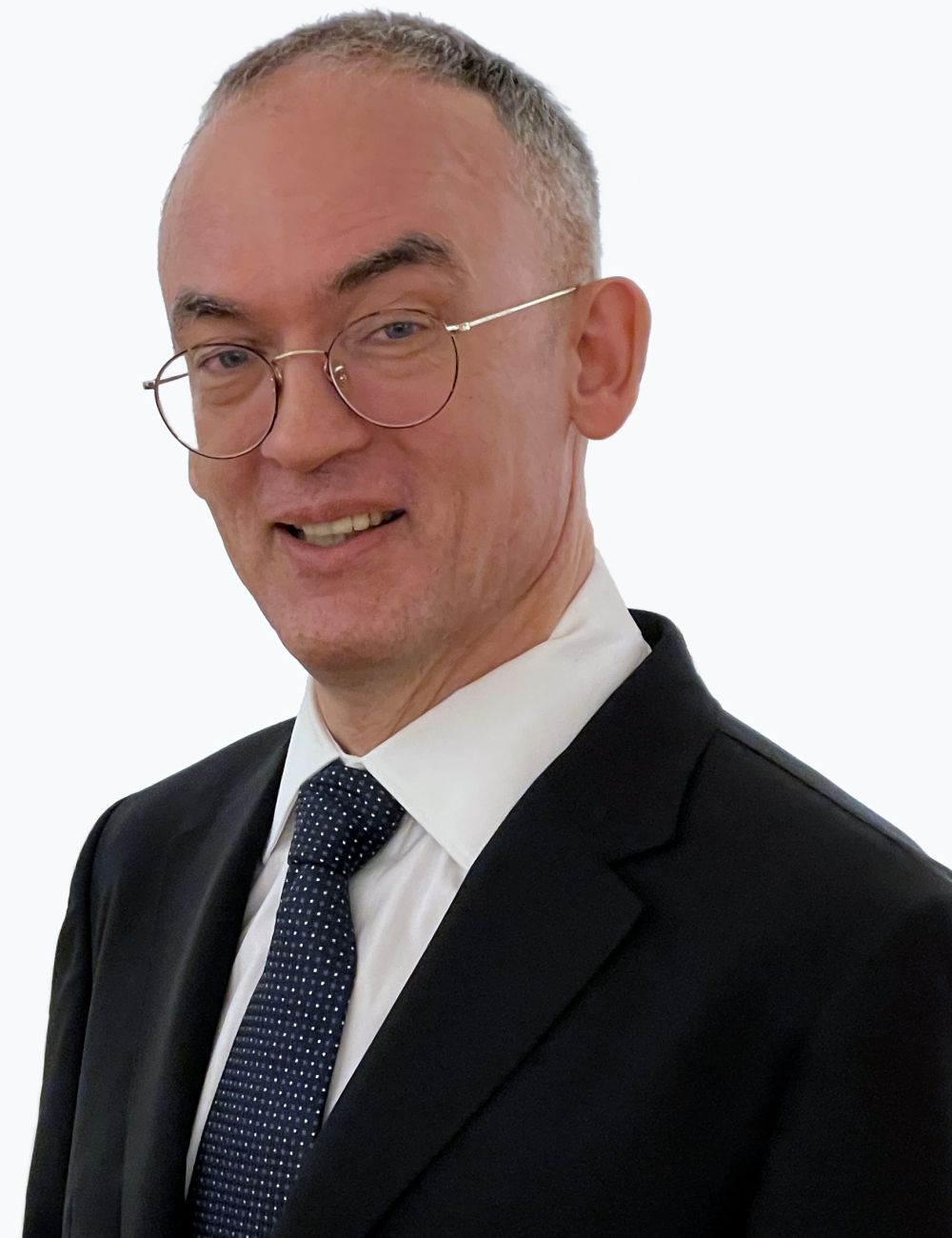
- Born: 11 August 1964; Moscow, USSR
- Education: Moscow Architectural Institute
- Known for: Drawing, painting
- Movement: Realist art, Architectural drawing
- Awards: Union of Architects of the USSR award, 1990
- Patrons: Russian Academy of Arts

Gennady Ovcharenko (Russian: Генна́дий Генна́дьевич Овчаре́нко; born in Moscow, August 11, 1964) is a Russian graphic artist and architectural drawing professional. He has been a teacher of drawing at the Moscow Architectural Institute (since 1989), Associate Professor of the Department of Drawing (1999), a member of the Union of Architects since 1991, and has authored books and teaching manuals on academic drawing. He received the award of the Union of Architects of the USSR in 1990.

== Biography ==
Born on August 11, 1964, in Moscow, USSR.

He studied at Moscow schools # 46, # 26 (with English language as a subject), in 1981 he graduated from Moscow high school # 856, at the same time as Natalya Vetlitskaya.

In 1981-1986 he studied at the Moscow Architectural Institute.

In 1986-1987 he was in military service in the Soviet Army, as drawing designer at the General Staff of the Soviet Armed Forces in Moscow.

He began working as an architect at the Central Research Institute of Urban Planning Design in Moscow.

He has been teaching at the Department of Drawing at the Moscow Architectural Institute since 1989. Associate professor (1999) on classical academic and architectural drawing.

He specialises in drawing in the architectural profession and in architectural landscape composition.

His creative activity mainly includes drawing and graphics and main styles such as landscape, portrait, fantasy and horror, as well as computer game design.

== Membership ==
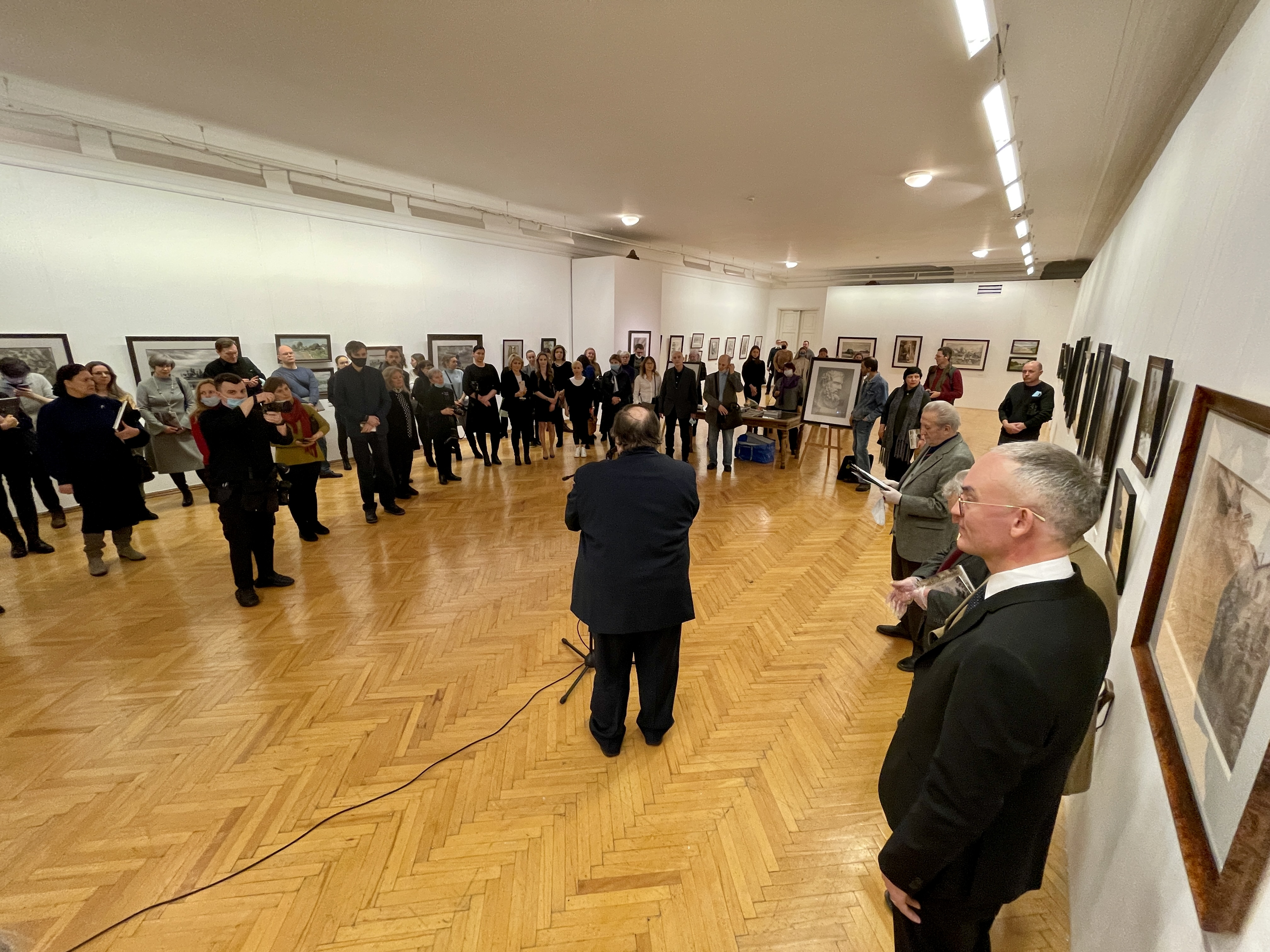
Personal exhibition, 2021

Membership in Russian art societies:

- Union of Architects of Russia (1991)
- Creative Union of Artists of Russia
- Russian National Union of crayon painting of the International Association of Pastel Societies (IAPS).

In 1990 he received the award of the Union of Architects of the USSR for young drawing professionals.

== Exhibitions ==
Since the 1990s he took part in the following exhibitions: Central House of Architects and Central House of Artists. Regular exhibitions of graphic and painting works of Moscow Architectural Institute teachers in the Gallery on Kuznetsky Most.

Personal exhibitions:

- Museum of Ex-libris and Miniature Books of the International Union of Book Lovers, on Kuznetsky Most.
- Russian Academy of Arts: Academic drawing in architectural education: Gennady Ovcharenko, Moscow Architectural Institute (2021).

Work styles and critics:

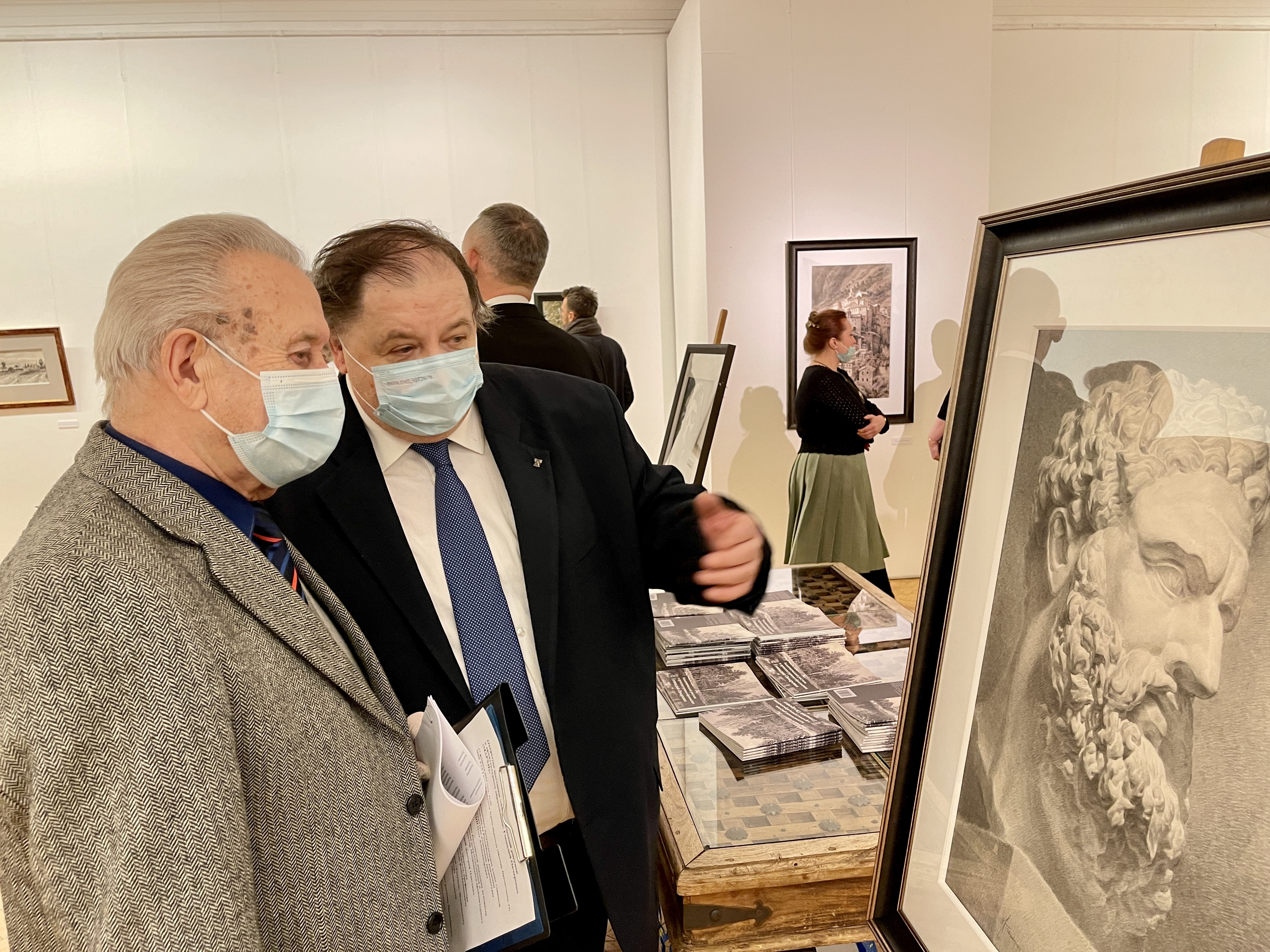
Art Academic style

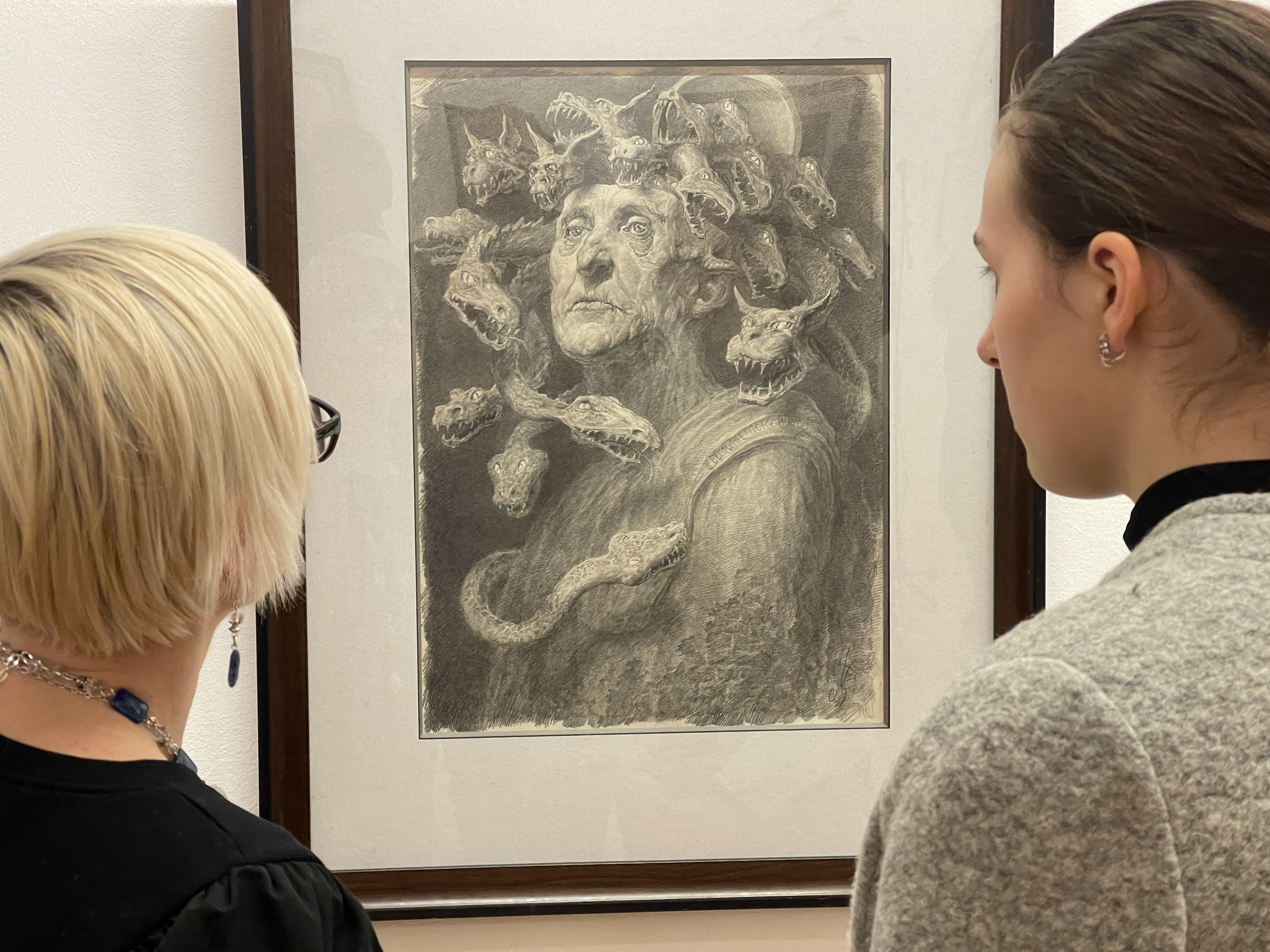
Horror drawing style

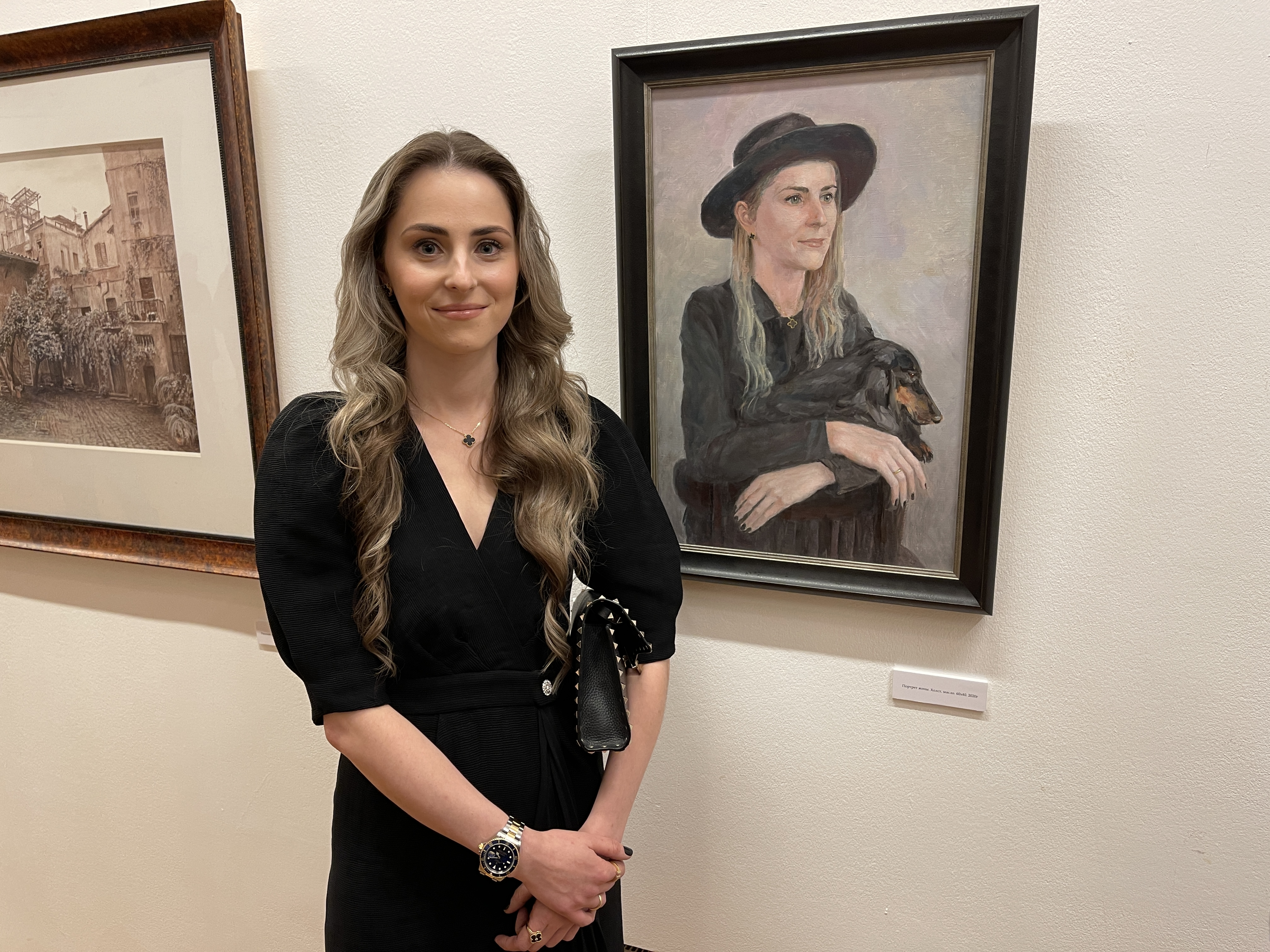
Portret

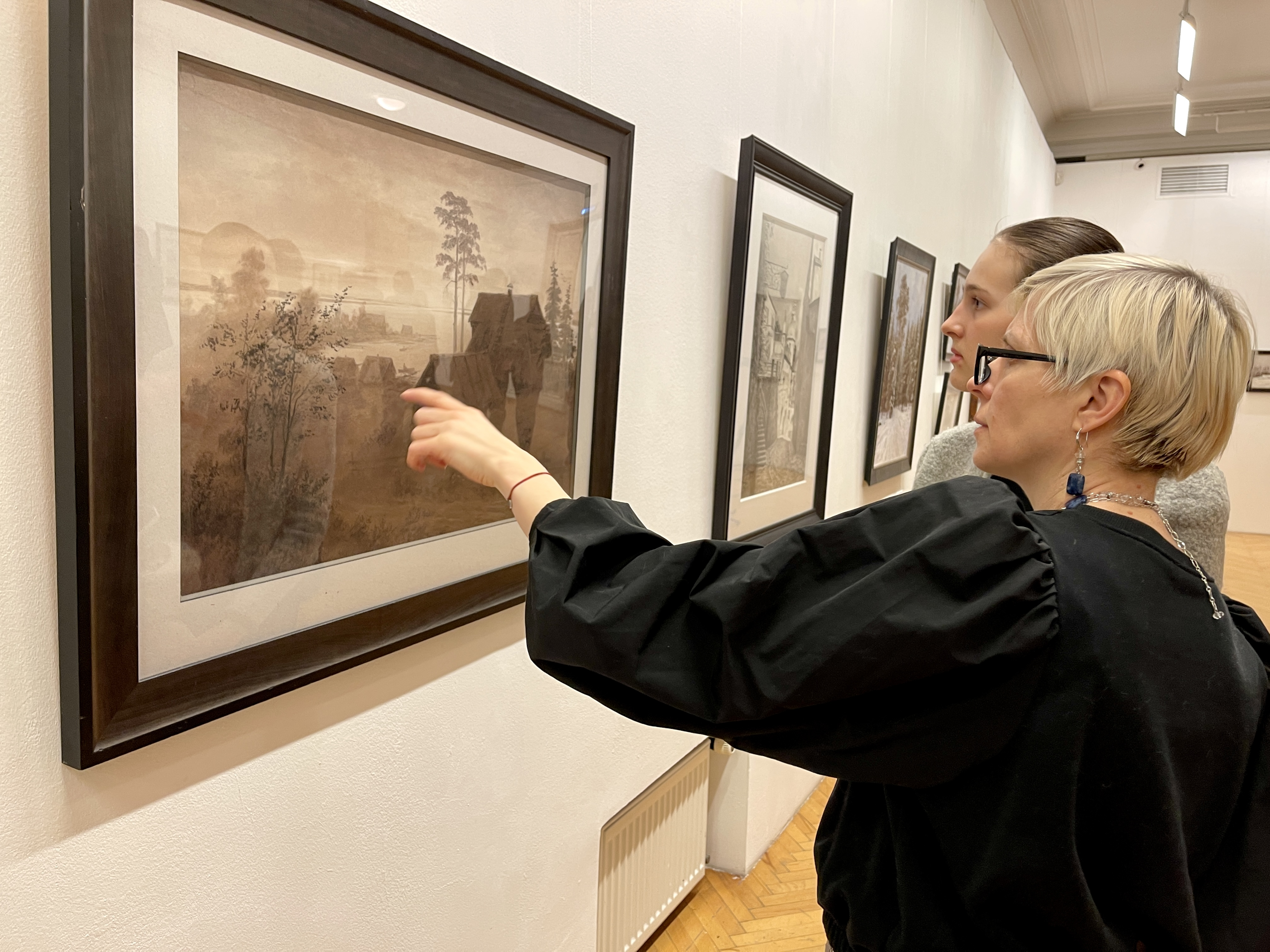
Other paintings

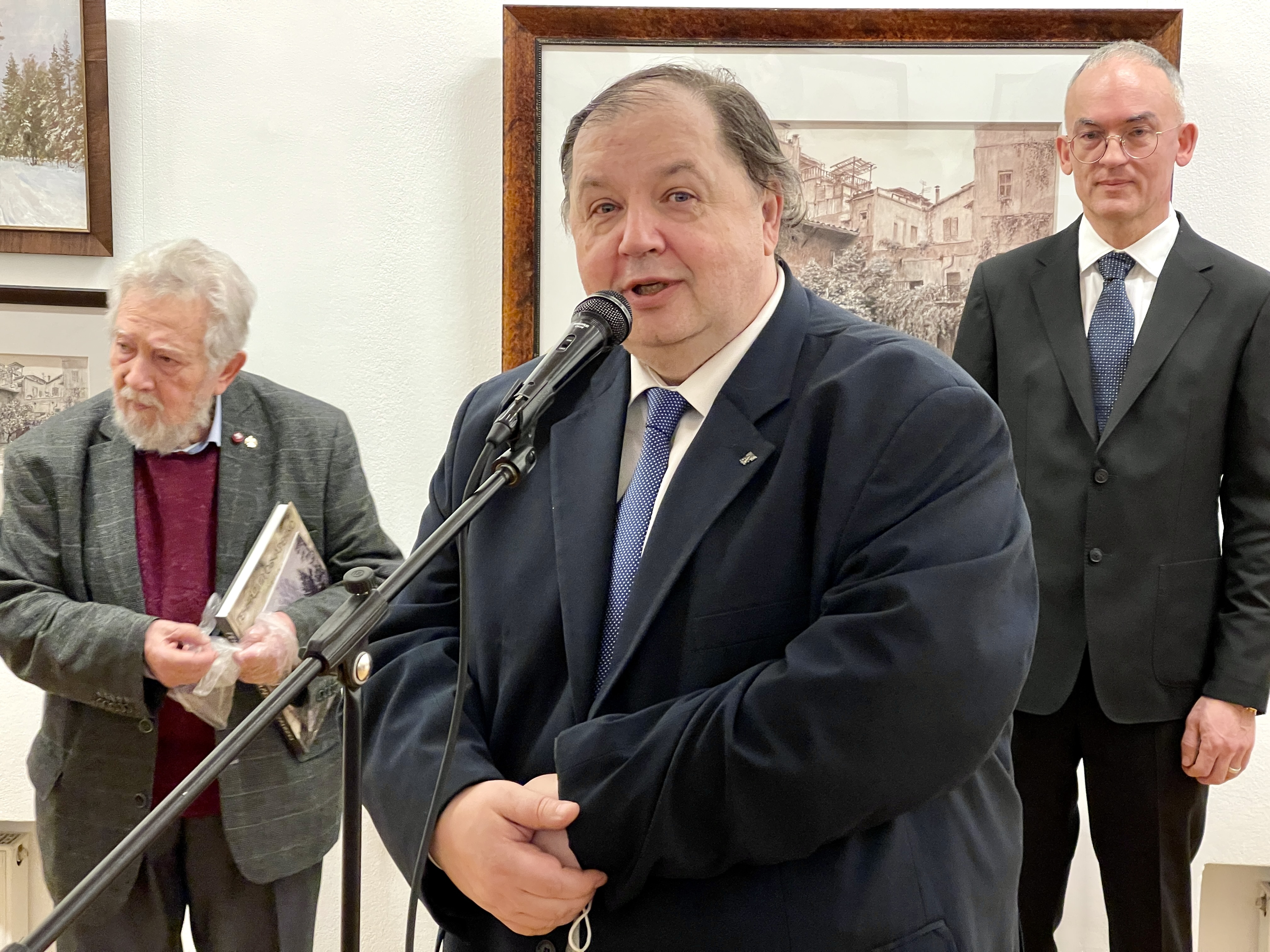
Personal exhibition opening by D. Shvidkovsky

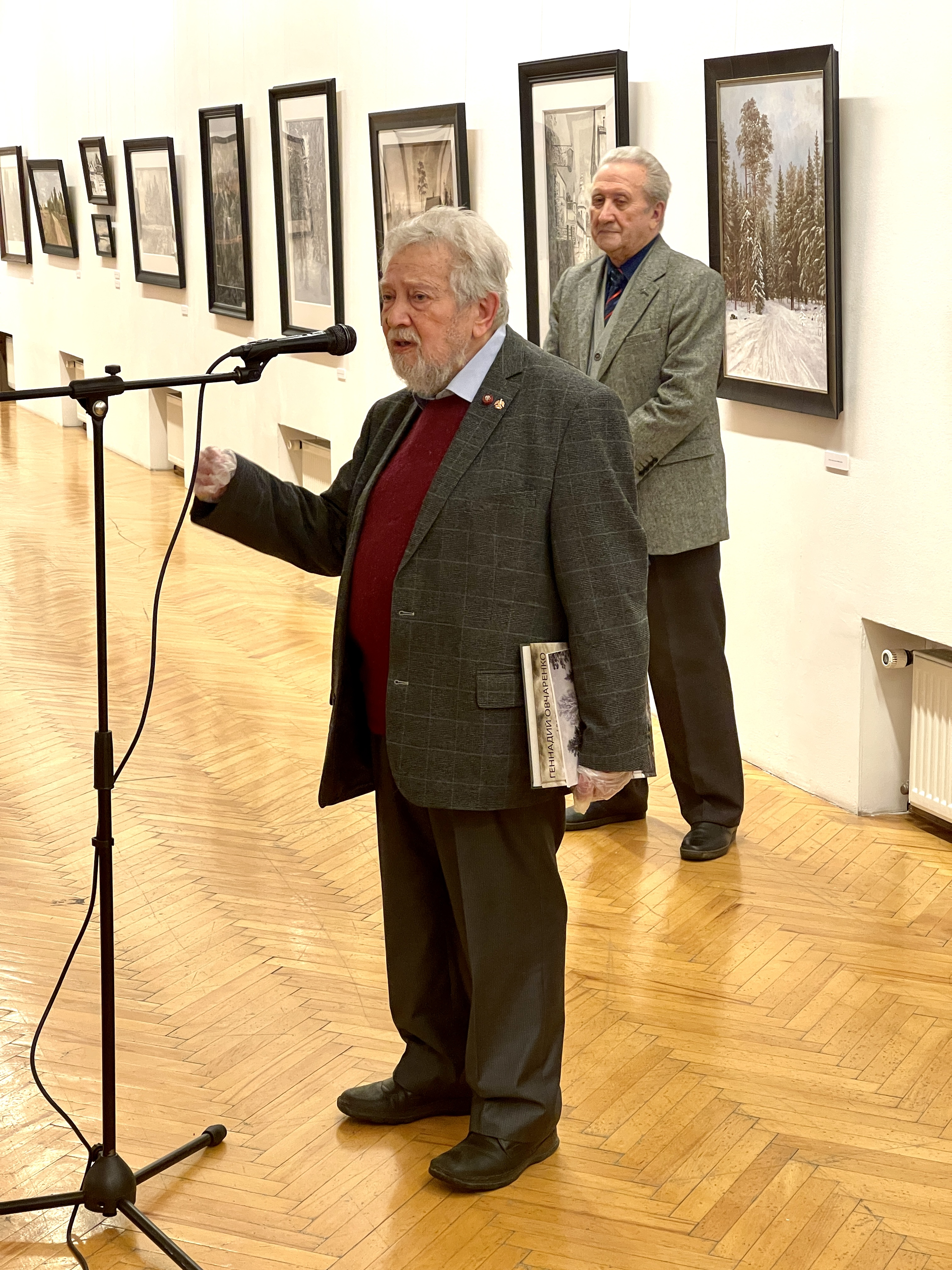
Art critics by A. Zolotov

== Bibliography ==
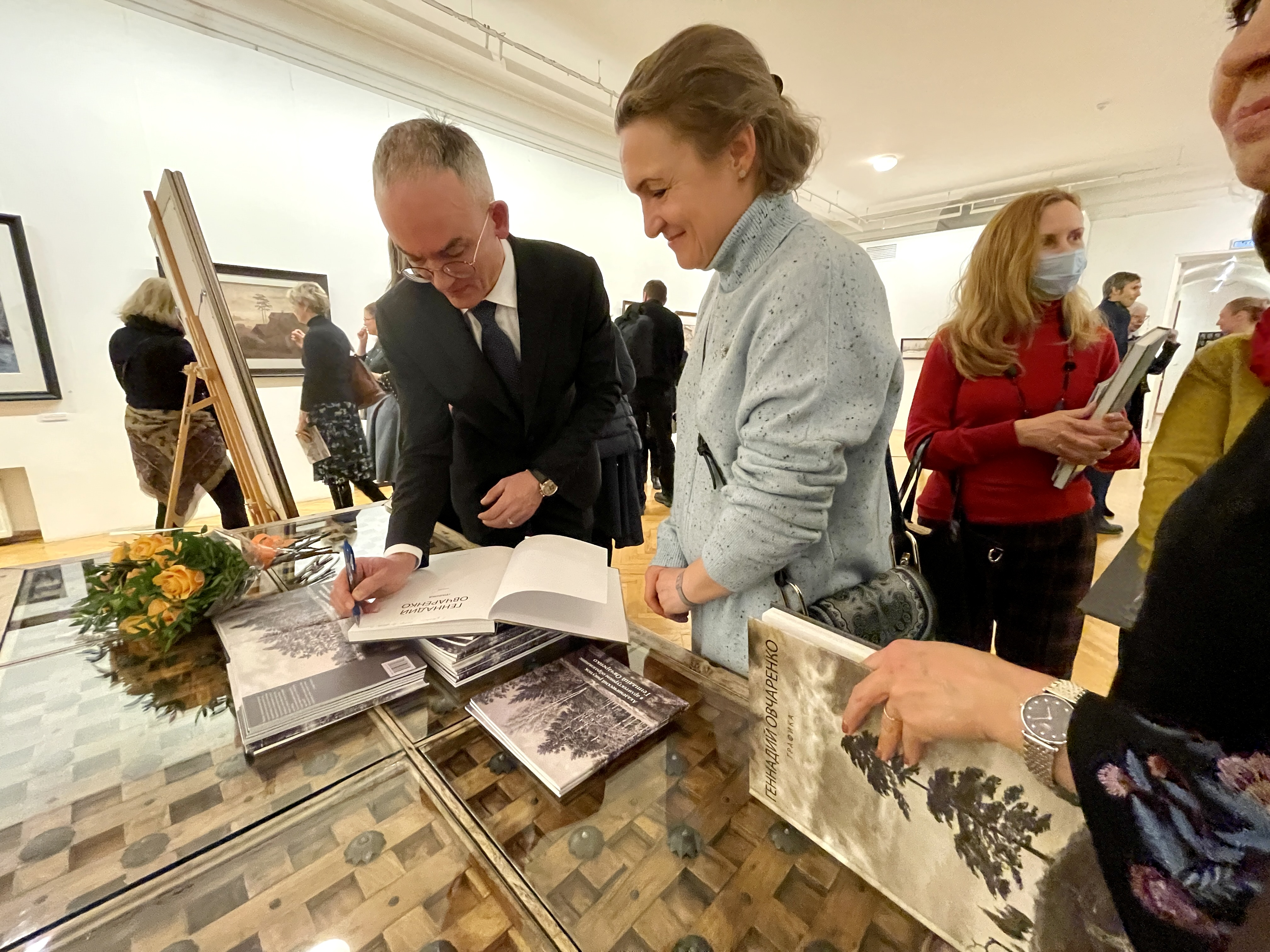
With his books, 2021

Main publications (in Russian language):

- Drawing without errors. Useful advice, catalog of works / G. Ovcharenko, D. Pozhidaev. Moscow, 2012. 124 p.
- Graphics: catalog / Gennady Ovcharenko. Moscow, 2018. 231 p.
- Multimedia drawing manual (on two CDs, 2004. DVD, 2013)
- Drawing: Pre-university training course for architects and designers, 2006
- Study programs of the Drawing dept, Drawing. 2013.
- Catalogs of teachers of the Drawing dept, Moscow Architectural Institute.

== See also ==
- List of Russian artists
