= Stanislav Zelvensky =

Russian film critic and journalist

- Born: Stanislav Igorevich Zelvensky; December 27, 1978 (age 47); Leningrad, USSR
- Occupation: film critic
- Years active: 2003 — present

Stanislav Igorevich Zelvensky (Russian: Станисла́в И́горевич Зельве́нский; born in 1978) is a Russian cinema critic, journalist, and columnist of Afisha magazine.

== Biography ==
Stanislav Zelvensky was born in Leningrad in 1978. He is a graduate of the St Petersburg Classical Gymnasium and SPBU alumni. He took a postgraduate course at the Russian Institute of Art History. As critic and columnist, he contributed to Kommersant, Seans, Expert, and other magazines. In 2003-2006 he held the position of Deputy Editor of Afisha. As an author, he contributed to ‘The Newest History of Russian Cinema: 1986-2000’ almanac.

In 2006, Zelvensky played a small part in Zhest', a psychological thriller directed by Denis Neinmand.

In 2013, a romantic comedy Bad Case based on Zelvensky's script was directed by Konstantin Murzenko. Though the film was shown only at the Window to Europe Film Festival in Vyborg, it was praised by critics and described as elegant, melancholic and deeply touching.

By 2014, Zelvensly became one of the most influential cinema critics in Russian media world.

In 2021, Zelvensky released a book about Roman Polanski. The book in detail analyzes all movies directed by Polanski and covers all his signature themes, motives and topics.

== Favorite films ==
As voted at the British Film Institute website, his favourite films are:

- Brief Encounter (1945)
- The Conversation (1974)
- Crimes and Misdemeanors (1989)
- The Dead (1987)
- Eyes Wide Shut (1999)
- Fingers (1978)
- The Killing of a Chinese Bookie (1976)
- The King of Comedy (1982)
- The Life and Death of Colonel Blimp (1943)
- The Tenant (1976)
