= Marianna Tavrog =

Soviet-Russian documentary film director

Marianna Yelizarovna Tavrog Таврог, Марианна Елизаровна
- Born: January 16, 1921; Taganrog, Russia
- Died: June 11, 2006 (aged 85); Moscow, Russia
- Occupation: film director
- Years active: 1960-2006

Marianna Yelizarovna Tavrog (Russian: Таврог, Марианна Елизаровна) (1921-2006) was a Soviet Russian documentary film director, Honored Artist of Russian Federation.

== Biography ==
Born into a Jewish family on January 16, 1921, in the city of Taganrog, studied in Taganrog. Entered the Teachers' College in Moscow, and after the start of World War II had to evacuate to Alma-Ata and entered the VGIK, which was evacuated to Alma-Ata in 1941. Among her teachers were Leonid Trauberg and Grigory Kozintsev. After VGIK returned from evacuation to Moscow, Tavrog attended classes by Lev Kuleshov and Aleksandra Khokhlova.

== Filmography ==
The main topics of Tavrog's documentaries were literature and art.

- 1960 — Самуил Маршак
- 1969 — Чукоккала
- 1970 — Михаил Светлов
- 1972 — Ритм стиха
- 1972 — Один Тамм
- 1977 — Мой дом открыт
- 1977 — Лариса Рейснер
- 1979 — Художник сказочных чудес
- 1981 — Портрет
- 1982 — Мне 100 лет
- 1983 — Старые мастера («Centrnauchfilm»)
- 1985 — Ради жизни на Земле
- 1985 — Нащокинский домик
- 1985 — Жизнь цвета
- 1986 — От дедов к внукам
- 1987 — Первый декабрист
- 1988 — Страницы из жизни идеалиста
- 1996 — Театр Марка Шагала
- 1996 — Сентиментальный гротеск, или художники еврейского театра
- 1999 - Евгений Онегин. Глава Х.
