= Alexei Makarov =

Russian actor of theatre and cinema (born 1972)

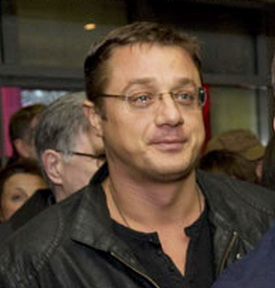
- Makarov in 2009
- Born: Alexei Valerevich Makarov; 15 February 1972 (age 54); Omsk, Russian SFSR, USSR
- Occupation: Actor
- Years active: 1996-present

Alexei Valerevich Makarov (Russian: Алексе́й Вале́рьевич Мака́ров; 15 February 1972) is a Russian actor of theatre and cinema. Born 1972 in Omsk in family of actors Valeriy Makarov and Lyubov Polishchuk.

== Biography ==
After high school, at the second attempt, he entered the Russian University of Theatre Arts - GITIS (rate of P. Chomsky)

In 1994, after graduation, he worked in the theater Mossovet. By that time he already had experience in the films Check, and The Rifleman of the Voroshilov Regiment. He would go on to star in the film Countdown.

He appeared in the first season of ice show contest Ice Age.

== Filmography ==
- The Rifleman of the Voroshilov Regiment (1998)
- In Motion (2002)
- Moscow Saga (2004)
- Countdown (2004)
- The Three Musketeers (2013)
- About Love (2015)
- Story of One Appointment (2018)

== External links and references ==
- Черновик Андрея
- Сайт Алексея Макарова
- Алексей Макаров не хочет прослыть суперменом
- Сайт, посвящённый актёру Алексею Макарову
