= Sergei Ryabov =

Russian animator (born 1977)

Sergei Ryabov Серге́й Ря́бов
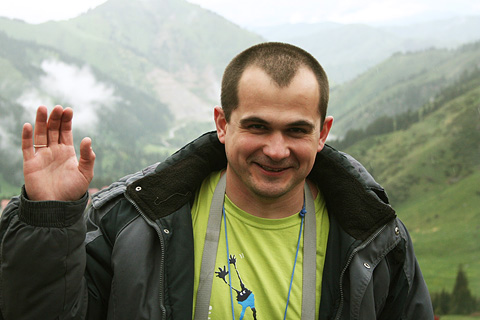
- Born: 17 November 1977 (age 48); Schelkovo, Moscow Region, Soviet Union
- Occupations: director, artist, animator, writer
- Writing career
- Genre: Animation
- Notable work: Rybka

Sergei Ryabov (Russian: Серге́й Ря́бов; born November 17, 1977) is a Russian film director, artist, and animator.

== Biography ==
Sergei Ryabov was born in 1977 in Schelkovo, Russian Federation. In 1995 Ryabov has finished the Moscow Art-College and has received the first profession—artist-jeweller. From 1995–2001 he studied in the Gerasimov All-Russian State Institute of Cinematography (the studio of Sergey Alimov) where has made an animation student's project Home Alone (2.5 min.). Having defended the diploma (Pinocchio by Carlo Collodi), he had worked as an animator for some years in different studios of Moscow. In 2006 Sergei Ryabov created at home the animation stand, on which he has shot a first film Rybka independently.

== Filmography ==
=== Director ===
- 2000 – Home Alone
- 2007 – Rybka

=== Screenwriter ===
- 2000 – Home Alone
- 2007 – Rybka

=== Art director ===
- 2000 – Home Alone
- 2007 – Rybka

=== Artist ===
- 2000 – Home Alone
- 2007 – Rybka

== Prizes and awards ==
- 2000 – XX International Film Festival of Gerasimov All-Russian State Institute of Cinematography – Prize for the best student animation film (The film Home Alone)
- 2007 – XII Open Russian Animation Film Festival in Suzdal – Special prize (The film Rybka)
- 2007 – XVII International Film Forum «Gold Knight» – The Silver Knight prize (The film Rybka)
- 2007 – XII Russian Festival of Visual Arts «Orlenok» – The Diploma (The film Rybka)
- 2007 – XII Moscow International Children Animation Festival «Gold Fish» – Prize for the best cartoon film for children (The film Rybka)
- 2007 – IV Orthodox Children Film Festival «Effulgent Angel» – The Diploma (The film Rybka)
- 2007 – International Animated Festival «Animayovka» – Special prize (The film Rybka)
- 2007 – International Film Festival for Children and Youth Audience «Listopadik» – Prize for the best debut (The film Rybka)
- 2008 – III International Sretensky Orthodox Film Festival «Vstrecha» – Prize for the best animation film Crystal Candlestick (The film Rybka)
- 2008 – XV Contest of Student Films and Debuts «St. Anna» – The Diploma (The film Rybka)
- 2008 – International Film Festival «Nueva Mirada» for Children and Youth – Golden Kite to the best short film for children (The film Rybka)
- 2008 – Sapporo Short Fest – Prize for best children short; Children's Choice Silver Award (The film Rybka)
- 2008 – International Orthodox Film Festival «Pokrov» – Prize for the best animation film; The Diploma (The film Rybka)
- 2008 – V China International Animation and Digital Arts Festival – Special distinction award in short film category (The film Rybka)
- 2008 – International Festival of Audiovisual Production for Children and Adolescents «Kolibri» – Special Mention of the Jury in the Animation Category (The film Rybka)
- 2008 – Bradford Animation Festival – Award for best film for children (The film Rybka)
- 2009 – Festival der Nationen – Ebenseer Bären in Silber (The film Rybka)
- 2009 – Animae Caribe Animation & New Media Festival – Most Outstanding Animation (The film Rybka)
