= Ikiru (director) =

Russian-American film director

Ikiru a.k.a. Ikiru Genzai or IKR1 (born in Moscow, USSR in 1980 as Daniel Nemagiev, Даниил Немагиев) is a Russian-American film director.

== Biography ==
Ikiru grew up in both Moscow and New York City's Lower East Side. Having obtained a Communication Arts degree in 1999, he assumed the alias Ikiru (Japanese: "to live") Genzai (Japanese: "now") in homage to Akira Kurosawa film Ikiru and a character in it. Under this alias he became a member of several conceptual, politically-conscious graphic design collectives such as the Pencilninja Company and GTS (Group for Tactical Subversion).

From 2003 to 2009 Ikiru attended the Deutsche Film und Fernsehakademie Berlin (The German Film and Television Academy) in Berlin, Germany.

Adhering to a 60's-70s auteur tradition, Ikiru's work creatively explores and interprets social ailments from an underdog perspective.

== Filmography ==
Year	Title	Original Title	Format
2004	Polish Alligator vs. Bratwurst Robot		Short
2006	Rabbit and Luck	Кролик и Счастье	Short
2008	Ivan Borisoviç		Feature
2010	44. I'm'a get my cousins	44. Ich hol' meine Cousins	Feature
2011	Ralf a.k.a. Sex in the Desert	Ralf. Sex in der Wüste	Doc. Feature
2013	Freestyler		Web Series
2014	Moscow Mutiny		Doc. Feature
