= Angelina Nikonova =

Russian filmmaker

- Ангелина Никонова
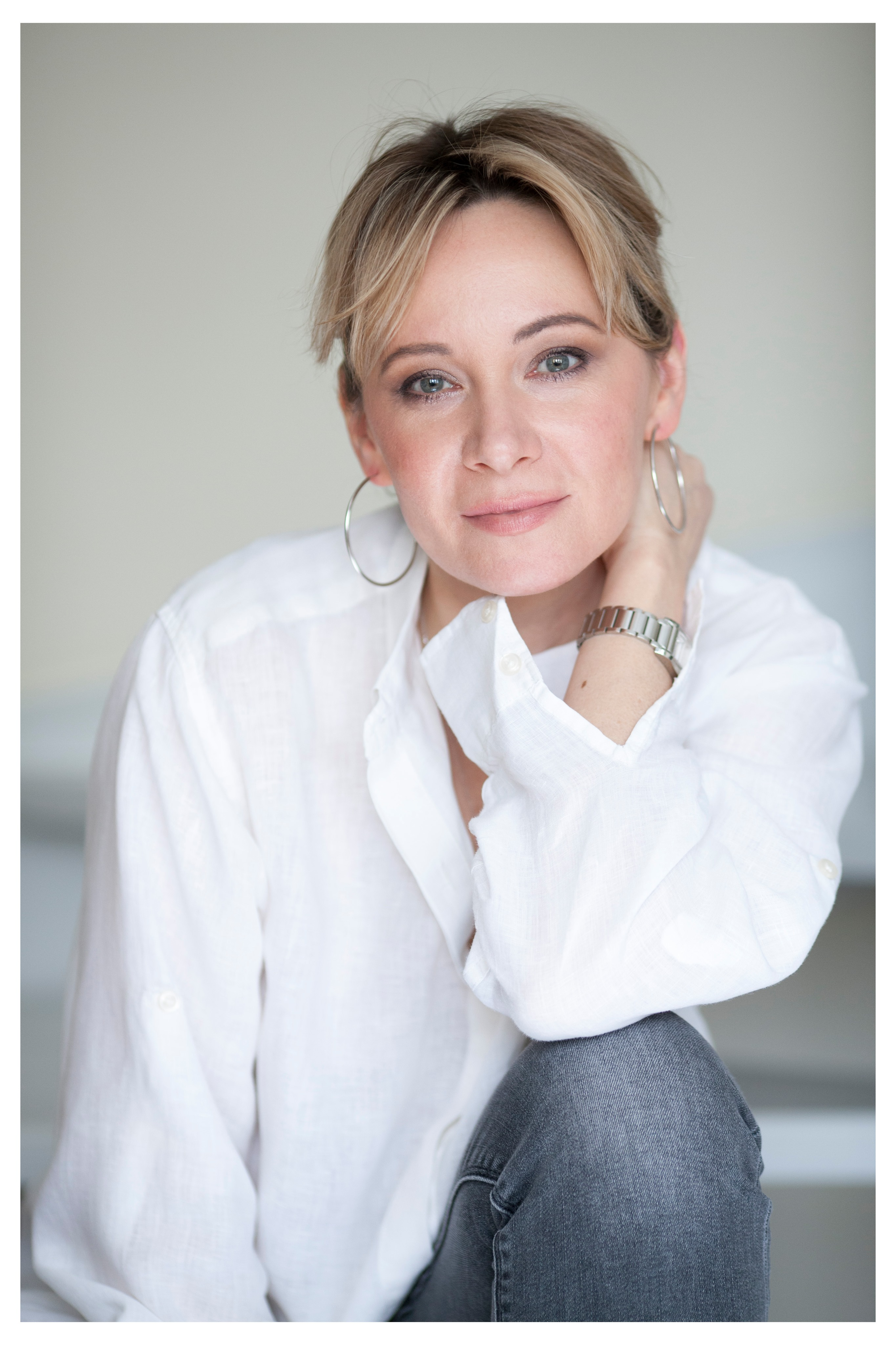
- Nikonova in 2011
- Born: Angelina Yurevna Fedoseenko; February 27, 1976 (age 50); Rostov-on-Don, RSFSR, USSR
- Citizenship: Soviet Union (until 1991); Russian
- Occupation: Filmmaker

Angelina Yurevna Nikonova (Russian: Ангелина Юрьевна Никонова; born February 27, 1976) is a Russian filmmaker, script writer and film producer.

== Biography ==
Angelina Nikonova was born in Rostov-on-Don, Russian RSFSR, Soviet Union (now Russia). She dreamed about film directing since her childhood. However, the situation with national film production in Russia is complicated, especially for a woman. As Angelina notices: ‘Women as film directors are rarely trusted’. Moreover, Russian viewer is reluctant to national product. People rather go to watch Hollywood production, than a film made in Russia. However, Angelina did not give up on her dream. She applied to All-Russian State University of Cinematography named after S. A. Gerasimov (aka VGIK). However, as she claims later, it was easier to immigrate to USA than to get accepted in VGIK. In 2001 she graduated from New York School of Visual Arts, with major in Film and Video.

== Career ==
In 2011 Angelina Nikonova and her partner Olga Dihovichnaya shot a feature film Twilight Portrait (Portret v symerkah), using a simple reflective camera due to the low budget. However, the film had a great success and won a number of prizes, including international price for best debut 2011 on Warsaw International Film Festival. For the film, Angelina worked as a director, a script writer, a producer, a location manager, casting director, make-up artists, and art director. At the same time, Angelina Nikonova worked as an organizer of International Film Festival 2morrow/Zavtra.

== Filmography ==
- 2000 – “Isosceles” - a short film, graduate work.
- 2005 – “Point of Return” – documentary, director.
- 2011 - "Twilight Portrait" - director, scriptwriter, producer.
- 2014 - "Velkam khom" - director, scriptwriter.

== Twilight Portrait ==
Twilight Portrait (aka Portret v Sumerkakh) received its world premiere at the 2011 Kinotavr Open Russian Film Festival, where it became a subject of understandable controversy among both critics and audiences.

At first it was shot on Canon EOS 5D Mark II, borrowed from a friend of Nikonova. It was shot during 29 days in Rostov-on-Don, with 5-6 people crew, consisting of friends and former classmate from New York, who was invited as a cameraman. The movie used 80 characters, 50 locations. At first, the script was written by Olga Dihovichnaya in two days. Later, it was edited by Angelina Nikonova, as the drama needed some ‘light’, as Nikonova notices in the interview.

== Awards and nominations ==
- 2011 – Twilight Portrait – Kinotavr Open Russian Film Festival, best cinematography, Eben Bull.
- 2011 – Twilight Portrait – Reykjavik International Film Festival, grand prize.
- 2011 – Twilight Portrait – Warsaw International Film Festival, winner of 1-2 competition, ‘For the original approach and courage in showing the true situation of women in a world in which they turn to be stronger than the strongest man’.
- 2011 – Twilight Portrait – 19th Honfleur Russian Film Festival, Best first film and Best screen play, Olga Dichovichnaya, Angelina Nikonova.
- 2011 – Twilight Portrait – Annual award of the Guild of Historians of Cinema and Film Critics in Moscow, Best first film.
- 2011 – Twilight Portrait – 21st FilmFestival Cottbus – Festival of East European Cinema, Best Film.

== Bibliography ==
1. Film School of MacGaffin, interview with Angelina Nikonova, 19, March, 2013.
2. School of Slander, interview with Angelina Nikonova and Olga Dichovichnaya, 26, October, 2012.
3. Pilipenko G. "A Dog" and a skirt of director Angelina Nikinova, 22, December, 2011.
4. Proletarskij A., Angelina Nikonova: Hope in the end of a drama I call "Air", 1, February, 2012.
5. Dan Fainaru "Twilight Portrait", 16 November 2011.
6. Pilipenko G., Twilight Portrait: Made in Rostov!, 7, April, 2012.
7. Birgit Beumers, Nancy Condee, Kinotavr 2011: Russian Cinema as a State of Mind, KinoKultura: Issue 34 (2011).
