= Ruslan Vitryanyuk =

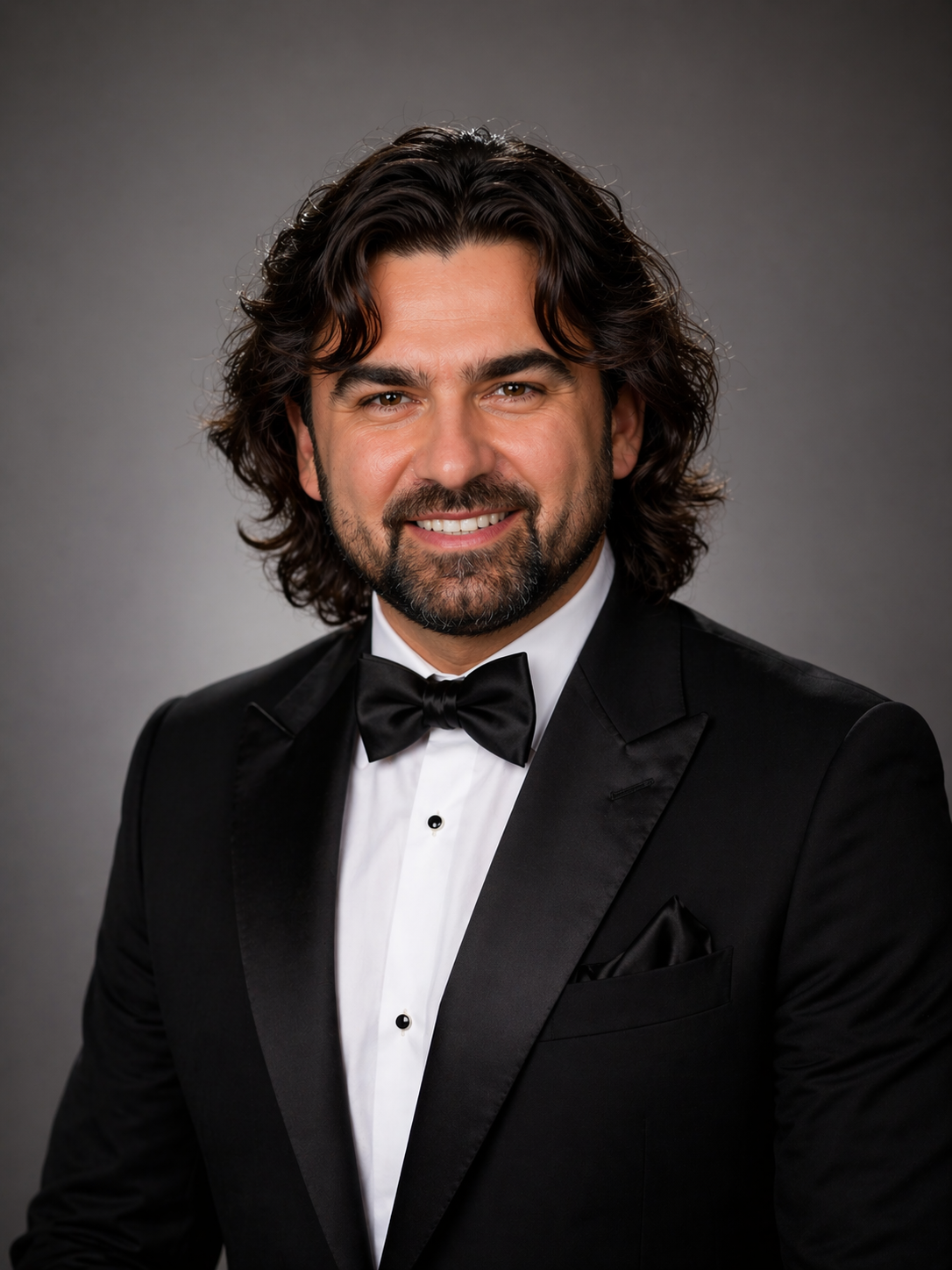
- Ruslan Vitryanyuk in a formal studio portrait, wearing a black tuxedo and bow tie.
- Born: February 28, 1973 (age 53); Borisov, USSR
- Education: Russian Academy of Foreign Trade
- Occupations: Producer, film maker, actor
- Years active: 1995–present

Ruslan Vitryanyuk (Russian: Руслан Владимирович Витрянюк), born February 28, 1973, is a producer, film maker, actor, Member of Russian Guild of Producers, Member of Ukrainian Guild of Producers.

He is the founder and president of Los Angeles–based Golden Bridge Entertainment and Russian foundation "Stars of the Motherland" (Foundation that supports Culture, Arts, Science and Sports). Ruslan is also the creator and producer of Russian Film Festival in Valence. Ruslan is best known for his works with Pierre Richard, Annie Girardot, Orlando Bloom, Djimon Hounsou, Catherine Deneuve, and Thomas Anders

== Education ==
Ruslan holds his Bachelor's degree in Psychology, Master's degree in Marketing and Advertising. He also has Ph.D degree. He’s an author of the dissertation “National Interests of Modern day Russia within international interests: A political-psychological aspect”

In his work, Vitryanyuk concludes that: “often government interests oppose national and public interests of the civil society”.

Also, Vityranyuk notes, that part of the russian society don’t see their futures as part of the Federation.

“This is not only a consequence of some historical predestination or grievances against the past, but also the result of disagreement with the current policy of the central government, because it does not yet optimally express the interests of society in all their diversity”.

== Career ==
Ruslan started his career as an executive in "Photo" magazine. During his work at "Photo" magazine he got introduced to Stas Namin who had a great photo collection of his own. Ruslan proposed to organize photo exhibition for Stas that turn out to be a great success. Impressed by Ruslan's organizational skills, Stas Namin, who gained a cult figure status as one of the founders of indigenous Russian rock music, offered Ruslan his first job as producer. Ruslan gained tremendous experience working with Stas on numerous projects in The Stas Namin Centre.

In 1998 Ruslan founded "Stars of the Motherland" foundation that supports culture, arts, science and sports. This organization produced numerous gala events in partnership with JSA for various international pop music stars in the Kremlin, Red Square, and Carnegie Hall.

In 1998 Ruslan met Sergey Kalvarskiy, TEFI award winner in "Producer of the Year" nomination (Equivalent to a Golden Globe Award). Starting in 2003 they worked with all major Russian pop and rock stars producing their music videos. Ruslan founded "Production Promotion Pictures", his first production company, in 2003 and produced two films the same year. His first work with famous Russian movie director Ivan Solovov, Slova i muzyka was critically acclaimed. His second work was his first TV series project, Nadezhda ukhodit posledney was purchased by one of the most popular Russian channels CTC.

In the period of time between 2005 and 2011 Ruslan partnered with Kinoprom, Top Line Production, and A-1 Kino Video. He produced the following films and TV series "Polnyy vperyod!", Parni iz stali, "Karusel", "Stealing Tarantino", "Ya dozhdus", Countdown, "Mechtat ne vredno", "Kod apokalipsisa", Zabava, "My iz budushchego 2", Dyuymovochka, "Horror Which Is Always with You", and many others.

In 2011 Ruslan moved to Los Angeles, CA and founded "Golden Bridge Entertainment".

In 2022, after the start of the Russian invasion of Ukraine, Ruslan Vitryanyuk never spoke in support of the Kremlin's policy, on the contrary, same time ago he became the author of the "Unbroken" project, by analogy with one of the main narratives of the Ukrainian authorities today ("neskoreni"), which tells stories about strong people.

=== Political activity ===
In June 2023, he came back from the USA to his hometown of Ulyanovsk with the goal of solving multiple political issues. Moreover, Vitryanyuk carried out a meeting with ex-minister of public health Pavel Degtyar.

Vitryanyuk stepped up his political activities against the backdrop of disagreement with the policy of the current Russian authorities regarding Ukraine, which led to the international isolation of the Russian Federation.

Vityranyuk’s father - is a major-general, Vladimir Vitryanyuk, who is one of the initiators for the appearance of “Just Russia - Patriots”, which was joined by Vitryanyuks party “Patriots of Russia”.

The new political force also includes a colleague of Ruslan Vitryanyuk, a well-known television journalist, the author of a program on the Dozhd TV channel, Zakhar Prilepin.

The “Just Russia - Patriots” party, which unites the young political elite, well-known artists, including those in the West, enjoys the support of the Russian generals, advocates the renewal of power in Russia, starting from the regions.

=== Notable Works with Stas Namin ===
- 1997 – The World International Festival on the Red Square (concert) and Teatralnaya Square (carnival)in Moscow timed for the city's 850th Anniversary celebrations, featuring ethnic groups from Japan, Scotland, Brazil, India, Britain, Israel, the Palestinian Autonomy, Bulgaria and other countries
- 1997 – Michael Legrand concert in Moscow
- 1997 – Chuck Berry concert in Moscow
- 1998 – "Rhythm'n'Blues Cafe" club and restaurant.
- 1999 – Organization of 200 anniversary of Pushkin's birthday in Carnegie Hall
- 1999 – Musical "Hair"
- 2001 – A 30-year Jubilee of the Stas Namin Group "The Flowers" at the Central Concert Hall "Russia".

== Main Achievements ==
- 1995 – Ruslan Vitryanyuk opens company "Russian Stars"
- 1998 – Organization of the Foundation "Stars of the Motherland" (The Foundation of Support of Culture, Arts, Science and Sports). Currently Ruslan is the President of the Foundation
- 2000 – Organization of the project "Park of the Stars". It was the project where 2000 famous people planted trees with their names. Awards for this project: Festival "Stylish Things", Awarded "Best Project of the year" for the Project "Park of the Stars"; Magazine "Faces. Idols of Russia", Award "Producer of the Year" for "Park of the Stars"; Russian National Olympus, Award for the Achievements in Culture, Arts, Science, and Sports for "Park of the Stars"
- 2000 – Ruslan is a producer and the author of original idea of the project "Stars which never dim"
- 2001 – Ruslan was a judge for "Ovation", a Russian National Music Award in the field of entertainment and popular music, Ovation Award
- 2002 – Judge for "Pearls of Russia" under UNESCO, Beauty pageant.
- 2003 – Member of judges in TEFI (Award of Russian Academy of Television).
- 2003 – Ruslan Vitryanyuk starts working with the TV producer Sergey Kalvarskiy, academician of the Russian TV Academy, nominee for "Producer of the Year", and a TEFI award winner (Equivalent to America's Golden Globes). Together they worked on more than 20 music videos for the most famous Russian singers.
- 2003 – Ruslan Vitryanyuk opens the company "Production Promotion Pictures"
- 2004 – Ruslan Vitryanyuk begins work as a producer with the company "Top Line Production". Together they produced many famous and high-budget films.
- 2004 – Ruslan Vitryanyuk begins work as a producer with the company "Kinoprom"
- 2005 – Ruslan was a judge for Russian Festival "Astra" of Fashion and Style
- 2005 to Present Time - Producer and organizer of Russian Fashion Week. Ruslan created and launched the First Face Model Awards inside Fashion Week (2005–2010). Djimon Hounsou was an honored guest for Russian Fashion Week in 2008.
- 2006 – Festival de Cannes, Premiere, Opening Night, film "20 nights and one rainy day", http://www.festival-cannes.fr/
- 2006 – Organization of Festival of Russian Cinema in Valence. General producer and president of judges.
- 2006 – Festival of Russian Cinema in France, Premiere "Parisians", Opening night
- 2007 – Festival of Alla Surikova in Astrakhan "Smile, Russia". Awards for the film "Parisians": "Best Director" and "Bright Acting Ensemble" Улыбнись, Россия!
- 2007 – Ruslan Vitryanyuk was included in the list of notable people in Russia ("Who is Who" in Russia)
- 2007 – Ruslan Vitryanyuk continues work with Sergey Kalvarskiy. Together they work on the project "Minute of Glory" (Минута славы). "Minute of Glory" is the Russian version of "America's Got Talent" and "Britain's Got Talent"
- 2008 – Ruslan was awarded with the Order of the 1st Degree from Moscow Government for "The Achievements and Investments in Culture and Arts"
- 2008 – Organization of the 60th anniversary of Land Rover at Red Square and The Kremlin in Moscow. Ruslan was awarded with special a Diploma for "Achievements in Culture and Arts". Orlando Bloom was an honored guest at this anniversary.
- 2008 – Judge for "Miss Lubercu 2008", Beauty pageant.

== Filmography ==
Film	Year	Role
Life Is Like Poker	2014	producer
Angel of Death	2014	producer
Island	2014	producer
Rock'n'Ball	2011	producer
Ya dozhdus	2011	producer
Land of Oblivion	2011	producer
The Will of Victory (A Doc Opera)	2011	associate producer
Iskateli Priklyucheniy	2010	producer
Parizhane	2010	producer
Kod apokalipsisa	2010	associate producer
Vorotily. Byt vmeste	2009	producer
Vorotily	2009	producer
V ozhidanii chuda	2007	producer
Zhivopisnaya Avantyura	2007	producer
Nulevoy kilometr	2007	actor / producer
Stealing Tarantino	2006	producer
20 nuits et un jour de pluie	2006	producer
Karusel	2005	producer
Parni iz stali	2005	producer
Polnyy vperyod!	2005	producer
Mechtat ne vredno	2005	producer
Countdown	2004	producer
