= Andrey Zolotov =

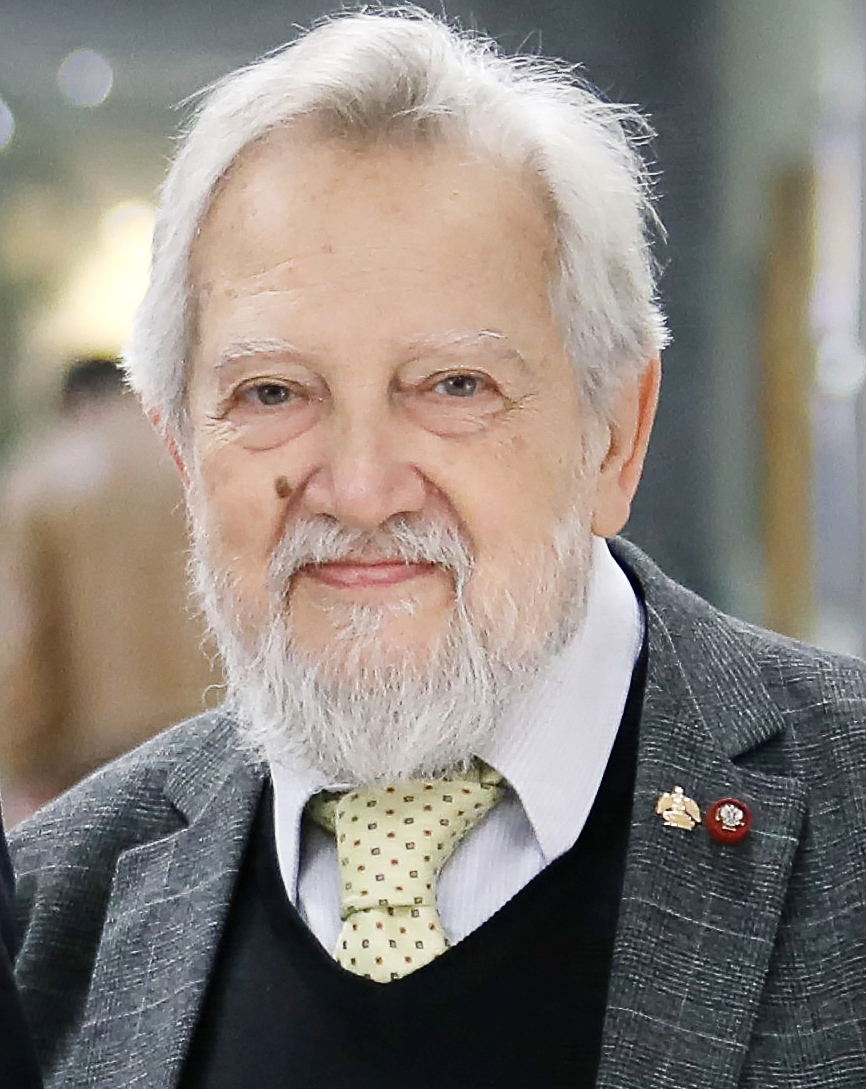

Andrej Andreevich Zolotov is a Russian screenwriter and music and art critic born in 1937, who has written over 30 documentaries about Russian musicians, composers and conductors. Today he is the vice president of the Russian Academy of Arts. The main belt asteroid 8142 Zolotov is named after him.

== Biography and career ==
Zolotov was born in Moscow in 1937. He studied journalism at the Moscow University, and then worked at numerous Soviet-era publications including Komsomolskaya Pravda and the TV series Vremya. He eventually attained the rank of Assistant Minister of Culture between 1990 and 1992. After the fall of the USSR he became the chief editor of RIA Novosti in 1994. As of 2012, he is the vice president of the Russian Academy of Arts.

He has two sons - Andrej Zolotov Jr., journalist, and Vsevolod, architect - and one daughter - Olga, concert pianist.
