= Yuri Mamin filmography =

Yuri Mamin (Russian: Юрий Борисович Мамин; born 8 May 1946) is a celebrated Soviet and Russian film director, stage director, screenwriter, composer, author and television host, Honored Art Worker of the Russian Federation.

== Films ==
Year	Film	Credited as				
Year	Film	Director	Writer	Composer	Actor	Notes
1982	I Wish You	Yes	Yes			Graduation work, comedy Screenplay by Yuri Mamin and Vyacheslav Leikin
1986	Neptune's Feast	Yes		Yes		Screenplay by Vladimir Vardunas
1988	Fountain	Yes			Yes	Screenplay by Vladimir Vardunas
1990	Bakenbardy	Yes			Yes	Screenplay by Vyacheslav Leikin
1993	Window to Paris	Yes	Yes	Yes	Yes	Screenplay by Yuri Mamin, Arkady Tigai and Vladimir Vardunas
1998	"Gorko!"	Yes	Yes	Yes	Yes	Screenplay by Yuri Mamin, Arkady Tigai and Vladimir Vardunas
2000–2003	Grim Tales From Russia	Yes	Yes	Yes	Yes	Television series, 18 episodes total
2008	Don't Think About White Monkeys	Yes	Yes			Screenplay by Yuri Mamin and Vladimir Vardunas Verse version by Vyacheslav Leikin

== Awards ==
- 1982 Award at the Film Festival of Young Cinematographers in Kiev (I Wish You)
- 1986 Golden Ducat Award at the International Film Festival in Mannheim, Germany (Neptune's Holiday)
- 1987 Grand Prize at the International Film Festival in Gabrovo, Bulgaria (Neptune's Holiday)
- Grand Prizes at film festivals in Moscow, Kiev and Tbilisi, 1988-1989 (Neptune's Holiday)
- 1988 Grand Prize at the International Film Festival "Golden Duke" in Odessa (Fountain)
- 1989 Grand Prize at the International Film Festival in Gabrovo, Bulgaria (Fountain)
- 1989 Grand Prize at the International Film Festival in Sanremo, Italy (Fountain)
- 1989 Grand prize at the International Film Festival in Quimper, France (Fountain)
- 1989 Prize for best ensemble cast at the "Constellation" (Sozvezdie) film festival, Russia (Fountain)
- 1990 Grand Prize at the International Film Festival in Belfort, France (Fountain)
- 1990 Grand Prize at the International Film Festival in Las Vegas, United States (Fountain)
- 1990 Grand Prize at the International Film Festival in Tróia, Portugal (Fountain)
- 1990 Chaplin's Golden Cane Award in Vevey, Switzerland (Fountain)
- 1991 Grand Prize at the International Film Festival in Torremolinos, Spain (Fountain)
- 1991 FIPRESCI Award in San Sebastián, Spain (Bakenbardy)
- 1993 Award for directing at the festival Kinoshock (Window to Paris)
- 1994 Award at the festival “Kinotavr” (Window to Paris)
- 1994 Grand Prize at the festival "Golden Ostap" (Window to Paris)
- 1994 Audience Award at the International Film Festival in Berlin (Window to Paris)
- 1995 UNESCO prize (Window to Paris)
- 1998 Award for best comedy film at the Vyborg Film Festival ("Gorko!")
- 2008 Jury Award for best Russian film by the International Federation of Film Societies at the International Film Festival in Moscow (Don't Think About White Monkeys)
- 2008 Award for innovation in the genre at the film festival "Smile, Russia!”, Russia (Don't Think About White Monkeys)
- 2009 Grand Prize at The End of the Pier International Film Festival, England (Don't Think About White Monkeys)
- 2009 Grand Prize at the International Film Festival in Rabat, Morocco (Don't Think About White Monkeys)
- 2009 Special Diploma from the jury for best actress to Katerina Ksenyeva at the International Film Festival in Rabat, Morocco (Don't Think About White Monkeys)
- 2011 Grand Prize at the Russian Gazette's First International Internet Film Festival “Double 2” (Don't Think About White Monkeys)
