= List of Soviet films of 1986 =

Title	Russian title	Director	Cast	Genre	Notes
1986
The Adventures of Lolo the Penguin	Приключения пингвинёнка Лоло	Kinjiro Yoshida, Gennady Sokolskiy	Svetlana Stepchenko, Lyudmila Gnilova, Rolan Bykov, Elena Sanaeva	Animation	Soviet-Japanese co-production
An Umbrella for Lovers	Зонтик для новобрачных	Rodion Nakhapetov	Aleksey Batalov, Nijole Ozelyte, Vera Glagoleva	Drama	
Attack	Атака	Igor Nikolayev	Sergey Chekan, Aleksandr Novikov, Vasili Popov	Drama	
Boris Godunov	Борис Годунов	Sergei Bondarchuk	Sergei Bondarchuk, Alyona Bondarchuk	Drama	Entered into the 1986 Cannes Film Festival, co-produced by Soviet Union, Poland, Czechoslovakia, West Germany
Breakthrough	Прорыв	Dmitri Svetozarov	Oleg Borisov	Disaster	
Coasts in the Mist	Берега в тумане	Yuli Karasik	Anatoly Kuznetsov, Leonid Filatov, Boris Lukanov	Drama	
Dead Man's Letters	Письма мёртвого человека	Konstantin Lopushansky	Rolan Bykov	Drama	
The Dolphin's Cry	Крик дельфина	Alexey Saltykov	Ivars Kalniņš, Donatas Banionis, Armen Dzhigarkhanyan	Science fiction	
Double Trap	Двойной капкан	Aloiz Brench	Algis Matulionis	Crime	
Empire	Ампир	Alexander Sokurov	Alla Osipenko	Crime	
Forgive Me	Прости	Ernest Yasan	Natalya Andreychenko, Igor Kostolevskiy, Viktor Merezhko	Drama	
Fouetté	Фуэте	Boris Yermolayev	Ekaterina Maximova		
Guard Me, My Talisman	Храни меня, мой талисман	Roman Balayan	Oleg Yankovskiy, Alexander Abdulov, Tatyana Drubich, Aleksandr Zbruyev, Alexander Adabashyan	Drama	Was entered into the main competition at the 43rd edition of the Venice Film Festival.
Higher Than Rainbow	Выше радуги	Georgi Yungvald-Khilkevich	Dmitry Maryanov, Olga Mashnaya, Galina Polskikh	Musical	
How to Become Happy	Как стать счастливым	Yuri Chulyukin	Nikolai Karachentsov, Marina Dyuzheva, Lev Durov	Comedy	
Investigation Held by Kolobki	Следствие ведут Колобки	Igor Kovalyov, Aleksandr Tatarskiy	Leonid Bronevoy	Animation	
Is It Easy to Be Young?	Легко ли быть молодым?	Juris Podnieks		Documentary	
Jaguar	Ягуар	Sebastián Alarcón	Sergey Veksler, Artyom Kaminsky, Adel Al-Khadad	Drama	
Kin-dza-dza!	Кин-дза-дза!	Georgiy Daneliya	Stanislav Lyubshin, Yevgeni Leonov, Yury Yakovlev, Levan Gabriadze	Sci-fi comedy	
Lermontov	Лермонтов	Nikolay Burlyaev	Nikolay Burlyaev, Ivan Burlyaev, Vladimir Faibyshev	Drama	
The Man from Fifth Avenue	Человек с Пятой авеню	Tengiz Semyonov	Joe Mauri	Documentary	
My Favorite Clown	Мой любимый клоун	Yuri Kushneryov	Oleg Menshikov, Ilya Tyurin, Vladimir Ilyin	Drama	
Neptune's Feast	Праздник Нептуна	Yuri Afanasyev, Yuri Mamin, N. Shilok	Lyudmila Arinina, Elena Kapitsa, Vladimir Eryomin	Comedy	
Old-fashioned Tricks	Проделки в старинном духе	Aleksandr Pankratov	Darya Mikhaylova, Vladimir Samoilov, Nikolay Trofimov	Comedy	
Sentimental Journey to the Potato	Сентиментальное путешествие на картошку	Dmitry Dolinin	Filipp Yankovsky, Anzhelika Nevolina, Pyotr Semak	Romance	
Sitting on the Golden Porch	На златом крыльце сидели	Boris Rytsarev	Yelena Denisova, Gennadiy Frolov, Sergey Nikolaev	Fantasy	
The Last Road	Последняя дорога	Leonid Menaker	Aleksandr Kalyagin, Vadim Medvedev, Irina Kupchenko	Drama	
The Twentieth Century Approaches	Двадцатый век начинается	Igor Maslennikov	Vasily Livanov, Vitaly Solomin, Rina Zelyonaya, Borislav Brondukov, Boris Klyuyev, Innokenti Smoktunovsky	Crime	
To Award (Posthumously)	Наградить (посмертно)	Boris Grigoryev	Aleksandr Timoshkin, Evgeniy Leonov-Gladyshev, Mikhail Zhigalov	Action	
Welcome	Добро пожаловать!	Alexei Karayev	Anatoli Barantsev	Animation	
Wild Pigeon	Чужая белая и рябой	Sergei Solovyov	Vyacheslav Ilyushchenko	Drama	Was selected as the Soviet entry for the Best Foreign Language Film at the 59th Academy Awards, but was not accepted as a nominee.
Zina-Zinulya	Зина-Зинуля	Pavel Chukhray	Evgeniya Glushenko, Viktor Pavlov, Vladimir Gostyukhin	Drama	
