= The Night Is Young (TV program) =

TV show

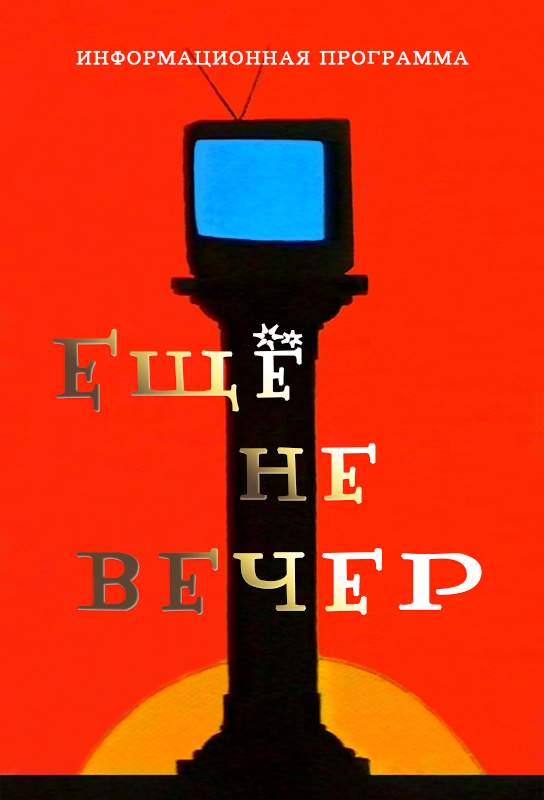
- Film poster
- Russian: Ещё не вечер
- Romanization: Eshchyo ne vecher
- Genre: Entertainment news, Talk show
- Directed by: Nikolay Milovidov
- Country of origin: Russia
- Original language: Russian
- No. of seasons: 2
- No. of episodes: 38

Production
- Production locations: Moscow, Russia
- Running time: 10 minutes (approx)
- Production company: REN TV

Original release
- Network: REN TV
- Release: 14 September 1997 – 6 March 1998

The Night Is Young – (Russian: Ещё не вечер, romanized: Eshchyo ne vecher) is a Russian day TV show on REN TV. This program was aired twice a week on Mondays and Fridays on REN TV in 1997–1998. A total of 38 programs were aired. Among the guests and participants of the program are Eduard Nazarov, Nina Yeryomina, Yuri Mamin, Eldar Ryazanov, Mikhail Ulyanov, Grigory Chukhray, Vladimir Molchanov, Vitaly Mansky, Yuri Rost, Lyudmila Gurchenko, Aleksandr Shirvindt, Mikhail Derzhavin, Gennady Khazanov, Grigori Gorin, Vladimir Spivakov, Sergei Korzun, Pyotr Fyodorov, Irina Mishina, Irena Lesnevskaya, Dmitry Lesnevsky and others.

== List of episodes ==
=== № 2. Sergey Korzun (1997) ===
- The guest of the program is journalist Sergey Korzun and the program For and against.

=== № 3. White Parrot. In memory of Yuri Nikulin (1997) ===
- Guest of the program White Parrot Club. The issue is dedicated to the memory of Yuri Nikulin. Arkady Arkanov, Mikhail Boyarsky and Elena Krasnikova share their memories.

=== № 4. News on REN TV: P. Fyodorov, I. Mishina, V. Gatov, A. Illesh (1997) ===
- In the program – how REN TV's Information Service is organized: Pyotr Fyodorov, Irina Mishina, Vasily Gatov, Andrey Illesh, as well as Shock Show with Natalia Abola.

=== № 5. Andrei Dementyev (1997) ===
- The guest of the program is film critic Andrei Dementyev.

=== № 6. Nina Yeremina (1997) ===
- The guest of the program is a sports commentator Nina Yeryomina.

=== № 7. Eduard Nazarov (1997) ===
- The guest of the program animator and director Eduard Nazarov and the program Animation from A to Z.

=== № 8. Vitaliy Manskiy (1997) ===
- The program includes director Vitaly Mansky with a story about the MIPTV Media Market in Cannes, and a drumming show with Dennis Chambers and Rishad Shafiev.

=== № 9. Ella Mitina (1997) ===
- The guest of the program is director Ella Mitina and the program Tomorrow Begins Today.

=== № 10. The best programs and films of REN TV (1997) ===
- The programs and films include Léon: The Professional (1994), The Paris Mysteries of Eldar Ryazanov, Shocking Asia (1981), The Breakdown (1974), The Shock Show, Deadly Passion (1985), Sundown: The Vampire in Retreat (1989) and M*A*S*H (1972).

=== № 11. Victor Azeev (1997) ===
- The guest of the program is Victor Azeev, an artist and cartoonist.

=== № 12. Retrospective of Claude Chabrol and other films (1997) ===
- The program includes a retrospective of Claude Chabrol, the films Les Biches (1968), the documentary The Saga of the French Chansonnier. Gilbert Bécaud, films Combats de femme. Mariage d'amour (1996), Tukabseu (1993), La Soif de l'or (1993), as well as Andrei Dementyev, Alexandr Shpagin and Alexei Nikolov with answers to viewers' questions.

=== № 13. Aleksandr Shpagin (1997) ===
- The guest of the program is film critic Aleksandr Shpagin.

=== № 14. 7 November. 80 years of the October Revolution (1997) ===
- The issue is devoted to the 80th anniversary of the October Revolution. The program includes Vitaly Mansky, Grigory Chukhray, Sergei Korzun on the premiere of Leni Riefenstahl's film Triumph of the Will (1935) on REN TV, the October Revolution and fascism, Stepan Kiselev's program Scandals, Rumors, Investigations about a man in love with the revolution, the intelligence agent Nikolai Leonov, Alexander Shpagin about the film Lyubov Yarovaya, and Ella Mitina and the program Children's Question.

=== № 15. Yuri Rost (1997) ===
- The guest of the program is the photographer and journalist Yuri Rost.

=== № 16. Eldar Ryazanov & Mikhail Ulyanov (1997) ===
- The program includes anniversaries of Eldar Ryazanov and Mikhail Ulyanov, feature films The Last Day (1972), The Irony of Fate (1975), Elle cause plus... Elle flingue (1972), Criminal, the documentary Wim Wenders Lightning Over Water (1980), as well as the Shock Show program by Natalia Abola.

=== № 17. Mihails Karasikovs & Tofik (1997) ===
- The guests of this program are Mihails Karasikovs and the alien beast Tofik.

=== № 18. The Ultimatum of Viewers and the Exploded Bomb (1997) ===
- The program includes feature films Surgeon Mishkin's Days (1976), Across Russia (1968), Stargate (1994), The Bounty Hunter (1989), The Money Trap (1965), documentaries with Kenneth Clark Pieter Bruegel the Elder (1959), Corot, Manet Case as well as a story about a bomb explosion in the premises of REN TV broadcaster in Nizhny Tagil and a note with an ultimatum found.

=== № 19. Films about love (1997) ===
- The program includes films about love – Animal Love (1996) by Ulrich Seidl, Private Collections (1979) by Walerian Borowczyk, Beyond the Clouds (1995) by Michelangelo Antonioni, Kings of the Road (1976) by Wim Wenders, The Road Home (1970) by Alexander Surin, Francis Ford Coppola's One from the Heart (1982), Everything Turned Blue, Fifty Years of Silence, La nuit de la mort! (1980), the House Concert program in memory of Bulat Okudzhava, and Natalia Abol's Shock Show. Andrey Dementyev, Alexander Shpagin, and Mikhail Kochetkov take part in the program.

=== № 20. Finnish Film Festival (1997) ===
- The program includes the Finnish Film Festival and the films Ilya Musin by Marjaana Mykkänen, Witnesses by Ilona Laurikainen, and a story by Reijo Nikkilä and Ilona Laurikainen about the films of the Festival. Andrei Dementiev and Alexander Shpagin present the films of the week: Wim Wenders' Kings of the Road (1976), Bertrand Tavernier's The Bait (1995), Ken Russell's The Lair of the White Worm (1988), Evil Obsession (1996), Élisa (1995), A Literature Lesson (1968), The Mysterious Wall (1967), and Adam and Eve (1969). The program also includes Natalia Abola's awarding of the Best Talk Show Host and Audience Award prizes at the II Open Russian Teleforum in Sochi.

=== № 21. Yuri Mamin & Mikhail Kochetkov (1997) ===
- The guests of this program are author and singer Mikhail Kochetkov and director Yuri Mamin.

=== № 22. Tofik & Mihails Karasikovs (1997) ===
- This issue includes Mihails Karasikovs and the alien beast Tofik in Mishanin's program, Ken Russell's The Lair of the White Worm (1988), Bertrand Tavernier's The Bait (1995), the documentaries Wie de Waarheid Zegt Moet Dood (1981) and Between Two Worlds (1990), also the Shock Show Natalia Abola.

=== № 23. Alexander Nekhoroshev. «Around the Kremlin» (1997) ===
- The guest of the program is Alexander Nekhoroshev and the program Around the Kremlin. Also on the program are Pyotr Fedorov with the program Renome, the films "Northern Express. The Third Class", Precious Find (1996), and Alexei Nikolov, producer of REN TV sports programs, about skier Vyacheslav Vedenin.

=== № 24. Films and programs (1997) ===
- The program includes films Les Anges gardiens (1995), The Month of August (1972), Murders Made to Order (1993), A Literature Lesson (1968), Evil Obsession (1996), Ciao, les mecs (1979), Around the Kremlin program with Ruslan Khasbulatov and Oleg Poptsov, as well as Shock Show.

=== № 25. «X-Files». Exclusive interviews (1997) ===
- The program includes the series The X-Files: exclusive interviews with David Duchovny, Gillian Anderson, Chris Carter, Sergei Spiridonov's story about the series Two (1996) and The Munsters (1964), the documentary The Man Who Stole Chaplin, the film Order of the Eagle (1989), the House Concert program and the White Parrot Club.

=== № 26. New Year's edition (1997) ===
- The program includes New Year's greetings from the programs 1/52, For and Against, Renome, as well as Olga Ivanova, Sergey Korzun, Savik Shuster and Vitaly Mansky.

=== № 27. REN TV channel is 1 year old (1998) ===
- Movies and TV series in January: Paris, Texas (1984), Wings of Desire (1987) by Wim Wenders, Le Boucher (1970), Wedding in Blood (1973) by Claude Chabrol, as well as Blood and Sand (1989), Class of 1999 (1990), Moon 44 (1990), Under Suspicion (1991 film), Astonished (1988), Mayakovsky laughs (1975), Arena (1967), Sashka (1981), Fast Train (1988), Stepmom (1973), The Circus Princess (1982), Goldmine (1977), Three Men in a Boat (1979), Alfred Hitchcock Presents (1985), Model Academy, The Heiress (1949).

=== № 28. Old New Year with REN TV (1998) ===
- The program includes a New Year's Eve with REN TV creators and guests Irena Lesnevskaya, Dmitry Lesnevsky, Vladimir Molchanov, Eldar Ryazanov, Yuri Rost, Vladimir Davydenko, Vitaly Mansky, Yuri Mamin, Lyudmila Gurchenko, Aleksandr Shirvindt, Mikhail Derzhavin, Gennady Khazanov, Grigori Gorin, Roman Kartsev, Mikhail Kochetkov, Sergey Korzun, Pyotr Fyodorov, Irina Mishina, Andrey Ilesh et al.

=== № 29. REN TV news (1998) ===
- The program includes Pyotr Fedorov on the news broadcasting service, Yevgeny Lyubimov on sports programs, as well as the series A Sucessora (1978) and the film Blood and Sand (1989).

=== № 30. New programs, movies, serials on REN TV channel (1998) ===
- Peter Fedorov on the news broadcasting service, Yevgeny Lyubimov on sports programs, Vladimir Spivakov and the Moscow Virtuosi, as well as the series A Sucessora (1978), the films Blood and Sand (1989), The Lady in Blue (1996) and Invasion Force (1990).

=== № 31. To the 60th anniversary of Vladimir Vysotsky (1998) ===
- The program includes a children's talk show Soviet Tales for Children Under 16, the 60th anniversary of Vladimir Vysotsky film The Two of Them (1977), the program House Concert, Your Lawyer, as well as the series Alfred Hitchcock Presents (1985).

=== № 32. Soviet Tales for Children Under 16. 1998 ===
- The program includes children's talk show Soviet Tales for Children Under 16, Alexander Nefyodov on the program Your Lawyer, the series Les Cordier, juge et flic (1992), Alfred Hitchcock Presents (1985), as well as the Claude Chabrol crime drama Wedding in Blood (1973).

=== № 33. How to get a job at REN TV (1998) ===
- The program tells about how to get a job at REN TV.

=== № 34. «Belye Stolby» Festival of Archive Films – TV Serial «To be remembered» (1998) ===
- The program includes a story by Andrei Dementiev about the Belye Stolby '98 film festival and the To be remembered awards program, as well as Big Report program by Vitaly Mansky, the Alfred Hitchcock Presents (1985), Amazing Stories (1985), The Ballad of Bering and His Friends (1970), The Road to Corinth (1967), The Big Wash (1968), Prototype (1992 film), Juge et partie (1997), We'll Live Till Monday (1968) and about the performance of a trio of Croatian guitarists in the Rachmaninoff Hall of the Moscow Conservatory.

=== № 35. How to sell a TV program. TV market in New Orleans (1998) ===
- The program includes a TV market in New Orleans, Vitaly Mansky and The Big Report about Mormons and polygamy, Peter Fedorov and Renome about a Sakhalin colony sharing a bread ration with a neighboring starving village.

=== № 36. The programs «Pros & Cons» and «Soviet Tales for Children Under 16». Korzun and Mikhalkov (1998) ===
- The program includes a story about the programs Pros & Cons with Sergei Korzun and Ksenia Larina, Soviet Tales for Children Under 16 with Sergey Mikhalkov, the movie Dear boy (1975), the TV series Taxi (1978) with Danny DeVito and Cheers, as well as announcements of Three Men to Kill (1980), An Ordinary Miracle (1978), Cœurs Caraïbes (1995), Oblivion 2: Backlash, Unfinished Supper (1979), Midaq Alley (1995), Velvet Season (1978), Les Cordier, juge et flic (1992), and This Man Must Die (1969).

=== № 37. Woman of the Year – Irena Lesnevskaya (1998) ===
- The program includes the awarding of the Woman-97 Russia and America Award to Irena Lesnevskaya, the Renome program, a documentary about Moscow by Rai correspondent Marc Innaro, The Oprah Winfrey Show and movie announcements of the week: Let Sleeping Cops Lie (1988), Krechinsky's Wedding (1974), Cœurs Caraïbes (1995), Tout ce qui brille (1996), A Very English Murder (1974), Spiral (1978), Strictly Business (1962), Chipollino (1973), The Triangle (1967), Les Cordier, juge et flic (1992), Casque d'Or (1952).

=== № 38. Irena Lesnevskaya – woman of the year. Award ceremony (1998) ===
- The ceremony of awarding Irena Lesnevskaya with the Woman of the Year Award and congratulations by Eldar Ryazanov, Ella Pamfilova, Yuli Gusman, Alla Gerber, Andrei Karaulov, Vladislav Tretiak, Irina Khakamada, Oleg Matveev and Zurab Sotkilava.

== Broadcast dates ==
| Item No. | Date | Time |
|---|---|---|
| 1 | 14 September 1997 | 14.15 |
| 2 | 15 September 1997 | 15.20 |
| 3 | 19 September 1997 | 15.20 |
| 4 | 22 September 1997 | 15.20 |
| 5 | 26 September 1997 | 15.20 |
| 6 | 29 September 1997 | 15.20 |
| 7 | 3 October 1997 | 15.20 |
| 8 | 10 October 1997 | 15.20 |
| 9 | 17 October 1997 | 15.20 |
| 10 | 20 October 1997 | 15.20 |
| 11 | 24 October 1997 | 15.20 |
| 12 | 27 October 1997 | 15.20 |
| 13 | 31 October 1997 | 15.20 |
| 14 | 7 November 1997 | 15.20 |
| 15 | 14 November 1997 | 15.20 |
| 16 | 17 November 1997 | 15.20 |
| 17 | 21 November 1997 | 15.20 |
| 18 | 24 November 1997 | 15.20 |
| 19 | 28 November 1997 | 15.20 |
| 20 | 5 December 1997 | 15.20 |
| 21 | 12 December 1997 | 15.20 |
| 22 | 15 December 1997 | 15.20 |
| 23 | 19 December 1997 | 15.20 |
| 24 | 22 December 1997 | 15.20 |
| 25 | 26 December 1997 | 15.20 |
| 26 | 29 December 1997 | 15.20 |
| 27 | 2 January 1998 | 15.20 |
| 28 | 9 January 1998 | 15.20 |
| 29 | 16 January 1998 | 15.20 |
| 30 | 19 January 1998 | 15.20 |
| 31 | 23 January 1998 | 15.20 |
| 32 | 26 January 1998 | 15.20 |
| 33 | 30 January 1998 | 15.20 |
| 34 | 6 February 1998 | 16.15 |
| 35 | 13 February 1998 | 16.15 |
| 36 | 20 February 1998 | 16.15 |
| 37 | 27 February 1998 | 16.15 |
| 38 | 6 March 1998 | 16.15 |
