= Nikolay Milovidov =

Russian documentary filmmaker

- Никола́й Милови́дов
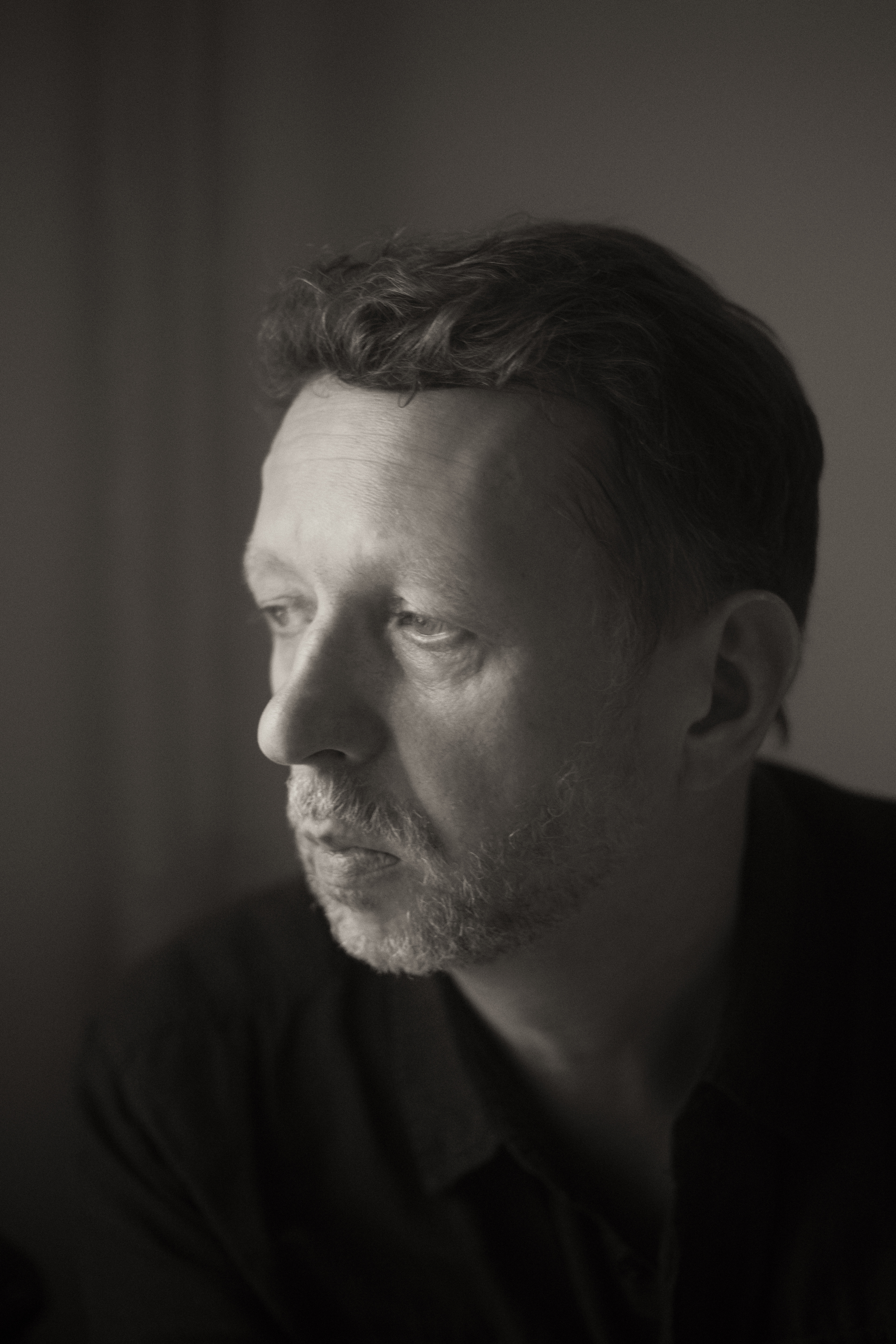
- Milovidov in 2016
- Born: Nikolaj Nikolaevich Milovidov; 30 October 1963 (age 62); Moscow, Russian SFSR, USSR
- Education: MSU Faculty of Journalism
- Occupations: Film director, screenwriter
- Years active: 1992–present

Nikolay Nicolaevich Milovidov (Russian: Никола́й Никола́евич Милови́дов; born 30 October 1963) is a Russian documentary film-maker, an author and director of numerous films and telecasts, and a laureate of international festivals. His films were shown on Russian television and on the other countries' channels, including BBC. He has directed more than 20 films and more than 100 TV programmes. He has worked as a reporter, an editor, a film director and a stage director.

== Biography ==
Nikolay Milovidov was born on October 30, 1963, in Moscow. He graduated from the Faculty of Journalism at Moscow State University (Department of Literary Criticism and Publicism, supervised by Professor Nikolai Bogomolov) and the Institute of TV and Radio Workers (workshop of directing by Igor Belyaev, Academician of the Russian National Television Award TEFI). He studied art and design at the Higher School of Economics. He worked as a director for Channel One Russia, Voice of Russia, REN TV, Seven TV, ATV (Russia). A number of his films were shown not only on Russian central TV channels, but also abroad. The film Search and You Will Find It, shot in 1992 on the basis of the events of the 4th International Festival of Orthodox Music for the British TV channel BBC, became the first Russian stereo documentary film shot using the Dolby Digital system. It premiered in Russia in September of that year on Channel 4 of Ostankino. As a director of the program The Night Is Young on REN TV, he shot interviews with people like Eduard Nazarov, Nina Yeryomina, Yuri Mamin, Eldar Ryazanov, Mikhail Ulyanov, Grigory Chukhray, Vladimir Molchanov, Vitaly Mansky, Yuri Rost, Sergei Korzun, Peter Fedorov, Irina Mishina, Andrey Illesh, Irena Lesnevskaya and others.

All in all he has made about twenty films and over a hundred TV shows. He is the scriptwriter of films Finding Color. Denis Buryakov, Incitatus, His Name Was Robson. He has worked as a reporter, editor, film director, director of photography. He is a Member of the Non-Fiction Film and Television Guild, of the Russian Geographical Society, jury of the photo exhibition Sport Tourism and Travels in Russia. He is currently working in post-production.

== Filmography ==
=== Films ===
- 1992 — Search and You Will Find It
- 1992 — Zealous Protectress
- 1992 — Sirin
- 1993 — A Christmas Fairy Tale
- 1993 — The Russian Pilgrim
- 1994 — Good News
- 1994 — The Two
- 1995 — The First Dean
- 1995 — The Moscow Pilgrims
- 1996 — Finding of Color. Denis Bouriakov
- 1996 — Incitatus
- 1997 — Lev Gumilev
- 1998 — His Name was Robeson
- 1999 — Metro 2000

=== Television ===
Television series aired on REN TV channel:

- The Night Is Young, 1997–1998

=== Works in voice-over ===
- 1993 — A Christmas Fairy Tale
- 1996 — Finding of Color. Denis Bouriakov

== Awards ==
- 1995 — Diploma of the III Sichuan International Television Festival Golden Panda (SCTVF). Chengdu, China.

== Publications ==
- 1996 — The film The First Dean was included in the film collection Golden-domed Moscow, released by KVO Krupny plan on videotapes in 1996
- 2015 — Easter Island. A book of photographs by Nikolay Milovidov. М., 2015.

== Design ==
- Malay-Indonesian Studies. Issue XXI
- Malay-Indonesian Studies. Issue XX
- Malay-Indonesian Studies. Issue XIX
- Skorodumova L.G. Mongolian literature of XIX-XX centuries. Questions of poetics
- Lena Vladimirova. A Handful of Flying Lines
- Sikorsky V. About the Literature and Culture of Indonesia
- Nikolay Milovidov. Easter Island
