= Denis Bouriakov =

Russian flutist (born 1981)

- Born: October 25, 1981 (age 44); Simferopol, Ukrainian Soviet Socialist Republic, USSR
- Genre: Classical
- Instrument: Flute

Denis Viktorovich Bouriakov (Russian: Денис Викторович Буряков; born 25 October 1981, in Simferopol, Ukrainian Soviet Socialist Republic, USSR) is a Russian flautist. He is currently principal flutist of the Los Angeles Philharmonic.

== Biography ==
Bouriakov was born in Simferopol, Ukrainian Soviet Socialist Republic (now Crimea). He started his musical career in a choir in Simferopol, but soon decided to switch to woodwind instruments, settling on the flute after originally intending to play the oboe. From the age of 10 he studied flute at the Moscow Central Special Music School.

In 2000 he moved to London to study at the Royal Academy of Music with William Bennett. There he was awarded the Principal's Award. In 2006 he was made an Associate of the Royal Academy of Music (ARAM). At the same time he was freelancing as principal flute with different orchestras in Europe, including the Philharmonia and the hr-Sinfonieorchester.

He later became the principal flute of the Tampere Philharmonic Orchestra and teacher at the local conservatoire for three years. In 2008 he moved to Spain to play with the Barcelona Symphony and Catalonia National Orchestra and in 2009 he was appointed principal flute of the Metropolitan Opera Orchestra in New York City.

As a soloist he has performed with the Moscow Symphony and Philharmonic Orchestras, Prague Chamber Orchestra, Odense Symphony Orchestra, Munich Chamber Orchestra, Chamber Ensemble of Paris and Tampere Philharmonic Orchestra among others.

In 2014, he was named a Fellow of the Royal Academy of Music.

In 2015, he was appointed principal flute of the Los Angeles Philharmonic, holding the Virginia and Henry Mancini Chair. He explained some of the motivations for joining that orchestra in a 2017 interview:

“At the Met, we work like crazy from the second half of August until the season ends middle of May. During that time, you have one week off and four personal days which you can take, but that’s also complicated. You have to take a week in which you can be safely rotated off because there are four operas going on at a time, and if there’s a non-traditional opera, you have to commit to all the performances.”

Both he and his wife, Erin, a fellow flutist whom he met while they were students at the RAM, discovered that the situation began to wear on them. “The worst part is, if you have a family, coming back home at midnight or 1am on a regular basis. At the Met, if you’d finish by 10:30, that’s a short opera. Sometimes you get lucky and you play Strauss’s Elektra which is maybe two hours long, but if you have a Wagner opera then it’s six hours long. My wife was alone taking care of our son all the time, and we both realized something had to change.”

. . . “I think our woodwinds are tough to beat,” says Mr. Bouriakov confidently but not arrogantly, “and our brass too. Our combined winds are the best of any orchestra I’ve played in. Both Tom [Hooten] and Andrew [Bain] are amazing players. I was blown away the first time I heard them live, and I’m so happy to play with them.”

On 20 March 2017 he performed a concert for the Utah Flute Association in Salt Lake City, in which he made Sally Linford cry.

There is a 1996 documentary by Nikolay Milovidov about Denis Buryakov, Finding of color. Denis Bouriakov.
