= Don't Think About White Monkeys =

Don‘t Think About White Monkeys
- Poster
- Directed by: Yuri Mamin
- Screenplay by: Yuri Mamin; Vladimir Vardunas; Vyacheslav Leikin
- Produced by: Lyudmila Samokhvalova; Aleksandr Girda
- Starring: Mikhail Tarabukin; Katerina Ksenyeva; Aleksei Devotchenko; Anvar Libabov
- Cinematography: Aleksandr Gusev
- Edited by: Yuri Mamin
- Music by: Yuri Mamin; Roman Zaslavsky
- Production company: Fountain Studio
- Release dates: June 2008 (Moscow Film Festival); 22 January 2009
- Running time: 120 minutes
- Country: Russia
- Language: Russian

Don‘t Think About White Monkeys ("Не думай про белых обезьян") is a Russian social satirical tragicomedy film, directed by Yuri Mamin. The creators of the film define its genre as a tragic farce. The screenplay was written by Yuri Mamin and Vladimir Vardunas. The form of the film is unusual: all dialogues are in verse accompanied by a strict musical rhythm.

== Plot ==
A hero of our time, the young bartender Vova Smorodin (Mikhail Tarabukin), receives the task of opening a small, but prestigious restaurant called "Paradise Corner" from his boss Gavrilych, the father of Vova's fiancée, Larisa. Perceiving this task as the first step in his financial career, Vova Smorodin develops the magic-touch of enterprise. If he needs to drain and repair the selected basement, he may recall an entire fire brigade from a fire emergency, or a company of soldiers from a mission.

After taking over an empty attic for his office, Vova discovers there three Bohemian artists who have escaped from a mental hospital: the suicidal model Dasha (Katerina Ksenyeva), the alcoholic artist Gena (Aleksei Devotchenko) and the mute Buddhist known by the nickname Khu-Pun' (Anvar Libabov). This meeting becomes a turning point in Vova's previously confident life. Having realized that the homeless artists could paint appetizing food on the walls of his basement restaurant in exchange for room and board, he allows them to live in his attic. While exploiting their work, Vova does not notice that he begins to fall under the influence of his uninvited guests, discovering for himself a heretofore unknown world of spiritual values.

Gradually, he begins to understand that beauty is not measured by fashion, that love is not limited to sex, that material riches do not replace spiritual enrichment. The artist Gena, who is supposed to draw still lifes, gets caught up in creativity and covers the walls of the basement with frescoes of the Last Judgment - an assembly of hellish monsters and sinners. Vova is shocked; what will his boss Gavrilych and his fellow waiters say?

However, the increasing flow of curious tourists convinces Vova that the artist was right. As a result, instead of "Paradise Corner", Vova opens the café "Inferno". Gavrilych's reaction comes as no surprise; the boss shows up with a pack of "Chaldeans" and destroys all of the artist's work, tearing down the unique murals from the basement walls. Vova, who tries to prevent the vandalism, is cruelly beaten.

The second half of the film is devoted to Vova's time in the attic, which he spends with his new friends, who help him to recover and introduce him to a vegetarian diet and to regular meditations on the roof. Vova begins to see strange dreams, where the past and future are intermingled. He begins to understand that his path has been predetermined, and that his future actions, including the betrayal of his friends, have been predicted by someone. And so it happens: unable to withstand the trials of an ascetic lifestyle, Vova ends the relationship with his friends and leaves them defenseless in the face of the cruel Gavrilych.

Vova returns to his usual environment among the "Chaldeans" and continues his successful career in the restaurant business. However, Vova begins to be pursued more and more often by the image of white monkeys, which reminds him of his unsuccessful attempt to become a person of depth, and of the treason he had committed against his friends.

== Cast ==
- Mikhail Tarabukin (Vova)
- Katerina Ksenyeva (Dasha)
- Aleksei Devotchenko (Gena)
- Anvar Libabov (Khu-Pun')

Also featuring: Victor Smirnov, Oleg Basilashvili, Sergei Yursky, Iveta Rogova, Irina Rakshina, Filip Azarov, Vladimir Leletko, Mikhail Bashakov, Aleksandr Kavalerov

== History ==
"Don't Think About White Monkeys" became Yuri Mamin's first feature film after a ten-year break. The film company "Paradise" was responsible for the distribution of the film. Twenty copies of the film were prepared, only twelve of which ended up in theaters.

According to the film's creators, "Don't Think About White Monkeys" has been deprived of television publicity due to its sharp satirical spirit. People who measure everything by money are called in the film "Chaldeans", i.e. lackeys, and a financially successful Russian businessman is the subject of ridicule due to his ignorance and primitiveness. The satire of the film, which offends, to some degree, even the television investors and advertisers, is not palatable for the masters of show business in today's Russia.

The company "Paradise" produced the DVDs of the film, which appeared in commercial centers; unauthorized copies of the DVDs, which appeared on the market simultaneously with the licensed discs, were so successful in sales that the store chain "Titanic" named the film a "sales hit" in its informational pages for April 2009. All of the director's attempts to defend his copyright and to fight with the infringers were by far unsuccessful.

Successful premiere showings of the film took place in Russia, England, the USA, Ukraine, Canada, Germany, France, Italy, Portugal and Lithuania at a number of film festivals.

At the end of April, 2011, the directors of the Russian Gazette ("Rossiyskaya Gazeta") organized the first online film festival "Double 2", as an alternative to the commercial mass media festivals.

During this film festival, eight films were placed on the Internet for viewers' judgment and were watched in 56 countries around the world. Russia led in the number of viewers, followed by Germany, the USA, Ukraine, Israel, Great Britain, New Zealand, Canada, France, China, and Sweden. Rounding out this list were Brazil, Ecuador, Egypt, Cameroon, Thailand and Mongolia. The film "Don't Think About White Monkeys" received the grand prize.

International distribution of the film begins in 2011.

== Philosophy ==
The creators of the film accuse the contemporary commercial mass media in "dumbing down the world culture and losing the cultural traditions in cinematography". They believe that the most prominent "food for the soul" in the history of cinema is non-commercial in spirit, such as the films of Andrei Tarkovsky, Luchino Visconti, Michael Cimino, John and Nick Cassavetes, Federico Fellini, Robert Zemeckis, Ingmar Bergman and Oliver Stone.

"Don't Think About White Monkeys" is not only social satire, but also a film about love, about the search for the meaning of life and the ways of men, about treachery, and about "white monkeys," which symbolize human conscience. The main theme of the film is the eternal dichotomic struggle between business and spirituality; a person whose life is dedicated only to the material, and not to spiritual enrichment, cannot truly be happy, because his world is narrow and his soul is deprived of beauty.

The official website recommends the film to "all young people, punks, rockers, non-conformists, Buddhists, students and those who have not lost the ability to think and feel" and doesn't recommend it to the "fans of the official mass cinema films, of pop culture films, of fast-food films; and also the Chaldeans".

Actress Katerina Ksenyeva, who played the leading female role, received a blessing for the film from the Dalai Lama in India, along with her friend, Tibetan monk Tenchoe. Film director Yuri Mamin is a member of the International Tibet Support Network and also received a blessing from envoys of the Dalai Lama in Saint Petersburg, Russia. The Dalai Lama's envoys said that the film is very relevant in our difficult times for the whole world and contains the energy of enlightenment, which affirms the power of kindness and mercy over the desires of the "masters of life" for money grubbing and barbarity.

== English version ==
Ray Gillon, the renown British sound producer, liked the film very much and offered to dub it into English. In his words, there have been very few films in recent times that have touched his soul as much as this powerful parable in verse. Because of this, a poetic English translation was made for dubbing the film in London. For the first time in history, a Russian film in verse will be dubbed into English verse.

== Awards ==
Jury Award for best Russian film by the International Federation of Film Societies at the International Film Festival in Moscow, Russia, 2008

Award for innovation in the genre of comedy at the film festival "Smile, Russia!", 2008

Grand prize for best foreign film and grand prize for best foreign actor at the End of the Pier International Film Festival, England, 2009

Art prize "Petropol" for breakthrough contribution in the art of comedy film (Russia, 2009)

Grand prize for best original film at the International Film Festival in Rabat, Morocco, 2009

King Hassan II Special Prize at the International Film Festival in Rabat, Morocco, 2009

Special International Jury Diploma to Katerina Ksenyeva for "brilliant impersonation of the heroine" at the International Film Festival in Rabat, Morocco, 2009

Grand prize at the Russian Gazette's First International Internet Film Festival "Double 2", 2011

== See also ==
- Yuri Mamin
- Cinema of Russia
- Katerina Ksenyeva
