= Katerina Ksenyeva =

Russian actress, singer, composer and journalist (born 1975)

- Born: Katerina Yuryevna Mamina; 5 December 1975 (age 50); Leningrad, Russian SFSR, Soviet Union (now Saint Petersburg, Russia)
- Occupations: Actress, singer, composer, author, journalist
- Years active: 1997 to the present
- Parent(s): Film director Yuri Mamin Actress and producer Lyudmila Samokhvalova
- Website: Her YouTube channel

Katerina Yuryevna Ksenyeva (Russian: Катерина Юрьевна Ксеньева, born 5 December 1975) is a Russian actress, singer, composer and journalist. Since 2013, Ksenyeva works in New York City. She sings in English and Hebrew. She was the leading actress in the film Don't Think About White Monkeys and in the TV series Grim Tales From Russia. She also produced a vocal album Lullaby for a Man with her ballads. She is daughter of film director Yuri Mamin.

== Biography ==
Katerina Ksenyeva was born in Saint Petersburg, Russia (formerly Leningrad, RSFSR, USSR). Her father is film director Yuri Mamin. Her mother is the actress Lyudmila Samokhvalova.

== Career ==
=== Theater ===
Katerina Ksenyeva studied at the Department of Opera Vocals at the Musical College at the Bishkek Conservatory under teachers Vladimir Mukovnikov and Bulat Minzhilkiev. Later on, in 1994, she enrolled in the Drama Department at the Saint Petersburg State Theatre Arts Academy. In 1998, she graduated from the master workshop of the actor and director Yuri Tomoshevsky, who taught her unique techniques of "nervous" behavior on the stage.

=== Cinema ===
Ksenyeva's film career started from her diploma role as the part of Elvira in Max Frisch's play acting in Santa-Cruz at the Comedian's Refuge State Theater ("Priyut Komedianta"). Since then, Yuri Mamim invited her to participate in his projects, starting from the naïve 1960s bride in the film Gorko! (1997).

As a leading actress, she appeared the first time as the cross-eyed romantic journalist Masha in Yuri Mamin's TV series Grim Tales From Russia (2000–2003), which was created as a satirical analogue of the American X-Files planted on Russian soil.

In 2004, Ksenyeva played the part of actress Zoya who killed a rapist with a sniper rifle in Kirill Kapitsa TV series Cops.

In the celebrated film Don't Think About White Monkeys, Katerina Ksenyeva plays the leading role of Dasha, a destitute young suicidal Russian woman who finds herself in a humiliating situation and struggles to survive. Dasha escapes from a psychiatric hospital and returns with her friend to his attic, where they are discovered by Vova, a successful barman and businessman. At first, Vova dreams of using all three of them for cheap labor, but then Vova's life changes under the influence of these destitute, restless, non-conformist and talented people. When he betrays them and ruins their lives, Vova understands that his life is devoid of meaning.

According to the director, Yuri Mamin, Ksenyeva actively participated in the production of the film, which was released in Russian theaters in January 2009 and received numerous international and national awards.

=== Music ===
Katerina Ksenyeva's rock ballad "Lullaby for a Man", released in 2006, was top-rated by the listeners of the Moscow Radio Maximum in 2007. The ballad was dedicated to the crew of Russian Kursk submarine who were left to drown by the state without any assistance. Her 2009 vocal album Lullaby for a Man starts with her ballad; The remaining songs in the album belong to various genres, including Ksenyeva's mystic ballad "Insomnia" from the film Don't Think About White Monkeys.

Since 2008, Ksenyeva started composing instrumental compositions for English songs with her own lyrics. Her first English song, "New York, New Life, New Love", is dedicated to all New Yorkers and to the victims of the 11 September 2001 terror attacks.

== Interesting facts ==
According to media reports and Katerina Ksenyeva's official website, she is also working on two film projects. One, called "Rockman", is about cross-cultural synthesis and the fate of talented people in Russia and America at the beginning and the middle of the 20th century. Another project, called "The Joy of Love to Joyce", is about the suffering of the Russian intelligentsia in general and the tragic fate of the Russian translators of James Joyce's novel Ulysses in particular.

Ksenyeva's other film-related projects include English dubbing of the versed film "Don't Think About White Monkeys", aimed at preserving the original rhythm of Russian verses. She is also a journalist who authored articles on various subjects, mostly related to social justice and international solidarity. After receiving an O visa for workers with extraordinary abilities in arts, she left Russia in 2013 and started working in the US.

== Roles ==
Work in theater: 1997–2000. Comedian's Refuge State Theater ("Priyut Komedianta") in Saint Petersburg, led by Yuri Tomoshevsky. Leading tragic role of Elvira in Max Frisch's play "Santa-Cruz".

1997: "Gorko!" ("Wedding Kisses"), romantic comedy directed by Yuri Mamin. Ksenyeva plays the role of a 1960s romantic fiancée.

2000–2003: Grim Tales from Russia, 18 satiric TV series, directed by Yuri Mamin. The leading role of Masha Palkina, a young squint-eyed journalist.

2003: "The Sniper", episode in the detective TV series "Cops", directed by Kirill Kapitsa. The role of Zoya, a revengeful actress.

2009: Don't Think About White Monkeys, a tragicomedy directed by Yuri Mamin. The leading role of Dasha, a penniless Bohemian intellectual.

== Prizes and awards ==
Grand prize at the All-Theater Contest of Romance Singers, 1995 (while being a 2nd year student at the Saint Petersburg State Theatre Arts Academy)

Second place winner of the International Singer Contest AYUM-97, 1997

Special International Jury Diploma for best actress and Moritz de Hadeln's special remarks at the International Film Festival in Rabat, Morocco, 2009
