= Petropol =

- Awarded for: Achievements in the field of culture and art, original projects and patronage of the arts.
- Country: Russia
- First award: 1999; 27 years ago

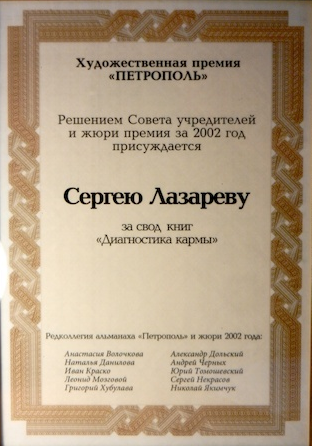
Petropol Award

Petropol is a Russian award, given for achievements in the field of culture and art, original projects and patronage of the arts. It was founded by the National Pushkin Museum and the editorial board of the Petropol almanac. Winners of the award include Aleksandr Volodin, Daniil Granin, Yuri Shevchuk, Boris Grebenshchikov, Oleg Basilashvili and Alisa Freindlich.
