= Sideburns (film) =

- DVD release cover
- Бакенбарды
- Directed by: Yuri Mamin
- Screenplay by: Vyacheslav Leykin
- Starring: Viktor Sukhorukov, Alexander Medvedev, Artur Vakha, Alexander Lykov
- Cinematography: Sergei Nekrasov
- Production company: Lenfilm
- Release date: 1990
- Country: USSR
- Language: Russian

Sideburns (Russian: Бакенбарды, romanized: Bakenbardy) is a 1990 Russian satire film directed by Yuri Mamin.

== Background ==
The film was inspired by the activities of the group Pamyat, which emerged at the end of the 1970s and became widely known in the late 1980s as an ultra patriotic movement and a prominent champion of newly revived Russian nationalism. The group organised protest rallies against what they called the "Ziono-Masonic plot" to weaken Russia and distributed pamphlets listing the names and addresses of people, mostly prominent writers and musicians, who were to be lynched as public enemies. One of these pamphlets came to the attention of Mamin, who showed it to his friend, writer Vyacheslav Leykin.

== Synopsis ==
A small town in perestroika Russia is plagued by groups of ideologically minded young people. The Capella group preaches breaking taboos: open relationships, sex orgies, homosexuality, vandalism and punk music. They terrorise the town daily. To the older residents of the town Capella is the devil made flesh. The only ones fighting Capella are a group of violent bullies who call themselves "the Tusks". A student, Alexander, has come to town with a university friend to visit his aunt and uncle. The young men arrive dressed as early 19th century gentlemen in top hats and capes, both sporting sideburns and walking canes. They are the Pushkin club whose sacred aim is the salvation of Russia. Finding out that his young cousin has run away from home to join Capella, Alexander goes to find their haunt in an attempt to bring her to reason and return her to her family. Having failed in his errand and led on by Viktor, his mysterious friend and mentor, Alexander makes a new attempt to save the town and Russia.

The young men arrive at the basement quarters of the Tusks to speak to the gang. Finding the men somewhat aggressive, the young followers of Pushkin display prodigious cane-fighting skills. Beaten into submission and overwhelmed by the intellect and excellent manners of the two Pushkinists, the Tusks recognise their new leaders.

They must now grow sideburns and learn to fight with a cane... It seems nothing can stop the two young Pushkin fans from bringing morality, education and order back to the town. But the game will soon spiral out of control.

== Cast ==
- Viktor Sukhorukov as Viktor
- Alexander Medvedev as Alexander
- Artur Vakha as Hertz
- Alexander Lykov as a Tusks member
- Elena Nemchenko as aunt Olya
- Viktor Mikhailov as uncle Pasha
- Olga Alabysheva as Lenka
- Anatoliy Zhuravlev as Tolyan
- Olga Samarina as Valkyrie

== Awards ==
The film received the FIPRESCI award in San Sebastián in 1991.
