= Window to Paris =

- Окно в Париж
- Directed by: Yuri Mamin
- Written by: Vladimir Vardunas; Arkady Tigai
- Starring: Sergey Dontsov; Viktor Mikhaylov; Agnès Soral
- Cinematography: Sergey Nekrasov; Anatoly Lapshov
- Music by: Aleksei Zalivalov; Yuri Mamin
- Production companies: Films du Bouloi; Fontan; La Sept Cinema; Troitsky Bridge
- Release date: 1993
- Running time: 112 minutes
- Countries: Russia; France
- Languages: Russian; French
- Box office: $255,088 (U.S. only)

Window to Paris (Russian: Окно в Париж) is a 1993 Russian comedic drama film directed by Yuri Mamin. In the film, which is set in the 1990s, a magical portal connecting Saint Petersburg with Paris is discovered. The main character, Nikolai Chizhov, is a school music teacher and a member of the Russian intelligentsia.

== Plot ==
In 1992 Russia, music teacher Nikolay Chizhov moves into a communal apartment in St. Petersburg, where he discovers a mysteriously boarded-up window in his new room. During a housewarming party, he and his guests drunkenly descend from this window, believing it leads to the streets of St. Petersburg. Instead, they stumble upon a bar in Paris. The next day, Chizhov learns from a returning elderly resident that the window periodically opens to Paris for a few weeks every few decades. Realizing the limited time to access Paris, Chizhov's neighbor, Gorokhov, and his family begin cross-border ventures through the window, from selling souvenirs to transporting a Citroën 2CV into Russia.

Alongside the whimsical exploits, Chizhov faces challenges in his career and personal life. After protesting the dismissal of music education at his school, he is fired, prompting a student strike in his support. He tries to find work in Paris, only to turn down an unusual gig at a nudist club. A romance develops between Chizhov and Parisian Nicole, whose apartment connects to the same rooftop as the magical window. When Gorokhov lures Nicole into Russia, she becomes lost and overwhelmed by the harsh realities of 1990s Russia before Chizhov ultimately helps her return to Paris. Later, fulfilling a promise to his students, Chizhov uses the window to show them Paris, but they miss the window's closing, forcing them to attempt a daring return to Russia by hijacking a plane. Months later, Chizhov and Gorokhov spot the old resident's cat emerging from a crack in the wall, sparking their hopes of reopening the path to Paris.

== Reception ==
Mamin considered it unfair that the film was not chosen as the official Russian submission for the 1994 Academy Award for Best International Feature Film, asserting that this was due to the personal and political influence of Nikita Mikhalkov.
