= The Man from Fifth Avenue =

- Russian: Человек с Пятой авеню
- Directed by: Tengiz Semyonov
- Written by: Genrikh Borovik; Leonid Zamyatin
- Starring: Joe Mauri
- Distributed by: Central Studio of Documentary Films
- Release date: 1986
- Running time: 90 minutes
- Country: Soviet Union
- Languages: Russian, English

The Man from Fifth Avenue (Russian: «Человек с Пятой авеню») is a 1986 Soviet documentary film about everyday life on Fifth Avenue of New York City.

The film opens with a protest in Washington, D.C., closing-up on homeless people in blankets, trying to sleep on the ground. It then moves to a New York street, with skyscrapers and yellow taxis. After about six minutes, a narrator introduces the main person, Joe Mauri. He was threatened with eviction from his flat on West 70th Street as his landlady wanted to use that space as a sewing room. Mauri lived in the flat for 12 years, paying $98 a month for a small, 54-square-foot room. After a brief tour of his apartment, he walks around outside, showing off Manhattan, including the Plaza Hotel. The film then shows New York exteriors intercut with conversational snippets from Mauri about social stratification, unemployment and corporate greed in New York City. The film ends with the notice before closing credits that on November 22, 1985 Joe Mauri was evicted from his flat near Fifth Avenue. The film uses the songs "Born in the U.S.A." by Bruce Springsteen, "Porpoise Mouth" by Country Joe and the Fish, etc.

== Production ==
The story of Joe Mauri was picked up for the film by Soviet journalist Iona Andronov when in September 1985, on New York's Upper West Side he spotted two women handing out flyers about Mauri. Some American publications had already covered Mauri's then-pending eviction.

== Reception ==
The film was broadcast on Soviet television in 1986 in primetime and was widely discussed by Moscow residents.

According to a contemporary review by The New York Times, the film "was consistent with the common Soviet portrait of America as a corrupt, immoral society torn by racial tensions and economic inequities and controlled by ruthless capitalists" while New York City is shown "as a modern Gomorrah, focusing on the misery of the homeless, the squalor of Times Square and the presence of prostitution, drug addiction, pornography and poverty".
