= Old-fashioned Tricks =

- Russian: Проделки в старинном духе
- Directed by: Aleksandr Pankratov
- Written by: Aleksandr Pankratov; Andrei Strekov; Aleksei Tolstoy
- Starring: Darya Mikhaylova; Vladimir Samoilov; Nikolay Trofimov; Mikhail Kononov; Aleksey Nesterenko
- Cinematography: Grigoriy Belenkiy
- Music by: Mark Minkov
- Release date: 1986
- Country: Soviet Union
- Language: Russian

Old-fashioned Tricks (Russian: Проделки в старинном духе) is a 1986 Soviet comedy film directed by Aleksandr Pankratov. It is based on a story by Aleksey Nikolayevich Tolstoy.

== Plot ==
A cunning swindler, after reading a letter about the death of an old aunt, visits retired hussar Nikolai Kobelyov under the guise of his nephew, hoping to benefit from an inheritance. However, Kobelyov is disappointed to learn that his aunt left him nothing, dashing his hopes of a much-needed fortune of 100,000 rubles. With his recent attempt to marry his son to the daughter of a wealthy neighbor already thwarted by their poor finances, the swindler proposes a scheme: they’ll pretend he received the inheritance to secure the marriage. The plan works, but the strong-willed bride decides to test her suitor’s love with a staged kidnapping at the altar.

== Cast ==
- Darya Mikhaylova
- Vladimir Samoilov
- Nikolay Trofimov
- Mikhail Kononov
- Aleksey Nesterenko
- Boris Bachurin
- Valentin Golubenko
- Gleb Plaksin
- Mariya Shashkova
- Tatyana Shashkova
