= Attack (1986 film) =

1986 film by Igor Nikolayev

- Russian: Атака
- Directed by: Igor Nikolayev
- Written by: Vasiliy Solovyov; Vladimir Vozovikov
- Starring: Sergey Chekan; Aleksandr Novikov; Vasili Popov; Valeri Tsvetkov; Svetlana Konovalova
- Cinematography: Vyacheslav Zvonilkin
- Music by: Aleksei Nikolayev
- Release date: 1986
- Running time: 89 minute
- Country: Soviet Union
- Language: Russian

Attack (Russian: Атака) is a 1986 Soviet drama film directed by Igor Nikolayev.

The film is about a graduate of a tank school who chooses Karakum, believing that it will be easier on the battlefield than at school.

== Plot ==
Upon graduating from a tank academy, Lieutenant Timofey Ermakov is stationed in the Karakum Desert. The film depicts Ermakov's transition from academic training to the operational demands of a frontline tank regiment. Set during the Soviet-Afghan War, the narrative follows Ermakov as he manages a T-62 tank platoon, with his approach to military discipline and training influenced by the ongoing casualties reported from the conflict in Afghanistan

Ermakov’s ambition to incorporate real combat experience into platoon training—rather than relying on outdated drills—is met with resistance from his superiors, from company to division commanders, as well as from the district’s commanding officer, who chastises him in front of Ermakov’s mother, a prominent journalist. His commanders, subordinates, and his mother, misinterpret his methods as ego-driven rather than aimed at creating skilled tankists capable of adaptive thinking in combat.

Meanwhile, Ermakov develops a relationship with Annagul, the commanding officer of the officers' quarters and widow of a fallen tanker. Initially dismissive of him as an “arrogant, self-assured junior officer with a reckless streak,” she gradually warms to him.

When the division is put on alert for exercises, Ermakov's company encounters “enemy” tank columns. After the company commander is “eliminated” in a simulated airstrike, Ermakov takes charge, demonstrating tactical skill by successfully "destroying" the enemy battalion. At the same time, the “southern” division hypothetically deploys nuclear weapons. Lacking communication with higher command, Ermakov proceeds with the mission, accidentally “taking down” helicopters carrying the division commander of the “southern” forces. His actions derail the pre-planned exercise scenario, revealing the limitations of rigid military doctrines against Ermakov’s Suvorov-inspired tactical approach.

Leading his company in a sacrificial “assault” on enemy missile launchers, Ermakov’s unit symbolically “destroys” tactical nuclear weapons. The exercise mediator is forced to halt the simulation, acknowledging Ermakov’s true command abilities. The district commander and Ermakov’s mother arrive to find him resting with his exhausted crew beside their tank, showcasing the young lieutenant's dedication and potential.

== Cast ==
- Sergey Chekan as Timofey Yermakov
- Aleksandr Novikov as Igor Linyov
- Vasili Popov as Pavel Prokhorovich Ordyntsev
- Valeri Tsvetkov
- Svetlana Konovalova as Tatyana Savyelyeva
- Dilorom Igamberdyyeva
- Oleg Avetisov
- Viktor Chebotaryov
- Sergei Isavnin
- Oleg Demidov
