= Sozvezdie (film festival) =

Russian film festival

- Location: Yaroslavl, various cities in Russia
- Started: 1989
- Founded by: Evgeny Zharikov, Russian Film Actors Guild
- Language: Russian

Sozvezdie (Russian: Созвездие or Кинофестиваль Созвездие), also known as Sozvezdie International Film Festival and International Actors Festival Sozvezdie, is a Russian film festival based in Yaroslavl. Meaning "Constellation", this film festival is also referred to as an "Actor's Film Festival". It gives awards to actors in various categories.

It was founded by Evgeny Zharikov in 1988, president of the Guild of Actors of Soviet Cinema, with the first edition of the festival being held in 1989.

== History ==
Sozvezdie was founded by Evgeny Zharikov, who was President of the Guild of Actors of Soviet Cinema From 1988 to 2000 (known as Russian Film Actors Guild from 1991). As of August 2022 The first festival was held in 1989.

The 7th edition of the festival was held in May 1995, and was attended by actor and director Dmitri Zolotukhin.

In 1999, 2000 (11th edition), and again in 2001 Sozvezdie was held in Arkhangelsk.

The 19th edition of the event was held in 2011 at Kostroma, where Belarusian films were shown.

== Governance and description ==
The festival is organised by the Russian Film Actors Guild and called "Constellation" in English. Only film and theatre actors participate in the selection committee, jury and in the competition, which is described as "a serious show of acting works". The festival is based in Yaroslavl.

In 1999, Sergey Zhigunov was president of the festival.

As of 2008, actor Alexander Goloborodko was president.

At the 19th edition in 2011, Vladimir Korenev, a People's Artist of the Russian Federation and an actor of the Moscow Drama Theatre K. S. Stanislavsky, was chair of the festival.

=== Categories ===
As of August 2022, the categories listed by IMDb are:

- Best Acting Ensemble
- Best Acting Ensemble Award
- Best Actor Award
- Best Actress Award
- Best Debut
- Best Debut Award
- Best Episodic Actor Award
- Best Episodic Actress Award
- Best Episodic Role Award
- Best Female Debut Award
- Best Male Debut Award
- Best Supporting Actor Award
- Best Supporting Actress Award
- Lifetime Achievement Award
- Special Prize of the President of the Jury
- Stuntmen Guild Prize

== Some past winners ==
In 1989, Elena Mayorova won the Prize for Best Actress, for her performance in Fast Train (1988).

In 1989, Fountain (1988), directed by Yuri Mamin and written by Vladimir Vardunas , won the prize for best ensemble cast.

Love (Lyubov, 1991), directed by Valery Todorovsky, won awards at Sozvezdie.

In 1993, Aleksei Serebryakov won a special award for his performance in Higher Measure.

In 1994, the 1993 Turkmenistan/Russian social drama directed by Uzmaan Saparov, Little Angel, Make Me Happy (Ангелочек, сделай радость, Angelochek sdelay radost), won the Grand Prix at Sozvezdie.

In 2001, actress Mariya Kuznetsova was commended for her role in Taurus, directed by Alexander Sokurov.

The Degraded Officer, aka The Demoted (Russian Razzhalovannyi) (2009), directed by Vladimir Tumaev, won prizes for acting at the festival in 2010.
