= Yuri Rost =

Photographer, journalist, author and traveller

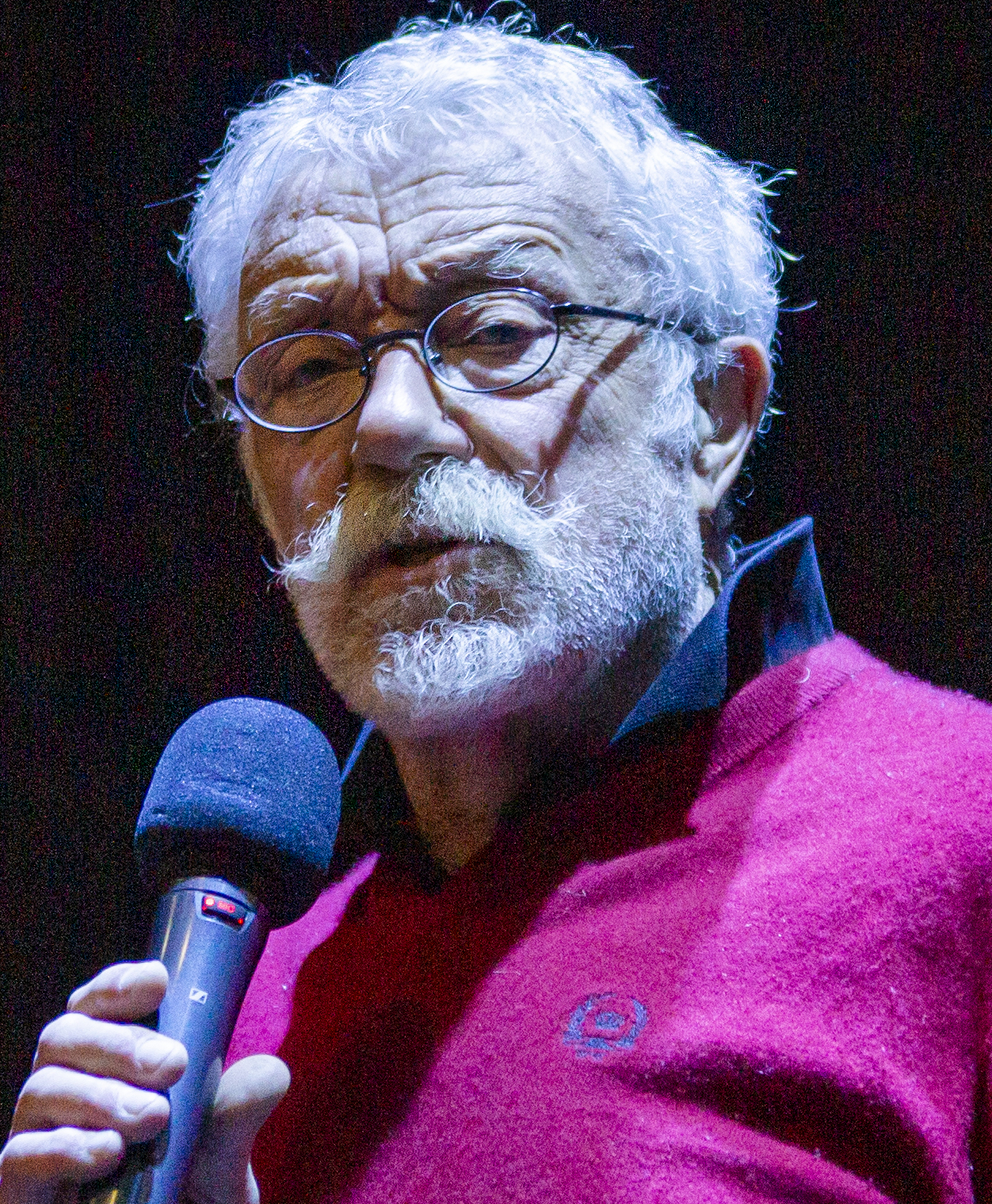
- Born: February 1, 1939 (age 87); Kiev, Ukraine
- Other names: Юрий Рост
- Occupations: Photographer, journalist

Yuri Rost (Russian: Юрий Рост, born February 1, 1939, in Kiev, Ukraine) is a photographer, journalist, author and traveller. Rost's photographic vision is closely related to the humanist tradition established by post-war photographers like Henri Cartier-Bresson, Leonard Freed, and Ed van der Elsken. He was selected by Henri Cartier-Bresson (1908–2005) for inclusion in his last exhibition, Les choix d’Henri Cartier-Bresson (Paris, 2003) after meeting him in Paris.

== Work ==
Yuri Rost has exhibited his works at galleries and museums worldwide. He is the author of numerous books and publications, and is one of the few recipients of Amarcord, a special award founded by Federico Fellini and Tonino Guerra, inspired by design of Sergei Paradjanov. In 2000, Rost was awarded the State Prize of Russia for his cycle of photographs "Group Portrait Against the Backdrop of the Century" ("Групповой портрет на фоне века"), as well as an independent national prize "Triumph – 2000", for his distinguished accomplishments in the visual arts and literature. In 2008, Rost's book "Group Portrait Against the Backdrop of the Century", based on the 2000 cycle of photographs, received the national "Book of the Year" award.

As a writer and social analyst, Rost gives his photographs an extra dimension by writing literary essays portraying and explaining the social context of the featured person. He focuses on peasants, tramps, actors and academics, treating them all with equal respect. Rost has created numerous photo portraits that became the iconic images of the major actors, performers, film and theater directors, musicians, writers, artists and liberal public figures of the day. For example, he has photographed poet Bella Akhmadulina, actress Faina Ranevskaya, ballet dancer Galina Ulanova, academician Dmitry Likhachov, and academician Andrei Sakharov.

== Life ==
A native of Kiev, Ukraine, Yuri Rost holds degrees from Leningrad State University and Kiev Institute of Physical Culture. In 1967–1979, he worked as a special correspondent for the newspaper "Komsomolskaia Pravda". From 1979, he worked as a columnist and photojournalist for the weekly periodical "Literaturnaia Gazeta". From 1994, he was the author of the TV program "Rost’s Stable" ("Конюшня Юрия Роста"). From 1995, he was a member of the board of trustees of the weekly newspaper "Obshchaya Gazeta". From 1997, he was a columnist and photojournalist for "Moscow News". Currently, Yuri Rost serves on the editorial board and as a columnist for "Novaya Gazeta" in Moscow.

== Books ==
- Yuri Rost (1989). Ein Blick in meine Sowjetunion (in German). Pendo. ISBN 978-3-85842-158-6.
- Yuri Rost (1990). Armenian Tragedy: An Eyewitness Account of Human Conflict and Natural Disaster. Weidenfeld & Nicolson. ISBN 978-0-297-79689-3.
- Yuri Rost (2007). Групповой портрет на фоне века (Group portrait on the background of the century) (in Russian). Moscow: AST. ISBN 978-5-17-040758-3.
