= Nina Yeryomina =

Russian basketball player

Personal information
- Born: 2 November 1933 Moscow, Russian SFSR, USSR
- Died: 24 August 2016 (aged 82) Moscow Oblast, Russia
Medals
Women's basketball
Representing Soviet Union
World Championships
Gold medal – first place	1959 Soviet Union	Team
European Championships
Gold medal – first place	1956 Czechoslovakia	Team
Gold medal – first place	1960 Bulgaria	Team

Nina Alekseevna Yeryomina (Russian: Ни́на Алексе́евна Ерёмина; 2 November 1933 – 24 August 2016) was a Russian basketball player and sports commentator. She was a 1959 world champion, two-time European champion, four-time Soviet Union champion and Merited Master of Sport of the USSR (1959).

== Biography ==
At the European Championships in 1960 in the three seconds before the end of the match against the Bulgarian national team, Eremina threw the ball, earning her the title of champion of the Soviet national team.

In 2000, she played herself in the movie The Envy of Gods.

She died on 24 August 2016 in Moscow Oblast.

== Awards ==
- Order of the Badge of Honour
- Medal For Labour Valour
- Jubilee Medal In Commemoration of the 100th Anniversary of the Birth of Vladimir Ilyich Lenin
- Merited Master of Sport of the USSR
