= Vladimir Molchanov =

Russian journalist (1950–2026)

- Владимир Молчанов
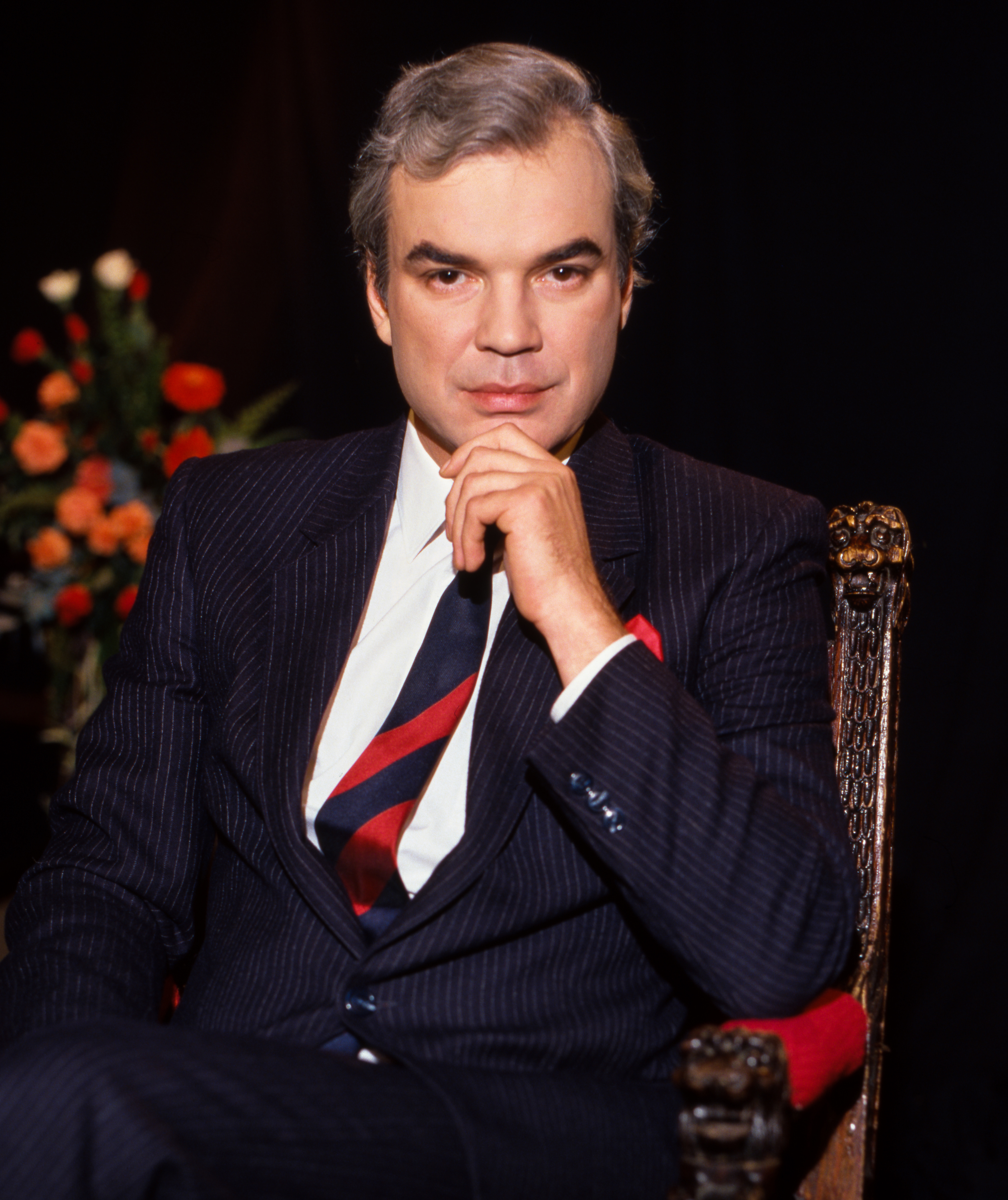
- Molchanov in 1991
- Born: 7 October 1950; Moscow, Russian SFSR, USSR
- Died: 11 May 2026 (aged 75); Moscow, Russia
- Education: Moscow State University
- Occupations: Television and radio host, speaker, journalist

Vladimir Kirillovich Molchanov (Russian: Владимир Кириллович Молчанов; 7 October 1950 – 11 May 2026) was a Soviet and Russian television and radio host, speaker and journalist. He was a writer and host of the television program Before and After Midnight in the late 1980s to early 1990s on Soviet television. Molchanov was a member of the Russian Television Academy from 1994, and head of the studio of the Faculty of Journalism at Moscow Institute of Television and Radio Broadcasting Ostankino.

== Background ==
Molchanov's parents were composer Kirill Molchanov, and actress Marina Dmitrieva-Pastukhova. His godmother was Olga Knipper, and his half-sister, Anna Dmitrieva, is a sports commentator. He was married to Cuban Consuelo Segura, a director. Molchanov also had a daughter, Anna, and grandson, Dmitry.

Molchanov died on 11 May 2026, at the age of 75.
