= Sergei Korzun =

- Сергей Корзун
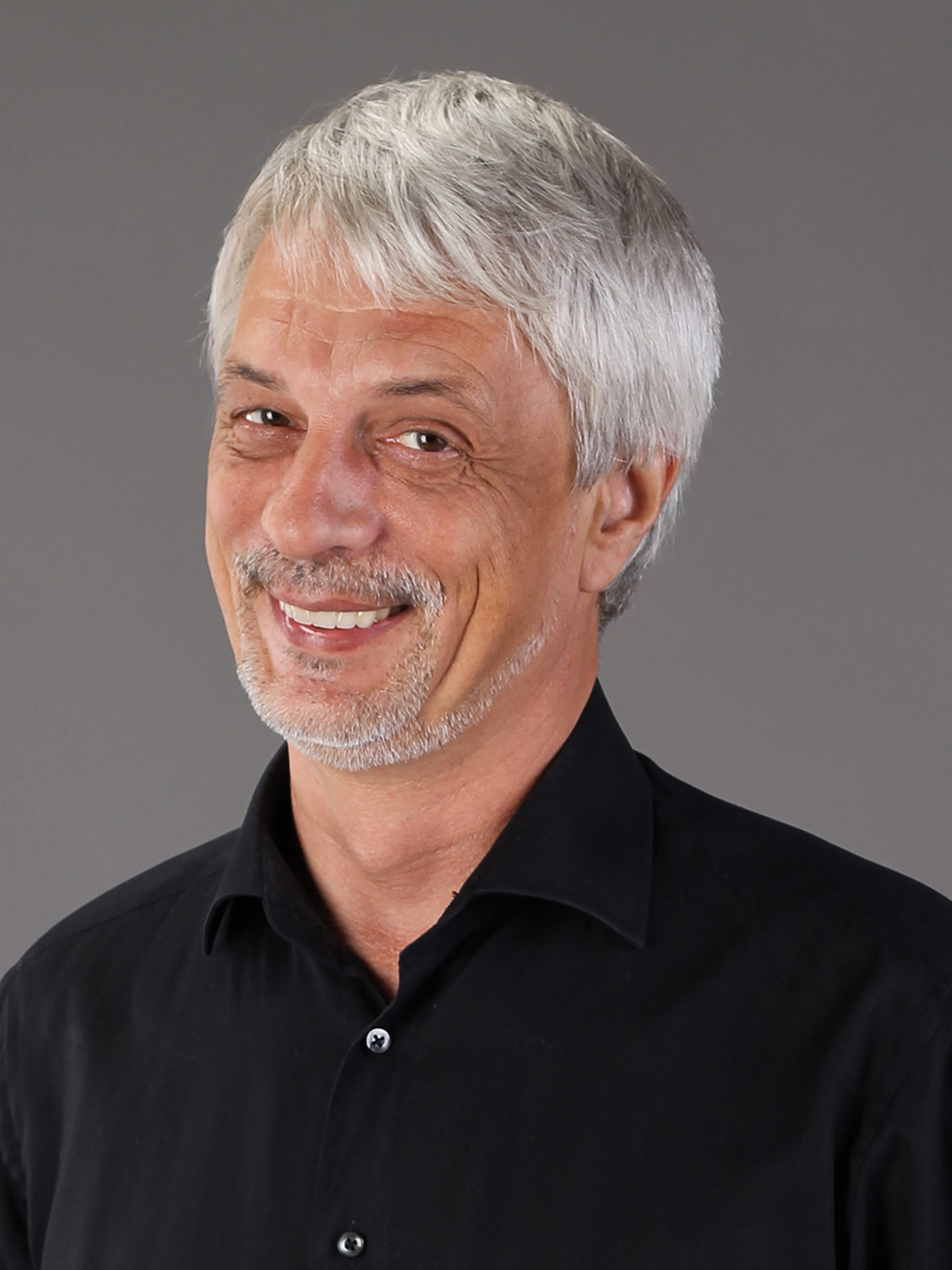
- Korzun in 2012
- Born: 14 February 1956 (age 70); Moscow, Soviet Union
- Education: State Pedagogical Institute of Foreign Languages
- Occupation: Journalist
- Years active: 1978 -
- Employer(s): Higher School of Economics; Ren TV
- Known for: Founder of Echo Moskvy
- Awards: Medal of the Order "For Merit to the Fatherland"

Sergei Lvovich Korzun (Russian: Сергей Львович Корзун; born February 14, 1956, Moscow, Soviet Union) is a Russian journalist, radio and television host, media manager, and producer. He was the founder and first editor-in-chief of Ekho Moskvy radio station (1990–1996), the creator and host of many radio and television programs, and a professor in the Department of Media at the Faculty of Communications, Media, and Design at the Higher School of Economics (2015–2023).

== Biography ==
From 1963 to 1969 he studied at the 24th Moscow special school, studying a number of subjects in French, in Lefortovo. From 1969 to 1973 - at school No. 68 with in-depth study of the French language (now No. 1248), in the Davydkovo region. In 1978 he graduated from the Faculty of French, Moscow State Pedagogical Institute of Foreign Languages. He was repeatedly a "fighter" of student construction brigades.

From 1978 to 1990 he worked as an announcer, then as a presenter of programs on the Foreign Broadcasting of the USSR State Television and Radio (French edition). In 1987, he starred in the first television play from the “Detective Game” series as a commentator on the Antenna 12 TV channel.

In August 1990, he founded and headed the radio station Echo Moskvy. In February 1996, he resigned from his post and until May 2015 he collaborated with the station as the host of a number of programs, including Minority Report and the author's No Fools, which were simultaneously aired on “Echo” and the RTVi channel.

In 1996, Korzun briefly hosted the ATV journalistic program Ivanov. Petrov. Sidorov on the RTR TV channel. In August of the same year, as part of cooperation with the television company REN-TV, he created on "REN-TV-7" his own program "Business", which talked about the main economic events of the week.

Since September 15, 1997, he has been the host of the daily journalistic program For and Against on the TV channel REN-TV-7.

From July to December 1998, he served as editor-in-chief of the news service of the television company REN-TV.

In July 1999, he became vice-president of OJSC TV Center for information and socio-political broadcasting. However, in October of the same year, after the chairman of the channel's board of directors Sergey Yastrzhembsky canceled the order signed by Korzun to remove the host of the “Facing the People” program Pavel Gorelov from the air, Korzun resigned as a sign of disagreement with this decision.

On November 8, 1999, he was appointed general producer of the Ekho Moskvy.

On June 23, 2001, the meeting of shareholders elected Sergei Korzun as a representative of the journalistic team to the board of directors of Radio Station Ekho Moskvy.

In 2002–2003 he served as editor-in-chief of the radio station “News on line 88.7 FM”. The radio station's information service was headed by Murat Kuriev, who previously worked for NTV.

In 2003–2004, he was the author and presenter of the ATV-PolitX Internet project (aired on the TV Center channel).

In 2004–2005 he served as chief correspondent of the Moscow bureau of Radio Liberty, host of the "Intelligence Secrets" program on the NTV channel.

Author of a number of films for the documentary series High-profile Case on REN-TV including Otto Skorzeny and The Mystery of the Death of Svyatoslav Fedorov).

In 2007–2009 he was the general producer of the radio station Business FM.

In 2009–2010 he was editor-in-chief of the Voice of Russia broadcasting to Europe and Latin America.

Since February 2010 he is general producer of the United Media Management Company.

From 2012 to 2014, he was the editor-in-chief of Setvizor Media CJSC.

In May 2015, he announced his resignation from Ekho Moskvy. The decision to leave was prompted by offensive remarks made by assistant editor-in-chief Olesya Ryabtseva in her blog on the Ekho Moskvy website about the opposition and the station's employees, to which editorial chief Alexei Venediktov failed to respond. He said that "The Ekho Moskvy we started in 1990 is no more. The body is still functioning, but 'brain death' has already occurred". According to a rating compiled by the company Medialogiya, Korzun's dismissal was "the most notable event in the media industry in May 2015".

Sergei Korzun attributed his first conceptual departure from Ekho Moskvy in 2002 to the authoritarianism of the radio station's director, Alexei Venediktov.

He is married and has three sons—Ivan, Nikita and Alexander, and a daughter, Ksenia.
