= The Holiday of Neptun =

NEPTUNE'S HOLIDAY
- Праздник Нептуна
- Directed by: Yuri Mamin
- Written by: Vladimir Vardunas
- Starring: Victor Mikhaylov; Veta Zhukhimovich; Victor Krivoruchko
- Cinematography: Yuri Mamin
- Edited by: Yuri Mamin
- Release date: 1986
- Running time: 89 minute
- Country: Soviet Union
- Language: Russian

The Holiday of Neptun (Russian: Праздник Нептуна) is a 1986 Soviet comedy film directed by Yuri Mamin.

== Plot ==
The club’s leader in the village of “Small Heels”, in an annual report to regional authorities, reported the progress of a traditional event, the celebration of Neptune’s winter holiday. This involved 150 "Polar Bear's", that is to say, fans of winter swimming. In fact the village did not contain even a single "Polar Bear". It turns out that it was a few years before when five geologists plunged into an ice-hole. At once, the head of the amateur initiative enrolled himself into the Polar Bear’s club, stating a membership of 5 people. In a few years he decided to increase this figure and wrote a one in front of five, which made it 15. And then, on a drunken binge, added a zero to the end. As a result, it turned out that in Small Heels, there lived 150 polar bears (half of the village) and each year they participated in the celebration of Neptune’s winter holiday, swimming in a hole at the local lake. And, considering that the celebration took place on New Year's Eve from December 31 to January 1, when everyone was celebrating New Year’s, no one had ever verified the story. And then, something unexpected and unpleasant happened: a delegation of Swedish "Polar Bears" arrived in the regional center wishing to learn about the extraordinary success of the Russian village and they decided to attend the next celebration of Neptune’s winter holiday.

And thus, the heroes of the film find themselves in this ridiculous, funny and dramatic situation.

== Cast ==
- Viktor Mikhailov
- Veta Zhukhimovich
- Victor Krivoruchko
