= Yuri Mamin =

Soviet and Russian film director

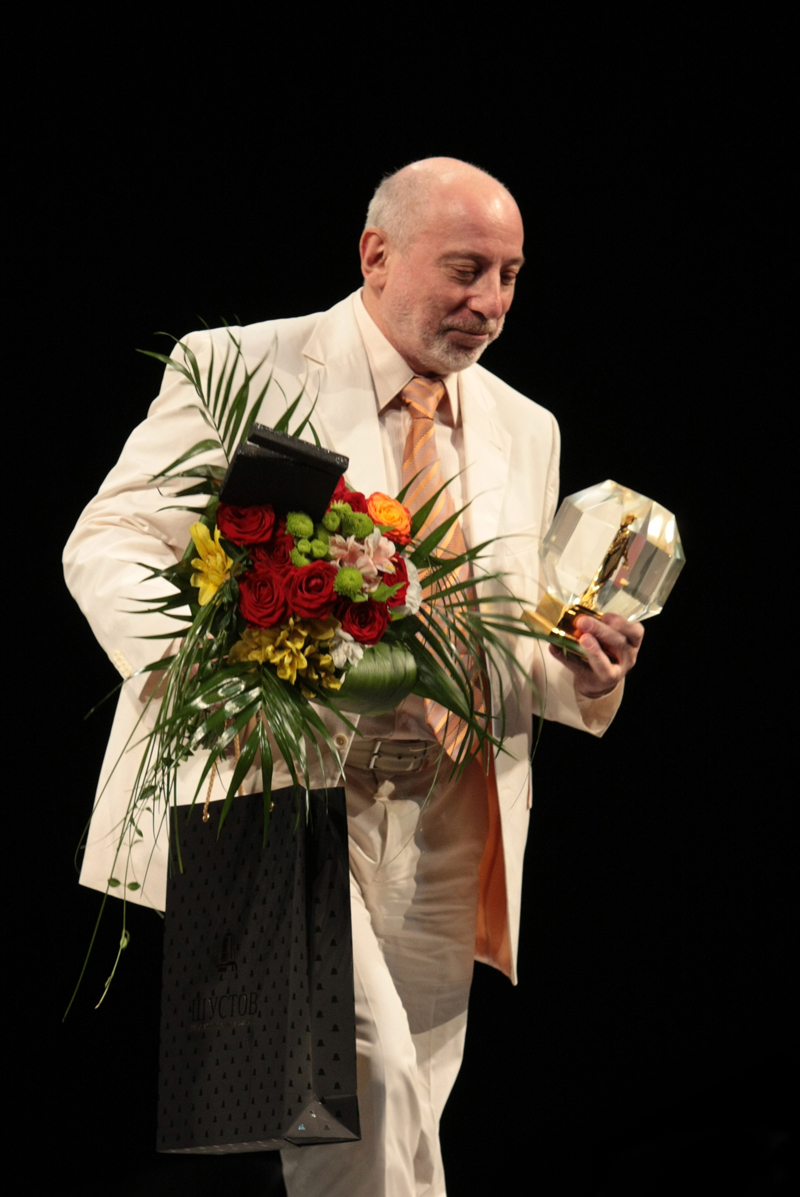
- Born: Yuri Borisovich Mamin (Soviet Union) Leningrad (now Saint Petersburg), Russian SFSR, USSR
- Occupations: Film director, Theatre director, Screenwriter, Composer, Author, Television host
- Years active: 1976 to the present
- Spouse(s): actress and producer Lyudmila Samokhvalova
- Children: actress and singer Katerina Ksenyeva
- Website: His YouTube channel

Yuri Mamin (Russian: Юрий Борисович Мамин) is a Soviet and Russian film director, stage director, screenwriter, composer, author and television host. He created a number of movies popular in Russia including Neptune's Feast (1986), Fontain (1988), Sideburns, (1990), Window to Paris (1993), and Don't Think About White Monkeys (2008). He is a Merited Artist of the Russian Federation.

Yuri Mamin is the only person in Russia to have won the Chaplin's Golden Cane award. The award was presented by Charlie Chaplin's widow, Oona Chaplin, at the festival marking 100 years since the birth of the great comedian. The festival was held in the Swiss city of Vevey, where Chaplin was buried.

Mamin's works are known for a strong emphasis on social justice and criticism of hypocritical social norms. Because of this, he found difficult to find support for his productions in the totalitarian USSR, as well as in today's Russia, where film makers became dependent on corporate oligarchy. His characters often portray an inspired citizen in the fight for social justice against corporate capitalism.

Mamin's films received numerous grand prizes and other awards.

== Personal life ==
=== Childhood and youth ===
Yuri Mamin's grandfather, Dmitry Dmitrievich Mamin, was the People's Commissar of the Petrograd river routes and a descendant of Northern Tatars. He was repressed and shot during Stalin's Great Purge in 1937. According to Yuri Mamin's maternal grandmother, his grandfather considered the writer Dmitry Mamin-Sibiryak a relative. Galina Dmitrievna Mamina, the film director's mother, was an art historian and theater worker who taught theater history at the Leningrad Higher Trade-Union School of Culture. Several of her students became directors of concert halls and heads of Departments of Culture.

Yuri Mamin inherited his Tatar surname from his mother. His stepfather, Nikolai Nikolaevich Chizhov, was a famous player for the Football Club Zenit in the beginning of the 1950s. Many years later, Mamin would name the main character of his film "Window to Paris" after his father.

=== Student life ===
Immediately after graduating from high school, Yuri applied for the theater directing course at the Leningrad Institute of Theater, Music and Cinematography.

At that time, young people aged 25 years and older were accepted into the directing program, but not of younger age. It was considered, and rightly so, that directors could only be people with life experience, practice working with people, and a cultural knowledge base. But professor Leonid Fyodorovich Makaryev, a People's Artist of the USSR, liked the 18-year-old boy who, at a colloquium, boldly answered questions about theater, film and literature, Peter Brook and existentialism - a result of his mother's teaching.

An exception was made, and Mamin was accepted into an experimental acting-directing course, where budding directors studied alongside budding actors. They worked on all acting skills, including voice, dance, fencing, etc. Additionally, from the first year on they studied how to put on sketches, fragments and entire plays with their classmates. During his collaborative study at the institute, Mamin gained confidence in both acting and directing skills, participating in student revues and in plays on the stage of the old Young Spectator's Theatre (TUZ).

For his graduation play, Yuri Mamin was sent to the regional city of Velikiye Luki, where he was commissioned by the leaders of the local drama theater to direct Denis Fonvizin’s comedy "The Minor" for a high school program. Having decided to follow in the footsteps of his idol, Vsevolod Meyerhold, Mamin directed "The Minor" in such an uninhibited manner and with so much eccentricity, that the teachers forbade their students from seeing the play, which caused a frenzy in the city. The play was a resounding success and Mamin's name became famous well beyond the confines of the theater and the city. The Regional Committee discussed a possible position for him as director of the theater. Perhaps it could have happened, and that prestigious position would have tied the young director to the stage career for a long time, if not forever. However, at that time Mamin received his draft notice from the army. He was sent to serve in the Armed Forces and never returned to Velikiye Luki again.

== Stage director career ==
After having served his military conscription term, Mamin was demobilized. He returned to Leningrad, where no one but his family was waiting for him. The circumstances were not easy; all the director positions in city theaters were filled. The only opportunity was Lenconcert, where the director's position had just become available. Since Mamin had already worked with this organization before his military service and had delivered to them a variety show that received an award at the All-Russian Competition, Yuri was hired. During his theater career, he adapted modern and classical works of literature for the stage and led the student theater "Podorozhnik" along with the poet and dramatist Vyacheslav Leikin, who would later become the screenwriter for some of Mamin's films.

=== The Kremlin Chimes ===
In 1994, when Mamin already became a famous film director, he staged a new theatrical play, "Kremlin Chimes, or Come to Us After... Many Years", at the Theater on Liteiny in Saint Petersburg. Mamin wrote this play together with Arkadi Tigai. In the play there are two Lenins, played by Viktor Sukhorukov and Aleksandr Zhdanov.

Perhaps, in this play Yuri Mamin wished to return to his youth; "Kremlin Chimes" was abundant with jokes and gags. Dmitry Bykov came twice to Moscow to see this play that he considered one of the best examples of modern satire, as he remarked in his radio program on City FM.

== Film career ==
In 1976, Yuri Mamin made a life-changing decision. After leaving Lenconcert, he entered Lenfilm as a director's assistant on a film crew for Sergey Mikaelyan's movie "Victory Day" ("Widows"). The second director of the film was Viktor Aristov, Mamin's friend from the theater institute, who had already worked in film for 10 years. Mamin says that Aristov became for him like "Virgil for Dante who guided him through the unknown world of cinematography".

After working as an assistant on a few movies, Mamin entered the two-year higher course for directors and screenwriters in Moscow. In that year, three workshops were organized: one by Eldar Ryazanov, who focused his workshop on screenwriting, one by Georgi Daneliya and one by Nikita Mikhalkov. In total, twelve students were enrolled in the group, including Ivan Dykhovichny, Vladimir Khotinenko, and Isaak Fridberg. At this time period, from 1979 till 1982, which became an important milestone in Soviet cinematography, the courses offered a uniquely eclectic curriculum that included philosophy lectures by Merab Mamardashvili and history classes by Natan Eidelman. Among other lecturers were the art critic P. Volkova and film directors Alexander Mitta, Leonid Trauberg and Andrey Tarkovsky who left the USSR after a long period of participation as a teacher.

=== I Wish You ===
Mamin's final coursework, which received the highest grade, was the film "Желаю Вам. Провинциальная сказка" ("I Wish You! A Provincial Tale"), based on a screenplay written by V. Leikin.

Before starting an independent director career, Mamin also co-directed Viktor Aristov film "Gunpowder", timed to coincide with the 50th anniversary of the World War II Victory.

=== The Holiday of Neptun ===
In 1985, a meeting with the talented screenwriter Vladimir Vardunas, a playwright whom Mamin compares to Gogolian, had determined the fate of both cinematographers.

The first collaborative satirical film of Mamin and Vardunas "Neptune’s Holiday" (1986) became immediate popular. Attendees at the Fifth Congress of Soviet Filmmakers and at writer and journalist conventions responded vigorously to Mamin's work, calling it "the first film of Perestroika".

"Neptune’s Holiday" was honored with a number of professional film prizes, including the Golden Ducat award in Mannheim (1986) and the Charlie Chaplin Great Award in Gabrovo (1987).

=== Fountain ===
Mamin's philosophical film Fountain (1988), written by Vladimir Vardunas, was unanimously chosen for first prize at the first International Film Festival "Golden Duke" in Odesa. The judging panel, led by Eldar Ryazanov, consisted of the satirist Mikhail Zhvanetsky, journalist Vitaly Korotich, composer Nikita Bogoslovsky and artist Ilya Glazunov.

In 1989, Mamin won the Chaplin's Golden Cane Award for Fountain in Vevey, Switzerland, the second Chaplin award in Gabrovo, Bulgaria, as well as numerous other awards at different international film festivals.

The actors of the film - Viktor Mikhailov, Sergey Dreiden (Dontsov), Ivan Krivoruchko, Lyudmila Samokhvalova, Zhanna Kerimtaeva and Nina Usatova - won the prize for the best ensemble cast at the "Constellation" (Sozvezdie) film festival.

=== Bakenbardy ===
In 1990, Mamin released the film "Bakenbardy" ("SIDEBURNS"), written by V. Leikin, a brutal Brechtian farce about a fanatical "national-Pushkinist" scholar and his clique, who were obsessed with nationalist ideas and the poetry of Alexander Pushkin. This film was made in a time of rampant nationalism in Russia.

"Bakenbardy" received the prestigious FIPRESCI Award at the film festival in San Sebastian, Spain.

=== Window to Paris ===
"Window to Paris" (1993) is the most famous of Mamin's works, which remains highly popular in Russia. It combines elements of science fiction, romance and sharp social satire. While sharply criticizing demoralized Russian nouveau riche and wannabe businessmen who humiliate the intelligentsia, it is a romantic story about a Russian musician who discovers an interdimensional portal and suddenly ends up in Paris together with his drunk roommates. In turn, a French woman, played by Agnès Soral, ends up in decaying slums of Saint Petersburg.

=== Rains in the Ocean ===
In 1994, after the death of his friend, film director Viktor Aristov, Yuri Mamin completed Aristov's film "Rains in the Ocean". In that year the film received two awards at the film festival Kinoshok for innovative directing and best actress.

=== Television shows ===
Mamin's return to the stage was not caused by nostalgia, but by the inability to continue working in cinematography. The government had halted funding the creation of films, and private commercial firms did not support cinema. During this period, movies were shot on cheap, low-grade film, which by international standards would be considered trash.

Because of this situation, Yuri Mamin moved to television at the end of 1994 and began hosting educational, humorous, musical and original TV programs such as "From Forte to Piano" and "Chameleon" for the channel RTR, appreciated by artists and popular among the intelligentsia.

=== "Gorko!" ===
In 1997 Mamin was approached by private investors to film a funny, non-satirical, entertaining comedy about weddings.

Together with his closest associates, including Vladimir Vardunas and Arkady Tigai, they came up with a screenplay for a film consisting of ten funny short stories about brides.

The film was released in theaters in 1998, and won the award for best comedy film at the festival "Window to Europe" in Vyborg, Russia.

=== Grim Tales From Russia ===
From 2000 to 2003, Yuri Mamin's spirit of social activism was embodied in the independent satirical television series Grim Tales From Russia, which was similar to the American series X-Files, but projected into Russian reality. The producer of the series was Ali Telyakov, a young businessman who had previously worked with Yuri Mamin on other TV programs.

The series Grim Tales From Russia, which totaled eighteen episodes, was shown on the federal channel STS. The series was so radically different from the other projects on the channel that the management could not decide when the series should be shown. Finally, a "wise" solution was found: the series was aired at night when the majority of viewers were sleeping.

However, the population in the Russian regions to the east of Moscow greatly appreciated the originality of Grim Tales From Russia. The director said that multitudes of his fans kept pestering him during the following years asking for the full series. Finally, the Saint Petersburg company Bomba-Piter released the series on DVD in 2009, which immediately led to their appearance on file sharing websites.

=== Don't Think About White Monkeys ===
In 2005, Yuri Mamin's wife, actress and producer Lyudmila Samokhvalova, and their daughter, Katerina Ksenyeva, convinced the distinguished film director to return to the big screen. They found investors who supported his socially critical film "Don’t Think About White Monkeys," written together with Vladimir Vardunas and rendered into verse by the poet Vyacheslav Leikin. The film has a second name, given in the captions: "Chaldean Face."

The financial support for the film was obtained slowly, with long breaks in between; the work stopped for months at a time on more than one occasion. For that reason, the director, as an experienced, skilled worker capable of fulfilling tasks within a tight schedule, had been working on this film for over three years.

However, if not for the financial support of a few honorable people - successful Russian businessmen - the film would never have been finished. Nevertheless, it was completed in 2009 and was successfully shown at a number of film festivals. The film opened in limited release.

Even before its release, the film was fiendishly stolen by criminals who produced infringing DVDs and distributed the film illegally on the Internet, thus causing great financial difficulties for the film's sales in Russia. Nevertheless, after having won two prestigious grand prizes at international film festivals in England and Morocco (Rabat), western distributors became interested in the film. It is slated to be dubbed into English by the famous British sound engineer Ray Gillon.

Notably, it will be the first time in the history of cinema that a Russian film in verse will be translated poetically into English verse.

The film premiered successfully in the United States (New York and Minneapolis), France, Portugal, Lithuania, Ukraine, Canada and Germany.

The mystical ballad "Insomnia", sung in the film by the actress Katerina Ksenyeva, is very popular with its listeners.

Yuri Mamin's film "Don’t Think About White Monkeys" won the first prize at the first ever online film festival, “Double 2”, organized by the Russian Gazette ("Rossiyskaya Gazeta").

== Current work ==
Today, Yuri Mamin conducts a master studio for directors of screen entertainment at the Saint Petersburg Institute for Television, Business and Design. He regularly holds professional classes in Russia and abroad.

In addition, he is the creator and host of the educational program "House of Culture" on the Saint Petersburg channel TV-100, where he speaks on the defense of citizen rights, about the values of world culture, and about the protection of the environment and of animals in grave danger of extinction in Russia.

Yuri Mamin is a member of the International Tibet Support Network. He is also a member of the Society for the Protection of Animal Rights and is a staunch opponent of hunting.

The TV program "House of Culture" is run in an interactive fashion whereby Yuri Mamin engages in direct discussions with viewers on matters of public concern.

Besides the aforementioned program, Yuri Mamin released the satirical TV journal “Shards” (“Oskolki”). Seven episodes of “Shards” appeared on TV-100 in 2010.

Yuri Mamin has a number of new film projects in the works, including "Window to Paris 201…", "Rockman" and "Dangerous Resemblance".

In 2011, during one of his visits to the US, Yuri Mamin taught at Middlebury College.

== Awards ==
- 1982 Award at the Film Festival of Young Cinematograthers in Kyiv (I Wish You)
- 1986 Golden Ducat Award at the International Film Festival in Manheim, Germany (Neptune's Holiday)
- 1987 Grand Prize at the International Film Festival in Gabrovo, Bulgaria (Neptune's Holiday)

Grand Prizes at film festivals in Moscow, Kyiv and Tbilisi, 1988-1989 (Neptune's Holiday)

- 1988 Grand Prize at the International Film Festival "Golden Duke" in Odesa, Russia (Fountain)
- 1989 Grand Prize at the International Film Festival in Gabrovo, Bulgaria (Fountain)
- 1989 Grand Prize at the International Film Festival in Sanremo, Italy (Fountain)
- 1989 Grand prize at the International Film Festival in Quimper, France (Fountain)
- 1989 Prize for best ensemble cast at the Film Festival “Sozvezdie” (“Constellation”), Russia (Fountain)
- 1990 Grand Prize at the International Film Festival in Belfort, France (Fountain)
- 1990 Grand Prize at the International Film Festival in Las Vegas, United States (Fountain)
- 1990 Grand Prize at the International Film Festival in Tróia, Portugal (Fountain)
- 1990 Chaplin's Golden Cane Award in Vevey, Switzerland (Fountain)
- 1991 Grand Prize at the International Film Festival in Torremolinos, Spain (Fountain)
- 1991 FIPRESCI Award in San Sebastián, Spain (Bakenbardy)
- 1993 Award for directing at the festival "Kinoshock" (Window to Paris)
- 1994 Award at the festival “Kinotavr” (Window to Paris)
- 1994 Grand Prize at the festival "Golden Ostap" (Window to Paris)
- 1994 Audience Award at the International Film Festival in Berlin (Window to Paris)
- 1995 UNESCO prize (Window to Paris)
- 1998 Award for best comedy film at the Vyborg Film Festival ("Gorko!")
- 2008 Jury Award for best Russian film by the International Federation of Film Societies at the International Film Festival in Moscow (Don't Think About White Monkeys)
- 2008 Award for innovation in the genre at the film festival "Smile, Russia!”, Russia (Don't Think About White Monkeys)
- 2009 Grand Prize at The End of the Pier International Film Festival, England (Don't Think About White Monkeys)
- 2009 Grand Prize at the International Film Festival in Rabat, Morocco (Don't Think About White Monkeys)
- 2009 Special Diploma from the jury for best actress to Katerina Ksenyeva at the International Film Festival in Rabat, Morocco (Don't Think About White Monkeys)
- 2011 Grand Prize at the Russian Gazette's First International Internet Film Festival “Double 2” (Don't Think About White Monkeys)

== Interesting Facts ==
Yuri Mamin says that inherited a gift of music and leadership qualities from his mother, a talented pianist, and his grandfather "who was the life and soul of every party". At first, he wanted to become a pianist and study at a conservatory, but he broke his arm in a street fight and had to give up his dreams of a professional musical career. However, Mamin served in the military orchestra of a missile unit. Later he told that his experience as a military musician helped him to understand better the Soviet system and the history of his country. His theatrical work "One Day in the Life of a Conscript Soldier, A Musician in a Brass Band" was presented to Eldar Ryazanov as an entrance exam for Ryazanov's workshop of comedy film. Ryazanov liked the work and subsequently accepted Mamin.

In his youth, when Mamin studied at the theater institute, he met the actress Lyudmila Samokhvalova who remains his wife and lifelong creactive partner. He says that due to her influence he decided to switch from theater to film career. She also advised him to take the higher course for directors and screenwriters.

== Quotes ==
- To me, movies are musical works of art, and I create them according to the laws of music, which is, in essence, the most perfect of all things produced by the human mind and heart. (Yuri Mamin)

- You used to raise builders of communism, now you are raising builders of capitalism, but the product remains the same: a brute, a know-nothing and a thief" (says Nikolai Chizhov, the teacher of music and literature, angrily to the business managers of the lyceum; Window to Paris)

- You were born in a terrible time in a poor, devastated country. But it is your country, after all! Don't you want to make it better? (says the same teacher, Chizhov, to his students on the steps of the Sacré-Cœur Basilica in Paris; Window to Paris)

- Patriotic films may be understood in different ways. It is possible to make colorful trash with a multi-million dollar budget drawn on government funds acquired through an acquaintance with the prime minister. But it is also possible to make something like all Mamin's films: coming from the soul, touching the heart and forcing you to think, without flattery and hypocrisy, sometimes hurtful, somewhat ugly and unpleasant, but always truthful and honest, scathing and passionate, in the spirit of such great artists as Nikolai Gogol and Mikhail Saltykov-Shchedrin, Alexander Pushkin and Vladimir Korolenko, Leo Tolstoi and Maxim Gorky. For this one needs to have a pure soul and to be a deeply decent person, citizen and humanist. This is how Yuri Mamin will be remembered in the history of cinematography.

== See also ==
- Yuri Mamin filmography
- Cinema of Russia
- Cinema of the Soviet Union
