= List of films set around New Year =

This is a list of films set on or around the New Year of the Gregorian calendar.

== Action ==
- Assault on Precinct 13 (2005)
- Beyond the Poseidon Adventure (1979)
- Friday Foster (1975)
- Poseidon (2006)
- The Poseidon Adventure (1972)

== Comedy ==
- Are We There Yet? (2005)
- Bachelor Mother (1939)
- Bloodhounds of Broadway (1989)
- Carnival Night (1956)
- Down and Out in Beverly Hills (1986)
- Every Day's a Holiday (1937)
- Four Rooms (1995)
- Get Crazy (1983)
- Ghostbusters II (1989)
- The Gold Rush (1925)
- The Hudsucker Proxy (1994)
- The Passionate Thief (1960)
- It Happened on Fifth Avenue (1947)
- Junior Miss (1945)
- My Big Night (2015)
- New Year's Day (2001)
- No Surrender (1985)
- Operation Happy New Year (1996)
- Operation Petticoat (1959)
- Party Party (1983)
- Radio Days (1987)
- Trading Places (1983)
- Whatever Works (2009)

== Comedy-drama ==
- 200 Cigarettes (1999)
- Bridge and Tunnel (2014)
- Diner (1982)
- For Keeps (1988)
- Forrest Gump (1994)
- Happy New Year (1973)
- Happy New Year, Colin Burstead (2018)
- Highball (1997)
- The Holdovers (2023)
- Ladies in Black (2018)
- A Long Way Down (2014)
- Mermaids (1990)
- Metropolitan (1990)
- More American Graffiti (1979)
- New Year's Day (1989)
- One Night Stand (1984)
- Peter's Friends (1992)
- Room for One More (1952)
- Starter for 10 (2006)
- Surviving New Year's (2008)
- Sweet Hearts Dance (1988)

== Crime/caper/heist ==
- After the Thin Man (1936)
- Better Luck Tomorrow (2002)
- Dick Tracy (1990)
- Dhoom (2004)
- Entrapment (1999)
- The Godfather (1972)
- The Godfather Part II (1974)
- Happy New Year (1987)
- Little Caesar (1931)
- Money Train (1995)
- Ocean's 11 (1960)
- Poor Sasha (1997)
- A Simple Plan (1998)

== Disaster ==
- Beyond the Poseidon Adventure (1979)
- Ground Control (1998)
- Poseidon (2006)
- The Poseidon Adventure (1972)
- The Poseidon Adventure (2005)
- Y2K (1999)
- Y2K (2024)

== Drama ==
- 54 (1998)
- Baby Face (1933)
- Boogie Nights (1997)
- Carol (2015)
- Cavalcade (1933)
- The Divorcee (1930)
- Fruitvale Station (2013)
- Home Before Dark (1958)
- I'll Be Seeing You (1944)
- I Never Promised You a Rose Garden (1977)
- Looking for Mr. Goodbar (1977)
- Middle of the Night (1959)
- My Reputation (1946)
- The New Year (2010)
- New Year's Eve (1929)
- One Way Passage (1932)
- The Passionate Friends (1949)
- Penny Serenade (1941)
- Phantom Thread (2017)
- Pollock (2000)
- Il Posto (1961)
- Rocky (1976)
- Rocky II (1979)
- Splendor in the Grass (1961)
- The Stud (1978)
- 'Til We Meet Again (1940)
- Two Lovers (2008)
- Ulysses' Gaze (1995)
- Yanks (1979)

== Film noir ==
- Backfire (1950)
- Repeat Performance (1947)
- Sunset Boulevard (1950)
- Walk Softly, Stranger (1950)

== Horror ==
- Angel Heart (1987)
- Antisocial (2013)
- The Bees (1978)
- Bloody New Year (1987)
- Break (2019)
- The Children (2008)
- Day Watch (2006)
- Dead of Winter (1987)
- End of Days (1999)
- Ghostkeeper (1981)
- Holidays (2016)
- Iced (1988)
- The Mephisto Waltz (1971)
- Mystery of the Wax Museum (1933)
- New Year's Evil (1980)
- The Phantom Carriage (1921)
- The Phantom Carriage (1958)
- Rosemary's Baby (1968)
- The Shining (1980)
- The Signal (2007)
- Terror Train (1980)
- V/H/S/99 (segment "To Hell and Back") (2022)

== Musical ==
- An American in Paris (1951)
- Bundle of Joy (1956)
- Carnival Night (1956)
- Get Crazy (1983)
- Holiday Inn (1942)
- New Year Adventures of Masha and Vitya (1975)
- Rent (2005)

== Romance/romantic comedy ==
- About a Boy (2002)
- About Last Night (1986)
- About Last Night (2014)
- An Affair to Remember (1957)
- And So They Were Married (1936)
- The Apartment (1960)
- Baby Cakes (1989)
- Bachelor Mother (1939)
- Bridget Jones's Diary (2001)
- Café Society (2016)
- Can't Buy Me Love (1987)
- Come Look at Me (2001)
- Desk Set (1957)
- Holiday (1938)
- The Holiday (2006)
- Holiday Affair (1949)
- How to Be Single (2016)
- I Hate New Year's (2020)
- In Search of a Midnight Kiss (2008)
- The Irony of Fate (1976)
- The Irony of Fate 2 (2007)
- It's Love I'm After (1937)
- Last Holiday (2006)
- Made for Each Other (1939)
- The Moon's Our Home (1936)
- New Year's Eve (2011)
- Remember the Night (1940)
- The Rose Bowl Story (1952)
- Sex and the City: The Movie (2008)
- Sleepless in Seattle (1993)
- Someone Like You (2001)
- Untamed Heart (1993)
- When Harry Met Sally... (1989)
- While You Were Sleeping (1995)
- Yolki (2010)
- Yolki 2 (2011)
- Yolki 3 (2013)
- Yolki 1914 (2014)
- Yolki 5 (2016)

== Science fiction ==
- Alien Nation: Millennium (1996)
- Black Lightning (2009)
- Doctor Who (1996)
- The End of Evangelion (1997)
- Iron Man 3 (2013)
- Snowpiercer (2013)
- Strange Days (1995)
- The Time Machine (1960)

== Thriller ==
- Bitter Moon (1992)
- Night Train to Paris (1964)
- Survivor (2015)
- Taboo (2002)
- Under Suspicion (2000)

== See also ==
- New Year's Eve
- New Year's Day
