= Yolki =

- Theatrical release poster
- Directed by: Timur Bekmambetov; Yaroslav Chevazhevskiy; Ignas Jonynas; Dmitriy Kiselev; Aleksandr Voytinskiy
- Written by: Dmitriy Aleynikov; Andrey Kureychik; Oleg Malovichko; Givi Shavgulidze
- Produced by: Timur Bekmambetov; Iva Stromilova; Sergey Yahontov
- Starring: Alina Bulynko; Sergey Pokhodaev; Ivan Urgant; Sergey Svetlakov
- Narrated by: Konstantin Khabensky
- Cinematography: Sergei Trofimov
- Edited by: Andrey Mesnyankin
- Music by: Pavel Yesenin
- Production company: Bazelevs
- Release dates: 13 December 2010 (Kazakhstan); 16 December 2010 (Russia)
- Running time: 90 minutes
- Country: Russia
- Language: Russian
- Budget: $3 million
- Box office: $25 million

Yolki (Russian: Ёлки, meaning New Year Trees), also known as Six Degrees of Celebration, is a 2010 Russian comedy film directed by Timur Bekmambetov. As of 2024, eleven films have been made in the series. It is the most successful non-animated film franchise in Russia.

The films in the series represent a Russian tradition of the New Year's Movie where films that take place during the holiday season tap into the vein of hope, optimism, and possibility associated with New Year's in the Russian culture. Other examples include The Irony of Fate and The Irony of Fate 2 (also directed by Bekmambetov). Typically such films are released in December, just before the start of the holidays in Russia.

== Plot ==
The film takes place in 11 different cities in Russia and tells the story of a series of different characters whose acquaintance is purely coincidental. The characters find themselves on New Year's Eve in difficult situations which they can only escape if they find help, by miracle or through six degrees of separation. According to this theory all the people on Earth are connected through six handshakes.

The film begins in Kaliningrad, the last city in Russia to celebrate the New Year. The story revolves around a local orphanage during the holiday. One orphan girl Varya, makes other children believe that her father is the Russian president. They promise to stop harassing her if her father blesses her with an encrypted message during the traditional televised New Year's Address. She does not know what to do, and her friend Vova tries to help and tells her about the Six Degrees of Separation theory. The characters in the film are a student, a thief and his connections with the policeman who caught him, a taxi driver in love with a famous pop singer, a businessman rushing to his beloved, two snowboarders. And so with the Caucasian snow cleaner at the Red Square, Varia's request is passed on to the Russian president who notices the encrypted message written on the snow in the Kremlin courtyard. On the New Year's Eve, the phrase "Santa Claus helps the one who helps himself" appears in the president's speech (Dmitri Medvedev makes a cameo appearance), thus verifying the theory of six degrees of separation.

== Cast ==
- Alina Bulynko as Varvara
- Sergey Pokhodaev as Vova
- Ivan Urgant as Boris Vorobyov
- Sergey Svetlakov as Evgeniy Pavlovich
- Elena Plaksina as Olya
- Vera Brezhneva as herself
- Nikita Presnyakov as Pasha Bondarev, cab driver
- Boris Khvoshnyansky as Fyodor
- Artur Smolyaninov as Aleksey
- Sergey Garmash as Valery Sinitsyn, police captain
- Ekaterina Vilkova as Alina
- Baimurat Allaberiyev as Yusuf
- Dmitry Medvedev as the President of Russia (himself)

== Sequels ==
The film has had the sequels Yolki 2 in 2011 and Yolki 3 in 2013 with most of the cast reprising their roles, as well as a prequel called Yolki 1914 in 2014.

A spin-off was released in 2015, titled Paws, Bones & Rock'n'roll. It was centered around the dogs which appeared in Yolki 3.

In 2016 Yolki 5 was released and in 2017 Yolki 6.

In 2018 Yolki 7 was released.

In 2021 the film Yolki 8 was released.

The film Yolki 9 was released at the end of 2022 and became a soft reboot of the series.

In 2023 Yolki 10 was released.

As of 2018, Yolki 3 is the most profitable film of the series.
