= Yolki 7 =

2018 film directed by Timur Bekmambetov

- Directed by: Zhora Kryzhovnikov; Dmitriy Kiselev; Alexander Karpilovsky; Alexei Nuzhny; Alexander Kott
- Written by: Zhora Kryzhovnikov; Yulia Gulyan; Dmitri Litvinenko; Egor Chichkanov; Ivan Petukhov; Artur Pinkhasov
- Produced by: Timur Bekmambetov; Zhora Kryzhovnikov; Galina Strizhevskaya; Maria Zatulovskaya
- Starring: Ivan Urgant; Sergey Svetlakov; Dmitry Nagiev
- Narrated by: Konstantin Khabensky
- Cinematography: Ivan Lebedev; Levan Kapanadze; Semyon Yakovlev; Sergei Trofimov
- Music by: Pavel Yesenin; Yuriy Poteyenko; Ilya Lagutenko; Vladimir Osinsky; Sergey Kashirin
- Production company: Bazelevs
- Release date: December 27, 2018
- Running time: 85 minutes
- Country: Russia
- Language: Russian

Yolki 7 (Russian: Ёлки последние, romanized: Yolki poslednye, meaning The Last Christmas Trees) is a Russian comedy film, which is the seventh in the Yolki franchise, not counting the spin-off Paws, Bones & Rock'n'roll (2014). It premiered on December 27, 2018. The seventh film premiered on December 27, 2018. Yolki 7 received mixed reviews, which were lower than the previous film. Despite the title (The Last Christmas Trees), Yolki 8, a sequel to the seventh film, was released in 2021.

== Plot ==
The film illustrates the new adventures of the heroes of the famous franchise on the eve of the New Year. The Snow Maiden rescues a lonely grandfather; The hipster from Tyumen helps Uncle Yura correctly make an offer to his lover; Boris does everything possible to make his friend Zhenya to not return to Yakutia; Perm sportsmen dream to see the smile of a beautiful girl and they are ready to put on the ears of the whole city, and an ordinary resident of Voronezh goes to the capital to meet the man of his dreams - actor named Komarovsky.

== Cast ==
- Ivan Urgant - Boris Vorobyov
- Sergey Svetlakov - Evgeniy
- Dmitry Nagiyev - Yury Semyonovich Vnukov
