= Galina Konshina =

Soviet and Russian actress

- Born: Galina Pavlovna Konshina; 17 December 1951 (age 74); Barnaul, Altai Krai, RSFSR, USSR
- Occupation: Actress
- Years active: 1955–present
- Awards: Meritorious Artist of the Russian Federation (2001)

Galina Pavlovna Konshina (Russian: Гали́на Па́вловна Ко́ньшина; born December 17, 1951, Barnaul) is a Soviet and Russian theater, cinema, television and stage actress

== Biography ==
Galina Konshina was born on December 17, 1951, in Barnaul. In fact, Galina was born on December 6, but because of forty-degree frosts, her father went to issue a certificate of her birth only on December 17.

In school years she was engaged in amateur art activities and went to drama school. Quite early, she began to parody neighbors, teachers, as well as popular pop singers Klavdiya Shulzhenko and Maya Kristalinskaya.

In 1974 she graduated from the acting department of the Russian Academy of Theatre Arts (GITIS) (workshop of Vsevolod Ostalsky).

Having received a diploma of theater and film actresses, together with her husband, director Yuri Nepomnyashchy, they created the Theater of Little Comedies, in which they played both one-act French plays and comedy and sharp-screen miniatures of Russian authors. The theater traveled the whole former USSR with a tour, but in 1987 it was closed.

In 1979 she took part in the All-Union Competition of Variety Artists, the main award (the third prize, since the first two prizes were not awarded), which she shared in the speech genre with Yan Arlazorov.

From 1988 to 1994 she starred in the comic TV show Anshlag.

From 1990 to 2001 — Artist of the Moscow Concert Association Estrada.

In 1993-1996 she played in the Moscow Communion State Drama Theater.

Galina Konshina received nationwide fame after participating in the Channel One Russia parody show Big Difference, where she parodied Jorge Garcia, Marina Golub, Tatyana Tolstaya, Tatyana Tarasova, Nonna Mordyukova, Yelena Malysheva, Valeria Novodvorskaya, Ada Rogovtseva, Ekaterina Starshova, Yelena Stepanenko, and other famous people, deserving recognition and love five.

Also in different years she starred in the programs Around the Laughter, Smekhopanorama, The Cup of Humor, Grouse-Show. He actively acts in films, tours in Russia with entrepreneurial performances.

== Selected filmography ==
- Blood for Blood (1991) as episode
- Wood Grouse (2008—2009) as Olga Alekseevna, Head of the International Bureau
- Daddy's Daughters (2009—2010) as Roza Lvovna
- Univer (2009) as teacher
- All Inclusive (2011) as woman who keeps repeating
- Yolki 2 (2011) as Natalya, Olya's mother
- Zhukov (2011) as Larisa, fashion designer
- Lavrova`s Method (2011) as Irina Borisovna Lokteva
- Paws, Bones and Rock'n'roll (2015) as Nastya's grandmother
- #SenyaFedya (2018) as apartment owner

== Personal life ==
The first husband is a fellow student on GITIS, director Yuri Nepomnyashchy. From this marriage there is a son Anton. The second husband is musician Yuri Shumidub, 14 years younger than Galina.
