= Yolki 6 =

2017 Russian comedy film

- Directed by: Zhora Kryzhovnikov; Dmitriy Kiselev; Alexander Karpilovsky; Alexei Nuzhny; Alexander Kott
- Written by: Zhora Kryzhovnikov; Yulia Gulyan; Dmitri Litvinenko; Egor Chichkanov; Ivan Petukhov; Artur Pinkhasov
- Produced by: Timur Bekmambetov; Zhora Kryzhovnikov; Galina Strizhevskaya; Maria Zatulovskaya
- Starring: Ivan Urgant; Sergey Svetlakov; Dmitry Nagiev
- Narrated by: Konstantin Khabensky
- Cinematography: Ivan Lebedev; Levan Kapanadze; Semyon Yakovlev; Sergei Trofimov
- Music by: Pavel Yesenin; Yuriy Poteyenko; Ilya Lagutenko; Vladimir Osinsky; Sergey Kashirin
- Production company: Bazelevs
- Release date: December 21, 2017
- Running time: 85 minutes
- Country: Russia
- Language: Russian
- Budget: $3 186 000
- Box office: $15 857 385

Yolki 6 (Russian: Ёлки новые, romanized: Yolki novye, meaning Christmas Trees New), is a 2017 Russian comedy film, the sequel to Yolki 5. It stars Ivan Urgant, Sergey Svetlakov, Dmitry Nagiyev, Elena Yakovleva and Yulia Aleksandrova and was widely released in Russia on December 21, 2017.

The film had a mixed reception by viewers and critics. The plot, special effects and replacement actors were criticized, but the acting and humor were positively assessed. The film grossed almost 15 million dollars at the worldwide box office, with a budget of 3 million dollars. The seventh film, Yolki 7, was released in 2018.

== Plot ==
=== Segment "Pines" ===
High-school hipster Andrei (Daniela Vakhrushev) goes to the forest with his mother's boyfriend Yuri Semyonovich (Dmitry Nagiev), employee of the Ministry of Emergency Situations, to fetch a Christmas tree. In order to strengthen their new family, Yuri teaches the boy how to survive in the wild. Some of the dangers in the forest include NATO soldiers and bears.

=== Segment "Pregnant Snow Maiden" ===
Pregnant Marina (Yuliya Aleksandrova) moonlights as Snow Maiden to earn enough money to be able to give birth in a paid hospital. Marina has broken up with the father of her unborn child because of his infidelity. She convinces a repairman from Kyrgyzstan to dress up as Santa Claus and help her in her Snow Maiden act. They travel around Nizhny Novgorod on a tractor. The "Snow Maiden" also ends up helping get a student's (Taisiya Vilkova) life in order, who is also expecting.

=== Segment "Doctor" ===
Galya (Valentina Mazunina), an overweight airport employee, steals handcuffs from her policeman father. She is unrequitedly in love with Denis (Anton Bogdanov), an attractive doctor-intensivist. Denis is romantically involved with his beautiful co-worker, and is about to propose to her.

Galya decides to literally chain herself to Denis at his place of work so that they will never be apart. Denis calls the police, but the police officer who arrives to the scene, turns out to be Galya's father who refuses to remove the handcuffs. Denis' girlfriend ends up rejecting his marriage proposal, and advises him to pursue Galya instead. After all these misadventures, Denis starts to develop romantic feelings for Galya.

=== Segment "Fire victims" ===
Evgeniy's (Sergei Svetlakov) apartment is burnt down when he attempts to bake for his family. Evgeniy, together with his family and the ill-fated bread machine, move in with his friend Boris (Ivan Urgant). The new inhabitants make a mess at the new apartment and everyone ends up feeling cramped. Evgeniy again tries to bake bread with disastrous results.

=== Segment "Mama" ===
Schoolboy Yegor (Danil Muravyov-Izotov), brought up by his widowed father Viktor (Sergei Puskepalis), puts up a video online which goes viral; in it he expresses his wish to find a new mother. He runs away from his home in Khabarovsk and flies all the way to Moscow to meet with a possible candidate - Ksenia (Ekaterina Klimova), a sentimental news anchor from the NTV channel. Despite being engaged, she ends up developing romantic feelings for Yegor's father.

== Cast ==
- Ivan Urgant - Boris Vorobyov
- Sergey Svetlakov - Evgeniy
- Dmitry Nagiyev - Yury Semyonovich Vnukov
- Yuliya Aleksandrova - Marina, pregnant Snow Maiden
- Anton Bogdanov - Denis Evgenievich, doctor
- Valentina Mazunina - Galya
- Elena Yakovleva - Andrey's mother
- Sergei Puskepalis - Viktor Orlov, Yegor's father
- Ekaterina Klimova - Ksenia Lastochkina, TV presenter
- Andrey Burkovsky - Igor, the jealous fiancé of Xenia
- Anfisa Chernykh - Katya, nurse
- Vladislav Vetrov - Captain Chebotaryov
- Irina Arkhipova
- Alisa Sapegina - Olga, wife of Boris
- Daniil Izotov - Yegor Orlov, the boy who seeks his mother
- Daniil Vakhrushev - Andrey, a freshman
- Taisiya Vilkova - Julia
- Andrey Nazimov
- Evgeniy Romantsev
- Vadim Rudenko - seller of Christmas trees
- Andrey Yurtaev
- Vladimir Matveev - father of Evgeniy
- Natalia Potapova - mother of Evgeniy
- Imran Chelabiyev - son of Bori
- Gennady Turantayev - Father Frost
