= V2. Escape from Hell =

2021 Russian war film

- Theatrical release poster
- Directed by: Timur Bekmambetov; Sergei Trofimov
- Written by: Maxim Budarin; George Selegey; Konstantin Galdaev; Ilgiz Zainiev; Alexander Devyataev (Creative consultant)
- Based on: Escape from Hell by Mikhail Devyatayev
- Produced by: Timur Bekmambetov; Igor Mishin (ru); Igor Ugolnikov (ru); Evgenia Aronova; Timur Asadov
- Starring: Thure Riefenstein; Pavel Priluchny; Darya Zlatopolskaya; Pavel Chinarev; Evgeny Serzin; Dmitry Lysenkov; Timofey Tribuntsev; Patrick Joswig
- Cinematography: Elena Ivanova
- Music by: Yuri Poteyenko
- Animation by: Alexey Gusev (CG Supervisor)
- Layouts by: Eldar Karkhalev (Production designer); Sergey Struchev
- Production companies: Bazelevs Company; Columbia Pictures
- Distributed by: Sony Pictures Releasing
- Release dates: 22 April 2021 (Moscow International Film Festival); 29 April 2021 (Russia)
- Running time: 118 minutes
- Country: Russia
- Language: Russian
- Budget: $10 million

V2. Escape from Hell (Russian: Девятаев, romanized: Devyatayev) is a 2021 Russian prison action thriller war biopic film directed by Timur Bekmambetov. The film stars Thure Riefenstein, Pavel Priluchny, Pavel Chinarev and Darya Zlatopolskaya. Based on a true story, portions of Soviet Mikhail Devyatayev's autobiography form the basis of a World War II film produced by Bazelevs Company. The film is the first large-scale vertical format film featuring dynamic aerial combat. Mikhail Devyatayev enrolled at the Soviet Air Forces to fight in the Great Patriotic War. In July 1944, while on a sortie for the 1st Ukrainian Front, his plane was shot down and he was captured by the Wehrmacht. In the most difficult conditions, Devyatayev managed to develop and implement an escape plan from Hitler's heavily guarded Usedom prison, which used prisoners to build the V-2 rocket. The film had a wide release on 29 April 2021.

== Plot ==
Summer 1944. The Soviet troops are on the offensive, but the enemy remains formidable. During a battle with German fighters, Soviet pilot Mikhail Devyatayev is shot down over enemy territory and is captured. Now he faces a choice: die in a concentration camp or return to the skies—albeit on the Germans' side. The pilot chooses a third option: escape. But how can one hijack a plane from a heavily guarded military base where the Nazis are developing retribution weapons capable of altering the war's outcome at the eleventh hour? The film is based on real events—the story of Mikhail Devyatayev, Hero of the Soviet Union, who made a daring escape from a German concentration camp.

== Cast ==
- Thure Riefenstein as Kommandant Berghoff
- Pavel Priluchny as Mikhail Devyataev
- Darya Zlatopolskaya as Faya, Devyatayev's wife
- Pavel Chinarev as Nikolai Larin, second in command pilot (Major)
- Evgeny Serzin as Sokolov
- Dmitry Lysenkov as Willie
- Timofey Tribuntsev as the barber at the Sachsenhausen concentration camp
- Patrick Joswig as Klaus
- Aleksey Filimonov as Ivan Korzh
- Nikita Kologrivyy as the Pock-marked

== Production ==
=== Adaptation from biographical material ===
The film is based on renowned Soviet Union fighter pilot Mikhail Devyatayev who managed to escape the most secret prison of the Nazis – Usedom, an island of the southern Balitc Sea. Devyatayev, the prisoner of war fled the Nazis through stealth and courage. The pilot brought along in the cargo of a hijacked aircraft, advanced ballistic designs of Hitler's "weapon of retaliation" – V-2 ballistic missiles and coordinates. The prisoner of war barely managed to come back home alive to the Soviet Union weighing only 36 kilograms. The blueprints turned the tide of World War II, as the Soviet command later captured the island fortress from the Nazis possibly saving the Soviet Union from the terrible fate of a future launch of the V-2 ballistics missiles. The missiles had the range to hit as far as North America and Moscow. The fugitives managed to obtain the exact layouts of the rocket launchers on the island, which helped the Allies to destroy the enemy's bases, and made the defeat of Nazis inevitable. Former prisoners of war, after healing from starvation, took part in the storming of Berlin; many of them died during the crossing of the Oder and fighting for the city. Of the group of prisoners of war who escaped with Devyateyev, only two survived to the end of the war, during the capture of Berlin or during the battles with Japan.

=== Filming ===
On February 13, 2020, it was announced that V2. Escape from Hell under the direction of Timur Bekmambetov was ready to go into production and become the first blockbuster film made entirely in portrait format. According to Quartz, the film heralds the age of vertically shot films. On March 18, 2020, Timur Bekmambetov was looking for remote filming methods during the crisis caused by the coronavirus in order not to stop production of the film.

Principal photography started in the pavilions of Lenfilm, Kronstadt, St.Petersburg (Siversky, a former military airfield) and Kazan in February 2020. Individual takes commenced with pilot actors inside the cockpits of Second World War fighter aircraft using military equipment. The film making tried to show rustic, crude, unrefined warfare such as a rusty aircraft. The famous hijacked plane, Heinkel He 111 H-22 from the escape at Usedom island in Germany was used for the film. It was recreated at the technical complex of the VoenFilm film studio. Full-sized replica of Airacobra aircraft were also used.

The aerial battles were shot using technology from the video game online military simulator War Thunder by Gaijin Entertainment. Bekmambetov always had the incentive for gamer-pilots cinematography ever since a test flight in the past kindled his interest in computer flight simulators that he would regularly experiment with. The game studio became a liaison to the production crew who chose virtual photography for the aerial battles. Only previously have game engines been used in Hollywood. For V2, filming moved beyond the standard method and did not resort to usual green screens. The cameras will be able to film only the pilots while the director will be able to stop the "battle" 1200 km away from the sound stage in St.Petersburg where the pilots were seated in a place cockpit surrounded by LED screens. The crew remotely adjusts the shots from a production room in Kazan giving them flexibility in adjustments and refinements using VFX.

=== Theatrical ===
The film was the opener of the 2021 Moscow International Film Festival held on 22 April 2021. On 27 April 2021, a memorial of Mikhail Devyatayev was held in Kazan. The film is co-produced by Bazelevs and Voenfilm. MTS Media also co-produced the film, the first in their theatrical production catalogue from the network provider. The film had a wide release in Russia on 29 April 2021 through distributor Sony Pictures Productions and Releasing (SPPR). VTB Bank acted as an official partner for the film. The film became one of the main premieres in April 2021. A special pre-premiere was held at Moscow Poklonka cinema. The Victory Museum also opened in Moscow that has an exhibition "Pilot Mikhail Devyataev. Life as a Feat" in commemoration for the film and Victory Day. A red carpet session was held in Yekaterinburg with the VIP guest being Till Lindemann. The May 2021 program of Moskino includes screenings of the film. The film will be released in English with a different opener showing the Luftwaffe raids against London.

=== Soundtrack ===
The score for the film is composed by Golden Eagle laureate Yuri Poteyenko. The Soviet Union pre-war song Lubimiy Gorod – Beloved City/Favorite City sung by Mark Bernes will have a modern reinterpretation in the film sung by Till Lindemann of the Rammstein Group. The German singer has an intricate history with the song ever since he heard of it as a child during the Soviet Union times while living in the city of Rostock in GDR. The idea to include the song was by the singer. The film crew noted a Favorite City theme song would be an apt leitmotif for the film. The music will also serve to "creates bridges between peoples." The song sounds both on the opening credits and in the course of the story. Russian singer Lev Leshchenko highlighted the performance of the song, "Favorite City" by Lindemann. The song was originally composed for the 1939 film The Fighters and has ever since been a classic rendition for Soviet Union singers. As part of the marketing for the film, actor Priluchny arranged a song flash mob for the title track which the actor himself sang for the film.

No.	Title	Lyrics	Music	Singer(s)	Length
1.	"Lubimiy Gorod"	Yevgeniy Dolmatovsky	Nikita Bogoslovsky	Till Lindemann (International); Pavel Priluchny	2:46

== Reception ==
=== Critical response ===
At the Moscow International Film Festival the film opened to critical acclaim. A review from Kommersant noted filming went online after its postponement due to COVID-19. The reviewer wondered, "How to engage in air combat for those who spend their days driving a piston-engined fighter in a computer game? How can I feel the azure sky by drawing it on the computer pixel by pixel?" The final verdict states, "The authors of Devyataev coped with almost all these tasks. At least in the escape scene, you empathize with the main characters as much as you do with Ocean's friends, and in the aerial episodes, the pace and turns make you squeeze into a chair while your lips inevitably sing Bernes – the romance of heavenly providence, fortunately, dilutes the usual harsh colors of concentration camp films."

A review from Kino-Teatr noted, "Devyataev is undoubtedly also inspired by Soviet classics, in particular the film The Fighters with Mark Bernes" and the techniques used evoke "the sensations can be compared to those that arose from the scenes with the hero of Tom Hardy in Christopher Nolan's Dunkirk." In the film, "Favorite City" enhances the action, "Not only the song that the hero of Priluchny first purrs in the cockpit at the most tense moments, and then sings Till Lindemann." Another review from KinoReporter by Katya Zagvozdkina also affirmed the film is like Dunkirk whose German bomber aircraft dogfights give the audience vertigo. Reviewers from KinoReporter to Intermedia have applauded the performance of Pavel Priluchny: "But the pilot is incredibly close to all of us – and for this conscientiously played humanity-a low bow to Pavel Priluchny, the very fact of whose appearance in this film is already akin to a sign of quality." A review at Film.ru noted the ending of the film could have been developed further adding in the missing years of Devyatayev as an outcast in the Soviet Union.
