= Bazelevs Company =

Russian production company

Bazelevs
- Type: Subsidiary
- Industry: Cinema
- Predecessor: Imperial Film
- Founded: 1991; 35 years ago
- Founder: Timur Bekmambetov
- Headquarters: Moscow, Russia (Russian HQ); New York, US (International HQ)
- Key people: Yva Stromilova (general producer); Sergei Ageyev (executive producer); Pavel Perepelkin
- Products: Motion pictures
- Services: Movie production special effects
- Divisions: Bazelevs Distribution; 3D Previz Studio
- Subsidiaries: Computer graphics advertising and film department
- Website: bazelevs.ru

Bazelevs is a US-based production company founded by Russian director and producer Timur Bekmambetov. The company has been producing films such as Night Watch, Day Watch, Wanted, The Darkest Hour, Abraham Lincoln: Vampire Hunter and Hardcore Henry.

The company was involved in producing the animated film 9, which was nominated for Best Animated Film in 2010 at the Producers Guild of America Awards 2009.

In the summer of 2010 in Moscow, they filmed the Russo-American projects The Darkest Hour, in cooperation with 20th Century Fox, New Regency, Summit Entertainment and Kikoriki. Team Invincible in cooperation with Columbia Pictures, in the United States with Bekmambetov as a producer.

In 2015, the company have since released films in a new format titled "Screenlife" which each film is shot in the point-of-view of computer screens and smartphones. The first couple films released in that genre are Unfriended, Unfriended: Dark Web, Searching and Profile.

== List of films produced by Bazelevs ==
- The Arena (2001)
- Night Watch (2004)
- Day Watch (2006)
- The Irony of Fate: Continuation (2007)
- 9 (2009; under Bazelevs Feature Animation)
- Wanted (2008)
- Chernaya Molnya (2009)
- Apollo 18 (2011)
- Lucky Trouble (2011)
- Kikoriki (2011)
- Yolki (2010)
- The Darkest Hour (2011)
- Yolki 2 (2011)
- Abraham Lincoln: Vampire Hunter (2012)
- Gentlemen, Good Luck! (2012)
- The Snow Queen (2012)
- Yolki 3 (2013)
- Yolki 1914 (2014)
- Yolki 5 (2016)
- Yolki 6 (2017)
- Paws, Bones & Rock'n'roll (2015)
- He's a Dragon (2015)
- Hardcore Henry (2016)
- The Age of Pioneers (2017)
- Yolki 7 (2018)
- The Current War (2019)
- V2. Escape from Hell (2021)
- Mercy (2026)

=== Screenlife ===
- Unfriended (2015)
- Profile (2018)
- Unfriended: Dark Web (2018)
- Searching (2018)
- Missing (2023)
- Bloat (2025)
- War of the Worlds (2025)
- LifeHack (2025)
