= Smak (TV program) =

- Country of origin: Russia

Original release
- Network: Channel One Russia
- Release: 20 November 1993 – 2022

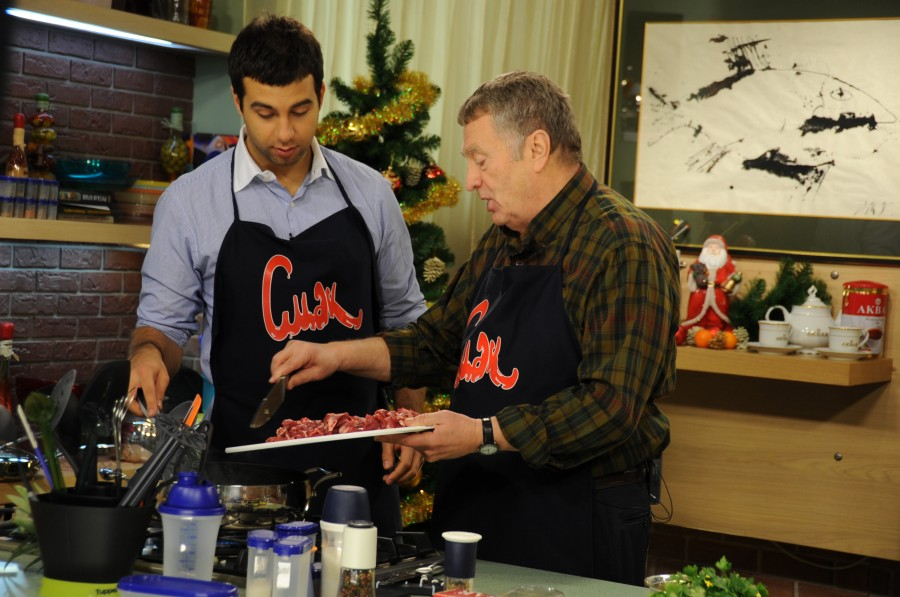
Ivan Urgant hosting Smak in 2008 with politician Vladimir Zhirinovsky as a guest

Smak (Russian: Смак) is a Russian culinary entertainment television program that airs on Channel One Russia. It debuted on 20 November 1993.

The first guest on the program was the actor Aleksandr Abdulov. In 1996, the guest on Smak was Chuck Norris, and in 2015 the show was attended by Til Schweiger. The kitchen studio has been visited many times by TV presenter Valdis Pelšs.

== Hosts ==
- 1993–2005: Andrey Makarevich
- 2006–2018: Ivan Urgant
- 2018–2022: Andrey Makarevich (on YouTube)
