= Alexander Kott =

Russian director and screenwriter (born 1973)

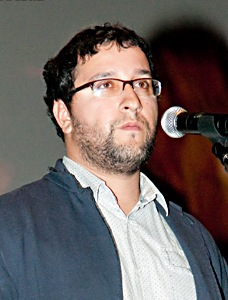

Alexander Konstantinovich Kott (Russian: Александр Константинович Котт; born 22 February 1973) is a Russian film director and screenwriter. He is the twin of the Russian film director Vladimir Kott.

== Selected filmography ==
=== Director ===
- A Hero of Our Time (2006) 8-episode TV series adapted from the eponymous novel by Mikhail Lermontov
- Fortress of War (2010)
- Yolki 2 (2011)
- Yolki 3 (2013)
- Yolki 1914 (2014)
- Test (2014)
- Insight (2015)
- Yolki 5 (2016)
- Yolki 6 (2017)
- Trotsky (2017) TV series
- Spitak (2018)
- Yolki 7 (2018)
- Yolki 11 (2024)
- Pavel. Pervyy i posledniy (2025) TV series
- Angels of War (2026)

== Personal life ==
His wife is actress Anna Tsukanova-Kott (born June 15, 1989). They have two children: a son Mikhail (born 2008) and a daughter Leia (born 2018).

Grandfather is Samuel Kasyanovich Kott (1905-1973). He is a native of the town of Korets. Samuel Kasyanovich was the secretary of the party committee of the Markov factory, commanded the anti-aircraft artillery platoon of the 1683rd artillery anti-aircraft artillery regiment of the 2nd Baltic Front and the training unit of the reserve of officers of the 51st Army, knight of the Order of the Red Star (1945).
