= Peshavar Waltz =

Peshawar Waltz
- Directed by: Timur Bekmambetov; Gennadi Kayumov
- Written by: Timur Bekmambetov; Gennadi Kayumov
- Produced by: Iskona Film
- Starring: Barry Kushner; Viktor Verzhbitsky; Aleksey Shemes
- Cinematography: Fyodor Aranyshev; Sergei Trofimov
- Music by: Alexander Voitinskyi
- Release date: 1994 (Russia)
- Running time: 86 minutes
- Country: Russia
- Language: Russian

Peshawar Waltz (Russian: Пешаварский вальс, romanized: Peshavarskiy val's) is a 1994 Russian action film directed and written by Timur Bekmambetov. The film is a depiction of the Afghan war based on the events of the Badaber uprising of prisoners of war 24 km south of Peshawar, Pakistan. An English dub of the film titled Escape from Afghanistan was released on home video in 2002. An American reporter and doctor (British and French in the original version) comes to a military base in Pakistan to document the P.O.W. conditions. While there, the Soviet prisoners rise up and take over the base.

== Plot ==
In May 1985, British journalist Charlie Palmer (Barry Kushner) and his friend, French doctor Victor Dubois (Victor Verzhbitsky), travel by jeep to a Mujahideen camp near Peshawar to interview Soviet soldiers held as prisoners. Palmer is investigating alleged punitive actions in which these prisoners may have participated. Some soldiers refuse to answer, while others speak of napalm and chemical weapons, leaving it unclear whether the exhausted prisoners are telling the truth or exaggerating in hopes of attracting Western interest.

Suddenly, the prisoners overpower the guards and take Palmer hostage. The rebels lack a concrete plan. They manage to reach a radio and broadcast a call for help, but Soviet authorities suspect it could be a provocation. An American advisor steps in, setting a 20-minute ultimatum and inviting the rebels to negotiate. Meanwhile, the prisoners remain divided over their next steps, and internal conflict escalates. As the ultimatum expires, Palmer, in despair, takes his own life. Moments later, helicopters approach. The prisoners suspect they are Soviet, but the missiles fired indiscriminately kill both the Mujahideen and the revolting prisoners alike.

== Awards ==
At the 29th Karlovy Vary International Film Festival, the film was nominated for the Crystal Globe and Timur Bekmambetov won the Best Director Award.

== See also ==
- Badaber Uprising
