= Sergei Svetlakov =

Russian comedian and actor

- Сергей Светлаков
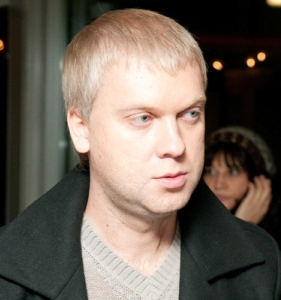
- Svetlakov in 2011
- Born: Sergei Yuryevich Svetlakov; 12 December 1977 (age 48); Sverdlovsk, RSFSR, USSR
- Occupations: Comedian; actor; television host; producer; screenwriter
- Years active: 1995–present
- Spouse: Antonina Chebortaeva

Sergei Yuryevich Svetlakov (Russian: Сергей Юрьевич Светлаков; born 12 December 1977) is a Russian comedian, film and television actor, TV host, producer, and screenwriter. He was a member of the KVN team "Ural Dumplings" from 2000 to 2009. Svetlakov is best known for appearing in the sketch-show Nasha Russia and his role as Evgeniy Pavlovich in the Yolki franchise.

== Life and career ==
Svetlakov was born in Sverdlovsk, Russian SFSR, Soviet Union (now Yekaterinburg, Russia), to Galina Grigorevna Galushko, a freight engineer on the Sverdlovsk Railway, and Yuri Venediktovich Svetlakov, assistant to the machinist, who worked at a milling plant.

He graduated from school number 2 in Yekaterinburg (now gymnasium number 155). In addition to studying, Svetlakov was engaged in football and basketball, later became a candidate for master of sports in handball. Such successes made him see his future only as related to sports. However, Sergei's parents insisted instead that he follow them in their professional activities.

In 2000 he graduated from the Urals State University of Railway Transport (Ural State Railway University) in Yekaterinburg, specializing in Economics of Railway Transport. In the university, a KVN team was organized in which Sergei became a captain due to the fact that he won in the "Knight of the Institute" competition. In the team, Sergei Svetlakov played for about two years - during this time the KVN became for him an occupation of utmost importance. Because of this, he had serious problems with his studies, but he did not receive expulsion form the university. While Svetlakov was finishing his studies at the university, he collaborated as a writer with the popular team "Ural pelmeni". Later he joined the team, already in 2000 his team became the champion of the Major League of KVN. Sergei Svetlakov was invited to the jury for the second 1/8 finals in 2004 of the KVN Major League. Although, he did not manage to make any assessments: at the end of the greeting of the "Dobryanka" team Sergei Svetlakov, following the calls of the actors who were playing on stage, began to dance, including at the judges' table, after which the guards withdrew him from the hall. As it later became known, this act, which looked like improvisation, was a pre-prepared part of the "Dobryanka" performance and was approved by the leader Alexander Maslyakov.

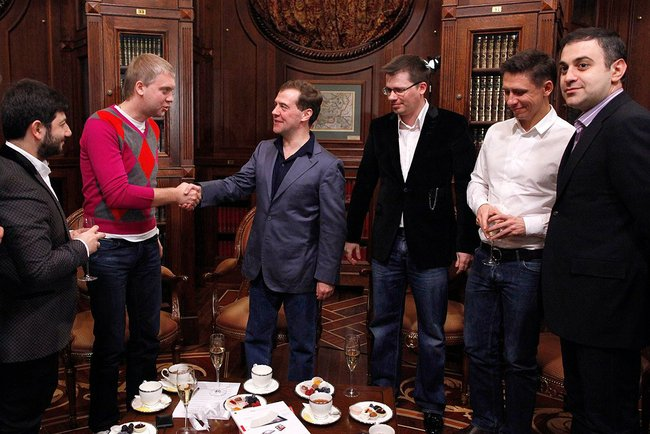
Sergei Svetlakov and other Comedy Club members meeting with Dmitri Medvedev

Having moved to Moscow, Svetlakov did not complete his cooperation with the KVN. Together with Garik Martirosyan, Semyon Slepakov, Arthur Tumasyan and Sergei Ershov, he wrote scripts for KVN teams. This creative team laid the foundation for the Comedy Club in Russia. Later Sergei took part in Nasha Russia which was released under the Comedy Club brand.

A great success for Svetlakov was the appearance in the program Prozhektorperiskhilton in 2008, along with other hosts - Ivan Urgant, Alexander Tsekalo and Garik Martirosyan (the program was one of the successful projects of the First Channel and received four TEFI awards).

In 2009, he left the team "Ural pelmeni" because he wanted to focus on his own projects.

In 2009-2010 Sergei was one of the main characters of the program "South Butovo".

Starting from 2010, Sergei appeared as Evgeniy Pavlovich in every film of the Yolki franchise. In 2016 he starred as Tolya in The Groom, of which he was also the writer and producer.

In November 2012, Sergei Svetlakov received a residence permit in Latvia and became the owner of a two-story house in Jurmala.

In 2022, Svetlakov did not support the Russian invasion of Ukraine.

== Selected filmography ==
=== Film ===
Year	Title	Role	Notes
2006-11	Nasha Russia		TV Series
2010	Our Russia. The Balls of Fate	Leonid, different roles	
2010	Six Degrees of Celebration	Evgeniy Pavlovich	
2012	Yolki 2	Evgeniy Pavlovich	
2012	Stone	Pyotr Naidyonov "Stone"	
2013	Kiss Them All!	cameo, wedding host	
2013	Yolki 3	Evgeniy Pavlovich	
2014	Yolki 1914	Evgeniy Pavlovich	
2014	Kiss Them All! 2	cameo	
2016	Yolki 5	Evgeniy Pavlovich	
2016	The Groom	Tolya	
2017	Yolki 6	Evgeniy Pavlovich	
2021	Love	Boris	
2017	Yolki 7	Evgeniy	
