= Lucky Trouble =

- Theatrical release poster
- Directed by: Levan Gabriadze
- Written by: Roman Nepomnyashchiy
- Produced by: Timur Bekmambetov; Pavel Korsakov; Iva Stromilova
- Starring: Konstantin Khabensky; Milla Jovovich; Ivan Urgant; Sergei Garmash; Vladimir Menshov
- Cinematography: Marat Adelshin
- Edited by: Timofey Goloborodko; Yana Kulikova; Evgeniy Ryzhonkov
- Production company: Bazelevs Company
- Distributed by: Walt Disney Studios Sony Pictures Releasing CIS
- Release date: February 17, 2011
- Running time: 97 minutes
- Country: Russia
- Language: Russian
- Budget: $7.8 million
- Box office: $12.8 million

Lucky Trouble (Russian: Выкрутасы, romanized: Vykrutasy) is a 2011 Russian comedy film, directed by Levan Gabriadze in his directorial debut.

The film premiered on February 17, 2011, and grossed $12.8 million by May 1, 2011.

== Plot ==
Vyacheslav "Slava" Kolotilov (Konstantin Khabensky) is a natural science teacher from a coastal Caspian village called Palchiki (diminutive of fingers) who is passing through Moscow seeking luck as a novelist without much success. Lost in thoughts he crosses a street and a car strikes him at high speed. Nadezhda (Milla Jovovich) is at the wheel with her fiancé Danil (Ivan Urgant). Vyacheslav escapes from the collision with just a broken leg. A crush develops between Slava and Nadezhda. Vyacheslav convinces her to cut off her engagement and they pledge to marry each other instead. The teacher, in addition to leaving his work must move to Moscow where the wedding will take place. However he hits a snag, on the same day that he must take the train the preparations for the Russian Youth Football Cup are taking place. He gets mistaken for a coach by the Tournament Supervisor (Vladimir Menshov), a Duma deputy, who takes his passport so that he is not able to escape.

Slava wants to leave as quickly as possible, he receives advice from Khlobustin (Sergei Garmash), coach of Central Moscow, to make sure that his team will lose. Desperate to reunite with his fiancée, he recruits a group of juvenile delinquents (after he catches one attempting to steal his mobile phone). He is certain that they do not have the sufficient expertise but they begin to demonstrate an innate ability to play football and win brilliantly to the despair of Kolotilov.

== Cast ==
- Milla Jovovich – Nadezhda (Nadya)
- Konstantin Khabensky – Vyacheslav Kolotilov (Slava)
- Ivan Urgant – Danila (Danya)
- Sergei Garmash – Khlobustin
- Vladimir Menshov – Member of Duma Tryokhgolovich
- Olga Tumajkina – Director of school
- Sergey Selin – Mayor
- Galina Jovovich – Nadya's mother Galina Aleksandrovna
- Tatyana Lyutaeva – Galina Aleksandrovna's friend
- Aleksandr Kerzhakov – Cameo appearance
- Levan Gabriadze – Guest at a wedding (Cameo appearance)
- Roman Madyanov – Inspector Road Patrol Service
- Aleksandr Robak – Boatswain
- Alexandra Nazarova – Nadya's Granny
- Taisiya Vilkova – Tasya

== Production ==
Initially the project was called Kolotilov. The film was not initially planned to be a romantic comedy, but the screenplay was altered at the late stage of production, when Milla Jovovich agreed to act in the film. Jovovich said in an interview that she agreed to act in the film because of her friendship with Ivan Urgant. Her scenes took ten days to film.

Russian-speaking Milla Jovovich voiced her role herself, and it was her first role in the language. Although half Russian, Jovovich moved to London as a child, which made her main language English, so she had some difficulties with learning her lines. Her mother, Galina Loginova, also appears in the film. She plays Galina Alexandrovna, Nadya's mother.

Most of the film was shot in Yeysk, Krasnodar Krai.

The first letters of the names of the actors who played in the film starring (Khabensky, Urgant, Jovovich) form an obscene word in Russian. In one of the trailers of the film, this is visible. For this reason, many cinemas refused to show the film's trailer.

== See also ==
- List of association football films
