= Baimurat Allaberiyev =

Tajikistani singer

Baimurat Allaberiyev Баймурат Аллабердиев
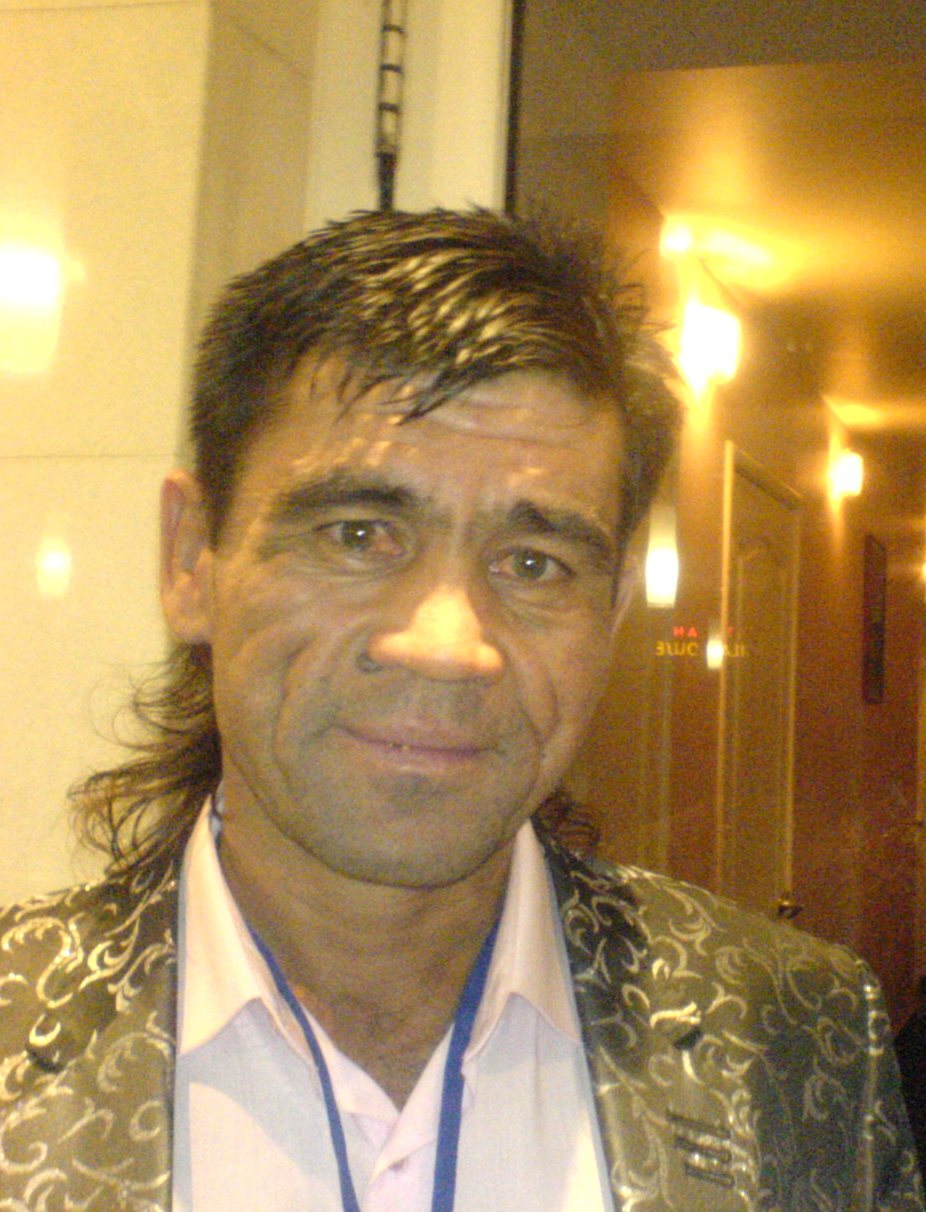
- Born: Oymahmad Saifuloevich Allaberiyev; 20 February 1971 (age 55); Kushoniyon District, Tajik SSR, Soviet Union
- Occupations: Vocalist; musician
- Years active: 2008–present

Baimurat Allaberiyev (Tajik: Баймурод Аллабердиев, Russian: Баймурат Аллабердиев; born 20 February 1971) also known as Tajik Jimmy (Russian: Таджик Джимми), is a vocalist and musician from Tajikistan of Uzbek ethnic origin. He was discovered while working in a warehouse as a result of a colleague recording him performing a cover of "Jimmy Jimmy Jimmy Aaja" from the Bollywood movie "Disco Dancer" with a cell phone and posting it on the internet. Since that time, he has moved to St. Petersburg and performed there and elsewhere in Russia in theaters and night clubs.

He has appeared in the successful Russian comedy films Yolki, Yolki 3, Yolki 5 and New Husband.
