= The Arena (2001 film) =

2001 film by Timur Bekmambetov

- Cover image of VHS cassette
- Directed by: Timur Bekmambetov
- Written by: John William Corrington
- Produced by: Roger Corman; Sergei Livnev
- Starring: Karen McDougal; Lisa Dergan
- Cinematography: Ulugbek Khamraev
- Edited by: Dmitriy Kiselev
- Music by: Pavel Karmanov; Peter Orloff
- Distributed by: New Horizons Home Video
- Release date: 28 August 2001 (U.S.)
- Running time: 92 min.
- Countries: Russia; United States
- Language: English

The Arena is a direct-to-video film from producer Roger Corman on the subject of female gladiators. It is a remake of the 1974 The Arena with Pam Grier. It was shot in Russia by Kazakh director Timur Bekmambetov with a Russian crew and it featured Playboy Playmates Karen McDougal and Lisa Dergan, in their feature film debut, playing Amazon slaves forced to be gladiators in battles staged in a Roman arena by sadistic Roman Governor Timarchus.

== Cast ==
- Karen McDougal as Jessemina
- Lisa Dergan as Bodicia
- Olga Sutulova as Livia
- Yulia Chicherina as Diedra
- Viktor Verzhbitsky as Timarchus

== See also ==
- List of American films of 2001
