= Pavel. Pervyy i posledniy =

- Genre: Historical drama
- Written by: Arif Aliev; Sergey Kaluzhanov; Elena Lisasina; Elena Milikhovetskaya
- Directed by: Aleksandr Kott
- Starring: Denis Vlasenko; Natalya Surkova; Vladimir Steklov; Aleksey Barabash; Dmitriy Miller; Artem Krylov
- Composer: Anton Silaev
- No. of seasons: 1

Production
- Cinematography: Aleksandr Kuznetsov

Pavel. Pervyy i posledniy (Russian: Павел. Первый и последний) is a 2025 Russian historical drama television series directed by Aleksandr Kott. It stars Denis Vlasenko.

== Plot ==
Paul I's descendants call him a tyrant and even a madman, but his character and history are much deeper. He endured his mother's estrangement and numerous attempts to understand who killed his father and why. When Paul became emperor, he began doing everything possible to break the permissive rule of the nobility and significantly improve the lives of serfs and soldiers.

== Cast ==
- Denis Vlasenko as Pavel
- Natalya Surkova as Ekaterina II
- Vladimir Steklov as Nikita Panin
- Aleksey Barabash as Grigoriy Orlov
- Dmitriy Miller as Grigoriy Potyomkin
- Artem Krylov as Platon Zubov
