= Ivan Urgant =

Russian television host, presenter and actor (born 1978)

- Иван Ургант
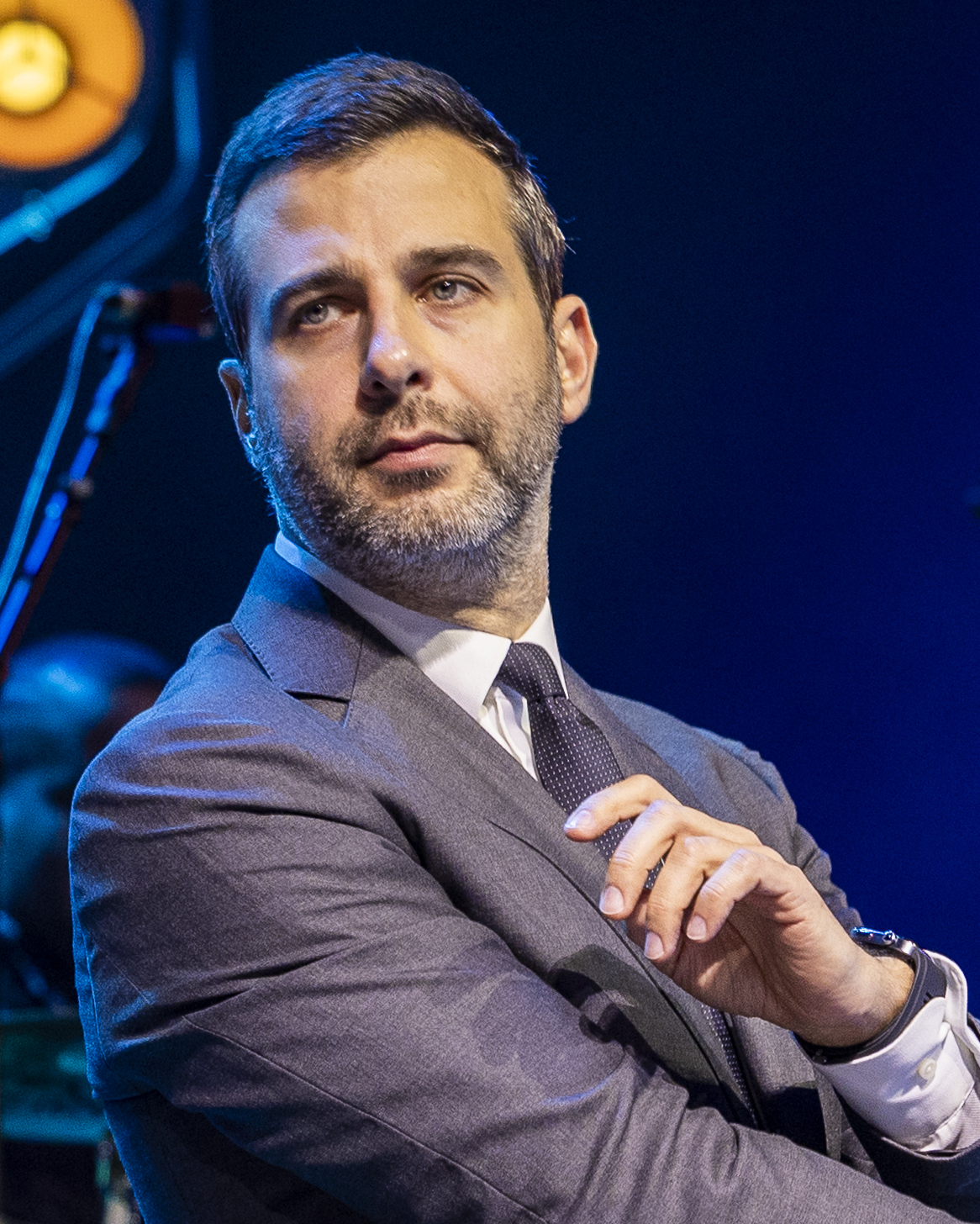
- Urgant in 2025
- Born: 16 April 1978 (age 48); Leningrad, Russian SFSR, Soviet Union
- Other names: Vnuk; Grisha Urgant
- Citizenship: Russia, Israel
- Education: Saint Petersburg State Theatre Arts Academy
- Occupations: Television host, actor
- Years active: 1999–present
- Television: Evening Urgant
- Spouses: Karina Avdeeva (divorced) Natalia Kiknadze (m. 2007)

Ivan Andreyevich Urgant (URR-gant; Russian: Иван Андреевич Ургант; born 16 April 1978) is a Russian show host, presenter and actor. His best known roles in film are Boris in the Yolki series and as Danila in Lucky Trouble. Between 2012 and 2022 he hosted Evening Urgant, a late-night talk show, but was suspended in February 2022 following his public rejection of the war in Ukraine. According to the 2008 and 2011 surveys, Urgant is Russia's most popular TV presenter. He is the chairman of the board of trustees of the Friends Charitable Foundation.

== Biography ==
=== Early life ===
Urgant was born in Leningrad, USSR into a family of actors, the son of Andrei Urgant and Valeriya Kiseleva. His paternal grandparents were actors Nina Urgant and Lev Milinder. His Estonian surname Urgant comes from Nina's father, Nikolai Andreyevich Urgant, an NKVD Major from Luga and a son of Räpina-born Hindrik Urgand. He is of mixed Russian, Estonian, and Jewish heritage. About a year after Ivan's birth the family separated. After his parents broke up, he lived with his mother and stepfather - Leningrad actor Dmitri Ladygin.

Urgant studied at the Leningrad Children's Music School No. 18, at the Gymnasium at the State Russian Museum. He graduated from Saint Petersburg State Theatre Arts Academy. After receiving his acting education, Urgant did not engage in theater as the main profession. He worked as a waiter, bartender, and then as a host in nightly shows in clubs. In 2018, it was reported he had taken Israeli citizenship.

=== Career ===
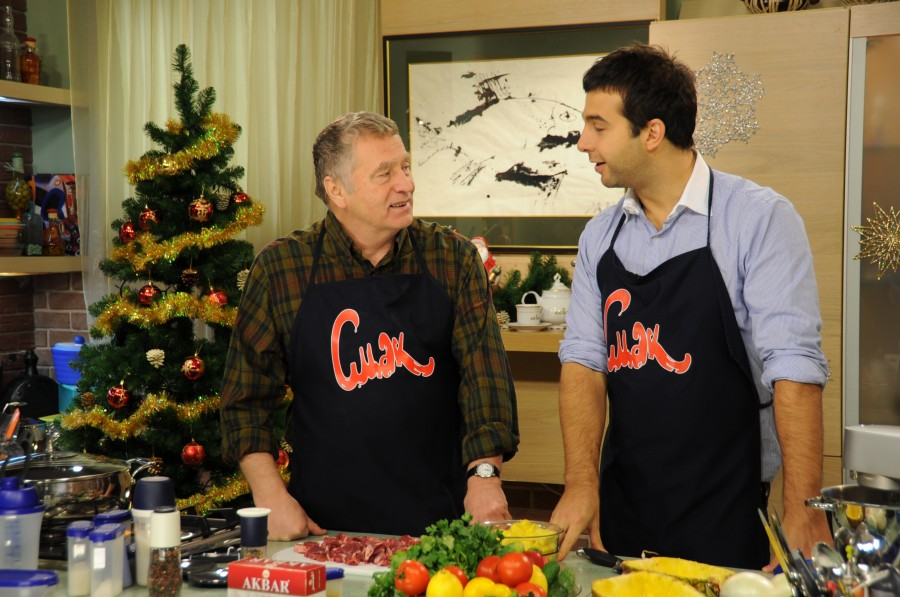
Urgant (right) hosting Vladimir Zhirinovsky at Smak, 2008

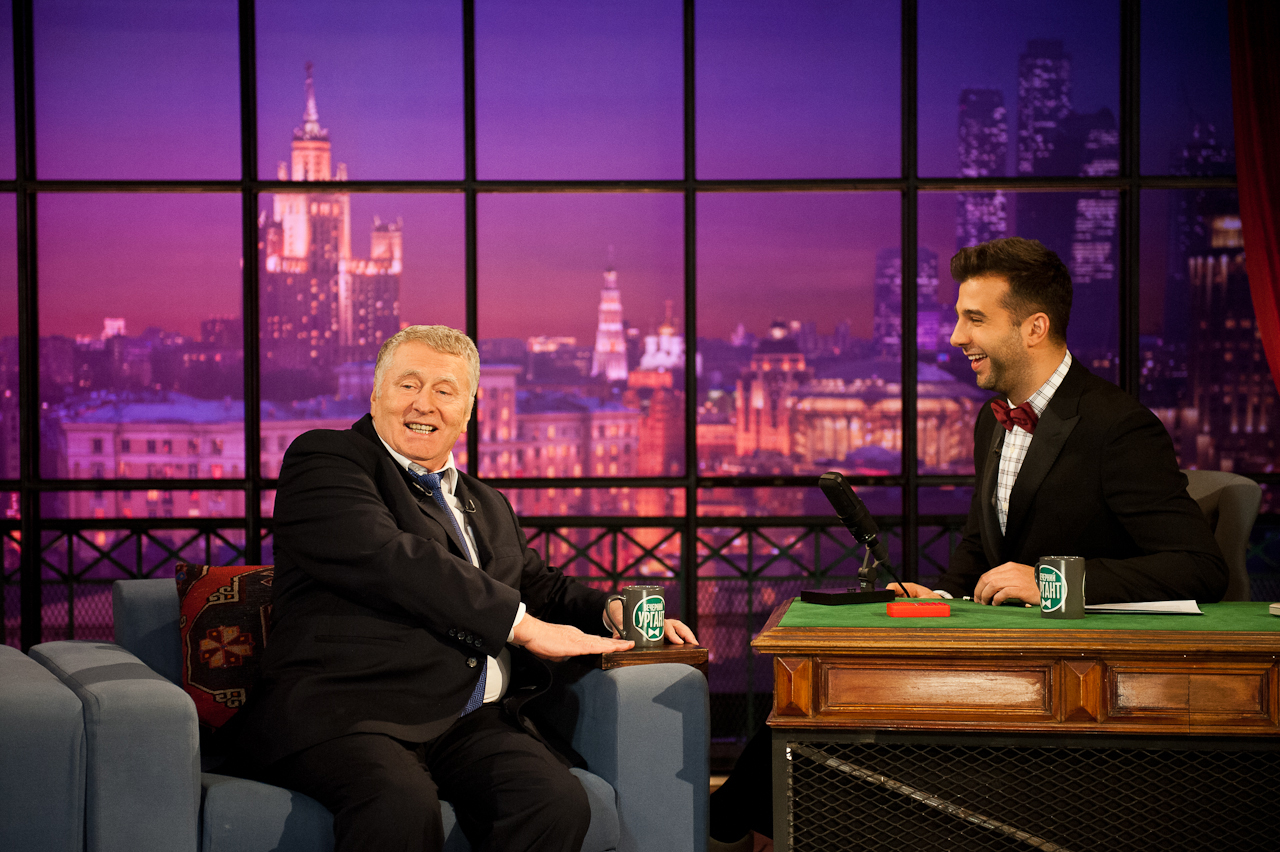
Urgant hosting Vladimir Zhirinovsky Evening Urgant, 2012

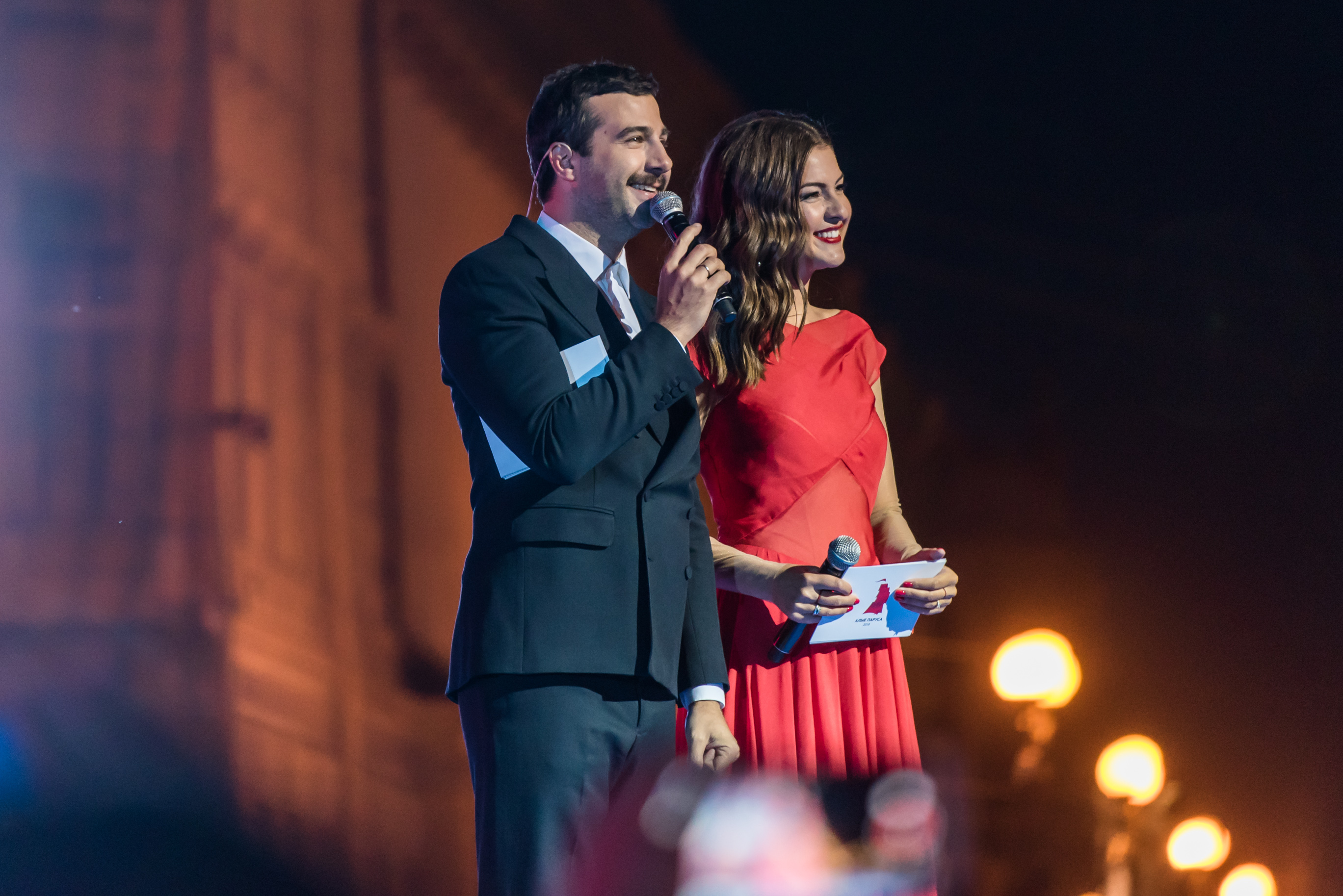
Urgant hosting the Scarlet Sails in Saint Petersburg, 2018

In 1999, Urgant managed to get a job at a St. Petersburg radio station. In addition, he appeared on television, where he was the host of the program Petersburg Courier on 5TV. Later, he was moved to Moscow and continued his career on the radio - first on Russian Radio, and then on "Hit-FM."

In May 2001, Urgant first appeared on Moscow television, on the television channel MTV Russia. He received an invitation to a casting at a time when Olga Shelest and Anton Komolov were looking for a couple of hosts to team up with on the show Cheerful Morning. Since 2002, after the departure of the original team of VJs of "MTV Russia", he began to host the programs Total Show and Expresso.

From 2003 to 2005 he was involved in a number of TV projects on the Russia-1: he was the host of TV show People's Artist and Pyramid. He has been working on Channel One since 2005. Previously, Urgant was a TV presenter in the programs Smak, Evening Urgant and Prozhektorperiskhilton. He also often conducts award ceremonies.

Starting from 2006, Urgant has appeared with Vladimir Pozner in the travel documentary series titled Travels of Pozner and Urgant.

In 2007, 2009, 2010 (2), 2011, 2014, 2015 and 2016, Urgant was awarded TEFI.

On 16 May 2009, he presented the finale of the 2009 Eurovision Song Contest with former Russian Eurovision participant Alsou. In December 2017, Urgant was one of the hosts of the 2018 FIFA World Cup Team Draw Show, with Gary Lineker and Maria Komandnaya.

On 24 February 2022, he posted "No to War" on his Instagram account following the invasion of Ukraine by Russia after which his late-night programme was taken off-air.

In 2024, Urgant played the lead role in the drama film You Cried in Your Sleep, which was produced by Aleksandr Sokurov.

=== Other ventures ===
Since 2011, Urgant has co-owned a restaurant in Moscow, The Sad (Russian: Сад) Garden, with Aleksandr Tsekalo. He has been a board member and co-owner of the real estate agency W1Evans since 2016.

In December 2025, Urgant launched his creative YouTube channel titled "Живой Ургант" ("Urgant Live"). As of 5 October 2026 the channel has more than 403,000 subscribers and more than 27.27 million views over 42 videos. One of the popular series of the chanel is "A Hundred Questions for the Dead", where Urgant interviews an actor pretending to be a historical person, such as Fyodor Dostoevsky, Anton Chekhov, Nikolai Gogol, Mikhail Lermontov and Joseph Brodsky.

== Filmography ==
=== Actor ===
- Streets of Broken Lights, 1999, as Nikolay "Mammoth" Kolesnikov
- Yolki, 2010, as Boris Vorobyov
- Lucky Trouble, 2011, as Danya
- Vysotsky. Thank You For Being Alive, 2011, as Seva Kulagin
- Yolki 2, 2011, as Boris Vorobyov
- Yolki 3, 2013, as Boris Vorobyov
- Yolki 1914, 2014, as Boris Yefimovich
- Yolki 5, 2016, as Boris Vorobyov
- Ice, 2018, cameo
- Yolki 6, 2017, as Boris Vorobyov
- Yolki 7, 2018, as Boris Vorobyov
- Yolki 8, 2018, as Boris Vorobyov
- You Cried in Your Sleep, 2024, as father

=== Host ===
Urgant has hosted various TV shows, including:

- Petersburg Courier (5TV, 1999)
- Big Movie (MTV Russia, 2001)
- Cheerful Morning together with Olga Shelest (MTV Russia, 2001–2002)
- Total Show (MTV Russia, 2002)
- Expresso together with Tatyana Gevorkyan (MTV Russia, 2002–2004)
- People's Artist together with Fyokla Tolstaya (Russia-1, 2003–2004)
- Pyramid (Russia-1, 2004)
- Great Premiere (Channel One, 2005)
- Spring with Ivan Urgant (Channel One, 2006)
- Gusto (Channel One; 2006–2018)
- Circus With Stars together with Alexandra Volkovskaya (Channel One, 2007–2008)
- Stenka na stenku together with Aleksandr Tsekalo (Showdown) (Channel One, 2007–2008)
- The Magic World of Walt Disney (Channel One, 2007–2011)
- Big Difference together with Aleksandr Tsekalo (Channel One, 2008–2012)
- One-Storied America together with Vladimir Pozner (Channel One, 2008)
- Prozhektorperiskhilton together with Aleksandr Tsekalo, Garik Martirosyan and Sergei Svetlakov (Channel One, 2008–2012, 2017)
- Tour de France together with Vladimir Pozner (Channel One, 2011)
- Evening Urgant (Channel One; 2012–2022)
- Their Italia together with Vladimir Pozner (Channel One; 2012)
- The German Puzzle together with Vladimir Pozner (Channel One; 2013)
- England in general and particular together with Vladimir Pozner (Channel One; 2014)
- Jewish Happiness together with Vladimir Pozner (Channel One; 2016)
- Podmoskovnie vechera (Channel One; 2016–2017). Producer.
- In search of Don Quixote together with Vladimir Pozner (Channel One; 2017)
- The Most. The Most. The Most together with Vladimir Pozner (Channel One; 2019)
- Japan. The reverse side of the kimono together with Vladimir Pozner (Channel One; 2021)

== Music ==
Ivan Urgant plays guitar, piano and drums. In the late 1990s he acted under the pseudonym Vnuk (Russian: Внук - Grandson). In 2011 Ivan renewed his own singing career and now is acting under the pseudonym Grisha Urgant.

== Discography ==
- 1999 — "Star"
- 2012 — "Estrada"

== Theatrical experience ==
Savva Vasilkov in the play of the Moscow Pushkin Drama Theatre "Mad Money".

Preceded by (Serbia) Jovana Janković and Željko Joksimović	Eurovision Song Contest presenter 2009; With: Alsou (Final)	Succeeded by (Norway) Nadia Hasnaoui, Haddy Jatou N'jie and Erik Solbakken
