= Yolki 3 =

- Directed by: Olga Kharina; Dmitriy Kiselev; Levan Gabriadze; Ekaterina Telegina; Alexander Kott; Alexander Karpilovsky; Anton Megerdichev; Zaour Zaseev
- Written by: Olga Kharina; Anna Matison
- Produced by: Timur Bekmambetov; Iva Stromilova; Olga Kharina
- Starring: Ivan Urgant; Sergey Svetlakov; Pyotr Fyodorov
- Narrated by: Konstantin Khabensky
- Cinematography: Pyotr Dukhovskoy; Mikhail Milashin; Sergei Trofimov; Andrey Vakorin; Ivan Lebedev; Anton Belov; Nikolay Bogachev; Levan Kapanadze
- Edited by: Maria Likhachova
- Music by: Nikolai Fomenko; Maxim Leonidov; Pavel Yesenin
- Production company: Bazelevs
- Release date: 26 December 2013
- Running time: 100 minutes
- Country: Russia
- Language: Russian
- Budget: $5 million
- Box office: $40 million

Yolki 3 (Russian: Ёлки 3, meaning Christmas Trees 3), Russian New Year comedy film. It is a continuation of the films Yolki (2010) and Yolki 2 (2011). The premiere took place on 26 December 2013.The release on DVD and Blu-ray took place on 27 January 2014. As of 2022, Yolki 3 is the highest grossing film of the entire Yolki film series. In 2014, a prequel to this film called Yolki 1914 was released. Yolki 3 was a box office success, collecting more than 38 million dollars. The film received mostly positive reviews from critics and viewers, earning praise for its atmosphere, direction, and story, though the script and lack of character development were criticized.

== Plot ==
There is an addition to the Kravchuk family – Nastya receives two pups; thoroughbred female Yoko and mixed-breed male dog Pirate. Nastya's mother plans to take Yoko to London for a highly profitable dog breeding business right during the New Year. Nastya becomes indignant and informs everyone of this on social media. The news becomes viral. Pirate does not want to be separated from Yoko, but at the last moment he lets her go, thereby launching the "Boomerang of Good".

Nastya's mother, Elena, having the gift of "good", shares it with her client, Evgeniy, by helping build a children's petting zoo. Evgeniy, having received the "good", leaves home to help his friend Boris, who is in danger of losing an important contract and who, at the most crucial moment displaces his phone. Children of the two friends are left home alone (their wives are at the sauna). Boris buys a phone to contact the Chinese with whom he makes important deals. By mistake, they get on a bus going to a psychiatric hospital. Boris shares his phone with Fedor, one of the passengers. Fedor calls his twin brother, Tolik, with whom he has not talked for a long time and wishes to see again. Tolik, in turn, is on the plane along with Nastya's parents and Yoko.

Pirate can not stand the separation and runs away from home in search of Yoko. He runs to the airport and finds the plane where Yoko is inside. Tolik unsuccessfully tries to stop the plane which is to fly to London. Pirate manages to continue his journey by air with bribing a dog with sausage who is flying with his owners to London on the next flight.

From Yekaterinburg, Tolik reports the location of his brother to Natasha. Natasha shares the "good" with her friend Galya and persuades her to make peace with her husband, Alexander Korovin, and forgive his infidelity. Galya bestows the "good" to Korovin and her father, Konstantin Lvovich. Korovin is a friend of Professor Andrei Nikolayevich, who quarreled with his wife, Natasha, because he too was caught cheating. Konstantin Lvovich is a military commissar, who a year ago sent snowboarder Dima and skier Grisha to the island of Ratmanov. Konstantin Lvovich allows the old woman Manya and Olesya to fly to the island. Soon, Dima himself learns about this. Dima receives the "Boomerang of Good".

Meanwhile, Vika, creator of the social group "Boomerang of Good," is going to London to see her boyfriend, Sasha. But she is made to stay and visit her neighbor, Nikolai Petrovich, who in turn forces Vika to fly to London, because her lover is waiting for her. Vika's laptop remains in the apartment of Nikolai Petrovich, and he adds his poems in the form of status updates on the page. On the way to the airport, Vika tries to help passers-by hoping for the "Boomerang of Good", but she ends up being put behind bars on suspicion of theft, and her phone is taken away.

A different incident occurs with Senior Sergeant Alexei Kolesnikov, whose work is keeping an eye on the prisoners. His friend Denis, a traumatologist, learns that his school sweetheart, Masha, had come to Novosibirsk. To impress her, Denis asks Alexei, employee of a car dealership and father of Misha Kolesnikov, to take the most expensive Mercedes for a test drive. Alexei agrees, provided that he will follow behind and observe what is happening. When Denis and Masha drive in the car, an accident occurs, as a result of which Alexei goes to the hospital, and Denis's car is stolen. When Denis returns to the auto dealership, he sees that the robbers have returned the car, and Masha finds out about the deception.

Misha learns about the accident and returns Vika's phone back to her without realizing it. Vika calls Sasha and tries to explain what happened, but Sasha does not believe her. Nikolai Petrovich permanently deletes his popular group "Boomerang of Good" from the social network, as Vika no longer believes in its existence anymore. But at this moment Sasha notices Pirate on the streets of London and understands that Vika was right. He reports this on the social network and this becomes the most discussed news.

Nastya still has one more option: to call her uncle, snowboarder Dima. Dima calls his brother, Kolya, Nastya's father, and informs that Nastya can not stand the separation from her pets due to the fault of her parents. Kolya refuses to take part in Elena's plans and goes to the airport. There he sees on live TV that all flights have been canceled as a dog was found on the runway. It turns out to be Pirate. Kolya runs to the takeoff strip where Pirate is about to get shot by the guards. Elena watches the events live. Kolya reaches Pirate at the moment of the shot, and the bullet hits Kolya. Elena grabs Yoko and runs to the airport. There she finds her husband. Yoko "kisses" Kolya, and he comes to consciousness. Pirate and Yoko find each other. "The Boomerang of Good" returns to Pirate.

Boris and Evgeniy escape from the hospital and manage to return home to the arrival of wives. Andrei and Natasha reconcile with each other. Olesya meets her boyfriend Dima, and Manya goes skiing. A son is born to Misha and he congratulates his dad on becoming a grandfather. Masha finds Denis and remembers how much they were in love. Sasha returns to Moscow and finds Vika. Together they call Nikolai Petrovich and thank him for his help. Kolya and Lena call Nastya and report that they will soon return with Pirate and Yoko. Nastya gets new dogs too soon.

== Cast ==
- Ivan Urgant — Boris Nikolaevich Vorobiev, Evgeniy's best friend, successful businessman
- Sergey Svetlakov — Evgeniy Pavlovich, Boris's best friend
- Pyotr Fyodorov — Nikolai Kravchuk, Nastya's father
- Anna Chipovskaya — Elena Kravchuk, mother of Nastia
- Valeria Strelyaeva – Anastasia Nikolaevna Kravchuk
- Vera Strokova – Vika, creator of the group "Boomerang of Good"
- Valentin Gaft — Nikolai Petrovich, lonely pensioner
- Anton Bogdanov – Denis Yurievich, trauma physician
- Mariya Lugovaya — Masha, girlfriend of Denis
- Alexander Golovin – Dimon Fomenko, snowboarder, Nastya's uncle
- Alexander Domogarov Jr. — Grigory Zemlyanikin, skier
- Galina Stakhanova – old woman Manya
- Anna Khilkevich – Olesya, granddaughter of Manya, girlfriend of Dimon
- Gosha Kutsenko — Professor
- Maria Shukshina — Natasha, wife of Andrei Nikolaevich
- Aleksandr Robak — Alexander Korovin, friend of Andrei Nikolaevich
- Ksenia Gromova – Galina, Korovin's wife, daughter of Konstantin Lvovich
- Tatyana Dogileva — Marta Petrovna, head physician of a psychiatric hospital
- Elena Plaksina – Olya, wife of Boris
- Irina Arkhipova – Olya, wife of Evgeniy
- Ivan Ivashkin – Sasha, Vika's boyfriend
- Maxim Kostromykin – Misha Kolesnikov, senior police sergeant, friend of Denis
- Igor Savochkin — Alexey Kolesnikov, employee of the car dealership, Misha's father
- Alexander Petrov — Slavik, friend of Denis
- Alexander Ilyin – Konstantin Lvovich, military commissar
- Olga Chipovskaya – Nastya's grandmother
- Tamara Spiricheva – Angela Pavlovna, neighbor of Nikolai Petrovich
- Maria Dobrzhinskaya – Svetlana
- Alexander Shatokhin – Igor
- Baimurat Allaberiyev — Yusuf
- Adylbek Atykhaev – Ibrahim
- Tatiana Gorodets – mother of Misha
- Leila Abu-al-Kishek – Aigul, wife of Misha
- Yuri Ustyugov – troubled passenger on the bus and his brother on the plane
- Oleg Akulich – bus driver
- Marina Shultz – Lyudmila, woman at the ATM
- Maxim Litovchenko – husband of Lyudmila
- Oleg Mayboroda – manager in the showroom
- Igor Lyakh – Santa Claus in the bullpen
- Andrius Paulavicius – Morrison, owner of the dog in London
- Demid Panaetov – Boris, son of Boris
- Ivan Korolyuk – Boris, son of Evgeniy

== Production ==
Shooting took place in 12 cities: Moscow, Samara, Voronezh, Novosibirsk, St. Petersburg, Krasnodar, Ufa, Magnitogorsk, Perm, Yekaterinburg, Irkutsk and Almaty. In each city 700 extras built one letter of the congratulatory sentence "Happy New Year!"

Winter scenes were shot in the summer. To do this, the prop department needed 10 000 square meters of coverage for imitation of snow. For the shooting in Yekaterinburg, 450 kilograms of ground white paper was poured onto the heads and under the feet of the actors.

Valentin Gaft read his own poetry in the film.

== Spin-off ==
A spin-off titled Paws, Bones & Rock'n'roll featuring the characters of dogs Yoko and Pirate was released in 2015.
