= Yolki 1914 =

- Directed by: Timur Bekmambetov; Dmitriy Kiselev; Alexander Kott; Yuri Bykov; Aleksander Karpilovsky; Ekaterina Telegina; Andrey Kavun; Zaour Zaseev
- Written by: Olga Kharina; Ilya Zofin; Anna Matison; Alesya Kazantseva; Oleg Malovichko; Sugar 1kg (Igor Meerson, Konstantin Bushmanov, Sergey Arefiev, Sergey Sysoev); Timur Ezugbai
- Produced by: Timur Bekmambetov; Sergei Ageev; Olga Kharina
- Starring: Ivan Urgant; Sergey Svetlakov; Artur Smolyaninov
- Narrated by: Konstantin Khabensky
- Cinematography: Sergei Trofimov; Pyotr Dukhovskoy; Yuri Korobeinikov; Mikhail Milashin; Evgeniy Ermolenko; Anton Belov
- Edited by: Maria Likhachova
- Music by: Yuri Poteenko
- Production company: Bazelevs
- Release date: December 25, 2014
- Running time: 106 minutes
- Country: Russia
- Language: Russian
- Budget: $9 million
- Box office: $12 914 962

Yolki 4 1914 (Russian: Ёлки 1914, meaning Christmas Trees 1914 or Christmas Trees 4), is a 2014 Russian comedy film. It is a prequel to the 2013 film Yolki 3. It premiered on December 14, 2014; the film was released on December 25. At the same time as the fourth film in the series, a spin-off, titled Paws, Bones & Rock'n'roll, was released. Starring Ivan Urgant, Sergey Svetlakov, Maria Poroshina, Viktor Verzhbitsky, Arthur Smolyaninov, Alexander Golovin, Alexander Domogarov Jr. The film tells the story of events in the Russian Empire during the First World War in 1914.

Yolki 1914 received mostly mixed and negative reviews from critics and audiences, who criticized the boring plot but praised the actors, costumes, and atmosphere of the Russian Empire. Despite the reviews, the film was a box office success, grossing over 12 million dollars, on a budget of 9 million. The sequel, Yolki 5, was released two years later in 2016.

The film's slogan is "There hasn't been a Christmas tree like this for 100 years".

== Plot ==
The film takes place in the Russian Empire in 1914 against the backdrop of the First World War which is just beginning. Six segments tell about life in large and small Russian cities, in noblemen's estates and in poor urban families.

=== Segment "House" ===
Dandy Boris Efimovich (Ivan Urgant) buys a manor on the Black Sea coast to impress his rich bride Bella (Evgeniya Khirivskaya), but former owner of the house Evgeny Pavlovich (Sergey Svetlakov) does not have the heart to tell the numerous households who live there that they do not have a home anymore. And to make matters worse, the next day is Christmas.

=== Segment "The Royal Christmas Tree" ===
Ivan (Aleksandr Pal), a soldier lying in a hospital set up in the Konstantinovsky Palace, collects signatures from all over Russia to return the holiday of the tree. Officer of the tsarist army (Konstantin Khabensky) helps him in this matter.

=== Segment "Figure skaters" ===
Officer of the tsarist police Pyotr Kuznetsov (Artur Smolyaninov) and his girlfriend Xenia (Katerina Shpitsa) are to perform at the international figure skating championship in Russia, but Pyotr is torn between love for the sport, the girl and his service.

=== Segment "The Bear" ===
Village lad Senka (Anton Bogdanov) is friends with a tame bear, but the extravagant and ever-hungover gentleman (Yan Tsapnik) is trying to separate them in order to curry favor with the count (Viktor Verzhbitsky) who has long wanted to hunt a bear.

=== Segment "Volunteers" ===
Friends from Yekaterinburg (Alexander Golovin and Alexander Domogarov, Jr.), enlist as volunteers for the war, and before leaving they want to visit their acquaintance Katya (Anna Khilkevich), who has not decided which of them she choose as her boyfriend. But Katya is in Perm. She calls the guys to visit, but also requests them to pick up her grandmother Marya Ilinichna (Galina Stakhanova).

=== Segment "Chaliapin" ===
Glasha and her little brother Grisha need a Christmas miracle - their mother is very sick, and there is no money or food left for the family. They are saved by a chance meeting with Feodor Chaliapin.

== Cast ==
- Ivan Urgant as Boris Efimovich
- Sergey Svetlakov as Evgeniy Pavlovich
- Evgeniya Khirivskaya as Bella
- Aleksandr Pal as Filippov
- Vera Panfilova as Tatiana
- Artur Smolyaninov as Pyotr Kuznetsov
- Katerina Shpitsa as Xenia
- Vladimir Gostyukhin as Alexey Vladimirovich, chief of Pyotr
- Anton Bogdanov as Senka
- Yan Tsapnik as master Alexander Arkadevich
- Viktor Verzhbitsky as Count Vostrikov
- Alexander Golovin as Mitya
- Alexander Domogarov, Jr. as Fedor
- Galina Stakhanova as Maria Ilyinichna (Baba Manya)
- Anna Khilkevich as Katya
- Daniil Izotov as Grisha
- Sophia Hilkova as Glasha
- Ildar Abdrazakov as Feodor Chaliapin
- Maria Poroshina as mother of Grisha and Glasha
- Konstantin Khabensky as officer, father of Grisha and Glasha
- Dato Bakhtadze as General Tarkhan-Mouravi
- Yevgeny Pronin as brother of Ivan
- Irina Arkhipova as Antonina
- Elena Plaksina as Olya
- Nina Dvorzetskaya as Elena Pavlovna
- Albert Filozov as Vasily Grigoryevich
- Alexandra Nazarova as Maria Afanasyevna
- Emmanuil Vitorgan as Alexey Trofimovich
- Tatyana Piskaryova as Nastasya Frolovna
- Alexander Nevsky as Lev Afanasievich
- Alexander Polovtsev as commandant
- Aleksandr Bashirov as sailor Zheleznyak
- Sergey Batalov as Vladimir wounded soldier
- Alexander Komissarov as Serafim
- Andrey Gusev as pharmacist
- Vladimir Demidov as master atelier
- Alexander Chernyavsky as doctor

== Production ==
Shooting began in February 2014 with the segment "Figure skaters". The final scene of the film was filmed in several cities: St. Petersburg, Perm, Yekaterinburg, Voronezh, Irkutsk, Omsk, Krasnoyarsk, Saratov and Astana. As reported by the distributors, for each of the cities where the shooting took place, there was to be a film with its own version of the finale.

On the set of the film, Russia's record for the most popular selfie was set; 349 Perms, 441 Saratovites, 423 Kazanians, 369 Irkutsk, 312 Omsk citizens, 318 Voronezh residents and 420 Krasnoyarsk residents took part.

To play the figure skater, Artur Smolyaninov had to undergo training, as before that he skated only in his childhood when playing hockey. Professional ice dancer Ilia Averbukh taught Artur figure skating.

The bear which appeared in the film is Stepan, which appeared in several films (The Edge, The Barber of Siberia and The Horde).

Konstantin Khabensky, who did the voiceovers for all the Yolki films, appears for the first time on screen in Yolki 1914.
