= Paws, Bones & Rock'n'roll =

- Film poster
- Directed by: Maksim Sveshnikov
- Written by: Vadim Sveshnikov; Maksim Sveshnikov
- Produced by: Timur Bekmambetov; Evgeniya Aronova
- Starring: Andrey Merzlikin; Yan Tsapnik; Lera Strelayeva; Galina Konshina
- Cinematography: Andrei Vakorin
- Music by: Mark Williott
- Production company: Bazelevs
- Release date: January 29, 2015
- Running time: 90 minutes
- Country: Russia
- Language: Russian
- Budget: $2 million
- Box office: $2 019 088

Paws, Bones & Rock'n'roll (Russian: Ёлки лохматые, romanized: Yolki lokhmatye, meaning Shaggy Christmas Trees), is a 2015 Russian children's comedy film, spin-off from Yolki, featuring the dogs Pirate and Yoko, which appeared in Yolki 3.

== Plot ==
Samara resident Nastya, mistress of the dogs Pirate and Yoko, flies with her grandmother to St. Petersburg, and leaves her pets in the hotel for dogs, where two thieves, Makar (a hotel employee) and Lyokha (a dog dealer in a market that is not in the best of terms with the authorities) - decide to break in to the houses of the wealthy dog owners, including Nastya's parents. Pirate and Yoko resist going to the hotel, but no matter how hard they try, they are still left there. Dissatisfied with this, the dogs run away. Walking around the city, they return home, where they can do their favorite things - eat as much they want, play tirelessly and sleep on the master's bed. But the thieves have already arrived at the house.

Seeing uninvited guests, Pirate and Yoko turn on the TV so that thieves think that someone is in the house. Even in the afternoon, Nastya and her grandmother are detained at the airport. The police release them for the next flight. Nastya tries to contact the hotel staff, and they try to calm her down. Arriving in St. Petersburg, Nastya escapes. Nastya's frightened grandmother announces to the police about the disappearance of the child. In Samara, dogs and thieves fight each other. Nastya finds the dogs and thieves. The thieves leave the dogs and kidnap Nastya. They try to hide in the van, but Pirate attacks them and the wagon capsizes near the patrol car. As a result, the police detain the thieves, and Nastya with her family and dogs celebrate the New Year. The further fate of the thieves is revealed in the movie Yolki 5. Boris Vorobyov buys a penguin from Makar, who is on the phone with Lyokha. From the conversation it turns out that after they were detained, they were both facing prison sentences, but Lyokha then took all the blame on himself. Makar is released and gets a job as a salesperson.

== Cast ==
- Aisa Animal Art — Pirate
- Femmy — Yoko
- Andrey Merzlikin — Lyokha, thief
- Yan Tsapnik — Makar, thief
- Valeriya Strelayeva — Nastya
- Galina Konshina — Nastya's grandmother
- Viktor Vasiliev — manager of the hotel for dogs
- Andrei Fedortsov — bus driver
- Pyotr Fyodorov— Kolya, Nastya's father
- Anna Chipovskaya — Lena, Nastya's mother
- Igor Vlasov — Cheburek
- Sergei Troev — Banan
