= Surviving New Year's =

Surviving New Year's is a 2008 American comedy-drama film written, directed and produced by David Beatty.

== Plot ==
Jerry and Marty have just bought a brand new house, and what better way to celebrate than by throwing a New Year's party. However, as the evening progresses, some threatening secrets surface that might jeopardize the course of their marriage and the lives of their closest friends. This universally significant evening unexpectedly alters the lives of twelve intertwining friends and evokes a provocative inspection into marriage, friendship and the bewildering possibilities of love. See how a seemingly conventional celebration can easily spiral out of control, making Surviving New Years a resolution in and of itself.

== Cast ==
Gerry Katzman as Jerry

Dyan McBride as Marty

Katie Rubin as Sophie

Aaron Ramzi (credited as Ammar Ramzi) as Tony

Heather Williams as Veronica

Dennis O'Brien as Max

Nino Mancuso as Vincent

Emily Brideau as Denise

Albert Friedman Fox as Bernie

Glen Hardy as David

Sally Norton as Judith

Michael Perl as Reverend Mike

== Production Notes ==
The story was written out in great detail, however the lines of each scene were completely improvised by the actors.

There was a period of only 5 in which the entire cast would be available to film. In addition to keeping a small budget, the decision to film using digital video was made. Beatty felt this also added a sense of intimacy that would draw the audience into the action as if they were party guests watching and observing from the sidelines.

== Soundtrack ==
Original music created by Daniel Westiner

== Release ==
The film premiered at the 2008 SoCal Independent Film Festival in Huntington Beach, CA.

== Awards and nominations ==
Surviving New Year's was an "official selection" and won Best Ensemble Cast at the 2008 SoCal Film Festival in Huntington Beach California.
