= Dmitry Kiselyov (film director) =

Russian film director (born 1978)

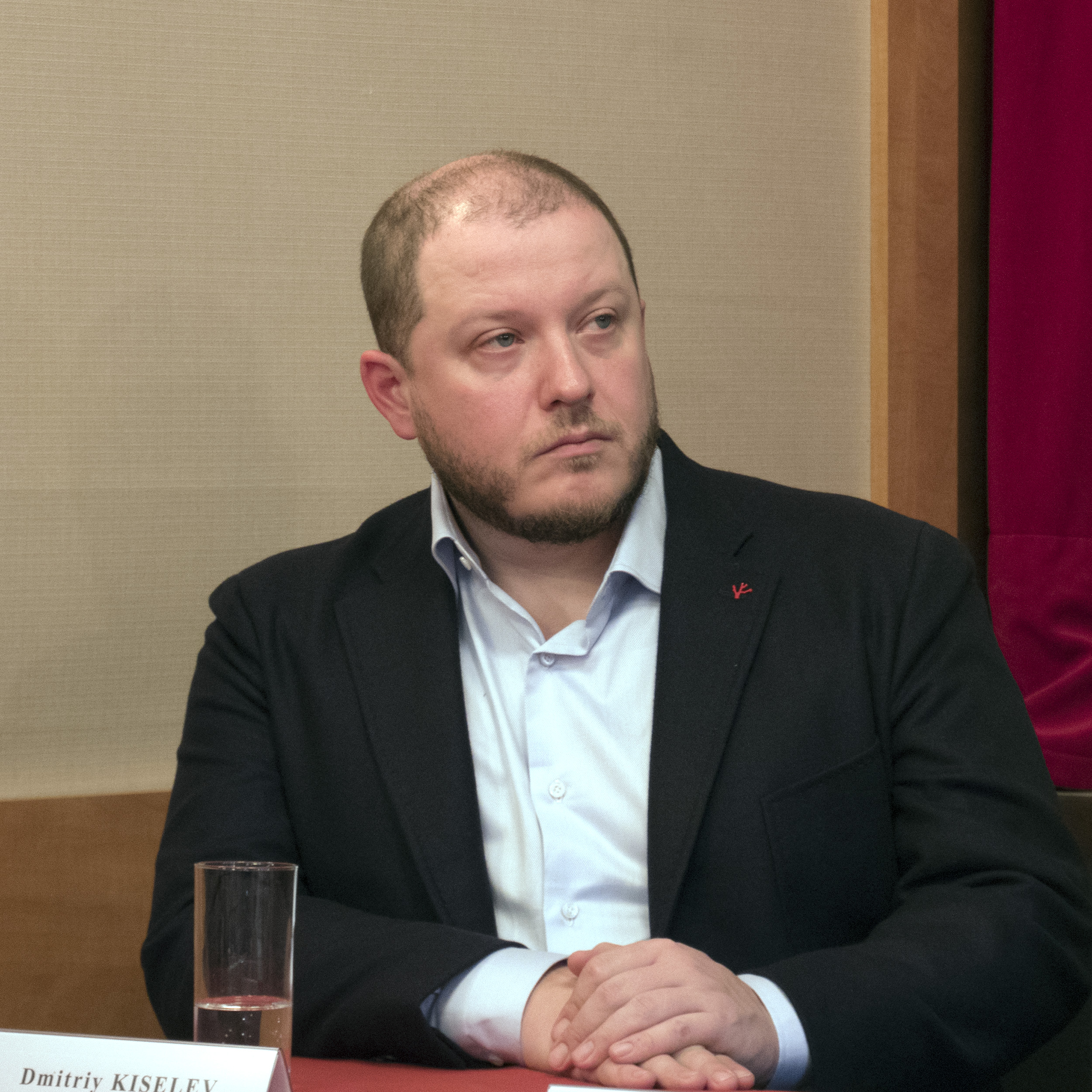
- Kiselyov in 2017
- Born: Dmitry Igorevich Kiselyov; June 5, 1978 (age 48); Moskva, Soviet Union (now Moscow, Russia)
- Education: Moscow Technical University of Communications and Informatics
- Occupation: film director

Dmitry Igorevich Kiselyov (Russian: Дмитрий Игоревич Киселёв, born June 5, 1978) is a Russian film director. He graduated from Moscow Technical University of Communications and Informatics. He has been working in Timur Bekmambetov’s team since 1997.

He directed commercials for the brands 'Renaissance Insurance', 'Formula Kino', 'Pepsi', 'Baltimore', 'Heineken', 'Strelets', 'Raiffeisenbank', 'Beeline' and many others.

He also directed music videos for Chicherina ("Going Away, Going Away"), " U-Piter" (Vyacheslav Butusov) ("Girl in the City"), Delta ("Dangerous but Free").

He directed promo videos for the films "Day Watch" and "Wanted".

== Filmography ==
=== Film ===
- Black Lightning (2009)
- Yolki (2010)
- Yolki 2 (2011)
- Gentlemens of Fortune! (2012)
- Yolki 3 (2013)
- Yolki 1914 (2014)
- The Age of Pioneers (2017)
- Yolki 6 (2017)
- Mira (2023)

=== TV series ===
- Londongrad (2015)
- Bones (2016)

== Awards ==
- 2006 - MTV Movie Awards in the category 'Most Spectacular Scene - City Destruction' (Day Watch).
- 2007 - Golden Eagle Award for Best Film Editing for Day Watch.
- 2007 - Golden Eagle Award for Best Editing for his work in the film Day Watch.
- 2017 - Golden Knight Festival Prize: Bronze Knight for the film The Age of Pioneers.
- 2017 - Grand Prix of the festival "Viva Cinema of Russia!" for the film The Age of Pioneers.
