= Yolki 2 =

- Directed by: Dmitriy Kiselev; Alexander Baranov; Alexander Kott; Levan Gabriadze
- Written by: Timur Bekmambetov; Olga Kharina; Anna Matison; Roman Nepomnyaschiy
- Produced by: Timur Bekmambetov; Iva Stromilova
- Starring: Ivan Urgant; Sergey Svetlakov; Aleksei Petrenko
- Narrated by: Konstantin Khabensky
- Cinematography: Levan Kapanadze; Maksim Shinkorenko; Sergei Trofimov
- Edited by: Andrey Mesnyankin
- Music by: Pavel Yesenin
- Production company: Bazelevs
- Release date: December 15, 2011
- Running time: 106 minutes
- Country: Russia
- Language: Russian
- Box office: $28.7 million

Yolki 2 (Russian: Ёлки 2, meaning Christmas Trees 2), is 2011 Russian New Year comedy film directed by Dmitry Kiselyov and written by Timur Bekmambetov. The main roles are played by Ivan Urgant, Sergey Svetlakov, Alexey Petrenko and Timur Ortsuev. The film is a continuation of the New Year's film Yolki (2010) directed by Timur Bekmambetov. The phrase "Someone loses, someone finds. Someone leaves, and someone comes", which the deputy says, was borrowed from the film "Day Watch", where it is also said by the character of Viktor Verzhbitsky – Zabulon.

The Russian premiere took place on December 15, 2011, and the release date on DVD is January 24, 2012. With a budget of 5.8 million dollar, the picture collected almost 26 million at the worldwide box office. The film garnered mostly positive reviews from critics and audiences.

A sequel, called Yolki 3, was released in 2013.

== Plot ==
The film's plot revolves around 12 cities in Russia. Many of the characters appeared in the previous film.

=== Segment "Aerodrome" ===
Two pilots (Alexei Petrenko as the chief pilot, Pawel Bershak as the co-pilot) try to land a passenger plane landing in the heart of an abandoned airport, without knowing if anyone is in the control tower. To the delight of the pilots and the passengers, a lonely man, former pilot (Vladimir Menshov), continues to work at the abandoned airport out of a sense of duty.

=== Segment "Amnesia, or what is ZG?" ===
The storyline which transpires throughout the entire film is about the successful Saint Petersburg businessman, Boris (Ivan Urgant), who gets amnesia. Boris desperately tries to remember who he is. He meets Evgeniy (Sergei Svetlakov), a veterinarian from Yakutsk, whom he got to know a year earlier and now happens to meet again, and together with him he sets out on a journey to regain his memory, with only clues being the letters Z.G written on the back of his hand.

=== Segment "Bathtub" ===
A couple of friends (Alexander Domogarov Jr. and Alexander Golovin), extreme sport enthusiasts, still continue to compete with each other. They happen to meet old woman Manya, whom they accidentally injured in the previous film, and end up trying to do a favor – they need to deliver a cast iron bathtub to Manya, which was gifted to her by a local parliament member (Viktor Verzhbitsky). It also turns out that Manya has an attractive granddaughter (Anna Khilkevich).

=== Segment "Santa Claus" ===
Little girl Nastya (Valeria Streliaje) lives with her mother (Anna Chipovskaya) who raised her as a single parent. Nevertheless, Nastya feels that the only person who may grant her and her mother happiness is the father whom she has never met. Her mother's friend also thinks the same, and helps her write a letter to Santa Claus. But it turns out that the wish might come true when Santa (Pyotr Fyodorov) suddenly appears at the front door of their home ...

=== Segment "Chimes and the Airplane" ===
On the eve of the New Year, Yulia Snegiryova receives a letter which should have been delivered forty years ago. In it her beloved Grigory Zemlyanikin apologizes to her for committing a stupid mistake, indicating that he will wait for her every year under the chimes on the Red Square. As soon as she arrives, he flies away on a voyage. And he urgently needs to return at twelve o'clock to his beloved.

Taxi driver Pashka (Nikita Presnyakov) serves in the Presidential Regiment. On December 31, he waits for pop-star Vera Brezhneva (as herself) on the Red Square under the chiming clock. He wrote many letters to Vera but has not received any response. Pashka decides to go to her. On his way he meets Vera's agent. It turns out that this is the same producer Fedya from the first film, and that he hid all of Pashka's letters from her. Fedor learns that "a taxi driver from Krasnoyarsk" has come and calls for protection. But Pashka "cuts" him and goes to Vera. The singer is irritated with Pashka for not writing to her and claims that she does not know him. But when Vera takes her producer's phone, she finally reads all his messages, and they meet under the chiming clock on Red Square.

=== Segment "Romeo and Alyona" ===
Alyona (Alyona Konstantinova) is a Russian girl who wants to marry a Caucasian young man named Aslan Movsarov (Timor Orzoyev) even though her parents are against this. The girl's father, police captain Vladimir Snegiryov (Sergey Bezrukov) decides to lock her in protective custody and tries to force her to break up with Aslan.

== Cast ==
- Ivan Urgant — Boris Nikolaevich Vorobyov, Evgeniy's best friend, Zemlyanikina's nephew.
- Sergey Svetlakov — Evgeniy Pavlovich, Boris' best friend
- Elena Plaksina – Olya Kravchuk, Boris' bride
- Aleksei Petrenko — Grigory Pavlovich Zemlyanikin, pilot, lover of Yulia Snegiryova
- Irina Alferova – Yulia Snegiryov, beloved of Zemlyanikin and Vorobyev
- Viktor Verzhbitsky — Igor Borisovich Vorobyov brother Zemlyanikina, deputy
- Vladimir Menshov — Valery Mikhailovich Gavrilov, petty aviation officer
- Galina Konshina – Olya's mother
- Nikita Presnyakov – Pasha Bondarev Private Private Presidential Regiment
- Pyotr Fyodorov — Nikolai Kravchuk, Nastya's father and Olya's brother
- Anna Chipovskaya — Elena Kravchuk, Nastya's mother
- Valeria Strelyaeva – Anastasia Kravchuk daughter of Nikolai and Lena
- Alexander Golovin – Dimon Fomenko, snowboarder, Nastya's uncle
- Alexander Domogarov Jr. — Grisha Zemlyanikin, skier
- Galina Stakhanova – Manya, Olesya's grandmother
- Anna Khilkevich – Olesya granddaughter of the woman Mani, the beloved Dimona
- Alyona Konstantinova – Alyona Snegiryova daughter of Captain Snegiryov
- Izzur Ortsuev – Aslan Movsarov, Alyona's boyfriend
- Sergey Bezrukov — Vladimir Grigorevich Snegiryov, police captain, Alyona's father and illegitimate son of Yulia Snegiryova and Grigory Zemlyanikin
- Karen Badalov – Ibrahim Movsarov, Aslan's father
- Pavel Barshak — Erkhov, co-pilot of the aircraft
- Gosha Kutsenko — Professor, man in the "Zmei Gorynych" costume
- Aleksandr Robak — Senior Lieutenant Alexander Korovin, Snegiryov's partner
- Arno le Glannik – Francois, Olya Kravchuk's failed husband
- Irina Arkhipova – Olya, Evgeniy's wife
- Vera Brezhneva — as herself
- Inga Strelkova-Oboldina — aunt Katya, friend of Nastya's mother
- Roman Madyanov — employee of the State Traffic Safety Inspectorate

== Production ==
One segment of Yolki 2 was shot in Moscow on the first day of autumn on the Berezhkovskaya embankment. To create the effect of winter cold, as the action takes place on the eve of the New Year, the site near the Moscow business center was strewn with artificial snow made from a mixture of cellulose and water, and the heroes dressed in warm hats and down jackets and coats.

Ivan Urgant and Sergei Svetlakov improvised many of their lines for the film.
