= Sergei Trofimov (cinematographer) =

Russian cinematographer (born 1961)

- Born: May 19, 1961 (age 65); Moscow, Russian SFSR, Soviet Union
- Occupation: cinematographer
- Years active: 1994–present
- Website: http://sergeytrofimov.ru

Sergei Yurievich Trofimov (Russian: Сергей Юрьевич Трофимов; May 19, 1961 in Moscow, Russia) is a Russian cinematographer, known for his work with Timur Bekmambetov.

In 2008 he received the Nika Award for his work on the film Mongol.

== Selected filmography ==
- Peshavar Waltz (1994)
- Night Watch (2004)
- Day Watch (2006)
- Mongol (2007)
- The Irony of Fate 2 (2007)
- Black Lightning (2009)
- Yolki (2010)
- Yolki 2 (2011)
- Yolki 3 (2013)
- Yolki 1914 (2014)
- August Eighth (2012)
- He's a Dragon (2015)
- Gogol. The Beginning (2017)
- The Last Warrior (2017)
- Trotsky (2017)
- Bender: The Beginning (2021)
