= Timur Bekmambetov =

Russian-Kazakh filmmaker (born 1961)

- Темір Бекмамбетов
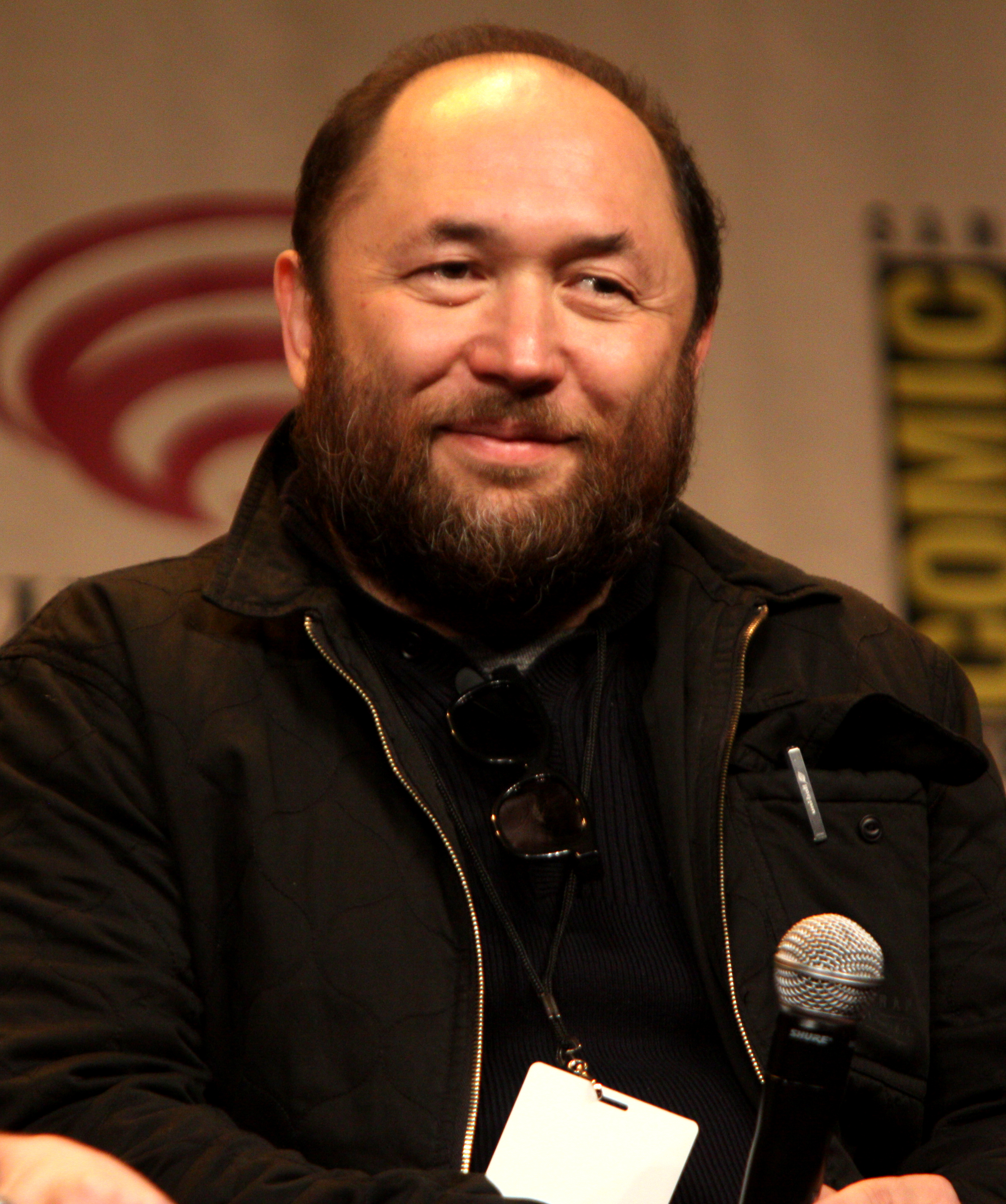
- Bekmambetov in 2012
- Born: Timur Nuruakhitovich Bekmambetov; 25 June 1961 (age 65); Guryev, Kazakh SSR, Soviet Union
- Education: Alexander Ostrovsky Theatrical and Artistic Institute
- Occupations: Film director; film producer; screenwriter

Timur Nuruakhitovich Bekmambetov (Note: Russian: Тимур Нуруахитович Бекмамбетов, pronounced [tʲɪˈmur nʊrʊɐˈxʲitəvʲɪt͡ɕ bʲɪkmɐmˈbʲetəf]; Kazakh: Темір Нұрбақытұлы Бекмамбетов, romanized: Temır Nūrbaqytūly Bekmambetov) (born 25 June 1961) is a Kazakh-Russian filmmaker and tech entrepreneur. He is best known for the fantasy epic Night Watch (2004), the action thriller Wanted (2008), and the historical horror film Abraham Lincoln: Vampire Hunter (2012), as well as for the screenlife films Unfriended (2015), Searching (2018), and War of the Worlds (2025).

== Early life ==
Bekmambetov was born on 25 June 1961 in the city of Atyrau, Kazakhstan (then part of the Soviet Union), formerly known as Guriev.

== Education ==
After graduation from school, Bekmambetov entered the Moscow Power Engineering Institute in 1979 and left it in 1980, on the eve of the 1980 Summer Olympics. He was deported from Moscow on the grounds of being "unreliable" and moved to Tashkent, Uzbek SSR, to study at the Alexander Ostrovsky Theatrical and Artistic Institute, from which he graduated in 1987 with a degree in theater and cinema set design.

== Film and television career ==
Bekmambetov started his career in the late 1980s as a production designer at the Ilkhom Theatre in Tashkent, Uzbekistan, and at Uzbek national film studio Uzbekfilm.

After the collapse of the Soviet Union, Bekmambetov moved from Uzbekistan to Moscow, where he started making commercials for the Russian market. His commercial series World History, retelling life episodes of the world's prominent rulers (from Nero and Tamerlan to Napoleon and the last Russian emperor Nicholas), is still considered the best video advertising in Russia. In 1994, he founded Bazelevs, an advertising and film production company, in Russia. Its advertising division continues making commercials for major Russian and international brands; in 2021, its commercial featuring Apple's new iPhone in the Hermitage Museum interiors was nominated for the Cannes Lions festival.

Bekmambetov's directorial debut was Peshavar Waltz (1994) depicting the war fought by the USSR in Afghanistan. The film was dubbed in English as Escape from Afghanistan and released direct-to-video by Roger Corman in 2002. In 1998, Corman invited Bekmambetov to direct his production of The Arena (2001) starring Karen McDougal and Lisa Dergan. A remake of the 1974 gladiator exploitation film of the same name, it marked Bekmambetov's English-language debut.

In 2004, Bekmambetov wrote and directed Night Watch (2004), a Russian fantasy film based on the book by Sergey Lukyanenko. The film was the first Russian production which, after the demise of the Soviet Union, managed to top the domestic box office, making $16.7 million in Russia alone, thus overtaking The Lord of the Rings: The Fellowship of the Ring. The sequel to Night Watch, Day Watch (2006), was likewise written and directed by Bekmambetov and set a new record for the Russian domestic box office, having grossed more than $26 million in the first two weeks. The Russian blockbuster epic attracted the attention of Fox Searchlight Pictures, which paid $4 million to acquire the worldwide distribution rights (excluding Russia and the Baltic states). In 2010, Night Watch was named among the 100 Best Films of World Cinema by Empire. The film also received positive reactions from American directors Quentin Tarantino and James Gunn.

Bekmambetov's Hollywood directorial debut was Universal's action thriller Wanted (2008), an adaptation of the graphic novel series created by Mark Millar and J. G. Jones. Starring Angelina Jolie, James McAvoy and Morgan Freeman, the action film grossed $341 million worldwide, and became Universal's highest grossing R-rated film, as well as earning two Oscar nominations.

In 2009, alongside Tim Burton and Jim Lemley, Bekmambetov produced an animated film titled 9 (2009), the story of a rag doll in a post-apocalyptic world, directed by Shane Acker.

In 2011, Bekmambetov produced the science fiction thriller Apollo 18, together with The Weinstein Company, and the science fiction film The Darkest Hour set in Moscow and produced by New Regency.

In 2012, Bekmambetov directed and produced the live-action adaptation of Seth Grahame-Smith's novel – Abraham Lincoln, Vampire Hunter, together with Tim Burton and Jim Lemley. He was awarded the 2012 International Filmmaker of the Year award by the National Association of Theatre Owners.

In 2013, Variety (Russian Edition) named Bekmambetov one of the most commercially successful Russian directors of the decade.

In 2016, Bekmambetov directed Ben-Hur, the fifth film adaptation of the novel Ben-Hur: A Tale of the Christ by Lew Wallace. At the same time, he produced the action film Hardcore Henry, directed by Ilya Naishuller, using the perspective of a first-person shooter.

In 2017, Bekmambetov produced the historical drama The Current War starring Benedict Cumberbatch, Tom Holland, Nicholas Hoult and Michael Shannon. The film was inspired by the 19th-century war of currents between Thomas Edison and George Westinghouse.

In 2021, Bekmambetov directed the WW2 action film V2. Escape from Hell, with its aircraft battle scenes using the War Thunder game engine. The film was released in Russia both theatrically as a feature and on a streaming platform as a smartphone-only vertical series.

In 2021, Deadline announced that Bekmambetov would be bringing to the screen a new universe based on the unexploited works in the horror genre by the Marvel Сomics creator Stan Lee.

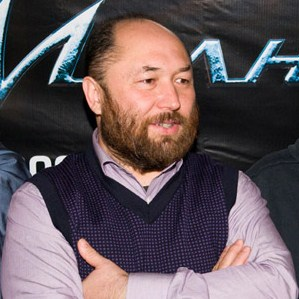
Bekmambetov in 2009.

In December 2022, Bekmambetov sold the Bazelevs film studio in Russia to its general producer, Lala Rustamova, and commercial director, Timur Asadov. Bekmambetov has completely retired from the Russian business, but the studio will continue to cooperate with him as a filmmaker and screenwriter.

In 2024, he signed to Artist International Group.

=== Screenlife filmmaking ===
Bekmambetov is the pioneer of the screenlife filmmaking movement, thus responding to people's life migrating to the digital world of mobile gadgets. In a screenlife film, viewers see the action play out from the POV of the computers, tablets or smartphones used by the characters.

In 2015, Bekmambetov's debut screenlife production, the teen horror Unfriended, was picked up by Universal, grossing $65 million worldwide with a budget of $1 million; three years later, a sequel, Unfriended: Dark Web, appeared.

Bekmambetov followed that up with the 2018 thriller led by John Cho, Searching, grossing more than $75 million worldwide.

In 2019, he produced the ten-episode series Dead of Night for Snapchat, with the story revolving around a viral outbreak that turns people into zombies. It scored over 16 million viewers in the first releasing month, and got extended for the second season.

In 2020, Universal and Bekmambetov signed a deal to partner on five Hollywood features to be made in the screenlife format in various genres.

In 2021, Focus Features released Profile, Bekmambetov's first directorial feature in the screenlife format, where a reporter goes online to catch a Jihadi recruiter to get a story on why and how European women join ISIS. Inspired by the 2015 nonfiction bestseller In the Skin of a Jihadist by a French journalist Anna Erelle, Profile won the 2018 Audience Award by Berlin Film Festival.

Bekmambetov's recent screenlife production, R#J, a Gen Z adaptation of Shakespeare's Romeo and Juliet, premiered at Sundance 2021 and won a special prize at SXSW.

The invention of the screenlife filmmaking technique brought Bekmambetov's Bazelevs a spot among Fast Company's 2021 World's Most Innovative Companies.

== Personal life ==
Bekmambetov owns the former Walt Disney mansion in Los Angeles.

Bekmambetov is married to Russian urbanist Natalia Fishman-Bekmambetova, who worked on the restoration of Gorky Park in Moscow and the renovation of the city of Kazan.

=== Political views ===
In a 2007 editorial about Day Watch in The Guardian, Bekmambetov compared president Vladimir Putin to the film's "light ones," saying "[Light and dark] doesn't mean good and bad. Dark means freedom and light means responsibility — and, in real life, Putin, for sure, is a light one. He is trying to fix everything, make everything organised somehow. But it's very bad for freedom."

In 2022, Bekmambetov condemned Russia's invasion of Ukraine, and called the boycott of Russian films in the West "emotional, sincere and reasonable."

== Filmography ==
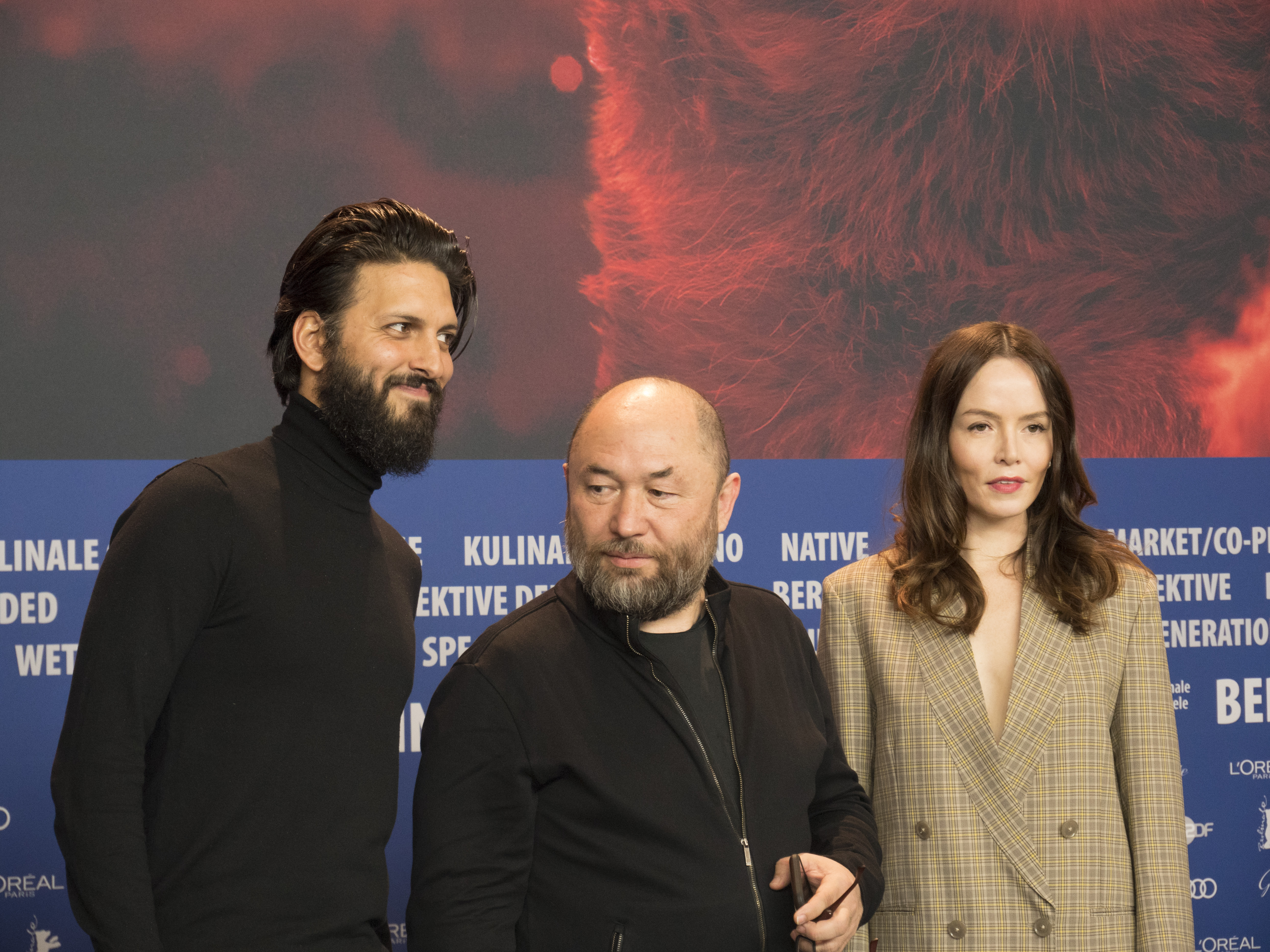
Press conference of Profile at Berlinale 2018. Shazad Latif, Timur Bekmambetov and Valene Kane.

Year	Title	Credited as		
Year	Title	Director	Producer	Writer
1994	Peshavar Waltz	Yes	No	Yes
2001	The Arena	Yes	No	No
2004	Night Watch	Yes	No	Yes
2006	Day Watch	Yes	No	Yes
2007	The Irony of Fate 2	Yes	Yes	No
2008	Wanted	Yes	No	No
2010	Yolki	Yes	Yes	No
2011	Yolki 2	No	Yes	Yes
2012	Abraham Lincoln: Vampire Hunter	Yes	Yes	No
2014	Squirrels	No	Yes	Yes
2014	Yolki 1914	Yes	Yes	No
2016	Yolki 5	Yes	Yes	No
2016	Ben-Hur	Yes	No	No
2018	Profile	Yes	Yes	Yes
2021	V2. Escape from Hell	Yes	Yes	No
2026	Mercy	Yes	Yes	No

Producer only

- 9 (2009)
- Black Lightning (2009)
- Lucky Trouble (2011)
- Apollo 18 (2011)
- The Darkest Hour (2011)
- KikoRiki: Team Invincible (2011)
- The Snow Queen (2012)
- Yolki 3 (2013)
- Alisa Knows What to Do! (2013)
- Kiss Them All! (2013)
- Hardcore Henry (2015)
- The Snow Queen 2: The Snow King (2015)
- Unfriended (2015)
- Paws, Bones & Rock'n'roll (2015)
- Hack the Bloggers (2016)
- Yolki 6 (2017)
- The Age of Pioneers (2017)
- He's a Dragon (2017)
- The Current War (2017)
- Searching (2018)
- Unfriended: Dark Web (2018)
- Persian Lessons (2020)
- R#J (2021)
- Missing (2023) (executive producer)
- War of the Worlds (2025)
- LifeHack (2025)

== Music videos ==
- Yulia Chicherina – "Tu-lu-la"
- Yulia Chicherina – "Zhara"
- Linkin Park – "Powerless"
