= Yolki 5 =

- Directed by: Timur Bekmambetov; Alexander Kott; Vadim Perelman; Indar Zhendubaev; Andrei Shavkero; Maria Likhachova; Roman Nepomnyaschiy
- Written by: Roman Nepomnyaschiy; Dmitry Pinchukov; Vadim Seleznev; Grigory Shatokhin; Andrei Shavkiro; Maxim Sveshnikov; Vadim Sveshnikov; Roman Cantor; Jaroslava Pulinovich; Timur Ezugbai
- Produced by: Timur Bekmambetov; Iva Stromilova
- Starring: Ivan Urgant; Sergey Svetlakov; Kirill Pletnyov; Katerina Shpitsa
- Narrated by: Konstantin Khabensky
- Cinematography: Sergey Kozlov; Pavel Kapinos; Vladimir Ushakov; Levan Kapanadze; Denis Panov; Pavel Trubnikov; Andrey Vakorin
- Music by: Pavel Yesenin; Yuriy Poteyenko; Ilya Lagutenko; Vladimir Osinsky; Sergey Kashirin
- Production company: Bazelevs
- Release date: 22 December 2016
- Running time: 88 minutes
- Country: Russia
- Language: Russian
- Budget: $3,526,000
- Box office: $13,155,692

Yolki 5
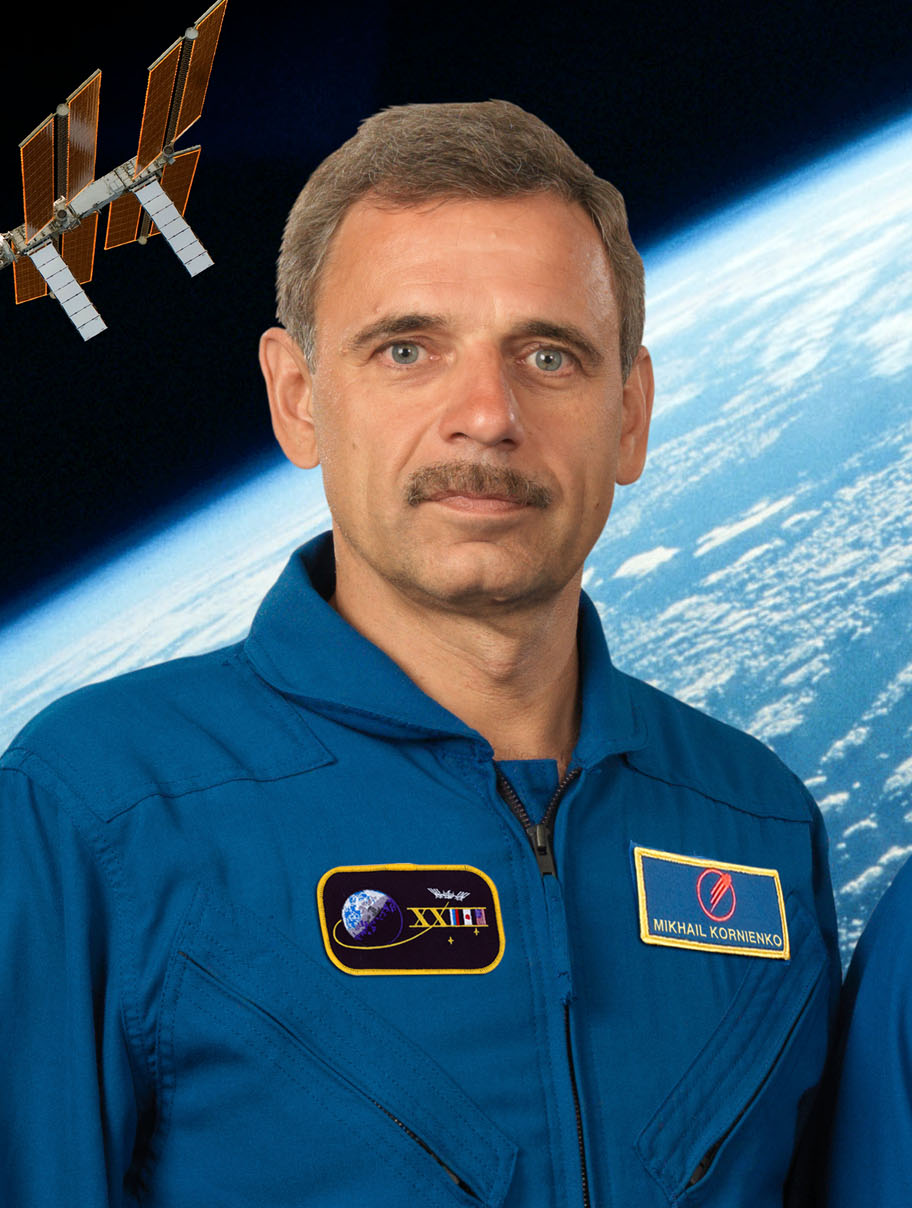
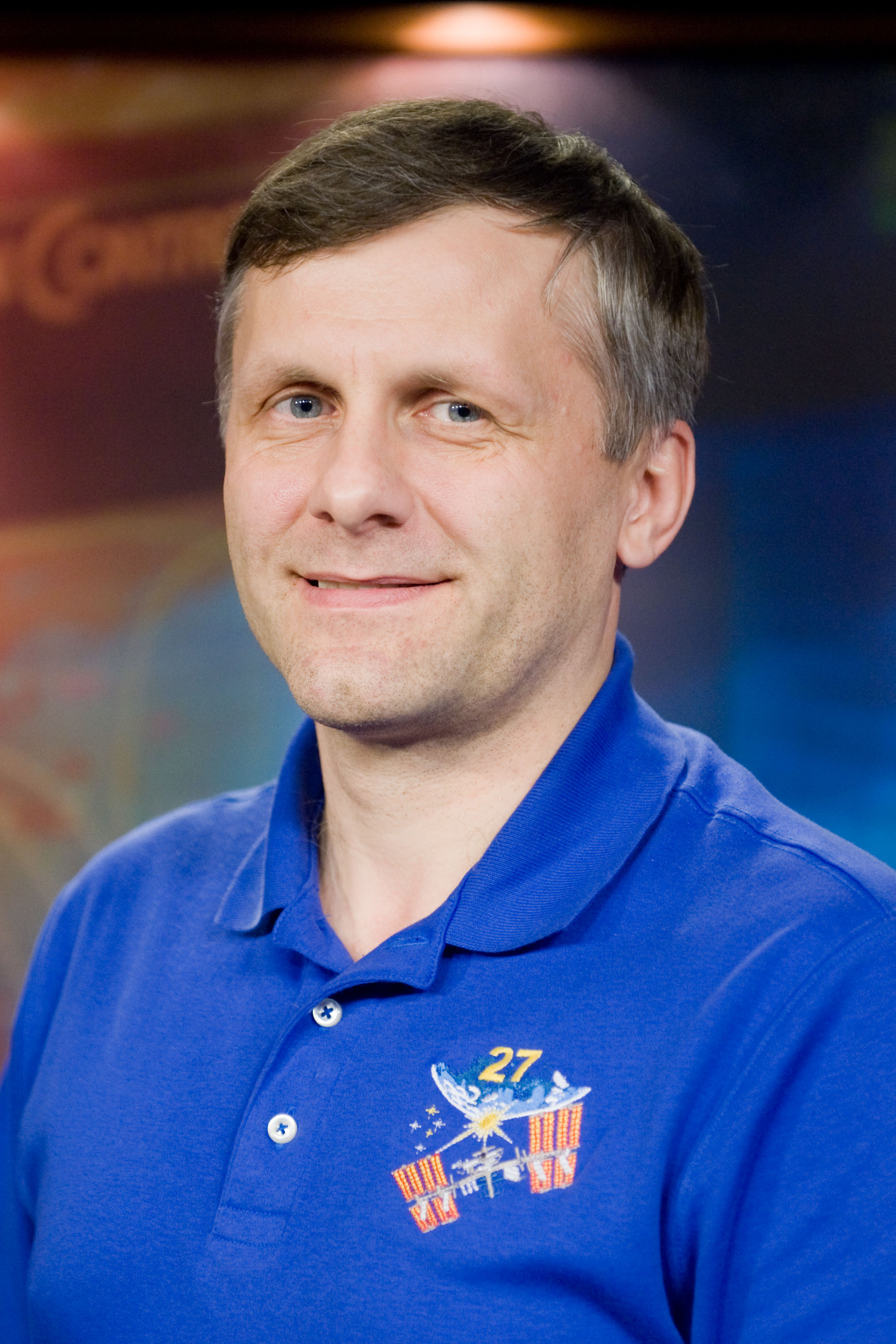
- Astronauts from Soyuz TMA-18M and Soyuz MS-02 that were the cast launched to ISS for the film
- Space career

A Film Shot On Space Station
- Time in space: Various (Note: varies with astronaut, that is, 340d 8h 43m for Mikhail Kornienko and 173d 3h 16m Andrey Borisenko but mission is counted during their time in 2016) (~3-4 minutes of production)
- Mission: Soyuz TMA-18M (Expedition 46, ISS year-long mission) /Soyuz MS-02 (Expedition 49) (Equipment along with space cast)
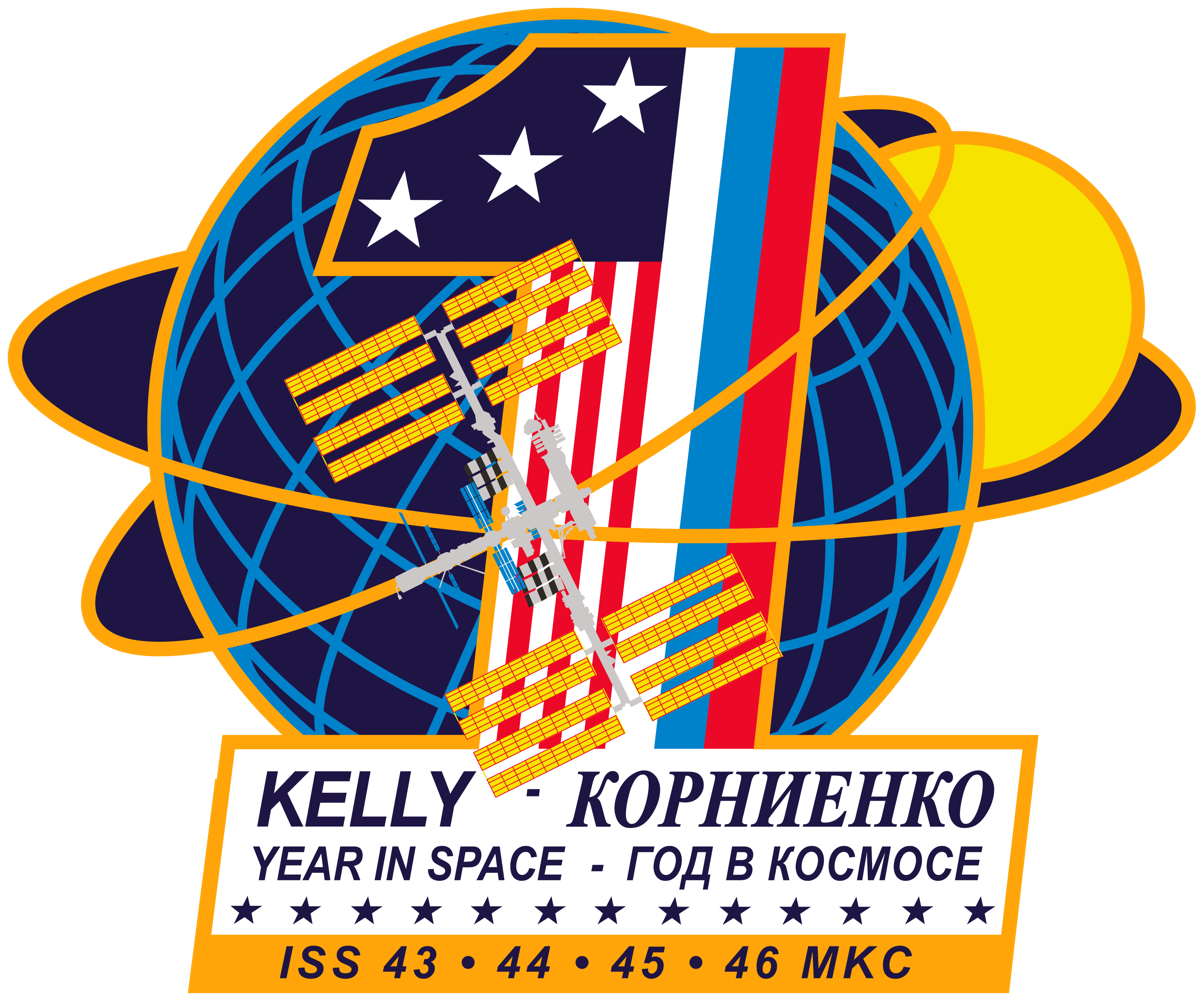
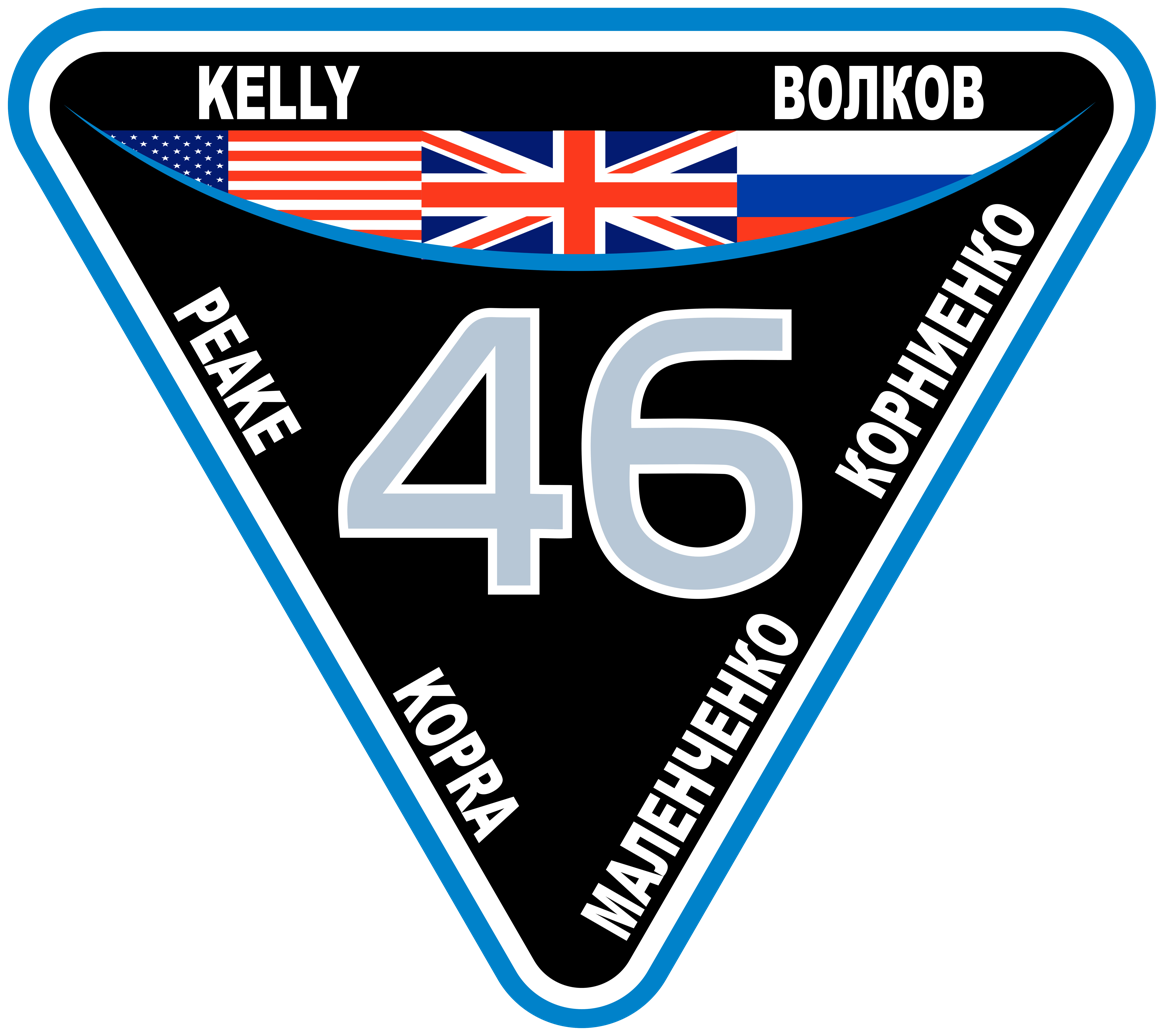
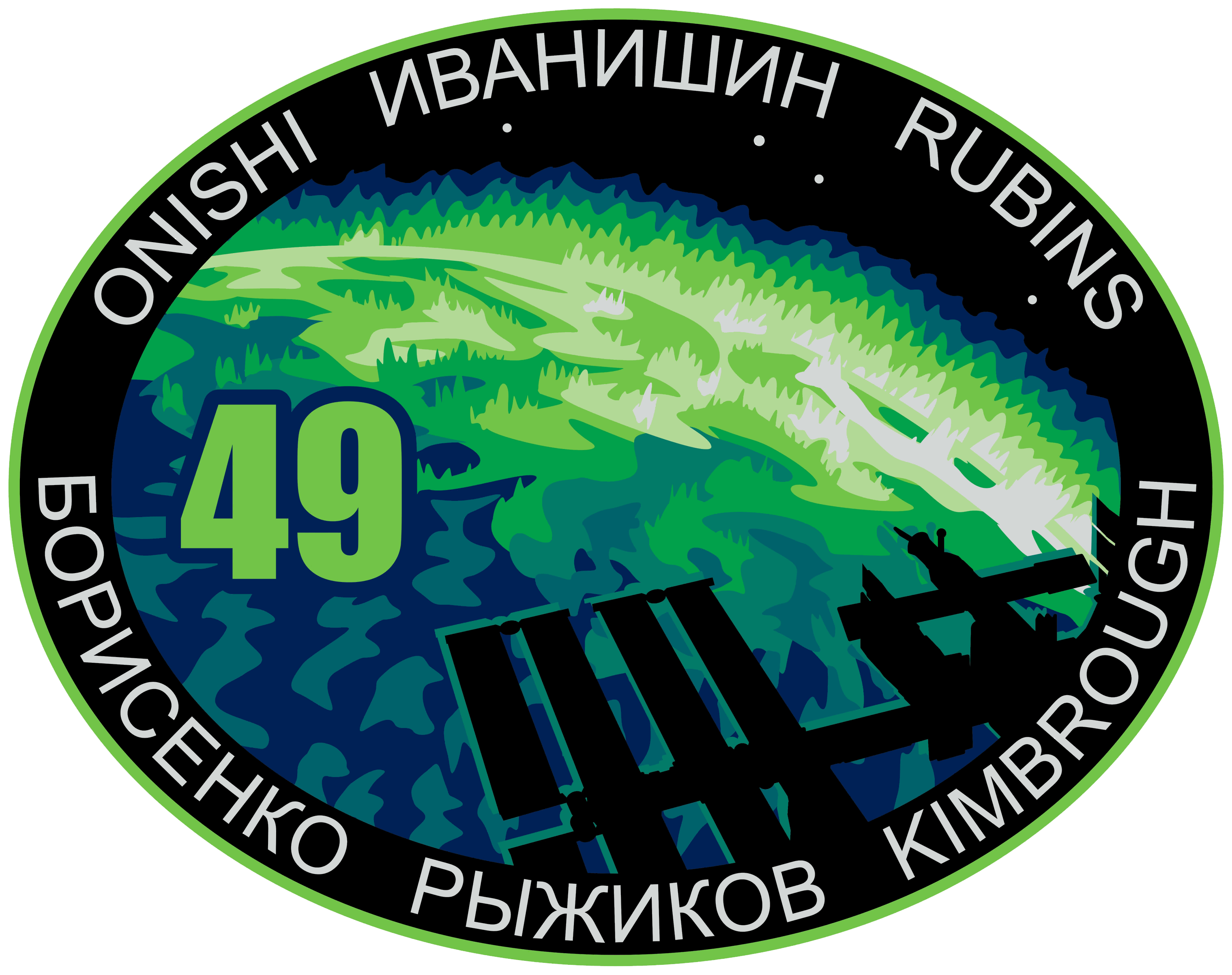
- Mission insignia

Yolki 5 (Russian: Ёлки 5, meaning Christmas Trees 5 or Those Christmas Trees), is a 2016 Russian comedy film starring Ivan Urgant, Sergey Svetlakov, Kirill Pletnev, Katerina Shpitsa, Anna Khilkevich, Gosha Kutsenko, Maria Shukshina, Alexander Golovin. It was released in Russia on December 22, 2016 as the sequel to Yolki 1914. The television premiere took place on July 6, 2018 on the television channel Russia-1.

The film was received negatively by both critics and viewers, who criticized the plot and acting, although the performances of Urgant and Svetlakov were highly praised. Despite this, it grossed about 13 million dollars worldwide, becoming a box office success.

The next film in the franchise, Yolki 6, was released on December 21, 2017.

== Plot ==
=== Segment with Boris and Evgeniy ===
Boris has separated from his wife and wishes that everything would return to the way it was. Evgeniy tries to help him reconcile with his wife, but he does not suspect that Boris is planning to steal a penguin from Evgeniy's zoo, which he wants to give as a gift to his son.

=== Segment with Andrei ===
Andrei who had many girlfriends in the past, finally settles down. But he is jealous and constantly tests his wife for infidelity.

=== Segment with Snowboarder and the Skier ===
The snowboarder and the skier invite girls to their apartment. But the boys have been so distracted with computer games that they have forgotten to buy a Christmas tree. The girls threaten to leave if the guys fail to find and deliver a Christmas tree for them.

=== Segment with Konstantin ===
Konstantin is convinced that the way he meets the New Year will affect the rest of it. For this reason, he seeks in every possible way to attract the attention of Zhenechka and dissuade her, so that she does not marry another man.

=== Segment with Manya ===
Manya knows that it is possible to find everything and everyone on the internet, so she decides to find her old flame online. But there is one problem: she must be taught how to use a computer. Varya and Vova come to the rescue. They will have to face romantic desires.

== Cast ==
- Ivan Urgant as Boris Vorobiev
- Sergey Svetlakov as Evgeny Pavlovich
- Elena Plaksina as Olya, wife of Boris, mother of little Boris
- Irina Arkhipova as Olya, wife of Evgeny
- Alexander Golovin as Dimon Fomenko "tanker"
- Alexander Domogarov Jr. as Grisha Zemlyanikin "tanker"
- Anna Khilkevich as Lesya, Dimon's
- Gosha Kutsenko as Professor Andrei Nikolaevich
- Maria Shukshina as Natasha, wife of Andrei Nikolaevich
- Kirill Pletnyov as Kostya
- Katerina Shpitsa as Zhenya
- Jan Tzapnik as Makar, seller of the penguin
- Aleksandr Robak as Alexander Korovin
- Anastasia Smetanina as Katya, girlfriend of Grisha
- Galina Stakhanova as old woman Manya
- Irina Chipizhenko as Tatyana, longtime acquaintance Manya, lift operator
- Yuri Tsurilo as head of platform
- Baimurat Allaberiyev as Yusuf, janitor
- Adylbek Atykhaev as Ibrahim, janitor
- Victor Nizovoi as police player with the nickname "The Bottle of Honey"
- Aleksei Petrenko as Grigory Pavlovich Zemlyanikin, uncle of Boris
- Irina Alfyorova as Yuliya Snegireva, wife of Zemlyanikin
- Alina Bulynko as Varya
- Sergey Pokhodayev as Vova
- Mikhail Kornienko as himself, filmed in actual space onboard ISS.
- Andrey Borisenko as himself, filmed in actual space onboard ISS.
- Sasha Spielberg as herself
- Yang Gordienko as himself
- Julia Pushman as herself
- Karina Kasparyants as herself
- Marie Senne as herself
- Elena Sheydlina as herself
- Valeria Lubarsky as herself
- Dmitry Ivanov as himself

== Production ==
Yolki 5 consists of seven segments which unfold in Moscow, Saint Petersburg, Sochi, Chelyabinsk, Perm, Yekaterinburg, on the oil platform Prirazlomnaya, located in the Barents Sea and at the International Space Station at an altitude of 400 km above the ground.
