= Sergei Lukyanenko bibliography =

Sergey Lukyanenko
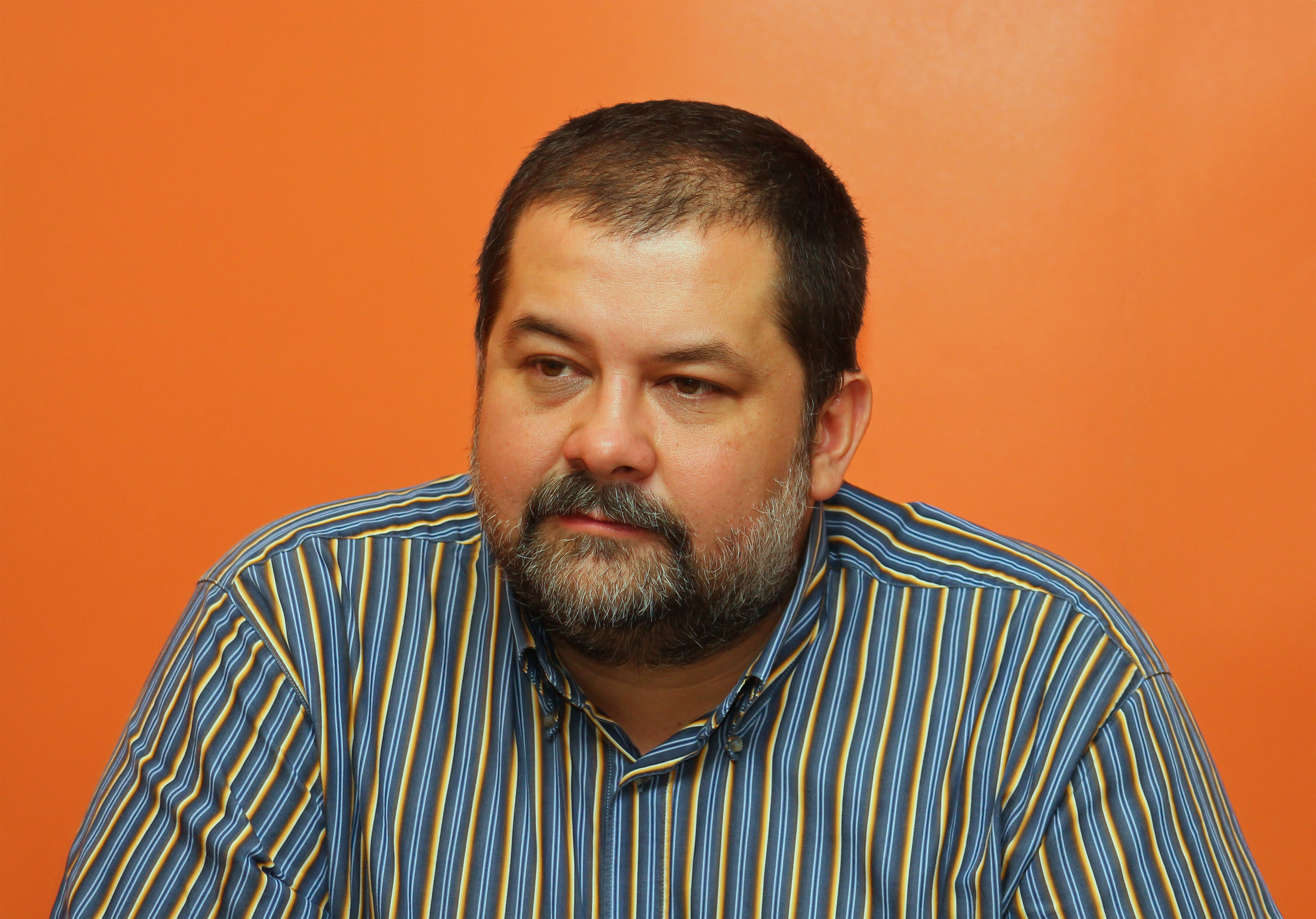
- Sergey Lukyanenko in 2011
- Born: April 11, 1968; Karatau, Kazakh SSR, Soviet Union
- Occupations: Writer, psychiatrist
- Writing career
- Language: Russian
- Years active: 1986–present
- Genres: Science fiction, fantasy
- Notable works: Knights of Forty Islands, Island Russia trilogy (with Juliy Burkin), Nuclear Dream, Night Watch series
- Website: lukianenko.ru

This is the bibliography of Sergei Lukyanenko.

== Sergey Lukyanenko ., et al. (1990), Knights of Forty Islands ==
The story is about several contemporary teenagers "copied" into an artificial environment, where they are forced to play a game with very harsh rules. The action is set on a set of small sand islands, which are interconnected by narrow bridges, and all the world is under a giant dome, similar to the one from "The Truman show". Inhabitants of each island try to conquer their neighbors. The mission is difficult primarily due to the fact that forces on each island are roughly equal in ability. Once one group takes over its neighbor island, it bears human losses and becomes vulnerable for an attack from a third side. The goal of the game is to take over all 40 islands, which is practically impossible to achieve. However, if they do so, the winning group will be sent back home. All children die at the age of 18, if they are not killed before. They use only cold weapons. A person who breaks the rules of the game usually accidentally dies or is killed shortly after such violation. The people also believe that they are part of some experiment, run by aliens, but have no idea where they are and what the goals of the experiment are.

The novel, harsh and romantic, mixes various genres, such as "sword and planet", "simulated reality" and "children violence".

== Sergey Lukyanenko ., et al. (1990), Nuclear Dream ==
=== Island Russia ===
Trilogy, co-authored with Juliy Burkin.

Original title "Сегодня, мама!", "Остров Русь", "Царь, царевич, король, королевич" Transliterated title "Sevodnya, mama!", "Ostrov Russ", "Tsar, tsarevich, korol, korolevich" English title "Today, mom!", "Island Russia", "Tsar, tsarevich, king, prince"	ISBN 5-17-023041-9 Genre Children's fantasy Written 1993–94, Tomsk, Almaty

Two brothers stumble upon a time machine hidden in an artifact dating back to Ancient Egypt. They find themselves in the future, where a Sphinx named Shidla helps them escape and goes with them on an adventure spanning thousands of years of history.

The first novel was adapted into a film called Asiris Nuna. The name comes from the supposed Ancient Egyptian phrase meaning "good night." The phrase is never mentioned in the book.

=== A Lord from Planet Earth ===
Trilogy

An action-filled space opera with evolving characters. Each subsequent book involves more ethical problems and philosophy, while at the same time the scale of action steadily increases. This is Lukianenko's only major work that is partially set in the same imaginary universe as the "Road to Wellesberg" series of short stories.

Original title "Принцесса стоит смерти" Transliterated title "Princessa stoit smerti" English title "A princess is worth dying for"	ISBN 5-17-018695-9 Genre Space opera Written 1991–92, Almaty

In the novella "A princess is worth dying for", we follow Serge, a young retired sergeant of the Army of the country that now ceased to exist, who accidentally met and loved a princess. After five years she calls him for help. Serge agrees at once to join her in another planet, Turr. The book depicts much fighting with original weapons (the most effective are plane swords), and also talks about galactic laws. Serge is not a weak character, and he is shown as valuing life more than his enemies do. The thread going through this book is the worth of love, and what can't be done even for the sake of love.

Original title "Планета, которой нет" Transliterated title "Planeta, kotoroy net" English title "The planet which doesn't exist"	ISBN 5-17-018675-4 Genre Space opera Written 1991–92, Almaty

With the main Enemy eliminated, why can't Serge just live with the Princess?

The ancient vanished civilization, the "Seeders" (who seem to have born all known galactic races), left a Temple at each inhabited planet. A Temple is both a keeper of galactic customs, and a beacon for flights in hyperspace – a selection of four beacons defines a destination in 3D space. The Earth is the only planet without a Temple, and no known combination of beacons leading to it. The people of Turr will not accept a Prince from a non-existent planet; and besides that, the Princess doesn't love Serge...

The second book is devoted to efforts of Serge and his friends to find the Earth. It involves well-thought and credible starship battles, etc. Surprisingly, Serge finds a boy from Earth. This, and some other accidents, convince Serge's crew that they have an unknown enemy. A sect called "The Descendants of Seeders" also wants to find "the planet which doesn't exist," to explode a quark bomb on it (a terrible weapon, turning a whole planet to atomic dust), thinking that only this will bring the Seeders back and make the universe wonderful. Who will reach the Earth first? It becomes a race for survival.

Original title "Стеклянное Море" Transliterated title "Steklannoe More" English title "Sea of Glass"	ISBN 5-17-008814-0, ISBN 5-9577-0275-7 Genre Space opera Written 1991–92, Almaty

The action in the final book approaches the level of total war between two interstellar civilizations with incompatible basic values — and the protagonists are forced to be between the upper and the nether millstone. Despite harsh action, the style remains poetic, even metaphoric — Serge will have to deal with a different culture whose values are based on beauty.

=== The Boy and the Darkness ===
Original title "Мальчик и Тьма" (a.k.a. "Солнечный Котенок", a.k.a. "Дверь во Тьму) Transliterated title "Mal'chik i T'ma" (a.k.a. "Solnechniy Kotenok", a.k.a. "Dver vo T'mu") English title "The Boy and the Darkness" (a.k.a. "Sunny Kitten", a.k.a. "Door into Darkness")	ISBN 5-17-022345-5 Genre Young adult fantasy Written 1993–1994, Almaty

Partial English translation available online.

A fantasy novel where a modern boy, Danny, comes to a world without sunlight. According to the inhabitants, the sunlight was sold a long time ago to some evil entity. In order to get back home, Danny needs to find some sunlight, or other instance of a matter called "True Light", that could help him open a door back into the real world. All the people are divided into the good Wingers, that live in cities, and the bad Flyings, that live in towers. The Wingers are descendants of the people who sold the sunlight, and the Flyings are a kind of undead who serve a Dark Lord. They are both capable of flying, and continuously fight each other in small local clashes. The plot is a quest, similar to Stephen King's "The Talisman". Danny joins the side of the Wingers, and starts his journey attempting to acquire "True Light".

=== Line of Delirium ===
Trilogy

Original title "Линия Грез" Transliterated title "Linia Grez" English title "Line of Delirium"	ISBN 5-237-00968-9, ISBN 5-17-003247-1, ISBN 5-17-010734-X Genre Space opera Written 1995, Almaty

Original title "Императоры Иллюзий" Transliterated title "Imperatory Illuziy" English title "Emperors of Illusions"	ISBN 5-17-004497-6 Genre Space opera Written 1995, Almaty

- "Sword of Rumatha" Stranger award.

=== Autumn Visits ===
Original title "Осенние визиты" Transliterated title "Osennie Vizity" English title "Autumn Visits"	ISBN 5-15-000833-8, ISBN 5-320-00173-8 (1999 - ISBN 5-237-03085-8) Genre Urban fantasy Written 1995–1996, Almaty

- "Sigma-F" SF Forum award.

=== Not the time for dragons ===
Co-authored with Nick Perumov.

Original title "Не время для драконов" Transliterated title "Ne vremya dlya drakonov" English title "Wrong time for dragons"	ISBN 5-17-001096-6, ISBN 5-17-003391-5, ISBN 5-17-006623-6 Genre Fantasy Written 1997, Almaty, Moscow

=== Labyrinth ===
Trilogy

Original title "Лабиринт Отражений" Transliterated title "Labirint Otrazheniy" English title "Labyrinth of Reflections"	ISBN 5-237-00878-X, ISBN 5-7921-0141-8, ISBN 5-17-002803-2, ISBN 5-17-004720-7 Genre Cyberpunk Written 1996, Almaty

This book is one of a "human mind inside of virtual reality" theme. It tells about virtual reality called "The Deep" and its main, and perhaps only city named "Deeptown". The book has written slightly before the web becomes popular, so some original fictional technologies are invented. The people from real world can get inside and achieve "full presence" effect using special psycho visual interface, called "deep-program". Due to that access to The Deep relatively expensive, most of the visitors spend only limited time inside. Once get inside, the people are able to detach their mind from The Deep only at the special "exit points," that usually look like various exits at the real world, e.g. doors, restrooms, "end-level" buttons, etc.. The protagonist of the novel, Leonid, belongs to very rare kind of people who are able to enter and exit The Deep whenever they want, without using exit points. This ability makes them almost impossible to be harmed or caught by other people within The Deep. They are often hired for spying on or intruding other organizations and businesses. Also they're used to rescue the people, who are jammed out of exit points or can't exit The Deep alone. The story reaches its climax when Leonid realizes that he stalks a man who exists in The Deep on its own, without being connected from a real world.

- "Big Zilant" Zilantcon award.

Original title "Фальшивые Зеркала" Transliterated title "Falshivie Zerkala" English title "False Mirrors"	ISBN 5-17-007881-1 Genre Cyberpunk Written 1998, Moscow

- "Silver Kladutsey" Star Bridge award.

Original title "Прозрачные Витражи" Transliterated title "Prozrachnye Vitrazhi" English title "Transparent stained-glass windows"	ISBN NONE Genre Cyberpunk Written 2000, Moscow

=== The Stars Are Cold Toys — Star Shadow ===
Original title "Звезды - холодные игрушки" Transliterated title "Zvezdy - holodnie igrushki" English title "The Stars Are Cold Toys"	ISBN 5-237-00345-1 (1997 - ISBN 5-7921-0170-1, ISBN 5-7841-0718-6) Genre Space opera Written 1996–97, Moscow

Original title "Звездная Тень" Transliterated title "Zvezdnaya Ten" English title "Star Shade"	ISBN 5-17-010928-8 Genre Space opera Written 1996–97, Moscow

=== World of Watches ===
Hexalogy

==== Night Watch (aka, "The Night Watch Series"") ====
Original title "Ночной Дозор" Transliterated title "Nochnoi Dozor" English title "Night Watch"	ISBN 5-237-01511-5, ISBN 5-17-004133-0, ISBN 5-17-008498-6, ISBN 5-9577-0828-3 Genre Urban fantasy Written 1998, Moscow Published In English 6 July 2006

- "Stranger" award in the nomination "Major form".
- "Silver Kladutsey" Star Bridge award.

==== Day Watch ====
Original title "Дневной Дозор" Transliterated title "Dnevnoy Dozor" English title "Day Watch"	ISBN 5-237-04795-5, ISBN 5-17-003290-0, ISBN 5-17-008349-1, ISBN 5-9660-0228-2 Genre Urban fantasy Written 2000, Moscow

Co-authored with Vladimir Vasilyev.

- "Gold Kladutsey" Star Bridge award.
- "Gold Ruscon" Ruscon award.

==== Twilight Watch ====
Original title "Сумеречный Дозор" Transliterated title "Sumerechniy Dozor" English title "Twilight Watch"	ISBN 5-17-021088-4, ISBN 5-9577-0808-9 Genre Urban fantasy Written 2003, Moscow

- "Silver Ruscon" Ruscon award.
- "Gold Kladutsey" Star Bridge award.

==== The Last Watch ====
Original title "Последний Дозор" Transliterated title "Posledniy Dozor" English title "The Last Watch"	ISBN 5-17-035440-1, ISBN 5-9713-1468-8 Genre Urban fantasy Written 2006, Moscow

In the final novel "Последний Дозор" the main character Gorodetsky deals with a group of people that organize the Last Watch to empower their abilities and find the artifacts of great Merlin.

==== The New Watch ====
Original title "Новый Дозор" Transliterated title "Novyi Dozor" English title "The New Watch"	ISBN 978-0-434-02224-3 Genre Urban fantasy Written 2011, Moscow

==== The Sixth Watch ====
Original title "Шестой Дозор" Transliterated title "Shestoi Dozor" English title "The Sixth Watch"	Genre Urban fantasy Written 2014, Moscow

=== Genome ===
Trilogy

Original title "Геном" Transliterated title "Genom" English title "Genome"	ISBN 5-17-004496-8 Genre Space opera, parody Written 2000, Moscow

The story is set in the future, where genetic engineering has become a commonplace. The embryo's DNA can be altered to make a future "specialist" - a human genetically adapted to a specific job. Specializations range anywhere from a "politician" to "prostitute". This book deals with a specialist-master-pilot, who, when assigned a mission, is forced to deal with the very essence and personality of being genetically altered, and not just with himself, but his diverse crew on board a starship.

- "Best literature murder of Yuriy Semetskiy" award.

Original title "Танцы на снегу" Transliterated title "Tantsy na snegu" English title "Dances on the Snow"	ISBN 5-17-007792-0 Genre Space opera Written 2001, Moscow

- "Alisa" Ruscon award.

=== Seekers of the Sky ===
Duology

Original title "Холодные Берега" Transliterated title "Holodnye Berega" English title "Cold Shores"	ISBN 5-17-010363-8 Genre Steampunk Written 2001, Moscow

Two thousand years ago, a God-Man came into the world. He created a great wonder and, before leaving, gave the people the Word, which allows them to do the impossible. But the Word is not known by all, and many wish to wield it. Often, those who possess the Word die a horrible death, refusing to give it up. However, it appears that a teenage boy who ended up in the prisoner hell of the Isles of Sorrow, does possess the Word. Many wish to catch young Marcus, who is capable of altering the fate of the world. Only one is willing to protect the boy - an experienced thief named Ilmar. But can he do it in a world where iron is more valuable than gold?

- "Russian S.F." Interpresscon award.

Original title "Близится Утро" Transliterated title "Blizitsya Utro" English title "Morning Nears"	ISBN 5-17-003363-X Genre Steampunk Written 2001, Moscow

Two thousand years ago, a man only known as the Redeemer appeared in this world, bringing with him the wonders, and dangers, of the Word — a divine power that many wish to possess. Now, a boy named Marcus has learned the Word and has the power to alter the fate of all humanity. For the Redeemer has returned. Within him... or with him...

- "Silver Kladutsey" Star Bridge award.

== Rough Draft ==
=== Spectrum ===
Original title "Спектр" Transliterated title "Spectr" English title "Spectrum"	ISBN 5-17-014364-8 Genre Space opera Written 2002, Moscow

- "Gold Ruscon" Ruscon award.
- "Big Urania" Kiyvcon award.
- "Sigma-F" SF Forum award.
- "Bronze snail" Interpresscon award.
- "Gold Kladutsey" Star Bridge award.

=== Short story collections ===
==== H is for Human ====
Original title "Л - значит Люди" Transliterated title "L - znachit Lyudi" English title "H is for Human"	ISBN 5-237-02803-9 Written 1988–1997, Almaty, Moscow

Beautiful away (Прекрасное далеко)

- My father is an antibiotic (Мой папа - антибиотик)
- Road to Wellesberg (Дорога на Веллесберг)
- The smell of freedom (Запах свободы)
- Almost spring (Почти весна)

H is for Human (Л - значит люди)

- Servant (Слуга)
- H is for Human (Л - значит люди)
- Visit (Визит)
- Train to the Warm Lands (Поезд в Теплый Край)
- The guide to Away (Проводник Отсюда)
- Master of the roads (Хозяин дорог)

The man that couldn't do very much (Человек, который многого не умел)

- Behind the Forest, where the cowardly enemy lurks (За лесом, где подлый враг...)
- The ability to pull the trigger (Способность спустить курок)
- Violation (Нарушение)
- In the name of Earth! (Именем Земли!)
- The man that couldn't do very much (Человек, который многого не умел)
- Captain (Капитан)
- Last chance (Последний шанс)
- Humans and nonhumans (Люди и не - люди)
- Category "Zed" (Категория "Зет")

Сasual Fuss (Временная суета)

- Сasual Fuss (Временная суета) - Short story, fanfiction.
- Caressing dreams of midnight (Ласковые мечты полуночи)

Poached fugu (Фугу в мундире)

- Duralumin sky (Дюралевое небо)
- Eastern ballad about a valourous cop (Восточная баллада о доблестном менте)
- Poached fugu (Фугу в мундире)

==== Nuclear Dream ====
Original title "Атомный Сон" Transliterated title "Atomnyi Son" English title "Nuclear Dream"	ISBN 5-17-012405-8 Written 1997–2001, Moscow

- Transparent Stained-Glass Windows (Прозрачные Витражи)
- Nuclear Dream (Атомный Сон)
- Evening Conference with the Mr Special Deputy (Вечерняя беседа с господином особым послом)
- Footsteps From Behind (Шаги за спиной)
- Ambassadors (Переговорщики)
- Achaula Lalapta (Ахауля Ляляпта)
- Men's Talk (Мужской разговор)
- Professional (Профессионал)
- Coincidence (Совпадение)
- Very Important Cargo (Очень важный груз)
- Age of Moving Pictures (Время движущихся картинок) (essay)
- Case History, or Games that Play People (История болезни, или Игры, которые играют в Людей)
- Night Watch (Ночной Дозор) (preliminary scenario)
- Coblandy-Batur and Barsa-Kelmes (Кобланды-батыр и Барса-Кельмес)
- Argentum Key (Аргентумный ключ)

==== Gadget ====
Original title "Гаджет" Transliterated title "Gadzjet" English title "Gadget"	ISBN 5-17-024018-X Written 2001–2004, Moscow

Building of the Epoch (Стройка века)

- Building of the Epoch (Стройка века)
- Come Off Clear (Сухими из воды)
- Buy a Cat (Купи кота)
- Bloody Orgy in the Martian Hell (Кровавая оргия в марсианском аду)
- If You Contact Us Right Now... (Если вы свяжетесь с нами прямо сейчас...)
- Girl with Chinese Lighters (Девочка с китайскими зажигалками)
- A New, New Fairy Tale (Новая, новая сказка)
- Don't Panic! (Без паники!)

Dive to the Stars (Донырнуть до звезд)

- We Are Not Slaves (Мы не рабы)
- Gadget (Гаджет)
- Dreamweaver (Плетельщица снов)
- I'm Not in Hurry (Не спешу)
- Dive to the Stars (Донырнуть до звезд)
- Evolution of the Scientific Worldview, Based on Fiction Samples (Эволюция научного мировоззрения на примерах из популярной литературы)
- From Columba to Hercules (От Голубя - к Гергулесу)
- Doctor Lem and Nanotechs (Доктор Лем и нанотехи)
- Nothing to Divide (Нечего делить)
- Nanotale (Наносказочка)

Note (Ремарка)

- New Novel "Note" (Ноый роман "Ремарка")
- Drill Away! (Провернуть назад!)
- Steamed Plots (Выпаренные сюжеты)
- If I Wrote "Red Riding Hood" (Если бы я писал "Красную Шапочку")

Recurring Funeral (Периодическая тризна)

- We Aren't Locals Here Ourselves... (Сами мы не местные...)
- Going to the Movies (Хождение в Кино)
- Recurring Funeral (Периодическая тризна)
- Apostles of the Tool (Апостолы инструмента)
- Cripples (Калеки)

=== Unpublished and early works ===
- Adventures of Stor (Пpиключения Стоpа) - 1989, Alma-ata, published only on the Internet.
- The 13th City (Тринадцатый гоpод) - 1989, Alma-ata, early work.
- Pier of the golden ships (Пpистань Желтых Коpаблей) - 1990, Alma-ata, early work.
- The Eighth Colour of the Rainbow(Восьмой цвет pадуги) - 1992, Alma-ata, early work.
- Competitors (Конкуренты) - 2008, Moscow

=== Incomplete works ===
- Credo (Кредо) - 2003, Moscow, still incomplete.
- Trix (Трикс) - 2005–2008, Moscow, author is working now.
