= Transparent Stained-Glass Windows =

2002 novel by Sergej Loekjanenko

- Author: Sergei Lukyanenko
- Original title: Прозрачные витражи
- Language: Russian
- Series: The Labyrinth trilogy
- Genre: Cyberpunk
- Publisher: AST (Russian edition)
- Publication date: 2002 (Russian edition),
- Publication place: Russia
- Media type: Print (Hardback)
- Pages: 83 pp (Russian edition)
- Preceded by: False Mirrors

Transparent Stained-Glass Windows (Russian: «Прозрачные витражи», romanized: Prozrachnyye vitrazhi) is the third novel in the Labyrinth trilogy of cyberpunk novels written by Russian science fiction writer Sergey Lukyanenko. Originally published online, the story features two endings, both of which are included when it was printed in the Atomic Dream anthology. Unlike the first two novels, Transparent Stained-Glass Windows is told from the point of view of a young female MVD operative who is sent to an isolated area of Deeptown, a virtual city created by Microsoft and IBM, to inspect the first virtual prison and locate any possible breakouts into Deeptown. She soon finds out that the prison is used by the Russian government to secretly conduct experiments on inmates. Throughout the story, she keeps referring to a jigsaw puzzle she began to complete during her childhood but never finished (one piece was missing).

== Characters ==
- Karina - young female in early 20s. Works as a virtual operative for Department of Justice. Sent to investigate a possible breakout from a virtual prison.
- Chingis - hacker-turned-businessman. Appears to be involved in the prison breakout but seems to be more concerned with stopping and exposing the experiments conducted by prison staff. After the events of the second novel, he apparently comes to terms with his acquired diver abilities.
- Anton Stekov (also known as Bastard) - one of the inmates in the virtual prison. Suspected of breaking out into Deeptown. Appears to be working with Chingis towards the same goal.. Apparently, he was born Anton Steklov but lost his passport. When he was issued a new one, the database lost one of the letters due to a glitch.
- Lieutenant Colonel Arkadiy Tomilin - virtual prison warden. In charge of the experiments conducted on prisoners. Courteous but suspicious of Karina. Believes she is not MVD but FSB.
