= False Mirrors =

2001 novel by Sergej Loekjanenko

- Russian edition cover
- Author: Sergei Lukyanenko
- Original title: Фальшивые зеркала
- Language: Russian
- Series: The Labyrinth trilogy
- Genre: Cyberpunk
- Publisher: AST (Russian edition)
- Publication date: 2001 (Russian edition),
- Publication place: Russia
- Media type: Print (Hardback)
- Pages: 416 (Russian edition)
- ISBN: 5-17-007881-1 (Russian 1st edition); ISBN 5-17-036814-3 (Russian 2nd edition)
- OCLC: 49418668
- Preceded by: Labyrinth of Reflections
- Followed by: Transparent Stained-Glass Windows

False Mirrors (Russian: Фальшивые зеркала) is the second novel in the Labyrinth trilogy of cyberpunk novels written by Russian science fiction writer Sergey Lukyanenko. The novel takes place two years after Labyrinth of Reflections.

== Plot ==
Former diver Leonid is a virtual mover. His relationship with his wife Vicka is strained. Due to deep psychosis, he has trouble distinguishing reality from the deep. Unlike Leonid, Vicka (a former diver) managed to let go of Deeptown and rarely ventures there. Additionally, an upgraded deep-program includes a built-in mandatory 24-hour timer. Leonid finds out that a hacker broke into a small development company and was attacked by its security forces. One of the virus weapons used on him killed the hacker in real life. Leonid contacts his old hacker friend Maniac, who now lives and works in the US and asks him if he knows the dead hacker. Maniac gives him a real-life Moscow address of a former acquaintance. Leonid goes there and finds himself in a luxurious apartment of a rich businessman named Chingiz. Another inhabitant of the giant two-story apartment is a hacker named Bastard and amateur hacker teenager Pat — Chingiz's protégé. Bastard explains that he was hired to hack the development company by a man calling himself the Dark Diver, who managed to retain his diver abilities. Bastard asked a 17-year-old hacker to help him break into the company and steal certain files. Apparently, the weapon uses a modified deep-program to cause cardiac arrest, which can only be reversed by immediate CPR. When Bastard reveals that the hacker's name was Roma, Leonid realizes that the dead hacker was a former diver. Leonid asks Chingiz for a virus pack, as he goes to search for the files Roma stole.

In Deeptown, he encounters a colleague of his from the delivery company, who informs him that he has a letter from Roma to be delivered to the mythical Temple of Diver-in-the-Deep. The letter can only be opened at destination, but Leonid doubts the place exists. He contacts several former divers and asks them for the location. The only one who responds is Dick (AKA Crazy Tosser), security chief of the popular Deeptown game "Labyrinth of Death". He informs Leonid that out of all divers, only three (Dick included) agreed to create the Temple as a monument to the lost diver community. Each hid their entrance at a familiar place. By now, only Dick's entrance exists, but it can only be accessed from the last level of the new "Labyrinth". At the same time, Dick offers Leonid a job at the company. Two years ago, Gunslinger (one of Leonid's avatars) shocked the "Labyrinth" as a master player. Dick believes that Leonid can still show the players a thing or two to promote the game as the legendary figure. Leonid responds that he will think about it, as he has other things on his mind. He tries out the new "Labyrinth" only to find out that the new game is impossible to beat without a good team. He returns to Chingiz's apartment (in Deeptown), which looks exactly like his real one, and discusses the situation with the three hackers. They agree to help him beat the game and find out why Roma died. At that moment, a shadowy figure enters the apartment and introduces himself as the Dark Diver. He attempts to convince them not to attempt the trip, but Pat shoots him, and the conversation erupts into a firefight. Pat is gunned down by a second-generation virus, as is Leonid, but not before he hits the Dark Diver with one too. When his computer refuses to turn on, Leonid calls Bastard and asks him to come over and look at the machine. Vicka comes home, and Leonid explains everything to her and what he plans to do. Bastard arrives and fixes Leonid's computer. He also asks Vicka if she will allow her husband to go back into the "Labyrinth", then she explains the nature of their strained relationship — Leonid never went to the train station to meet her for the first time.

Leonid tells Bastard that, in his mind, he met her there. Apparently, that was the time he developed deep psychosis, although Vicka still insists that they still kissed while flying above Deeptown and that his advanced diver powers disappeared shortly after Jinx left. Leonid returns to Chingiz's virtual apartment to find Maniac, Dick, and Mage (reclusive hacker who used to work for Vicka) already there. They go to the "Labyrinth" lobby and find themselves in the new version of the game. The original "Labyrinth" was an evolved version of Doom, which had players fighting a resistance battle against an alien invasion. The new "Labyrinth" is a sequel — after defeating the invaders, the humans send a retaliation force to the alien homeworld. The tougher (and smarter) enemies make the "lone wolf" tactics impossible. Leonid's team makes it through several levels before encountering a woman named Nike, who joins the team and turns out to be pretty good. At one point, Leonid even confesses that he is attracted to her. Realizing that it would take too long to reach the last level, Leonid confronts Maniac and asks him if he brought the Warlock virus with him. The reluctant Maniac reveals that he managed to smuggle parts of his new-and-improved "Warlock 9300" virus. He assembles the virus, and it turns into an elevator.

Crazy Tosser is reluctant to enter the elevator, as he believes they will be traced and kicked out but does so anyway. The elevator takes them to a high-rise on the last level of the "Labyrinth", where they manage to surprise several monsters. Tosser finally reveals that, earlier that day, he sent an email to his superiors informing them of a security drill — an attempt to smuggle a virus into the game. He even offers Maniac a $500 reward for "assisting" in testing the company's security. Since there is no obvious way to get down from the roof of the building, they make a hole in it and decide to climb down the girders on the inside of the building. Tosser offers to climb down first to make sure it's safe. Leonid takes one of his team-mates on his shoulders and proceeds next (using his diver ability to exit the deep while he is climbing down). Eventually, everybody got down, although Chingiz almost fell along with the person he was carrying. Nike (with Pat on her shoulders) managed to get down without a problem, which made Leonid suspicious. After several more challenges, they managed to reach the Emperor's castle. According to Tosser, the Temple entrance is located behind the Emperor's throne. The creature itself is a giant human with energy beams coming out of his eyes. Apparently, the Emperor is a prototype program that learns on its enemies' mistakes.

The Emperor proves a tough enemy, and the rest of the team stay behind to hold him off to allow Leonid, Pat, and Nike to reach the throne room. As Leonid blasts the throne to reveal the entrance, the Emperor enters and grabs Pat. Leonid is shocked, when the Emperor looks at him and asks, "Who am I?", before being blasted by Nike's rocket launcher, along with Pat. Leonid then confronts her and accuses her of being a diver. They both aim weapons at each other, but only Leonid fires. He then enters the door and finds himself facing a nightmare he kept seeing in his sleep for months — a chasm with two walls (fire and ice) and a string crossing it. Every time he tried to cross the chasm before, he would always fall and wake up. This time, he simply jumps down and floats towards an entrance he sees hovering in nothingness. The Temple then appears on the edge of Deeptown, showing that Leonid passed the test. As the Temple now has a Deeptown address, Leonid contacts his former colleague and tells him where to go to find the building. While he's waiting for the letter, a vehicle stops outside the Temple, and Man with no Face (AKA Dmitry Dibenko) gets out. He enters the Temple with Leonid's help (apparently, only divers may enter without assistance), and explains that Roma's death was an accident — the person who shot him was unaware of the weapon's lethality. He also says that he has been hiding from the Dark Diver for a long time.

Apparently, the Dark Diver wants him dead. Man with no Face does not reveal what is in the stolen files. Instead, he gives the prototype weapon to Leonid, saying that most of the bullets are stun rounds and the last one is deadly. He leaves, after which Leonid's team-mates arrive, followed by the deliveryman. Leonid takes the letter, opens it, and reads it. The files describe an attempt by Man with no Face to create "shadow consciousness" — a sort-of echo of a person who logs off from Deeptown. Apparently, there was some success in allowing an avatar to exist and interact with Deeptown for a period of time after the user leaves. The ramifications of this discovery are staggering — should Dibenko succeed, Deeptown will soon be populated with "ghosts" of real-life people. There will be no knowing who is real and who is not. Also, those "ghosts" will eventually achieve a form of AI, as evident by the Emperor in the "Labyrinth of Death" (his question "Who am I?" is the proof of his self-awareness). After locking the file on Chingiz's computer with four passwords (Leonid's, Chingiz's, Bastard's, and Pat's), they all leave the Temple and agree to meet up later in Chingiz's Deeptown apartment. Leonid logs off to find Vicka near her computer. He realizes that she was Nike and was helping them reach the last level.

He also sees that Vicka was not even trying to hide her identity from him (Victoria is a Roman name for the Greek goddess Nike). Despite Leonid's expectations, Vicka is not the Dark Diver. Now Leonid is in trouble — he told Nike he liked her before knowing that she was his wife. Vicka, however, does not mind, perhaps because Nike was a personification of her. At the agreed time, Leonid returns to Deeptown and goes to Chingiz's apartment. He also receives a message from Crazy Tosser, who is in the hospital from a heart attack (he is not a young man). Dick says he will be fine but is unable to help Leonid in the near future. Leonid goes to the apartment to find only Chingiz and Bastard waiting for him (Pat is doing homework in the real world). While they are deciding on what to do with the files (Chingiz suggests physically destroying the hard-drive, just to be sure), the Dark Diver reappears and paralyzes the three with stun rounds. He then forces them to call Pat and tell him to unlock the files and send them to the virtual apartment.

Pat, while sending the file, suspects something is wrong and enters the apartment armed. The Dark Diver, however, is quicker and shoots Pat. Too late does he realize that the bullet is lethal. He disappears with the file, as Pat's heart stops beating. Chingiz's virtual computer is too far away, so Leonid takes drastic measures. Somehow, he forces Chingiz to see the deep for what it really is (i.e. become a diver) and log off. Bastard rushes to his own virtual computer to log off, and Leonid leave the apartment and goes to his favorite bar/restaurant in Deeptown. There, he calls the Dark Diver, and the figure appears by him. Leonid finally knows the Dark Diver's true nature — he is an echo of Leonid and the power he once held. Apparently, after Jinx left, Leonid decided that he did not wish to be a diver anymore. So, subconsciously, he altered the deep-program to have a built-in timer and removed diver ability to see programming holes. The part of him that had the power to manipulate any program and access Deeptown without a computer split off and formed its own personality, while still remaining a distant part of him. That is why the Dark Diver did not know about the lethal round in his gun — it was Leonid's gun.

Deep Diver's life is a curse — he is unable to perceive Deeptown the way human do. All he sees are rough shapes and colors. He is also alone and was trying to steal Dibenko's files to create more like him. Leonid decides that it is time for him to embrace his destiny and the two merge. This restores all of Leonid's abilities, as well as abilities of other Divers. He contacts Chingiz and finds out that he managed to perform CPR in time to save Pat. Leonid then returns to the "Labyrinth" and frees the Emperor from his captivity in the game.

== Characters ==
=== Major characters ===
- Leonid/Gunslinger (Russian: Леонид) – former diver, who, at the end of the first novel, gained advanced abilities allowing him to enter Deeptown without the aid of technology and manipulate any program at will. Those abilities disappeared along with the divers' ability to "see" programming holes and back doors. Now he works as a furniture mover for a Deeptown delivery company. Leonid is suffering from deep psychosis, a condition he is trying to hide from his wife Vicka.
- Vicka (short for Victoria, Russian: Вика) – former diver. After losing most of her diver abilities, she gave up the deep and focused on real life. Shortly after the end of the first novel, she married Leonid and moved to Moscow with him, abandoning her psychological studies in Deeptown. Apparently, she is aware of Leonid's deep psychosis, but is unwilling to confront him about it.
- Chingiz (Russian: Чингиз) – hacker-turned-businessman. Former acquaintance of Maniac. Agrees to help Leonid discover the truth behind the stolen files.
- Bastard/Anton Stekov (Russian: Падла – Padla) – hacker, lives in Chingiz's apartment. Known to use jargon and swear profusely, which tends to annoy the more cultured Chingiz, especially in the company of Pat, of whom Chingiz is protective. Took on a hacking job for a mysterious figure and got a friend of his killed.

=== Minor characters ===
- Pat/Sasha (Russian: Пат) – teenage hacker, lives in Chingiz's apartment. Sees Chingiz as a father-figure. Constantly seeks to prove himself in the computer world.
- Roma/Grey Wolf (Russian: Рома) – former diver, teenager. After the diver community fell apart, he became an amateur hacker. Was shot and killed by a third-generation weapon while hacking a small company. Owner of one of the three keys to the Temple of Diver-in-the-Deep (his key was destroyed when Bastard reformatted his hardrive).
- Alexander/Maniac (Russian: Маньяк) – hacker. Divorced his third wife and moved to the US shortly after the end of the first novel. Good friend of Leonid's. Creator of the famous "Warlock 9000" virus. Later has created "Warlock 9300" – upgraded version of "Warlock 9000".
- Mage/Computer Mage/Zuko (Russian: Зуко) – computer expert. Formerly worked on creating security measures in Vicka's virtual brothel.
- Crazy Tosser/Dick/Richard Parker – former diver. Still works for "Labyrinth of Death" security, though he moved up in ranks. Owner of one of the three keys to Temple of Diver-in-the-Deep (His key was hidden in the final level of the newest version of Labyrinth of Death). His Deep exit trigger is the image of his neighbor girl's face.
- Dmitry Dibenko (Russian: Дмитрий Дибенко) – creator of the deep-program. Uses a prototype 886 processor, give him extremely high processing power and speed. For his accomplishments, he was given a special medal that gives him access to every Deeptown system, no matter how secure. His usual avatar has its face covered in mist.
- Dark Diver – mysterious figure, apparently able to use diver abilities unavailable to the rest. He hired Bastard to do the hacking job that got Roma killed.

== Publication history ==
Lukyanenko initially had no plans to continue the story from Labyrinth of Reflections but was asked to do so by readers of the first book. Lukyanenko didn't have a contract for second book and had to negotiate one with his publisher, who didn't believe the book would be a success. However, more than 100,000 copies were eventually printed. According to Lukyanenko, the 1998 first-person shooter computer game Unreal was important for the premise of the book. He has also stated that, as he finished the book, he did not plan to continue writing the series after False Mirrors.

== Reception ==
The novel was the runner-up awardee for at the Zvyozdnyy Most fantasy festival for best continued work. It was awarded the long form award at Interpresscon, and nominated in the "Bronze Snail" and "Sigma-F" awards. The book has been translated into Czech, Polish, Bulgarian and German.
