= Asiris Nuna =

Asiris Nuna (Russian: Азирис Нуна) is a 2006 Russian children's science fiction film directed by Oleg Kompasov and produced by Vladimir Khrapunov, Aleksei Kuznetsov and Sergey Chernyakov. The film is based on a Yuli Burkin and Sergei Lukyanenko novel Today, mom!, the first part of Island Rus trilogy, adapted by Ramil Farzutdinov and Oleg Kompasov. Music by Dmitri Funtikov.

== Plot ==
Once in the city Archaeological Museum brought the boulder, covered with half-erased ancient Egyptian hieroglyphics. The caretaker of the museum, to his surprise, finds a crack in a block, from which one can see a mysterious metallic object.

Two brothers Stas and Kostya, learn about the suspicious piece of rock, and in the night climb to the museum. They are within blocks of the strange metal capsule ovoid, get into it and totally awesome way to go on a journey through time. First, they get in 2506, where they become prisoners of Cosmic Prison, get acquainted with unusual people of the future, play an incredible game, fall into the clutches of the Sphinx fantastic Szydlow that saves them from the dangers lying in wait.

Brothers continue their journey in a time machine, which throws them this time in 16th century BC in Ancient Egypt. There they get acquainted with the bloodthirsty Pharaoh Nemenhotep, send them to a brutal punishment, where the brothers are on the verge of death. Once again, saved from the ancient Egyptians, Stas and Kostya again climb into the capsule hronoskafa and returned today to their parents. But they can only dream of peace - brothers waiting for battle with the mummy of Pharaoh Nemenhotepa suddenly revived in the familiar Archaeological Museum.

== Cast ==
- Filipp Avdeev as Kostik
- Roman Kirimov as Stas
- Maxim Averin as Shidla
- Vyacheslav Grishechkin as Keyseroll
- Semyon Furman as Kubatay
- Alyona Ivchenko as Ayna
- Aleksandr Filippenko as Pharaoh Nemenkhotep IV/Mummy
- Maria Kozakova as Hailine
- Nonna Grishayeva as Mother
- Aleksandr Lazarev Jr. as Father
- Spartak Mishulin as a watchman
