= Genome (disambiguation) =

Genome refers to a complex biochemical system devised within living organisms to ensure their ability to vigorously survive by reproduction, which is usually directed in coded fashion by DNA, the key molecule of that system.

Genome may also refer to:

- Human genome
- Bovine genome
- Mitochondrial genome
- BBC Genome Project, a digitised searchable database of programme listings from the Radio Times from the first issue in 1923, to 2009
- Genome (Ridley book), 1999 nonfiction book by Matt Ridley
- Genome (novel), science fiction novel by Sergey Lukyanenko
- Genome (journal), a scientific journal
- G-Nome, a PC game developed by 7th Level
- Genome, a superior humanoid race in Square's console role-playing game Final Fantasy IX
- Chromosome (genetic algorithm), the parameter set of a proposed solution to a problem posed to a genetic algorithm
- Lord Genome, a character from the anime series Tengen Toppa Gurren Lagann
- Wild Health Genomes, a professional baseball team that was based in Lexington, Kentucky

== See also ==
- Genome size
- Genome project
- Genomics
