= Final Draft (novel) =

2007 novel by Sergey Lukyanenko

- Author: Sergey Lukyanenko (Сергей Лукьяненко)
- Original title: Chistovik, Чистовик (Russian)
- Language: Russian
- Series: Draft
- Genre: Science fiction
- Publisher: AST (Russia)
- Publication date: 2007 (Russian edition)
- Publication place: Russia
- Media type: Print (Hardback)
- Pages: 352
- ISBN: 978-5-17-047315-1
- OCLC: 316009135
- Preceded by: Rough Draft [2005]

Final Draft (Russian: Чистовик, Chistovik) is a science fiction novel by Russian writer Sergey Lukyanenko, the sequel to Rough Draft.

== Plot summary ==
The story of the novel begins several hours after the end of Rough Draft, after Kirill Maximov, a regular man who was turned into a functional, escapes from Arkan (or Earth 1), fights his friend and curator of the world (Earth 2 or Demos) Kotya, and kills his midwife-functional Natalia Ivanova.

It turns out that the life of an ex-functional after abandoning his function is not safe at all. Especially for a special functional like Kirill.

Kirill takes a train to Kharkiv to find his Nirvana (Earth 22) "neighbor" Vasilisa, another customs officer-functional. However, the train is intercepted in Oryol by Arkan's security forces. Kirill is able to escape them and make it to Kharkiv by hitchhiking. Unfortunately, the Arkanians are somehow able to track him, so Vasilisa convinces Kirill to attempt a desperate move — a twenty-kilometer trek through the lifeless frozen world of Janus (Earth 14) during a snowstorm.

Barely making it to another tower, that of the customs officer-functional Martha, Kirill gets to the Polish city of Elbląg. He is caught by three police officers-functionals, but he is rescued by his friend Kotya, who opens a portal to his Tibetan residence (or rather, the residence of the current curator). Kirill, Kotya, and Kotya's girlfriend Illan (an ex-functional from Veroz, Earth 3) come up with a plan for freeing the Earth from Arkan influence, although Kirill begins to suspect that Arkan may not be the true puppet master behind the functionals.

To that end, Kirill travels to a technologically backward religious world of Tverd (Earth 6), the people of which managed to eliminate functional influence in their world's affairs through the use of highly advanced biotechnology. However, the Arkanians find him even there and attack this world, even though Tverd is ready to repel such an assault with their all-female Swiss Guards, killer Yorkshire Terriers, and flying gargoyles. Kirill kills the attacking agents but is forced to escape Tverd using his newfound curator abilities.

He finds himself in a world which he believes to be the functional homeworld (Earth 16), most of which is covered by a radioactive wasteland. The only habitable island features a strange-looking skyscraper at its mountain peak, obviously of functional design, as only some people are able to see it. However, upon reaching it, Kirill discovers that the structure is not the functional headquarters but merely their museum, protected by a functional who looks like an angel.

After fighting and defeating the angel, Kirill begins to understand the truth behind all worlds influenced by the functionals, most of it has to do with quantum physics. He returns to Elbląg, where a mailman-functional delivers him a letter from Kotya, whose abilities are disappearing, in which he formally challenges Kirill to a duel. The victor (and survivor) would become the next curator.

Kirill returns to Moscow and arrives to the location chosen for the duel and defeats Kotya. However, instead of finishing him off, Kirill makes a decision to stop being a functional and return to his previous life, knowing that, due to his special nature, the functionals will not risk trying to kill him.

== Analysis ==
Dmitry Bykov, writing for the magazine Ogoniok, wrote that the ending - where Kirill rejects the potential of the functionals to live an ordinary life - reflects a greater trend in Russian fantasy and Russian life, where greater possibilities are rejected in favor of a calm and ordinary life.
