= Time Spiral (disambiguation) =

Time Spiral is a block of card expansions for the trading card game Magic: The Gathering.

Time Spiral may also refer to:

- La Spirale du temps (English: The Time Spiral), eleventh book of Yoko Tsuno comic book series
- Time Spiral, short story by Sergey Lukyanenko as part of the Nuclear Dream story collection

== See also ==
- Live in an American Time Spiral, a 1982 album by George Russell
