= A Lord from Planet Earth =

Book trilogy by Sergej Loekjanenko

Trilogy first edition

A Lord from Planet Earth (Russian: Лорд с планеты Земля) is a trilogy of science-fiction novels by Russian writer Sergey Lukyanenko. Although predominantly science-fiction, the novels also include some elements of the fantasy genre. They are only available in Russian.

The trilogy consists of:

- A Princess Is Worth Death (Russian: Принцесса стоит смерти)
- The Planet which Doesn't Exist (Russian: Планета, которой нет)
- Glass Sea (Russian: Стеклянное море)

The initial draft of the first novel was written as a fantasy novel. However, Lukyanenko, then decided that the science-fiction version was better. The fantasy draft was subsequently lost.
