= Dances on the Snow =

2001 novel by Sergei Lukyanenko

- First edition (Russian)
- Author: Sergei Lukyanenko (Сергей Лукьяненко)
- Original title: Tantsy na snegu, Танцы на снегу (Russian)
- Language: Russian
- Series: Genome
- Genre: Space Opera, Science fiction novel
- Publisher: AST (Russia)
- Publication date: 2001 (Russian edition)
- Publication place: Russia
- Media type: Print (Hardback)
- ISBN: 5-17-007792-0
- OCLC: 48492070
- LC Class: PG3483.U498 T36 2001
- Followed by: Genome [1999]

Dances on the Snow is a science fiction novel written by the Russian sci-fi and fantasy writer Sergey Lukyanenko. Despite the fact that the novel was written later, it is considered to be an indirect prequel to the novel Genome. It takes place in the same fictional universe as Genome, about one hundred years prior to the novel's time frame. Unlike Genome, Dances on the Snow hardly deals with the issue of genetic engineering but does touch on the issue of cloning. However, the biggest focus is the problems of free choice and mind control.

== Plot ==
Tikkirey "Tiki" Frost lives on the planet Quarry, poorly adapted for human life and stricken with poverty. Due to the planet's high radioactivity, the inhabitants of Quarry are forced to live in a protective dome and pay for food and air, or "social support". Unemployment is a major problem on Quarry. In fact, one's ability to obtain a job depends on the quality of his or her neuroshunt implant, allowing direct mind-to-machine connection. Tikkirey's parents' neuroshunts have become obsolete and they have no money for an upgrade. His father has been unemployed for years, and his mother makes a pittance. Incapable of paying for their social support, Tikkirey's parents are forced to invoke their "constitutional right to commit suicide." For that, Tikkirey's social support is extended by 7 years, during which he can get education and find a job, as his neuroshunt is above the local standard. If his parents forgo their "constitutional right", the entire family will be evicted from the Dome. The life expectancy outside the Dome is 1–2 years.

After losing his parents, Tikkirey decides to leave Quarry by any means necessary. As such, he signs up on an interstellar ore transport as a "calculation module" — a wetware computer used for complex calculations at faster-than-light speeds, as normal computers fail to work. A calculation module remains in suspended animation, most of the time, while a stream of data is shunted through his brain. While this is a highly paid position, continuous misuse of the brain atrophies the frontal lobe, causing the person to lose his free will. After the expiration of the standard five-year contract, 97% of calculation modules are incapable of making their own decisions and continue flying for the rest of their lives. The other 3% manage to muster enough willpower to leave the ship (2%) or cancel the contract before time is up (1%); however, even they have to spend years relearning to make even the simplest decisions (e.g. a simple choice of soft drink is an extremely difficult process for them).

After regaining consciousness on the beautiful and wealthy planet of New Kuwait, Tikkirey demands to cancel his contract and leave the ship. He immediately finds out that a clause in the contract prevents him from doing just that, as he must pay off his 150,000 credit insurance policy, which will require Tikkirey to serve another 1.5 years on the ship. The contract is specifically written to prevent calculation modules from using ships as free rides. Fortunately, Tikkirey finds out that the crew took pity on the boy and broke the law by not getting him an insurance policy. He receives his earned credits and leaves the ship. He then takes a taxi and gets a room at a cheap hotel. He then hits another snag: his money will only last him about a week. New Kuwait's laws require local permanent residency for employment, but the process of obtaining it takes at least six months.

At the hotel, Tikkirey meets Lion, a boy his age, who was born and grew up on a space station. The next day, Tikkirey encounters and befriends a mysterious man named Captain Stas, who turns out to be a phage from the planet Avalon. Phages are knight-like members of an organization whose goal is to rid the Empire of its enemies. Unlike the rational humans around them, phages are encouraged to listen with their hearts. A phage is genetically engineered to be stronger and faster than any normal human. He is capable of using something called an "imperative voice", causing most humans to follow his instructions without question (similar to the Voice from Frank Herbert's novel Dune). A phage's weapon of choice is a multi-functional semi-intelligent plasma whip, chosen not for its deadliness but for its psychological effect. The phages' mission, abilities, and moral code have earned them the nickname "jedi", which they tend to dislike, as it trivializes the phages' purpose.

Stas is on a mission to investigate the suspicious activity on New Kuwait of agents from the planet Iney ("frost" in Russian). Iney has already "peacefully" allied with several other Imperial worlds and is gaining in strength, threatening the stability of the Empire. Before Stas or Tikkirey can do anything, most of the population of New Kuwait suddenly falls asleep. Tikkirey and Stas are one of the few still awake. Stas takes the boy and, at Tikkirey's request, the unconscious Lion with him on his ship. They are able to launch before the population awakes and announces its allegiance with Iney. With some quick thinking, Tikkirey connects Lion's brain to the datastream of the ship, temporarily turning him into a calculation module. The plan works, and Lion awakes shortly after. However, his free will is gone. Stas takes the boys to his home planet of Avalon, where the phages' headquarters are located. Tikkirey is hired by the phages to work in support role, while he takes care of Lion. Basically, Tikkirey is forced to tell Lion to do almost everything, hoping that he may one day get better. He also makes friends with his neighbors, a brother and a sister of a slightly younger age. One day, Tikkirey is asked by his supervisor to destroy a faulty plasma whip, which refuses to bond with any phage. To Tikkirey's surprise, the whip bonds to him, and he refuses to destroy the semi-living device. That same day, his neighbors invite him and Lion to go camping at a nearby lake. Since it is wintertime in that part of Avalon, the lake is frozen over. The teenagers (except for Lion) begin to ice skate, but ice cracks under Tikkirey, and he falls into the water. He attempts to get out by using the whip but to no avail. Surprisingly, Lion snaps out of his daze and saves Tikkirey. Stas arrives with paramedics and explains that the whip was a test of loyalty, which Tikkirey has failed. Tikkirey shows that the whip bonded to him, which surprises the phage, as this has never happened before. Tikkirey and Lion are taken to the phage headquarters, where Lion is given a clean bill of health by a psychiatrist. Lion explains that, during the time he was asleep, he has lived an entire lifetime as a citizen of Iney. The boys find out that the phages are planning on sending them back to New Kuwait to conduct an investigation as to how Iney is controlling the population.

Tikkirey and Lion are dropped in a pod made of a special form of ice, which melts on landing, leaving no trace. However, the boys are quickly captured by a team of girls armed with crossbows. They are escorted to their base camp, where Tikkirey encounters a disabled old man he met while escaping from New Kuwait. The girls are members of a former hip hop dancing troupe who have become guerrilla fighters. They help the boys sneak into the city, where Lion is reunited with his family, who all behave like a stereotypical perfect TV family. Tikkirey and Lion are sent to a boarding school "to learn to serve the society better." Everything appears to be going well, except that the boys know they are under surveillance. One night, the old man's daughter Natasha sneaks into their room and informs them that Iney counter-intelligence is following their every move. They decide to escape and hide in a school located in a poor district. They are able, for a time, to remain undetected by the Iney. Once, however, Natasha introduces Tikkirey to another girl, who claims to also be an agent for the phages. She informs Tikkirey that a wealthy Imperial industrialist has arrived on New Kuwait and that he is secretly working with Iney against the Empire. The girl orders Tikkirey to execute the industrialist and his teenage daughter. While morally disagreeing with the girl, Tikkirey decides to go through with it. Tikkirey, Lion, and Natasha sneak into the villa where the industrialist is being treated as an honored guest. However, upon attempting to ambush the man and his daughter, Tikkirey is surprised to learn that the industrialist is, in fact, Stas in disguise. His "daughter" is a young phage-in-training dressed as a girl. The real industrialist has been detained by the Imperial forces, and the phages have been sent in their stead. Stas immediately realizes that the girl who gave the execution order is an Iney agent, which means that their cover is blown. He decides to attempt to smuggle Tikkirey, Lion, and Natasha from New Kuwait in suitcases. There is one problem, however — due to a quirk of nature, FTL travel is lethal to human females (the reasoning behind this is not explained, although it is mentioned that a Y-chromosome is necessary to survive an FTL jump). As such, Natasha must be placed into a cryogenic pod. Due to the shortage of space on the luxury transport, the dock workers decide to leave Tikkirey's suitcase in storage to be sent with the next ship. An old female dockworker decides to look inside and finds the boy. Instead of reporting him, however, the old lady feeds him and asks him to tell her what is happening. After hearing his story, Tikkirey asks her to contact Stas and tell him to freeze Natasha. When she comes back, the lady begins to explain certain unknown facts to Tikkirey. She explains that the president of Iney, a woman by the name of Inna Snow, is, in fact, a clone.

At one point in time, a genetic genius named Edward Garlitsky has decided to fundamentally alter humanity for the better. For this purpose, he cloned himself into a woman named Ada Snezhinskaya, but their views on the means of achieving the change were radically different: Edward wanted to act behind-the-scenes (according to the novel Genome, he became the father of specification), while Ada wanted to directly alter the current social and political structure of the Empire. For that purpose, Ada created thousands of clones of herself and of Edward and spread them throughout the Empire (at that time, it was common practice for parents to buy fetuses). The first names of the female clones were always four letters long with a double consonant in the middle, while the last name was in some way related to snow (e.g. Inna Snow, Anna Neige). Sooner or later, most of the clones were tracked down and offered to have the collective memory of the clones imprinted on them. Most agreed. They all began to set themselves up in certain key political positions. Eventually, Inna Snow discovered a way of using neuroshunts to slowly download a dormant program into people's brains. A certain signal would then trigger the program, which would allow the affected people to live out entire lifetimes in their heads. While each person's "dream life" was different, several constants remained the same: Inna Snow and Iney are good, the Empire and the Emperor are bad. The medium for implanting the program was chosen to be the many TV series produced on Iney and watched throughout the Empire. After hearing this, Tikkirey realizes that the old lady is Ada Snezhinskaya, who reveals that Tikkirey Frost is himself a clone of Edward Garlitsky.

Despite this realization, Tikkirey attempts to kill Ada with a whip, but he only wounds her and gets captured by Iney forces. Finding himself in a prison cell with Stas, the phage-in-training, Lion, Natasha, and her grandfather, Tikkirey questions Stas and finds out that Stas knew about him being a clone. The group is then taken to a factory to meet Ada and Inna, where, after a verbal joust, Stas reveals that the Empire has begun a massive invasion of all Iney-occupied worlds, using a modified version of Inna Snow's program to remove Iney's propaganda from the affected people's minds. In a last-ditch effort to save herself and her plan, Ada uses the imperative voice to order Tikkirey and Natasha to jump off the catwalk into a pool of strong solvent. Natasha's grandfather sacrifices himself to save his granddaughter and push both Ada and Inna off the catwalk. Stas uses his own imperative voice to override Ada's order and frees the teenagers.

With the threat of Iney gone and the clones in custody, Stas offers to take Tikkirey back to Avalon. However, Tikkirey first makes a stop at Quarry to get two of his friends off that rock. As a side note, he mentions that a genetic cure has been found to allow women to safely traverse FTL hyperchannels without the use of cryogenics.
