= Thirteenth City =

1990 novel by Sergej Loekjanenko

- Author: Sergey Lukyanenko
- Original title: Тринадцатый город
- Language: Russian
- Genre: science fiction
- Publisher: AST (Russian edition)
- Publication date: 1990 (Russian edition)
- Publication place: Russia
- Media type: Print (Hardback)

Thirteenth City (Russian: Тринадцатый город, Trinadtsatiy gorod) is a science fiction novella written by the popular Russian science fiction and fantasy writer Sergey Lukyanenko. First published in 1990, then in 1996. In 2007, the novella was republished as part of a collection of Lukyanenko's early short stories titled Quay for Yellow Ships.

== Plot ==
An astronaut from Earth named Dima (short for Dmitry) crash-lands on the fourth planet of the star LK 43. The indigenous people, whose physical appearance is almost indistinguishable from human, live in the so-called Cities, enclosed and self-sufficient habitats, providing their tenants with all life's necessities. The Cities are ruled by the ruthless and authoritarian Watchers. The official ideology of the Cities promotes absolute equality and replaceability. The official honorific is "Equal". All individual qualities are considered to be atavistic and must be mercilessly eliminated to the point that most redheads are forced to dye their hair. The most dangerous atavisms are crying, hate, love, and friendship. These are eradicated in early childhood. The inhabitants of the Cities live in dormitories, while children live and study in boarding schools and know nothing about their parents. Each person's place of residency is chosen by the Watchers and are often relocated to another City. The Watchers also choose each person's job. Reproductive couples are chosen by the computer. The same computer also chooses a person's menu (exchanging food is forbidden). At the age of 60, all citizens are killed. Those who are declared as incurable atavists or publicly promote ideologically incorrect views are publicly censured and are subjected to a mind-wipe procedure..

There are people who do not live in the Cities; they are called Outsiders. The Watchers make the Equals believe that all Outsiders are nothing more than bandits and villains. Even the word "outsider" is considered a profanity by the Equals. While the Outsiders are free from total control, they have their own problems. Long ago, there was a nuclear war on the planet, which turned most of the planetary surface into a scorching desert. Most of the survivors enclosed themselves in the Cities, while the rest chose to stay free. The Outsiders are unable to provide themselves with even the most basic necessities, so they are forced to steal from the City stores. Dima finds out all this after meeting two Outsiders and a kidnapped Equal. He agrees to aid a group of Outsiders in infiltrating a nearby City to free all Equals from the totalitarian Watchers. As Earth technology is much more advanced than local technology, this plan has a chance to succeed. Dima kills three Watchers but is himself captured. He finds out that most Watchers live in the beautiful and idyllic Thirteenth City, which consists of houses in the only forest left on the planet. The existence of Thirteenth City is covered up, so that neither the Equals nor the Outsiders are aware of it.

After getting to Thirteenth City, Dima discovers that the way of life in the Cities is the only viable one on the planet. Due to the nuclear war, there are very few habitable areas left. Besides the small forest, which fits only several thousand Watchers and the gully with a few hundred Outsiders, life is only possible in the Cities. Their population is in the millions, so overcrowding is inevitable. To avoid bloody conflicts and overall chaos, the Watchers are forced to combat love (to avoid jealousy), friendship (to avoid unions and political parties), and hate to create uniform goodwill among the Equals.

The Equals, like the Outsiders, are suffering from genetic mutations, caused by radiation. That is the reason why all sexual partners must be selected by the computer. The Outsiders, unwilling to subject themselves to rule, simply kill their children in infancy. The set lifespan of 60 is the result of extremely low supplies, even the Watchers are not exempt from this rule. Also, only those with high IQ are chosen to be Watchers, as they can grasp the severity of the situation and make the necessary decisions.

On behalf of Earth, Dima promises to help the people of this planet to remove the consequences of nuclear war. This will take years, but once it is done, the people will once again be able to live normal lives.
