= Nuclear Dream =

- Author: Sergey Lukyanenko
- Original title: "Атомный Сон" ("Atomnyi Son")
- Language: Russian
- Genre: sci-fi collection
- Publication date: 2002
- Publication place: Russia
- Media type: Print (hardback & paperback)
- ISBN: 5-17-012405-8
- OCLC: 50561698
- LC Class: PG3483.U498 A95 2002

Nuclear Dream is a collection of various works by Sergei Lukyanenko, published in 2002. Most of the short stories were previously published individually, either online on in various literary magazines. Along with other things, it includes the novel Nuclear Dream.

== Novels ==
- Transparent Stained-Glass Windows
- Nuclear Dream

== Short stories ==
=== From Fate ===
- Evening Conversation with Mister Special Ambassador
- From Fate
- Footsteps Behind Your Back
- Negotiators
- Ahaulya Lyalyapta

=== Time Spiral ===
- A Talk Between Men
- Time Spiral
- Professional
- Coincidence
- Very Important Cargo

== Miscellaneous Work ==
=== Articles ===
- World of Moving Pictures
- History of Illnesses or Games That Play People

=== Scripts ===
This section contains the initial draft of the scripts for the Night Watch film adaptation that were written during the period when the novel was supposed to be adapted into a made-for-TV mini-series.

=== Pranks ===
- Koblandy-batyr and Barsa-Kelmes - chronicles a prank the author and his friends pulled up in college and what happened when a legitimate magazine treated it as a real thing.
- Argentum Key
