= Spectrum (novel) =

2002 novel by Sergei Lukyanenko

- Author: Sergei Lukyanenko
- Original title: Spectr, Спектр (Russian)
- Language: Russian
- Genre: Science fiction
- Publisher: AST
- Publication date: 2002
- Publication place: Russia
- Media type: Print (Hardback)
- Pages: 490
- Awards: Kurd Laßwitz Award for Best Foreign Work (2008)
- ISBN: 5-17-014364-8
- OCLC: 51150595

Spectrum is a science fiction novel by Russian writer Sergei Lukyanenko, taking place in the near future. Contact with aliens allowed humanity to travel between planets through portals. The Keymaster civilization not only provides new technologies to the world but also makes sure that their conditions are fulfilled to the letter: unrestricted access to the Gates for all who are willing. Payment for their use is an unusual story told to a Keymaster by the traveler. The main character of the novel is a private investigator who solves his clients' problems on other planets.

His main strength is his ability to make up the necessary stories needed to gain passage to alien worlds. This earned him the nickname "the Walker" from those who know of him.

== Plot summary ==
His life changes when a wealthy man walks into his office and asks him to find his missing daughter. After a short investigation, the Walker finds her on Library - a world full of ancient ruins. Before he can bring her back, however, she dies in a freak accident. A clue leads him to another alien planet where he finds her alive and well. Soon he discovers that the same woman exists on several other worlds, each is connected to the other. One by one, they are killed in seemingly random, totally unrelated events. It is to the Walker's great surprise when he finds himself becoming attracted to his client's daughter. It's a race against time, as the Walker desperately tries to save the identical copies of the woman, only to have them die in his arms. Can he save the last one before she perishes and, in the process, uncover a massive conspiracy going back thousands of years with the Keymasters in the middle?

== Features ==
Each of the 7 parts of the novel starts with a word of the Russian mnemonic (see Roy G. Biv) which helps to remember the spectrum colors: "Kazhdy Okhotnik Zhalaet Znatj Gde Sidit Fazan" (Every hunter wants to know where a pheasant sits; K - Krasny, red; O - oranzevy, orange; Zh - zholty, yellow; Z - zelyony, green; G - goluboy, blue; S - siniy, indigo; F - fioletovy, violet). Each part includes something on food, cooking and gourmet ideas. Each planet has something of the corresponding color (e.g., the Preria features orange sky and the first human met by the Walker, is a red, even orange-covered kid). In the Orange part, there appears a "cowboy" whose name is not revealed but it's hidden in the paragraph describing him; by reading only capital letters you get the name "Semetskiy" (for several years, Russian and Ukraininan SF writers included a character of this name who had to be killed in this or that way. The real Semetskiy is a well known Russian SF fan, works in book selling business and a good friend of Sergey Lukianenko and many other writers.)

== Planets ==
The main character visits 7 alien planets (8, including the Keymasters' homeworld) throughout the novel, one in each chapter.

=== Library ===
This planet is not a home to any native race. The entire world is made up of many rocky islands, separated by thin canals. Each of those islands features from one to several hundred stone obelisks. There is a letter written on each obelisk. Library is home to about a thousand sentients, 300 of them being human. Most of these are scientists, engaged in futile attempts to decipher the alien writings on the obelisks. Many of these are unable to return home, as they lack storytelling skills. The only forms of native life are three species of algae and nine species of marine animals, living in canals. All of these are inedible and non-aggressive.

=== Prairie II ===
This planet was colonized by the United States and appears to be an idealized version of the American Old West. It is populated by over 20,000 colonists. However, it is also home to a native race of sentient humanoids (called Indians by the colonists), who live in a primitive agrarian society.

=== Arank ===
Homeworld of the humanoid Aranks, who are physically indistinguishable from humans. The Aranks possess highly advanced technology, second only to the Keymasters, and centuries ahead of Earth. Most of their needs are satisfied freely. The Aranks are a wise and good-natured race. They possess a unique trait — they do not understand the concept of the meaning of life. Other concepts such as religion, soul, and God are all foreign to them. In fact, they privately consider the other races' obsession with these concepts to be ridiculous. Despite this, the Aranks are still an emotional and friendly people. Their laws forbid them from giving technology to races that are not sufficiently advanced to properly use it, with one exception. By Arank law, attempted murderers lose all their property to their would-be victims, including their spouses (the victim has the right to refuse). This supersedes the technology non-proliferation law.

=== Marge ===
This world is populated by a race of marsupial hermaphrodites called the Dio-Dao. Their lifespan is extremely short by most races' standards — only six months. However, the parents are able to pass on half of their memories to their children. The parent dies immediately after giving birth. Those who have failed to get pregnant live slightly longer (no more than a month). Despite their short lives, the Dio-Dao adore bureaucracy. The Valley of God is an area on Marge devoted to all religious cults of the galaxy with most of the followers and priests being Dio-Dao. The planet's true name is Fakyu; "Marge" (vernacular for "Planet") is an American name (for obvious reasons).

=== Bezzar ===
A unique planet, completely covered by a thin layer of water with extremely high surface tension, allowing anyone to walk on it as if on land. The planet is populated by the Bezzarians, who are sentient 6.5-foot amoebae, the only known sentient single-celled organisms in the galaxy. The Bezzarians are quite advanced in the fields of biotechnology and space travel (their ships don't physically move through space; they simply shift their spatial coordinates). They also have a very low temperature tolerance. Humans can only survive on Bezzar for no more than twenty-four hours due to the planet's unique properties.

=== Shealy ===
Home to the Shealy, a race of sentient flightless birds, who have learned to completely suppress their minds after reaching adulthood. All adult Shealy act only in accordance with their reflexes, gained during childhood.

=== Talisman ===
This uninhabited planet is covered by a 600-foot layer of fog, which converts solar radiation into electricity, which is then transferred to the ground. This energy powers the constant synthesis and destruction of matter in small artificial chambers known as safes. These safes are usually staked out by prospectors from all over the galaxy, hoping to find something of value during the usual cycle of matter synthesis; however, the cases of someone getting rich because of this are quite rare.
