= The Stars Are Cold Toys =

Russian 1997 edition

The Stars Are Cold Toys and Star Shadow are two 1997 books of a space opera series by Russian science fiction writer Sergey Lukianenko. It is a first-person narration, told by a pilot Pyotr Khrumov, who attempts to prevent destruction of the planet.

While the story begins as hard science fiction describing Pyotr's flight to home on shuttle Spiral, later the emphasis drifts from technical details. The books are known for bright worlds of Geometers (a cynical deconstruction of the world of Upbringing and the famous Noon Universe of Strugatsky brothers) and Shadow (a world of utter individualism, in which every person is treated according with an often unpleasant reality of one's subconsciousness).

== Prehistory ==
In the beginning of the 21st century a group of scientists from MSU invented a jumper, a device allowing FTL travel. But distance of every jump is a constant — about 12.3 light years, so travelling requires high navigation skills and a good dose of luck. Additionally, all power is drained from active devices during a jump, and all active data carriers are wiped. Soon after, the scientists are hired by NASA and begin working on the prototype, converting a space shuttle into a jump-capable ship. During one of the first interstellar flights, the shuttle Enterprise encountered and was captured by an alien race...

So the Humankind joined a conglomerate of non-humanoid races, known as the Conclave. It is an utterly rational organization, and this may be seen as cruel. Races are divided into the Strong and the Weak — the Strong are ancient powerful civilizations and the real rulers of the Conclave. While the younger Weak races with restricted rights may overcome the Strong ones in some areas — so, Human starships with outdated engines are the fastest (species of other races are killed or driven mad during jumping, while for Humans it's pure ecstasy that rivals sex or drugs), military fleets of mouse-shaped race Alary are the most powerful, chameleon-shaped Counters perform calculations better than any computer, etc. — nevertheless, narrow specialization is a characteristic feature of Weak races — and the reason why the Conclave needs and uses them, while civilizations of no value are simply exterminated. This even applies to races that are of no threat to the Conclave.

Of course, there are Weak races malcontent with the status-quo — Humans, Alary, Counters, and Kualkua (symbiotic shapeshifters who can biologically merge with most other races). All are trapped in frames of their specializations — without any way out, as the political situation is stable.

Suddenly, things change.

== Plot summary ==
During a usual trading flight Pyotr found a Counter on his craft who called himself Karel and, most importantly, made it through the jump unhurt (ironically, the alien accomplished this by going into a self-induced coma caused by division by zero). Standing orders require Pyotr to destroy the ship and all evidence of the alien's survival, as this would eliminate the Conclave's need in Humanity. The alien requested an informal meeting with Andrey Khrumov — Pyotr's grandfather, a known political scientist, a Russian patriot/nationalist and a great patriot of Humanity, biased against the Strong races.

A fleet of Alary has captured a small but extremely powerful scout spaceboat of an unknown civilization, which heavy damaged the Alary spaceships during the fight. Its pilot was killed, but without a doubt it was a human being. Studying the memory of the scout showed that another civilization had transferred its planetary system to a region of space close by, perhaps escaping a cataclysm. Strangely enough, they shaped their continents to resemble a perfect circle and square — so Andrey Khrumov called them Geometers.

The new civilization seems to be strong enough to take on the entire Conclave, as the single scout ship managed to wipe out two-thirds of one of the strongest Alary fleets before being tractored into the Alary flagship. This is a chance for Weak races to improve their positions... but also a threat for Earth, since the Strong races, if becoming aware of the Geometers, would destroy the humans to prevent its possible alliance with a biologically-identical race, stronger than the Strong races.

A conspiracy of four races decide to carry out a reconnaissance mission. Pyotr Khrumov agrees to enter a symbiosis with a Kualkua, who morphs him to appear as the dead pilot, gives him the language of Geometers, and temporarily erases his memory...

== Societies ==
By struggling to find allies Pyotr will explore two worlds: the home planet of Geometers and the world of Star Shadow in the core of our Galaxy.

=== Conclave ===
A rational conglomerate of sentient races in our part of the galaxy. Long ago, the races of the Conclave were subdivided into the Strong and the Weak.

==== Known Strong Races ====
- Hiksi (or Hiksoids) are a race of mantis-like aliens. They are very tall by human standards (3 meters or 9'10") but fragile, indicating a low-gravity homeworld. A Hiksi can trip and easily break an appendage. They do, however, enjoy a much better eyesight than humans. The location of their eponymous homeworld is unknown. They have numerous colonies, including planets in the Sirius system. The Hiksi are a caste-based society, depending on which task an individual is more suited for, with the castes differentiated by skin pigmentation. When a new generation of Hiksi is ready to take over, the oldest generation commits a mass ritualistic suicide. Despite this custom, they are not that different from humans psychologically. For example, they have analogs to television, advertisements, circus, etc. Along with the Daenlo, the Hiksi are responsible for humanity.
- Daenlo appear as large rhinoceroses with tentacles on their faces. They have a powerful fleet. Responsible for humanity.
- Torpp are a unique race of non-biological organisms. They appear as small stars and appear to be composed of plasma encased in force fields. Their homeworld is a star. They are able to travel through space without ships.
- Jen'sh a race of engineers that appear as a cross between a bee and a monkey. It was previously thought that the Jen'sh were a Weak race.

==== Known Weak Races ====
- Humanity has joined the Conclave in the 2020s. There have not been measurable technological advances in that time. The exceptions are the jumper, holographic image projectors, and thermobaric weapons capable of destroying an aircraft carrier with one hit. Most governments have their own space programs. Nearly 20% of Earth population works is in some way working in a space-related industry. Certain facts are known from the books: Moscow is no longer the capital of Russia after a military junta has taken over the government; there have been armed conflicts in the Caucasus for nearly three decades; Russia and Ukraine fought over Crimea, after which the peninsula was recognized as an independent state.
- Counters are a non-biological race of living computers. They are capable of quickly and precisely working out any mathematical problem. The Counters consider the word "counter" to be an insult, but have not revealed their own name for their race. Their homeworld is a ringed gas giant. The counters see their life's purpose as the discovery of the original truth. The Counters appear as average-sized, grey, scaly reptiles. Their blue eyes glow in the dark. They possess two independent levels of consciousness: internal (works with information in terms of bytes) and external (similar to other races' consciousness). The Counters are capable of interfacing with any living or non-living electrical impulse-based systems, from the human brain to any electronic device.
- Alary a rodent-like race whose specialty is military. They are capable of moving either upright or on all fours. Even though their forward appendages are prehensile, all their weapons are carried on their heads and are operated with the tongue. Alary are gender-neutral until reaching the age of maturity, at which point it selects a gender and changes its fur from black to grey.
- Kualkua is a symbiotic, shapeshifting race. It is capable of merging with any organic being and transform it as desired. Known for complete disregard for death. All Kualkua are actually a part of a single being, spread out over multiple "bodies." After the Kualkua defied the will of the Conclave, their home planet was destroyed. Since then, the Kualkua will not talk to members of the Strong races but will do their bidding.
- Dusties are a worm-like race whose function used to be mining resources for the Strong races. They developed a set of ideas known as "absolute knowledge" in order to become a Strong race. However, the Conclave merely assigned the Dusties a new function - terraforming.
- Flickerings are responsible for maintaining the communication channels throughout the conclave.
- Unpronounceables are in the process of developing a universal set of morals and philosophies for all known races in order to equalize the status.

=== Geometers ===
This world is almost dreamlike. Possessing control over energy, friendship with other sensible races, order and love to all alive...

Lukyanenko polemizes with Strugatsky's World of the Noon. The society of Geometers is crucially based on Upbringing. No families. People are brought up in groups of four by Mentors, who help them to socialize and suppress "wrong" sides of their characters (without any violence, just refusing love). Mentors also help them to recognize the occupation, which is required by the Motherland and which they would like — but Mentors are sure in their right to choose. Mentors don't hesitate to ruin "wrong" dreams of their pupils and have no respect for their personal life. The result is far from World of the Noon, but a society of utter expediency, of people who are brought up averagely — i.e. they fulfil all rules of the society, but are almost unable to violate any (such behaviour is even considered as illness).

The core of this world conflicts with what Pyotr considers right — "you can violate laws of the society, but can't violate principles of the moral", "to be right is always an ordeal". Later Lukianenko supposes that the world of Geometers isn't free and really happy, due to both the hostile outer world and the kind inner world of the family are necessary to form a personality.

Geometers can't be an ally for the Earth, only a new host — Pyotr understands it. A loose quote: "From point of view of inhabitants of the Motherland we are absolutely wrong. And we'll be oppressed — so quietly and insensibly that won't even notice that. Cosmodromes will empty, factories will stop — for instance, in order to rescue the wrecked ecology. Then Geometer will help us with their Mentors — the best in the world. For example, to introduce future generations to high knowledge. Will apply their bioengineering, beating our diseases and superfluous emotionality as well. What's the need of fire of emotions for those who strives for Friendship? One may even kill without fury and rage. A couple of generations will pass, by the way, as the Conclave wanted. And the Earth will become the new Motherland for those, who will be unable to understand this word really."

Geometers' culture is a direct result of their history. Apparently, there were two intelligent lifeforms on the planet: the Geometers and those they called the Furry Ones (humanoids with fur covering their bodies). The Furry Ones were the more aggressive species and waged war on the Geometers. To fight them off, a Geometer doctor created a disease that completely wiped out the Furry Ones. The genocide horrified the Geometers, and they vowed to make any other race they encounter their friend (whether they want to or not). Some time later, a plague struck the Geometers but was cured when a doctor working with molds discovered antibiotics. The death toll was high, and the Geometer society was in disarray, allowing the Mentors to take full control and establish the "friend philosophy" as law. It has been suggested by some Geometer historians that the plague was engineered by the same doctor who stopped it at the behest of the Mentors, who were planning to use the disorder to take over. Such historians are silenced and placed in sanatoriums (i.e. prisons). Once space travel was discovered, the Geometers found two other intelligent species (non-humanoids this time) in their system. These were the first races on which their regression-progression methods were used and used successfully.

Geometers are highly advanced technologically. In some respects, they rival even the Conclave. Their advances are also dangerous to some Weak races, threatening their status within the Conclave. The powerful Alari fleets are nearly useless against the Geometer "unarmed" scoutships. Geometer A.I. technology would allow the Conclave to replace the Counters with much more obedient A.I.'s. Human monopoly on fast travel will end once the Conclave finds out that the Geometers use a combination of subspace drives and jumpers to rapidly travel vast interstellar distances without any ill (or ecstatic) effects.

=== Shadow ===
It's probably the most ancient world, settled mostly by beings biologically identical to Humans — but it includes non-humanoid races as well, as respected minorities.

Each planet of the Shadow is spotted by the grid of Gates — every person feels them; if you step into one, it will instantly transport you to the planet, satisfying your subconscious feelings the best. If you want a battle it will send you to a planet in war; if you want to study, a planet-university waits for you... Shadow allows you the absolute freedom and all possibilities to evolve — there's even no death: if you'll die, you'll be resurrected at the planet you want. But this turns out to be a severe ordeal for a person, revealing the ultimate truth about oneself.

Technical progress has stopped at some level — but this level is probably higher than everything known. But "those who want to go further" go. After several deaths you'll get bored to remain a human, and Gates will remake you into some advanced energy living form, but what that experience feels really like remains a complete mystery to those who are still linked to their terrene, human body.

All what's needed to save the Earth is to plant the Seed of the Gates — and Humans'll join the Shadow, escaping outer threats. But the Seed will grow only if a person sincerely wants it. Maybe the world of the Shadow is really good, but Pyotr and his friends can't like it — they were in too unpleasant worlds on their way across planets of the Shadow. "A man can't be allowed to have such a freedom. One can't leave decisions to be made by a handful of garbage on the bottom of the subconsciousness. We 've learned — long ago — to act not as we want but as it's needed, and found our real freedom in it. Even in the inanimous slavery of Geometers there are more gaps for real freedom, than in the Shadow, a world of absolute permissiveness. Because to act exactly as you want is the real slavery." — somewhat debatable thoughts of Pyotr.
