= Knights of Forty Islands =

1990 novel by Sergey Lukyanenko

- Cover
- Author: Sergey Lukyanenko
- Original title: "Рыцари Сорока Островов" ("Rytsary Soroka Ostrovov")
- Language: Russian
- Genre: Science fiction novel
- Publication date: 1990
- Publication place: Russia
- Media type: Print (Hardback & Paperback)
- ISBN: 5-17-022344-7

Knights of Forty Islands is a science fiction novel by Sergey Lukyanenko

== Plot introduction ==
Written from 1988 to 1990 in Alma-Ata, this tale, at the same time romantic and harsh, describes teenage children moved into an artificial alien-created environment and forced to fight each other for supremacy.

== Explanation of the novel's title ==
In the story, children, designated as "knights" must conquer all forty islands in the world so as to return home, thus the name.

== Plot summary ==
In the novel, Dima is a 14-year-old boy who used to fight on streets of his native city Alma-Ata. He now has to fight in a place where swords are used instead of fists.

The new environment consists of forty islands, each connected to three others via high and narrow bridges. There is a castle on each island; and about 15-18 kids ("knights") live in each one. The islands are distinct: dictatorship or democracy, a brutal rude leader or a kind one. The population is made up of approximately 70% boys and 30% girls in homogenous or heterogeneous national groups, no one older than 18. Everyone wants to return home, but to do so they are told they must conquer all 40 islands - then, the aliens promised, they would return the winners to their homes. There are also several rules of engagement, also set down by aliens.

Swords are wooden at first, but a sword turns steel when the wielder feels hatred and desire to kill towards the opponent. Although retaining the world of feelings of usual children, these "knights" change: they learn to fight to the death, not to pay much attention to wounds; they cover friends and take revenge for fallen ones. Dima sees his new friends being killed, and he kills, too.

The way of life at the islands is very stable, since the aliens take into account human psychology and sociology, even though they don't understand human feelings, relationships and motivation. Also, as it turns out, they had a long time, decades, of trial and error.

Dima and Inga, a girl he knew on Earth, propose the establishment of a Confederation of islands as the way to stop the Game, and get support among their peers. Some knights refuse to join the Confederation and are killed when they do not surrender to the conquerors. However, the Confederation, even realized, proves to be unstable and is doomed from the beginning: though most want to return home, some only want power for themselves... Also, this attempt was not the first: Dima and his friends discover a hidden room with remains of children who got on islands during the Second World War and locked themselves in, when their attempt of Union of Islands collapsed because of betrayal.

But the heroes also find old weapons in this room, including dynamite. Now the action rushes...

== Major themes ==
This novel contrasts with the books of Vladislav Krapivin, who emphasises the inherent goodness of children. Lukyanenko draws on a harsher city subculture and is closer to Golding's pessimistic outlook in Lord of the Flies, though his skepticism expresses on higher levels of social and inter-cultural interaction, than just descent to savagery.

The author's attitude towards the topic is expressed openly:

{...} Author believes, that in the childhood, when every courtyard is an island, and every street is a bridge to unbeknown, one day there will remain no place for the Game, in which they kill.

== Award received ==
- "Sword of Rumatha"
- Aelita award
