= Yuli Burkin =

Russian science fiction writer and musician

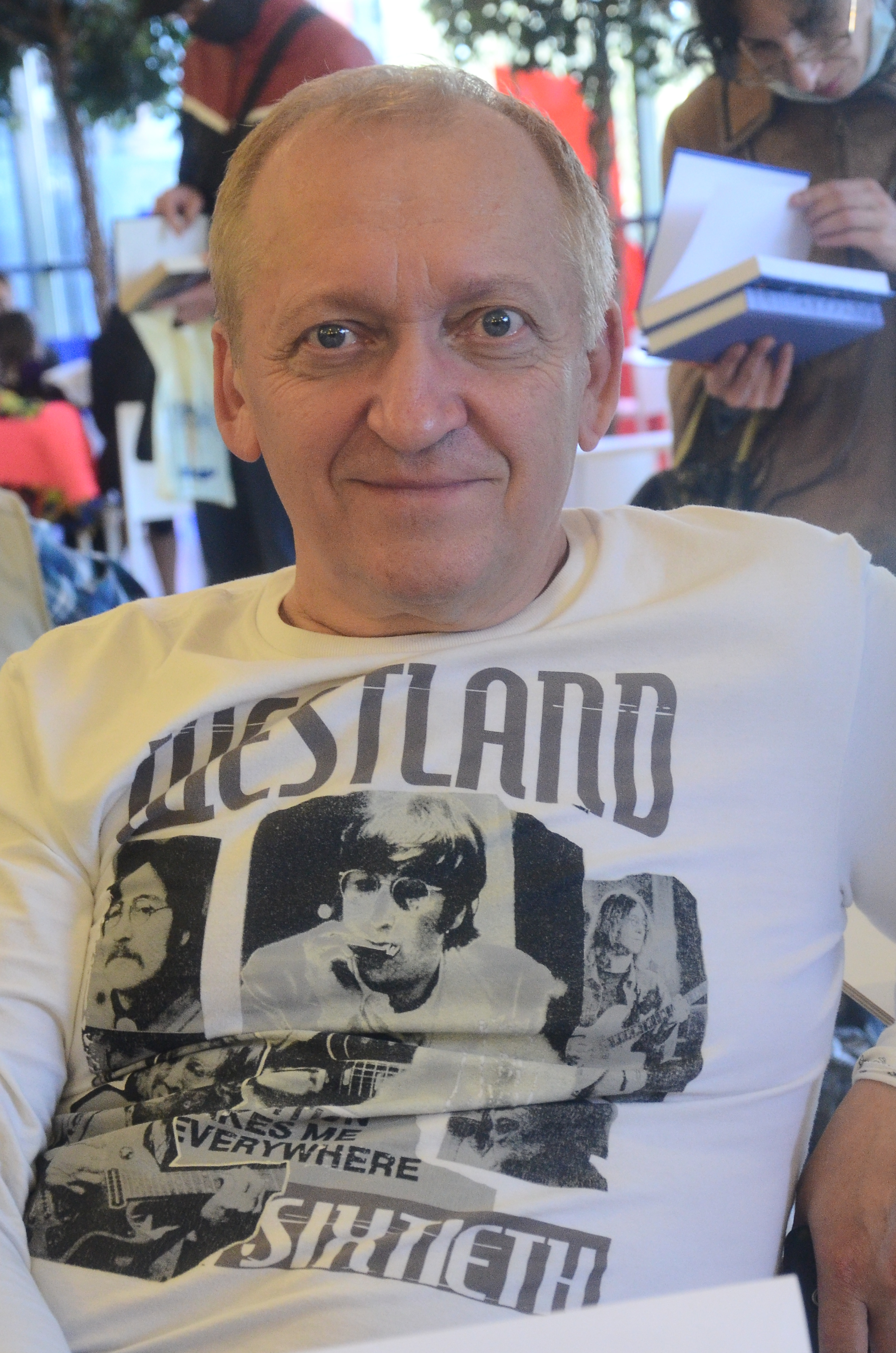
- Genre: science fiction

Yuliy Burkin (Russian: Юлий Серге́евич Буркин; born 1960, in Tomsk) is a Russian science fiction writer and musician. He has coauthored a trilogy Island Russia with Sergey Lukyanenko.

== Books ==
Original title	Transliterated title	English title	Genre	Written
Остров русь	Ostrov Russ	Island Russia	Children's fantasy	1992, Tomsk, Alma-Ata
