= Rough Draft (novel) =

2006 Russian edition

Written in 2005, Moscow, Rough Draft by Sergey Lukyanenko is a science fiction novel of the "parallel world" genre. It was followed by Final Draft.

== Plot introduction ==
Kirill, a Russian living in Moscow, one day discovers that he has the ability to go to other worlds parallel to Earth.

== Plot summary ==
The story starts with the hero, Kirill, being "erased" from daily life in present-day Moscow. Everybody forgets him (even his parents and dog), another person lives in his apartment, all IDs and files in all offices disappear. After a while he is phoned and invited to an old water tower — but inside is his future home and working place. There it is revealed to him that he is able to open doors, leading to other worlds — although at first all but one are locked. Once opened each door becomes rigidly connected to some world, but which one can't be predicted. All of the worlds have mostly similar environments and seem to be on the planet Earth but the societies and people are different.

After a while Kirill meets a special group of functionals, so called because they gained supernatural abilities making them excellent in some profession. They serve other people, but mostly other functionals. They say Kirill has become one of them — a customs officer. He benefits from taxes paid by people who pass through his tower. Also he has superhuman strength and is almost immortal, but only within 10 km of his tower.

Kirill enjoys these new worlds, people and abilities. A politician Dima meets him and asks to find a national idea for Russia. He informs Kirill about the world number One, which nobody can access and which seems to be exactly our world living 30 years later. Critical information from this world may enhance the prestige of the country.

Kirill also encounters an underground, that is, a few people fighting against the 'corporate laws' of functionals and their working for themselves or the elites of other worlds. He remains untouched by the rhetoric of the underground, justifying most of this. Ideas of armed opposition are alien if not to say ridiculous for him. However, a younger woman whom Kirill falls in love with is a genuine underground activist...

The last door opened leads to the world number One: A lovely Moscow filled with smiling people: there were no horrors of revolution and no World War II, as this world lags for 30 years and the rulers of it carefully study the mistakes of other worlds. It's just what Dima proposed to Kirill, but applied in reverse.

Upon rather bloody returning to our world, Kirill faces troubles with his girl. Hating the system of functionals, she manifests disobedience. But their laws don't forgive this, and the functional Natalie murders her, Kirill being unable to resurrect her...

"An extreme foolishness," said I, "All these loud words and beautiful poses... 'they will not pass', 'yet it moves', 'motherland or death', 'am able to die for my beliefs' — all of this becomes nonsense when real death comes... All of this is for kids. And for adults who handle them..."
Natalie nodded with approval.
"But yet it moves" said I, "Doesn't it? It moves, and they will not pass, and motherland remains motherland even if death becomes death, and nobody is ready to die, but sometimes it's easier to die than to betray..."

In Kirill's fighting Natalie, his tower becomes devastated, thus he ceases being a functional and is restored to his former life.

== Universes in Rough Draft ==
Rough Draft features a number of alternate universes. The precise number of them is unknown, with the later parts of the book suggesting that there may be many more universes than most Functionals are aware of. The only way to travel between these universes is through watchtowers, which exist in several universes at once (though the way they appear differs with each respective universe). The functionals refer to the universes by official numerical designations and more colloquial nicknames. Those nicknames are not always consistent - for example, functions and their allies tend to refer to Earth 3 by the name of a city-state that's closest to the watchtower they use to get there.

- Earth 1 (Arkan) - a universe 35 years "behind" Earth 2. It's a home universe of the functionals.
- Earth 2 (Demos) - Kirill's home universe. It's the most technologically advanced inhabited universe in the "Fan". Named so for its widespread use of democracy, which is considered to be an archaic form of government in other worlds.
- Earth 3 (Veroz) - a world where the humanity lives in numerous city-states scattered throughout the planet. Australia is an unexplored continent and the sea is filled with creatures that are regarded as legendary elsewhere (such as the Kraken). Oil doesn't exist on Earth 3, so steam is a primary power source among the natives.
- Earth 4 (Antik) - a world that, in many respects, evokes a Greco-Roman utopia. For example, slaves are allowed to rebel twice a year. If they succeed, they can become free citizens and have their own slaves.
- Earth 5 - a world where human beings mate in cycles, coming into heat during the spring. It's more advanced than Earth 3 but less advanced than Earth 2.
- Earth 6 (Tverd) - a world dominated by repressive theocracies. The dominant church practices a "warped, lethargic" version of Christianity. This world is known for comparatively advanced bio-technology and ignorance of electricity.
- Earth 14 (Janus) - a world with bitterly cold winters and hot summers. Spring is the only season when the weather is anywhere close to tolerable. This version of Earth has no moon and no magnetic field. Although most functionals assume Earth 14 is uninhabited, a functional Kirill encountered in Final Draft insisted that there was some animal and human life that survived by migrating along with the spring weather.
- Earth 16 - a world where Earth changed little over the course of billions of years. It's volcanically active, radioactive, oxygen-poor and generally inhospitable to living organisms, but it is stated in Final Draft that animal-like voices are sometimes heard from there.
- Earth 17 (Preserve) - a world completely devoid of human life. It's a popular resort among the Functionals and their allies.
- Earth 22 (Nirvana) - a universe with no native animal life. The planet's surface is covered with plants that produce a narcotic substance that puts any human being within proximity into a drugged stupor. Functionals use this universe as a political prison for their enemies. The children born in this universe are more resistant to the effects of the plants than their parents, but they aren't completely immune.

== Sources ==
- Чистовик-3 (in Russian)
