= Autumn Visits =

1997 novel by Sergej Loekjanenko

- Author: Sergey Lukyanenko
- Original title: Осенние Визиты (or Osennie Vizity)
- Language: Russian
- Genre: Science fiction
- Publisher: E-Book
- Publication date: 1995–1996 serial (1997 as book)
- Publication place: Kazakhstan
- Media type: Print (Paperback)
- ISBN: 5-15-000833-8
- OCLC: 39625727

Autumn Visits is a science fiction novel by Russian writer Sergey Lukyanenko, published in 1997 in book form. It is a novel written in a very unusual style for the author—shifting perspective of narrative.

== Plot introduction ==
In a poor, downtrodden Russia, a vector of future development of the world is being decided. Six Forces send their champions—Envoys, copies of real people, typical of their kind; they are almost the same as their prototypes. An Envoy can do only what that prototype can, but unlike them, envoys believe in their own forces, and thus can change the world. The Envoys have a main directive—to survive. The last surviving Envoy is deemed to be the most fit for the world, and guides it in the future.

== Plot summary ==
Six forces: Love, Growth, Knowledge, Power, Strength, and Art.

=== Kindness ===
This world (actually, the whole action takes place in Russia and Ukraine) lacks love; but the love this Envoy would bring the Kindness of fervent religion - leading to witch hunts and crusades. The Original for this Envoy is a female doctor, who has seen the consequences of love, kindness and compassion neglected in her patients dying without access to medicines and treatments. She believes her Envoy to be God, or a divine messenger, but appears rather blind to her other aspects.

=== Knowledge ===
The force of Knowledge would create a better, more reasonable world, but is hampered by physical fraility, and always ends up subjugated by power. The Envoy of knowledge would change that, but his Original is an old scientist suffering from terminal cancer, who is intelligent and wise, but physically impotent. Knowledge remembers his past incarnations with clarity, unlike the other Envoys and can extrapolate the actions of the others much better.

=== Art ===
The force of Art is rarely able to take action, hampered by its own imagination of the consequences. When it does, however, the actions are impassioned, and the result is rarely savoury, like the actions of a certain painter Schicklgruber. Art is represented by a 'hack' writer, cranking out several fantasy and sci-fi novels a year for money. The novel implies that some of Lukyanenko's other books are actually written by the Original of this Envoy. Specifically, he makes numerous references to having written The Boy and the Darkness.

=== Strength ===
Strength is the force that guarantees peace and security. A country with a strong army, without crime; a place to which warriors can proudly come home. Strength's Envoy is a copy of an Army Colonel who fought in Afghanistan. He is Ukrainian, and is in the Ukrainian army, but seems to regard the countries as close kin, almost as one. This Envoy and his Original do not see eye to eye on their vision of the future, because the Original has lost faith in his cause, while the copy retains his belief.

=== Power ===
Power represents a strong state, claiming people's loyalty, guiding their lives, and focusing their strength on a single purpose, but also punishing individual action, turning people into a herd being driven by a stern and beloved shepherd. This force is represented by an ambitious and corrupt politician, seeking to ascend to presidency. The Envoy murders and supplants his Original as soon as he arrives, because "power can't be shared". The novel implies that the current state of the world is in part the result of Power winning the last contest; Joseph Stalin and Napoleon Bonaparte are both implied to have been an Envoys of Power.

=== Growth ===
The forth of Growth represents progress and development, potential limited only by motivation. Unfortunately, Growth lacks direction, and has potential for both good and evil. Growth is, appropriately, represented by a teenager—a somewhat dour and cynical boy, who is implied to have lost his faith in the world. This Envoy and his Original begin to grow apart as the novel progresses, diverging, and even spending a lot of time away from each other, unlike most other Envoy/Original pairs. Unlike the other Envoys, Growth does not remember his past incarnations, as experience would defeat the purpose of growing.

=== Darkness ===
Although not mentioned as part of the six Forces, Darkness intervenes in the contest. Darkness is presented as ultimate freedom, even from the consequences of one's own actions. Darkness doesn't have an Envoy, but it still has a champion—a determined and driven professional hitman, whom Darkness empowers and directs to kill all the Envoys and their Originals.

=== Light ===
Although not part of this contest, the force of Light has intervened in past contests, and has won at least one. Jesus Christ is implied to have been a champion of Light. His death was a short-term loss but a long-term victory.
