= Line of Delirium =

1995 books by Sergei Lukyanenko

- 1998 edition
- Author: Sergei Lukyanenko (Сергей Лукьяненко)
- Original title: Linia Grez, Линия Грез (Russian)
- Language: Russian
- Series: Line of Delirium trilogy
- Genre: Space opera, Science fiction novel
- Publication date: 1995 (Russian edition)
- Publication place: Russia
- Media type: Print (Hardback & Paperback)
- ISBN: 5-237-00968-9
- OCLC: 41518540
- Preceded by: Shadows of Dreams [1995]
- Followed by: Emperors of Illusions [1995]

Line of Delirium and Emperors of Illusions are two 1995 books of a space opera trilogy by Russian science fiction writer Sergey Lukyanenko (Shadows of Dreams is a short prequel to Line of Delirium and is usually included in the second book). The story is told in third person, usually from the viewpoint of Kay Dutch (aka Kay Altos) — a professional bodyguard living in a post-war galaxy. The names of races, planets, and several leaders are borrowed from the computer game Master of Orion, although everything else in the trilogy is original, even the physical descriptions of several races.

These harsh novels are unusual for Lukyanenko — although heroes may evoke sympathy sometimes, none of them could be called positive. Strained action intertwines with insights on psychology of people living and succeeding in a nightmare.

== Plot summary ==
The first novel, Line of Delirium, takes place decades after a devastating interstellar conflict — the Vague War. While the reason for and details of the war remain largely unexplained, it is clear that almost every alien race was at some point involved in hostilities with the humans. The war was going badly for Earth, until two Earth officers decided to take matters into their own hands. Disobeying orders, they turned their fleet and headed for Earth, demanding the government's surrender. One of the officers, a man named Grey, established the Human Empire and became the emperor. His co-conspirator Lemak became the supreme commander of all human forces. While it is not exactly clear how the tide was turned, it is known that all races opposing the new empire were eventually beaten. Two of which, the cyborg Meklar and the ursine Bulrathi formed a subsequent pact with the humans — the Trinary Alliance, creating a nearly unbeatable force (humans excel at ship-to-ship combat, Meklar are master engineers, and Bulrathi are superb ground combatants).

Close to the end of the war, a man named Curtis van Curtis acquires an alien device he calls "aTan" (from athanatos, "immortal" [Greek: Αθάνατος, literally, "without death"] ) giving immortality to anyone who can afford it. He formed the aTan company, which quickly became almost as powerful as the Human Empire (as some characters in the novel call it, "an empire within an empire"). The secret of the device is coveted by many, as the aTan company holds exclusive rights, with Emperor Grey's grudging approval (in exchange he gets free reincarnations).

Kay Altos is a professional bodyguard whose homeworld was destroyed by the imperial forces after it was invaded by the Sakkra — a fast-multiplying frog-shaped race, which was subsequently exterminated by the Empire. One fine morning he wakes up to face a teenager holding a gun, trying to avenge his sister's accidental death at Kay's hands. Kay's main problem — he did not have time to pay for his next reincarnation. He tries to trick the kid but ends up dying anyway. He is surprised to find himself in an aTan facility on Terra — the capital of the Empire with none other than Curtis van Curtis himself greeting him. Van Curtis hires Altos to safely bring his only son Arthur to an obscure planet known as Grail. Van Curtis's main concern is anyone finding out that Arthur is his son and kidnapping him in order to find out his father's secrets. Kay's payment should he succeed — unlimited free reincarnations. His payment in case of failure — eternal torture and executions. Kay agrees, and a backstory is created where Kay Ovald is a space merchant, travelling with his son Arthur, when their ship explodes. After reincarnating on a planet in the middle of a civil war, Imperial Security officer Isabella Kal recognizes Arthur and begins to chase him all over the Empire, even going as far as asking Admiral Lemak for help.

Unfortunately for Arthur van Curtis and his bodyguard, Kal is not the only one seeking to stop them. A mysterious race known as the Silicoids seem to know of Arthur's mission to Grail and wish to prevent him from reaching his goal in order to preserve the galactic balance.

Kay and Arthur board a luxury liner to the next planet on their way to Grail. Altos knows that, in all likelihood, Imperial Security is waiting for them at their destination. They manage to get passage on a shuttle, dropping off several passengers on a world close to their course. By a stroke of misfortune, that shuttle is stopped by a quarantine ship, and all passengers are secretly taken to a planet belonging to the Darloks — an ancient race exceptional at espionage and sabotage. Kay and Arthur soon discover that the Darloks plan to turn them into their agents and also manage to learn the Darloks' true form (unlike Master of Orion, Darloks here are not shapeshifters but Goa'uld-like snake parasites). It is there that Kay first meets Viacheslav Shegal — an agent of "Shield", Emperor's special forces. He helps Shegal commit suicide (to be reincarnated on a human world), so that the true nature of Darloks is known to all. Meanwhile, a massive Silicoid fleet arrives and proceeds to bombard the planet from orbit. Troops are sent in to retrieve Kay and Arthur and bring them before Sedimin — the Foot of the Silicoid Basis (a rank equal to emperor). Sedimin wants to know the true mission that van Curtis entrusted to Arthur. It is on the Silicoid ship that Arthur finally reveals to Kay an awful truth — he is not Curtis van Curtis's son. Arthur is a clone and, as such, has no rights under Imperial law. As Arthur puts it, "immortals need no heirs." Since Arthur is being honest, Kay reveals that his true name is Kay Dutch and that he is a super — a genetically engineered being with increased speed, strength, memory, and other characteristics much higher than a normal human. By law, Kay also has no rights, but his past was covered up by a senator who adopted him. While Arthur still hides his true mission goal from Kay, he reveals it to Sedimin, who decides to let them go. They are dropped off on Tauri — a paradise planet for retired Imperial officers and their families. While Kay is out purchasing a ship, Arthur is kidnapped by Isabella Kal. Kay's determination to free Arthur is guided less by his obligation to his client than his friendship with the boy. His first destination, however, is the planet where he was killed prior to being recruited by van Curtis. He finds his killer, a teenager named Tommy Arano, and, instead of killing him, takes him to his hypership that was left on the planet. The next morning, Kay explains to Tommy that he is, in fact, Arthur van Curtis, whose mind was wiped by the Silicoids on one of his previous attempts to reach Grail. The mind-wiped Arthur was given to a human family to raise as their son, while another Arthur was reincarnated by "aTan" back on Terra because the machine assumed he died. Kay and Tommy then head to an Imperial planet almost entirely ruled by a crime syndicate known as 'the Family'. The Mother of the Family is his genetic sister, also created in a test tube. She uses the Family's resources to locate Arthur on a heavily defended Imperial station. She agrees to given them all they need to retrieve the boy: outfit their ship with a masking device, provide them with advanced power armor and weapons (including an "Excalibur" tachion rifle for Kay that shoots a full second before the trigger is pulled), and four soldiers — two conditioned humans, a human cyborg, and a Meklar. Kay has himself souped-up with artificial enhancements (drastically shortening his lifespan).

The strike group manages to infiltrate the base and fight their way to the medical wing, where Arthur is being tortured. Once Arthur is retrieved, they fight back to the ship, losing the two conditioned soldiers. In the hangar bay, Kay faces off against a Meklar working for Isabella Kal and is probably the first human (or almost-human) to pose a challenge to a twelve-foot-long mechanized reptile. Kay's Meklar companion clashes with the Imperial Security Meklar, giving the others time to escape. Once aboard his ship, Kay finds out that, due to his torture, Arthur is dying. Their only hope is to make it to Grail before he dies. When they finally make it Grail's orbit, another obstacle awaits them — Admiral Lemak and Isabella Kal on an Imperial destroyer. While Kay is trying to find a way out, his ship's illegal AI makes its own decision and the ship into the destroyer's shields. While Kay, Tommy, and Arthur are being reincarnated in Grail's branch of aTan, Kal forces Lemak to have her shot, so that she can follow them. The two clones and the bodyguard manage to make it to Grail's Dead Zone — an area on the planet where most mechanical devices fail for no apparent reason. It is there that Arthur finally reveals to Kay his true mission and the reason for van Curtis to have a clone: Curtis van Curtis did not obtain the "aTan" device from aliens. Van Curtis discovered Grail during the Vague War. There he found God or rather a being/machine that created the universe. God made van Curtis an offer — a universe created based on his subconscious desires, just like this universe was created for someone else. Van Curtis asked for more time to think about it. God then gave van Curtis the knowledge to create a device allowing him to live forever. Finally, after many decades, Curtis van Curtis decides to find out how new universes are created and sell these universes to the public. Kay realizes that this would destroy the Empire and attempts to stop them, but finds out that neither Tommy and Arthur nor Curtis van Curtis (who suddenly appears) can be killed in the Dead Zone. Van Curtis takes Arthur and Tommy and leads them to the Threshold, but Tommy refuses and opts to leave with Kay instead. The novel ends as they both walk towards an uncertain future.

Emperors of Illusions Book Cover

Emperors of Illusions is the second novel, continuing the story of Kay Dutch as he travels with Tommy Arano, trying to stop Curtis van Curtis from destroying the Human Empire. They believe he is trying to do that to get back at the person he believes responsible for the creation of this universe — Emperor Grey. The only way Kay thinks he can stop van Curtis is by killing the Emperor, a virtual impossibility.

"Shadows of Dreams" is a short prequel to "Line of Delirium" that describes life on a small quiet human colony that is turned upside down when a Psilon battleship enters the system, still believing that the Vague War is on. The Psilons are the most advanced race in the galaxy, with only two or three troopers wearing power armor necessary to destroy an entire city. As the colonists prepare for a hopeless battle, one man reflects on his life thus far.

== Characters ==
- Kay Dutch (AKA Kay Altos, AKA Kay Ovald) — a super (genetically engineered human with superior physical and mental abilities). Under Imperial law, he has no rights, or rather he would have no rights if anyone knew his true origins. Kay was created on the Second Colony of the Shedar system. A senator adopted and raised him, erasing all records of his "birth". When Shedar was invaded by the Sakkra, most women and children were evacuated. His adopted parents chose to stay and fight. They were killed when the Emperor ordered the colonies nuked. Kay's physical superiority did not manifest until he was 16 (just like it was supposed to). He ran away to the circus and, when he was old enough, joined the Bodyguard League. At some point, he purchased a hyperboat and installed an AI (illegal) on it. Kay is proficient in many alien languages and has knowledge of alien customs and rituals. He is currently on his seventh life (i.e. resurrected six times).
- Arthur van Curtis (AKA Arthur Ovald) — a clone of Curtis van Curtis. To prevent Arthur's extermination under Imperial law, van Curtis falsified the records and made it appear as though Arthur was his son. While officially 16 years old, biologically Arthur is only 12, due to the fact that he has died 73 times. Arthur is quite proficient in jen' — a relaxation and fighting technique. It also allows Arthur to stop his heart at will, in case he is captured and needs to escape via "aTan".
- Tommy Arano — Arthur van Curtis's double created by "aTan" and the Silicoids' mind-wipe techniques. He has no memory of his life prior to his 12th birthday. Secretly adopted by a human family who passed him off as their son, he lived the life of a normal teenager until the accidental death of his sister at Kay's hands. He killed Kay with a pain-inducing weapon and was shocked when the bodyguard returned several months later. When Kay explained the truth behind his origins, Tommy left with Kay to go save his double from ISB. When they reached Grail, Tommy refused to go with Curtis van Curtis and chose to stay with Kay. While his memories were erased, he does retain subconsciously everything Arthur learned before the wipe (e.g. he can perform jen' moves but does not know how to use them properly).
- Curtis van Curtis — the founder and owner of the aTan Corporation. During the war, he was one of many given a small raider ship and sent to perform guerilla attacks against the enemy. He returned with designs for the aTan device, supposedly purchased from the Psilons. Van Curtis is currently the second most powerful man in the Empire, after the Emperor, of course. He also must tread carefully, as many would like to know the secret to immortality and would go to extreme lengths to get it.
- Isabella Kal — an officer of the Imperial Security Bureau attached to the planet Incedios (or Insidious). She is loyal to the Emperor and is hateful of van Curtis and his "empire within the Empire". She gets her chance to prove her worth when she finds out that Arthur van Curtis is on Incedios. Before she can catch him, Kay and Arthur leave the planet, forcing her to go on an insane chase across the Empire and beyond to find the "immortal heir" and force the secrets out of him.
- Louis Nomachi - ISB officer attached to Incedios. Isabella Kal is his immediate superior. He is the one who figures out the identity of Arthur van Curtis and informs his boss. After initially supporting Kal's plan to go after the young van Curtis personally and reap the rewards of immortality, Nomachi begins to have second thoughts when he sees that Kal will go to any lengths to capture Arthur.
- Viacheslav Shegal — the top agent of "Shield", Emperor's Special Forces. Reports directly to the Emperor. Allows himself to be taken prisoner by Darlok agents in order to find out their true nature. Created the universe that the story takes place in. According to a fan-written short story, Shegal was a computer programmer on our Earth. Unlike van Curtis, who found God on another planet, Shegal found the being on the Internet. As it happens, he accepted the offer of a new universe after hours of playing Master of Orion. As such, his universe reflects that.
- Emperor Grey — the ruler of the Human Empire and one of the first people to use "aTan". As an officer during the war, he was disgusted with the way the Earth government was fighting it. When his fleet was sent to fight an unwinnable battle, Grey convinced his friend Lemak to turn the ships around and head for Earth. There, they forced the government's surrender, after which Grey became the first Emperor. In the later years, Grey has been almost apathetic to the happenings of the Empire. As expected, Grey is protected by the best minds and technology the Human Empire has to offer. When travelling, his shuttle is escorted by elite interceptors, each of which is capable of taking down a cruiser. His psyche is protected round-the-clock by a team of telepaths (while "aTan" can heal the body, it cannot do the same for the mind).
- Admiral Karl Lemak — promoted to admiral after helping Grey overthrow the inept Earth government. Like most officers during the war, Lemak distrusts aliens, even those under his command. His personal weapon is an Excalibur tachyon rifle, firing a full second before the trigger is pulled (does not break causality as it fires if and only if the trigger is pulled).
- Wanda Kahowski — the only female commander of a terror-group during the war. Nicknamed Wanda-Blood for her brutality in ending hundreds, if not thousands, of alien lives. One of the few humans with whom the aliens are still officially at war. Lives under the name of Henrietta Fiscalocci on the paradise planet Tauri. Her house is officially off-limits to ISB, a privilege granted by the Emperor himself. She has a numerous collection of wartime weapons (all in working condition) and engages in illegal neural growth of her cat, giving him an intelligence level of a teenage human.
- Rachel Haney — a teenage girl on the planet Tauri. She befriends Arthur while Kay and Arthur are on the planet and helps Kay defeat the ISB agents sent to kill him. After this, she has a crush on Kay and dreams of becoming a bodyguard in order to impress him. She has a younger sister named Lara.
- Lyka Seiker — the Mother of the Family, a powerful crime syndicate based on Gorra. Genetically related to Kay Dutch, as they were grown in the same test tube. Unlike Dutch, Lyka's mother survived the invasion and bombing of Shedar, so she was never sent to an orphanage. She can perform complex calculations in her head extremely fast, but her physical abilities are not as high as Dutch's.
- Sedimin — the leader of the Silicoids. His official title is the Foot of the Silicoid Basis, and every Foot is called Sedimin. Like all of his race, he is obsessed with universal balance. Sedimin became the Foot after challenging and killing the previous leader in a one-on-one combat.
- Shivukim Ahhar - one of the few Bulrathi ISB agents. Unlike most of his race, wields a ranged weapon in addition to his hand-to-hand combat skills. Prefers the honor of a one-on-one combat to a senseless shootout.
- Marjan Mohammadi - former bodyguard, now an ISB agent. She prefers cyber-enhancements to "aTan". Much of her body has been replaced with mechanical parts, but she is far from being a Meklar, whom she views as perfect. Marjan's body can take massive amounts of punishment and can partially regenerate afterwards. Familiar with Kay Dutch through her former line of work.
- T'san - Meklar ISB agent. Serves Isabella Kal without question. Apparently, his walking transformation shows slight asynchronism during movement. According to another Meklar, this could mean one of 2 things: a bad surgeon or a deliberate lowering of the efficiency of one transformation in order to boost another, such as the combat transformation.
- Kas's'is - Meklar at the employ of the Family. Faithful servant of Lyka Seiker. Given to Kay Dutch as a counter to T'san.
- Andrey - human cyborg at the employ of the Family. Former lover of Lyka Seiker (when he was fully human). Given to Kay Dutch to help him storm an Imperial military station.
- Vsevolod Martyzenski - famous weapon designer, currently employed by the Family. Created the Excalibur tachyon rifle, among many others. Ironically, he is a pacifist. When not creating tools of death, he attends peace rallies and debates. Usually, after each rally, Martyzenski returns to his lab upset and proceeds to design yet another gun. Whenever he has a "designer's block", the Family orchestrates a peace rally to jump-start his creativity.

== Differences from Master of Orion ==
- There are no "precursor" races. No Antarans or Orions.
- Silicoids are hovering columns of rock with few visible features. They are the only intelligent race without appendages. Instead, they generate focused EM fields which serve multiple purposes: allow them to hover and move, communicate with each other, manipulate physical objects, etc. They communicate with other races by vibrating their bodies to create speech, making them sound like a whispering choir. Their lives are centered around the idea of universal balance. The Silicoid Basis is ruled from the very bottom by the Foot of the Basis, a position equal to that of a human emperor. The reason the Foot rules from the bottom is because the entire Basis depends on the Foot for support. Each Foot is chosen between two candidates by the Balance. Translation: they fight to the death with the victor assuming the name Sedimin. Their philosophy of balance also dictates when they go to war. Until recently, Silicoid ships did not have external drives. Instead, they were moved by combined efforts of the crew.
- Bulrathi are the only race known to be able to defeat Silicoids in hand-to-EM field combat. This is mostly due to a quirk of evolution that gave the massive ursine creatures extremely high-pitched voices. They are able to create a sustained high-pitched sound that resonates with the Silicoid organ that generates their EM fields. A simple punch is enough to disable the organ, leaving the Silicoid motionless and defenseless. After the war, the Bulrathi entered the Trinary Alliance with humans and the Meklar. They have a gland, which, if punched strongly enough, can kill them (ironically, if this gland is punched, the bulrathi dies of pleasure).
- The Meklar are nearly impossible to defeat in hand-to-hand combat by a non-Meklar. Their origins are reptilian; however, they have long ago replaced much of their bodies with mechanical parts. Their weapons are usually built into their bodies, making them difficult to upgrade. Their mechanical parts can slightly change configuration and/or position to match a required action (e.g. walking transformation, combat transformation, resting transformation). They are capable of communicating with each other by a line-of-sight beam, which is nearly impossible to intercept. The Meklar are considered to be the best mechanics in the galaxy. Very little is revealed about their social or political structure, only that they are ruled by a being known as the Perfect One.
- Darloks are the most secretive of all races and are rumored to be as old as the Silicoids. Their lack of a strong military is more than compensated by their extremely adept spy network. They are capable of turning even the most loyal citizens against their government. It was assumed that they used mind-control technology to gain new recruits; however, a successful human intelligence operation revealed the truth — the Darloks are snake-like parasites, entering the host and taking over their mind (the original personality is destroyed). Silicoids seem to be the only race that the Darloks avoid, as the parasite is incapable of "infecting" a creature made of rock. The Darlok language has many complex levels and layers. The more proficient one is in speaking Darlok, the more respect that person gets. Very few non-Darloks are able to speak the language. Kay Dutch is one of them.
- The Sakkra, often called "white frogs" by humans, have been completely exterminated by the Human Empire after their invasion of the human Shedar system. The Emperor justified the extermination by stating that the uncontrolled population growth of the "frogs", which led to their invasion of Shedar in search of more breeding grounds, was a danger to all other races.
- The Alkari were the first to discover interstellar travel. Their ships are more maneuverable than other races' because the Alkari are the only avian race and, therefore, think in three-dimensional terms. Their ships also tend to be smaller to take full advantage of their inertialess drives and allow for the pilot to be linked with the ship via a neural net. As far as they are concerned, the galaxy should have been theirs. Instead, younger races (mainly humans) forced them back into their territory. Resigned to leave the galaxy to the other races, the Alkari are developing a way to leave for another galaxy, where they cay finally fulfil their destiny. The Alkari possess a purely visual memory. In order for something to be retained, an Alkari must first visualize it. They perceive their memories in terms of a tapestry.
- The Psilons are the most technologically advanced race in the galaxy. Their grounds troops are especially feared. During the siege of Earth in the war, three Psilon troopers completely leveled the city of Vilnius. Psilon power armor allows a single soldier to take on an entire enemy division. In combat, Psilons take no prisoners. The only exception are those who demonstrate great prowess and are able to single-handedly kill many Psilon soldiers. Those are left alive and kept as slaves. Physically, the Psilons are extremely weak, forcing them to use their advanced technology to defend themselves. After the war, the Psilons retreated to their own space and stopped interacting with other races. According to Curtis van Curtis, their last interaction was the sale of the "aTan" device to him.
