= Genome (novel) =

1999 novel by Sergei Lukyanenko

- Author: Sergei Lukyanenko (Сергей Лукьяненко)
- Original title: Genom, Геном (Russian)
- Language: Russian
- Series: Genome
- Genre: Space Opera, Science fiction novel, detective novel
- Publisher: AST (Russia)
- Publication date: 1999 (Russian edition)
- Publication place: Russia
- Media type: Print (Hardback & Paperback)
- Pages: 368
- ISBN: 5-17-004496-8
- OCLC: 65173893
- Preceded by: Dances on the Snow [2001]
- Followed by: Cripples [2004]

Genome (Russian: Геном, Genom) is a science fiction/detective novel by the popular Russian sci-fi writer Sergei Lukyanenko. The novel began a series also called Genome, consisting of Dances on the Snow (a prequel, although written later) and Cripples (a sequel). The novel explores the problems of the widespread use of human genetic engineering, which alters not only human physiology but also psychology.

== The Universe ==
The novel takes place in the latter half of the 22nd century. Humans have left their cradle, colonized numerous extrasolar planets, and made contact with extraterrestrials, or "aliens", as most humans call them, even though such term is not considered to be politically correct. All humans are subjects of the Empire, ruled by a small child, although all decisions are made by the Imperial Council in his name. After the end of the conflicts between the Empire and the aliens several decades prior, the galaxy is, mostly, at peace, although relations are still tense between many of the species. To maintain the peace, the Empire was forced to quarantine its own colony of Ebon, which contained a large part of the Imperial military industry and provided a sizable percentage of soldiers. The ideology of the people of Ebon, formed by the ruling Church of the Angered Christ, demands the complete extermination of all alien life in the Universe to make way for the true children of God — humans. The fleet of Ebon was annihilated, and the planet itself was placed under a quarantine shield. Any Ebonite found outside the shield was forced to undergo deep psychotherapy.

=== Alien Races ===
- Czygu: while on the outside they are similar to Earth insects, their biological makeup is radically different. They are roughly human-sized and can even be mistaken for a human in appropriate attire. Their bodies naturally produce mercaptan (which caused humans to call them "stinkies" on occasion), which forces them to wear full body suits or ingest special medicine to suppress the emission of odorous substances when visiting human worlds. They possess technology allowing them to biologically transform their exterior appearance to match that of the humans. In this form, a Czygu female is nearly indistinguishable from a young human female. Czygu live in close communities, similar to Earth beehives or anthills, with strict hierarchy and rules of behavior. The Czygu are ruled by the privileged females, while most of the jobs are performed by male drones, who have only recently attained self-awareness (a mindless drone would be unable to operate complex equipment). Drones have absolute loyalty to their rulers built into their genes. The Czygu are in a state of conflict with the Brauni.
- Brauni: very little is mentioned in the novel about them. Apparently, they are extremely warlike. Civilian ships are advised to stay away from special zones which are sites for Brauni ritual battles. They periodically enter into a state of battle madness, become extremely aggressive and completely out-of-control — a threat to anyone around them. The Brauni are in a state of conflict with the Czygu.
- Fanhuan: almost nothing is known about this race. They are described as slow creatures with pseudo-wings.
- Taii: an ancient sentient race, a former galactic superpower. After a devastating interstellar war with an unknown foe, the Taii were victorious, but it was a Pyrrhic victory, as the damage they sustained turned out to be unrepairable. They inhabit a mere several dozen worlds, have long ago stopped expanding, and are slowly dying out. While gigantic Taii starships still patrol space, which used to be theirs, they present little threat to modern warships (it has been stated that a small human destroyer is capable of completely incinerating a colossal Taii ship with a single barrage).
- Halflings: short, stout humanoids, covered with profuse body hair. Very little else is mentioned in the novel.

=== Speshes and clones ===
Humanity continues the eugenic practice started long ago (in this regard, the novel is reminiscent of Lukyanenko's short story The Road to Wellesberg). Even as far back as the 21st century, methods were developed allowing the alteration of a human's genotype to adapt him or her to a particular position. Such operation (or "specification") is performed on a just-conceived fetus at the request of the parents, who, by doing this, forever decide the future of their child. Specified humans are called "specs", while non-modified humans are labeled "naturals". The cost of specification, the possibility of getting a credit for the procedure, and other conditions depend on the planet's demand in the requested profession. Specs are genetically compatible with naturals, as the former retain their non-modified genotype, and specified genes are only passed on if both parents possess them; however, the latter case still remains a choice on the parents' part. This allows the retention of specification without the help of geneticists (but only if the speshes wish for their children to have the same specification) but also allows the return to the original genotype in just one generation.

Even during early childhood, a future spesh develops brilliant abilities and a great interest in his or her future profession. The metamorphosis occurs around puberty, which involves the restructuring of the body and mind to match the specification. This takes place within several hours, usually under the watchful eye of a doctor. During this time, the person is completely helpless and does not perceive his or her surroundings. First, the body restructures itself, then the same thing happens to the psyche and the intellect, the latter being the most difficult and dangerous part of the metamorphosis. The spec's genetically-imprinted knowledge is activated; the visions experienced differ depending on the particular specification. For example, a master-pilot sees him- or herself flying through space, feeling completely happy. The undesirable abilities are suppressed. For example, pilots, detectives, and tax inspectors lose their ability to love, so that extraneous emotions do not interfere with their duties.

After the metamorphosis, no matter the actual age, the spec attains the full legal status of an adult and a rightful citizen of the Empire. However, not all knowledge is preprogrammed into the specs, and they are still required to attend schools and academies. Legally, a spec has a right to remove any genetic alteration, if he or she is unhappy with his or her current position. However, practically, this is unrealistic — first of all, not all changes are reversible, and second, as part of the metamorphosis, the spec is conditioned to completely love his or her job.

After completing training, a spec spends the rest of his or her life doing his or her favorite job, loving it and understanding that the job is done well. Every spec possesses immunity from most known diseases. They are highly paid and possess a higher social status than naturals, as well as higher respect among the fellow specs. It is said that "specs are happy from the cradle to the grave". A spec can only become unhappy if he or she is not allowed to perform his or her job or is incapable of performing it, although the latter is usually due to external reasons.

Most naturals do not have as high a salary as the specs and are usually forced to take on jobs that do not require special skills (valets, waiters, etc.). On the other hand, true creative jobs cannot be specified. There are no writers-spec or scientists-spec. Attempts at creating businessmen-spec and politicians-spec have also been largely unsuccessful. All of these professions belong to the naturals. Extraordinary naturals have been known to perform certain jobs on par with specs, although these cases are rare. The exceptions include jobs which a natural is physiologically unable to perform, such as an energetic-spec, who works directly with reactors and must be able to handle lethal doses of radiation. Also, almost no natural is completely unmodified, as several more general modifications are used by virtually everyone, including visual correction to fix bad eyesight and neural shunts allowing direct brain-to-computer interface.

Besides specs and naturals, there is also a third group of people: they are genetically modified but lack any moral restrictions programmed into speshes.

The need for colonization of new worlds led to underpopulation, which was partially compensated by mass cloning. Many clones currently live in the Empire, having the same legal rights as normal humans but are traditionally named after their prototype with "C-number" as a middle name (e.g. Andrey C-third Sidorov is the third clone of a man named Andrey Sidorov). All attempts to clone geniuses failed, as their clones have been unable to do any of the things their prototypes did. However, best specs are actively cloned.

Xenophobia is still present in human society: most specs see themselves as the naturals' betters, while the naturals tend not to like specs; also, many normal humans have misgivings about clones; and, of course, there is the distrust and dislike most humans feel for aliens.

=== Several specifications ===
- Master-pilot
  Specification: piloting of a spaceship. Captains are usually selected from pilots.
  Enhanced vision. Precisely determines distance (to the nearest centimeter, if the distance is less than 10 meters) and speed of any visible object. Increased tolerance to acceleration. Retains mobility up to 6 g and manual dexterity up to 12 g. Can jump from a height of 10 meters without any ill effects. After a dangerous car accident, can get up and walk away without so much as a broken bone. Enhanced hand-eye coordination. Instinctively attempts to maintain maximally stable position in any location (even planetside). Feels discomfort if the body position is potentially dangerous. Enhanced memory and logical reasoning. Possesses built-in psychological knowledge.
  Personality characteristics: honesty, goodness, loyalty, sense of duty, courage. A pilot must, if necessary, give his or her life to save the lives of the passengers. Incapable of denying aid to anyone he or she perceives as entrusted to him or her (could be a crew member, a passenger, any other human who happens to be under the pilot's wing).
  Pilots' ability to love is artificially suppressed. Instead, they have the ability to love their ship.
  Enhanced moral qualities forbid the pilot from engaging in immoral actions; however, law-abiding qualities in of themselves have not been enhanced. Personal moral code is more important for a pilot than the law. This is due to the fact that pilots visit numerous worlds, each of which has different laws. As such, it would be dangerous to stick to one particular set of rules.
- Energetic
  Specification: operation of power plants. This profession is spec-only.
  Physical abilities: able to determine temperature of a flame to a thousandth of a degree at a glance, eyes modified to perceive a wider spectrum of radiation and energy. The energetic's organism is specially-conditioned to resist radiation lethal to others, which requires the alteration in the makeup of the skin. Long hair acts as an anti-radiation screen, protecting the head. Male energetics are capable of pulling testicles into their bodies while working.
- Detective
  Specification: investigating crimes. According to the official statistics, a detective-spec solves 99.3% of cases.
  Small physical changes: enhanced sensory organs, brain implants allowing direct access to nearby computer systems. Enhanced logic, memory, deductive reasoning. Completely fearless.
  The law-abiding qualities of a detective-spec are enhanced to the maximum. He or she is ready, if the law demands it, to send a hungry child, who stole a loaf of bread, to the gallows, or release a monstrous serial killer. Incapable of feeling pity, love, or sympathy. They are replaced with a passion for truth. The unemotional, dry personal qualities of detectives-spec causes most to derogatorily refer to them as "crackers".
- Fighter
  Multiple variations of this specification are available. Most fighters-spec have deceptively-thin shoulders. Abilities: lightning-fast reaction and movement speed, enhanced physical strength (capable of breaking a person's neck with just fingers), sharp hearing. A special form of martial arts was developed specifically for fighters-spec called ju-dao, which naturals or any other specs are physically incapable of using.
- Hetaera
  Also known as geishas-spec. Capable of instantly falling in love with her client and does everything she can to get him to fall in love with her, if that is at all possible. Sex with a hetaera-spec is amazing. After the need in her is gone, a hetaera-spec is capable of quickly falling out of love. When there are no clients nearby, hetaeras-spec flirt with each other. They can be hired for one night or even years as high-class escorts. It is not mentioned in the novel if there is a male version of the spec.
- Executioner
  A specification developed on Ebon. An executioner-spec deeply hates aliens and wishes nothing more than to destroy them.
  Knows well the alien physiology. Convinced that aliens are enemies of humankind (which is not necessarily untrue). Executioners-spec who have gone through psychotherapy still hate aliens, but wish to destroy them with peaceful methods like technology, economics, culture, and population.
- Guide
  An expert at guiding human tourists to alien planets and vice versa. Able to converse in alien languages. Completely loves aliens.
- Servant
  Spec developed on the isolated planet Heraldica, ruled by descendants of ancient aristocratic families. Servants-spec, as opposed to normal servants or slaves, are incapable of rebellion or escape, allowing their rulers unseen before absolute power. Such power has made them decadent. Perverted sports are practiced on Heraldica among the ruling class, such as "hunting the servants". Servants-spec, like most other specs, voluntarily choose their specification for their children.
- Janitor
  Low-level, cheap spec for parents who are unable to afford a higher-quality specification.
  Physical changes include long arms and hairy palms for use as brooms. Also, a pouch is added on the janitor-spec's chest to hold trash. Psychologically incapable of littering. Very friendly demeanor.

== Main characters ==
- Alex Romanov — pilot-spec, ship captain, planet Earth.
- Kim Ohara — secret agent-spec, planet Eden.
- Hang Morrison — pilot-spec, Free Colonies (born in space).
- Paul Lurie — energetic-spec, planet Earth.
- Janet Ruelo — spec, five specifications, ship's doctor, planet Ebon.
- Pak Generalov — navigator, natural, homosexual.
- Danila C-third Shustov — guide-spec, third clone of Danila Shustov.
- Zei-so — Czygu female. Heiress to the throne.
- Sei-so — Czygu female. Zei-so's companion.
- Peter C-forty-fourth Valk, AKA Sherlock Holmes — detective-spec, forty-fourth clone of Peter Valk, planet Zodiac.
- Jenny Watson — doctor, forensics expert, detective's assistant, natural, planet Zodiac.

== Plot ==
Alex Romanov is a pilot-spec, born on Earth, gets out of the hospital on the planet Mercury Bottom, where he spent six months after an accident. Alex meets Kim Ohara, a runaway fourteen-year-old girl, who is an unformed fighter-spec, escaped from her home on Eden. He invites the hungry girl to dine, but, during dinner, her metamorphosis kick in. Unfortunately, the process must take place in a hospital under the watchful eyes of qualified doctors, but Alex is out of money and does not know anyone on this planet. As a pilot-spec, Alex is psychologically incapable of not helping someone in his charge. He takes her to a cheap hotel (the Hilton) and tries to help her through the transformation. For this he needs medicine, but he has spent everything he had left on the hotel room. He uses the network terminal in the hotel to search for work. He surprisingly quickly locates a perfect and extremely attractive offer — the post of captain on a small but new ship Mirror with the right to choose his own crew. While Alex is skeptical that this is just too good to be true, he has no choice but to sign the contract. He gets his advance and uses the money to help Kim.

During the metamorphosis, Kim reveals that she has a secret compartment in her body, containing a fairly large gel-crystal — one that is usually used in a supercomputer. The crystal costs a fortune, and the fact that a poor, hungry girl is carrying it around makes no sense at all. With Alex's help, Kim successfully goes through the metamorphosis overnight and is completely fine in the morning. She refuses to talk about herself or of how she got to the planet. She only confirms that she does not know anyone on the planet and has no job or identification.

Taking command of his ship, Alex begins the process of hiring his new crew. He hires a Black-race doctor named Janet Ruelo from the quarantined planet Ebon, a spec with five specifications. Other crewmembers include a nineteen-year-old energetic-spec Paul Lurie and a navigator-natural Pak Generalov. Later, he hires a co-pilot, a spec named Hang Morrison. Instead of looking for a fighter-spec (the crew requirements are very specific in the contract), he decides to give Kim a try. However, this is problematic, given that she has no ID. In order to obtain one without contacting Eden, he has to bend the rules: Alex and Kim get temporarily married, Kim takes Alex's last name as her own, and gets a new ID as Kim Romanova.

With his crew ready, Alex is ordered by the owner of the ship to take on several passengers and do whatever they ask. The passengers turn out to be two Czygu tourists, Zei-so and Sei-so, as well their guide-spec Danila C-third Shustov, an employee of the Sky Company, who are also the owners of the Mirror. Apparently, as Alex finds out, their job is to transport alien tourists to see Imperial planets. Unfortunately, the situation is not very pleasant. One of Janet Ruelo's specifications is as an executioner-spec, meaning she specialized in killing aliens and utterly hates them. Kim becomes hysterical, after finding out that one of their stops is the planet Eden, as she is afraid to return to her homeworld. Alex finds out that Pak Generalov pathologically hates clones and has a hard time accepting C-third on their ship. Alex has to convince Kim, demand Janet to give him a warrior's oath not to harm the Czygu, and reason with Generalov. There is another problem, however. After a genetic test, Alex finds out that Kim is not only a fighter-spec, but also a hetaera-spec. The latter specification demands the love of her object of desire, who turns out to be Alex. But Alex, being a pilot-spec, is physically incapable of loving Kim. And Kim physically cannot stop loving Alex until he returns her feelings.

The tour almost immediately results in a disaster. While entering the hyperchannel, another ship nearly collides with the Mirror which would have forced the ship to end up in Brauni space. Alex's Czygu passengers would have almost certainly been taken prisoner. Fortunately, with Janet's quick thinking, they were able to avoid the collision.

During the flight, Kim reveals to Alex the secret of her gel-crystal. Apparently, the crystal contains an encoded personality of a friend of Kim's, an adolescent boy named Edgar. Edgar explained to Kim that his personality was artificially created to become a unique spec — a genetic constructor, a spec creator. Growing up within the crystal's virtual world, Edgar managed to gain access to the public network, meeting Kim. He then programmed his lab's robot to give the crystal to Kim and destroy the lab, so that everyone thinks that Edgar's crystal perished with it. Kim have long protected Edgar's secret, carrying his crystal inside her body. Unfortunately, her mother accidentally discovered the crystal and called the police. Kim and Edgar were forced to flee. Alex, connecting the crystal to his personal computer, enters Edgar's virtual world and meets the boy. While Edgar confirms Kim's story, Alex sees certain inconsistencies in his virtual surroundings and the boy's behavior.

Alex asks Edgar for a favor — to create a substance which would temporarily disable a spec's emotional modifications. Alex wants to give this substance to Kim to "cure" her of her love for him. While no one believes that such a thing is possible, Alex finds out that Edgar is truly a genius. He gives Alex a formula to synthesize the blocker, and Alex orders it from a pharmaceutical lab on the planet New Ukraine. However, before risking giving an untested substance to Kim, Alex takes a few drops of it himself. The effect is nearly immediate — Alex loses the pleasurable feeling every pilot-spec gets during the neural connection with the ship. Also, he understands that this feeling, like the usual pleasures of sex — are simply shadows of the true feeling which he has been denied. Still not understanding what it means to love, Alex begins to feel sorrow and the feeling of enormous loss.

Before landing on the planet Zodiac, the crew finds out that a crime has taken place on board the ship — Zei-so has been brutally murdered. The ship remains in orbit and receives two visitors: a detective-spec named Peter C-forty-fourth Valk, preferring the name Sherlock Holmes, and his assistant, a natural forensics expert Jenny Watson. While the crime itself is horrendous, the consequences are even more so. Apparently, Zei-so was an heiress to the Czygu throne. As such, the Czygu are preparing for an all-out war with the Empire. Since the forces are about even, the war is bound to devastate both species, and the victor will be too weak to stand against the other races, who will not miss their chance to gain extra territory. This has already happened to the once-mighty Taii, who are now a dying race. The Empire, faced with such prospects, will be forced to lift the quarantine of Ebon. The military power of Ebon is so great, that the Czygu will have no chance, but the other races will forget their differences and united against humanity. There is only one way of preventing the war — find the murderer within two days and show the Czygu undeniable proof that justice has been served. If Sei-so personally executes the killer, the war will be averted. Unfortunately, the murder was committed by a professional — no trace has been left in Zei-so's quarters. Also, every crew member had the opportunity and the motive to perform the deed.

After further conversing with Edgar, Alex realizes who he really is. He is not an adolescent consciousness artificially grown in a gel-crystal. In fact, it is the consciousness of a long-dead legendary genetic constructor named Edward Garlitsky, who is credited with founding the science of specification. Garlitsky wanted to create a superhuman, who would unite all the enhancements from all specs. Unfortunately, his work was not only deemed unneeded, it was seen as dangerous. Garlitsky was fired and, at the Emperor's decree, his consciousness was copied onto a gel-crystal and his body destroyed, so he could continue working on specifications but under a watchful eye of the overseers. Unable to find another way out, Garlitsky saw his chance when he was requested to create a new secret agent specification. He made certain unnoticed alterations to the specification, like a hidden pouch in the stomach. This child turned out to be Kim Ohara. Garlitsky made contact with her, falsifying his identity, and convinced her to help him escape. His goal is to become a physical human again.

When Alex claims he knows the identity of the killer, the detective-spec allows him to do whatever is necessary to reveal him or her. Using Edgar's blocker, Alex reveals the killer — an undercover agent-spec, pretending to be a member of the crew. The killer is apprehended and executed, although Sei-so is critically wounded in the process. Unfortunately, further investigation turns out to be fruitless, as everything points to people too powerful to accuse. The Sky Company is bankrupted, and the crew of the Mirror is fired. The body of the executed person is bought out by Kim, who plans to give it Edward "Edgar" Garlitsky. Alex begins to understand that the effect of Edgar's substance is not temporary, which means that he will retain the ability to love for a long time, possibly forever.

== Critical response ==
Reviewer Patrick L. McGuire praises many aspects of Genome in an essay in The New York Review of Science Fiction:

- It "illustrates some of the features of Russian sf in the early post-Soviet period, in particular its renewed acquaintance with Anglophone sf and with other features of Western culture."
- In the closing section, Lukyanenko hides a sort of acrostic message for his readers: "This novel is a parody of space opera and cyberpunk. The author values your sense of humor..."
- In other examples of humor, "Lukyanenko invokes American brand names. Alex eats at a McRobbins fast-food place (McDonald's has evidently merged with Baskin-Robbins) and stays at a Hilton. The hotel chain, as the author explains, has moved downmarket over time to a niche of minimal but decent lodging. Compare Heinlein's use of small-h "hilton" to mean "hotel" in Double Star (1956)."
- Various homages to Sherlock Holmes and Dr. Watson, Peter Falk, Rudyard Kipling, Lois McMaster Bujold, and possibly the number 42.
