= Sergei Lukyanenko =

Russian author (born 1968)

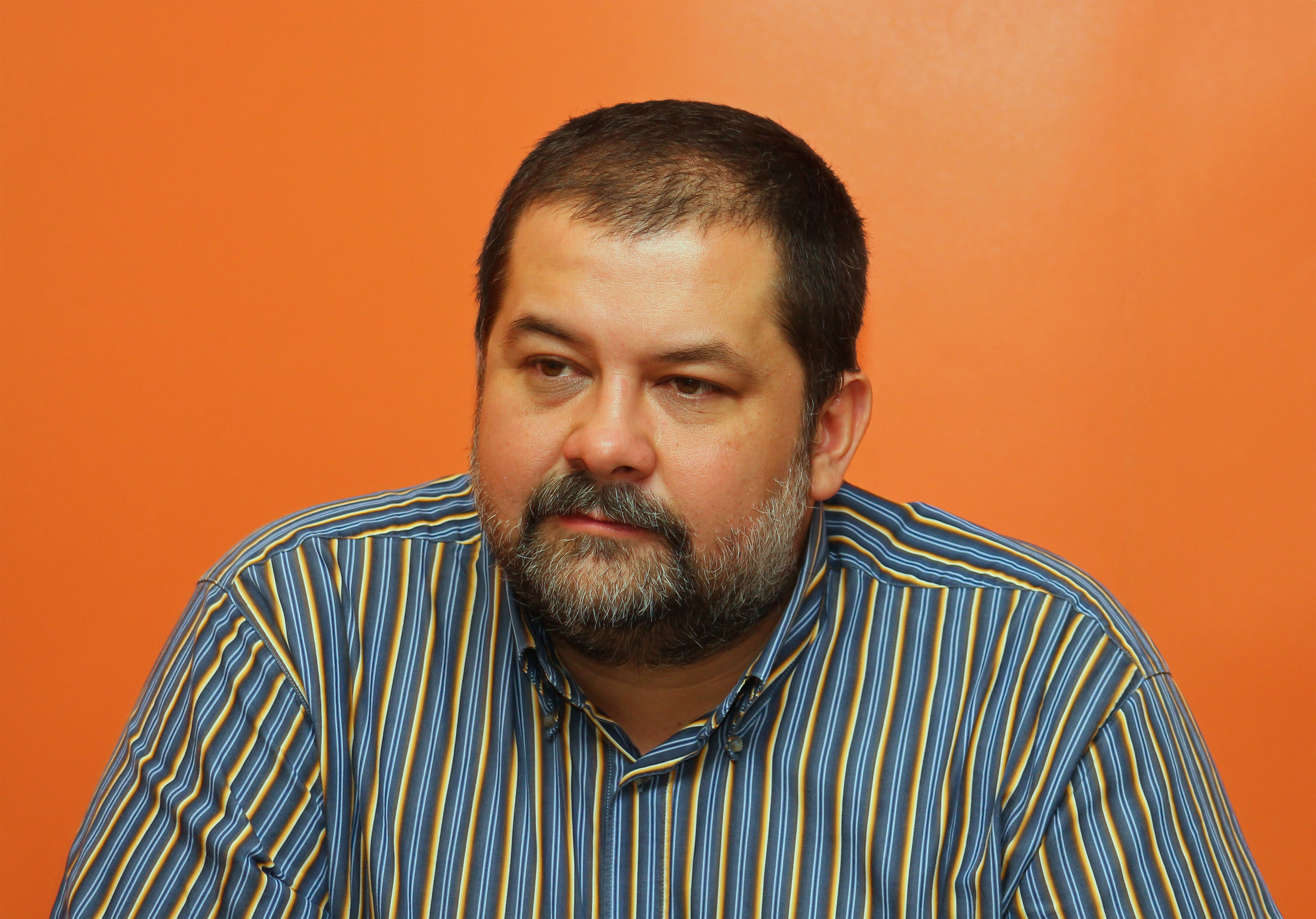
- Lukyanenko in 2011
- Born: Sergei Vasilyevich Lukyanenko; April 11, 1968 (age 58); Karatau, Kazakh SSR, Soviet Union
- Education: Alma-Ata State Medical Institute
- Occupations: Physician, writer, journalist, blogger
- Writing career
- Genres: Science fiction, fantasy
- Notable works: Labyrinth of Reflections; Night Watch series
- Website: lukianenko.ru/eng

Sergei Vasilyevich Lukyanenko (Russian: Серге́й Васи́льевич Лукья́ненко, IPA: [sʲɪrˈɡʲej vɐˈsʲilʲjɪvʲɪtɕ lʊˈkʲjænʲɪnkə]; born 11 April 1968) is a Russian science fiction and fantasy author, writing in Russian. His works often feature intense action-packed plots, interwoven with the moral dilemma of keeping one's humanity while being strong. Some of his works have been adapted into film productions, for which he wrote the screenplays.

== Biography ==
Lukyanenko was born in Karatau, Kazakhstan, then a part of the Soviet Union. After graduating from school, he moved to Alma-Ata, and enrolled at the Alma-Ata State Medical Institute in 1986 majoring in psychotherapy. He had started writing as a student, and in 1992 had just started making money from it. During this time he became an active member in Russian fandom, visiting conventions and attending seminars all around the Soviet Union. In 1996 he moved to Moscow where he currently resides.

=== Name transliteration ===
Lukyanenko's name is romanized as Sergey Lukianenko on the English version of his official website and as Sergei Lukyanenko by his publisher on works translated into English. Other spellings such as Sergey Lukyanenko are also found.

== Writing career ==
=== Early years ===
Lukyanenko started writing in the mid-1980s, and his first publication, the short story "Misconduct" ("Where The Mean Enemy Lurks", although written earlier, was published later), followed soon in 1988.

=== After dissolution of the Soviet Union ===
After the dissolution of the Soviet Union and the switch to the market economy, Russian authors now had to struggle with unfamiliar realities of a free publishing system.

Lukyanenko, though, fared somewhat better than the others, already having made something of a name in Russian science fiction circles. After moving from Kazakhstan to Moscow, he continued to write there, now often venturing into literary experiments – like the religiously themed alternative history dilogy Seekers of the Sky, where he experimented with language stylization.

=== Breakthrough ===
The novel Night Watch marked Lukyanenko's return to the fantasy genre.

The 2004 film Night Watch (Nochnoy dozor), based on the book, was regarded as "the first Russian blockbuster." The film grossed over $16 million in Russia, a box office record at that time. In the United States, an adaptation of the film was released by Fox Searchlight. The film Day Watch (Dnevnoy dozor) was released in Russia on January 1, 2006, and it was released in the US on June 1, 2007. He also released a number of sequels to the Watch series.

== Foreign releases ==
Until 2006 relatively few of Lukyanenko's works had been released outside of Russia, mostly in Baltic states, Bulgaria and Poland. Even fewer were commercially published in English. However, success of the movies finally changed the situation. Night Watch, translated by Andrew Bromfield, was published in English in July 2006, Day Watch followed in January 2007, Twilight Watch was published in July 2007.

== Literary analysis ==
Lukyanenko himself said that his work has been heavily influenced by that of Robert A. Heinlein, the Strugatsky brothers and Vladislav Krapivin, and that he hopes to be remembered as a literary follower of the Strugatsky brothers. Although his books are often set in harsh worlds, Lukyanenko is a humanist writer, and in this sense believes he follows in the footsteps of the Strugatsky brothers. In May 2000, Boris Strugatsky referred to the spirit of the brothers' books as "that goodness with fists, those tortured attempts by the heroes to remain kind while being strong", and added "this is the underlying theme for Lukyanenko: how to preserve your goodness in the world of evil when you are strong and well-armed."

== Position on politics ==
Lukyanenko has been known as an avid supporter of copyright, i. e. harsh measures against copyright infringement, traditionally widespread among Russian readership. During the large meeting of various authors and business people titled "Copyright defense on internet" in 2013 he complained that "only 1% of all downloads of his latest book were legal downloads".

Lukyanenko kept a blog at LiveJournal, posting both personal and public information or snippets of a book in progress. On his website and his blog, Lukyanenko has repeatedly spoken out against the international adoption of Russian orphans, especially by Americans. His first blog was discontinued on 11 July 2008 after a conflict with readers over the issue. He started another blog a few days later, promising firmer moderation policies. Lukyanenko welcomed the Dima Yakovlev Law banning the international adoption of children from Russia in response to the US Magnitsky Act.

Lukyanenko condemned the Euromaidan movement of 2013-14, saying that it would be followed by a forced Ukrainization, which is "as much of a crime as a forced sex change". Lukyanenko, having Ukrainian ancestry himself, threatened authors supporting the Euromaidan that he would make every effort to prevent their books being published in Russia. He also forbade translation of his books into the Ukrainian language. He welcomed the March 2014 annexation of Crimea by the Russian Federation.

In February 2014 Lukyanenko announced a boycott of Denmark because of the culling of a giraffe at the Copenhagen Zoo.

On 28 February 2022, Lukyanenko was the leading signatory of a public letter with a few other authors supporting the Russian military invasion of Ukraine launched four days earlier. The letter makes allegations of NATO's "secret plans to destroy Russia", Western countries' "embracement of Nazis", calls the 2014 Crimean status referendum legitimate and "free", and claims Russia's invasion aimed at "bringing peace in Europe".

On 3 September 2022, at Chicon 8, the World Science Fiction Society passed a resolution condemning Lukyanenko's pro-invasion views and asking that he be disinvited as Guest of Honor at the 2023 Worldcon in Chengdu.

In late October 2022, Lukyanenko appeared as a guest on the RT show of Anton Krasovsky when Krasovsky mocked rapes of Ukrainian civilians by Russian soldiers and called for Ukrainian children to be drowned or burned alive and the rest of the country shot. "Whoever says that Moscow occupied them, you drown them in a river with a strong undercurrent [...] shove them into huts and burn them up." When asked how Russia could annex Ukraine when this would mean incorporating many people who did not wish to live under Russian rule, Krasovsky suggested: "So we shoot them." After the show, Lukyankeno released a statement condemning Krasovsky's statement.

== Bibliography ==
=== Short stories ===
- "Misconduct"
- "H is for Human"
- "Nuclear Dream"
- "Gadget"
- "Don't Panic!"

=== Novels ===
- The Boy and the Darkness
- Autumn Visits
- Not the Time for Dragons
- Dances on the Snow
- Spectrum
- Competitors
- QuaZi

==== Series ====
- A Lord from Planet Earth
- Island Russia
- Line of Delirium
- Labyrinth of Reflections
- Genome

==== Tetralogy ====
- Knights of Forty Islands
- The Stars Are Cold Toys
- Cold Coasts
- Rough Draft

==== Hexalogy ====
- Night Watch
- Day Watch
- Twilight Watch
- Last Watch
- New Watch
- Sixth Watch

== Awards ==
Year	Awarder	Award
1993	"Aelita"	"Start Award" for his tale Atomny son (Атомный сон – Nuclear Dream)
1995	"Interpresscon"	short form "Interpresscon Award" for his short story Fugu v mundire – Poached fugu
1995	"Sibcon"	"Sword of Rumatha" Award for "Knights of forty islands" novel
1996	"Interpresscon"	"Interpresscon Award" for "Servant" tale
1997	"Stranger"	"Sword of Rumatha" Award for "Imperiors of Illusions" dilogy
1998	"SF Forum"	"Sigma-F" Award for "Autumn Visits" novel
1998	"Zilantkon"	Award "Big Zilant" for "Labyrinth of Reflections" novel
1999	"Aelita"	"Aelita" award for general progress in the Science Fiction genre
1999	"Stranger"	"Stranger" award in the nomination "Major form" for "Night Watch" novel
1999	"Star Bridge"	"Silver Kladutsey" award in the nomination "Serials and sequels" for "False Mirrors" novel
1999	"Star Bridge"	"Silver Kladutsey" award in the nomination "Major form" for "Night Watch" novel
2000	"Interpresscon"	"Interpresscon" award in the nomination "Major form" for "False Mirrors" novel
2000	Special Award	"Best literature murder of Yury Semetsky" for "Genome" novel
2000	"Star Bridge"	"Gold Kladutsey" award in the nomination "Serials and sequels" for "Day Watch" novel
2000	Special Award	from the "Kharkov's institute crankes" award for outstanding merits in the Science Fiction
2001	"Russcon"	"Gold Russcon" award for "Day Watch" novel
2001	"Interpresscon"	"Russian S.F." award for "Seekers of the Sky" dilogy
2001	"Lituanikon"	1st place in the nomination "best novel of foreign author"
2001	"Star Bridge"	"Silver Kladutsey" award in the nomination "Serials and sequels" for "Morning Nears" novel
2001	"Stranger"	"Stranger" award in the nomination "Minor form" for "Evening conference with Mr Separate Deputy" short story
2002	"Ruscon"	"Alisa" award for "Dances in the Snow" novel
2002	"Interpresscon"	"Interpresscon" award in the nomination "Minor form" for "From fate" short story
2003	"Ruscon"	"Gold russcon" award for "Spectrum" novel
2003	"Ruscon"	"Silver russcon" award for "Frontier time" short story
2003	"Kiyvcon	"Big Urania" award for "Spectrum" novel
2003	"SF Forum"	"Sigma-F" Award for "Spectrum" novel
2003	"Interpresscon"	"Bronze snail" award in the nomination "Major form" for "Spectrum" novel
2003	"Interpresscon"	"Interpresscon" award in the nomination "Major form" for "Spectrum" novel
2003	"EuroCon-2003"	Sergey Lukyanenko admitted as the best Europe author
2003	"Star Bridge"	"Gold Kladutsey" award in the nomination "Major form" for "Spectrum" novel
2004	"Star Bridge"	"Gold Kladutsey" award in the nomination "Serials and sequels" for "Twilight Watch" novel
2005	"Ruscon"	"SF writer of the year"
2008	"Kurd Lasswitz Preis"	Foreign novel for "Spectrum"
2010	"Phantastik Preis"	Foreign novel for "Knights of Forty Islands"

== Footnotes ==
Preceded by Valerio Evangelisti	ESFS award for Best Author; 2003	Succeeded by Nick Perumov
