= Yevgeny Yevtushenko =

Soviet and Russian poet (1933–2017)

- Евгений Евтушенко
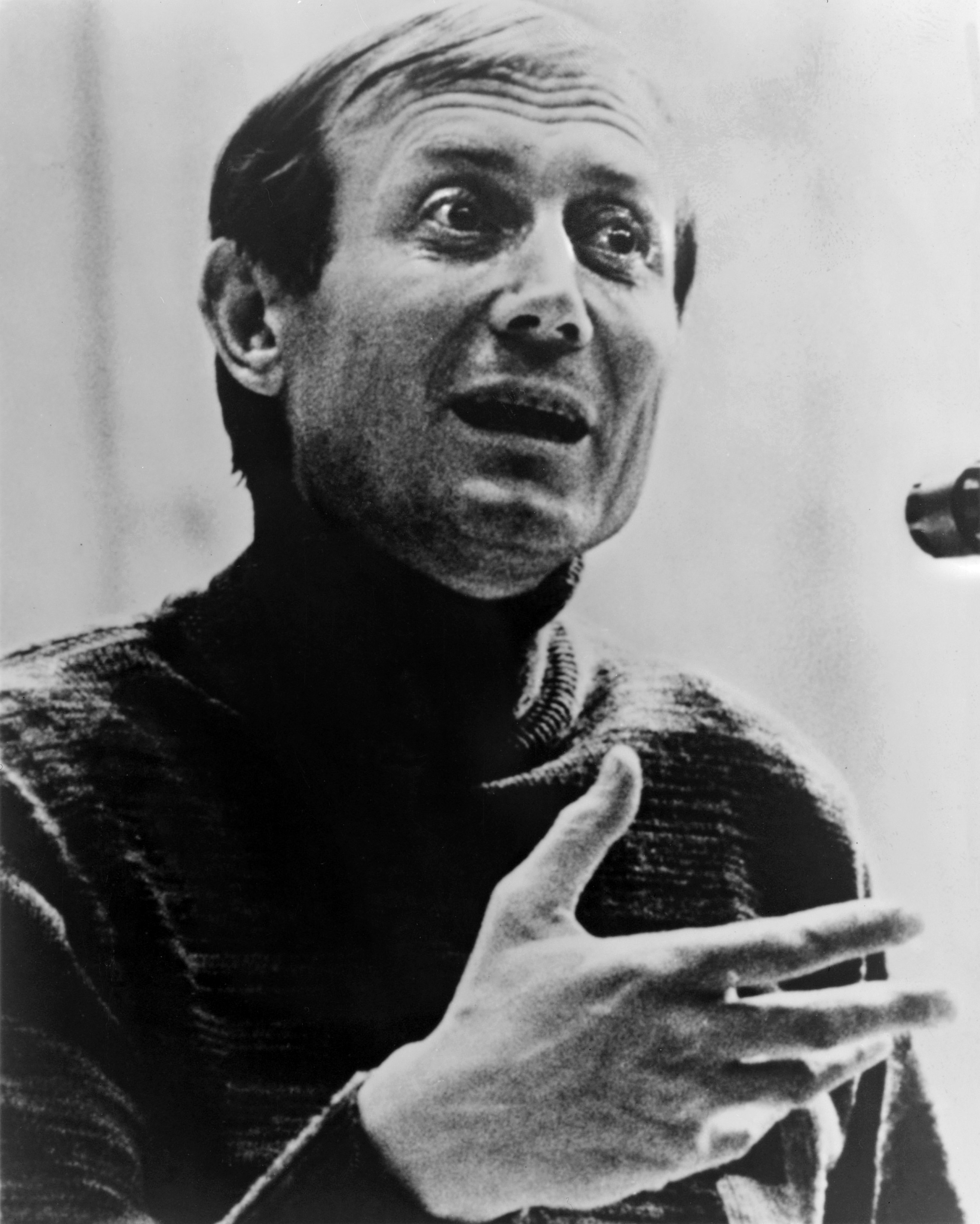
- Yevtushenko in c. 1979
- Born: Yevgeny Aleksandrovich Gangnus; 18 July 1933; Zima, Irkutsk Oblast, Russian SFSR, Soviet Union
- Died: 1 April 2017 (aged 83); Tulsa, Oklahoma, US
- Education: Maxim Gorky Literature Institute
- Occupations: Poet; writer; film director; publisher
- Children: 5, including Sasha
- Writing career
- Period: 1949–2017
- Genre: Poetry
- Notable work: Babi Yar
- Movement: Sixtiers
- Yevgeny Yevtushenko's voice Yevgeny Yevtushenko on the Echo of Moscow program, 14 July 2009
- Website: www.evtushenko.net

Signature
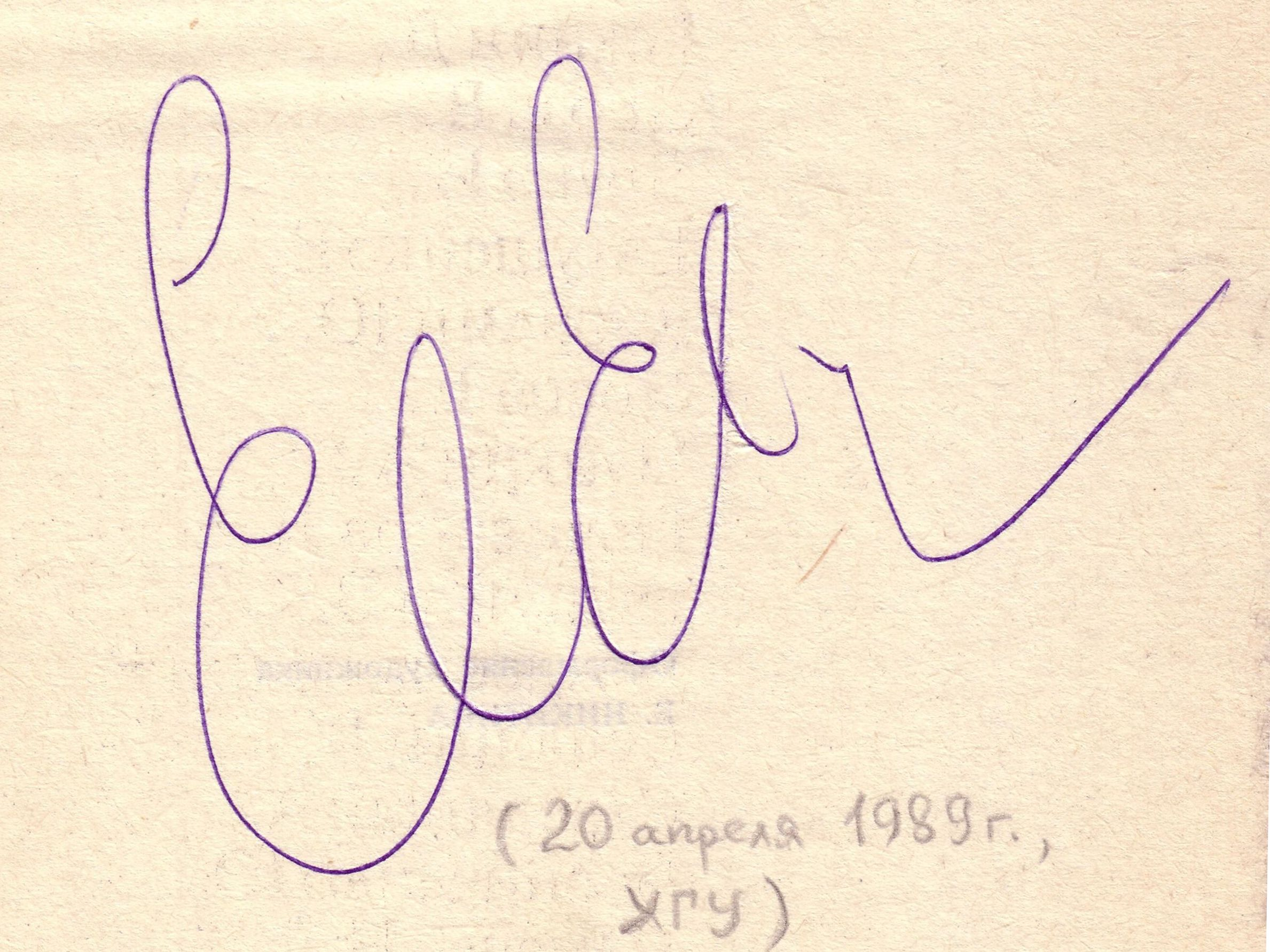

Yevgeny Aleksandrovich Yevtushenko (Russian: Евгений Александрович Евтушенко; 18 July 1933 – 1 April 2017) was a Soviet and Russian poet, novelist, essayist, dramatist, screenwriter, publisher, actor, editor, university professor, and director of several films.

== Biography ==
=== Early life ===
Yevtushenko was born Yevgeny Aleksandrovich Gangnus (he later took his mother's last name, Yevtushenko) in Irkutsk Oblast of Siberia in a small town called Zima on 18 July 1933 to a peasant family of noble descent. He had Russian, Baltic German, Ukrainian, Polish, Belarusian, and Tatar roots. His maternal great-grandfather Joseph Baikovsky belonged to szlachta, while his wife was of Ukrainian descent. They were exiled to Siberia after a peasant rebellion headed by Joseph. One of their daughters – Maria Baikovskaya – married Ermolai Naumovich Yevtushenko who was of Belarusian descent. He served as a soldier in the Imperial Army during World War I and as an officer in the Red Army during the Civil War. His paternal ancestors were Germans who moved to the Russian Empire in 1767. His grandfather Rudolph Gangnus, a math teacher of Baltic German descent, married Anna Plotnikova of Russian nobility. Both of Yevtushenko's grandfathers were arrested during Stalin's purges as "enemies of the people" in 1937.

Yevtushenko's father, Aleksandr Rudolfovich Gangnus, was a geologist, as was his mother, Zinaida Ermolaevna Yevtushenko, who later became a singer. The boy accompanied his father on geological expeditions to Kazakhstan in 1948, and to Altai, Siberia, in 1950. Young Yevtushenko wrote his first verses and humorous chastushki while living in Zima, Siberia. His parents were divorced when he was 7 and he was raised by his mother. By age 10, he had composed his first poem. Six years later a sports journal was the first periodical to publish his poetry. At 19, he published his first book of poems, The Prospects of the Future.

After the Second World War, Yevtushenko moved to Moscow and from 1951 to 1954 studied at the Gorky Institute of Literature in Moscow, from which he dropped out. In 1952, he joined the Union of Soviet Writers after publication of his first collection of poetry. His early poem So mnoyu vot chto proiskhodit ("That's what is happening to me") became a very popular song, performed by actor-songwriter Alexander Dolsky. In 1955, Yevtushenko wrote a poem about the Soviet borders being an obstacle in his life. His first important publication was the 1956 poem Stantsiya Zima ("Zima Station"). In 1957, he was expelled from the Literary Institute for "individualism". He was once labeled "the head of the intellectual juvenile delinquents" whose poems were "pygmy spittle". He was banned from travelling but gained wide popularity with the Soviet public. His early work also drew praise from Boris Pasternak, Carl Sandburg and Robert Frost.

=== During the Khrushchev Thaw ===
Yevtushenko was one of the authors politically active during the Khrushchev Thaw. In 1961, he wrote what would become perhaps his most famous poem, Babiyy Yar, in which he denounced the Soviet distortion of historical fact regarding the Nazi massacre of the Jewish population of Kyiv in September 1941, as well as the anti-Semitism still widespread in the Soviet Union. The usual Soviet policy in relation to the Holocaust in Russia was to describe it as general atrocities against Soviet citizens and to avoid mentioning that it was a genocide of the Jews. However, Yevtushenko's work Babiyy Yar "spoke not only of the Nazi atrocities, but the Soviet government's own persecution of Jewish people." The poem was published in a major newspaper, Literaturnaya Gazeta, achieved widespread circulation in numerous copies, and later was set to music, together with four other Yevtushenko poems, by Dmitri Shostakovich in his Thirteenth Symphony, subtitled Babi Yar. Of Yevtushenko's work, Shostakovich has said, "Morality is a sister of conscience. And perhaps God is with Yevtushenko when he speaks of conscience. Every morning, in place of prayers, I reread or repeat by memory two poems by Yevtushenko: 'Career' or 'Boots'."

After the 22nd Congress of the Communist Party of the Soviet Union in October 1961 – at which the former dictator Joseph Stalin was denounced in public for crimes committed in the 1930s, Yevtushenko was allowed to join the editorial board of the journal Yunost, and in October 1962 was sent to Cuba as a correspondent of Pravda. In 1962, knowing that there was backlash against the anti-Stalin campaign, Yevtushenko wrote Nasledniki Stalina (The Heirs of Stalin), in which he stated that although Stalin was dead, Stalinism and its legacy still dominated the country; in the poem he also directly addressed the Soviet government, imploring them to make sure that Stalin would "never rise again". The poem also taunted neo-Stalinists for being out of touch with the times, saying "No wonder they suffer heart attacks." It was well known that Khrushchev's most dangerous rival, Frol Kozlov had recently had a heart attack. Yevtushenko wrote in his memoirs that he sent a copy of the poem to Khrushchev, who approved its publication. Published originally in Pravda on 21 October 1962, the poem was not republished until a quarter of a century later, in the times of the comparatively liberal Party leader Mikhail Gorbachev.

In January 1963, he began a tour of West Germany and France, and while he was in Paris, arranged for his Precocious Autobiography to be serialised in L'Express. This created a scandal in Moscow. In February, he was ordered to return to the USSR and at the end of March he was accused by the writer G. A. Zhukov of an 'act of treason' and in April another writer, Vladimir Fedorov, proposed that he be expelled from the Writers' Union. No official action was taken against him, but he was barred from travelling abroad for several years.

Yevtushenko became one of the best known poets of the 1950s and 1960s in the Soviet Union. He was part of the 1960s generation, which included such writers as Vasily Aksyonov, Andrei Voznesensky, Bella Akhmadulina, Robert Rozhdestvensky, Anatoly Gladilin; as well as actors Andrei Mironov, Aleksandr Zbruyev, Natalya Fateyeva, and many others. During the time, Anna Akhmatova, a number of whose family members suffered under the communist rule, criticised Yevtushenko's aesthetic ideals and his poetics. The poet Victor Krivulin quoted her, saying that "Yevtushenko doesn't rise above an average newspaper satirist's level. Yevtushenko and Andrei Voznesensky's works just don't do it for me, therefore neither of them exists for me as a poet."

Alternatively, Yevtushenko was much respected by others at the time both for his poetry and his political stance toward the Soviet government. "Dissident Pavel Litvinov had said that '[Yevtushenko] expressed what my generation felt. Then we left him behind.'" Between 1963 until 1965, for example, Yevtushenko, already an internationally recognised littérateur, was banned from travelling outside the Soviet Union. In 1963, he was nominated for the Nobel Prize in Literature for his poem Babiyy Yar.

Generally, however, Yevtushenko was still the most extensively travelled Soviet poet, possessing an amazing capability to balance between moderate criticism of the Soviet regime, which gained him popularity in the West, and, as noted by some, a strong Marxist–Leninist ideological stance, which allegedly proved his loyalty to Soviet authorities.

At that time, KGB Chairman Vladimir Semichastny and the next KGB Chairman Yuri Andropov reported to the Communist Politburo on the "Anti-Soviet activity of poet Yevtushenko." Nevertheless, some nicknamed Yevtushenko "Zhenya Gapon," comparing him to Father Georgy Gapon, a Russian priest who at the time of the Revolution of 1905 was both a leader of rebellious workers and a secret police agent.

=== Controversy ===
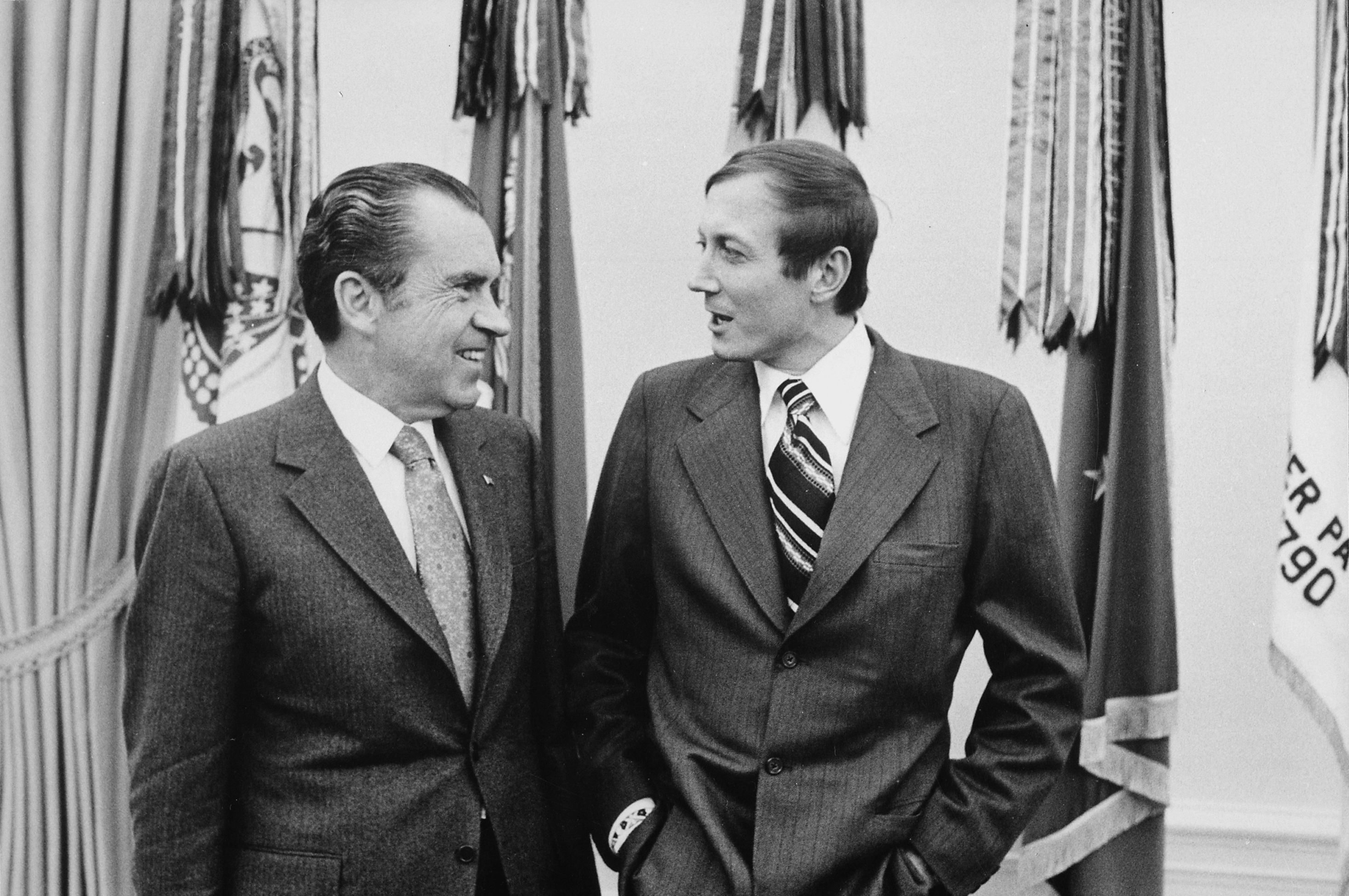
Yevtushenko (right) with US President Richard Nixon, 1972

In 1965, Yevtushenko joined Anna Akhmatova, Korney Chukovsky, Jean-Paul Sartre and others and co-signed the letter of protest against the unfair trial of Joseph Brodsky as a result of the court case against him initiated by the Soviet authorities. He subsequently co-signed a letter against the Warsaw Pact invasion of Czechoslovakia in 1968.

Nevertheless, "when, in 1987, Yevtushenko was made an honorary member of the American Academy of Arts and Letters, Brodsky himself led a flurry of protest, accusing Yevtushenko of duplicity and claiming that Yevtushenko's criticism of the Soviet Union was launched only in the directions approved by the Party and that he criticised what was acceptable to the Kremlin, when it was acceptable to the Kremlin, while soaking up adulation and honours as a fearless voice of dissent." Further, of note is "Yevtushenko's protest of the trial of Andrei Sinyavsky and Yuli Daniel, an event now credited with inaugurating the modern dissident movement and readying the national pulse for perestroika. Both writers had toiled under pseudonyms and stood accused, in 1966, of "anti-Soviet activity" for the views espoused by their fictional characters. But Yevtushenko's actual position was that the writers were guilty, only punished too severely." "Yevtushenko was not among the authors of the "Letter of the 63" who protested [their convictions]."

On 23 August 1968, Yevtushenko sent a telegram to the Soviet prime minister Alexei Kosygin lamenting the invasion of Czechoslovakia, but "when Yevtushenko was nominated for the poetry chair at Oxford in 1968, Kingsley Amis, Bernard Levin, and the Russian-Hungarian historian Tibor Szamuely led the campaign against him, arguing that he had made life difficult for his fellow Soviet writers."

=== Films ===
He was filmed as himself during the 1950s as a performing poet-actor. Yevtushenko contributed lyrics to several Soviet films and contributed to the script of Soy Cuba (I Am Cuba, 1964), a Soviet propaganda film. His acting career began with the leading role in Vzlyot (Take-Off, 1979) by director Savva Kulish, where he played the leading role as Russian rocket scientist Konstantin Tsiolkovsky. Yevtushenko also made two films as a writer/director. His film Detsky Sad (Kindergarten, 1983) and his last film, Pokhorony Stalina (Stalin's Funeral, 1990) deal with life in the Soviet Union.

=== Gorbachev era and Post-Soviet period ===
In 1989, Yevtushenko was elected as a representative for Kharkiv in the Soviet Parliament (Congress of People's Deputies), where he was a member of the pro-democratic group supporting Mikhail Gorbachev. In 1991, he supported Boris Yeltsin, as the latter defended the parliament of the Russian Federation during the hardline coup that sought to oust Gorbachev and reverse "perestroika". Later, however, when Yeltsin sent tanks into restive Chechnya, Yevtushenko reportedly "denounced his old ally and refused to accept an award from him."

In the post-Soviet era, Yevtushenko actively discussed environmental issues, confronted Russian Nationalist writers from the alternative Union of the Writers of Russia, and campaigned for the preservation of the memory of victims of Stalin's Gulag. In 1995, he published his huge anthology of contemporary Russian poetry entitled Verses of the Century.

=== In the West ===
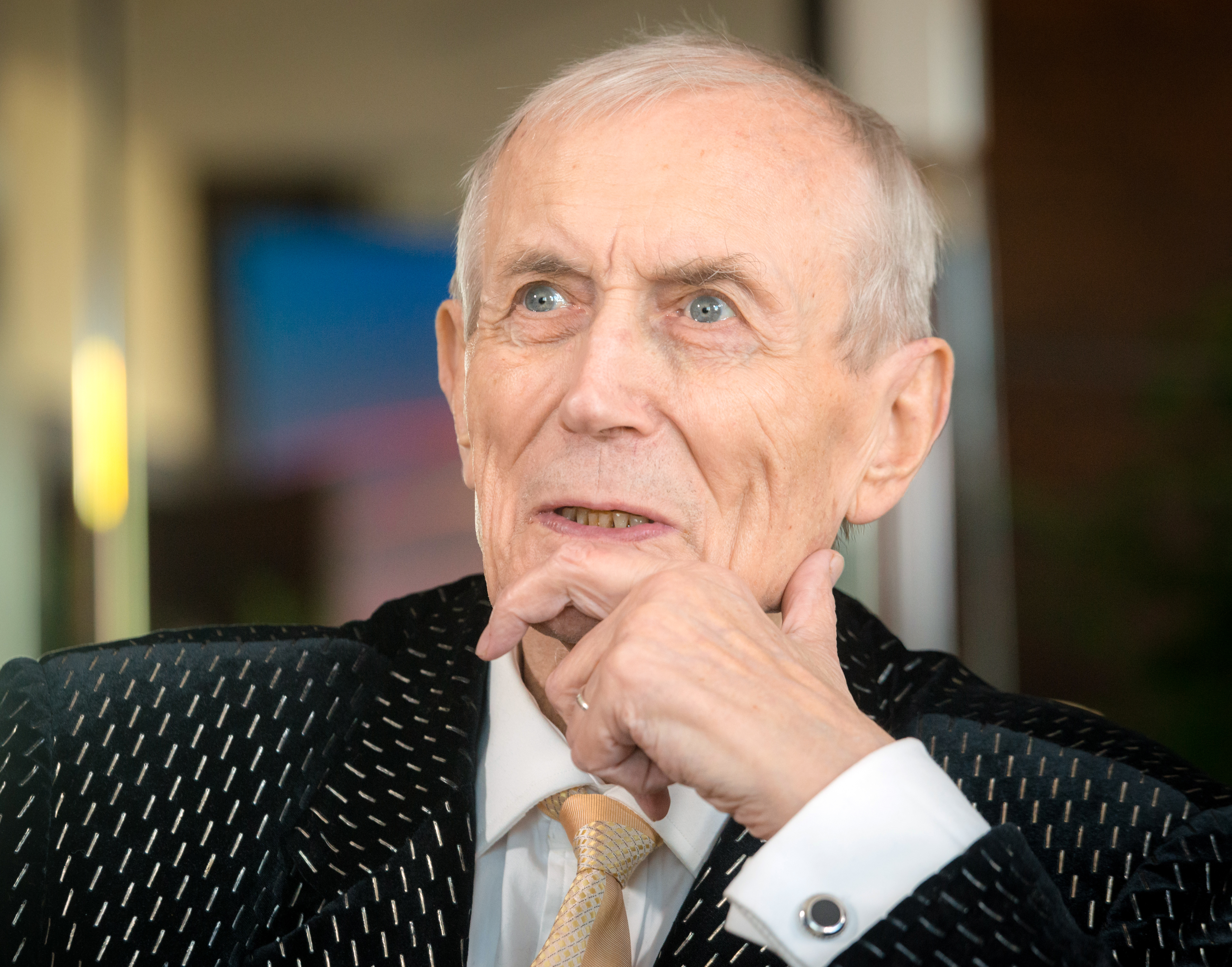
Yevtushenko in 2015

After October 2007, Yevtushenko divided his time between Russia and the United States, teaching Russian and European poetry and the history of world cinema at the University of Tulsa in Oklahoma and at Queens College of the City University of New York as well as at Florida Atlantic University. In a 1995 interview, he said, "I like very much the University of Tulsa. My students are sons of ranchers, even cowboys, oil engineers. They are different people, but they are very gifted. They are closer to Mother Nature than the big city. They are more sensitive."

In the West, he was best known for his criticism of the Soviet bureaucracy and appeals for getting rid of the legacy of Stalin. He was working on a three-volume collection of 11th to 20th-century Russian poetry and planned a novel based on his time in Havana during the Cuban Missile Crisis (he was, reportedly, good friends with Che Guevara, Salvador Allende and Pablo Neruda).

In October 2007, he was an artist-in-residence with the College of Arts and Humanities at the University of Maryland, College Park, and recited his poem Babi Yar before a performance of Dmitri Shostakovich's Symphony No. 13 by the University of Maryland Symphony Orchestra. The first time that the two works that Shostakovich set to Yevtushenko texts were performed on the same program, was in 1998 at the University of Houston's Moores School of Music, under the baton of Franz Anton Krager, with Yevtushenko present. The performance was the idea of the then-President of the Moores School of Music Society, Philip Berquist, a long-time friend of Yevtushenko, after the poet informed him that the two works had never been performed together. Yevtushenko had told Berquist that Leonard Bernstein had wanted to do so, but it never came to realisation.

The first translation of Yevtushenko's poetry into English was Yevtushenko: Selected Poems, a translation by Robin Milner-Gulland and Peter Levi published in 1962.

== Criticism ==
Michael Weiss, writing in The New York Sun in 2008, asserted that "Yevtushenko's politics have always been a complicated mixture of bravery, populism, and vulgar accommodation with dictatorship." Judith Colp of The Washington Times, for example, described Yevtushenko as "his country's most controversial modern poet, a man whose reputation is poised between courageous behind-the-scenes reformer and failed dissident." Indeed, "as the Sovietologist and literary critic Robert Conquest put it in a 1974 profile: 'The writers who had briefly flourished [under Khrushchev's thaw] went two different ways. Solzhenitsyn and his like into silenced opposition; Yevtushenko and his like, sometimes reluctantly, sometimes in the hope of still influencing matters a little, into well-rewarded collaboration.'" Some argue that before the appearance of Aleksandr Solzhenitsyn, Andrei Sakharov, and the dissident movement in the Soviet Union, Yevtushenko, through his poetry, was the first voice to speak out against Stalinism (although Boris Pasternak is often considered "to have helped give birth to the dissident movement with the publication of his Doctor Zhivago"). Colp adds: "Sovietologist Stephen Cohen of Princeton University contends that Yevtushenko was among those Soviets who didn't become dissidents but in their own way tried to improve conditions and prepare the way for reform, [saying that] 'They exhibited a kind of civic courage that many Americans didn't recognize.'" Kevin O'Connor, in his Intellectuals and Apparatchiks, noted that Yevtushenko was "a popular liberal who never experienced the sort of intimidation that characterized regime's treatment of dissident writers Aleksandr Solzhenitsyn and Vladimir Voinovich (each of whom was forced to leave the USSR)."

The exile poet Joseph Brodsky repeatedly criticised Yevtushenko for what he perceived as his "conformism", especially after the latter was made a member of the American Academy of Arts and Letters. Commenting on this controversy in A Night in the Nabokov Hotel, an anthology of Russian poetry in English translation, Anatoly Kudryavitsky wrote that "A few Russian poets enjoyed virtual pop-star status, unthinkable if transposed to other parts of Europe. In reality, they were far from any sort of protest against Soviet totalitarianism and therefore could not be regarded as anything else but naughty children of the regime." Furthermore, some criticised Yevtushenko regarding Pasternak's widow, given that "when Pasternak's widow, Olga Ivinskaya, was imprisoned on trumped-up charges of illegally dealing in foreign currency, Yevtushenko publicly maligned her [and added] that Doctor Zhivago was not worth publishing in the Soviet Union." Brodsky once said of Yevtushenko, "He throws stones only in directions that are officially sanctioned and approved."

Moreover, "the poet Irina Ratushinskaya, upon her release from prison and arrival in the West, dismissed Yevtushenko as an official poet and the novelist Vasily Aksyonov has also refused contact [with Yevtushenko]." Responding to the criticism, Yevtushenko reportedly said:

Who could sanction me to write Babi Yar, or my protests against the (1968) Soviet invasion of Czechoslovakia? Only I criticised Khrushchev to his face; not even Solzhenitsyn did that. It is only the envy of people who couldn't stand against the propaganda machine, and they invented things about my generation, the artists of the '60s. Our generation was breaking the Iron Curtain. It was a generation crippled by history, and most of our dreams were doomed to be unfulfilled – but the fight for freedom was not in vain.

Yevtushenko further notes that "in several cases [he] personally rose to the defense of these writers, interceding privately for Ratushinskaya's release from prison, defending Aksyonov and others who were expelled from the Writers' Union."

Critics differ on the stature of Yevtushenko in the literary world. Yevtushenko's defenders point to how much he did to oppose the Stalin legacy, his animus fueled by the knowledge that both of his grandfathers had perished in Stalin's purges of the 1930s. He was expelled from his university in 1956 for joining the defense of a banned novel, Vladimir Dudintsev's Not by Bread Alone. He refused to join in the official campaign against Boris Pasternak, the author of Doctor Zhivago and the recipient of the 1958 Nobel Prize in Literature. Yevtushenko denounced the invasion of Czechoslovakia in 1968; interceded with the KGB chief, Yuri Andropov, on behalf of another Nobel laureate, Aleksandr Solzhenitsyn; and opposed the Soviet invasion of Afghanistan in 1979."

== Personal life and death ==
Yevtushenko was known for his many alleged liaisons. Yevtushenko was married four times: in 1954, he married Bella Akhmadulina, who published her first collection of poems in 1962. After divorce, he married Galina Sokol-Lukonina. Yevtushenko's third wife was English translator Jan Butler (married in 1978), and his fourth Maria Novikova, whom he married in 1986. He had five sons: Dmitry, Sasha, Pyotr, Anton and Yevgeny. His wife taught Russian at Edison Preparatory School in Tulsa, Oklahoma. Yevtushenko himself spent half the year at the University of Tulsa, lecturing on poetry and European cinema.

Yevtushenko died on the morning of 1 April 2017, at the Hillcrest Medical Center in Tulsa. His widow, Maria Novikova, reported that he died peacefully in his sleep of heart failure. His son Yevgeny reported that Yevtushenko had been diagnosed with cancer about six years before and that he had undergone surgery to remove part of a kidney, but the disease had recently returned. "His wife, Maria Novikova, and their two sons, Dmitry and Yevgeny, were reportedly with him when he died." Following his death, Yevtushenko was described by his friend and translator Robin Milner-Gulland as "an absolute natural talent at performance" on BBC Radio 4's Last Word programme. Milner-Gulland also wrote, in an obituary in The Guardian, that "there was a brief stage when the development of Russian literature seemed almost synonymous with his name", and that amidst his characteristics of "sharpness, sentiment, populism, self-confidence and sheer enjoyment of the sound of language", he was "above all a generous spirit". Raymond H. Anderson stated in The New York Times that his "defiant" poetry "inspired a generation of young Russians in their fight against Stalinism during the Cold War".

== Awards and honours ==
In 1962, Yevtushenko was featured on the cover of Time magazine. In 1993, he received a medal as 'Defender of Free Russia,' which was given to those who took part in resisting the hard-line Communist coup in August 1991. In July 2000 the Russian Academy of Sciences named a star in his honour. In 2001, his childhood home in Zima Junction, Siberia, was restored and opened as a permanent museum of poetry. Yevtushenko received in 1991 the American Liberties Medallion, the highest honour conferred by the American Jewish Committee. He was made a Laureate of the International Botev Prize, in Bulgaria in 2006. In 2007, he was awarded the Ovid Prize, Romania, in recognition of his body of work.

- Order of the Badge of Honour (1967)
- Order of the Red Banner of Labour (1983)
- "Frudzheno-81" (Italy), "SIMBA Academy" in 1984 (Italy)
- USSR State Prize (1984) – for the poem "Mother and Neutron Bomb"
- Order of Friendship of Peoples (offered in 1993, but refused in protest against the war in Chechnya)
- Tsarskoselskaya art prize (2003)
- Honorary Citizen of the city of Petrozavodsk (2006)
- Honorary Doctor of Petrozavodsk State University (2007)
- Commander of the Order of Bernardo O'Higgins (Chile, 2009)
- State Prize of the Russian Federation (2010)
- Honorary Member of the Russian Academy of Arts
- Order "For Merit to the Fatherland", 3rd class
- "Golden Chain of the Commonwealth" (2011)- the highest award of the NGO "Russian-speaking community of creators"
- The Russian national "The Poet" award (2013)
- Honorary Citizen of Irkutsk Region (2015) – for meritorious service, creative activities contributing to raising the profile of the Irkutsk region of the Russian Federation and abroad
- Honorary Doctor of Irkutsk State University (2015)
- Order of the "Polar Star" (2016) – for outstanding achievements in the field of literature and arts
- 2015 – China International Prize "Chzhunkun" ( Chin. Ex. 中坤国际诗歌奖, pinyin : Zhōngkūn guójì shīgē jiǎng ) for his outstanding contribution to the world of poetry
- 2007, on the initiative of the World Congress of Russian Jews (WCRJ), nominated for the Nobel Prize for Literature in 2008 for the poem "Babi Yar"
- 22 January 2005 in Turin, the Italian literary award Grinzane Cavour (Yevtushenko was awarded the Premio of Grinzane Cavour ) – for their ability to convey the eternal themes by means of literature, especially to the younger generation"
- Honorary Member of the Royal Spanish Academy and of the American Academy of Arts and Letters
- The Boccaccio Prize (Italy) – for the best foreign novel
- The Golden Lion International Prize (Venice)
- The Grinzane Cavour Prize (22 January 2005, Turin, Italy) – "for his ability to convey the eternal themes of the means of literature, especially to the younger generation"
- Professor at the University of Pittsburgh, University of Santo Domingo and the University of Tulsa
- An asteroid 4234 Evtushenko was named after him in 1994
- On July 18, 2010, Yevgeny Yevtushenko opened a museum-gallery in Peredelkino, near Moscow. The museum displays the poet's personal collection of paintings, sculptures, photographs, and posters, as well as his memorabilia. Later, the poet's collection was donated to the Russian Federation, becoming the exhibition department of the Museum of Contemporary History of Russia

== Bibliography ==
- Razvedchiki Griadushchego ("The Prospectors of the Future"), 1952
- Treti Sneg ("The Third Snow"), 1955
- Shosse Entuziastov ("Highway of the Enthusiasts"), 1956
- Stantsiia Zima ("Winter Station"), 1956
- Obeshchanie ("Promise"), 1957
- Dve Liubimykh ("Two Beloved Ones"), 1958
- Luk I Lira ("A Bow and a Lyra"), 1959
- Stikhi Raznykh Let ("Poems of Several Years"), 1959
- Chetvertaia Meshchanskaia ("Four Vulgar Women"), 1959
- Iabloko ("The Apple"), 1960
- Red Cats, 1961
- Baby Yar ("Babi Yar"), 1961
- Posle Stalina ("After Stalin"), 1962
- Vzmach Ruki, 1962
- Selected Poems London: Penguin, 1962
- Nezhnost': Novye Stikni ("Tenderness: New Poems"), 1962
- Nasledniki Stalina ("The Heirs of Stalin"), 1963
- Autobiografia ("A Precocious Autobiography"), 1963
- Selected Poetry, 1963
- Soy Cuba, 1964 (screenplay with Enrique Pineda Barbet)
- The Poetry of Yevgeny Yevtusenko, 1964
- Khochu Ia Stat' Nemnozhko Straromodym ("I Want to Become a Bit Old-Fashioned"), 1964
- Americanci, gde vash president ("Americans, Where is your President?"), 1964
- Bratskaya Ges ("The Bratsk Station"), 1965
- Khotiat Li Russkie Voiny? ("Want the Russian Wars?"), 1965
- Poems, 1966
- Yevtusenko Poems, 1966
- Yevtusenko's Reader: The Spirit of Elbe, a Precocious Autobiography, Poems, 1966
- Kater Zviazi ("The Zvyazi Boat"), 1966
- Kachka ("Swing-Boat"), 1966
- The Execution of Stepan Razin, Op. 119, 1966 (score by Dmitri Shostakovich, 1966
- Poems Chosen by the Author, 1966
- The City of the Yes and the City of the No and Other Poems, 1966
- So Mnoiu Vot Chto Proiskhodit ("This is what is happening to me"), 1966
- New Works: the Bratsk Station, 1966
- Stikhi ("Poems"), 1967
- New Poems, 1968
- Tramvai Poezii ("Train of Poetry"), 1968
- Tiaga Val'dshnepov ("The Pull of the Woodcocks"), 1968
- Bratskaia Ges ("The Bratsk Station"), 1968
- Idut Belye Snegi ("The White Snow Is Falling"), 1969
- Flowers and Bullets, and Freedom to Kill, 1970
- Kazanskii Universitet ("Kazan University and Other New Poems"), 1971
- Ia Sibirskoi Porody ("I'm of Siberian Stock"), 1971
- Doroka Nomen Odin ("Highway Number One"), 1972
- Stolen Apples: His Own Selection of his Best Work. W. H. Allen, 1972
- Izbrannye Proizvedeniia, 2 vols., 1975
- Poiushchaia Damba ("The Singing Dam"), 1972
- Under the Skin of the Statue of Liberty, play, 1982
- Poet V Rossii – Bol'she, Chem Poet ("A Poet in Russia Is more than a Poet"), 1973
- Intimnaia Lirika ("Intimate Lyrics"), 1973
- Ottsovskii Slukh ("Paternal Hearing"), 1975
- Izbrannye Proizvedeniia ("Selected Works"), 2 vols., 1975
- Proseka ("The Glade"), 1976
- Spasibo ("Thankyou"), 1976
- From Desire to Desire, 1976 (UK: Love Poems)
- V Polnyi Rost ("At Full Growth"), 1977
- Zaklinanie ("A Spell"), 1977
- Utrennyi Narod ("The Morning Crowds"), 1978
- Prisiaga Prostoru ("An Oath to Space"), 1978
- Kompromiss Kompromissovich ("Compromise of Compromise"), 1978
- The Face Behind the Face, 1979
- Ivan the Terrible and Ivan the Fool, 1979
- Tiazhelee Zemli ("Heavier than Earth"), 1979
- Kogda Muzhchine Sorok Let ("When a Man Is 40"), 1979
- Doroka, Ukhodiashchaia Vdal ("The Highway, Leaving Away"), 1979
- Svarka Vzryvom ("Wedding Explosion"), 1980
- Talent Est Chudo Nesluchainoe ("Talent Is a Miracle Coming Not by Chance"), 1980
- Tochka Opory ("Fulcrum"), 1980
- Tret'ia Pamiat ("Third Memory"), 1980
- Poslushaite Menia ("Listen to Me"), 1980
- Ardabiola, 1981
- Yagodnyye Mesta ("Wild Berries"), 1981
- Invisible Threads, 1981
- Ia Sibiriak ("I'm a Siberian"), 1981
- Sobranie Socineniy ("Collection of Works"), 1982
- A Dove in Santiago, 1982
- Dve Pary Lyzh ("Two Pairs of Skis"), 1982
- Belye Snegi ("White Snow"), 1982
- Mama I Neitronaiia Bomba I Drugie Poemy ("Mother and Neutron Bomb and Other Poems"), 1983
- Otkuda Rodom Ia ("Where I Come From"), 1983
- Voina – Eto Antikultura ("War is Anti-Culture"), 1983
- Sobranie Sochinenii ("Collected Works"), 3 vols., 1983–84
- Kindergarten, screenplay, 1984
- Fuku, 1985 – Fuku: Runoelma
- Pochti Naposledok ("Almost at the End"), 1985
- Dva Goroda (Two Towns"), 1985
- More, 1985
- Poltravinochki, 1986
- Stikhi ("Poems"), 1986
- Zavrtrashnii Veter ("Tomorrow's Wind"), 1987
- Stikhotvoreniia I Poemy 1951–1986 ("Poems and Verses"), 3 vols., 1987
- Posledniaia Popytka (The Last Attempt"), 1988
- Pochti V Poslednii Mig ("Almost at the Last Moment"), 1988
- Nezhnost ("Tenderness"), 1988
- Divided Twins: Alaska and Siberia – Razdel'ennye Bliznetsy, 1988
- Poemy O Mire ("Verses on Peace"), 1989
- Detskii sad Moscow ("Moscow Kindergarten"), Screenplay, 1989
- Stikhi ("Poems"), 1989
- Grazhdane, Poslushaite Menia... ("Citizens, Listen to Me"), 1989
- Liubimaia, Spi... ("Loved One, Sleep..."), 1989
- Detskii Sad ("Kindergarten"), 1989
- Pomozhem Svobode ("We Will Help Freedom"), 1990
- Politika Privilegiia Vsekh ("Everybody's Privilege"), 1990
- Propast – V Dva Pryzhka? ("The Precipice – In Two Leaps?"), 1990
- Fatal Half Measures, 1991
- The Collected Poems 1952–1990, 1991
- Ne Umirai Prezhde Smerti ("Don't Die Before You're Dead"), 1993
- Moe Samoe-samoe ("My Most most"), 1995
- Pre-morning. Predutro, bilingual edition, 1995
- Medlennaia Liubov ("Slow Love"), 1997
- Izbrannaia Proza ("Selected Prose"), 1998
- Volchii Pasport, 1998
- The Best of the Best: A New Book of Poetry in English and Russian, 1999
- Walk on the Ledge: A New Book of Poetry in English and Russian, 2005
- Shestidesantnik: memuarnaia proza ("Paratroopers of the 1960s: A Memoir in Prose"), 2006
