= Kindergarten (1983 film) =

1983 film directed by Yevgeny Yevtushenko

- Film poster
- Russian: Детский сад
- Directed by: Yevgeny Yevtushenko
- Written by: Yevgeny Yevtushenko
- Starring: Sergey Gusak; Galina Stakhanova; Svetlana Yevstratova; Igor Sklyar; Klaus Maria Brandauer
- Cinematography: Vladimir Papyan
- Music by: Gleb Mai
- Production company: Mosfilm
- Release date: 1983
- Running time: 146 minutes
- Country: Soviet Union
- Language: Russian

Kindergarten (Russian: Детский сад, romanized: Detskiy sad) is a Soviet drama film by Yevgeny Yevtushenko, created by him on the basis of his own memories of a military childhood.

== Plot ==
In Russia, during the Great Patriotic War, a 10-year-old boy goes to live with his grandmother. On the way to it, the train gets under bombardment, so Zhenya has to move slowly on foot to the destination, meeting many friendly and not very people.

== Cast ==
- Sergey Gusak as Zhenya
- Galina Stakhanova as Zhenya's Grandmother
- Svetlana Yevstratova as Lilya
- Igor Sklyar as Zhenya's Father
- Klaus Maria Brandauer as German officer
- Nikolai Karachentsov as thief Spire
- Leonid Markov as imaginary blind
- Yevgeny Yevtushenko as freaky chess player
- Mikhail Roshchin as episode
- Nika Turbina as episode

== Criticism ==
Yevgeny Yevtushenko's film came out in the years of the poet's disgrace, so it was not by chance that he became the subject of Soviet criticism and found recognition in the West (after an out-of-competition show at the Venice Film Festival).

The famous film critic Victor Dyomin called the picture worthless, while the film director Savva Kulish, after watching the film, praised the work of Yevtushenko, wishing him further success: Yevtushenko is trying to implement on the screen purely literary devices hence the obviously overestimated in comparison with the usual capacity in the movie capacity of plastic images, their literary type metaphorical. Sometimes this metaphoricity strikes accuracy and truth. Sometimes it seems deliberate, and then reveals a taste of literary. But before us is a clear attempt to try the film equipment on the utmost strain, and this attempt is fruitful not only for the writer, but also for the cinema.

Script writer Yevgeny Gabrilovich supported the creative search for the poet.

Aleksandr Fyodorov: All this looks pretentious, secondary and even unprofessional. But the nonprofessionality of the author of the film in the cinema, as it is paradoxical, has also positive aspects. Yevtushenko removes the picture of the memory of his military childhood so that the mosaic of events consists of many unpolished, different and unequal episodes.
