= List of films and television series featuring Robin Hood =

The following are some of the notable adaptations of the Robin Hood story in film and television.

== Robin Hood, English-language live-action films and television series ==
=== Theatrical shorts ===
- 1908: Robin Hood and His Merry Men, a silent film directed by Percy Stow, and the first appearance of Robin Hood on the screen.
- 1912: Robin Hood, a silent film starring Robert Frazer as Robin Hood.
- 1912: Robin Hood Outlawed, a British silent film starring A. Brian Plant as Robin Hood.
- 1913: Robin Hood, a silent film starring William Russell as Robin Hood.
- 1913: In the Days of Robin Hood, a British short film starring Harry Agar Lyons as Robin Hood.

=== Theatrical features ===
- 1922: Robin Hood, a silent film starring Douglas Fairbanks.
- 1938: The Adventures of Robin Hood, starring Errol Flynn as Robin Hood, his most acclaimed role, with Olivia de Havilland as Maid Marian, Eugene Pallette as Friar Tuck, Alan Hale, Sr. as Little John, Basil Rathbone as Guy of Gisborne, Claude Rains as Prince John, Patric Knowles as Will Scarlet, Melville Cooper as the Sheriff of Nottingham, and Ian Hunter as Richard I of England. Considered by many to be the best Robin Hood movie.
- 1946: The Bandit of Sherwood Forest, a film starring Cornel Wilde as Robert of Nottingham, Robin Hood's son; Robin Hood is played by Russell Hicks.
- 1948: The Prince of Thieves, a film starring Jon Hall as Robin Hood.
- 1950: Rogues of Sherwood Forest, a film starring John Derek as Robin Hood's son, Robin of Huntington.
- 1951: Tales of Robin Hood, a Robert Lippert film with Robert Clarke as Robin Hood
- 1952: The Story of Robin Hood and his Merrie Men, a feature from Walt Disney, starring Richard Todd as Robin, Joan Rice as Marian, Peter Finch as the Sheriff of Nottingham, James Hayter as Friar Tuck, James Robertson Justice as Little John, Hubert Gregg as Prince John, Elton Hayes as Alan-a-Dale, Anthony Forwood as Will Scarlet, and Patrick Barr as King Richard.
- 1954: The Men of Sherwood Forest, a Hammer Films feature starring Don Taylor as Robin.
- 1958: The Son of Robin Hood, in which the 'son' of Robin Hood, actually his daughter, is played by June Laverick.
- 1960: Sword of Sherwood Forest, a Hammer version, with Richard Greene reprising his television role.
- 1967: A Challenge for Robin Hood, a Hammer version, with Barrie Ingham as Robin Hood.
- 1969: Wolfshead: The Legend of Robin Hood, a Hammer version.
- 1969: The Erotic Adventures of Robin Hood, a softcore pornographic adaptation. Originally titled 'The Ribald Tales of Robin Hood'.
- 1973: Robin Hood, an animated musical version starring animals produced by Walt Disney Productions.
- 1976: Robin and Marian, starring Sean Connery as Robin, Audrey Hepburn as Maid Marian, Nichol Williamson as Little John and Ronnie Barker as Friar Tuck.
- 1991: Robin Hood: Prince of Thieves, starring Kevin Costner as Robin, Morgan Freeman as Azeem, Mary Elizabeth Mastrantonio as Marian, Christian Slater as Will Scarlet, Alan Rickman as the Sheriff of Nottingham, Mike McShane as Friar Tuck, Nick Brimble as Little John, and Michael Wincott as Guy of Gisbourne, with Sean Connery appearing as King Richard in the finale.
- 1991: Robin Hood, starring Patrick Bergin and Uma Thurman, a reinvention of the story pitting Robin Hood against different antagonists. The film was released theatrically in Europe, Australia and Japan, and on television on the Fox network in the United States and in South America.
- 1993: Robin Hood: Men in Tights, a film by Mel Brooks that spoofs both the 1938 and the 1991 films and recycles bits from his short-lived late-1975 Robin Hood TV sitcom When Things Were Rotten. Cary Elwes plays Robin in the movie. Richard Lewis plays Prince John while Roger Rees plays the Sheriff of Nottingham. Amy Yasbeck plays Marian, Eric Allan Kramer is Little John, and Matthew Porretta is Will Scarlet. Patrick Stewart appears in the ending, spoofing Sean Connery's take on King Richard.
- 2010: Robin Hood, a film directed by Ridley Scott and starring Russell Crowe as Robin, Cate Blanchett as Marian, Oscar Isaac as Prince John, Danny Huston as King Richard, Mark Addy as Friar Tuck, Matthew Macfadyen as the Sheriff of Nottingham, Kevin Durand as Little John, Scott Grimes as Will Scarlet, and Alan Doyle as Alan-a-Dale.
- 2018: Robin Hood, a film directed by Otto Bathurst previously titled Robin Hood: Origins, starring Taron Egerton as Robin, Jamie Foxx as Little John, Ben Mendelsohn as the Sheriff of Nottingham, Eve Hewson as Marian, Tim Minchin as Friar Tuck, Jamie Dornan as Will Scarlet, and Paul Anderson as Guy of Gisborne
- 2026: The Death of Robin Hood, directed by Michael Sarnoski, telling the story of Robin Hood (Hugh Jackman) after a life of crime and murder.
- 2026: The Uprising, directed by Paul Greengrass, depicting the 1381 Peasants' Revolt. The film bears tangential relations to the Robin Hood legend, in the form of a closing scene set in Sherwood Forest, where the unnamed protagonist (played by Andrew Garfield) leads a group of archers. The film was briefly subtitled The Rise of Robin Hood for the US release.

=== Direct-to-video features ===
- 1994: Robin Hood: Prince of Sherwood, starring Jason Braly as Robin Hood
- 2007: Splitting the Arrow, starring Calvert Tooley as Robin Hood
- 2018: Robin Hood: The Rebellion, a film directed by Nicholas Winter.

=== Television films ===
- 1968: The Legend of Robin Hood, a 90-minute American television musical, featuring the songs of Sammy Cahn and Jimmy Van Heusen. Starring David Watson as Robin Hood, and Douglas Fairbanks Jr. as King Richard.
- 1975: Robin Hood Junior, starring Keith Chegwin as a young Robin. This was spun off in 1976 into a short series, The Unbroken Arrow, with different actors.
- 1984: The Zany Adventures of Robin Hood, a made-for-TV spoof starring George Segal (Robin), Morgan Fairchild (Marian) and Roddy McDowall (Prince John).
- 2001: Princess of Thieves, a Disney-produced American made-for-TV movie, starred Keira Knightley as Robin Hood's (Stuart Wilson) heroic adolescent daughter, Gwyn, who takes over her father's role and comes to his rescue.
- 2009: Beyond Sherwood Forest, a TV movie starring Robin Dunne as Robin Hood and Erica Durance as Maid Marian
- 2022: The Adventures of Maid Marian. A TV movie focusing on Maid Marian (Sophie Craig), with Dominic Andersen playing Robin Hood.

=== Television series ===
- 1953: Robin Hood a television series on BBC Television, featured Patrick Troughton, in the first representation of Robin Hood on television.
- 1955–1959: The Adventures of Robin Hood, a long-running British series starring Richard Greene that is also remembered for its catchy theme tune.
  - 1955: Robin Hood, the Movie (compilation from the Richard Greene TV series) (1991 release, according to some sources)
  - 1956: Robin Hood's Greatest Adventures (also starring Donald Pleasence as Prince John) (compilation from the Richard Greene TV series) (1991 release, according to some sources)
  - 1958: Robin Hood: The Quest for the Crown (compilation from the Richard Greene TV series) (1991 or 1995 release, according to some sources)
- 1975: The Legend of Robin Hood, a six-episode BBC serial starring Martin Potter in the title role, Paul Darrow as the Sheriff of Nottingham and Diane Keen as Lady Marion. The adaptation was aired on public television in the USA later in the 1970s.
- 1975: When Things Were Rotten, a comedy TV series produced by Mel Brooks and starring Richard Gautier (as an imbecilic Robin Hood), Bernie Kopell and Misty Rowe.
- 1984–1986: Robin of Sherwood, a fantasy-style British television series starring Michael Praed and later Jason Connery as Robin. The series set the template for many of the adaptations that followed, most notably the introduction of a Saracen (Muslim) outlaw and the move to a grittier tone.
- 1989–1994: Maid Marian and her Merry Men, a British children's TV show, featured Kate Lonergan as Maid Marian, the dynamic leader of the resistance against Prince John. Robin was shown as her cowardly and buffoonish figurehead, with Nottingham as John's put-upon, sarcastic enforcer.
- 1997–1999: The New Adventures of Robin Hood, a French–U.S. TV series, starred Matthew Porretta as a black-leather-clad Robin in the first two seasons and John Bradley taking over the lead role in the final two seasons. The tone of the series resembled its contemporaries Hercules: The Legendary Journeys and Xena: Warrior Princess. Porretta had appeared as Will Scarlet O'Hara in Men in Tights.
- 2006–2009: Robin Hood, a BBC One television series was produced by Tiger Aspect. It was first broadcast as thirteen-episode series in the UK from October to December 2006, with a second series following in 2007, and a third in 2009. Jonas Armstrong stars in the title role.
- 2023: Robyn Hood, a Canadian series created by Director X which reimagines Robin Hood as "Robyn" (a female rapper) and "The Hood" (a masked hip-hop band) living in a working class area in the fictional city of New Nottingham and sparring with antagonists including The Sheriff and a property tycoon named John Prince.
- 2025–present: Robin Hood a television series on MGM+, starring Jack Patten as Robin Hood and Sean Bean as the Sheriff of Nottingham.

== Robin Hood in Ivanhoe, English-language live-action films and television series ==
Ivanhoe: A Romance by Walter Scott is a historical novel published in three volumes in 1819, proved to be one of the best-known and most influential of Scott's novels, so much so that it influenced popular perceptions of Robin Hood. The following adaptions of the novel feature Robin Hood:

=== Theatrical features ===
- 1913: Ivanhoe, featuring Walter Thomas as Robin Hood.
- 1952: Ivanhoe, featuring Harold Warrender as Locksley (Robin Hood).

=== Television films ===
- 1982: Ivanhoe, featuring David Robb as Robin Hood.

=== Television series ===
- 1958-1959: Ivanhoe, starring Roger Moore as Ivanhoe. Also features Emerton Court as "Sir Robert" in the episode "Arms and the Women".
- 1997: Ivanhoe, featuring Aden Gillett as Robin of Locksley.

== Robin Hood–themed parodies, English-language live-action films and television series ==
Since Robin Hood is a character in the public domain, there is no restriction on his use. Thus, he has often appeared in other films and TV series that do not revolve around the legend in strictest terms, and some other characters have played a Robin Hood-like role. or be an In others Robin Hood is interactive with other characters that originate in other TV shows and films.

=== Theatrical features and serials ===
- 1939: Mexicali Rose is an American Western film directed by George Sherman and starring Gene Autry, Smiley Burnette, and Noah Beery. Based on a story by Luci Ward and Connie Lee
- 1946: Son of the Guardsman is a serial with a period setting, in this case 12th century England. The serial is largely based on the Robin Hood legends, to the extent of including outlaws from Sherwood Forest, but it does not include or reference Robin Hood himself.
- 1952: Miss Robin Hood, a British film starring Margaret Rutherford as a modern-day female Robin Hood.
- 1963: Siege of the Saxons, a British Arthurian film starring Janette Scott as Princess Katherine (King Arthur's daughter) and Ronald Lewis as Robert Marshall, a thieving archer who proclaims he only steals from the rich. The two go on the run as outlaws and fall in love after the evil Edmund of Cornwall attempts to usurp Arthur's throne after his death.
- 1964: Robin and the 7 Hoods, a musical film set in 1930s gangster Chicago, with Frank Sinatra as "Robbo".
- 1971: Up the Chastity Belt, starring Frankie Howerd, with Hugh Paddick as Robin Hood.
- 1981: Time Bandits, starring John Cleese, Sean Connery, Shelley Duvall; written and directed by Terry Gilliam had a short spoof of the Robin Hood legend, with Robin (played by Cleese) being portrayed as an upper class twit and as a parody of Charles, Prince of Wales.
- 2025: Snow White, a live-action reimagining of Walt Disney Productions' 1937 animated film Snow White and the Seven Dwarfs, which itself is based on the 1812 fairy tale "Snow White" by the Brothers Grimm, starring Rachel Zegler, Andrew Burnap, and Gal Gadot; directed by Marc Webb from a screenplay by Greta Gerwig and Erin Cressida Wilson, with Rachel Zegler as Snow White (a young princess; the "Fairest One of All") and Andrew Burnap as Jonathan (Robin Hood-esque hero), a courageous and rebellious commoner who aids the desperate people who suffer under the Queen's reign.

=== Television series ===
- 1963: "Opie and His Merry Men", an episode of The Andy Griffith Show: A hobo tells Opie Taylor and his friends stories about Robin Hood and encourages them to emulate him.
- 1966: Art Carney played the supervillain The Archer, who was based on Robin Hood, in season 2 of Batman ("Shoot a Crooked Arrow" and "Walk the Straight and Narrow", 1966).
- 1968: In The Time Tunnel episode "The Revenge of Robin Hood", the former outlaw is the Earl of Huntington who gets King John to sign the Magna Carta.
- 1970: A 1970s Muppet skit from Sesame Street featured Ernie as Robin Hood, auditioning new recruits for his Merry Men, including Harvey Kneeslapper.
- 1970: The Muppet Show did their version of Robin Hood for one episode with Kermit the Frog as the titular character, Fozzie Bear as Little John, Gonzo the Great as the Sheriff of Nottingham with guest star Lynn Redgrave as Maid Marian. The show takes an unusual twist mid-way when Miss Piggy, jealous that Redgrave is the leading lady instead of her (gets a consolation role as "Sister Tuck" as opposed to Friar Tuck), kidnaps her, locks her up in her dressing room and unsuccessfully takes her place during the rescue scene, to which Kermit and his Merry Men end up saving the real Maid Marian (Lynn Redgrave).
- 1973: Dennis Moore is a sketch that appears in "Dennis Moore," the thirty-seventh episode of Monty Python's Flying Circus. Dennis Moore is a Highwayman who steals 'Lupins' from the rich and gives them to the poor, once the rich become poor and the poor become rich and pompous, he steals the 'lupins' from the poor, returning them to the rich.

The melody for the Dennis Moore song is taken from a song originally about Robin Hood ("Robin Hood, Robin Hood, Riding through the glen...").

- 1982: Voyagers! (TV series) (Episode 10 "An Arrow Pointing East" aired 12 December 1982) Voyagers Jon-Erik Hexum (Phineas Bogg) and Meeno Peluce (Jeffrey Jones) help Robin Hood played by Dan Hamilton sneak into an archery competition to rescue Maid Marian.
- 1991: Star Trek: The Next Generation episode "Qpid" features the crew being forced to play out a real-Robin Hood tale (Captain Picard, played by Patrick Stewart, as Robin Hood) when Q recreates it.
- 1995: The Sliders episode "Prince of Wails" is set in an alternate history where Great Britain successfully suppressed the American Revolution. The plot of the episode broadly follows the story of Robin Hood, with the British States of America being a heavily taxed and oppressed corner of the British Empire, the villain (an alternate version of Maximillian Arturo) being styled as the Sheriff of San Francisco but serving as a viceroy, and Quinn Mallory and the revolutionary Oakland Raiders serving as Robin Hood and his Merry Men (particularly after adopting the tactic of stealing from the rich and giving to the poor).
- 1996: Wishbone plays Robin Hood in the episode "Paw Prints of Thieves", to portray Joe's fight to give leftover food to a homeless shelter, even if it is against regulations.
- 1996: Robin of Locksley, a made-for-TV movie starring Devon Sawa as a modern teenage Robin attending a prep school with the snobbish John Prince, played by Joshua Jackson. Set in modern times.
- 1999: The Blackadder Millennium Special Back & Forth featured Robin Hood much like the recurring character Lord Flashheart, with similar boisterous personas and played by the same actor (Rik Mayall), with Kate Moss as Maid Marian. In his role, he proclaims his Merry Men have "strong muscle tone and are not gay!" though his Merry Men later betray and kill him after a time-travelling Blackadder convinced them that their purpose of stealing from the rich and giving to the poor is ultimately pathetic.
- 1999: Back to Sherwood, a children's series featuring a teenage descendant of Robin ("Robyn Hood") who discovers she has the power to travel back in time, and joins with the children of her ancestor's band (Joan Little, Phil Scarlet, etc.).
- 2005: Charmed episode 7.14, "Carpe Demon", an ex-demon named Drake uses his powers to turn himself and the sisters into Robin Hood, Maid Marion, and Robin's merry men. A sorcerer casts a spell on Drake making him believe that he is Robin Hood and that Phoebe is Maid Marion.
- 2007: Chucklevision episode 19.6 "Sherwood Chuckle": the Chuckle Brothers join Robin Hood and his merry men and set out to save Maid Marion from the Sheriff of Nottingham.
- 2001–2006: Last of the Summer Wine: Billy Hardcastle often claims himself as being a 'direct descendant of Robin Hood'.
- 2011–2018: Once Upon a Time, an ABC television series based on major Disney animated films. Robin Hood appears as a recurring character, where he is played first by Tom Ellis in Season Two and later Sean Maguire starting in Season Three. In Season Six, Maguire plays a different version of the character who follows Regina home from a fantasy world.
- 2013: In Once Upon a Time in Wonderland: Robin Hood (played as above by Maguire) appears in the "Forget Me Not" episode of the series in which Will Scarlett joins the Merry Men. Scarlett is the real name of "The Knave", a lead character in the Wonderland series.
- 2013: Series 3 of Gigglebiz introduced Will Singalot (played by Justin Fletcher like many other characters in the series) who was the minstrel of Robin Hood (played by Tom Golding). Will would always constantly sing and spoil Robin's plans to impress Maid Marian (played by Ellie Kirk).
- 2014: In Doctor Who, Robin Hood appears in the third episode of eighth series, "Robot of Sherwood" by Mark Gatiss, played by actor Tom Riley.
- 2015: Though never having made an appearance, Robin Hood is mentioned in the Arrowverse. He is one of the inspirations that is adopted by Oliver Queen for which he becomes the vigilante Green Arrow in the superhero television series Arrow. In the related series, The Flash, antagonist Vandal Savage mentions that he trained Robin Hood to become the professional archer that he was known as.
- Elements of Robin Hood are used for some episodes of the Disney+/MCU animated series What If...?. In "What If... T'Challa Became a Star-Lord?", the titular protagonist uses the story of Robin Hood as an inspiration for him to redeem the Ravagers, who develop a vow to steal from the rich and donate to the poor. In "What If... the Avengers Assembled in 1602?", a version of Steve Rogers also becomes a Robin Hood-themed character, with Scott Lang and Bucky Barnes being versions of the Merry Men.

=== Abandoned projects ===
- In 2010, Lana and Lilly Wachowski announced their intention to direct the film Hood, a modern adaptation of the Robin Hood legend.
- In 2014, Disney were developing a Robin Hood movie provisionally titled Nottingham & Hood, with first time screenwriter Brandon Barker writing, and a tone similar to the Pirates of the Caribbean film series. The hope was to launch a new adventure franchise that fit Disney's global brand.
- Also in 2014, Sony Pictures mooted the idea of building a shared universe based on various characters from the Robin Hood mythos, spinning off Merry Men like Will Scarlett and Little John into their own separate films.

== Robin Hood - Musicals ==
"Arrow: The Legend of Robin Hood" was a musical production made by the Stage Musicals Group at the Alameda Open Air Theatre in Gibraltar from 23 June 2003 to 30 June 2003. It was directed by one of its writers, Mr. Trevor Galliano.

== Robin Hood, English-language animated films and television series ==
=== Theatrical shorts ===
- 1939: Robin Hood Makes Good, a Merrie Melodies cartoon directed by Chuck Jones.
- 1948: Robin Hood-Winked, an animated cartoon with Popeye.
- 1949: Rabbit Hood, a Merrie Melodies cartoon directed by Chuck Jones featuring Bugs Bunny and archive footage of Errol Flynn from the 1938 film.
- 1949: Robin Hoodlum, a UPA cartoon starring The Fox and the Crow with the Fox as Robin Hood, and the Crow as the Sheriff.
- 1955: Robin Rodenthood, a Herman and Katnip cartoon directed by Dave Tendlar.
- 1958: Robin Hood Daffy, a Merrie Melodies cartoon directed by Chuck Jones in which Daffy Duck believes he is Robin Hood and tries unsuccessfully to convince an unbelieving Porky Pig (himself dressed like Friar Tuck).
- 1958: Robin Hoodwinked, an MGM Tom and Jerry cartoon directed by William Hanna and Joseph Barbera.
- 1961: Bopin' Hood, a Paramount Cartoon Studios cartoon directed by Seymour Kneitel.
- 1963: Robin Hoody Woody, a Walter Lantz Productions cartoon directed by Paul Smith with Woody Woodpecker in the Robin Hood role.
- 1963: Not in Nottingham, a Hanna-Barbera cartoon featuring Loopy de Loop and Robin Hood.
- 1967: Robin Hood-winked, a Noveltoons cartoon directed by Shamus Culhane
- 1968: Pinkcome Tax, a DePatie–Freleng Enterprises cartoon directed by Arthur Davis and starring the Pink Panther, who takes on the role of a Merry Man, and unsuccessfully tries to free an imprisoned peasant (played by the Panther's recurring foil, The Little Man) who is locked up for being too poor to pay his taxes. After both of them wind up in the dungeon, they get a letter from Robin Hood who promises to save them, only for Robin to be jailed as well.
- 1970: Robin Goodhood, a DePatie–Freleng Enterprises cartoon directed by Gerry Chiniquy and featuring Roland and Rattfink.

=== Theatrical features ===
- 1973: Robin Hood, a Walt Disney Studios animated feature depicting various characters as anthropomorphic animals, including Robin Hood and Maid Marian as foxes.
- 1982: The Last Unicorn is a 1982 animated fantasy film directed and produced by Arthur Rankin Jr. and Jules Bass, from a script by Peter S. Beagle adapted from his 1968 novel of the same title. There is a scene in which a grubby and uninspiring band of forest brigands pride themselves on being the “reality” of Robin Hood's grand and moral myths—that is, until a magic spell causes illusions of the authentic characters seemingly to come to life and prance by, the undying charm of which lures the whole band after them in a desperate effort to become a part of their beautiful tale.
- 2001: Robin Hood (credited as "Monsieur Hood" and voiced by Vincent Cassel) and the Merry Men make a brief appearance as unwelcome rescuers in the film Shrek. Here, they speak with French accents, partake in Irish step-dancing, and are defeated by Princess Fiona. The Latin American dub depicts Robin Hood commanding the Musketeers.

=== Direct-to-video features ===
- 2012: Tom and Jerry: Robin Hood and His Merry Mouse, a film released in October 2012 starring Tom and Jerry.

=== Animated television films ===
- 1971: The Legend of Robin Hood, an animated television film from the CBS anthology series Famous Classic Tales.
- 1972: The Adventures of Robin Hoodnik, a television film produced by Hanna-Barbera whose all-animal cast predates the Disney version by one year.
- 1985: The Adventures of Robin Hood, an animated film produced by Burbank Films Australia.
- 1986: Ivanhoe, an animated television film with Robert Coleby providing the voice of Robin Hood.
- 1992: The New Adventures of Robin Hood, an animated film produced by Burbank Animation Studios.
- 2007: Robin Hood: Quest for the King, an animated television film with anthropomorphised characters; produced by BKN International.

=== Television series ===
- 1959: "Robin Hood Yogi", a Yogi Bear segment from The Huckleberry Hound Show.
- 1959: "Nottingham and Yeggs", a Huckleberry Hound segment from The Huckleberry Hound Show.
- 1960: "Robin Hood", an episode of Mel-O-Toons.
- 1960: "Robin Hood", an episode of Peabody's Improbable History.
- 1960: "Robin Hood Magoo", an episode of Mister Magoo.
- 1961: "The Munchkin Robin Hood", an episode of Tales of the Wizard of Oz.
- 1963: "Robin Hoodlum", episode 45 of Touché Turtle and Dum Dum from The Hanna-Barbera New Cartoon Series.
- 1964: "Robin Hood", a four-part episode of The Famous Adventures of Mr. Magoo, featuring Mr. Magoo in the role of Friar Tuck.
- 1965: "Robin Hood & His Merry Muggs", episode 4 of Secret Squirrel and Morocco Mole from The Atom Ant/Secret Squirrel Show.
- 1966: Rocket Robin Hood, a space-age version of the Robin Hood legend, where he and his band of Merry Spacemen live in the year 3000 on Sherwood Asteroid and fight the evil Sheriff who rules the space territory of N.O.T.T. (National Outer-space Terrestrial Territories).
- 1972: Festival of Family Classics, an animated anthology series by Rankin/Bass, featured a one-shot adaptation of the Robin Hood story by William Overgard as its tenth overall episode.
- 1975: "Robin Ho Ho", episode 3c of The Tom and Jerry Show (1975).
- 1975: "Robin Cat", episode 4 of The Secret Lives of Waldo Kitty.
- 1977: "Egypt and Sherwood Forest", episode 8 from the first season of Laff-A-Lympics.
- 1979: "Popeye of Sherwood Forest", episode 7c from the third season of The All New Popeye Hour.
- 1981: "Robin Hoodwink", episode 4 of the Kwicky Koala segment from The Kwicky Koala Show.
- 1982: The Smurfs cartoon series featured a second-season episode titled "The Adventures of Robin Smurf" where Vanity Smurf took the role of Robin Hood, Smurfette was Maid Marian, Brainy Smurf as Prince John, and Clumsy Smurf as the Sheriff of Nottingham.
- 1983: The Monchhichis/Little Rascals/Richie Rich Show featured the second Zillion-Dollar Adventures segment of the latter show, "Richie Hood", in which Reggie ridicules Richie on their trip to England mentioning he invited him to see a bunch of trees, only to clarify that it was actually Sherwood Forest where the legend of Robin Hood happened.
- 1984: Danger Mouse launched their sixth season of the show with a spoof titled "Once upon a Timeslip...", in which the narrator discovered his voice controlled the on-screen antics, and who then put Danger Mouse and his assistant Penfold through a comic adventure as Robin Hood and Little John.
- 1987: "Robin Potato Head", episode 16 of the Potato Head Kids segment from My Little Pony 'n Friends.
- 1988: ALF Tales, has an episode titled "Robin Hood", where the cast fights for the right to promote their swing band, Ye Merry Men.
- 1989: Robin Hood was parodied in The Super Mario Bros. Super Show! in the episode "Hooded Robin and His Mario Men" as the eponymous character, an albatoss who can imitate anyone's voice, and helped the young Mushroom Peoples of Sharewood Village against the Sheriff of Koopingham.
- 1990: Garfield and Friends featured an episode titled "Robin Hog", a U.S. Acres segment where Orson fantasizes himself as Robin Hog.
- 1990: "Don Coyote Meets Robin Hood", episode 5 from the first season of The Adventures of Don Coyote and Sancho Panda.
- 1990: The Tiny Toon Adventures episode "The Weirdest Stories Ever Told" featured a segment titled "Robin Hare". This version featured Buster as the title character and Montana Max as the "Sheriff of Naughty Ham". A book loosely based on the episode was also released, possibly as "Buster Hood".
- 1991: An episode of Captain N: The Game Master, titled "Misadventures in Robin Hood Woods", had the heroes of the show aid Robin in defeating Prince John and rescuing Maid Marian.
- 1991: Young Robin Hood, an animated series developed by Cinar and Hanna-Barbera, tells a version of the story in which Robin (Voiced by Thor Bishopric) and his men, as well as Maid Marian, are teenagers. This version also incorporates several fantasy elements. For example, Robin is sometimes assisted by a forest-dwelling old woman who knows magic.
- 1991: The Ren & Stimpy Show episode "Robin Höek" from the first season had Ren Höek and Stimpy recreate the story of Robin Hood with Ren as Robin Hood and Stimpy as everyone else. Though it was a story Stimpy read, it ended as a nightmare for Ren.
- 1993: "Rob'n Hoodwinked", episode 26b from the first season of The Pink Panther.
- 1993: In Animaniacs, through its 38th first-season episode "Spell-Bound", the Goodfeathers are featured portraying Robin Hood and the Merry Men. They get into an argument with Slappy Squirrel, who is portraying Little Red Riding Hood over their cameo appearances, while Pinky and the Brain soldier on with their plot for world domination.
- 1998: Arthur, through its second-season episode, "Buster Hits the Books", concerns Buster trying to write a book report, and his friends try finding a book for him to read easily. After unable to pay attention, he eventually settles on a book that interests him: Robin Hood. The plot is continued in the beginning of the next episode "Arthur's Faraway Friend", in which Arthur and Buster both make a creative mess out of writing a continuation of the book.
- 1999: "Robin Hoodwinked", episode 13a from the third season of Timon & Pumbaa.
- 1999: "I Are Robin Hood", episode 6 from the fifth season of I Am Weasel.
- 2000: "Robinita Hood", episode 12 from the third season of Happily Ever After: Fairy Tales for Every Child.
- 2001: "Robin 'n Stealin' with Mr. Hood", episode 6b from the first season of Time Squad.
- 2001: Robin Hood and his Merry Men have a brief cameo in Samurai Jack, in its first episode "The Beginning", as Jack's mentors when he visits England during his training.
- 2004: "Lilly and Robin Hood", episode 12 from the first season of Lilly the Witch.
- 2005: King Arthur's Disasters, a British animated series features Robin Hood who rivals Arthur.
- 2005: Codename: Kids Next Door, through its thirteenth fourth season episode segment "Operation: L.U.N.C.H." features an antagonist called Robin Food who, along with his "Merry Men", steals school cafeteria food from children to give to senior citizens for their nursing home cafeteria.
- 2008: An episode of the Canadian-American children's TV series, The Backyardigans features an episode titled "Robin Hood the Clean", which shows Pablo the Penguin assuming his own playful version of the character Robin Hood as he happily works to clean up the village of Filthingham.
- 2008: "Robin Hood and His Merry Pigs", episode 37 of The Pinky and Perky Show.
- 2012: The VeggieTales video Robin Good and His Not-So-Merry Men features a version of the legend featured as the titular segment. This version featured Larry the Cucumber as the title character (Robin Hood), Jimmy Gourd as Little John, Archibald Asparagus as Friar Cluck (Friar Tuck), Mr. Lunt as Bill Scarlet, Bob the Tomato as the Sheriff of Bethlingham (Sheriff of Nottingham), and Mr. Nezzer as Prince John.
- 2013: In Ever After High, the son of Robin Hood, Sparrow Hood, appears. He has a band called The Merry Men.
- 2019: Sherwood is an American animated science fiction web television series created by Diana Manson and Megan Laughton that premiered on March 6, 2019, on YouTube Premium. It is a new telling of the Robin Hood legend.
- 2012: A wax figure of Robin Hood is among the collection of cursed wax figures possessed by Grunkle Stan for his wax museum in "Headhunters", the third overall episode of Gravity Falls.
- 2014: "Lil Rob'n Hood" episode 11b from the second season of Wild Grinders.

== Robin Hood-themed non-English language films and television series ==
=== Live-action theatrical features ===
- 1960: Robin Hood and the Pirates (Italian: Robin Hood e i pirati), an Italian film with Lex Barker as Robin Hood.
- 1962: The Triumph of Robin Hood (Italian: Il trionfo di Robin Hood), an Italian film with Don Burnett as Robin Hood and Samson Burke as Little John.
- 1962: Sakhi Robin, an Indian Hindi-language drama film by B. J. Patel, starring Rajan Kapoor as the outlaw and Shalini as Maid Marian.
- 1965: Adventure of Robin Hood and Bandits, an Indian Hindi-language film again by B.J. Patel, starring Prashant as Robin Hood, Parveen Choudhary as Maid Marian, Shyam Kumar as Prince John, Saudagar Singh as Little John, Lord Jambal as Sheriff of Nottingham, and Nilofer as Christabel - the fiancée of Alan-a-Dale.
- 1970: Robin Hood, the Invincible Archer (Spanish: Robin Hood, el arquero invencible, Italian: Robin Hood, l'invincibile arciere), a Spanish/Italian co-production directed by José Luis Merino with Carlos Quiney as Robin Hood.
- 1970: The Magnificent Robin Hood (Italian: Il magnifico Robin Hood), an Italian/Spanish co-production directed by Roberto Bianchi Montero and featuring George Martin as Robin Hood.
- 1971: Long Live Robin Hood (Italian: L'arciere di fuoco, also known as The Scalawag Bunch), an Italian film starring Giuliano Gemma as Robin Hood.
- 1975: The Arrows of Robin Hood (Russian: Стрелы Робин Гуда, romanized: Strely Robin Guda), a Soviet adaptation in Russian by Sergey Tarasov, starring Boris Khmelnitsky as Robin Hood, with songs of Vladimir Vysotsky.
- 1983: The Ballad of the Valiant Knight Ivanhoe (Russian: Баллада о доблестном рыцаре Айвенго, romanized: Ballada o doblestnom rytsare Ayvengo), a Russian adaptation of Sir Walter Scott's Ivanhoe by Sergey Tarasov, with songs of Vladimir Vysotsky, starring Boris Khmelnitsky as Robin Hood, who helps Ivanhoe to restore Richard's kingdom.
- 1986: Superfantozzi, an Italian film, the fifth of the Fantozzi comedy film series. Directed by Neri Parenti, it stars Paolo Villaggio as several incarnations of the character Ugo Fantozzi during the whole history of humanity. In one segment set in medieval England, a poor Fantozzi is given a large sum of gold from Robin Hood (played by Luc Merenda), only to be robbed minutes later by Robin himself because that gold made him rich.
- 1988: Aaj Ka Robin Hood (Translation: Today's Robin Hood) is a 1988 adventure-drama Indian Hindi film directed and produced by Tapan Sinha. It stars Anil Chatterjee, Utpal Dutt, Nana Patekar, Rabi Ghosh and Satish Shah in lead roles.
- 1990: O Mistério de Robin Hood (Portuguese: Xuxa e os Trapalhões em O Mistério de Robin Hood) is a 1990 Brazilian comedy-adventure film, directed by José Alvarenga Júnior. The film is starring Xuxa Meneghel and Os Trapalhões.
- 1991: Robin Good: Sugod Ng Sugod, a Filipino Parody comedy movie released by Viva Entertainment and directed by Tony Y. Reyes
- 2012: Robin Hood: Ghosts of Sherwood, a German/US international co-production.

=== Live-action television films ===
- 1966: Robin Hood, der edle Räuber, a German television film (in two parts) with Hans von Borsody as Robin Hood

=== Live-action television series ===
- 2008: Catch Me Now, a Chinese TV series, with modern settings
- 2016: Alyas Robin Hood a Philippine television drama action crime series broadcast by GMA Network. Directed by Dominic Zapata, it stars Dingdong Dantes in the title role.

=== Parodies, theatrical films ===
- 1952: The Last Robin Hood (French: Le dernier Robin des Bois), a French light comedy in which Roger Nicolas portrays a summer camp supervisor who dresses himself as Robin Hood to impress a young woman (Nicole Maurey), then has to save her with the help of the children from the leader of a smuggler gang.
- 1975: Little Robin Hood (Spanish: El pequeño Robin Hood), a Mexican family comedy adventure film directed by René Cardona from a screenplay written by his son René Cardona Jr., Robin is a 12-year-old boy accompanied by his friends, Aramis the old gypsy and Lucifer the chimpanzee, as they commit small-time thefts to help the poor members of the gypsy community in the 19th century American Old West.
- 1966: Beware of the Car (Russian: Береги́сь автомоби́ля, romanized: Beregis Avtomobilya) updates the legend to modern Russia, with Innokenty Smoktunovsky playing a taxi driver turned car thief who gives the stolen money to orphanages.
- 1968: About Seven Brothers (Finnish: Noin seitsemän veljestä) is a Finnish loose-based parody of the Robin Hood story, directed by Jukka Virtanen, and written, produced and starred by Spede Pasanen.

=== Parodies, short films ===
- 2004: Nottingham 2051. Year 2051. Robin Hood and Little John want to deliver "essential pharmacies" in the third world. Robin Hood is played by Tiziano Scrocca. Italian production

=== Parodies, theatrical films ===
- 1985:Naan Sigappu Manithan is a Tamil-language action thriller film directed by S. A. Chandrasekhar.
- 1985:Nyayam Meere Cheppali is a Telugu film starring Suman and Jayasudha in the lead roles
- 2008: Iljimae, a South Korean television drama series, based on a Chinese folklore from the Ming dynasty about a masked Robin Hood-esque character during the Joseon era.
- 2009: The Return of Iljimae, a South Korean television drama series, based on comic strip Iljimae, published between 1975 and 1977, by Ko Woo-yung which was based on a Chinese folklore from the Ming dynasty about a masked Robin Hood-esque character during the Joseon era.
- 2015: Kamen Rider Ghost; in the third overall episode "Bull's-eye! Archery of Justice!", Takeru Tenkūji can access a green archer form called Robin Damashii which is accessed by the ghost of Robin Hood himself. Robin's spirit also helps Takeru on his journey to unite the fifteen Legendary Heroic Souls.

=== Animated films ===
- 1970: Brave Robin Hood, a Soviet stop-motion animated film of a film studio "Soyuzmultfilm" which was created by the director Anatoliy Karanovich on Evgeny Agranovich's verses performed by Mikhail Ziv.

=== Animated television series ===
- 1990–1992: Robin Hood (Japanese: ロビンフッドの大冒険, Robin Hood no Daibōken), a Japanese animated series developed by Tatsunoko Productions, tells a version of the story in which Robin (Voiced by Kazue Ikura) and his men (and women), as well as Maid Marian, are – in majority – children. This version also incorporates several fantasy elements, mainly expressed in mystic powers of the nature and a powerful treasure protected by the forest Sherwood itself. The whole series contains strong environmental messages as well as morals relating to real life.
- 1994: Hello Kitty and Friends, the 1989–1998 Sanrio anime series, has an episode based on Robin Hood featuring Keroppi in the eponymous role, Kero Kero Keroppi no Robin Hood (けろけろけろっぴのロビンフッド, Kero Kero Keroppi's Robin Hood), in which the Sanrio characters reenact the legend.
- 1995: "Robin Hood", episode 10 of World Fairy Tale Series.
- 1997: In an episode of Cutey Honey Flash anime, one of the forms Honey takes in that episode is Robin Hood Honey.
- 2013: Robin Hood: Mischief in Sherwood, an Indian-French CGI animated series produced by Method Animation and DQ Enternainement. Shows a children's version of Robin Hood.
- 2018: Robin Hood is featured as a servant summoned from the past to fight in a Holy Grail War in the anime series Fate/Extra Last Encore, a part of the Fate/stay night franchise created by Kinoko Nasu.

== See also ==
- List of works based on Arthurian legends
- Robin Hood in popular culture
- Outlaw
