= Oleg Vidov =

Russian–American actor, film director and producer

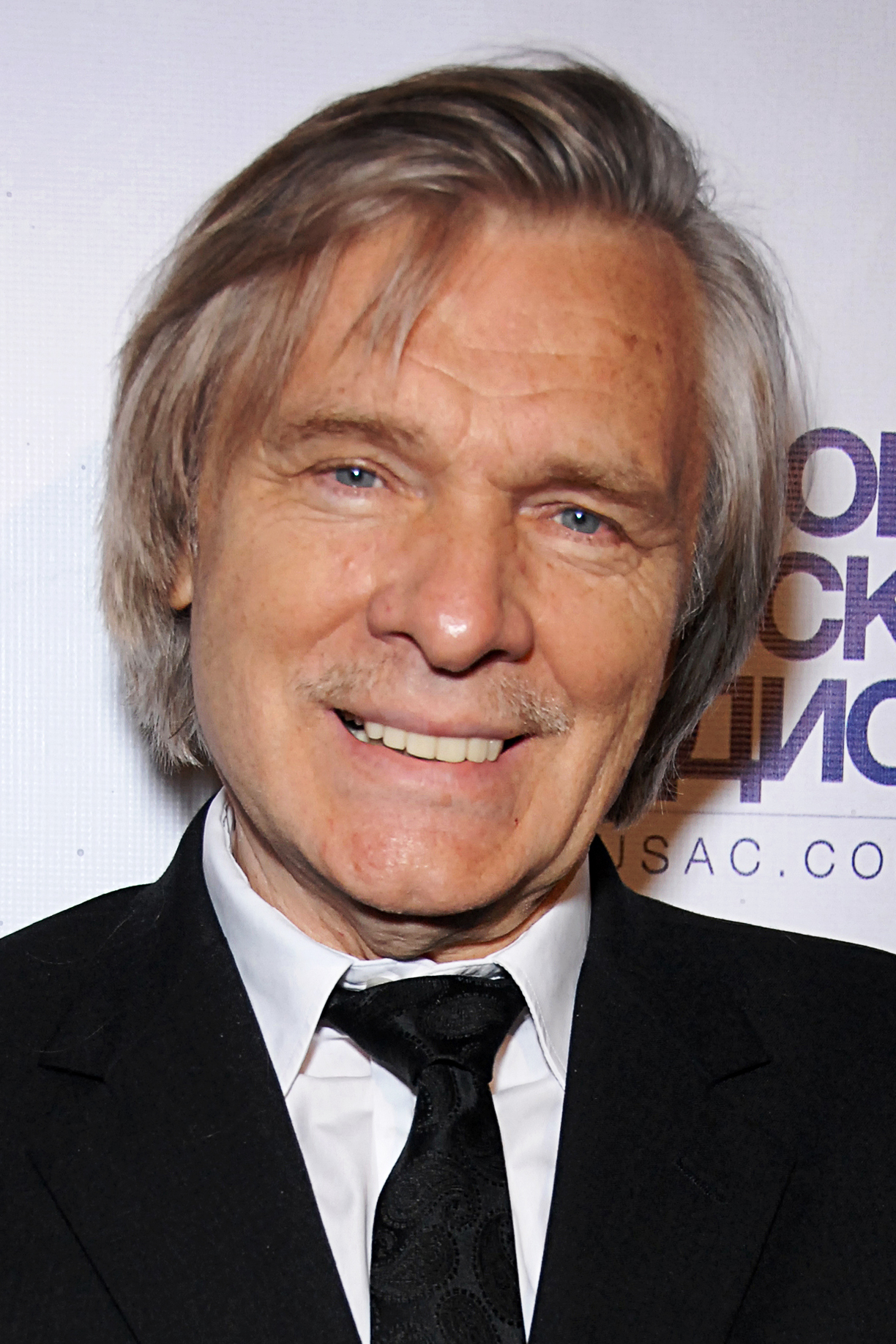
- Vidov at Studio City, California, 2013
- Born: Oleg Borisovich Vidov; June 11, 1943; Moscow Oblast, Russian SFSR, Soviet Union (present-day Russia)
- Died: May 15, 2017 (aged 73); Westlake Village, California, U.S.
- Occupations: Actor; director; producer
- Years active: 1961–2014
- Spouse(s): Natalia Vasilievna Fedotova (1970–1976; divorced); Joan Borsten (until his death)
- Children: 2

Oleg Borisovich Vidov (Russian: Олег Борисович Видов; June 11, 1943 – May 15, 2017) was a Russian–American actor, film director and producer. He appeared in 50 films beginning in 1961. An emigrant from his native Soviet Union, he was granted U.S. citizenship and became a naturalized American.

== Early life ==
Oleg Vidov was born in either the Leninsky District, Moscow Oblast or Vidnoye, Moscow Oblast to Varvara Ivanovna Vidova, a teacher and a school principal, and Boris Nikolaievich Garnevich, an economist and a Finance Ministry deputy. According to Garnevich's fifth wife, Irina Vavilova, Garnevich was an influential man and served as an assistant of Lazar Kaganovich. Vidov was raised by his mother under her surname. He spent his childhood in Russia, Mongolia and East Germany where his mother was assigned to work. When she was sent to China, he went to live with his aunt Anuta in Kazakhstan near the Chinese border. Eventually all of them moved to Moscow.

== Career ==
Vidov played his first episodic role in 1960 in the teen drama My Friend, Kolka! In 1962 he entered actor's courses at VGIK led by Yakov Segel and Yuri Pobedonostsev.

As a student he acted in a number of movies, including main parts in The Blizzard and An Ordinary Miracle (both from 1964). He graduated in 1966 and continued his active movie career. He was also noticed by foreign directors and was given permission to perform in such films as Hagbard and Signe (by Denmark, Sweden and Iceland) and Battle of Neretva (by Yugoslavia, Italy, West Germany and the United States), as well as a joint Soviet-Italian-American production Waterloo.

In 1970 he met and married actress Natalia Vasilievna Fedotova. According to the most popular version, she was a daughter of the powerful KGB general Vasily Fedotov known for his friendship with Leonid Brezhnev and his daughter, Galina. Vidov denied it, claiming that his father-in-law was in fact a professor of Russian history who worked at university, although he admitted that Brezhneva was a close friend of his wife. They had a son Vyacheslav. Soon Vidov started dating a VGIK student Malvina Vishnya, which led to public scandal. He filed for divorce in 1976. Fedotova and Brezhneva then reportedly used their influence to ruin Vidov's career.

Directors stopped offering him big roles, and when in 1978 he himself finished director's courses at VGIK led by Efim Dzigan, he couldn't receive his diploma until Stanislav Rostotsky stepped in and awarded his short film Crossing with the highest mark.

In 1983 Vidov was given permission to live and work in Yugoslavia with his second wife, Yugoslavian actress Verica Stamenković.

In May 1985, Soviet authorities unexpectedly required him to return to Moscow within 72 hours, so an Austrian actor friend helped procure an Austrian visa for him. Together they drove to the Yugoslavian-Austrian border where he escaped into Austria. Vidov was then able to emigrate to the U.S. under a refugee visa from the U.S. embassy in Rome obtained with the help of the International Rescue Committee.

In the U.S., he married Joan Borsten, daughter of Hollywood publicist, scriptwriter and studio executive Orin Borsten (1912–2005). The couple garnered the international distribution rights to the award-winning Soyuzmultfilm Studio animation library in 1992 and helped popularize Soviet animation around the world.

In 2007 Vidov co-founded Malibu Beach Recovery Center, a well-respected alcohol and drug treatment program based on the principles of neuroscience in Malibu, California. Vidov served as chairman of the board, and his wife Joan as CEO, until June 2014 when they sold the center to a medical investment branch of Wells Fargo Bank. The Malibu Beach Recovery Center has been featured on television shows such as A&E's Intervention.

== Death ==
Vidov died on May 15, 2017, from complications following a battle with cancer at his Westlake Village, California, home at the age of 73. He is interred at Hollywood Forever Cemetery.

== Selected filmography ==
- My Friend, Kolka! (1961) (uncredited)
- The End of the World (1962) as Vanya
- An Easy Life (1963) as theater visitor
- Esli ty prav... (1964)
- Walking the Streets of Moscow (1964) as Chap on a Bicycle (uncredited)
- I Am Twenty (1965) (uncredited)
- The Blizzard (1965) as Vladimir
- An Ordinary Miracle (1965)
- The Tale of Tsar Saltan (1967) as Tsarevich Gvidon
- Hagbard and Signe (1967) as Hagbard
- Uzrok smrti ne pominjati (1968) as Nemacki pukovnik
- Ima ljubavi, nema ljubavi (1968)
- Battle of Neretva (1969) as Nikola
- Waterloo (1970) as Tomlinson
- Mission in Kabul (1970) as Skazkin
- Gentlemen of Fortune (1971) as Lieutenant Vladimir Slavin
- Lion's Grave (1971) as Masheka
- Tecumseh (1972) as Elliot
- Lützower (1972) as Major Margent
- Train Stop — Two Minutes (1972, TV Movie) as Igor Maksimov
- Za vsyo v otvete (1973)
- The Headless Horseman (1973) as Morris Gerald
- Adventures of Mowgli (1973) (voice)
- All in Response (1973) as presenter
- Moscow, My Love (1974) as Wolodja
- Pokoj, rci, jad (1975) as Gavriil
- Ivanov's Family (1975) as Nikolai Osintsev
- Rudin (1977) as Sergey Pavlovich Volyntsev
- Die Fledermaus (1979, TV Movie) as Alfred
- Urgent ... Secret ... Hubchek (1982) as Staff Captain Petrov
- Cry of Silence (1983) as Pavel Kolchin, the huntsman
- Demidovs (1984) as Nefyodov
- Jenseits der Morgenröte (1985, TV miniseries) as Ivan
- Orkestar jedne mladosti (1985) as Brauske
- U zatvoru (1985) as Slobodan
- Red Heat (1988) as Yuri Ogarkov
- Wild Orchid (1990) as Otto Munch
- Three Days in August (1992) as Gen. Vlasov
- Prisoner of Time (1993) as Alexander Jadov
- Love Affair (1994) as Russian Businessman
- The Immortals (1995) as Junkyard Owner
- Police Story 4: First Strike (1996) as Russian Group #7
- 2090 (1996) as Tony
- Wishmaster 2: Evil Never Dies (1999) as Osip Krutchkov
- A Christmas Tree and a Wedding (2000) as Man
- Thirteen Days (2000) as Valerian Zorin
- Monkey Love (2002) as Professor Dworkin
- Alias (2005–2006, TV Series) as Laborer
- Say It in Russian (2007) as Drunk Russian Man
- Player 5150 (2008) as Russian Dignitary
- Hollywood Seagull (2013) as Nina's Grandfather
- 6 Days Dark (2014) as Sergej Nikolajevich
