= Boris Khmelnitsky =

Russian actor (1940–2008)

- Born: Boris Alexandrovich Khmelnitsky; 27 June 1940; Voroshilov, Soviet Union
- Died: 16 February 2008 (aged 67); Moscow, Russia
- Occupation: actor
- Years active: 1967–2005

Boris Alexandrovich Khmelnitsky (Russian: Борис Александрович Хмельницкий; born on 27 June 1940 in Ussuriysk, died on 16 February 2008 in Moscow) was a Russian theatre and movie actor.

== Biography ==
He worked many years in the Taganka Theatre in Moscow. In cinema, he was known for many of his roles in Soviet adventure films. He played Robin Hood, Prince Igor, Captain Grant and many other characters. The last film he participated in was the 2008 film about Taras Bulba by Vladimir Bortko.

Played Robin Hood in 1976 film Robin Hood's Arrows (Russian: Стрелы Робин Гуда) and 1983 film The Ballad of the Valiant Knight Ivanhoe (Russian: Баллада о доблестном рыцаре Айвенго).

He married actress Marianna Vertinskaya in 1975. They were divorced in 1981; they had one child from this marriage Darya Khmelnitskaya. He died on 16 February 2008 of cancer.

== Partial filmography ==
- War and Peace (1966) as episode (uncredited)
- Whoever Returns Will Love (1968) as poet
- Sofiya Perovskaya (1968) as Nikolai Kibalchich
- The Eve of Ivan Kupala (1968) as Piotr
- The Red Tent (1969) as Viglieri
- Prince Igor (1969) as Prince Igor
- Robin Good's Arrows (1975) as Robin Good
- The Ballad of the Valiant Knight Ivanhoe (1983) as Robin Good
- Black Arrow (1985) as Lord Shoreby
- In Search for Captain Grant (1985, TV Mini-Series) as Captain Grant
- The Adventures of Quentin Durward, Marksman of the Royal Guard (1988) as Khairuddin
- Comedy of Lisistrate (1989) as Spartan ambassador
- Tragedy, Rock Style (1990) as Dmitriy Ivanovich's Friend
- Caravan of Death (1992) as Pin
- Murder at Sunshine Manor (1992) as Joe Alex
- Jonathan of the Bears (1994) as Religious Mercenary
- War is Over. Please Forget... (1997) as cameo
- The Black Prince (2004) as card player
- Taras Bulba (2009) as Borodaty (final film role)

== Awards ==
- People's Artist of Russia (2001)
