= Robin Hood Makes Good =

1939 film by Charles Jones

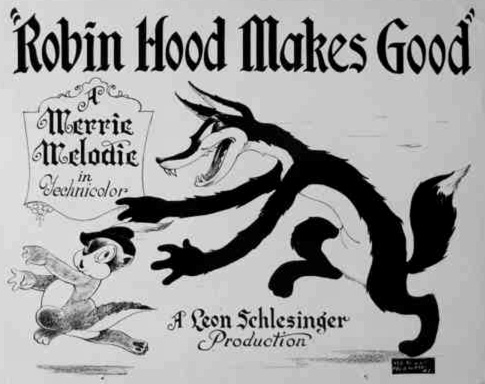
- Lobby card
- Directed by: Charles Jones
- Story by: Dave Monahan
- Produced by: Leon Schlesinger
- Starring: Bernice Hansen; Margaret Hill-Talbot; Mel Blanc
- Music by: Carl W. Stalling
- Animation by: Bob McKimson
- Color process: Technicolor
- Production company: Leon Schlesinger Productions
- Distributed by: Warner Bros. Pictures; The Vitaphone Corporation
- Release date: February 11, 1939
- Running time: 7 min
- Country: United States
- Language: English

Robin Hood Makes Good is a 1939 American animated comedy short film directed by Charles Jones. The short was released on February 11, 1939. It is part of the Merrie Melodies series. It was re-released as a "Blue Ribbon" reissue in 1946, rendering the original film and credits to be lost.

== Plot ==
A video in the restored version for the short.

Three little squirrels read a book about Robin Hood and argue about who will play act the titular character.

The largest squirrel bullies the two other squirrels to be respectively Little John and the Sheriff of Nottingham, to the smallest squirrel's chagrin. The small squirrel trudges off to await the inevitable song-and-dance attack of Robin Hood and Little John, while a fox, lurking on the side, sees them as his dinner and devises a ruse through which he pipes up, in a falsetto voice, claiming to be Robin's sweetheart Maid Marian in trouble. Robin and Little John follow the bait into the fox's cabin, whereupon the fox drops his pretense and his falsetto and hangs the two up by their breeches on the wall, declaring his intention to make a stew out of them.

The smallest squirrel, looking in from the outside of the cabin, devises a plan to save his friends. By means of voice imitations and sound effects, he makes the fox believe that hunters are after him. After he literally turns yellow and panics, in fear of his life, he runs away at maximum speed, beating the cabin door which accompanies him upright on his flight into fantasy. After being untied offscreen by the smallest squirrel, the two exit the cabin, only to be greeted by the latter, who asks them, "Who's gonna be Robin Hood?" with a grin.

== Home media ==
This short is available on disc 1 of the Looney Tunes Collector's Vault: Volume 1 Blu-ray set.

== Reception ==
The Film Daily (March 6, 1939): Funny Squirrels: "The adventures of three squirrels who find a book all about the career of Robin Hood. So they decide to emulate the ancient hero, and merry outlaws of the woods start on adventure bent. A fox reads the book they have discarded, and starts taking advantage of their make-believe game. He lures the two older squirrels into a log cabin, locks them in and prepares to make a nice meal. The younger squirrel rescues them and as his reward insists on being Robin Hood".

== See also ==
- List of films and television series featuring Robin Hood
