= Untypical Story =

- Russian: Трясина
- Directed by: Grigory Chukhray
- Written by: Grigory Chukhray; Viktor Merezhko
- Starring: Nonna Mordyukova; Vadim Spiridonov; Andrey Nikolaev; Valentina Telichkina; Irina Korablyova
- Cinematography: Mikhail Demurov; Yuri Sokol
- Edited by: Ekaterina Karpova
- Music by: Mikhail Ziv
- Production company: Mosfilm
- Release date: 1977
- Running time: 132 min.
- Country: Soviet Union
- Language: Russian

Untypical Story (Russian: Трясина, romanized: Tryasina) is a 1977 Soviet war drama film directed by Grigory Chukhray.

== Plot ==
The film tells about a Russian woman who lost her husband and eldest son and decides to hide her youngest son in the attic and keep him there until the war ends. But things did not go as she wanted.

== Cast ==
- Nonna Mordyukova as Matryona
- Vadim Spiridonov as Stepan
- Andrey Nikolaev as Mitya
- Valentina Telichkina as Nina
- Irina Korablyova as Tanya
- Valery Nosik as Grishka
- Vladimir Gusev as Misha
- Nikolay Dupak as Ilya Zakharovich
- Vladimir Basov as Petya Kornakov
- Galina Mikeladze as Katya
- Arkadi Smirnov as Kornakov
- Vera Kuznetsova as Kornakova
- Ivan Ryzhov as orthodox priest
- Nina Agapova as Faina
- Maria Vinogradova as old woman
- Vladimir Zamansky as military commissar
- Pyotr Todorovsky as episode
