= Turning (2002 film) =

- Russian: Превращение
- Directed by: Valery Fokin
- Written by: Valery Fokin; Franz Kafka; Ivan Popov
- Produced by: Leonid Bits; Oleg Lerner; Igor Pogrebinsky
- Starring: Yevgeny Mironov; Igor Kvasha; Tatyana Lavrova
- Cinematography: Igor Klebanov
- Edited by: Lidiya Volokhova
- Music by: Aleksandr Bakshi
- Production company: Mosfilm
- Release date: 17 October 2002
- Running time: 80 min.
- Country: Russia
- Language: Russian

Turning (Russian: Превращение, romanized: Prevrashchenie) is a 2002 Russian drama film directed by Valery Fokin. The film is an adaptation of The Metamorphosis by Franz Kafka.

The film tells about an exemplary family man who had a nightmare, after which he turned into a disgusting insect.

== Plot ==
Set in early 20th-century Prague, the film follows Gregor Samsa, who has been supporting his family and paying off his father's debts for years. One morning, Gregor wakes to find himself transformed into a large, grotesque insect with a hard shell and twitching legs. His transformation horrifies his parents and sister, as he is no longer able to work and financially support them. Revolted by his appearance, his family, focused only on material concerns, grows increasingly disdainful of him. They isolate Gregor in his room, which gradually becomes a storage space for unwanted items. Treated like an animal, Gregor still thinks, feels, and understands as before, retaining his humanity more fully than the family members who reject him. As Gregor's isolation deepens, the family's spiritual decay becomes apparent, with their narrow, materialistic values eclipsing any compassion.

== Cast ==
- Yevgeny Mironov as Gregor Samsa
- Igor Kvasha as father
- Tatyana Lavrova as mother
- Avangard Leontiev as manager
- Natalya Shvets as sister
- Leonid Timtsunik as shop owner
- Lyudmila Polyakova as new maid

== Critical response ==
According to film critic Lidiya Maslova, "the main miscalculation is the choice of Yevgeny Mironov for the main role. Mironov does not condescend to transform himself. He remains not so much a man, but a movie star who crawls on the floor on his stomach and sometimes arrogantly wiggles his fingers and toes".
