= Galina Stakhanova =

Soviet and Russian actress

- Stakhanova in 2008
- Born: Galina Konstantinovna Stakhanova; 12 October 1940 (age 86); Moscow, USSR
- Occupation: actress
- Years active: 1961 — present
- Children: 1

Galina Konstantinovna Stakhanova (Russian: Гали́на Константи́новна Стаха́нова; born 12 October 1940 in Moscow, RSFSR, USSR) is a Soviet and Russian actress of theater and cinema.

== Biography ==
Galina Stakhanova was born on 12 October 1940 in Moscow.

In 1960-1962, she was a pupil of the make-up artist at the Mayakovsky Theatre.

In 1962-1964 he was the head of the supply department in GITIS.

Since 1965 costume designer at the House of Culture of Moscow State University and administrator in groups at the Mosfilm Studio.

Since childhood, I dreamed of being an actress, but I did not dare to enter a theater university. Working in the theater, I met actress Vera Pashennaya and heard from her: There is a lot of warmth in you. You, of course, need to play. Go to amateur performance, from there start it.

In 1965 Galina passed the competition in the Student Theater of Moscow State University and became his actress, where she worked for a long time in parallel with the main work.

Since 1973, she worked in the procurement department of the Central Lenin Stadium.

Since 1985 senior controller of the Sports Palace Luzhniki.

Then she worked at the Theater of Roman Viktyuk. In the cinema since 1979. He is a characteristic actress, plays mostly supporting roles and episodes, although sometimes the main roles also occur.

== Personal life ==
She lives in Moscow in the residential area of Yasenevo. There is a daughter and a granddaughter. Likes to play bowling

== Selected filmography ==
- The Girls (1961) as Galya
- Scenes from Family Life (1979) as employee atelier
- Kindergarten (1983) as Zhenya's grandmother
- Long Memory (1985) as Maria Vasilyevna Shtyrenko
- Fast Train (1988) as Alla
- The Kerosene's Wife (1988) as Grusha
- Love with Privileges (1989) as old-timer
- The Asthenic Syndrome (1990) as doctor of the Moscow metro
- Stalin's Funeral (1990) as graveyard worker
- Demobbed (2000) as grandmother
- Old Hags (2000) as traveling
- Night Watch (2004) as old lady
- Gloss (2007) as old weaver
- Univer (2008—2010) as Avdotya
- Yolki (2010), Yolki 2 (2011), Yolki 3 (2013), Yolki 1914 (2014), Yolki 5 (2016) as Maria Ilyinichna (Baba Manya)
- Univer. New Dorm (2011) as Anton's and Kristina's neighbor
- Kitchen (2013) as sanitary at the hospital

Music video

- Garik Sukachov: Rings (2003)
- Sekret: On Either Side of the Earth (2013)
- Egor Kreed: Heartbreaker Girl (2019)
