= Nikolay Dupak =

Russian actor (1921–2023)

- Николай Дупак
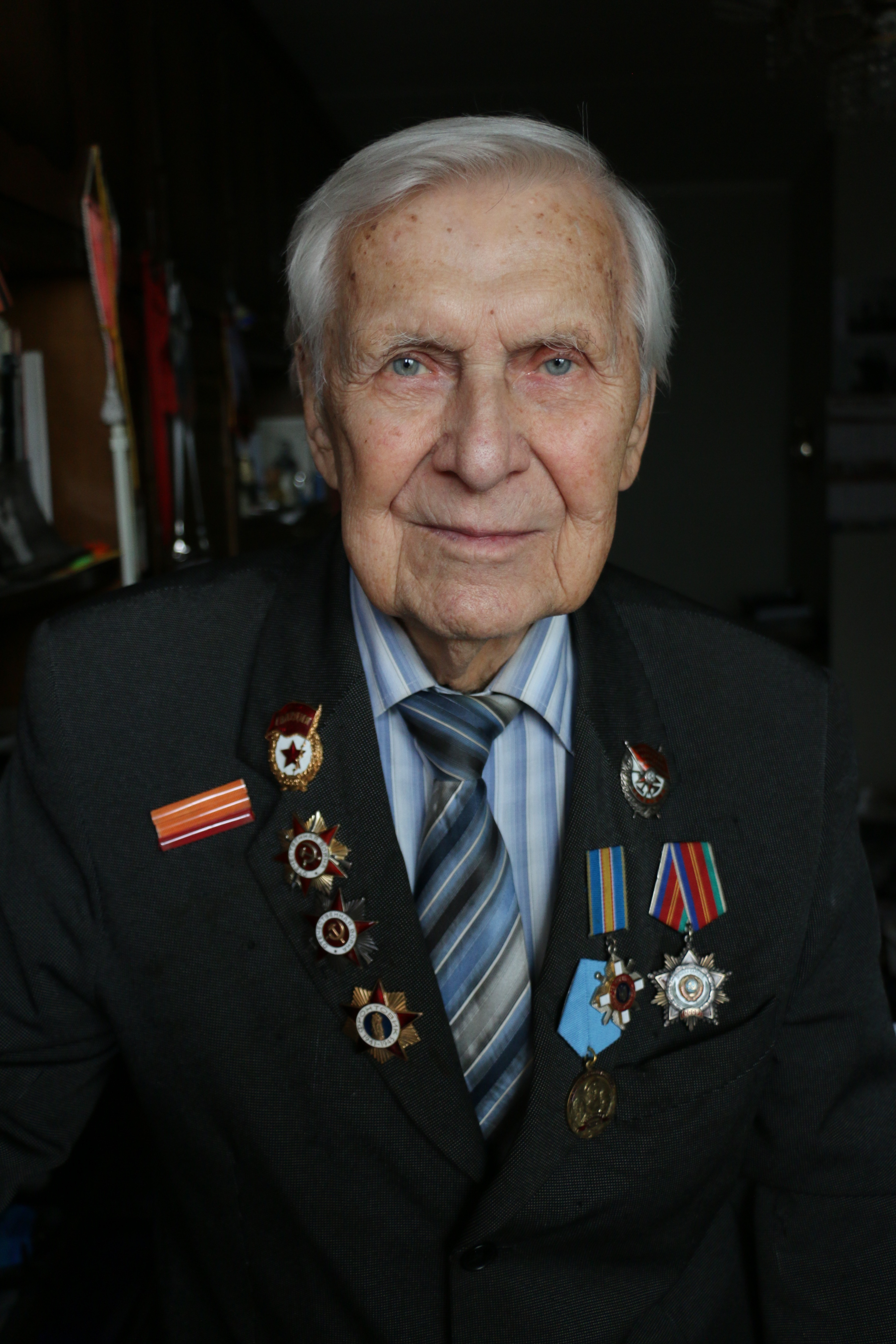
- Dupak in 2017
- Born: Nikolay Lukyanovich Dupak; 5 October 1921; Starobesheve, Ukrainian SSR, RSFSR
- Died: 26 March 2023 (aged 101); Moscow, Russia
- Occupation: Actor
- Years active: 1941–2023
- Spouse: Raisa Dupak

Nikolay Lukyanovich Dupak (Russian: Николай Лукьянович Дупак; 5 October 1921 – 26 March 2023) was a Soviet and Russian theater and film actor, theatre director, the head of theatres. Front-line soldier of World War II. Honored Artist of the RSFSR (1980), Merited Artist of Ukraine (2012), Honorary Artist of Moscow (2019).

== Biography ==
Born on 5 October 1921 in USSR in the village of Starobeshevo, Donetsk Oblast to a large family. Dupak was a fellow villager of Pasha Angelina.

In the spring of 1941, Dupak, now a young student of the Rostov Theater School, was approved for the role of Andrei in the film Taras Bulba directed by Alexander Dovzhenko, however, this picture was not filmed. But when they began to shoot the picture, the war began. Nikolai joined the people's militia. Then he served in the cavalry, went through the entire Great Patriotic War. He was wounded and shell-shocked three times.

Dupak was the leading actor and director of the Moscow Stanislavsky Theater, acting in a number of films while there. Then he moved to Taganka Theatre. It was he who invited Yuri Lyubimov and Vladimir Vysotsky to the theater. He persuaded the artist David Borovsky, who worked in Kiev, to move to Moscow. Dupak's creative career lasted 80 years.

Dupak died on 26 March 2023, at the age of 101.

== Selected filmography ==
- Dark Is the Night (1945) as Lieutenant Sannikov
- In the Mountains of Yugoslavia (1945) as adjutant
- The Forty-First (1956) as Chupilko
- Torrents of Steel (1967) as Volosatov
- Two Comrades Were Serving (1968) as army commander
- Intervention (1968) as Corporal Barbaru
- Bumbarash (1968) as Sovkov
- Eternal Call (1973) as Regional Committee Secretary Filimonov
- Captain Nemo (1975) as Colonel Bunro
- The Arrows of Robin Hood (1975) as miller, Maria's father
- Untypical Story (1977) as miller, Maria's father
- Life Is Beautiful (1979) as police commissioner
- The Ballad of the Valiant Knight Ivanhoe (1983) as Abbot Aymer
- Love with Privileges (1989) as Chairman of the Council of Ministers of the USSR
