= The Mysterious Wall =

- Directed by: Irina Povolotskaya; Mikhail Sadkovich
- Written by: Aleksandr Chervinsky; Irina Povolotskaya; Mikhail Sadkovich
- Starring: Lev Krugly; Tatyana Lavrova; Irakli Uchaneishvili; Andrei Mironov
- Cinematography: B. Brozhovsky; O. Zguridi
- Music by: Sergei Slonimsky
- Production company: Mosfilm
- Release date: 1967
- Running time: 79 minutes
- Country: Soviet Union
- Language: Russian

The Mysterious Wall (Russian: Таинственная стена, romanized: Tainstvennaya stena) is a 1967 Soviet science fiction film directed by Irina Povolotskaya and Mikhail Sadkovich.

== Plot ==
In the taiga a very strange phenomenon forms — a wall in the form of a dome about two kilometers in diameter from a foggy blanket that disappears and appears with a certain periodicity, and presumably constitutes a powerful electrostatic charge. This strange Wall attracts scientists who in the process of research find out that it causes the viewer to see different visions from the past.

Under the dome of the Wall is a research station, scientist Lomov (Lev Krugly) has been working there for the third month. Lomov believes that the Wall is an envoy of a different civilization, and, despite the futility of his attempts, continues to attempt contact. He, using a loan from a military locator, tries to transmit various pictures to the Wall and studies how it responds to them. The Wall reacts by causing hallucinations from the past life of locator operators, while the radar equipment burns out.

The authorities send there a friend of Lomov, Andrey (Irakli Uchaneyshvili) to replace him on duty, because he believes that Lomov has overtired himself and begins to fantasize that the Wall itself is an intelligent alien. Together with Andrei goes the bride Lomov, Lena (Tatyana Lavrova), and along the way to them the military attach senior sergeant Valya (Andrei Mironov). The sergeant was sent to prepare a broken locator for dismantling. All of them take an active part in discussions about what the Wall is, fix the locator, experiment with it, and come to the hypothesis that hallucinations are caused by Martians who are studying life on Earth in this way.

The culmination of the film is the moment when Lena during one of the phenomenon of mirages receives a clue that it is possible to make contact by entering the Wall. She tries to do it, but does not have time (the Wall closes), the comrades who come to watch observe this.

The expedition returns to Moscow with a report, where it gives a press conference at which journalists and scientists question Soviet scientists about the nature of the mysterious Wall.

Soviet scientists are beginning to prepare a new expedition from a large group of specialists for a detailed study of the Wall.

== Cast ==
=== Lead roles ===
- Lev Krugly as Yegor Lomov, scientist
- Tatyana Lavrova as Lena, the bride of Lomov
- Irakli Uchaneishvili as Andrei Iraklyevich Erdeli, scientist
- Andrei Mironov as Valentin Karpukhin, Senior Sergeant

=== Episodic roles ===
- Valentin Nikulin as Canadian traveler
- Alexander Zhorzholiani as uncle George, a fellow villager of Andrei Erdeli
- Nikolai Barmin as officer
- Elena Bratslavskaya as employee of the computer center
- Valentin Kozlov as episode
- Mikhail Orlov as commandant
- Sofya Davydova as episode
- Georgios Sovchis as a scientist at a press conference (credited as T. Sovkis)
- George Tusuzov as Head of Computing Center
- Revaz Khobua as fellow villager of Andrei Erdeli
- Evgeny Shutov as driver
- Viktor Sysoev as Kukushkin, the boy from the planetarium
- Sergei Golovanov as scientist at the press conference
- Yuri Leonidov as scientist at the press conference
- Alexander Orlov as scientist
- Alexander Kaidanovsky as employee of the computer center (uncredited)
- Anatoly Yabbarov as a sailor on the tanker (uncredited)
