= The Arrows of Robin Hood =

1975 film

- Directed by: Sergei Tarasov
- Written by: Sergei Tarasov; Kirill Rapoport
- Produced by: Mark Tsirelson
- Starring: Boris Khmelnitsky; Vija Artmane; Algimantas Masiulis
- Cinematography: Davis Simanis
- Music by: Vladimir Vysotsky; Raimonds Pauls; Aleksei Zubov
- Production company: Riga Film Studio
- Distributed by: Riga Film Studio
- Release date: 1975
- Running time: 80 min.
- Country: Soviet Union
- Language: Russian

The Arrows of Robin Hood (Russian: Стрелы Робин Гуда, romanized: Strely Robin Guda, alternative translations: Robin Good's Arrows, or Robin Gud's Arrows) is a Soviet 1975 historical action film about Robin Hood, directed by Sergei Tarasov.

Two soundtracks exist for the film. In 1975 Vladimir Vysotsky wrote and performed seven ballads, six of them were included in the final version. However a recommendation by Goskino editorial board called them inadequate for a romantic adventure; the real reason being conflicts with Vysotsky. In 1976 new songs were performed by Aija Kukule and Viktors Lapčenoks, lyrics by Lev Prozorovsky, music by Raimonds Pauls, this version was released in the cinemas. Four of Vysotsky's songs were later used in 1982 film The Ballad of the Valiant Knight Ivanhoe also directed by Tarasov, set in the same time and place and using some of the same characters. In the 1990s the film was successfully re-released with the 1975 soundtrack. The DVDs also have the 1975 soundtrack.

== Cast ==
- Boris Khmelnitsky as Robin Good (voiced by Alexander Belyavsky)
- Regīna Razuma as Maria
- Vija Artmane as Kat
- Eduards Pāvuls as Friar Tuck
- Hariy Shveiyts as Little John
- Algimantas Masiulis as Guy of Gisbourne
- Yuri Kamornyj as jester
- Juris Strenga as Bishop Gerford
- Ints Burāns as Sir Ralph, Sheriff of Nottingham
- Mirdza Martinsone as Lady Anna
- Jānis Plēsums as Alan
- Mārtiņš Vērdiņš as Sir Edmond
- Nikolay Dupak as miller
- Ivars Kalniņš as episode

== See also ==
- List of films and television series featuring Robin Hood
