= Tragedy, Rock Style =

- Russian poster
- Russian: Трагедия в стиле рок
- Directed by: Savva Kulish
- Written by: Savva Kulish
- Starring: Aleksei Shkatov; Olga Alyoshina; Aleksey Maslov; Sergei Karlenkov; Yuri Lazarev
- Cinematography: Vladimir Fastenko; Vladimir Klimov
- Edited by: Roza Rogatkina
- Music by: Sergey Kuryokhin
- Production company: Mosfilm
- Release date: 1988
- Running time: 167 min.
- Country: Soviet Union
- Language: Russian

Tragedy, Rock Style (Russian: Трагедия в стиле рок, romanized: Tragediya v stile rok) is a 1988 Soviet crime drama film directed by Savva Kulish.

== Plot ==
The film tells about a young man named Viktor Bodrov, who is invited to court in the case of his father, accused of major fraud. Leaving the courthouse, Viktor falls into the hands of Shaved...

== Cast ==
- Aleksei Shkatov as Viktor Bodrov
- Olga Alyoshina as Lena Kozlova
- Aleksey Maslov as Kassius
- Sergei Karlenkov as Genrikh
- Yuri Lazarev as Dmitriy Ivanovich Bodrov
- Tatyana Lavrova as Toma
- Valentin Nikulin as Dmitriy Ivanovich's Friend
- Albert Filozov as Dmitriy Ivanovich's Friend
- Boris Khmelnitsky as Dmitriy Ivanovich's Friend
- Antonina Dmitrieva as Mariya Stepanovna
