= Stalin's Funeral =

- Directed by: Yevgeni Yevtushenko
- Written by: Yevgeni Yevtushenko
- Starring: Vanessa Redgrave; Aleksey Batalov; Georgi Yumatov; Yevgeni Yevtushenko
- Narrated by: Vsevolod Larionov
- Cinematography: Anatoli Ivanov
- Edited by: Eleonora Praksina
- Music by: Charlie Chaplin; G. Maya; Igor Nazaruk
- Release date: 1990
- Running time: 109 minutes
- Country: Soviet Union
- Language: Russian

Stalin's Funeral (Russian: Похороны Сталина, romanized: Pokhorony Stalina) is a 1990 Soviet drama film written and directed by Yevgeni Yevtushenko. The film stars British actress Vanessa Redgrave.

== Plot ==
1953, USSR. Moscow bids farewell to Joseph Stalin. In the funeral crowd, Zhenya gets acquainted with Elya. Over the long hours spent in the funeral procession, they learn a lot about each other and become connected to each other, until Elya suddenly dies. Afterwards, Zhenya must begin another, adult, life.

== Cast ==
- Vanessa Redgrave as English journalist
- Denis Konstantinov as Zhenya
- Marina Kalinichenko as Elya
- Aleksey Batalov as Zhenya's father
- Georgi Yumatov as Stalin's guard
- Yevgeni Yevtushenko as Sculptor
- Yevgeni Platokhin as Bald
- Savva Kulish as Frenchman
- Vsevolod Larionov as Narrator (voice)
- Albert Toddle as American
- Maya Bulgakova as Stalin's wife
- Svetlana Kharitonova as Zhenya's aunt
- Mikhail Zhigalov as working
- Valentin Nikulin as neighbor
- Galina Stakhanova as graveyard worker
- Vladimir Ilyin as man in a pub
- Sergey Bezrukov (episode)

== Production ==
Yevtushenko's was more critical of Joseph Stalin's crimes by the time of production and he also sought to emphasise his generation's rejection of Stalinism; "If one is to speak about Stalinism, then we are still digging down to the roots of the poisonous tree of totalitarianism, of which Stalin was the gardener. But this film is not about the roots and not about the gardener but rather about the green shoots sprouting in the evil shade of that tree and yet straining toward the light, about our generation." Yevtushenko had also attended the funeral himself in 1953. Upon learning that both of his grandparents had been killed in the Great Purge in 1937, Yevtushenko's aunt told him a joke involving Stalin's quote "Life has become better, life has become more fun, comrades". The line is repeated by everyone at an insane asylum during an inspection, except for a doctor who refuses to say, stating: "Well, I’m a doctor—I’m not actually mad..."" This joke was subsequently included in the 1990 film.

== Reception ==
In the Sovetskaya Kultura newspaper, Igor Bestuzhev-Lada referred to the film as "without a doubt, a work of art—piercing and profound", praising it for not acting solely as a depiction of the funeral but instead as "a bitter, harrowing poem about how we fell victim to a gang of criminals who managed to violate, corrupt, and trample every single nation within our country..." In the same article, Vasily Kisunko gave a more mixed review, criticizing the film's presentation of the historical setting as inauthentic, writing: "The world he depicts—a world that shattered—seems to have been turned inside out. I miss a sense of that patriarchal consciousness—the feeling that comes when the old order collapses. What’s missing for me in Yevtushenko’s film is a true understanding of what that life was actually like—the way art and the craft of living were woven together. And yet, one must still give Yevtushenko his due."
