= Takeoff (film) =

Take-Off
- Directed by: Savva Kulish
- Starring: Yevgeni Yevtushenko; Larisa Kadochnikova; Albert Filozov
- Narrated by: Sergei Bondarchuk
- Cinematography: Vladimir Klimov
- Edited by: Roza Rogatkina
- Music by: Oleg Karavajchuk
- Production company: Mosfilm
- Distributed by: USA theatrical distribution by International Film Exchange (IFEX, 1982, subtitled).
- Release date: 1979
- Running time: 139 minutes
- Country: Soviet Union
- Language: Russian

Take-Off (Russian: Взлёт, romanized: Vzlyot) is a 1979 Soviet biopic about the Russian rocket scientist Konstantin Tsiolkovsky, directed by Savva Kulish and based on a screenplay by Oleg Osetinsky.

Savva Kulish was nominated for this film at the 11th Moscow International Film Festival, winning the Silver Prize.

== Plot ==
=== Part 1 ===
A school teacher, Konstantin Eduardovich, brings a device to class, and an experiment ends in an explosion. Later, at the pharmacy, where Tsiolkovsky goes to buy iodine and sulfuric acid, he meets a pharmacist, Sergei Ivanovich Panin (Albert Filozov). Their discussion about the possibility of “unleashing the atom” brings them closer, and Panin becomes one of Tsiolkovsky’s closest companions for many years.

Konstantin Eduardovich regularly sends his designs for a aerostat to the Russian Physical-Technical Society in Saint Petersburg, but receives repeated rejections, with responses claiming that the idea has no practical value and denying funding. The physicist Alexander Stoletov encourages Tsiolkovsky’s belief in the future of controlled balloons, but he is unable to offer him direct support.

Years go by, and the number of rejections reaches several dozen. Tsiolkovsky’s "scientific laboratory" remains housed in a simple shed.

He refers to his wife, Varvara Yevgrafovna (Larisa Kadochnikova), as a “healing elixir.” They have several children, and his greatest hope is placed in his son, Ignaty, whom he considers highly talented. However, Ignaty admits to his sister Lyuba that their father’s ideas irritate him. One day, Ignaty brings home a newspaper reporting that a zeppelin has already been built in Berlin. Tsiolkovsky, devastated by his own perceived inadequacy, destroys his workshop in frustration. Ignaty later leaves to study in Saint Petersburg.

The 20th century begins.

=== Part 2 ===
A telegram arrives from Saint Petersburg, notifying them of Ignaty’s death. Overcome with grief, Tsiolkovsky remains in a stupor for several days. As he begins to recover, police arrive to arrest his daughter Lyuba due to her involvement with revolutionaries. Varvara Yevgrafovna pleads with her husband to join her at church for Easter services, but even there, Tsiolkovsky continues calculating ideas in his mind. He slips out of the church and hurries to Panin’s place to share a new concept.

Panin urges his friend to free himself from the ideas to which he is “chained like a galley slave.” To prove the feasibility of his concepts, Konstantin Eduardovich organizes a demonstration flight of a small aerial device for Panin. The device indeed takes flight, but the experiment results in a cart catching fire in the town, and Tsiolkovsky is subsequently detained by the police.

The main narrative ends in 1903. The filmmakers then briefly recount key moments from Tsiolkovsky’s life, noting that his books will later become rare collectibles, and a formula he writes will carry his name. At this point, Tsiolkovsky is unaware that he will outlive his son Ivan and daughter Anna.

== Cast ==
- Yevgeni Yevtushenko as Konstantin Tsiolkovsky
- Larisa Kadochnikova as Varvara Yevgrafovna
- Albert Filozov as Panin
- Yelena Finogeyeva as Lyuba
- Kirill Arbuzov as Ignati
- V. Aleksandrov as Tailor
- Georgi Burkov as Rokotov
- Ion Ungureanu as Priest
- Vladimir Sedov as Yevgraf Nikolayevich
- Vladimir Erenberg as Trustee
- Olga Barnet as Trustee's wife
- Sergei Nasibov as Dmitri
- Anna Chizhikova as Masha, Tsiolkovsky's daughter
- Alla Chizhikova as Anya, Tsiolkovsky's daughter
- Anton Glotov as Irnatik, Tsiolkovsky's son
- Svetlana Reymouk as Lyuba
- Olegar Fedoro as Gendarme officer
- Amayak Akopyan
- Lidiya Dranovskaya
- Konstantin Zabelin
- S. Vologdin
- A. Golitsyn

Stunt department: Aleksandr Inshakov, Tadeush Kasyanov, Andrei Nikolayev, K. Feklin, S. Kharmandzhayev, A. Massarsky, V. Nikitin, A. Yanovsky
