= Olga Barnet =

Russian actress (1951–2021)

Olga Borisovna Barnet (Russian: О́льга Бори́совна Ба́рнет; 3 September 1951 – 25 June 2021) was a Soviet and Russian actress who worked at the Moscow Art Theatre. She made her film debut as Mother in Andrei Tarkovsky's Solaris (1972). She also appeared in the 1979 film Takeoff.

== Biography ==
Barnet was born into the family of film director Boris Barnet and actress Alla Kazanskaya.

She graduated from the Boris Shchukin Theatre Institute in 1972 and joined the company of the Moscow Art Theatre. She became one of its leading actresses and performed dozens of roles. She also appeared at the Oleg Tabakov Theatre.

In the final period of her life, Barnet was seriously ill and had not appeared at the Moscow Art Theatre for a long time. According to her colleagues, she had lost considerable weight during the preceding year and complained of poor health. Shortly before her death, she told writer Tatyana Bronzova that doctors had been unable to establish a diagnosis.

Barnet died on 25 June 2021.

Her former husband was director Valery Fokin. They studied at the Shchukin Theatre School and were briefly married while they were students.

== Filmography ==
Year	Title	Role	Notes
1972	Solaris	Kris Kelvin's mother	
1975	The Flight of Mr. McKinley	miss Ketti Benson	
1979	Takeoff	Trustee's wife	
1980	Moment of Structure	Nina	TV
1981	Born of the Storm	Yadviga	
1982	The Hat	Denisov's sister	
1982	Fairy tales... fairy tales... fairy tales of the old Arbat	episode	
1988	Restricted Area	Dymakovsky 's wife	
1992	Three Days in August	babysitter	
1993	Gladiator for Hire	Klavdievna	
2002	Poirot's Failure	Mrs. Ferrar	TV series
