= Fairy tales... fairy tales... fairy tales of the old Arbat =

- Directed by: Savva Kulish
- Written by: Aleksei Arbuzov (play); Savva Kulish
- Produced by: Boris Gostynsky
- Starring: Igor Vladimirov; Zinovy Gerdt
- Cinematography: Vladimir Klimov
- Music by: Alexey Rybnikov
- Production company: Mosfilm
- Release date: 1982
- Running time: 101 minutes
- Country: USSR
- Language: Russian

Fairy tales... fairy tales... fairy tales of the old Arbat (Russian: Сказки… сказки… сказки старого Арбата, translit. Skazki... skazki... skazki starogo Arbata) is a Soviet feature film directed by Savva Kulish, filmed in 1982 on the basis of Aleksei Arbuzov's play Fairy Tales of the Old Arbat.

== Plot ==
In one of the quiet cozy alleyways of old Moscow, lives a talented puppet master. He has a faithful friend Christopher, son Kuzya and many dolls. Suddenly, a sweet and tender girl, Viktosha, appears in the house, which was loved by her father, son, and even dolls.

== Cast ==
- Igor Vladimirov as Fyodor Kuzmich Balyasnikov, puppeteer
- Zinovy Gerdt as Christopher
- Larisa Suchkova as Viktosha (voiced by Olga Gobzeva)
- Kirill Arbuzov as Kuzma Balyasnikov
- Valery Storozhik as Lev Aleksandrovich Gartvig
- Olga Barnet (episode)
- Natalya Khorokhorina (episode)

== Filming ==
The film was shot at Bolshoy Gnezdnikovsky Lane in Moscow.
