= Three Days in August (1992 film) =

- Directed by: Jan Jung
- Written by: Shelagh Delaney; Aleksey Poyarkov; Michael Soby
- Produced by: Just Betzer
- Starring: Elena Astafeva; Olga Barnet; Aleksandr Belyavskiy; Pauls Butkevics; Dmitri Dobrovolsky; Dariya Majorova; Galina Polskikh; Raisa Ryazanova; Oleg Vidov; Anton Yakovlev
- Cinematography: Sergey Filippov
- Edited by: Rodney Holland
- Music by: Pete Repete
- Production company: MGM
- Release date: 1992
- Running time: 101 minutes
- Countries: Russia; United States
- Language: Russian

Three Days in August (Russian: Три августовских дня, romanized: Tri avgustovskikh dnya) is a co-production film between Russia and the United States directed by Jan Jung in 1992. The film is a drama that describes the 1991 Soviet coup d'état attempt through the story of lovers.

== Plot ==
A Russian Mikhail (Anton Yakovlev) and a Lithuanian Dalia (Dariya Majorova) came to Moscow to get married. The next day, the historic coup broke out. Mikhail must fight for the victory of democracy with Dalia. However, his father (Oleg Vidov) is the army general who belongs to the conservative side, against the reformist Gorbachev. And the army general is a man steeped in the Soviet colors. He is against his son's marriage to a Lithuanian and also against glasnost.
