= Tatyana Lavrova =

Soviet and Russian actress

- Born: 7 June 1938; Moscow, USSR
- Died: 16 May 2007 (aged 68); Moscow, Russia
- Occupation: actress
- Years active: 1959—2003

Tatyana Yevgenievna Lavrova (Russian: Татьяна Евгеньевна Лаврова; real name Andrikanis, June 7, 1938 — May 16, 2007) was a Soviet and Russian actress of theater and cinema. People's Artist of the RSFSR.

== Biography ==
The daughter of cinematographers Yevgeniy Nikolayevich Andrikanis (1909 — 1993) and Galina Pyshkova. Savva Morozov's cousin's great-grandson, an entrepreneur and philanthropist. She randomly opted for the nickname Lavrova for the sake of euphony.

After graduating from Moscow Art Theater School, she was an actress of the Moscow Art Theater in 1959-1961 and from 1978 and of Sovremennik Theatre 1961-1978.

All-Union glory of Lavrova brought the main role in the film by Mikhail Romm Nine Days in One Year.

Lived a civil marriage with Yevgeni Urbansky. The second husband is an actor Oleg Dal, with whom they lived for six months. The third actress's husband was a famous Soviet football player, Vladimir Mikhaylov. The son of the third marriage is Vladimir (1969).

In 1998 she was awarded the Order of Honour.

== Death ==
She died on May 16, 2007, after a long illness. She was buried in the Troyekurovskoye Cemetery in Moscow.

== Selected filmography ==
- 1947: Marite as classmate of the main character (episode)
- 1961: Nine Days in One Year as Lyolya
- 1965: Time, Forward! as Klava
- 1967: The Mysterious Wall as Lena
- 1971: All the King's Men as Sadie Burke
- 1975: The Flight of Mr. McKinley as Mrs. Perkins
- 1982: The Voice as Akhtyrskaya
- 1988: Tragedy, Rock Style as Toma
- 1998: Chekhov and Co as Olga Dmitrievna
- 2002: Turning as mother
