= Caravan of Death (1991 film) =

- Russian: Караван смерти
- Directed by: Ivan Solovov
- Written by: Gennadi Oreshkin
- Produced by: Mikhail Babakhanov; Ivan Solovyov
- Starring: Aleksandr Pankratov-Chyorny; Boris Khmelnitsky; Yelena Kondulainen; Viktor Pavlov; Vladimir Treshchalov
- Cinematography: Aleksandr Garibyan
- Edited by: Yelena Galkina
- Music by: Yevgeniy Gevorgyan
- Production company: Gummibär Art International
- Release date: 1991
- Country: Soviet Union
- Language: Russian

Caravan of Death (Russian: Караван смерти) is a 1991 Soviet action film directed by Ivan Solovov.

== Plot ==
A group of Afghan Mujahideen are planning a diversion. They have in their hands two girls whom they force to be conductors. They destroy the Russian border detachment. Only Ensign Maryin survived. He alone has to prevent diversion.

== Cast ==
- Aleksandr Pankratov-Chyorny as Ivan Maryin
- Boris Khmelnitsky as Pin
- Yelena Kondulainen as Oksana
- Viktor Pavlov as Andrey Nikolayevich Sablin
- Vladimir Treshchalov as Petr Yefimovich
- Dzhamilya Agamuradova as Dzhamilya
- Mulkoman Orazov as Kamal Tatabekov
- Vladimir Episkoposyan as Ali
- Vyacheslav Ilin as Pavel Pechyonkin (as V. Ilin)
