= The Ballad of the Valiant Knight Ivanhoe =

Ballad of the Valiant Knight Ivanhoe
- Russian poster
- Directed by: Sergei Tarasov
- Written by: Leonid Nekhoroshev; Walter Scott (novel)
- Starring: Tamara Akulova; Peteris Gaudins; Boris Khimichev; Leonid Kulagin; Romualds Ancans; Boris Khmelnitsky
- Cinematography: Roman Veseler
- Music by: Igor Kantyukov
- Production company: Mosfilm
- Release date: 1982
- Running time: 92 minutes
- Country: Soviet Union
- Language: Russian

Ballad of the Valiant Knight Ivanhoe (Russian: Баллада о доблестном рыцаре Айвенго, romanized: Ballada o doblestnom rytsare Ayvengo) is a 1983 Soviet adventure film, based on the 1819 novel Ivanhoe by Walter Scott. It reached the 9th place in Soviet box office distribution of 1983 with 28.4 million viewers.

== Plot ==
12th century, England. The Knight Commander of the Order of the Templars, Brian de Boisguillebert, rides up to the night fire, near which the Saxon feudal lord Cedric of Rotherwood has settled with his retinue and niece Lady Rowena. Cedric gives him a place near the fire, as well as an approaching pilgrim who has returned from the Holy Land. During the conversation between Cedric and Boisguillebert, it turns out that both of them are going to the tournament in Ashby. Boisguillebert talks about his participation in the Crusade and boasts that the Templars were the strongest in the army of the Crusaders. The pilgrim objects and tells of three knights who defeated the Templars in the tournament. The pilgrim names two, but says that he does not remember the name of the third. Then Boisguillebert admits that the knight defeated him, and the knight is called Ivanhoe, who is also the son of Cedric. Boisguillebert declares that next time he will definitely defeat Ivanhoe.

== Production ==
The filming took place in Khotyn Fortress and Kamianets-Podilskyi Castle. The movie features songs originally written and performed by Vladimir Vysotsky for the 1975 Soviet film The Arrows of Robin Hood, but removed from the latter for political reasons.

The selection of dogs for the film was carried out by Igor Levin (now known as Daniel Levin after immigrating to the United States). Igor Levin, a science teacher and a respected dog judge in Chernivtsi, Ukraine, was recommended to Mosfilm by the Chernivtsi Service Dog Club and the Chernivtsi Hunting Club for his expertise. To ensure historical accuracy, he advised that hunting dogs be used. As a result, ten dogs were chosen, including a mix of Borzois (Russian Wolfhounds), Fox Terriers, Irish Setters, and a black Great Dane named Grant, who appeared in several scenes.

== Cast ==
- Tamara Akulova as Lady Rowena
- Peteris Gaudins as Ivanhoe
- Boris Khimichev as Brian De Bois-Guilbert
- Leonid Kulagin as Cedric the Saxon
- Romualds Ancans as Richard the Lionheart
- Boris Khmelnitsky as Robin Hood
- Yuri Smirnov as Friar Tuck
- Aleksandr Filippenko as Wamba
- Vitautas Tomkus as Reginald Front-de-Boeuf
- Algimantas Masiulis as Prince John
- Nikolay Dupak as Prior Aymer
- Maya Bulgakova as Ulrica
- Oleg Fedulov as Knight
- Vladimir Talashko as Messenger
- Grigory Lyampe as Isaac
