= Irina Ratushinskaya =

Russian writer

- Ирина Борисовна Ратушинская
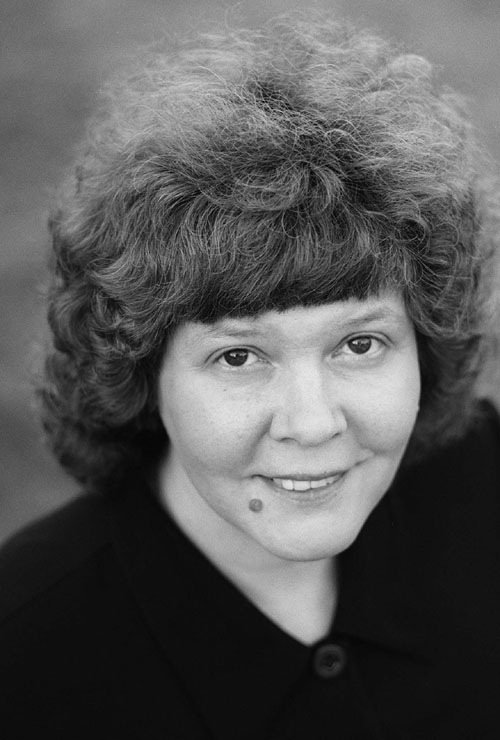
- Irina Ratushinskaya. Photo by Mikhail Evstafiev
- Born: Irina Borisovna Ratushinskaya; 4 March 1954; Odesa, Ukrainian SSR (now Ukraine)
- Died: 5 July 2017 (aged 63); Moscow, Russian Federation
- Citizenship: Soviet Union (1954–1987), Russian Federation (1991–2017)
- Education: Odesa University
- Occupations: poet, writer, screenwriter
- Known for: human rights activism
- Movement: dissident movement in the Soviet Union

Irina Borisovna Ratushinskaya (Russian: Ири́на Бори́совна Ратуши́нская; Ukrainian: Ірина Борисівна Ратушинська, romanized: Iryna Borysivna Ratushynska, 4 March 1954, Odesa – 5 July 2017, Moscow) was a Russian Soviet dissident, poet and writer.

== Biography ==
Irina Ratushinskaya was born in Odesa, Ukraine on 4 March 1954. Her father, Boris Leonidovich Ratushinsky, was an engineer; her mother, Irina Valentinovna Ratushinskaya, was a teacher of Russian literature. Irina had one sister. Her mother's family originated from Poland: her maternal great-grandfather was deported from Poland to Siberia, shortly after the January 1863 Uprising against forced conscription into the Russian Imperial Army.

Ratushinskaya was educated at Odesa University and graduated with a master's degree in physics in 1976. Before and after her graduation she taught from 1975 to 1978 at a primary school in her native Odesa.

=== Political persecution ===
On 17 September 1982 Ratushinskaya was arrested and accused of anti-Soviet agitation for writing and circulating her collections of verse.

Between 1 and 3 March 1983, she was tried in Kyiv and convicted of "agitation carried on for the purpose of subverting or weakening the Soviet regime" (Article 62). Ratushinskaya received the maximum sentence of seven years in a strict-regime labor camp, followed by five years of internal exile. After being imprisoned three and a half years, including one year in solitary confinement in an unheated cell while temperatures fell to minus 40C in the winter, she was released on 9 October 1986, on the eve of the summit in Reykjavík, Iceland between President Ronald Reagan and Mikhail Gorbachev.

While imprisoned Ratushinskaya continued to write poetry. Her previous works usually centered on love, Christian theology, and artistic creation, not on politics or policies as her accusers stated. Her new works that were written in prison, which were written with a matchstick on soap until memorized and then washed away, number some 250. They expressed an appreciation for human rights; liberty, freedom, and the beauty of life. Her memoir, Grey is the Colour of Hope, chronicles her prison experience. Her later poems recount her struggles to endure the hardships and horrors of prison life. Ratushinskaya was a member of International PEN, who monitored her situation during her incarceration.

=== Exile ===
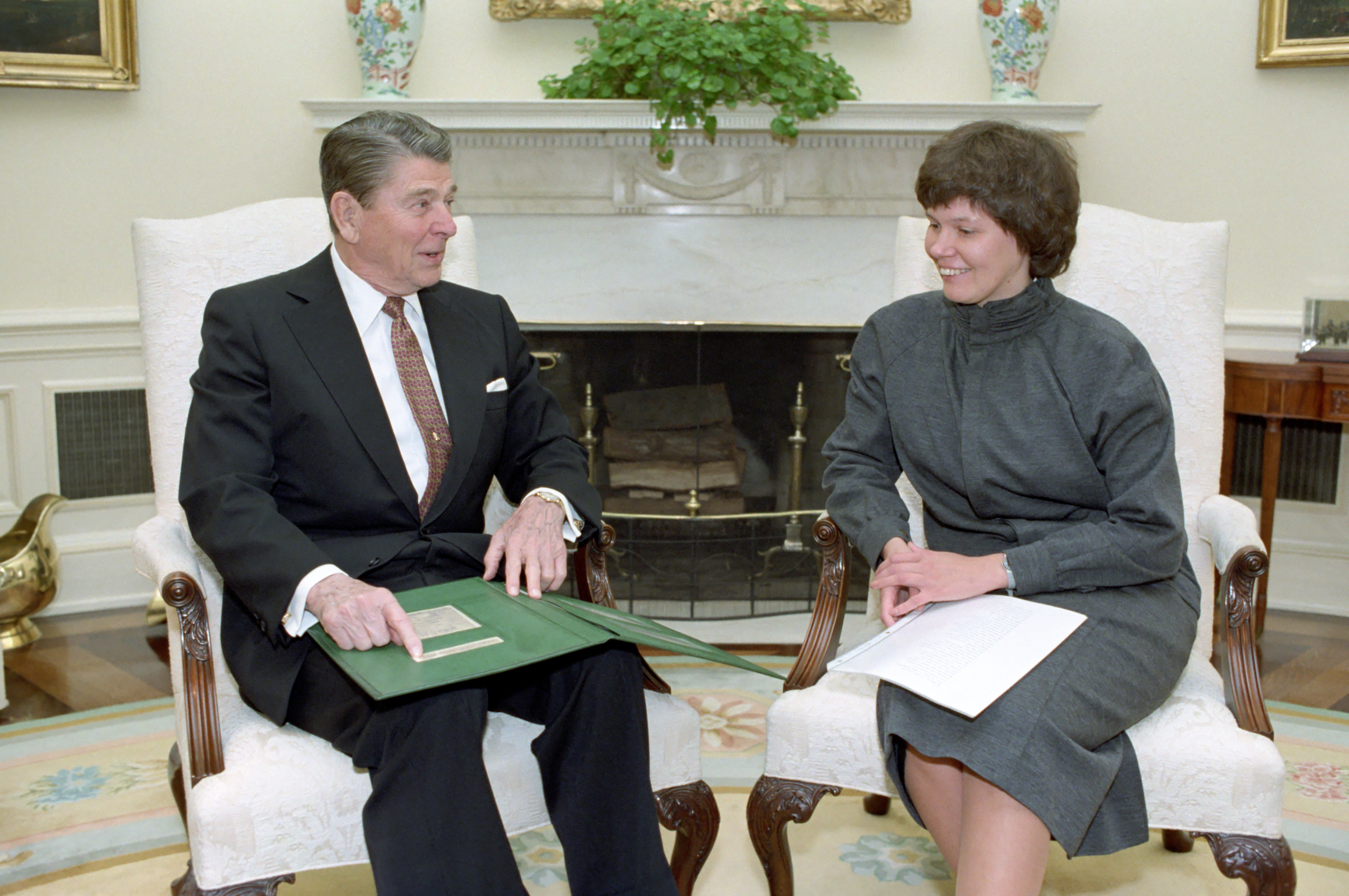
U.S. President Ronald Reagan Meeting with Irina Ratushinskaya in 1987

In 1987, Ratushinskaya moved to the United States, where she received the Religious Freedom Award of the Institute on Religion and Democracy. In the same year the Politburo deprived both Irina and her husband of their Soviet citizenship. She was Poet-in-Residence at Northwestern University in Illinois (USA) from 1987 to 1989. For the next ten years Ratushinskaya lived in London, UK, until December 1998, when the family returned to Russia to educate their seven-year-old twins in Russian schools. Irina and her husband Igor had spent one year undergoing various procedures to regain their Russian citizenship, including letters and appeals to President Boris Yeltsin.

=== Life in Russia ===
In Russia, Ratushinskaya continued to write, including least scripts for sitcoms, and give occasional poetry readings.

Ratushinskaya died in Moscow on 5 July 2017 from cancer. She was survived by her husband, human rights activist Igor Gerashchenko, and their two sons. Memorial events were held for Irina in Moscow and other cities of Russia, including in Chelyabinsk in August 2019.

== Legacy ==
Ratushinskaya's life has had a long-lasting impact on many throughout the world, serving as a source of spiritual inspiration. Her books have been translated into English, German, French, Japanese and other languages and published in many countries.

A Russian edition of Grey is the Colour of Hope was to be launched at the Museum of the Gulag history in Moscow in January 2019. Meanwhile, the 7-lesson English course Ratushinskaya wrote has been enhanced by her son Oleg and turned into a broad range of courses for children, teens, students and adults. They have been taught in Russia and China. In January 2025, her youngest son, Oleg, adopted Irina`s surname, Ratushinsky.

== Books ==
- Poems/Cтихи/Poèmes (1984), Hermitage. ISBN 0-938920-54-5.
- A Tale of Three Heads / сказка о трех головах (1986), Hermitage. ISBN 0-938920-83-9.
- No, I'm Not Afraid (1986) trans David McDuff, Bloodaxe. ISBN 0-906427-95-9.
- Beyond the Limit (1987) trans. Frances Padorr Brent and Carol J. Avins, Northwestern University. ISBN 0-8101-0748-1.
- Pencil Letter (1989) trans. various, Bloodaxe/Hutchinson, UK ISBN 1-85224-050-4; Alfred A. Knopf, USA. ISBN 0-394-57170-3.
- Grey Is the Color of Hope (1989), Sceptre, UK ISBN 978-1-4736-3722-1 Vintage, USA. ISBN 0-679-72447-8.
- In the Beginning (1991), Sceptre. ISBN 978-1-4736-3724-5.
- Dance With a Shadow (1992) trans. David McDuff, 1992, Bloodaxe. ISBN 1-85224-232-9.
- The Odessans (1996), Sceptre. ISBN 978-1-4736-3726-9.
- Fictions and Lies (1999) trans. Alyona Kojevnikova, Sceptre. ISBN 978-1-4736-3728-3.
- Wind of the Journey (2000), Cornerstone Press, Chicago. ISBN 0-940895-44-7.

== Adaptations ==
- Sally Beamish has set some of her poems into music (No, I'm not afraid, 1998).

Irina Leskova set her poems into songs

== Unpublished works ==
Not all of Ratushinskaya's works have been published.

In 1996, the family set off for a vacation in Greece together with their two sons (aged 4 at the time), family friends and their two children (aged 6 and 8). The mothers took turns looking after all 4 children, and Irina's way of keeping all of them somewhat disciplined and entertained was manifested in a series of stories she invented about the adventures of a naughty girl called Cinderella, who wore shoes size 45 and enjoyed robbing banks together with the naughty prince of Bencionia, and giving a headache to the strict King Bencione. The series was loved by all four of the children who, eager to hear what was to happen next, were glad to do as they were told. Eventually, the storytelling was attended by the other 3 parents, who loved the series, particularly after hearing of Cinderella and the prince's vacation in Cuba, where they shaved Fidel Castro bald in his sleep. The series were told but never written down by Irina.

A play 'Борцу не больно' (the wrestler does not hurt) was written in 2 parts for a film on sambo, however, it was not used in the film, apart from some of the character's names.

Ratushinskaya died of cancer before she could finish her last novel, Azor's paw. The 13 written chapters are kept by her family, the first chapter being translated to English by her son Oleg at Irina's final request for him.
