= Savva Kulish =

Soviet film director

- Born: 17 October 1936; Odessa, Ukrainian SSR, USSR (now Ukraine)
- Died: 9 June 2001 (aged 64); Yaroslavl, Russia
- Occupations: Film director Screenwriter
- Years active: 1959—2001

Savva Yakovlevich Kulish (Russian: Са́вва Я́ковлевич Кули́ш; 17 October 1936 – 9 June 2001) was a Soviet film director and screenwriter. He directed eight films between 1966 and 1994. His 1979 film Takeoff won the Silver Prize at the 11th Moscow International Film Festival. He was awarded with the People's Artist of Russia in 1995.

== Selected filmography ==
- Dead Season (1968) — director
- Takeoff (1979) — director
- Fairy tales... fairy tales... fairy tales of the old Arbat (1982) — director, screenwriter
- Fouetté (1986) — screenwriter
- Tragedy, Rock Style (1988) — director, screenwriter
- Stalin's Funeral (1990) — actor
