= World of Watches =

Media franchise

The World of Watches (Russian: Вселенная «Дозоров», Vselennaya "Dozorov") is a media franchise consisting of six novels, several short stories, two films and two video games based on a fictional world created by Russian author Sergei Lukyanenko. Another Russian writer Vladimir Vasilyev is co-author of Day Watch and author of Face of Black Palmyra.

== List of works ==
=== Novels ===
1. Night Watch
2. Day Watch
3. Face of Black Palmyra
4. Twilight Watch
5. Final Watch
6. New Watch
7. Sixth Watch

=== Films ===
- Night Watch (2004)
- Day Watch (2006)

=== Video game ===
- Night Watch (2005)
- Day Watch (2007)
