= Day Watch =

Day Watch may refer to:

- Day Watch (novel), a fantasy novel by Russian authors Sergey Lukyanenko and Vladimir Vasilyev
- Day Watch (video game), a 2007 tactical role-playing game
- Day Watch (film), a 2006 Russian dark fantasy action film
