= Victory or death =

Motto or battle cry

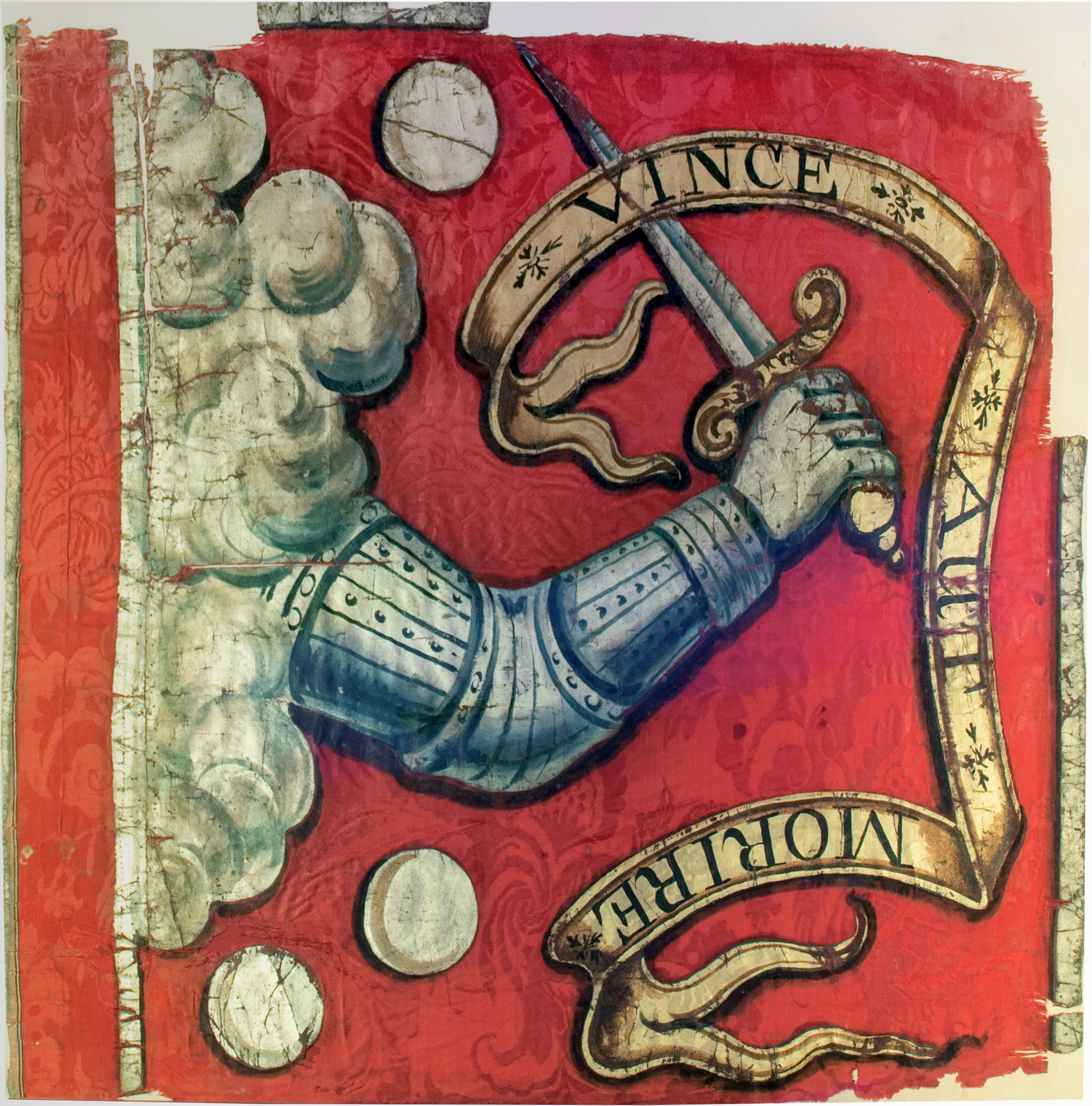
The Bedford Flag: Vince aut morire ("conquer or die")

"Victory or death" and its equivalents, is used as a motto or battle cry.

== Military ==
- Scipio Africanus used the phrase Victory or death in a speech before the battle of Zama.
- A boxer Agathos Daimon died in ancient Olympia aged 35, having promised Zeus ἢ στέφος ἢ θάνατον ("victory or death").
- The Bedford Flag, possibly the oldest extant battle flag of the American Revolution, bears the motto Vincere aut mori ("To conquer or die")
- Before Washington's crossing of the Delaware River at the Battle of Trenton in 1776, "Victory" was the password and "Or Death" was the response.
- The Maniots used "Victory or Death" as their motto when they joined the Greek War of Independence against the Ottoman Empire in 1821.
- The Himno de Riego, which was the Spanish anthem during the Trienio Liberal, the First and Second Spanish Republic ends with Vencer o Morir ("Victory or Death" in Spanish) in its refrain.
- The letter written by commander William Barret Travis "To the People of Texas & All Americans in the World" during the Battle of the Alamo (1836), ends with "Victory or Death!".
- The 32nd Cavalry Regiment of the United States Army has the motto "Victory or Death" .
  - The 1960 film G.I. Blues features the regimental emblem as Elvis Presley had served with them in 1958–60.
  - The 1986 film Ferris Bueller's Day Off features a black beret bearing the regiment's emblem.
  - Axl Rose of Guns N' Roses has the regiment's emblem and motto tattooed on his left arm.
- The 442 Field Artillery Battalion of the US Army have the motto Victoria laeta aut mors ("Glorious victory or death")
- The Chilean Navy has the motto Vencer o Morir ("Victory or Death" in Spanish).
- It was used as a battle cry in medieval Muslim battles and conquests.

It is the name of a gun battery on the main gun deck of the U.S.S. Constitution.

== Heraldic motto ==
It is given as the translation of the heraldic motto of several Irish clans and Scottish clans :

- Clan Gallagher – Buaidh nó Bás ("Victory or death")
- Clan MacDougall – Buaidh no Bàs ("Victory or death")
- Clan MacNeil – Buaidh no Bàs ("Victory or death")
- Clan Macdowall – Vincere vel mori ("To conquer or die")
- Clan Maclaine of Lochbuie – Vincere vel mori ("To conquer or die")
- Clan McCabe – Vincere vel mori ("To conquer or die")
- Irish clan Murphy of Wexford and Cork uses Vincere vel mori ("To conquer or die")
- The Clifton family of Lytham uses Mortem aut triumphum ("Death or victory")

== In fiction ==
- In Mass Effect the Krogan word "korbal" is roughly translated to "Victory or Death".
- In the 1984 film The Last Starfighter, the phrase is chanted by the starfighters.
- In the Warcraft universe, "Lok'tar ogar!" (Victory or Death!) is the battlecry of the Horde.
- In Hearthstone, it is said by Garrosh in the beginning of games.
- In Guild Wars, "Victory or Death" was the name of a skill in Guild versus Guild battles. In Guild Wars 2, it is the title of the final story quest.
- In Warhammer 40,000, "Victorus aut Mortis" is the war cry of the Raven Guard chapter of Space Marines.
- In the 2001 film Enemy at the Gates and 2003 video game Call of Duty, "Victory or Death" is a common slogan for Red Army Political Commissars.
- A trailer for the series finale of the animated series Samurai Jack mentions this phrase.
- In Voltron: Legendary Defender, "Victory or Death" is one of the two war cries of the Galra.
- The series finale of Star Wars: The Clone Wars, titled "Victory and Death", is named similarly to this expression.
- Destiny 2 features the weapon Skyburner’s Oath which carries flavor text which reads “The inscription, written in a Cabal dialect, reads: "Victory or death!"”
- The 2025 crime fiction anthology Crime Ink: Iconic includes a short story titled “Victory or Death”.

== See also ==
- Victory
- Death
- Death or Glory (disambiguation)
