= Twilight Watch =

2004 novel by Sergey Lukyanenko

- Russian 1st edition
- Author: Sergei Lukyanenko
- Original title: Сумеречный Дозор
- Translator: Andrew Bromfield
- Language: Russian
- Series: World of Watches
- Genre: Horror/Fantasy
- Publication date: 2004
- Publication place: Russia
- English publication date: 2007
- Preceded by: Day Watch
- Followed by: Last Watch

Twilight Watch (Russian: «Сумеречный Дозор», also known as Dusk Watch) is a fantasy novel by Russian writer Sergey Lukyanenko published in 2004. It is the sequel to Night Watch and Day Watch and the third part of a saga that continues with Last Watch and New Watch and concludes with Sixth Watch.

Heinemann published an English-language edition, translated by Andrew Bromfield.

== Structure and style ==
Lukyanenko returns to a structure closer to that he used in the Night Watch novel than the Day Watch novel. Twilight Watch is divided into three stories- Nobody's Time, Nobody's Space, and Nobody's Power. Each story begins with a prologue followed by seven numbered chapters and concluding with an Epilogue. Except for the prologues, the events of each story are written in a first person narrative using the voice of the Light Magician character Anton Gorodetsky, a member of Night Watch. Events in each of the prologues are written in a third person narrative and take place entirely outside of Gordetsky's presence. The entire novel is written in the past tense.

== Plot ==
Among us live the Others. They are humans who can enter the Twilight, a shadowy world that exists alongside our real world, and gain unnatural powers from it. As long as they are in the Twilight, Others are drained of their life essence and may be consumed if they remain in it for too long. Others are made up of two distinct groups - the Light Others and Dark Others. A long time ago, the Light and Dark others fought a fierce battle in which neither side could win. In the end, both sides signed a Great Treaty - a set of laws which would govern them and the use of powers. Light Others created Night Watch, to ensure that the Dark Others wouldn't break the Treaty while Dark Others created Day Watch, to watch the Light Others as well. Both sides answer to the Inquisition—an organization which ensures that neither of the two sides become too powerful.

The book is separated into three novellas:

=== Nobody's Time ===
Anton Gorodetsky is assigned by Gesser to investigate mysterious warning letters sent to both the Watches and the Inquisition. In the letters, a powerful Great Light Other promises a human that they will turn him into an 'Other', which the human deeply desires. However, as far as the Others are concerned this is impossible and as such, the Light Other is in danger because refusal to fulfill this human's request means that he or she will dematerialise in the Twilight.

Anton is assigned the case and goes to the Assol, a rich district in Moscow where the letters came from. Vampire Kostya Saushkin from the Day Watch has also been assigned to the case, along with Edgar and Vitezislav from the Inquisition. Anton discovers that the human is a 60-year-old businessman, the son of Gesser. The four confront Gesser about making the promise to turn his son into an Other, but Gesser denies even knowing his son was alive. It is then revealed that his son is a potential Other for whom Gesser claims the right to initiate. It is revealed later in the book that the witch, Arina, used the book of Fuaran to transform Gesser's son into an Other.

=== Nobody's Space ===
Anton joins his wife Svetlana (who left the Night Watch), her mother, and their daughter (Nadya) on a vacation in a remote area. Whilst there, he learns of an incident where werewolves tried to attack two human children but who were saved by a mysterious woman living in the forest. Anton magically reads the older girl's memory, and notices that she saw a book titled "Fuaran" on the shelf. Anton can hardly believe it, as Fuaran is a legendary and extremely powerful artifact, believed to be lost ages ago or maybe never to have existed at all. According to stories, the book, written by an ancient witch (named Fuaran) contains a spell able to turn an ordinary human into an Other.

Anton finds the witch's cottage and the witch, Arina, who turns out to be level 1 or higher, but not Fuaran. Instead, all Anton finds is a book about the legend of Fuaran which is co-authored by Arina. The book explains how Fuaran discovered how to raise the power of an Other, and grant a human the powers of an Other. According to the book, the average magical temperature of the world was 97 degrees, while humans had a magical temperature of 97 or higher. Their warmth is fed into their surroundings, while the Others have a magical temperature under 97, and thus soak up the 'warmth' that surrounded them. The lower an Other's magical temperature, the more they soaked up. Seventh level Others had a magical temperature of about 90, while Others without Classification were in the 40s. The rarest type of other is one who had no magical temperature at all, a Zero Other, whose power was near limitless due to the fact they only absorbed magic. After a talk with Svetlana, Anton discovers Nadya is an absolute Zero Other.

Later, as Anton is relaxing in a hammock, he opens his eyes to find Edgar (an Inquisitor) standing over him. Edgar explains to Anton that Arina was wanted for questioning. In turns out the witch played a major role in a joint Watch experiment to create the perfect socialist state in the 20s. Arina was meant to put a potion in the bread that, over time, would cause whoever ate it to fully believe in newly arising government. Instead, all the subjects were turned quickly to the cause, which lead to the downfall of the government and the death of nearly all the subjects, supposedly due to Arina's act of sabotage.

Confronted by Anton and Edgar, Arina dives into the fourth level of the twilight, where it takes time before the pair manage to follow her, only to find that she had escaped. Edgar and Anton return to the real world and decide that it would not be smart to search a Higher Other's house, as Arina had proven herself to be. Having lost their target, the duo split ways, Edgar to get backup in order to find the witch and Anton to return to his family.

Once back home Sveta and Anton learn that while Sveta's mother was out in the forest with their daughter, her 'old friend' took their daughter for a walk. Sveta and Anton knew instantly it was Arina, and through magical means contact her. The Inquisition had erected a dome to stop the witch from escaping, and she was holding Nadya hostage with demands that they find her a means to escape.

After Sveta sends out magical means to search for Nadya (which nearly blew Anton away) and discovers nothing, the werewolves, who had felt Sveta's power and were afraid she would come after them, showed up. It turned out to be a man in his twenties with three children. They admitted having seen where Arina took Nadya and agreed that as long as they were pardoned for hunting the children, they would help track down and fight Arina.

In the end, after a battle between Arina and a very angry Sveta, Nadya is saved, and with no deaths. Sveta, who traveled to Arina via the fifth level of the twilight, seemed changed, as though she had a new understanding on life. After forcing Arina to agree not to hurt any human or Other unless in self-defense, Sveta agreed to help her find a means to leave.

=== Nobody's Power ===
Anton later travels to Moscow in order to talk to Gesar, at which point Gesar receives a phone call, asking him to go to the witches hut, where Anton had only just been. After traveling there with Anton through magical means, they meet Kostya, Edgar, Zabulon and Svetlana. Vitezoslav's ashes have been found in a hidden room with no indication of who could have killed him, except that it would have to be someone powerful, as Vitezoslav was a Higher Vampire. At first, they suspect Arina. However, it soon turns out that the Other who killed Vitezoslav and took the book is Kostya, who himself became a Higher Vampire after drinking a blood cocktail made from donors in order to raise a vampire to this max potential.

Originally, Vitezoslav found the book and phoned Edgar, who didn't believe the vampire had found the actual book of Fuaran. But Kostya wasn't convinced the book was a fake and joined Vitezoslav at the hut. The Inquisitor wanted to see if the book actually worked and tried it on Kostya, using his cocktail of a blood mixture made from 12 donors, increasing his powers exponentially, after which Kostya challenged Vitezoslav to a vampire duel. The loser of such a duel is ashed.

His ultimate goal is to travel to the International Space Station and read the book while looking at the Earth from orbit (the spell of Fuaran works on everyone in the caster's range of sight), turning all humans into Others, so at last he will not be different from the rest. All but Kostya realize that this will be a disaster - "you step on someone's foot in a tram, he curses at you; now he can incinerate you." Also, what most Others do not realize is that it is, in fact, humans who emit magical energy. The Others absorb it more than they emit, allowing them to use it. The magic level of an Other depends on the absorb/emit ratio. There were several "zero" Others in history: Jesus (Yehoshua), Merlin, and Anton and Svetlana's daughter, Nadya. Their power is nearly unlimited as all they do is absorb magic. If Kostya manages to turn all humans into Others, the amount of magic energy available will drastically decrease.

To demonstrate the effectiveness of "Fuaran" to Anton, he uses it on a human, turning him into a low-level Other. What neither Kostya nor Anton realized at the moment was that Anton was affected too - as he was standing right in front of Kostya - turning him into a mage without classification (Gesser/Zabulon/Sveta's level). Kostya makes it to the Baikonur Cosmodrome and mind-controls the humans there to suit him up for the rocket launch. Anton catches up and confronts him, with Gesar, Zabulon, and Edgar all linked to his mind, and feeding him energy from everyone they have the right to leach it from. Each is telling him to use a different destructive spell on the vampire.

They realize that Kostya is not planning to steal a rocket, as not even the Higher Vampire is capable of launching a rocket into orbit by himself. He is instead planning to open a portal to the space station. As a precaution, he is still putting on a spacesuit. However, when Kostya was about to open the portal, Anton took all the energy channeled into him by Gesar, Zabulon, and Edgar and spent it to create a shield around himself in order to shield his thoughts from Kostya.

What Anton did not want the vampire to realize was that because Kostya was an Other (an Other without classification to boot), he would not be able to perform any magic in the vast emptiness of space. There would be no energy there from which he could draw on, in space he was separated from the source of all Others' energy. Kostya, assuming the shield was put up because Anton was afraid and wanted to protect himself from harm, expressed his surprise at such an act of cowardice and opened the portal. Only when the vampire stepped through it did Anton relax - the threat was over. It takes thousands of calculations to put a rocket into orbit. He knew that Kostya could not possibly calculate the exact position of the station. The portal deposited Kostya into orbit, leaving him to float in his spacesuit, unable to perform any magic. He could not make a corrective teleport into the space station - he could not open a portal back to the planet. He could only remain in orbit as that orbit decayed and he ended up burning up in the atmosphere upon re-entry, along with the book.

With the death of Kostya and others in the recent past, the Day Watch in Moscow is down to one Higher Level Magician (Zavulon) while The Night watch in Moscow has four (Gesar/Olga/Sveta/Anton).

== Characters ==
=== Light Others ===
- Anton Gorodetsky
- Gesser
- Svetlana
- Nadya Gorodetskaya
- Olga
- Semyon
- Bear
- Ignat
- Garik
- Las

=== Dark Others ===
- Zavulon
- Kostya Saushkin
- Arina

=== Inquisition ===
- Edgar
- Witezislav

== Adaptation ==
Twilight Watch was scheduled to be adapted into a film, in line with the film adaptations from the first novel: Night Watch and Day Watch.
