= The Witcher of Grand Kiev =

Series of short stories by Vladimir Vasilyev

- The 2003 edition's cover
- Author: Vladimir Vasilyev
- Original title: Ведьмак из Большого Киева
- Country: Russia
- Language: Russian
- Genre: Technofantasy (cyberpunk fantasy)
- Publisher: AST
- Published: 1997

The Witcher of Grand Kiev (Russian: Ведьмак из Большого Киева, romanized: Vedmak iz Bolshogo Kieva) is a series of short stories of the genre of technofantasy (cyberpunk fantasy), written by Vladimir Vasilyev, a Russian author of Ukrainian origin. It is a parody of The Witcher series by Andrzej Sapkowski, which has the approval of Sapkowski.

In 2003, the literary series was awarded the Golden Caduceus (1st place) by the international fiction festival "Star Bridge" in the nomination "Cycles, series and novels with a sequel". Also, the titular story "Witcher of Grand Kiev" got in 2000 both prizes of the Urania festival: the Greater Urania from readers and the Lasser Urania from writers.

== Stories ==
- The Technician of Grand Kiev («Техник Большого Киева», 1997)
- The Witcher of Grand Kiev («Ведьмак из Большого Киева», 1999)
- Duty, Honor and Taimas («Долг, честь и taimas», 2000)
- Price Issue («Вопрос цены», 2001)
- Motherland of Indifference («Родина безразличия», 2002)
- Nanny («Нянька», 2003)
- Artificial Selection («Искусственный отбор», 2003)
- No Past (2006)
- Matador («Матадор», 2007)
- Unscheduled Train («Поезд вне расписания», 2009)
- Witcher's Word («Ведьмачье слово», 2009)
- Colors of the Truce («Цвета перемирия», 2013)
- Very Big Moscow («Очень Большая Москва», 2017)
- Night Sky Herald («Вестник ночного неба», 2022)

== World of Grand Kiev ==
In the universe of stories, the planet Earth, inhabited not only by homo sapiens, collided with a large celestial body.

After the catastrophe, the world is divided into large cities and independent closed autonomous territories between them. Humans, elves, orcs, and other intelligent races coexist relatively peacefully. Magic and science intertwined, living machines appeared, and the leading role in society was taken by "technicians" who have knowledge and skills to handle these machines.

One of megacities under leadership of technicians is Kyiv, which spreads over the entire area of continental Ukraine, bypassing only the Crimea.

Over time, useful living technology began to go out of control: intelligent machines unattended turned into bloodthirsty monsters, elsewhere began to reproduce spontaneously in abandoned factories. The problem became so great that Arzamas-6, a school of witchers, was created. Trained witchers exterminate mechanical beasts for a fee, half of which is given to their training center.

== See also ==
- The Witcher
- Vedmak
- Shadowrun
