= Mariya Poroshina =

Russian stage and film actress (born 1973)

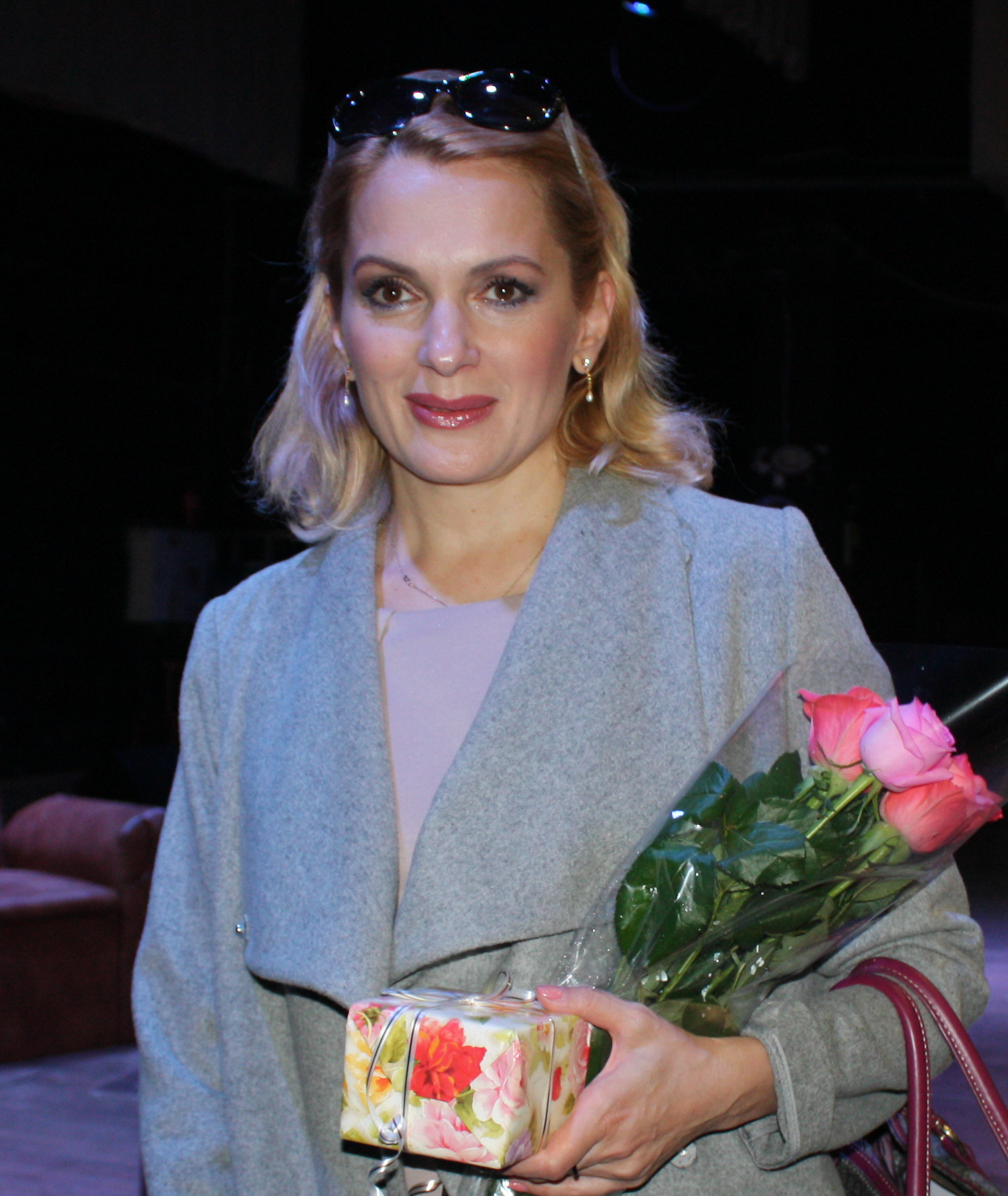
- Poroshina in 2016
- Born: Mariya Mikhailovna Poroshina; 1 November 1973 (age 52); Moscow, Russian SFSR, Soviet Union
- Citizenship: Russian
- Occupation: Actress
- Years active: 1997–present
- Spouse(s): Gosha Kutsenko (1992 – 1997; divorced); Ilya Drevnov (2009 – 2018; divorced)
- Children: 5

Mariya Mikhailovna Poroshina (Russian: Мария Михайловна Порошина, born 1 November 1973) is a Russian actress.

== Biography ==
Mariya Poroshina was born on 1 November 1973, into a family of actors. Her mother, Natalia Petrovna Krasnoyarskaya, now director at Bolshoi Theater, learned classical singing and performed romance) and period songs. Her father, Mikhaïl Ivanovitch Poroshin, was a soloist in the famous "Ensemble Berezka". Her grandmother was an opera singer. Poroshina's parents divorced, and her mother remarries actor Dmitri Nazarov. He gets along well with his adopted daughter, checks her homework and questions her. She then has little free time. She studied at school n ° 59 (now 1286), specializing in the study of French, and learned to dance within the troupe of the "Ensemble Berezka".

At the end of her studies, Maria enrolled at the Moscow Art Theatre School, which she left after a year to join the Boris Shchukin Theatre Institute.She directs the program "Expand the circle", plays in various productions of the classical and contemporary repertoire, notably at the Pokrovka Theater, under the direction of Sergei Artsibachev. Maria is currently part of Sergei Vinogradov's theater troupe, "THE THEATER", where she begins by playing the role of "Chloé" in the play by Boris Vian, Froth on the Daydream.

Porochina took her first steps in the cinema by playing small roles in television series. It is thanks to that of Tamara in the series entitled The Brigade (2002) and to the main role held in the series Always say: Always (2003) that she knows fame. Then her following main roles on the big screen include, in The 4th Wishes (2003), or, among the fantastic team of Timur Bekmambetov, on the set of Night Watch (2004). In 2005, Poroshina re-assumes the role of the Great Magic Svetlana in the sequel, Day Watch, a film which at the time achieved the most box office entrances.

== Private life ==
Poroshina's first husband is the actor Gosha Kutsenko. Their daughter Polina was born from this union in 1996. In 2007, Polina appeared in the television series "On the way to the heart", and in 2010, with her father, the role of Christine in "La compensation". Poroshina married actor Ilya Drevnov, with whom she has three daughters: Serafima, born in 2005, Agrafena, born on 18 February 2010 and Glafira, born 3 February 2016. They divorced in 2018. She also has a son, Andrei (born 11 January 2019).
