= Last Watch =

2006 novel by Sergei Lukyanenko

- First edition (Russian)
- Author: Sergei Lukyanenko
- Original title: Последний Дозор
- Series: World of Watches
- Genre: Horror/Fantasy
- Publication date: 2006
- Publication place: Russia
- English publication date: 2008
- ISBN: 978-1-4013-0927-5
- OCLC: 181602399
- Preceded by: Twilight Watch
- Followed by: New Watch

Last Watch (Russian: «Последний Дозор», also known as Final Watch) is a fantasy novel by Russian writer Sergey Lukyanenko. It is the sequel to Night Watch, Day Watch, and Twilight Watch and prequel to New Watch and Sixth Watch.

== Background ==
The entire saga is devoted to the Others - humans able to draw on the magical force flowing through the world. They can enter into the Twilight, a shadowy dimension next to our own, from where they also draw power to perform their magic. The Twilight itself is divided into levels, with each level harder to access than the one above it. While every Other may enter the first level, only the most powerful ones can get as far as the fifth, and the select few can get through to the sixth. While the first levels are unpleasant and devoid of life (apart from blue moss in the first level), fifth and sixth levels are quite hospitable, with life and vegetation. The main mystery of the final novel is what is on the seventh level- only the greatest of magicians can penetrate to the seventh level.

The Others are divided into the Light Others and Dark Others. They are opposed to each other and once they were at constant war. After realising that no side is likely to win, and that the world and ordinary people would suffer too much from magical wars, both sides signed a Great Treaty. The Treaty forces both sides to keep the balance on both sides and grants either side the right to an equal act of light or dark if either side uses their power on a human or other, and limits their actions. Light Others created the Night Watch, to make sure that the Dark Ones keep the Treaty while the Dark Others created the Day Watch, to watch the Light Ones. The Inquisition oversees both sides and prevents either side from gaining dominance, because, as noted in the twilight watch, dominance for either side means defeat for Others, serving to punish either side if they violate the treaty. Both sides watch out for potential new Others, whom they can initiate into the use of magic. Each Other must either choose Light or Dark - usually they make their choice the first time they enter the Twilight and neither Watch may influence their decision. The decision, once made, is final except in cases where an Other does an act of enormous light or dark, such as Merlin, or Arina.

The Others live for centuries and can easily influence human minds, making people do their bidding. There are many different ways they can hone their abilities and specialize, both on the sides of Light and Dark. Vampires and werewolves, lowest form of Others, are always Dark and they are the only kind of Others who are able to pass their abilities to ordinary humans - otherwise an Other cannot be made, only born. This is of course, excluding the use of the Fuaran, a powerful magical book, which when used, may turn any number of ordinary humans into potential Others. It is also able to raise the power level of any Other. Others can recharge their strength using human emotions - Light ones from positive emotions, like joy or happiness, and Dark ones from negative ones, like hatred and pain. When a Light Other uses someone's positive emotions, the emotions become weaker. When a Dark Other uses someone's pain or hatred to recharge, those feelings become stronger. Dark Others occasionally choose to remove the cause of the pain or fear from the humans mind (see twilight watch).

The Others' magical powers do not come from extra magic they have. In reality, magical force is produced by ordinary living people, and plants, and life - the Others produce less magic, therefore instead of emitting it, their bodies absorb it, allowing them to use it. The less magic one's body emits, the stronger their magical abilities will be. This knowledge is acquired by entering the fifth level of the Twilight.

The English title of the book is Last Watch and was released on 6 November 2008 in the UK and was scheduled to be released on November 25, 2008, in the U.S./Canada. However, due to a misprint with the US and Canadian copies of the book, Chapter 5 of Book 2 was missing and the book was rescheduled for January 29, 2009.

== Structure and style ==
Last Watch has a very similar structure to Night Watch and Twilight Watch. Last Watch is divided into three stories- Common Cause, A Common Enemy, and A Common Destiny. Each story begins with a prologue followed by six numbered chapters and concluding with an epilogue. Except for the prologues, the events of each story are written in a first person narrative using the voice of the Higher Magician character Anton Gorodetsky, a member of the Night Watch. Events in each of the prologues are written in a third person narrative and take place entirely outside of Gordetsky's presence. The entire novel is written in the past tense.

== Plot summary ==
=== Common Cause ===
Anton Gorodetsky is learning to use his new power when Gesar sends him to assist the Scottish Night Watch in Edinburgh in a murder investigation. A young Russian man has been murdered in a "Vampire Castle", a tourist attraction; the evidence shows that he was apparently killed by a vampire. The mystery is greater than it seems, as someone tries to attack Anton using remote controlled guns.

Finally the head of Scottish Night Watch, Thomas Lermont, reveals that someone stole an artifact from Merlin's grave and is apparently trying to use this artifact to open Merlin's secret storage. In that mysterious place Merlin apparently hid the "Crown of All Things" (nobody knows what it is). After the Night Watch is attacked by ordinary humans equipped with magical amulets and bullets, Thomas and Anton follow someone to the Twilight. They get as far as the sixth level (a first for Anton), but all they find out is that there are three people behind this - a Light Other, a Dark Other and an Inquisitor. Thomas also tells Anton that the seventh level of the Twilight is the Others' paradise, where they can exist in peace together (upon death, Others just vanish into the Twilight). Merlin has hidden the Crown of All Things in the seventh level of the Twilight.

=== A Common Enemy ===
All Others are very worried about these happenings. Gesar sends Anton to Uzbekistan, to look up Rustam, a contemporary and friend of Merlin, and a former friend - later an enemy - of Gesar. He might know something about where the Crown is hidden and what it is. When Anton is visiting the Night Watch in Uzbekistan, they are once again attacked by humans with amulets and magical weapons. Various clues begin to point to Anton's friend, Kostya Saushkin, as one of the perpetrators, even though he is certainly dead.

Anton manages to find Rustam. He tells him that the Crown of All Things is a spell which will destroy the barriers dividing individual levels of the Twilight, as well as the barrier between the Twilight and reality. It might cause the end of the world, strip all Others of their powers or maybe kill them - Rustam doesn't know, nor does he care. They are attacked again and Anton learns that his one-time friend, the Inquisitor Edgar, is one of the mysterious trio of Others.

=== A Common Destiny ===
Back in Moscow, Anton figures out who is the Dark Other in the mysterious trio - it is Gennady Saushkin, Kostya's father. They can't identify the Light Other. Both Watches assign operatives to protect Anton and Svetlana's five-year-old daughter, Nadya, the only zero-level Other in the world (she does not produce any magical energy, she can only absorb, therefore her power is practically unlimited; Merlin was also a zero-level Other), as only zero-level Others may get to the seventh level of the Twilight.

Edgar and Gennady kidnap Anton (they can't get to Nadya) and take him to Edinburgh, so that he can help them figure out a way to get to the Crown. They tell Anton that Nadya is dead due to them planting a nuclear explosive near his apartment building. A nuclear bomb is the only weapon capable of destroying matter on all Twilight levels. Edgar found some information in the archives of the Inquisition saying that the Crown of All Things will give all the Others who departed into the Twilight the thing they want most. In Edgar's interpretation it will bring them back to life, and he wants to reunite with his wife, who was killed. Gennady wants to get his son and wife back.

They meet the third part of the trio, or as they call themselves, the Final Watch - the witch Arina, who managed to change her affiliation to Light. She also reveals that she sabotaged the nuclear bomb not to go off, as her new Light affiliation forbids the destruction of so many innocents. Anton does figure out Merlin's secret, but he knows the Final Watch will not like it and he manages to lie to them. They take him to the fifth level of the Twilight, where they encounter Merlin's guardian. While the Final Watch is busy fighting it, Anton gets to the sixth level. There he meets Merlin as well as Tiger Cub, Igor, Alice and all his Other friends who departed into the Twilight, including Kostya (who tells Anton that he does not blame Anton for killing him). They are all hoping he will activate the Crown. However, he cannot go back, because the Final Watch is there and he cannot go forward to the seventh level, because he doesn't have enough power. At this point Nadya appears - Svetlana just initiated her and sent her to get her father. Traveling through all levels of the Twilight is not a problem for Nadya. She takes Anton forward - back to the real world. The Twilight goes in a circle. The seventh level is the one we all live in.

Anton goes to activate the Crown of All Things, which is indeed hidden in the seventh level. Merlin put the spell in the ancient stones of the Edinburgh Castle. The Final Watch appears, but Anton will not be bothered with them. Edgar got things wrong; the thing the Others in the Twilight want most is not resurrection, but death. There is no paradise there, they are stuck forever in a world where everything is just a pale copy, trapped in an imitation of life. They want it to end, because once they fully die, they can be reborn. Merlin has foreseen this and created his spell (its Twilight-destroying effect is temporary). However, the lost Others asked Anton to forgive, so he allows Gennady and Edgar to die, so that they can join their loved ones before it is too late. Arina chooses to live. Then Anton activates the Crown, and all Others in the Twilight die, including the incapitated Dark Others in the Plain of Demons.

The final words of the book spoken by Anton could be interpreted as a possible hint at new episodes in the series, where Anton says to his daughter "You didn't think this was the last watch, did you?"

== Characters ==
=== Light Others ===
- Anton Gorodetsky (Grand Light Mage) - a member of Night Watch. During the series he went from a low-level mage to a Grand Light Mage. He is fully aware of the nature of the Others, of the way they operate and he's quite cynical about Light Others and their cause (he's not overly keen on Dark Others either). His favorite pastime is listening to randomly arranged custom mini-discs. He is married to Svetlana and has a daughter who is the most powerful Other in the world.
- Boris Ignatyevich/Gesar (Grand Light Mage) - an ancient mage of Tibetan descent who taught a number of heroes and philosophers during his lifetime. He moved to Europe during the early 15th century. Although he has had many opportunities to advance to high-level posts within Night Watch, he chose to remain a regional director of the Moscow division. Gesar is a battle-hardened tactician who's been known to turn devastating defeats into small victories. He cares a great deal about his subordinates, though he doesn't hesitate to put them in harm's way for the sake of greater good. However, Gesar's idea of "greater good" might sometimes be hard to understand.
- Svetlana (Grand Light Sorceress) - a young doctor who became a Grand Light Sorceress. Her powers were severely drained by the Mirror and later restored by the Inquisition. She is currently married to Anton and has a daughter who is the most powerful Other in the world. Svetlana left the Night Watch to save her relationship with Anton - her powers were much greater than his and it was putting big strain on their love. Since then his powers increased to Beyond Categories (i.e. outside the usual 1-7 scale used for Others) and now match her own, but she did not go back.
- Nadezhda Gorodetskaya (Absolute Sorceress) - a five-year-old daughter of Anton and Svetlana. Even at her young age, she's capable of feats few Light Others can match. In spite of the knowledge that comes with such power, she retains childlike innocence, which occasionally results in her using her powers without thinking of the consequences. She is a zero-level Other - she does not emit magic, only absorb. In all the novels, only three more Others had such a level: Jesus and Merlin (Jesus never mentioned as other), and the vampire Kostya Saushkin (after having used the "Fuaran" to increase his magic level). Nadya was intended to be the Light Messiah, with help of Gesar's manipulations with fate. However, due to Zabulon's intrigue, the only Light Other apparently able to be a teacher and mentor to a Messiah, voluntarily defleshed himself. Nadya is still going to become an incredibly powerful Light Sorceress, but it is not certain whether she will actually become Light Messiah.
- Olga (Grand Light Sorceress) - love of Gesar. They have been together for centuries. A human son was born to them who was later turned into a low level Light Other by the magic of the Fuaran. She served as a mentor to Svetlana.
- Semyon (Light Mage) - a crusty, experienced mage with a wryly cynical outlook on the world. Unlike many of his fellow mages, he is a capable fighter even without his magic.
- Foma (Thomas) Lermont (Grand Light Mage) - once known as Thomas the Rhymer, and the ancestor of Lermontov. Head of Scottish Night Watch and friend of Gesar.

=== Dark Others ===
- Zabulon (Grand Dark Mage) - an ancient schemer about the same age as Gesar. His true form has taken on demonic characteristics because he had spent a great deal of time in the Twilight.
- Gennady Saushkin (High Vampire) - father of Kostya Saushkin, once a neighbour of Anton. Gennady was a model vampire, who never hunted and lived on donors' blood. After losing his son and wife (she defleshed herself voluntarily after Kostya's death) Gennady was possessed with idea of revenge against Anton, whom he blamed for everything. He boosted himself to High Vampire (by drinking all the blood of fifty humans) and later joined the Final Watch.
- Galina Dobronravova (Werewolf) — 15-year-old young girl, who helped Anton and saved his life, killed by the bewitched bullets.

=== Unaffiliated ===
- Edgar (High Dark Mage, Inquisitor) - a strong dark mage (1-2 level, later reaching higher status thanks to Arina) that had been recruited to the Day Watch from Estonia. After getting tired of Zabulon's schemes, he joins the Inquisition. While Maxim divorced his wife when he joined the Inquisition, Edgar married a witch. After losing his wife in a car crash, Edgar, obsessed with the idea of getting her back, became a renegade. He found information about the Crown of All and with two other Others created the Final Watch to get to it. Edgar will stop at nothing if he believes it will get him to his goal.
- Arina (Grand Light Healer) - once an extremely powerful Dark Witch. She was involved in an experiment intended to create a perfect society, organised by both Watches together with the Inquisition, but she sabotaged it, together with an unknown Light Mage, who is most likely Gesar (it was hinted that it is Gesar in his conversations with Anton in the Twilight Watch). Then she put herself to sleep for several decades, to wait out the hunt. Arina does most of her magic using plants and herbs. Though she chose Darkness, she is not evil and does not like to hurt people. After events in the Twilight Watch Arina became the second Other in history to change affiliation when she switched to Light. For idealistic reasons she became the leader of the Final Watch.
- Rustam (Grand Light Mage) - Rustam is an ancient mage, a contemporary of Merlin, with whom he was friends. He was also a close friend of Gesar once, but they fell out later. Rustam finally became a recluse, after he lost interest in the world. He moved permanently to the Twilight (but he did not disperse in it), visiting the reality only occasionally - for those purposes he borrows the body of Afandi, a relatively low-level old Other he once initiated. Rustam lives close to the Plain of Demons, a place where once he and Gesar fought a war against Dark Others and used a spell so terrible that no one ever dared to use it since. That spell caused disruption in all levels of the Twilight, causing the opposing mages not to vanish into the Twilight, but to turn to stone in the real world, remaining alive but immobile and without any senses. They are still there.
- Merlin - one of the few zero-level mages who ever lived. He left many artifacts and spells, including the one Gesar and Rustam used on the Plain of Demons. He was the only Other who changed his affiliation (going from Light to Dark), until Arina. Apart from other artifacts and spells, he left behind the Crown of All Things, hidden in the deepest level of the Twilight and protected by carefully set obstacles and guardians.

== Movie references ==
This book is notable for being the only book in the hexalogy so far to reference the Watch movies (see Night Watch):

- In the movie, when Semyon, Tiger Cub and Bear go to help Anton with the vampires in their yellow truck, they nearly run over Zabulon. The latter throws the truck over him, then it hits the road and keeps going. In the book, Semyon says he saw the same thing in his dream, but doesn't remember who was with him or where he was going, only that they were in "some old van".
- In the movie, Egor is Anton's son. In the book, when Anton meets Egor on a plane, Egor says he saw Anton as his father in a dream, and that later he joined the Day Watch just to spite him, which covers the overall plot of both movies. Anton then mentions dreams are sometimes visions from other dimensions.
- In the movie, the Night Watch's cover is the City Light Company (in Russian "Gorsvet"). In the book, Gesar mentions during a staff meeting, an old cover the Night Watch once had which was in fact the City Light Company/Gorsvet.

== See also ==
- Characters in the Night Watch Universe
