= Dmitry Martynov =

Russian actor (born 1991)

Dmitriy Martynov
- Born: November 21, 1991 (age 34); Moscow, Russian SFSR, USSR
- Occupation: Actor
- Years active: 2004-2012

Dmitriy Aleksandrovich Martynov (Russian: Дмитрий Александрович Мартынов; born November 21, 1991) is a Russian actor. His breakthrough came in Night Watch, where he starred as Yegor.

== Filmography ==
=== Films ===
- Night Watch (2004) as Yegor (credited as Dmitri Martynov)
- Day Watch (2006) as Yegor (credited as Dima Martynov)

=== Television ===
- The Talisman of Love (2005)
