= Death or Glory =

Death or Glory may refer to:

== Music ==
- "Death or Glory", an 1895 military march (also known as "Tenth Regiment March") written by Robert Browne Hall
- "Death or Glory" (song), a 1979 song by the Clash from the album London Calling
- Death or Glory, a 1981 song by Holocaust from the album The Nightcomers
- "Death or Glory", a 1984 song by Rose Tattoo from the album Southern Stars
- Death or Glory (album), a 1989 heavy metal album by Running Wild
- Death or Glory? (album), a 1992 album by Roy Harper
  - Death or Glory?, a 1992 EP by Roy Harper
- "Death or Glory", a 1993 song by Motörhead from the album Bastards
- Death or Glory, a 2007 heavy metal EP by Divinity Destroyed
- "Death or Glory", a 2015 song by Iron Maiden from the album The Book of Souls

== Other uses ==
- Death or Glory (video game), a 1987 video game by Wise Owl Software and CRL Group
- Death or Glory, the motto of the Queen's Royal Lancers of the British Army, formed in 1993
  - Death or Glory, the motto of the Royal Lancers, the 2015 successor regiment to the Queen's Royal Lancers
- Death or Glory (novel), a 1998 Russian novel by Vladimir Vasilyev, published in English in 2004
