= Spy (2012 Russian film) =

The Spy
- Theatrical release poster
- Directed by: Alexey Andrianov
- Written by: Nikolay Kulikov; Boris Akunin; Vladimir Valutskiy
- Based on: The Spy Novel (ru) by Boris Akunin
- Produced by: Leonid Vereshchagin; Sergey Shumakov; Maria Ushakova; Aleksandr Utkin
- Starring: Danila Kozlovsky; Fyodor Bondarchuk; Anna Chipovskaya; Viktoriya Tolstoganova; Sergey Gazarov; Vladimir Epifantsev; Andrey Merzlikin; Viktor Verzhbitsky; Ekaterina Melnik; Dmitry Nazarov
- Cinematography: Denis Alarcon-Ramirez
- Edited by: Yaroslav Mochalov; Luca Paracels (TV version)
- Music by: Yuri Poteyenko
- Production companies: Studio TriTe; Russia-1
- Distributed by: Central Partnership
- Release date: April 5, 2012 (Russia)
- Running time: 99 minutes 164 minutes (TV version)
- Country: Russia
- Language: Russian
- Budget: RUB 192 million $60 million
- Box office: RUB 274.2 million $4.903.665

The Spy (Russian: Шпион, romanized: Shpion) is a 2012 Russian spy film, an adaptation of Boris Akunin's novel The Spy Novel (Шпионский роман). It was directed by Alexey Andrianov, the film stars Danila Kozlovsky and Fyodor Bondarchuk. Akunin adapted his own novel. It had one of the largest film budgets in Russian history.

== Plot ==
It is 1941, months before the German invasion of Soviet Russia. The two protagonists, NKVD officers Dorin and Oktyabrsky, are hunting a German Abwehr spy in Moscow. They believe their success might reveal Adolf Hitler's plans and the exact date of invasion.

It is implied that Dorin is a distant relative of Erast Fandorin, the most popular character of Akunin's books.

== Cast ==
- Danila Kozlovsky as Yegor Dorin, State Security Officer
- Fyodor Bondarchuk as Alexey Oktyabrsky, Senior Major of State Security, Dorin's boss
- Anna Chipovskaya as Nadezhda 'Nadya'
- Viktoriya Tolstoganova as Iraida Petrakovich
- Sergey Gazarov as Lavrenty Beria
- Vladimir Epifantsev as senior security lieutenant Kogan
- Andrey Merzlikin as radio operator Karpenko
- Viktor Verzhbitsky as Lezhava, NKVD officer
- Ekaterina Melnik as Lyubov Serova
- Dmitry Nazarov as Nadya's dad
- Mikhail Filippov as Joseph Stalin
- Oleksiy Gorbunov as Selentsov, Vasser's Connector
- Boris Kamorzin as Lyalin, chauffeur of the NKVD
- Alexander Kuznetsov as NKVD officer
- Eckie Hoffman as Adolf Hitler
- Edgar Bölke as Admiral Wilhelm Canaris
- Felix Schultess as driver of Admiral Wilhelm Canaris
- Maksim Maltsev as Golovasty

== Crew ==
- Director - Alexey Andrianov
- Producer - Leonid Vereshchagin, Sergey Shumakov
- Screenplay by Vladimir Valutskiy
- Production designer - Viktor Petrov
- Cinematographer - Denis Alarcon-Ramirez
- Stunt Coordinator - Valeriy Derkach
- Editor (TV version) - Luca Paracels

== Production ==
The film was based on the plot of Boris Akunin's The Spy Novel written in 2005. In the tango scene, during a pause, the hero of Fyodor Bondarchuk clicks his orchestra loudly with his fingers. Although the hand is in a glove, and it is impossible to make such a sound in it.

=== Filming ===
Principal photography, some scenes had to be shot not in the Russian capital, but in the city of Minsk, Belarus.

== Versions ==
The duration of the full television version is more than 4 series of 45 minutes.

== Release ==
The film was released in the Russian Federation on April 5, 2012, by Central Partnership. The closed premiere took place on April 2.

== Reception ==
The movie was a moderate success at the box office grossing $4.588.176 (258.479.483 rubles) against a budget of 192.000.000 rubles.

=== Critical response ===
From an article about the film The Spy in the journal Izvestia:

The Russian film The Spy, sold in the USA for display on the VOD system (video on demand), in just a few days at the HULU video service, came out in number of views to 14th place among 2.5 thousand European, American and Asian films. This is an extraordinary result, commented on the information of Eleanor Pomegranate, representing Loskino in Los Angeles.

From the review of the film The Spy in the newspaper Gazeta.Ru:

The Spy is the first successful adaptation of Boris Akunin's prose, placed in the only comic book space suitable for her.

From the review of the film The Spy in the newspaper Trud:

Alexei Andrianov's fantasy turned out to be ironic, rich, full of chic and funny episodes. Where, for example, there is a wonderful Oktyabrsky tango with a movie star Lyubov Serova (Ekaterina Melnik) who was beaten off by him in a restaurant for unsympathetic youths - and in this scene the exquisitely self-righteous hero Bondarchuk evokes about the same feelings as the imperial Moscow invented by Andrianov.
