= Viktor Verzhbitsky =

Soviet-Russian actor (born 1959)

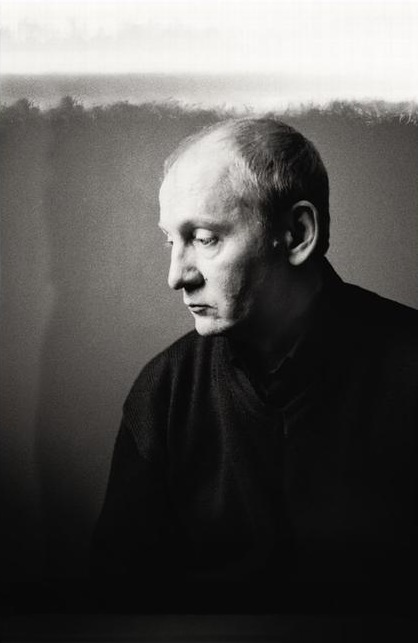
- Born: Viktor Alexandrovich Verzhbitsky; 21 June 1959 (age 67); Tashkent, Uzbek SSR, Soviet Union
- Education: DSMI (Uzbek State Institute for Arts)
- Occupation: Actor
- Years active: 1983–present
- Children: Alexander Verzhbisky

Viktor Alexandrovich Verzhbitsky (Russian: Виктор Александрович Вержбицкий; born 21 September 1959) is an Uzbek-Russian film and stage actor. He is well known for playing mobsters, businessmen, and villains and he is well known for playing the role of Zavulon in the 2004 film Night Watch and its 2006 sequel Day Watch.

He has been relatively active as an actor on both the small screen and large screen since 1994 when he starred in Timur Bekmambetov's Peshavar Waltz. He has become one of Russia's best known actors.

== Biography ==
=== Early life and education ===
Viktor Alexandrovich Verzhbitsky was born on 21 September 1959 in Tashkent, Uzbek SSR.

His aristocratic surname is due to his great-grandfather – a Kraków Pole. Viktor spent his childhood behind the scenes - his grandmother worked in the theater as a dresser.

In 1983 he graduated from the Tashkent Theater and Art Institute named after A.N. Ostrovsky.

=== Theatre ===
In 1983–1995 he played at the Tashkent Academic Drama Theater named after Gorky. In the theater, he played the role of Avrosimov in the Throat of Freedom by Bulat Okudzhava, Treplev in The Seagull by Anton Chekhov, Scipio in Caligula by Albert Camus, Obolyaninov in Zoykin's Apartment by Mikhail Bulgakov, Kolodzhero di Speleta in The Great Magic by Eduardo de Filippo and others.

In the Tashkent theater Ilkhom, Verzhbitsky played in the performances Dear Elena Sergeevna Lyudmila Razumovskaya (Volodya), The Scenes by the Fountain Semen Zlotnikov (Koshkin), The house that Swift built Grigory Gorin (Someone).

The actor was also busy in the performance of the Tashkent Youth Theater "Ekvus" by Peter Sheffer (Dr. Daisert).

In 1995–1998, Verzhbitsky worked in the Moscow New Drama Theater. The list of the roles he played was supplemented by Guatinar in the "Revenge of the Queen" by Eugene Scribe and Ernest Leguwe, Dorant in the "Jourdain" by Jean-Baptiste Molière, Menshikov in the "Assembly" of Peter Gnedich.

In 1998–2005 he played at the Et Cetera Theater. They were filled with the role of the Lecturer in the "Guide for those wishing to marry" by Anton Chekhov, Okha in The Death of Tarelkin by Alexander Sukhovo-Kobylin, Lanchelot Gobbo and Antonio in William Shakespeare's "Shaylock", Henry Higgins in "My Fair Lady" Bernard Shaw, Beattie in "451 Fahrenheit" Ray Bradbury and others.

Since 2007, Verzhbitsky is an actor of the A.S. Pushkin. In the theater he played the part of Freddie in the play "Locusts" and Ivan Telyatyev in "Raging Money" by Alexander Ostrovsky, Emperor Altome in the production of "Turandot" by Carlo Gozzi. In the current repertoire he plays Otto Marvulia in the "Great Magic" by Eduardo de Filippo.

The actor also plays Smerdyakov and Zosima in the play "Karamazov" in the Moscow Art Theater, Pantagruel in the play "Gargantua and Pantagruel" at the Theater of Nations.

=== Film and television ===
In cinema, Verzhbitsky was discovered by film director Timur Bekmambetov, who studied with the actor at the stage design department at the Tashkent Theater and Art Institute. The director directed the actor in the title role in the film Peshavar Waltz (1994) and in a number of commercials. In the advertisement of the bank "Imperial" Verzhbitsky first played the emperor Nicholas I, whose character he later embodied in the series Poor Nastya and One Night of Love. In the advertisement of the bank "Slavyansky" he played the role of Osip Mandelstam.

Cooperation with Timur Bekmambetov continued in the films The Arena (2001), Night Watch (2004), Day Watch (2005), Black Lightning (2009) and the Yolki series of films.

In total, Verzhbitsky played over 80 roles in various films and television series.

Among his works of recent years are roles in the films Spy (2012), Treasures of OK (2013), Zaletchiki (2014), the series Intelligence (2012), Caesar (2013) and The Inquisitor (2014).

The actor took part in several projects on television. From May to August 2011, along with Roma Zver, he led the "Game" program on the NTV channel, acting as a moderator of the game. From May 2012 to February 2013, he was the host of a series of 80 documentaries "Mystical Stories with Victor Verzhbitsky" on TV-3. In 2012, participated in the shooting of nine games "Fort Boyard", where he played the role of the magician Fur. The premiere took place in February–April 2013 at Channel One.

=== Honors ===
Victor Verzhbitsky received the title People's Artist of Russia in 2011. He was awarded the MTV-Russia award (2006), the Golden Eagle award (2008), and also the prizes of the newspaper Moskovskij Komsomolets (2009, 2012).

In 2010, Verzhbitsky was awarded the title of academician of the International Academy of Stunt Work.

== Selected filmography ==
- Peshavar Waltz (1994) – Viktor Dubois
- Mama Don't Cry (1997) – Igor
- The Barber of Siberia (1998) – adjutant of the Great Count
- The Arena (2001) – Timarkus
- Poor Nastya (2003-2004) – emperor Nicholas I of Russia
- Countdown (2004) – Lev Pokrovsky
- Night Watch (2004) – Zavulon
- Stealing Tarantino (2005) – Salvador
- The Fall of the Empire (2005, TV) – Ganskiy
- Day Watch (2005) – Zavulon
- The Turkish Gambit (2005) – Lukan
- The Case of "Dead Souls" (2005, TV) — Dubbel
- 12 (2007) – 11th jury member
- The Irony of Fate 2 (2007) – man at the station
- Paragraph 78 (2007) – member of the war tribunal
- The Admiral (2008) Alexander Kerensky
- One Night of Love (2008) – emperor Nicholas I of Russia
- Black Lightning (2009) – Viktor Kuptsov
- Hooked on the Game (2009) — Boris Gromov
- Yolki (2010) – Igor Vorobyov
- Yolki 2 (2011) – Igor Vorobyov
- Iron Lord (2010) – Svyatozar
- Our Russia. The Balls of Fate (2010) – Victor Marjanovich Ryabushkin
- Spy (2011) – Lezhava
- Branded (2012) – Yuri Nikolaevich
- Yolki 1914 (2014) — Count Vostrikov
- Mafia: The Game of Survival (2015) – creator of the game
- Coach (2018) – mayor
- Gold Diggers (2019, TV) - Innokentiy Mescherskiy
