= New Watch =

Book by Sergey Lukyanenko

- First edition (Russian)
- Author: Sergei Lukyanenko
- Original title: Новый Дозор
- Language: Russian
- Series: World of Watches
- Genre: Horror/fantasy
- Publication date: 2012 (original Russian edition)
- Publication place: Russia
- English publication date: 2013
- Preceded by: Last Watch
- Followed by: Sixth Watch

New Watch (Russian: «Новый Дозор») is a fantasy novel by the Russian writer Sergei Lukyanenko.

The novel is the fifth in a series that includes Night Watch, Day Watch, Twilight Watch, Last Watch and Sixth Watch. The series revolves around two opposing supernatural groups (known as "Others"): the Night Watch, an organization dedicated to policing the actions of the Dark Others — and the Day Watch, which polices the actions of the Light Others.

New Watch was published in summer 2012 in Russia. New Watch was published in English on May 2, 2013 (ISBN 0434022314 Publisher: William Heinemann, 2013), in the UK. Scheduled release for the US is April 2014.

== Structure and style ==
New Watch has the typical structure of the Watch novels, excluding Day Watch. New Watch is divided into three stories - "Vague objectives", "Troublous times" and "Vague deeds". Each story begins with a prologue followed by eight numbered chapters and, changing the usual structure, without an epilogue. Except for the prologues, the events of each story are written in a first person narrative using the voice of the Higher Magician character Anton Gorodetsky, a member of the Night Watch. Events in each of the prologues are written in a third person narrative. The entire novel is written in the past tense.

== Plot summary ==
=== Vague objectives ===
Anton Gorodetsky, while seeing a foreign colleague off at the airport, encounters an overweight 10-year-old boy named Kesha, who tries to prevent his mother from boarding a plane, claiming that the plane will crash. Anton scans the boy and determines that Kesha is an uninitiated high-level Other, possibly a prophet. Anton influences Kesha's mother not to board the plane.

Meanwhile, Sergeant Pastukhov of the Moscow police, who gained an ability to see Others (he calls Light Others "dogs" and Dark Others "wolves") in the first novel, sees an extremely powerful entity whom he labels a Tiger. The Tiger can remove a human's aura, which leaves the person completely indifferent to anything. The Night Watch sends Semyon to initiate the boy, although Geser is very disturbed by the events at the airport, as the plane does not crash as prophesied (unlike predictions, prophecies cannot be changed). Geser calls a meeting of all Light Great Others (including Anton's wife Svetlana and daughter Nadya). They then travel by car (through Twilight) to Kesha's apartment in order to protect him from this strange new creature.

The Tiger intercepts them and proves to be more than a match for four Great Mages. It only leaves when Zabulon joins the battle. Anton realizes that the Tiger is a creature of the Twilight whose purpose is to hunt prophets before they utter their first complete prophecy. If this prophecy is heard by a human, then it becomes inevitable. If an Other hears it, then he or she becomes the Tiger's next target. While the Night Watch is attempting to hold off the Tiger, Kesha utters the prophecy in an empty room (a prophet does not hear his or her own key prophecy), causing the Tiger to leave. However, Anton has previously asked Kesha to press the record button on a toy phone. Anton then copies the phone's recording onto a flash drive.

=== Troublous times ===
Geser summons Anton and sends him on a business trip to London to meet Erasmus Darwin, a Dark Other who is a prophet and the grandfather of Charles Darwin. Erasmus was able to trick the Tiger. Erasmus meets Anton and explains how, while his teacher (Zabulon himself) was desperately fighting the Tiger, the young Erasmus shouted the prophecy into an oak. Erasmus then gives Anton a goblet he made from that oak and claims that his prophecy can be revealed, although he refuses to tell Anton how.

At a local pub, Anton meets the former witch Arina, who tells Anton that, a hundred years ago, she prevented a prophecy that would destroy Russia from happening (although it resulted in the Russian Revolution). She convinces Anton to go with her to Taiwan to meet Fang Wan-Yang, whose friend was a prophet. Fang reveals that the Tiger can leave the Others alone if they can prove beyond doubt that they will never reveal the prophecy (Fang had to kill his friend and honors his memory by keeping the secret). Arina, who has figured out that Anton has a recording of Kesha's prophecy, steals the flash drive and flees using an untraceable artifact.

=== Vague deeds ===
Arina once again appears to Anton and explains that the boy's prophecy concerns his daughter and urges Anton to listen to it. Anton gets a call from Erasmus, who reveals that he has made a second goblet and listened to it. Anton hears as the Tiger kills Erasmus. Anton, who has backed up the recording of Kesha's prophecy on his old mini-disc player, listens to it and hears that Nadya, an Absolute Other, is capable of destroying the Tiger and, with it, the Twilight itself.

Anton decides to destroy Erasmus's oak goblet. At that moment, Nadya, Kesha, and Arina enter the apartment. Instead of destroying the goblet, fire reveals Erasmus's prophecy to the four. The prophecy claims that Nadya will destroy the Tiger and the Twilight. Seeing the Tiger, who is determined to kill them all to prevent the prophecy from coming true, Anton uses Arina's teleportation artifact to flee to her cabin. Arina, who has decided that magic is evil and must be destroyed, tries to provoke Nadya to kill the Tiger.

Anton walks outside and talks to the Tiger. The Tiger explains that a prophecy is merely the manifestation of the will of humanity, but not all of them must happen. If the Tiger dies, then the Others will lose their magic. Anton returns and makes Kesha and Nadya promise never to reveal the prophecy. He then traps himself and Arina in a Sarcophagus of Time for all eternity. However, the Tiger pulls Anton out, fearing that Nadya might kill it to try to get her father back. Arina remains in the Sarcophagus with the depleted teleportation artifact (which Anton believes can be recharged in 5 years). Satisfied, the Tiger leaves.

== Characters ==
=== Light Others ===
- Anton Gorodetsky - Protagonist of the book, Grand Light Mage. Married to Svetlana Gorodetskaya (née Nazarova), with whom he has a daughter, Nadezhda, the only currently living absolute (zero-leveled) Other in the world. A programmer for the Moscow Night Watch in his beginning days as an Other, Anton's rise in rank among the Others was significantly noticeable, to the point where he rose as a Grand Other thanks to the ritual of Fuaran, performed by his former friend and High Vampire Kostya Saushkin. Due to his observance of young Innokentiy Tolkov, a potential High-level Prophet, at the Sheremetyevo International Airport, he's sent to London by Gesar to investigate the origin and powers of the Tiger with Erasmus Darwin, a retired Dark Other Prophet who, rumour has it, has survived an encounter with the Tiger. Anton sees the Tiger as a nice, simple man.
- Boris Ignatyevich/Gesar - Grand Light Mage. Head of the Moscow Night Watch who, if one trusts the words of the Dark Witch/Light Healer Arina, "sets his roots" wherever there are interesting events regarding the Night and Day Watches (according to his own words, he's lived in Tibet, China, India, Belgium, the Netherlands, and, to present-day, Russia). He's in a relationship with Olga, a grand light Sorceress who's been together with him for many centuries. Known as an intrigant and cunning person, he set in motion a series of events, along with consultations with Zavulon, head of the Moscow Day Watch, and the Inquisition (the consultation part was discovered during the novel New Watch) which resulted in the birth of absolute sorceress Nadezhda Gorodetskaya. He also has a son with Olga, Timur, with whom he had no contact until the events of the novel Twilight Watch, when he managed to turn him into a low-level Light Other with the ritual of Fuaran. Gesar sees the Tiger as a wise man well in his ages.
- Svetlana "Sveta" Gorodetskaya (née Nazarova) - Grand Light Healer and wife of Anton Gorodetsky, with whom she has a daughter, Nadezhda, the only currently living absolute Other in the world. Before she was initiated into the Night Watch, she was a doctor who Gorodetsky accidentally ran into during his field assignment with a vortex clinging above her head, which could only be cast by a very powerful Dark Mage (later on, in the other series of the books, it was discovered that the entire "accidental encounter" was planned by Gesar). Because of the large difference of power between her and Anton during the events of Night Watch, which threatened to crush their relationship, she withdrew from the Night Watch, although in several times she performed a role that only a Night Watch member would be allowed to perform (e.g. representing the Night Watch during the murder of Witezislav).
- Olga - Grand Light Sorceress and love interest of Gesar. Olga was assigned as a partner to the new field agent of the Moscow Night Watch, Anton Gorodetsky, while she was still in the body of what seemed to be a stuffed owl in Gesar's cabinet. Later it was discovered that she was assigned to help Anton because Gesar wanted to lower the punishment she received for, as she said, "making a compromise with the Dark Others during a conflict". Over the course of the books, it is seen that she shows great interest in Anton's psychological state, and carefully tracks his movements during certain major events, giving him advice on how to react in such situations. During the events of Twilight Watch, she manages to find her and Gesar's long lost son, Timur, and while under the mask of old Russian actor Oleg Strizhenov, she promises her son anything and swears it on the primordial force of the light. Timur cunningly asks to be turned into an Other himself, but not through the source of vampires/shifter-mages. Gesar then starts a number of events that allowed him to turn his and Olga's son into a Light Other. Olga sees the Tiger as an agile and cunning woman.
- Nadezhda "Nadya" Gorodetskaya - Absolute Light Sorceress and daughter of Grand Light Mage Anton Gorodetsky and Grand Light Healer Svetlana Gorodetskaya. Given her absolute state, she is the only currently living Other in the world who does not emit, but only absorb the magic from everything living around her. Aged ten during the events of New Watch, Nadezhda still keeps her childlike innocence, despite the incredible power she can use anytime she pleases. She meets the potential Zero-level Prophet Innokentiy "Kesha" Tolkov, during the Tiger's siege of the Night Watch headquarters, where she persuades him in speaking his first prophecy by, as she said, "punching him in the nose and threatening to tell everyone he got beat up by a girl unless he says that stupid prophecy". During the event Troublous Times, they became classmates as students of the Night Watch. When Anton, Nadya, Kesha and Arina hear Erasmus' prophecy, they find out that Nadya has the power to destroy the Tiger, thus to destroy the Twilight itself. Nadezhda sees the Tiger as a big, strong, flaming-eyed tiger.
- Innokentiy "Kesha" Tolkov - A high-level Prophet (first indications by Anton Gorodetsky presumed a Grand Prophet, while later it was discovered that the boy's potential could be the first, maybe second level), initiated by Semyon into the Night Watch. He was accidentally discovered by Grand Light Mage Anton Gorodetsky in the Sheremetyevo International Airport where he did not want to board the plane, screaming to his mother that it will crash. With his arrival at the Night Watch headquarters after initiation, the Tiger soon came for him, given the fact that he did not say his first prophecy yet. Nobody managed to persuade him into doing it, so Anton called his daughter Nadezhda to try, while Glyba, Zhermenzon and the others blocked the Tiger's path as long as they could. Later on in the book, he seems to have befriended Nadezhda, and it was discovered that the first part of his prophecy was almost as identical as the one Erasmus Darwin said centuries ago. Once approached by the Tiger and told by him that he, the Tiger, must kill him, Kesha, for his own good, Kesha refuses, to which the Tiger confirms the constatation and disappears.
- Alexander "Las" Ulyanov - A Seventh-level Light Mage with a strange sense of humour, and an even stranger look on the world of normal humans, despite him being a Light Other. Before meeting Anton during the events of Twilight Watch, Las was a human who owned an apartment in the Assol living complex. In his free time, he wrote songs and played them with his bass guitar while standing on the window of his apartment. During the encounter between Anton and Kostya Saushkin he witnessed, he was turned into a Light Other by Kostya, who used the book of Fuaran to perform the ritual. Since then, Las has been appointed in the Moscow Night Watch. During the events of New Watch, Las has an argument with Anton about the purpose of protecting people throughout the world from Dark Others when they find reasons to cause great unhappiness themselves, and says that Anton has risen himself above the normal people and that he could not live as a normal human for even a couple of hours, to which Anton blocks his abilities for one day to prove Las wrong.
- Semyon - A First-level Light Mage who is experienced in many things that other Others usually learn through magic usage. His age, knowledge, and experience give him a cynical look on the world. Despite this, he's still in the Moscow Night Watch, most commonly performing the job of the Watch's designated driver. During the events of New Watch, Semyon openly confronts Anton about his relationship with his wife, Svetlana, advising him to start changing their friendly feelings toward one another, so as the relationship does not break apart due to the lack of the love that the two had before Nadya was born. He was also assigned to initiate Kesha Tolkov into the Night Watch after Anton accidentally found him.
- Alisher Ganiev - A Fourth-level Light Mage from Uzbekistan whose father was a devona to Gesar. Because of Gesar's kindness of turning his (Alisher's) father from a mentally challenged person to an intelligent person, Alisher felt it was his duty to swear his own loyalty to Gesar as thanks for turning his father into a normal person, despite the spell was not permanent. He despises Dark Others, especially Dark Witch Alisa Donnikova, who killed his father. Alisher, hailing from Middle Asia, assisted Anton in locating the ancient Mage Rustam during the events of Final Watch. In New Watch, he was present in the Night Watch headquarters when the confrontation with the Tiger emerged, and helped the other Grand Others in slowing him down while Kesha spoke out his first prophecy.
- Valentine "Valya" Loktev - A Fourth-level Light Mage who drained the joy of humans during a concert in order to remoralize the entire Moscow government, from the president, all the way down to the janitor. He used the Sphere of Denial spell in order to prevent anyone in interfering with him while he's draining the power from the surrounding people. Anton, who joined his co-workers in this event, hit him on the head with a baton, disappointed that the young mage did not use a simple Mage's Shield, since the Sphere of Denial only blocks all magical attacks, and not physical ones.
- Anna Tikhonovna - A Light Other whose level has not been written in any of the books. She's employed as a teacher to the newcoming students of the Moscow Night Watch. During the events of all the books she has a minor role, although her role in New Watch is a bit more relevant than in the other books, since she was the only one who knew the exact address of Erasmus Darwin.
- Fan Wen Yang - A Fourth-level Light Other of Taiwanese origin. His friend, Lee, was a prophet who the Tiger was chasing in the past. To prove to the Tiger that the two would never tell the prophecy to anyone, people or Other, they arranged that Fan is offered as a tribute by Lee. But Lee tricked Fan into the exact opposite - Fan sacrificed Lee. Wen Yang is considered a homosexual when it comes to his relationship with his deceased friend. However, he says that they were bound together not only like that, but like brothers. He was visited by Anton and Arina, with whom he discussed the odd behavior the Tiger expressed during his siege of the Moscow Night Watch headquarters.
- Mark Emmanuilovich Zhermenzon - A Grand Light Battle Mage in retirement. Zhermenzon is of Jewish origin and shows incredible talent when it comes to constructing golems. According to the teachings of the Night Watch, it takes a long time to create a fully functional golem out of clay, metal, stone etc. However, during the encounter with the Tiger on the way to Kesha's home where Semyon was unable to contact anyone via Twilight, Zhermenzon managed to create a golem in a matter of seconds in order to succumb the Tiger. After an injury he obtained in an unknown way, he withdrew from service to the Night Watch. Zhermenzon sees the Tiger as a wise, old Jewish man.
- Sergey Glyba - A Grand Light Prophet who withdrew from service to the Night Watch to live the life of a human. He's popular among the Yellow Pages, from where Anton recognizes him. Glyba is known to predict events before they occur, however, before the siege of the Tiger on the Moscow Night Watch headquarters, he could not predict anything, which pointed out that they may be facing a Mirror, since a Mirror acts on intuition, and does not plan anything.
- Galina Stanislawowna - A 52- year old Light Other who was a teacher prior to her initiation into the Moscow Night Watch. She is the oldest student in the group that's presented in New Watch.
- Dennis - A Light Other, who is a student in the Moscow Night Watch. Prior to his initiation, he was a military member who was discharged during the reforming of the army. Anton assumes that he could grow to be a potentially powerful Battle Mage.
- Farhad - A Light Other, who is a student in the Moscow Night Watch. Prior to his initiation, he was (and still is) a manager of an oil company in Kazan, who was very successful and has achieved success in business, which surprised Anton, given the fact that the type of men like Farhad rarely become Light Others.
- Pavel - A Light Other, who is a student in the Moscow Night Watch. As Anton describes him, he's a man who grew up with computer games and books about Harry Potter.
- David Sakhyan - A seventeen- year old Light Other who was initiated into the Moscow Night Watch, and is now a student in the same.

=== Dark Others ===
- Zabulon/Zavulon - A Grand Dark Mage and head of the Moscow Day Watch. His age matches Gesar's. During the events of the New Watch, when Anton was experiencing the thoughts of Erasmus Darwin, it was discovered that Zavulon was Erasmus' teacher, and that he had educated him well, not only in magic usage of the Others, but a historical and philosophical one. It is also discovered, once the goblet that contained the prophecy was broken, that Zavulon did not give up on Erasmus when the Tiger gave chase, but tried to fight him, and, once that was proven to be futile, pleaded for mercy. The Tiger departed since Erasmus had yelled out the prophecy into an oak tree. Zavulon's Twilight form is known to be a hairy, demonic humanoid, larger than usual. He had known of the Tiger during the first encounter with him, but he did not share the information with Anton. It is possible that Gesar knew who they were dealing with but neither did he say anything about it. Zavulon sees the Tiger as a giant, gross demon.
- Erasmus Darwin - A high-level Dark Prophet, student of Zavulon who resides in London after retirement from the Day Watch. Due to his lack of contact with the human world, it appears that he has kept his archaic way of speaking. However, after a long conversation with Anton Gorodetsky, Gorodetsky realised that Erasmus was recently in contact with his teacher, and had consulted with him about the arrival of him, Anton. Eventually, he told Anton that he had made two goblets, and that he kept one for himself, but could not resist to not hear his own prophecy. Once he did, his fate was sealed and the Tiger came for him.

=== Others/Unaffiliated ===
- Arina - A former Grand Dark Witch and current Grand Light Healer. She's also the thirteenth and last leader of the Witch Conclave. In 1931, under the agreement of both the Moscow Night and Day Watches, and the cautious eye of the Inquisition, she conducted a mass experiment on humans which resulted in the creation of communism. Seeing the consequences of the newly formed society, she went into hibernation for 60 years. After her reawakening, she was shocked to see the advance of not only technology, but medicine as well. Between the events of Twilight Watch and Final Watch she changed her colour, turning from a Dark Witch into a Light Healer, and tried to obtain the Crown of all things, created by Merlin, which she, along with her allies, the Inquisitor Edgar and High Vampire Genaddy "Genna" Saushkin, thought could bring back all the fallen Others to life. During the events of New Watch, Arina had managed to obtain the copy of the prophecy young Kesha had said during her trip with Anton Gorodetsky to Taiwan. When she heard it, she pleaded her case to Anton again, hoping to correct her mistakes when she heard that no prophecy that was foretold could be defied, but only slowed down or delayed. Arina told Anton the prophecy is regarding his daughter, Nadya, prompting Anton to destroy the goblet which contained the prophecy. Ironically, this activated the prophecy hidden within the goblet. To prove to the Tiger that they will never tell anyone about the prophecy, Anton trapped himself and Arina into the Sarcophagus of Time, a 10-by-10 round room with no exits on any level of the Twilight. It is described as an "infinite time capsule floating through the Twilight". However, the Tiger rips a hole in the Sarcophagus, pulls Anton out and leaves Arina in a unique situation: No one could escape from the Sarcophagus, however, Arina had the unique Inquisition artefact, the Minoan Sphere, which could open portals anywhere. Due to the pull of 4 Others recently, Anton assumes that the sphere will need some time to recharge if it is not completely depleted.
- Tiger - The Tiger, as he explained to Anton himself, is a physical manifestation of the Twilight. He had many names throughout history, Tiger being the most recent, as he was named like that by officer Dmitriy Pastukhov, who can, although human, recognize Light and Dark Others (the first he calls "Guard dogs" and the Dark Others "Wolves"). He was thought by most of the Others to be a prophet hunter. Recent information has proven that the Tiger does not hunt prophets, but actually pokes and persuades them into prophesying. Zavulon is the only Other who encountered the Tiger twice (and lived to tell about it), as the Tiger had a confrontation with Zavulon while he was a teacher to young Erasmus Darwin. The Tiger is not a blood-hungry manifestation of the Twilight. If he sees that his prophets will not tell the prophecies to anyone, he does not kill them. Unnecessary victims are what he avoids. He also discovers to Anton, while they are talking outside Arina's cabin, that prophecies are the will of the people of the world, but not all of them have to be realised. In the end of the book, he confirms the doubts that Nadezhda Gorodetskaya can destroy him, and thus, the Twilight. After Kesha does not want to be slain by the Tiger, he agrees and leaves.
- Dmitriy "Dima" Pastukhov - A Human police officer who gained the ability to see and split Light and Dark Others as "guard dogs" and "wolves". This ability has manifested since his incident with Anton Gorodetsky during the events of Night Watch, where Anton had to get the officers out of his way fast, and the only thing he could think of is making them to go buy vodka and get drunk. Pastukhov saw Gorodetsky on the Sheremetyevo the same day he saw the Tiger for the first time. He was so scared when he saw him that he defecated in his pants, while his colleague quit his job as he thought life was pointless, and guarding was also pointless. Pastukhov gave Anton the name of "the Tiger" and also made another appearance when he was invited to the Night Watch as a special guest during Olga's lecture. He also joined Anton when they fought Valentine Loktev in the music concert, as he was uncomfortable to be left alone with a vampire, despite the vampire was "on-duty" and watched the conversation between Anton and Valya.
