= Death or Glory (novel) =

1998 novel by Vladimir Vasilyev

Death or Glory (Russian: Смерть или Слава, Smert ili Slava) is a science fiction novel by Vladimir Vasilyev, first published in Russian in 1998, then translated into English (however, not published) in 2004 by Capricorn Publishing. The first part of Death or Glory may be read online.

The novel is the first of four describing the future of humankind among the stars. Humans have acquired faster-than-light travel centuries ago (it's only recently at the galactic scale), but does not progress further. All energetic and ambitious people have moved to new colonies, leaving the Earth to stagnate.

The galaxy is ruled for long by an alliance of five powerful races, mired in an ancient war with extra-galactic Imperishable. Without this war, the Alliance would enslave the Humankind like it treats other newcomers, but now Svaighs just don't have the will and resources. Despite this, most people live in filth and poverty. But the situation changes, when people gain a bleak chance to succeed — and show the Galaxy they aren't going to refuse of it, these Homo with a motto Death or Glory.

== Plot ==
A human colony world of Volga is populated by ex-Russians, Americans, and Germans. While there is a government of sorts on the planet, most disputes are settled Wild West style. All males own a weapon since there are plenty of bandits. Life is chaotic and, at the same time, simple. Everything changes when prospector Roman Savelyev (his personal blaster has the words "Death or Glory" engraved) finds a strange black box with a big red button in one of his mines. After musing on how clichéd his situation is, he cannot help himself and presses the button. The box disappears the morning after. Several days later, a giant starship suddenly appears and enters Volga's atmosphere to come to rest above the island where the box was found. Not long after the races of the Alliance trace the heavy gravitational tracks of such a huge ship having penetrated the Barrier and showing up in orbit. The aliens assume that the ship belongs to a disappeared ancient race they call the Departed Ones. They are followed by an armada of Imperishables who are also interested in the strange vessel.

The Alliance dares to investigate the ship and use it as a weapon. However the results are disappointing: ship's only controls are "biosuits" — organic structures wrapping an organism to perform a full contact — and they are designed only for humans. Pressed for time as Imperishable are soon to arrive, the Alliance comes to a plan of capturing as many humans as possible and using them to defeat the attack. But although it's easy to destroy the planet, to capture human "savages" proves to be a difficult task: humans are able to hold off the invaders whose orders are to capture the homo not kill them.

Eventually though, most humans are captured and brought to the strange ship. Alliance scientists use their captives to reactivate the ship's systems, especially weapons to use against the Imperishables. However, the humans are able to take over the ship using the neural connections of the "biosuits" and obliterate the alien fleets. Volga is destroyed in the same battle, and the alien ship jumps into deep space.

On the ship, dubbed Volga by the humans for their destroyed colony, some parts of the crew (mostly the former colony administration) begin plotting against their captain (Savelyev) and his command crew for the control of the ship. As it turns out, the ship selects the command structure based on the person who pressed the red button who becomes captain. Those closest in mindset to Sevelyev are given high command positions. Most bureaucrats and thugs have very different personalities from the captain and are assigned to low positions (something they do not like). At the same time, Savelyev is attempting to figure out the ship's true nature, as he is the only one with unrestricted access to Volga's systems. Once the attempted coup is put down, Savelyev reveals to his friends that the ship is a parasite, adapting its controls to whoever calls to it. Each time a person uses a biosuit, they experience euphoria, but ship also takes something of the person. Eventually, the ship consumes the crew and begins to seek out a new race to command it. The origins of the ship are unknown. Savelyev speculates that it is either a product of some ancient race or of the galaxy itself to act as an antibody against invaders, in this case the Imperishables.

Eventually, the Alliance catches up with the ship and propose a deal: humans help them drive the Imperishables out of the galaxy, and the Alliance "uplifts" all humans (whom they now call a latent race) to the status of full members of the Alliance. Savelyev, as the human representative, agrees to it, ensuring a place for humans among the stars.

The three other novels which take place in the same universe are called Black Relay, Legacy of Giants, and No One but Us (the latter two are usually published together as War for Mobility).

== Races ==
- Humans (AKA Homo) - humans only recently developed interstellar travel. First contact with an alien race (Svaigh) happened around the same time and was anything but peaceful: the Svaigh attacked the city of New London and demanded beryllium for their trouble. For the most part, the aliens leave the "underevolved apes" alone. As far as the Alliance is concerned, humans are a curiosity, nothing more (as the only mammalian race to develop intelligence).
- Alliance:
  - Aczanny - small avians. Capable of atmospheric flight. The Aczanny pyramids are ruled by one called Soaring-over-Pyramids.
  - Zoopht - large avians (about the size and shape of an ostrich). Their wings have evolved into arms. Capable mechanics and engineers. Ruled by the Three, each of which has domain over different areas of government and military.
  - Roy (AKA Swarm) - hive-like insectoids. Individuals (closest analogy) are assigned to tasks as need arises. The most advanced of the Alliance races. Their spherical ships enter and exit the FTL barrier without leaving any disturbances.
  - Ayeshi - inorganic crystals. Evolved into a technocratic society.
  - Svaigh - reptilian race. Supposedly originated at the center of the galaxy. Ruled by the Svaigh Gallery (a council of sat-clans).
- Slaves/Wards of the Alliance:
  - Shat-Tsur (AKA "Singing Skeletons") - humanoid in general shape but with holes in their bodies. Their sing-song voices and the holes have earned them their nickname. Physically, Shat-Tsur are tough, often used as ground troops by their masters, the Aczanny. Over the centuries, they have developed a powerful hatred for Aczanni and count the days when they can throw off their shackles, conquer the Alliance, and establish a new Shat-Tsur Empire.
  - Boolinga -
  - Oaons - shapeshifters. Capable of mimicking most races save, perhaps, the Ayeshi. Often used as spies by the Alliance. Excellent marksmen due to their ability to morph their eyes to give them perfect vision. Should the Shat-Tsur rebel, the Oaons are the most likely to join them.
- Imperishables - energy-based life-forms from another galaxy, capable of autonomous space travel, including FTL. They are engaged in an all-out war against the Alliance and appear to be slowly winning.
- Departed Ones (AKA Giants) - an ancient race that used to inhabit much of the galaxy millennia ago. It is suggested that they departed the galaxy for another one, leaving many artifacts behind. Both the Alliance and the Imperishables are seeking the artifacts for any advantage in the war.

== Sequel novels ==
- Black Relay - a novel written in a completely different style from Death or Glory. A freighter crew takes on the job of moving a strange container from one system to another. However, things turn for the worse when the crew starts to disappear one-by-one.
- Legacy of Giants - the first part of a duology, which takes place centuries after Death or Glory, describing an interstellar war between the five races of the Alliance (Roy disappeared shortly after the events of Black Relay, and humans became full members) and their former slaves, which gets a jump start when a human scoutship encounters a passageway into another galaxy. Convinced that other portals allowing instantaneous travel are hidden in the other galaxy, the Shat-Tsur throw off their shackles and attack the Alliance. The first target of their armada - the scoutship that made the discovery but failed to report the location of the portal. While escaping, the scoutship crew crash-lands on a remote human outpost planet, where a guide is taking a group of tourists through the jungle. As more and more ships from both sides of the war arrive above the planet, the tourists and the scoutship crew must fend off attacks from the entire Shat-Tsur army.
- No One But Us - the sequel to Legacy of Giants, which features many returning characters, many of whom have joined the military. The interstellar war between the Shat-Tsur Empire and the Alliance has come to a standstill, with neither side having the clear advantage. A group of space marines are dispatched to take part in a secret mission - travel to another galaxy through an ancient portal in order to locate more of such devices for military use. The side that possesses these portals can use them to move entire fleets between worlds instantaneously, gaining immense advantage in the conflict. Meanwhile, the Shat-Tsur Emperor (Shatta Unve) sends three massive fleets to three core human worlds in an attempts to put an end to the war. It is a race against time as the human leaders try to muster enough forces to stop the enemy, and the extra-galactic expedition must hurry to find the portals before the Shat-Tsur Empire prevails. Things get even more complicated, as it becomes clear that a hidden power is interfering in the war.
