= Day Watch (novel) =

2000 novel by Sergey Lukyanenko and Vladimir Vasilyev

- First edition (Russian)
- Authors: Sergei Lukyanenko, Vladimir Vasilyev
- Original title: Дневной Дозор
- Language: Russian
- Series: World of Watches
- Genre: Horror/Fantasy
- Published: 2000 (ACT) (Russia); 2007 (William Heinemann) (UK); 2007 (Miramax) (US)
- Publication place: Russia
- Pages: 453
- Preceded by: Night Watch
- Followed by: Twilight Watch

Day Watch (Russian: «Дневной Дозор») is a fantasy novel by Russian authors Sergey Lukyanenko and Vladimir Vasilyev. The second book in the saga of Watches, it is preceded by Night Watch and followed by Twilight Watch, Last Watch, New Watch, and Sixth Watch. Day Watch stands out as the only novel in the series not narrated mainly from Anton Gorodetsky's point of view.

While the 2006 film Day Watch bears the same name, it is actually a loose adaptation of the second half of the first book in the series, Night Watch, and not an adaptation of this novel.

The English translation by Andrew Bromfield was released in January 2007 both in the US and the UK.

== Plot summary ==
Walking the streets of Moscow, indistinguishable from the rest of its population, are The Others. These beings possess supernatural powers and can enter the Twilight, a shadowy world that exists in parallel to our own. Each Other owes allegiance to either the Dark or the Light forces. Each side has a patrol to ensure the opposing side follows the rules of an agreement put in place millennia ago. The Light's patrol is called Night Watch and the Dark's patrol is called Day Watch, in accordance with the times when each is active.

=== Unauthorised Personnel Permitted ===
(this story is told from the point of view of Alisa Donnikova)

In the prologue, a woman named Natasha visits a witch and requests that she cast a spell to make the woman's estranged husband fall in love with her again. After Natasha strikes a deal with the witch, members of the Night Watch suddenly arrive and arrest the witch, to Natasha's great surprise and confusion.

The story shifts to Alisa Donnikova, a young yet powerful Dark Other, who leaves her house to attend a meeting with her comrades on the Day Watch. The team is on a mission to apprehend and recruit an uninitiated Other, the practicing Dark witch from the prologue who has so far eluded the bureaus responsible for finding and initiating unlicensed practitioners of magic. It seems a routine operation, but when they arrive, the Night Watch team has already made the arrest. A fierce battle ensues, during which Alisa almost dies. Drained of her powers, she is sent to recuperate at a youth camp near the Black Sea. There she meets Igor. The chemistry between them is instant and irresistible, and Alisa finds herself falling in love. But then comes a shattering revelation: Igor is a Light Magician. Alisa suddenly realizes that he was one of those involved in the battle that left her crippled. Had they known what they were, they would have not entered their relationship. But now that they know, Igor (who reacts with rage, feeling he was tricked) challenges Alisa (who reacts with a more depressed note of sadness) to a duel. Alisa allows Igor to choose the site of the battle: off-shore, in the sea. Alisa chooses not to fight back, allowing Igor to magically push her under the water and drown her. She calls Zabulon for help but is shocked to find out Zabulon has planned her death all along. While this is going on, Makar, a boy that had become infatuated with Alisa, swims out to rescue her and also drowns.

Note: The first scene of this story forms the basis for the opening of the film Night Watch. In the movie, it is Anton (not Natasha) who goes to the witch. Rather than asking that his spouse fall back in love, he asks her to cast a spell that would kill his wife's love child with her adulterous lover (he later learns that the child was actually his own). Both scenes play out in much the same way from there, but the arrival of the Day Watch and subsequent battle do not take place in the movie.

=== A Stranger Among Others ===
(this story is told from the point of view of Vitaly Rogoza)

A man named Vitaly Rogoza awakens while walking through a park late at night with no memory of his past and no knowledge of his identity. Acting on an internal instinct whose source he cannot understand, he is able to protect himself from a werewolf and board a train to Moscow. Once in Moscow and still acting on instinct, he registers his presence as a Dark Other with the Day Watch and proceeds to stumble into a series of seemingly accidental encounters with the Night Watch, often resulting in a Night Watch member dying. He kills Tiger Cub in self-defense as she seeks revenge for him setting a trap that (legally) kills a Night Watch investigator trespassing in his hotel room.

While this is taking place, a Day Watch splinter group named the "Regin Brothers" stages an attack on the Inquisition to steal a powerful artifact named "Fafnir's Talon". Only four Regin Brothers survive and they head to Moscow. Members of the Night Watch and the Day Watch both learn that the Regin Brothers will be landing in a plane at Moscow International Airport.

At the airport, both groups set up camp; the Night Watch tries to thwart the plane's landing while the Day Watch seeks to ensure it proceeds smoothly. Vitaly wanders away from the main group of Day Watch agents and inadvertently stumbles upon the Regin Brothers and two powerful Night Watch members, Gesar and Svetlana. Gesar kills one of the Regin Brothers who attempts to flee, but Vitaly accidentally winds up in possession of the talon. He steals power from Svetlana and creates a portal that allows him to escape to a forest outside Moscow. After meeting some youths camping in the forest, Vitaly returns to Moscow. Instead of returning to the Day Watch offices with the talon, however, his instincts lead him to Maxim from the first novel, who is now a member of the Inquisition. At Maxim's behest, Vitaly relinquishes the talon. Soon thereafter, the Inquisition calls a meeting to determine what is happening and who should be held responsible. Anton is called to attend, but Zabulon encourages him to commit a small act of "betrayal" by not going, with the promise that he will be able to live freely with Svetlana and avoid bloodshed.

After Vitaly and Anton have a car accident (deliberately staged by Anton) on the way to the meeting, Svetlana concludes that Anton and Vitaly are engaged in a duel that will result in Anton's death. When Vitaly arrives before Anton at the meeting alone, she assumes the worst and strikes him with all of her considerable power, leaving her dangerously drained (like Alisa above). Vitaly absorbs Svetlana's power, although his clothes and MiniDisc player are destroyed. Anton then appears and gives Vitaly his own MiniDisc player as a replacement. The Inquisition concludes that Vitaly is a mirror and not an Other in the ordinary sense; thus he does not come under the terms of the Treaty and is free to pursue his own destiny. Vitaly was able to neutralize Svetlana by his presence and restore the balance between the Night Watch and Day Watch. Svetlana is sufficiently reduced in power, so that she and Anton are now theoretically able to live as equals, as Zabulon promised. Vitaly leaves the courthouse, listening to music, and dissipates into the Twilight, his purpose fulfilled.

=== Another Power ===
(this story is told in third-person, though the action continually switches its focus between the first novel's narrator, Anton, and a second-level Dark Other, Edgar)

The third story revolves around a trial by the Inquisition to investigate the events of the first two stories. The first part of the story deals with various involved parties travelling to Prague (where the trial will be held), the second part involves the characters meeting in a number of different configurations and talking, the third part involves the trial itself.

All of the surviving major characters of the first two stories are on their way to Prague, which is the new location of the Inquisition after the Regin Brothers destroyed the old one. Edgar, a fairly high level operative, is going to plead the Day Watch's case. Edgar assures the 3 remaining Regin Brothers that the Day Watch will protect them. Anton is going as a prosecutor for the Night Watch. Igor is already there being put up (but not held in custody) by the Inquisition.

In Prague, Anton meets an American Air Force pilot who is also a Light Mage. The pilot is proud of his work (bombing Kosovo). Anton is appalled that anyone can perform such evil acts and still align themselves with the Light. Anton and Edgar meet over beer and discuss Dark versus Light philosophy. Edgar shows that he is not an especially enthusiastic Dark Other, but he is dedicated to doing his job. Anton then goes to visit Igor while Edgar, left to his own devices, uncovers a lot of evidence to indicate that Zabulon is setting him up to be killed in order to facilitate the resurrection of Fafnir. He is frightened and angered by this prospect.

Meanwhile, Anton, eager to distract the suicidal Igor, gets him roaring drunk on Vodka and attempts to draw him into a strategy session to try to figure out what the Day Watch is up to, with some success. They wonder whose destiny it was that Olga changed at the end of Night Watch and here it is revealed that, though Svetlana's child—foretold by Gesar to be a girl—would have always been a powerful Light Other, the changes mean that her birth has been timed to make her daughter a Light Messiah. Gesar arrives and pleads with Igor to stick around for at least another 20 years. Igor is non-committal.

The next day, the trial begins. The Regin Brothers are tried first and are found guilty only of lesser crimes: though they transported Fafnir's Talon, they did not participate in its theft. They are stripped of all but the very least of their magical powers and then allowed to go. The focus of the trial then shifts to the events of the novel's first story. A number of minor charges against Gesar and Zabulon are dismissed via technicalities. Anton accuses Zabulon of indirectly arranging the duel between Igor and Alisa and blames Zabulon for the death of Makar, the young boy who drowned trying to save Alisa. Edgar and Zabulon challenge the Night Watch operatives to present proof, but neither Anton nor Igor can do so.

In order to get to the bottom of the case, the Inquisition temporarily resurrects Alisa, who implicates Zabulon in her demise, stating that Igor was not responsible for her death. Igor is cleared of all charges. However, when Alisa is sent back to the Twilight, Igor follows her, dying himself. Zabulon is ecstatic, admitting that he had indeed planned to sacrifice Alisa in order to remove Igor, saying that Igor was the only one that could have trained the upcoming Light Messiah. Since Zabulon's plan involved an even trade—Alisa for Igor—he has not violated the treaty, and the Inquisition clears him of charges. As Svetlana leaves, she tells Zabulon, "May no one ever love you." Gesar sends Anton to find her, while the rest of the individuals at the trial depart the scene. Edgar approaches a member of the Inquisition, Witezslav, who invites Edgar to "try on" an Inquisitor's robe. Edgar reluctantly takes the robe from Witezslav while mentioning that Svetlana's "curse" is pointless because Zabulon doesn't need anyone to love him anyway.

Note: This story is the only one in the hexalogy without a first-person narrator.

== Characters ==
=== Light Others ===
- Anton Gorodetsky (Light Mage) - a reluctant member of Night Watch, in the beginning of the first book, preferred mundane, technical jobs to actual field work. The events of the series forced him to step up and become a full-fledged operative. They also made him considerably more cynical about the cause of Light Others. His favorite pastime is listening to randomly arranged custom mini-discs. During the course of the novel, his and Svetlana relationship becomes rocky but the novel ends with the knowledge that Anton will be the father of Svetlana's child.
- Boris Ignatievich/Gesar (Grand Light Mage) - an ancient mage of Tibetan descent who taught a number of heroes and philosophers during his lifetime. He moved to Europe during the early 15th century. Although he has had many opportunities to advance to high-level posts within Night Watch, he chose to remain a regional director of the Moscow division. Gesar is a battle-hardened tactician who's been known to turn devastating defeats into small victories. He cares a great deal about his subordinates, though he doesn't hesitate to put them in harm's way for the sake of greater good.
- Svetlana (Grand Light Sorceress) - a young doctor who became a Great Light Enchantress. She is destined to be a mother of the Light Messiah. Her powers were severely drained by the Mirror.
- Olga (Grand Light Sorceress) - an old friend and an occasional lover of Gesar who was turned into an owl for breaking obligations she had to the light side. Prior to the events of Day Watch, that punishment was lifted and she was restored to full power. She also wrote in the book of destiny in order to affect the date of the Light Messiah's birth indirectly (since changing the destiny of an Other directly is very difficult).
- Semyon (Light Mage) - a crusty, experienced mage with a wryly cynical outlook on the world. Unlike many of his fellow mages, he is a capable fighter even without his magic.
- Tiger Cub/Katya (Shifter-Mage) - a young, playful mage with a penchant for jewels and amulets. She is highly regarded both by Dark and Light Others. It has been said that she could charm anyone. As the name implies, tiger is her animal form. She has a large house riddled with secret passages. While fighting with the mirror, Vitaly, she was crushed and killed by one of his spells.
- Bear (Shifter-Mage) - a reclusive, quiet mage known for his calculated, brutal tactics. It has been continuously speculated that he was originally a Dark Other, despite the well-known fact that once the choice is made, the Others can't change sides. His animal form is a large polar bear. He is frequently partnered with Tiger Cub and is greatly saddened with her demise.
- Ignat (Light Incubus/Succubus) - a self-absorbed mage with "[the] face of a Hollywood actor and [the] body of a Greek god". He prides himself on being able to bed any woman (or man, he doesn't care). As a result, he takes failure very hard.
- Garik (Light Mage) - a shy mage infamous for his bad luck with women.
- Alisher (Light Mage) - a weak magician born from a devona father and a human mother. Alisher's father was killed by Alisa Donnikova in the first book. Afterward he became Gesar's new apprentice. It was suggested that he might play an unknown role in Gesar's plan.
- Igor Teplov (Light Mage) - an idealistic mid-level mage. Despite his youthful appearance, he was born in the late 1920s. He is dedicated to the cause of Light Others, though his refusal to compromise his principles has occasionally caused problems. He was drained of his powers during a battle again the Dark Others and sent to a camp at the Black Sea to recuperate. He fell in love with Alisa while she too was recovering from a power drain, while both were unable to recognize each other as Others. Upon discovering Alisa was a Dark Other, he took it badly and challenged her, which led to her death as she didn't fight back. A year later, during the Fafnir incident, he willingly banished ("dematerialized") himself into the Twilight in order to be with Alisa, much to Gesar's chagrin.

=== Dark Others ===
- Zavulon (spelled Zabulon in the English translation) (Grand Dark Mage) - an ancient schemer about the same age as Gesar. His true form has taken on demonic characteristics because he had spent a great deal of time in the Twilight. He expressed interest in taking Alisa back, so long as she did what she was told (only to reveal that he was just using Alisa as part of his plan). He knew Lewis Carroll.
- Alisa Donnikova (Dark Witch) - a young witch with the penchant for mischief and discreet mind manipulation. She was killed as a result of Zavulon's scheme to deprive the Light Messiah of the proper teacher. She was temporarily resurrected to testify during the Farnir affair.
- Anna Lemesheva (Dark Witch) - a senior witch who used to be Zavulon's lover. She became jealous after Zavulon took a favour in Alisa. She was used as the vessel to rematerialize/resurrect Alisa temporarily.
- Edgar (Dark Mage) - a strong dark mage (1-2 level) who was transferred to Moscow from an Estonian Day Watch on Zavulon's behest. Although he was, for a while, a steadfast supporter of the Dark Other's cause, he found many aspects of the Dark Others' lifestyle distasteful. After getting tired of Zavulon's schemes, he joins the Inquisition.

=== Unaffiliated ===
- Maxim (Inquisitor) - a middle-class Light Other whose powers emerged before Night Watch could find him. Feeling compelled to seek out evil, he hunted and killed low-level Dark Others with an enchanted wooden dagger. Upon discovering the truth about the Others, he joined the Inquisition.
- Vitaly Ragoza (The Mirror) - a minor Other who was not associated with either side, but was turned into the Mirror by the Twilight itself in order to correct the imbalance between the Night Watch and Day Watch in Moscow. As the Mirror, he had an ability to match the power level of any Other he was combating at the time. In the span of two weeks, he killed Tiger Cub and drained Svetlana's power. Upon completing his mission, he vanished into the Twilight.
- Witezslav (Inquisitor): a Higher Vampire Dark Other. Anton was shocked to learn that there was a Vampire among the Prague Inquisition. In Czech - Vítězslav.
- Egor (Other) - a young and rare Other who was affiliated to neither Light nor Dark. It was suggested that he could become a Mirror like Vitaly.

== See also ==
- List of characters in the Night Watch Universe
- Night Watch
