= Night Watch (Lukyanenko novel) =

Novel by Sergei Lukjanenko

- First edition cover in Russian
- Author: Sergei Lukyanenko
- Original title: Ночной Дозор
- Translator: Andrew Bromfield
- Series: World of Watches
- Genre: Fantasy
- Publication date: 1998
- Publication place: Russia
- Followed by: Day Watch

Night Watch (Russian: «Ночной Дозор») is a fantasy novel by the Russian author Sergei Lukyanenko, the first to feature his fictional world of The Others. It was first published in Russia by AST in 1998. The novel is first in a cycle continued in Day Watch, Twilight Watch (also known as Dusk Watch), Last Watch (also known as Final Watch), New Watch, and Sixth Watch. "Destiny", the first story contained here, was made into the successful Russian film, Night Watch. While retaining many characters events, the adaptation alters some significant elements of the story. The second and third stories of the novel were adapted into the film's 2006 sequel, Day Watch.

== Premise ==
The work centers around a confrontation between two opposing supernatural groups (known as "Others"): the Night Watch, an organization dedicated to policing the actions of the Dark Others—and the Day Watch, which polices the actions of the Light Others.

== Background ==
There exists a magical realm beneath the surface of all things—referred to as the Twilight (or Gloom in other translations). The action in the novel centers on a group of people referred to as the Others —human beings who tapped into the Twilight and gained supernatural abilities. The Others were the humans (shamans, soothsayers, and wisemen) from long ago who figured out how to step into the Twilight. However, the Others are different from humans; they are born as Others. Humans are not able (at least in the first part of the cycle) to become Others. The Twilight does not offer its gifts freely; it feeds off the strength of those Others who enter it. If sufficiently weakened, they are consumed, never to return to the ordinary world. The aura of any Other, or emotional state at the time of their first entry into the Twilight, determines whether or not the Other will become a 'Light' or 'Dark' Other. Furthermore, once determined either Light or Dark, an Other must choose what specific powers they will borrow from the Twilight. Variations such as vampires, magicians, and healers are all possible, each with their own benefits and restrictions. Often, the choice is made by the state of mind but if choosing Light or Dark during Initiation, a Watch can attempt to steer the powers of someone into what they need at the time. "Initiation" refers to the process of an Other choosing not Light or Dark but choosing to officially be a part of the Night Watch (Light Others) or Day Watch (Dark Others). An Other can exist without being initiated as part of a Watch, still independently capable of entering the Twilight and becoming Light or Dark. The choice of becoming light or dark, even what specific powers you gain, is usually final.

The division of Light and Dark had always existed between the Others. Those of the Light believed it was their duty to help the weak and the helpless. Those of the Dark shunned all obligations. They did what they wanted, regardless of morals and consequences. For many millennia, the two sides fought a vicious battle. Both were willing to use any means necessary to achieve victory. Eventually they realized that if they continued their battle, neither side would survive. The leaders of both sides forged the Grand Treaty—a set of laws to govern the way the Others used their powers. The Light Others created the Night Watch, the Dark Others the Day Watch, to ensure that neither side would violate the Treaty. The Inquisition, a group composed of both Dark and Light Others, was created to arbitrate.

If they spend them too quickly, the Others can use the feelings and emotions of the humans surrounding them to recharge their powers. The Dark Others use negative emotions such as pain or anger, the Light Others use positive emotions such as joy. Feeding on pain causes pain to increase; feeding on joy causes joy to wane. Because negative emotions are much easier to achieve in humans, this arrangement creates a situation where the powers of the Dark Others are easier to recharge and are much more readily available than those of the Light Others.

Since the signing of the Treaty, the Night Watch and the Day Watch have kept their eyes on each other, diligently policing every violation. The old leaders continue to plot, using humanity and the Others as their pawns. Only time will tell which side will prevail.

== Structure and style ==
The novel is divided into three stories .Each story is subdivided into a prologue followed by eight chapters in the first story, and seven chapters in each of the following stories. Except for the prologues, the majority of the events in each story are written in a first person narrative using the voice of the Light Magician character Anton Gorodetsky, a member of the Night Watch. Events in each of the prologues, as well as intermittent other events in the stories, are written in a third person narrative and take place entirely outside of Gorodetsky's presence. The entire novel is written in the past tense.

== Summary ==
=== Destiny ===
Anton Gorodetsky, a mage, is reassigned to field work with the Night Watch. He is tasked with tracking vampires who have been hunting and killing humans without a licence. As he follows a young boy (Egor), who has been magically lured by two vampires through the Metro, he notices a young woman, Svetlana, surrounded by a vortex of "damnation". Trying to free her from the vortex he uses up the power of an amulet he has been given to use against the vampires, but only succeeds in temporarily reducing the curse upon her. He finds the vampires who have been calling Egor. In the struggle to arrest them, he is forced to kill one. The other, a woman, gets away.

He returns to the Night Watch headquarters, where his boss, Boris Ignatievich, informs him that he could be in danger as Zabulon (head of the Day Watch) might want revenge for his actions in killing Dark Others and gives him an owl called Olga, to be his Watch partner. It emerges later that she began life as a human sorceress, now trapped in an owl's body. The next day he breaks the law to use his powers for good (by changing a person's morality, a spell called "remoralization") and clashes with a Dark Other from the Day Watch, Alisa Donnikova. They agree that Alisa can use her power to do a minor evil act of her choice in compensation for his own act of goodness.

Anton goes to Egor's apartment to protect the latter from the vampire. Egor slips into the Twilight by mistake. Egor is also a latent Other, with the potential for using magic. Meanwhile, Boris Ignatievich sends an incubus, Ignat, to the cursed woman, Svetlana Nazarova, as an undercover agent to try to help her and discover who could have cursed her, but to no avail. Anton, who is still involved in trying to calm Egor and persuade him to join the forces of light, is urgently called away to assist with Svetlana, and in the meantime, the vampiress again calls to Egor who joins her on the roof.

Anton find sthat Svetlana is also an unaware Other who had cursed herself without meaning to out of guilt for something she did to her mother. He defuses the situation. He returns to Egor's roof to find the vampiress and Egor, as well as other Light and Dark operatives, including Anton's neighbour, Kostya Saushkin, who is a vampire. Zabulon joins them and attacks Anton. But when he does, one of the minor Light Mages, Ilya, reveals himself to be Boris, who'd swapped their bodies, and blocks Zabulon's efforts. While Zabulon's plans seem compromised, and Egor is still considering his choice for Light or Dark, Alisa uses her agreement with Anton to perform a spell on him making him tell Egor everything. Anton reveals to Egor that he was a pawn used by both Boris Ignatievich and Zabulon in their intrigues. Egor leaves the roof, feeling misused and veering towards the dark.

=== Among His Own Kind ===
A Dark Other, Galina Rogova, is killed by Maxim, a mysterious murderer using an enchanted wooden dagger, referring to himself as "The Judge". Boris Ignatievich announces that the Day Watch suspects one of the Night Watch operatives of this and previous murders. Everyone seems to have an alibi except Anton. Boris Ignatievich thinks that Anton has been set up by the Day Watch, and uses his powers to swap Anton and Olga's bodies so that anyone tracking him will be misled about his true whereabouts, and ensure any future murders will take place when he has a firm alibi. In Olga's body, Anton then goes with Svetlana to her apartment to hide, where he reveals that he is in fact Anton, making Svetlana furious as she just told "Olga" she loved Anton.

They go to a restaurant so as to have clear witnesses of their whereabouts and there spot an inoffensive Dark Other with his family. The Dark Other goes to the toilet, where Maxim was waiting and kills him. Anton, curious why the Dark Other had not returned from the toilet, briefly leaves Svetlana and discovers the body. An investigation ensues involving police and both Dark and Light forces, where Svetlana is able to give Boris a telepathic image of Maxim's wife's aura, but is unable to recall Maxim, who had also been dining in the restaurant. Zabulon recognises Anton in Olga's body, charging him with the murder. Anton flees, pursued by Zabulon and grabs a lift from a passing car whose driver sees the magical events as a gangland shooting. What Anton doesn't know is that the couple in the car are Maxim and his wife. Walking home, Anton calls Olga and asks to switch back bodies.

Waiting in the subway for Olga, Anton stumbles upon Egor and has a brief conversation with him. Olga arrives and Anton and Olga switch bodies using an incantation that reveals Boris's real name as Gesar. While talking to Olga, Anton realizes that the Day Watch is only chasing him in order to make Svetlana angry and use her powers illegally, which would allow them to use the law to neutralize her as an agent of Light. There is no crime in the Dark eliminating its own agents, only if the light does so. Anton then takes a ride in the metro where he is chased by a dark other. An apparition indicates that he should go to the Ostankino Tower, but Anton cannot tell whether it means to help or harm him. He kills the Dark mage chasing him and disguises himself as the mage. Arriving at the tower he finds that the Day Watch has established their temporary headquarters there. Secretly penetrating inside, he sees a bunch of incompetent Dark mages directing the search for him. Suspicious that Zabulon is taking revenge on him by setting him up still more, he leaves the tower and goes to Egor's house.

Meanwhile, Maxim feels the presence of a Dark being and goes on a hunt. He finally finds the Dark being and is astonished when he discovers it is young Egor. Anton spots them and talks with Maxim, explaining the Treaty between Light and Dark, but Maxim doesn't comply, pointing out that Egor will grow up to be a dark mage, and it's better to kill him now. Anton intervenes when Maxim tries to kill Egor, and they fight in the Twilight. Anton realizes that killing Maxim would mean that all witnesses proving his innocence would be dead, and allows himself to be non-fatally stabbed by Maxim. Gesar then comes over and suggests that Maxim should become a member of the Inquisition, and when Anton brags about how he outwitted Zabulon again, Gesar reveals that Zabulon has nothing to do with it and that all of this was planned by the Night Watch to raise Svetlana's magical level.

=== All for My Own Kind ===
An old man arrives from Uzbekistan and is intercepted by a team of Dark Others led by Alisa, who attacks him thinking he possesses a coveted artifact. As they fight, his son slips away unnoticed with the artifact.

All of the Night Watch operatives go to Tiger Cub's house to relax, but Anton doesn't manage to have fun, as he is concerned with Svetlana's growing powers influencing their relationship and the reason Gesar sent them off. He finally leaves, and when he gets back to his apartment, he discovers Zabulon calmly reading a newspaper and waiting for him. Zabulon reveals that Alisher, the young man from Uzbekistan, brought with him an artifact, a piece of chalk. Anton's research suggests that it is the Chalk of Fate and that it could be used by the Light to rewrite destiny, allowing someone to change the world to establish a new world order. Discussions with Olga and later Gesar reveal that Svetlana in fact is to use the Chalk to rewrite a destiny.

Walking outside, Anton drains the Light power from all of the passers-by he sees, taking their joy away. Anton joins Gesar, Svetlana, Zabulon, Egor, and Maxim on a rooftop where Svetlana prepares to rewrite a destiny, while a storm is gathering around them. Svetlana then opens the book of destiny. Gesar supposes Anton could use all the energy he has drained to stop the storm, but Anton uses it instead on himself via a simple remoralization spell. Astonished, Svetlana stops rewriting Egor's destiny and asks Anton for advice, but Anton says that she must decide what to write herself. The Book disappears, and Gesar notices she didn't write anything, she only erased things. Egor reverts from a potential Dark Other back to an unaffiliated state. Zabulon notices that their planned operation failed because of Svetlana's indecisiveness and, triumphant, leaves. Anton then notices the Chalk Svetlana used is not whole. Gesar reveals that Svetlana rewriting Egor's destiny was just a distraction, and in the meantime, Olga rewrote the destiny of someone later revealed. Gesar reveals the true nature of this plan was to save his love of Olga. Without her full powers, their love was doomed.

== Races ==
Within the Night Watch universe there are several different races with different characteristics and levels of power.

- Magicians Magicians of low levels are common among both the Light side and Dark Others. Magicians may specialize in the power of Foresight, Healing, Cursing and Hexing, Battle Magic, or any number of other abilities.
- Enchantress/Sorceress A terms for a female magician, such as Olga, Svetlana and Yulia. Svetlana comments that the difference between enchantresses and witches lies in the way their powers manifest – witches use charms, rhymes and various external aids to work their magic, whereas enchantresses use gestures and incantation to direct Twilight power. A witch is harmless if she is stripped naked and her body is shaved, whereas to render an enchantress harmless requires gagging her and tying her hands.
- Shapeshifters Shapeshifters can change into animal form, often used for magical battle. Shapeshifters seem to choose one animal type for their transformations. Shapeshifters are found in both Light and Dark Others, although the term shapeshifter itself is used for Dark Others, whereas many Light Others prefer the term "transformer magician".
- Vampires Vampires are considered Low Others, and especially disrespected among their fellow Dark Others. Vampires can be born or turned, but all are undead and soul-less. All vampires are born with a hunger for blood; some choose to drink only donated blood but hunting licenses for humans can be obtained. They are able to eat normal human food, but it is tasteless to them. They can go out in daylight, but they do not like strong sunlight. Male vampires can only father one child. Kostya and his parents are vampires.
- Werewolves A Dark substype of Shapeshifters.
- Incubus/Succubus A type of Other who possess great charisma and sexual appeal, which is their main ability.
- Witch Witches differ from magicians in that they do not draw power directly from the Twilight, instead they create artifacts which slowly accumulate large amounts of power over time. This is an advantage and a disadvantage. If a witch wishes to move to the higher levels of power, she must sacrifice the youthful appearance enchantresses maintain (though they may use illusion to appear however they wish).
- Devona A human of low intelligence invested with large amounts of power in order to make them a servant. Alisher's father was a devona created by Gesar. It is not a socially acceptable status for the individual concerned, who often finds himself shunned and rejected.
- Golem Creature created from various materials (e.g. clay, wood, metal) by a magician for a particular purpose, such as guarding.
- Warlock A male Witch (Dark Other).

== The Twilight (The Gloom) ==
Note: Bromfield's English translation translates the Russian word "sumrak" as "twilight", although "sumrak" actually refers to a state of coming darkness in singular (visible in one place, not the whole sky); "sumerki", which would usually be translated as "twilight", is its plural form. "The gloom" is the translation used in the movies based on the novel. Note that the Russian word sumrak does not have the negative emotional connotation of the English word gloom; sumrak has a lighter connotation, characterised by Nabokov as a "not infrequently pleasurable and poetical gloom." One can only assume why the translator dismissed closer in connotation the "dusk" and "dim" .

=== Properties ===
The Twilight, although a realm of existence beneath the human or ordinary world and therefore not sentient, indiscriminately absorbs energy from whoever enters it. An Other enters the Twilight by stepping into their own shadow, it then starts to drain their strength. The only way to survive in the Twilight is to slowly feed it energy. The skill required to stay (or even enter) into the Twilight for an extended period of time is acquired through formal training. Others who lack this skill yet still manage to enter the Twilight are at an increased risk of being completely drained of their life and energy.

The nature of Twilight is not fully elucidated in the first novel. It is composed of seven levels, each layer requires geometrically more power to enter and remain in. Each layer is quite different from the layer above it. Most powerful Others can't make it past the 3rd layer, a higher magician can penetrate down to the 5th layer. A Magician beyond classification such as Gesar or Zabulon can get to the 6th layer. Only a zero point magician can get to the 7th. Zero point magicians have come into being only once every thousand years or so.

There are stories of magicians who have been lost to the Twilight either because they exhausted their energy in battle (within the Twilight), or because they were careless. Novices have also been lost to the Twilight because they have allowed it to take too much energy; they lack the skill to "feed" the Twilight. Some greatly powerful Others decide to fade into Twilight when they have grown tired of the world.

"Regular" laws of physics, that is, the laws of physics present in the ordinary (human) world do not apply in the Twilight. Unless enchanted, physical objects can only affect beings on the first level. A nuclear blast extends all the way down, through every level. This is why the Watches have done everything in their power to prevent nuclear wars.

Others' auras have color in the Twilight as do their emotions and the magic that they manifest. The colors present in or around an Other in the Twilight can be read in order to gauge their feelings.

The Twilight imbues the Others with most of their magical powers. It is also responsible for giving them their unnaturally (in human terms) long lives. Due to the Twilight, Others can live to be hundreds, possibly even thousands, of years old. This is because, unlike regular humans, they absorb rather than produce magic. The process of absorbing magic also extends their life. The more powerful the Other the less magic they produce, and the more they must absorb from regular humans.

The Others have a twilight form that they can take on in or out of the Twilight. Most Dark Others take on the form of a demon like figure. Zabulon takes on the form of a red, rock-skinned demon with horns and a tail, also with slits for eyes and a forked tongue. Many Light Others take the form of white glowing Angels.

=== Levels ===
The Twilight itself is divided into several levels. Each level is harder to get to and accessible only to powerful Others; this is due in large part to the fact that the Twilight drains energy much more quickly and greedily in deeper levels. In order to access the lower levels of the Twilight, an Other must step through their shadow at each successive level.

At the first level the Twilight is a gray or sepia-toned version of the human world where time runs much more slowly than in the human world; this means that you can do more in the Twilight in less time than it would take in the human world. In this level remnants of the human world still exist and can be seen. For instance, humans can be seen but they are sepia-toned and are moving at a much slower rate due to the time difference between the two realms. This level is inhabited by a parasite, a blue moss feeding on energy, which doesn't seem to do any harm to those who enter the Twilight, and is easy to eradicate. Contrary to what we see in the movie, there are no mosquitoes in this level of Gloom.

The second level is even less like the human world—all human buildings and people disappear, but all magically built buildings change into a different version of itself. It is described as being darker, and having a consistency that is comparable to clouds. There are also three moons.

The third and deeper levels are not explored in the first book.

=== Inhabitants ===
The Twilight is accessible only to Others (both living and dead), particular magical objects, and certain animals. Others access the Twilight by raising their shadow, increasing its volume and density, then stepping through it.

As mentioned before, particular magical objects can enter the Twilight. However, it is not so much that they can enter the Twilight as that they exist on multiple levels of reality. For example, a copper amulet in the human world may be seen existing in the Twilight as a small ball of fire.

Night Watch hinted that animals do not always follow the same rules as humans or Others when it comes to the Twilight. In the first book of Night Watch entitled Story One: Destiny, Anton explains that "For cats there is no [human] world or Twilight—they live in all the worlds at once."

There is only one natural inhabitant in the Twilight, a dark blue moss that grows along many surfaces of the sepia-toned human world in the first level of the Twilight. It feeds off of the emotional energy of Others who enter into the Twilight and of humans in the ordinary world. There is a theory mentioned in the books that states that large colonies of dark blue moss can unbalance the human psyche and cause psychosis but it has not been proven. Nonetheless, the protagonist of the Night Watch—Anton—occasionally feels compelled to utilize magic to burn off the blue moss at points in the story.

=== Mysteries ===
The Twilight remains largely unknown. This may be because few magicians can navigate its levels. Night Watch mentions that the deepest levels have been navigated by Zabulon, though it requires significant energy expenditure even for him.

When an Other dies of natural causes, is killed, or dematerialised (executed) their "soul" or "essence" is passed into the Twilight where it remains for all eternity. Since Others are 'born' in the Twilight it would make sense for them to return there upon their death but the reason for this is never stated in Night Watch. They become spectral-like figures, cloudy silhouettes of their former physical selves. It remains a mystery whether or not they retain any memory or feeling as they hardly communicate with living Others who enter the Twilight.

In the second part of the Night Watch, what is assumed to be a dematerialised Other in the Twilight seemingly communicates with Anton as it points him towards the TV tower where the Day Watch has set up its field headquarters as it searches for Anton (who is being framed for killing Dark Others). Anton is unsure if it is a dematerialised Other, or if it is simply a part of a trap put into place by Zabulon.

== Characters ==
=== Light Others ===
- Anton Gorodetsky (Light Mage): the main character of the novel (most of the novel is written in the first-person from his point of view), he is a reluctant member of the Night Watch. In the beginning of the first book, he prefers mundane, technical jobs to actual field work. The events of the series force him to step up and become a full-fledged operative. They also make him considerably more cynical about the cause of the Light Others. His favorite pastime is listening to randomly arranged custom mini-discs. He is a fifth level mage at the beginning of the first novel, but later becomes a second level magician and eventually a Grand Mage. He possesses a pistol with silver bullets for protection from vampires and werewolves.
- Boris Ignatievich/Gesar (Grand Light Mage): an ancient mage of Tibetan descent who taught a number of heroes and philosophers during his lifetime. He moved to Europe during the early 15th century. Although he has had many opportunities to advance to high-level posts within Night Watch, he chose to remain a Regional Director of the Moscow division (the Moscow division is the de facto head of all other former USSR divisions). Gesar is a battle-hardened tactician who has been known to turn devastating defeats into small victories. He cares a great deal about his subordinates, though he does not hesitate to put them in harm's way for the sake of the greater good. His mage level is Beyond Classification (i.e. does not fit into the 1–7 scale).
- Svetlana (Grand Light Sorceress): a young doctor who is not aware of her powers at the beginning of the novel, a victim of a plot by Zabulon to kill her before she joins the Night Watch. Her power is discovered when she inadvertently curses herself; Svetlana's powers are so strong that the curse develops into an enormous vortex that threatens to unleash the Inferno and destroy Moscow. She enters into a relationship with Anton which becomes strained as Svetlana's powers continue to increase exponentially.
- Olga (Grand Light Sorceress): an old friend and an occasional lover of Geser who was turned into an owl for breaking obligations she had to the Light. She was allowed to change back to her human form during wartime, for half an hour every day. Thanks to Geser's manipulations, she was restored to her human form and regained her powers by the end of Night Watch.
- Semyon (Light Mage): a crusty, experienced mage with a wryly cynical outlook on the world. Unlike many of his fellow mages, he is a capable fighter even without his magic. Unlike most mages, he is capable of "reading" people the same way a normal person would—by body language, as opposed to magic.
- Tiger Cub/Katya (Shifter-Mage): a young, playful mage with a penchant for jewels and amulets. She is highly regarded both by Dark and Light Others. It is said that she can charm anyone. As the name implies, she shapeshifts to tiger as her preferred animal form. She has a large house riddled with secret passages and guarded by dogs trained to attack Others (normally animals are afraid of Others). She can be rather impulsive, which gets her in trouble on several occasions.
- Bear (Shifter-Mage): a reclusive, quiet mage known for his calculated, brutal tactics. It has been continuously speculated that he was originally a Dark Other, despite the well-known fact that once the choice is made, the Others can not change sides. His preferred animal form is a large polar bear. He is frequently partnered with Tiger Cub.
- Ignat (Light Incubus/Succubus): a self-absorbed mage with "[the] face of a Hollywood actor and [the] body of a Greek god". He prides himself on being able to bed any woman (or man). As a result, he takes failure very hard.
- Garik (Light Mage): a shy mage infamous for his bad luck with women. His father is a Dark Other.
- Igor (Light Mage): an idealistic mid-level mage. Despite his youthful appearance, he was born in the late 1920s. He is dedicated to the cause of Light Others, though his refusal to compromise his principles has occasionally caused problems.
- Yulia (Light Mage): a smart young girl who works at the Night Watch as an analytical sorceress. Yulia admires Tiger Cub.
- Ilya (Light Mage): a first-level mage who swapped bodies with Geser in Story One: Destiny to trick Zabulon. He is said to be a powerful mage. He wears glasses.

=== Dark Others ===
- Zabulon (spelled Zavulon in the English subtitles in the film version; the spelling "Zabulon" reflects the Old Testament source of the name) (Grand Dark Mage): an ancient schemer about the same age as Gesar. He runs the Day Watch in Moscow and his plans frequently involve misdirection and hidden agendas. His power seems to rival that of Gesar, but he is often outwitted, if not overpowered, by Gesar. His true form has taken on demonic characteristics because he has spent a great deal of time in the Twilight. His chosen human appearance is often misleading, as he appears as a thin intellectual who does not seem to be a threat to those who do not know him.
- Alisa Donnikova (Dark Witch): a young witch with a penchant for mischief and discreet mind manipulation. She was Zabulon's lover until the end of the novel.
- Kostya (Konstantin Saushkin) (young Vampire): a young, idealistic vampire living above Anton, whose family Anton befriended even before he had become an Other. Anton's actions during the first part of Night Watch drive a wedge between them.

=== Unaffiliated ===
- Maxim (Inquisitor): a middle-class Light Other whose powers emerged before Night Watch could find him. Feeling compelled to seek out evil, he hunted and killed low-level Dark Others. Upon discovering the truth about the Others, he was recruited into the Inquisition.
- Egor (spelled Yegor in the English subtitles of the film version): a shy, seemingly ordinary young boy. He was ambushed by a pair of renegade vampires in the beginning of Night Watch. Egor is a very rare case, having a 'clean slate'. His aura shows his fate to be undetermined. In the second part of Night Watch, it is revealed that Yegor is destined to join the side of the Dark. However, at the very end of the novel his destiny is partially re-written and he remains unaffiliated. His potential mage level is very low (6 or 7).

== Film, TV or theatrical adaptations ==
Two films based on the novel, 2004's Night Watch and the 2006 follow-up Day Watch, have been produced. (The Day Watch film is based on the second and the third part of the novel, not the follow-up novel Day Watch.) In 2005, Nival Interactive released the video game Night Watch, based on both the novel and film adaptation.

== Cultural references ==
- When talking to Olga about earlier 'Light Other' social experiments like Communism, Anton asks if the next attempt would be a "Brave New World?"
- During their first conversation, Olga says to Anton "You're kidding, young man" (in Russian: "Шутишь, парниша"), which is a memorable quote from Twelve Chairs. Anton then wonders whether she does any reading in owl form.
