= Vladimir Vasilyev (writer) =

Russian writer

- Владимир Васильев
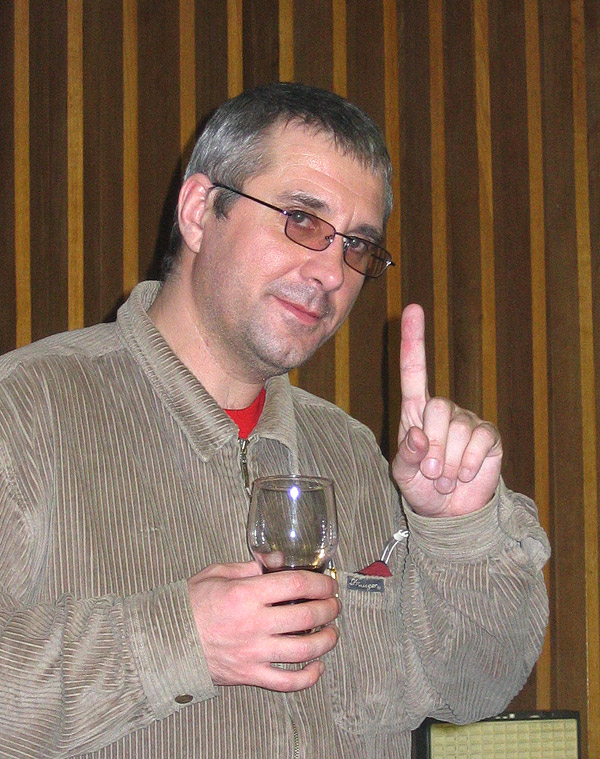
- Vasilyev in 2006
- Born: August 8, 1967 (age 59); Mykolaiv, Ukrainian SSR, Soviet Union
- Occupations: Novelist; short story writer; musician
- Writing career
- Pen name: Vokha, Boxa
- Years active: 1991–present
- Genres: Science fiction; fantasy
- Website: vasilyev.com

Vladimir Nikolaevich Vasilyev (Russian: Владимир Николаевич Васильев, Ukrainian: Володимир Миколайович Васильєв, romanized: Volodymyr Mykolayovych Vasyliev; born August 8, 1967) is a Ukrainian science fiction writer and musician.

== Bibliography ==
=== Series ===
- Shandalar (Шандалар)
  - Cloudy Land (Облачный край), 1994
  - One Year of Life (Год жизни), 1996
  - Otran's Black Stone (Черный камень Отрана), 1996
- Blades (Клинки)
  - Blades (Клинки), 1996
  - A Thicket's Soul (Душа чащобы), 1996
- Big Kiev (Большой Киев)
  - The Big Kiev Technician a.k.a. Hunt for Wild Trucks (Техник Большого Киева/Охота на дикие грузовики), 1997
  - The Big Kiev Witcher (Ведьмак Большого Киева), 1999–2009
- Death or Glory (Смерть или слава)
  - Death or Glory (Смерть или слава), 1998
  - Black Relay Race (Черная эстафета), 1999
  - Mobility War (Война за мобильность)
    - Giants' Legacy (Наследие исполинов), 2002
    - No One but Us (Никто, кроме нас), 2005

As Vasilyev noted in an interview, "Death or Glory was written under the impression from David Brin's duology Startide Rising and The Uplift War". While a relative success in Russia (17,000 copied of Death or Glory issued by 2000), the novel was only POD published in English in 2004 by Capricorn Publishing.

- Wolf Nature (Волчья натура)
  - Wolf Nature (Волчья натура), 1999
  - Everyone With Beast Inside (Зверь в каждом из нас), 2000
- World of Watches (Мир Дозоров)
  - Day Watch (Дневной дозор), 2000 with Sergey Lukyanenko
  - Black Palmira's Face (Лик Черной Пальмиры), 2003
  - Time of Inversions (Время инверсий), 2012
- The Altitude (Высота)
  - The Skies Masters (Хозяева поднебесья), 2001
  - A Chorister Owl Trill (Трель певчей совы), 1996

=== Single novels ===
- UFO: Enemy Unknown (UFO: Враг Неизвестен), 1997. Novelization of the game UFO: Enemy Unknown.
- Going Into The Night (Идущие в Ночь), 1999 with Anna Kitayeva (Lee).
- Three Steps on Dankarten (Три шага на Данкартен), 2000
- Hot Start a.k.a. Hearts and Engines (Горячий старт/Сердца и Моторы), 2002
- Antarctica-online (Антарктида-online), 2004 with Alexander Gromov
- The "Capudania"'s Treasure (Сокровище "Капудании"), 2007
- The Shadows of Future (Тени грядущего), 2009 with Konstantin Utolin and Roman Arilin
- Hide-and-Seek on Centre Line (Прятки на осевой), 2010 - novel in cross-author cycle of S.T.A.L.K.E.R. game Universe
- Children of a duplicator (Дети дупликатора), 2011 - novel in cross-author cycle of S.T.A.L.K.E.R. game Universe

=== Short story collections ===
- The Warrior Sign (Знак воина), 1996
- A Boarding in Cyberspace (Абордаж в киберспейсе), 1997
- A Stars over Shandalar (Звезды над Шандаларом), 1999 - Shandalar stories under one cover.
- A Jolly Roger on Hydrofoil (Веселый Роджер на подводных крыльях), 2002
- Forgotten Road (Забытая дорога), 2003
- Unlucky Gentlemans (Джентльмены непрухи), 2006
- Foreigner Worlds (Чужие миры), 2006
- The Subway Genius (Гений подземки), 2007
- The Unknown Earth (Незнакомка Земля), 2008

== Awards ==
- Aelita, awarded for contribution into science fiction

== Music ==
Vladimir Vasilyev is also a guitar player and is also known as a singer and composer. In his songs, Vasilyev uses fantastical and unrealistic motifs. His most well-known song is "Battlecat's March" (Марш Бойцовых котов), which has an allusion to Arkady and Boris Strugatsky's novel The Kid from Hell ("Парень из Преисподней").

Albums

- The Ambush-92 (Засада-92)
- Live in Kharkiv (Концерт в Харькове)
- Overdue confession 2014 (with "Prospekt Mira" band)
