= Day Watch (film) =

2006 film by Timur Bekmambetov

- US theatrical release poster
- Дневной Дозор (Russian)
- Directed by: Timur Bekmambetov
- Screenplay by: Sergei Lukyanenko; Timur Bekmambetov; Alexander Talal
- Based on: The Night Watch by Sergei Lukyanenko
- Produced by: Konstantin Ernst; Anatoli Maksimov
- Starring: Konstantin Khabensky; Mariya Poroshina; Aleksei Chadov; Gosha Kutsenko; Igor Lifanov; Jeanna Friske
- Cinematography: Sergei Trofimov
- Edited by: Dmitry Kiselyov
- Music by: Yuri Poteyenko
- Production companies: Channel One Russia; Bazelevs Company; Tabbak
- Distributed by: Gemini Film (CIS and Baltics); Fox Searchlight Pictures (International)
- Release date: 1 January 2006
- Running time: 131 minutes
- Country: Russia
- Languages: Russian; Kazakh
- Budget: $4.2 million
- Box office: $42.9 million

Day Watch (Note: Russian: Дневной Дозор, romanized: Dnevnoj Dozor, IPA: [dʲnʲɪvˈnoj dɐˈzor]) is a 2006 Russian fantasy film directed and co-written by Timur Bekmambetov. It opened in theatres across Russia on 1 January 2006, the United States on 1 June 2007, and the United Kingdom on 5 October 2007. It is a sequel to the 2004 film Night Watch, featuring the same cast. Despite sharing its title with the second novel in the series, it is actually based on the second and third parts of Sergey Lukyanenko's novel Night Watch, the first part of which the 2004 film was based on.

== Plot ==
In the first film, Anton Gorodetsky was recruited into the Night Watch in 1992 after hiring a witch to cast a spell that would return his adulterous wife to him, even if it meant miscarrying her illegitimate child. Fourteen years later, he encounters two immensely powerful "Others": nurse Svetlana, who joins the Night Watch after becoming aware of her abilities; and 12 year-old Yegor, who Anton realizes is his own son (not his wife's lover's), and who turns against him and joins the Day Watch after realizing that his father (unknowingly) tried to kill him before he was born.

In 2006, Anton is responsible for training Svetlana, while secretly destroying evidence of Yegor's attacks on non-Others, trying both to protect his son and preserve the uneasy truce between Light and Dark. He is also seeking the legendary Chalk of Fate, a magical artifact with the power to rewrite history, which once belonged to Tamerlane and explained his numerous military successes.

Zavulon, the leader of the Day Watch, attempts to frame Anton for murdering several Dark Others. Gesser, the head of the Night Watch, attempts to protect Anton by having him switch bodies with Olga, a female sorceress, and ordering Svetlana to stay glued to his side. Svetlana, unaware of the switch, confides to "Olga" that she loves Anton and asks how he feels about her. When she becomes aware of the switch, she is initially furious, but Anton is pushed to admit that he loves her as well. Despite the ruse, the Day Watch successfully frames Anton for another murder.

Anton obtains the Chalk of Fate from its hiding place in Moscow and uses it to summon Yegor. They seem to be reconciling, until Anton refuses Yegor's request that he reconcile with Yegor's mother. Yegor quickly learns that his father has feelings for Svetlana and leaves with the Chalk. Because Zavulon cannot use the Chalk without violating the truce, he gives it to his lover Alisia, knowing what she will do with it.

Anton crashes Yegor's birthday party to expose the true culprit for the murders: the father of his vampire neighbor, Kostya. But disaster strikes when Svetlana follows him to the party and gets into an argument with Yegor. She accidentally strikes Yegor and spills a drop of his blood, which Zavulon uses as a pretext to break the truce and declare all-out war on the Light Others.

Yegor, now a Great Other, unleashes an apocalypse upon Moscow, killing most of the guests and blinding Svetlana. The city is nearly destroyed and a fierce battle between Light and Dark follows. In the chaos, Anton finds Alisia, trying without success to use the Chalk to revive her dead lover, Kostya. Anton persuades her to give him the Chalk, explaining that it can only be used to reverse the user's own decisions, not anyone else's. Just as she gives it to him, Anton is caught in a magical duel between Svetlana and Yegor, but saved by Gesser.

Anton runs to the ruins of the apartment building where he met the witch in 1992 and writes "NO" on the wall with the Chalk. History re-sets to 1992, where the young Anton decides against making his deal with the witch and leaves her apartment. The destruction of Moscow is averted, and Anton never realizes he is an Other.

However, as he exits the building, Svetlana walks past him. Zavulon and Gesser watch them from a park bench, eager to see if Anton will recognize Svetlana, despite now having never met her because of the rewriting of history. Gesser turns out to be right: despite not knowing how or why, Anton recognizes Svetlana and runs after her. They walk off together, implied to be destined to have a happier relationship than the one they had in the original timeline.

== Cast ==
- Konstantin Khabensky as Anton
- Mariya Poroshina as Svetlana
- Vladimir Menshov as Gesser
- Viktor Verzhbitsky as Zavulon
- Dmitriy Martynov as Yegor
- Galina Tyunina as Olga
- Zhanna Friske as Alisa
- Aleksei Chadov as Kostya
- Valeri Zolotukhin as Kostya's father
- Nurzhuman Ikhtymbayev as Zoar
- Aleksei Maklakov as Semyon
- Aleksandr Samojlenko as Bear
- Irina Yakovleva as Galina Rogova
- Gosha Kutsenko as Ignat
- Yegor Dronov as Tolik
- Emir Baigazin as young Tamerlane

== Production ==
Roughly 20 visual effects vendors were used for the 800 shots using visual effects, compared to Night Watch's 400 effects; the main studio was the visual effects supervisor Vladimir Leschinski's Dr. Picture Studios. It took about a year to complete the visual effects.

== Release ==
Day Watch opened in theaters across Russia on 1 January 2006, in the United States on 1 June 2007, and the United Kingdom on 5 October 2007. 20th Century Fox through its Fox Searchlight Pictures label paid $2 million to acquire the worldwide distribution rights (excluding Russia and the Baltic states) of this film.

== Reception ==
=== Critical response ===
On the review aggregator website Rotten Tomatoes, 62% of 94 critics' reviews are positive, with an average rating of 6/10. The website's consensus reads: "Day Watch is frequently cheesy but it offers enough twists, surprises, and inventive action sequences to maintain viewer interest." Metacritic, which uses a weighted average, assigned the film a score of 59 out of 100, based on 12 critics, indicating "mixed or average" reviews.

Leslie Felperin from Variety wrote that the sequel would satisfy fans of the original but also criticized its longer runtime.

== Home media ==
20th Century Fox Home Entertainment released Day Watch on DVD on 30 October 2007, and on Blu-ray on 9 September 2008.
