= Night Watch (2004 film) =

2004 Russian film

- English-language release poster
- Ночной Дозор (Russian)
- Directed by: Timur Bekmambetov
- Screenplay by: Timur Bekmambetov; Laeta Kalogridis
- Based on: The Night Watch; 1998 novel by Sergei Lukyanenko
- Produced by: Konstantin Ernst; Anatoli Maksimov
- Starring: Konstantin Khabensky; Vladimir Menshov; Valeri Zolotukhin; Mariya Poroshina; Galina Tyunina
- Cinematography: Sergei Trofimov
- Edited by: Dmitriy Kiselev
- Music by: Yuri Poteyenko
- Production companies: Channel One Russia; Bazelevs Company; Tabbak
- Distributed by: Gemini Film (CIS and Baltics); Fox Searchlight Pictures (International)
- Release date: 8 July 2004 (Russia)
- Running time: 123 minutes (Original version); 114 minutes (International version)
- Country: Russia
- Language: Russian
- Budget: $4.2 million
- Box office: $50.3 million

Night Watch (Note: Russian: Ночной Дозор, romanized: Nočnoj Dozor, IPA: [nɐtɕˈnoj dɐˈzor]) is a 2004 Russian urban fantasy supernatural thriller film directed by Timur Bekmambetov who wrote the screenplay along with Laeta Kalogridis. It is loosely based on the 1998 novel The Night Watch by Sergei Lukyanenko.

It was Russia's submission to the 77th Academy Awards for the Academy Award for Best Foreign Language Film, but was not accepted as a nominee. The film received a limited theatrical release in the United States, where it grossed $1.5 million. It overperformed in the American home video market, generating more than $9.5 million in home video sales and $12 million in home video rentals. It received mixed reviews from critics. A sequel, Day Watch, was released in 2006.

== Plot ==
Since the beginning of time, there have been "Others" – humans endowed with supernatural abilities – and for just as long, the Others have been divided between the forces of Light and Dark. In Medieval times, the armies of both sides met by chance, and a great battle began. Seeing that neither side had a clear advantage, the two faction leaders, Geser and Zavulon, called a truce and each side commissioned a police-like force to ensure it was kept; the Light side's force was called the Night Watch and the Dark side's force was called the Day Watch.

In 1992 Moscow, Anton Gorodetsky (Russian: Антон Городецкий) visits a witch named Daria and asks her to cast a spell to return his wife to him, agreeing that she should miscarry her illegitimate child as part of it. Just as the spell is about to be completed, two figures burst in and restrain Daria, preventing her from completing the spell. When they notice that Anton is able to see them, they realize that he is also an Other.

Twelve years later, Anton has enlisted in the Night Watch. While policing Moscow, he encounters several portents that Geser says are linked to an ancient prophecy of an immensely powerful Other that will end the stalemate between Light and Dark, but will be more likely to join the Dark. Anton's investigations lead him to a nurse, Svetlana, whom disaster seems to follow everywhere, and a young boy named Yegor.

In the film's climax, Anton prevents a catastrophic storm from leveling Moscow, when he realizes that Svetlana is an Other, and begins teaching her to control her power. But in the process, Anton realizes that Yegor is his own son, and that his wife was pregnant with him when Anton tried to have a spell cast on her (believing, mistakenly, that the father of the child was his wife's lover, not himself). Learning that his own father tried to kill him before he was born turns Yegor – the Other of the prophecy – against Anton and towards Zavulon, which was the latter's plan all along. In helpless rage, Anton strikes Zavulon, while saying in voice over that, although the prophecy has come true and the Dark's victory seems inevitable, he will not give up (Note: The international version replaces Anton's voice over with a narration stating that the prophecy has been fulfilled, but as long as people believe in Light there is hope).

== Cast ==
- Konstantin Khabensky as Anton Gorodetsky
- Vladimir Menshov as Geser
- Viktor Verzhbitsky as Zavulon
- Mariya Poroshina as Svetlana
- Galina Tyunina as Olga
- Dmitry Martynov as Yegor
- Aleksei Chadov as Kostya Saushkin
- Yuriy "Gosha" Kutsenko as Ignat
- Rimma Markova as Daria Shultz
- Maria Mironova as Yegor's mother
- Valeri Zolotukhin as Gennady Saushkin, Kostya's father
- Zhanna Friske as Alicia Donnikova
- Nikolay Olyalin as inquisitor Maksim
- Ilya Lagutenko as Andrei
- Aleksei Maklakov as Semyon
- Aleksander Samoilenko as Ilya
- Anna Slyu as Katya
- Anna Dubrovskaya as Larisa
- Sergei Prikhodko as Pyotr
- Georgy Dronov as Tolik
- Igor Savochkin as Maksim Ivanovich
- Nurzhuman Ikhtymbaev as Zoar
- Kirill Kleimyonov as himself

== Production ==
In 2000, an independent Moscow company invited a director from St. Petersburg, Sergei Vinokurov, the script was written by Renata Litvinova. Artemy Troitsky was expected to star in the film as Anton Gorodetsky, and for the role of the light magician Geser Ivan Okhlobystin was chosen. But the work on the film stalled, which was largely in part of the tiny budget of 50 thousand dollars. And then Channel One, the government-owned TV channel, bought from the publisher the rights to adapt the novel and invited Timur Bekmambetov to write and direct the film.

Concerning the casting, Bekmambetov described that he needed an actor for the role of Gorodetsky who was handsome, slightly naive, slightly cunning and that "his eyes must show that he has a conscience".

Part of the challenge for such a fantasy film was creating hundreds of visual effects (VFX) shots to which a modern audience is accustomed. 16 Russian VFX studios and several freelancers were used, each chosen for their individual strengths. Many shots were created by different artists across different time zones, using the Internet to share data and images.

The film was the first big-budget Russian supernatural movie and one of the first blockbusters made after the collapse of the Soviet film industry. The film was produced by Channel One, with a budget of US$4.2 million. It was shot in a 1.85:1 aspect ratio.

=== Music ===
The film contains several songs from rock bands, e.g. "Jack" by the Belarusian group TT-34 and "Spanish" by Drum Ecstasy. The song played in the credits of the international version of the movie are "Shatter" and "Tender", both of which were performed by the Welsh rock band Feeder. The former track was a top 20 hit single in the United Kingdom charting at #11 in 2005, to coincide with the international release of the film. The song played during the end credits of the American release of Night Watch is "Fearless" by The Bravery and part of the movie's score. In the original Russian version it is a rap song Nochnoy dozor (Finalnyy rep) performed by Uma2rman.

The original score album by Yuri Poteyenko was released in 2021 by the Russian label Keepmoving Records in a limited edition with 300 copies. The score from the sequel (Day Watch) has been released in 2020 by the same label.

== Release ==
=== Russian release ===
After premiering at the Moscow Film Festival on 27 June 2004, it went on general cinema release across the CIS on 8 July 2004.

=== International release ===
The film attracted the attention of 20th Century Fox through its Fox Searchlight Pictures label, which paid $4 million to acquire the worldwide distribution rights (excluding Russia and the Baltic states) of Night Watch and its sequel Day Watch.

One year after the Russian release, the international distribution began. Other than a London premiere at the Odeon West End as part of the Frightfest horror film festival, that screened amid heavy security on 28 August 2005, the first European country outside CIS was Spain where it was released on 2 September 2005. By mid October it had been released in most European countries, and on 17 February 2006 it had a limited release in the United States, followed by a full release on 3 March. By 13 February 2006 (i.e. before the U.S. release) it had grossed US$32 million.

Original English language poster for Night Watch

The "international version" of the film was largely re-edited from the Russian version. In the prologue and epilogue, the Russian voice-over has been dubbed in English, but the characters' dialogue was kept in Russian, with stylized subtitles appearing in odd places around the screen, often animated to emphasise or complement the action. For example, in a scene in which Yegor is being called by a Dark vampire, he is in a pool and the camera is underwater. The caption appears as blood red text that dissolves as blood would in water. In another scene, as a character walks across the scene from left to right, the caption is revealed as his body crosses the screen. In addition, many of the scenes that were present in the Russian theatrical release were omitted, while, at the same time, some scenes were re-cut or added. The International version is shorter by 9 minutes.

The film was released on a two-disc DVD in the UK by 20th Century Fox on 24 April 2006, which featured both the Russian theatrical cut, labeled as the "director's cut", and the international cut. An American DVD release followed on June 20, 2006, which only contained the international cut. The US DVD release is double-sided, with one side carrying more traditional subtitles, and the other containing the stylized subtitles. The German DVD release also features the Russian theatrical cut in addition to the international cut.

The International version of both Night Watch and its sequel, Day Watch, are now available in HD on Vudu. The HDX encodes are based on the International release and retain the original Russian dialog track with the stylized subtitles.

== Reception ==
=== Box office ===
The film was extremely successful, becoming the highest-grossing Russian release ever, grossing US$16.7 million in Russia alone, thus grossing more in Russia than The Lord of the Rings: The Fellowship of the Ring.

=== Critical response ===
Night Watch holds a 59% rating on review aggregator website Rotten Tomatoes based on 128 reviews, with an average score of 6/10; the consensus states: "This Russian horror/fantasy film pits darkness and light against each other using snazzy CGI visuals to create an extraordinary atmosphere of a dank, gloomy city wrestling with dread." On Metacritic, the film has a weighted average score of 58 out of 100, based on 32 critics, indicating "mixed or average reviews".

Leslie Felperin from Variety noted the film's allusions to various classic sci-fi and horror pictures and praised the Moscow setting, eccentric characters, and lavish special effects.

Stephen Holden from The New York Times wrote that the picture is "narratively muddled and crammed with many more vampires, shape-shifters and sorcerers than one movie can handle, but it bursts with a sick, carnivorous glee in its own fiendish games".

Film directors Quentin Tarantino and Danny Boyle have highly praised the film.

In 2010, Empire published a list of one hundred best films in the history of world cinema — Night Watch took the hundredth place in it.

== "Nochnoi Bazar" fan re-dub ==
In 2005, a "fan re-dub" was released under the title "Nochnoi Bazar" ("Night Chat"). The project was started by the writer Sergei Lukyanenko as a nod to popular (illegal) fan re-dubs by "Goblin" (Dmitry Puchkov). However, this fan redub was made with full consent of the filmmakers and copyright holders and released on DVD by Channel One Russia. The script was written by the Russian comedian Alexander Bachilo, the song parodies were written and composed by Alexander Pushnoy. The narration was done by Leonid Volodarskiy, a popular voiceover translator of pirated video releases in the Soviet Union.

== Sequels ==
The sequel, Day Watch, was released across the CIS on 1 January 2006.

=== Franchise ===
A third film, titled Twilight Watch (previously Dusk Watch), was planned after 20th Century Fox bought the distribution rights to the first two movies, with the plan to have it be produced in English as opposed to Russian, however, production was ultimately halted when Timur Bekmambetov was hired to direct Wanted for Universal Pictures. He went on to say that Twilight Watch would be too much like Wanted, and so to avoid working in an artistic rut the project would need to be either distinctively changed, passed to another director, or simply delayed so that intervening projects could be completed.

== See also ==
- Vampire film
- List of Russian submissions for the Academy Award for Best Foreign Language Film
- List of submissions to the 77th Academy Awards for Best Foreign Language Film
