= Bilge Ebiri =

American journalist and filmmaker of Turkish origin

- Born: York, England
- Education: Yale University
- Occupations: Journalist; film critic; filmmaker
- Years active: 1995–present
- Employer: New York

Bilge Ebiri (Note: /ˈbɪlɡə ɛˈbɪəri/) (born 1973) is a British-American journalist, film critic, and filmmaker. His first feature film, New Guy, was released in 2004.

== Early life and education ==
Ebiri is of Turkish descent. He majored in film studies at Yale University, graduating in 1995. His thesis film, Bad Neighborhood, won the Lamar Prize for Achievement in Film.

== Career ==
After graduation from Yale, Ebiri worked as an assistant director for Nikita Mikhalkov on The Barber of Siberia. In 2003, Ebiri wrote, directed, and co-produced the low-budget feature film New Guy, which was released in 2004. It received favorable reviews in The New York Times and Variety, and had a successful theatrical run in New York City. Time Out called it "broadly predictable and increasingly one note, but passable sadistic fun." It was released on DVD in 2005 by Vanguard Cinema.

Ebiri was the lead film critic at The Village Voice for two years beginning in 2016, before returning to New York magazine and Vulture as film critic and editor in 2019.

== Filmography ==
- Bad Neighborhood (1995)
- Infernal Racket (1996)
- New Guy (2003)
- Purse Snatcher (2006)
- Görünmeyen (2011)
