= Shmakov =

Shmakov (Russian: Шмаков) is a Russian masculine surname, its feminine counterpart is Shmakova. It may refer to

- Igor Shmakov (1985–2011), Russian actor
- Vladimir Shmakov, Uzbekistani judoka
- Yevhen Shmakov (born 1985), Ukrainian football midfielder
