= Flights in Dreams and Reality =

Flights in Dreams and in Reality
- Directed by: Roman Balayan
- Written by: Viktor Merezhko
- Starring: Oleg Yankovsky; Lyudmila Gurchenko; Oleg Tabakov; Aleksandr Adabashyan; Oleg Menshikov
- Cinematography: Vilen Kalyuta
- Edited by: Yelena Lukashenko
- Music by: Vadim Khrapachov
- Production company: Dovzhenko Film Studios
- Release date: 1983
- Running time: 92 minutes
- Country: Soviet Union
- Language: Russian

Flights in Dreams and Reality (Russian: «Полёты во сне и наяву», romanized: Polyoty vo sne i nayavu) is a 1983 Soviet drama film directed by Roman Balayan, written by Viktor Merezhko, dealing with the subject matter of midlife crisis.

The film features many highly acclaimed Soviet/Russian actors, with Oleg Yankovsky in the starring role, as well as Lyudmila Gurchenko, Oleg Tabakov, Aleksandr Adabashyan and Oleg Menshikov in supporting roles.

== Plot ==
On the eve of his fortieth birthday, Sergei Makarov (Oleg Yankovsky) is summing up his life. But nothing brings satisfaction to him, neither wife, mistress, work, or friends.

At forty a person achieves many things, but previous ideals often lose their value. Sergei becomes completely confused, he is not bound to his wife with anything other than obligations, and he develops affection for a young girl named Alisa (Elena Kostina). Sergei is loved by a beautiful woman Larisa (Lyudmila Gurchenko), working with him at the drawing board, but he ignores her crush towards him. However, he uses her car, knowing that she is always willing to bail him out. Sergei's supervisor, Nikolai Pavlovich (Oleg Tabakov) loves her but without reciprocation. Alice has a boyfriend, a young guy (Oleg Menshikov), slickly wooing her. He easily wins against Sergei in arm wrestling, to which Sergei responds with shouting "cock-a-doodle-doo" under the table at his birthday party, to which all colleagues and his young sweetheart are invited.

The main character of the film begins to experience a middle-age crisis; it seems that a big part of everything he wanted, is in fact, nothing more than empty vanity. Constant feeling of discomfort and dissatisfaction makes the hero rush between the people and do strange things in the hope that there will be a change in his life, that something will happen what was previously unavailable.

"Oh, Sergei, Sergei, how jealous I was of you in college, ... but now, I regret it, everything about your life is topsy-turvy, – says Sergei's boss, Nicholai Pavlovich in a conversation in the kitchen, thus explaining Sergei's strange behavior which is evident to everyone. – Well, you are sick Sergei, do you not comprehend this?"

== Cast ==
- Oleg Yankovsky as Sergei Makarov
- Lyudmila Gurchenko as Larisa Kuzmina, Makarov's colleague and former lover
- Oleg Tabakov as Nikolai Pavlovich, Makarov's boss
- Lyudmila Ivanova as Nina, Makarov's colleague
- Lyudmila Zorina as Natasha, Makarov's wife
- Elena Kostina as Alice Suvorov, Makarov's mistress (voiced by Yelena Koreneva)
- Oleg Menshikov as Sergei Sinitsyn, Alice's friend
- Lybov Rudneva as Svetlana, Makarov's colleague
- Aleksandr Adabashyan as sculptor (voiced by Yuri Bogatyryov)
- Nikita Mikhalkov as director
- Elena Mikhailova as railway points operator (E. Cherniak, uncredited)
- Alena Odinokova as Masha, Makarov's daughter
- Valery Panarin as Makarov's friend

== Production ==
Famous actor/director Nikita Mikhalkov makes a cameo appearance in the film, playing a film director. The role of Sergei Makarov was originally designed with him in mind. But when working on the script, director Roman Balayan saw the TV film "We, the Undersigned" starring Oleg Yankovsky, and decided that he should play the main character.

== Release and awards ==
The film was not made available until early 1983, initially being granted a very limited release, and was not widely seen until the time of Perestroika. With the film being exposed to larger audiences, it went on to gain critical acclaim.

Yankovsky received the 1987 USSR State Prize for his role.

At the time of its release, politically minded viewers perceived it as a critique of Brezhnevian “stagnation”.
