= My Favorite Clown =

- Russian: Мой любимый клоун
- Directed by: Yuri Kushneryov
- Written by: Aleksandr Adabashyan; Vasiliy Livanov; Nikita Mikhalkov
- Starring: Oleg Menshikov; Ilya Tyurin; Vladimir Ilyin; Tatyana Dogileva; Natalya Sayko
- Cinematography: Igor Bek
- Edited by: Svetlana Lyashinskaya
- Music by: Olga Petrova
- Production company: Mosfilm
- Release date: 1986
- Running time: 86 min.
- Country: Soviet Union
- Language: Russian

My Favorite Clown (Russian: Мой любимый клоун, romanized: Moy lyubimyy kloun) is a 1986 Soviet romantic drama film directed by Yuri Kushneryov. The film tells about a young clown who adopts an orphanage in spite of all circumstances.

== Plot ==
A young circus performer, clown Sergey Sinitsyn (Oleg Menshikov), decides to adopt six-year-old orphan Vanya. Initially supportive, his wife Lesya, who struggles with infertility, begins to oppose the adoption under pressure from her mother, who boasts of her academician husband. Tensions escalate towards divorce. Meanwhile, Sergey and his best friend and partner Roman prepare a new act for an upcoming major circus tour. Vanya becomes a distraction, but Roman and his wife Alisa help Sergey care for him. Vanya frequently asks about his mother, and Sergey tells him she is away.

Just before the tour, Vanya falls ill, and Sergey stays home to care for him. Suddenly, Vanya’s condition worsens, and he urgently requires a blood transfusion from a rare blood type. Sergey once had a serious relationship with acrobat Polina, but they parted ways after a rumor spread by strongman Ryumin about Polina’s alleged affair with a German animal trainer during a tour. Despite the split, Polina still loves Sergey. Remembering her, Alisa calls Polina, who agrees to help, though she firmly tells Sergey what she thinks of him.

When Vanya awakens, he sees Polina by his bedside and asks her, “Mom, is that you? Have you come back?”

== Cast ==
- Oleg Menshikov as Sergei Sinitsin
- Ilya Tyurin as Vanya
- Vladimir Ilyin as Roman
- Tatyana Dogileva as Polina
- Natalya Sayko as Alisa Poldi
- Oleg Strizhenov as Dima
- Archil Gomiashvili as Fokin
- Olga Bityukova as Lesya Butterbardt
- Lionella Pyryeva as Malva
- Yevgeny Gavrilin as Ryumin
- Andrei Smirnov as doctor
