= Oleg Menshikov =

Russian actor, theater director and singer (born 1960)

- Олег Меньшиков
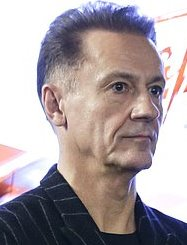
- Oleg Menshikov (2018)
- Born: Oleg Evgenyevich Menshikov; 8 November 1960 (age 65); Serpukhov, Moscow Oblast, Russian SFSR, Soviet Union
- Education: Mikhail Shchepkin Higher Theatre School
- Occupations: Actor; theatre director; singer
- Years active: 1980–present
- Spouse: Anastasia Chernova (m. 2005)

Oleg Evgenyevich Menshikov, PAR (Russian: Оле́г Евге́ньевич Ме́ньшиков; born 8 November 1960) is a Russian actor, theatre director and occasional singer. He is the current artistic director of the Yermolova Theatre in Moscow.

Internationally, Menshikov is the best known for his roles in the films by Nikita Mikhalkov Burnt by the Sun (1994), The Barber of Siberia (1998), Burnt by the Sun 2: Exodus (2010) and Burnt by the Sun 3: The Citadel (2011), as well as for his performance in Régis Wargnier's East/West (1999).

Menshikov is the winner of a Laurence Olivier Award, a Nika Award and three State Prizes of the Russian Federation, and the recipient of the Order of Honour of the Russian Federation.

== Early life ==
Menshikov was born in Serpukhov, Moscow Oblast, to father Evgeny (born 1934), a military engineer, and mother Yelena (born 1933), a doctor.

In addition to regular school, Menshikov also attended music school, where he played the piano and the violin. In 1977, he enrolled the Mikhail Shchepkin Higher Theatre School, where he studied acting under Vladimir Monakhov.

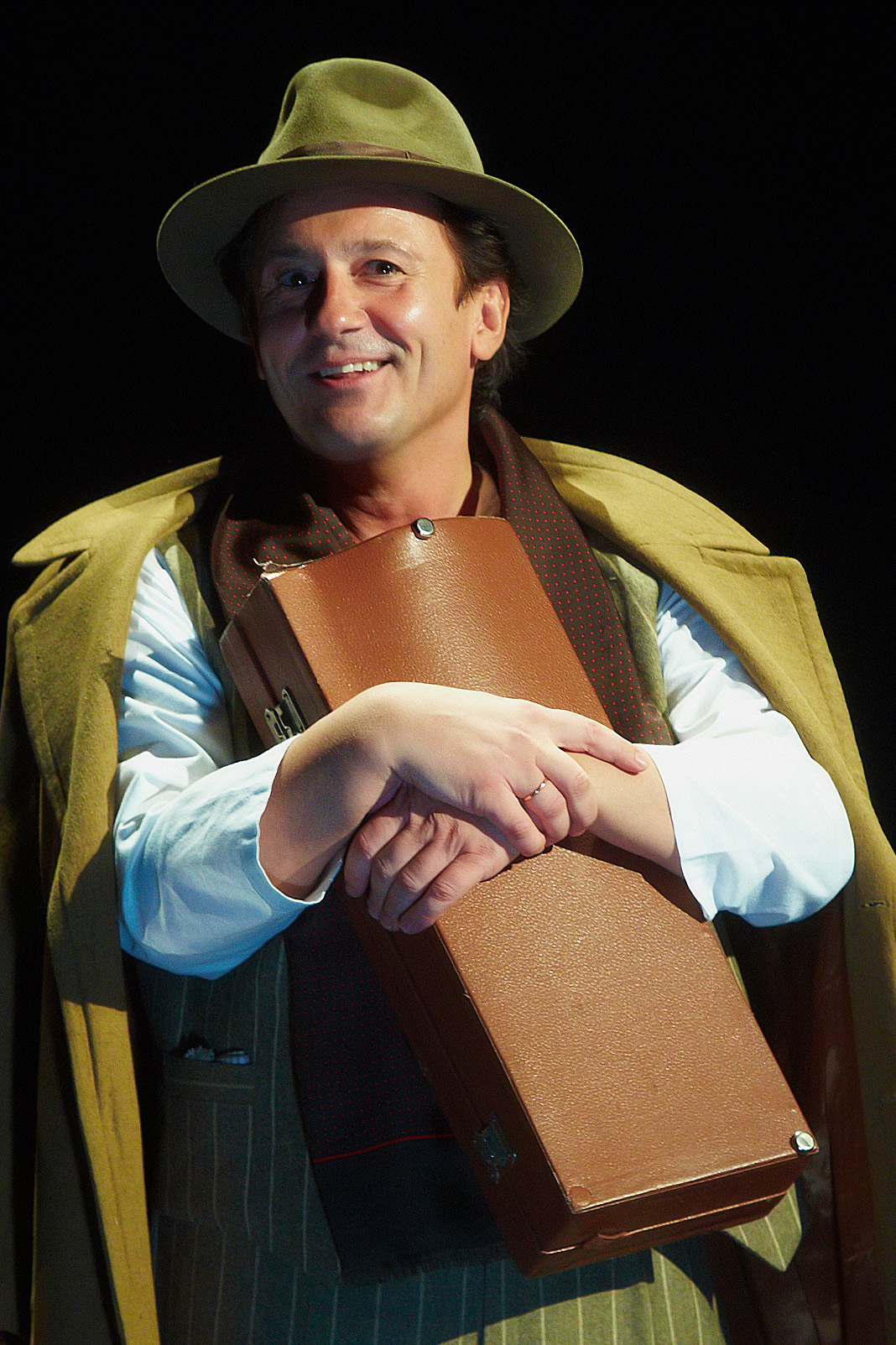
Oleg Menshikov in the play 1900, September 2010

== Career ==
Menshikov had his debut role in the 1980 television film Zhdu i nadeyus (Russian: Жду и надеюсь; English: I'm Waiting and Hoping) by Suren Shazbazyan. The next year he made his film debut in Family Relations, which was his first collaboration with Nikita Mikhalkov. Menshikov then went on to star a series of successful films that made him a star in the Soviet Union, including supporting roles in Flights in Dreams and Reality (1983), Through Main Street with an Orchestra (1986) and lead roles in My Favorite Clown (1986) Moonzund (1988) and The Stairway (1989). He garnered further critical acclaim for his performance in Dyuba-Dyuba (1992), for which he was nominated for a Nika Award.

Menshikov first attracted international media attention in the Globe Theatre production When She Danced, for which he won the 1992 Laurence Olivier Award for Best Actor in a Supporting Role. He gained further success with Nikita Mikhalkov's Burnt by the Sun, in which he portrayed a manipulative and suicidal NKVD agent during Joseph Stalin's Great Purge. Burnt by the Sun won the Grand Prize at the Cannes Film Festival and the Academy Award for Best Foreign Language Film. Menshikov reprised his role in the Burnt by the Sun sequels Burnt by the Sun 2: Exodus (2010) and Burnt by the Sun 2: Citadel (2011).

In 1996, Menshikov starred in Sergei Bodrov's Prisoner of the Mountains, for which he won a Nika Award for Best Actor. He went on to star in Mikhalkov's The Barber of Siberia (1998) opposite Julia Ormond, and in Régis Wargnier's East/West (1999) opposite Sandrine Bonnaire and Catherine Deneuve. His most recent credits include performances in the television series Prime Suspect 6 (2003), films The State Counsellor (2005) as Erast Fandorin and Legend № 17 (2013) as Anatoly Tarasov, and the miniseries Doctor Zhivago (2006).

In 1997, Menshikov was the president of the jury at the 20th Moscow International Film Festival. Since 2012, he has served as the artistic director of the Yermolova Theatre in Moscow.

Menshikov is a three-time winner of the annual State Prize of the Russian Federation for his outstanding contribution to film art. In 2003, he was named a People's Artist of Russia. Menshikov was presented with the Order of Honour in 2010.

== Personal life ==
In 2005, Menshikov married fellow actress Anastasia Chernova. He resides in Moscow.

== Filmography ==
Title in English	Original title	Year	Role	Notes
I Wait and Hope	Жду и надеюсь	1980	Shurka Domok	Television film
Family Relations	Родня	1981	Kirill	
The Pokrovsky Gate	Покровские ворота	1982	Konstantin Romin	
Flights in Dreams and Reality	Полёты во сне и наяву	1982	Alisa's friend	
The Kiss	Поцелуй	1983	Merzlyakov	Television film
Stripe of Obstacles	Полоса препятствий	1982	Vladimir Mezhirov	
Captain Fracasse	Капитан Фракасс	1984	Baron de Sigognac	Television miniseries
Volodya the Big and Volodya the Little	Володя большой, Володя маленький	1985	Vladimir Salimovich	Television film
Mikhailo Lomonosov	Михайло Ломоносов	1986	Dmitry Vinogradov	Television series
Moonzund	Моонзунд	1987	Sergei Artenyev	
My Favorite Clown	Мой любимый клоун	1986	Sergei Sinicyn	
Through Main Street with an Orchestra	По главной улице с оркестром	1987	Korolykov	
Splashes of Champagne	Брызги шампанского	1988	Sergei	
Life by Limit	Жизнь по лимиту	1988	Misha	
The Stairway	Лестница	1989	Vladimir Piroshnikov	
The Pit	Яма	1990	Vasiliy Likhonin	
Dyuba-Dyuba	Дюба-дюба	1992	Andrei Pletnyov	
Burnt by the Sun	Утомлённые солнцем	1994	Dmitry Arsentyev	
Prisoner of the Mountains	Кавказский пленник	1996	Sanya "Slai"	
The Barber of Siberia	Сибирский цирюльник	1998	Andrei Tolstoi / Andrew McCracken	
Mama	Мама	1999	Lyonchik	
East/West	Est – Ouest	1999	Aleksei Golovin	
Prime Suspect 6	—N/a	2003	Milan Lukic	Television series, 2 episodes
The State Counsellor	Статский советник	2005	Erast Fandorin	
The Little Golden Calf	Золотой телёнок	2006	Ostap Bender	Television miniseries
Doctor Zhivago	Доктор Живаго	2006	Yuri Zhivago	Television miniseries
Burnt by the Sun 2: Exodus	Утомлённые солнцем 2: Предстояние	2010	Dmitry Arsentyev	
What Men Talk About	О чём говорят мужчины	2010	himself	Cameo appearance
Burnt by the Sun 2	Утомлённые солнцем 2: Предстояние	2011	Dmitry Arsentyev	
Burnt by the Sun 2: The Citadel	Утомлённые солнцем 2: Цитадель	2011	Dmitry Arsentyev	Television series
Legend № 17	Легенда №17	2013	Anatoly Tarasov	
Attraction	Притяжение	2017	Valentin Lebedev, colonel	
Gogol. The Beginning	Гоголь. Начало	2017	Yakov Guro	
Gogol. Terrible Revenge	Гоголь. Страшная месть	2018	Yakov Guro	
Invasion	Вторжение	2020	general-major Valentin Lebedev	
Psycho	Псих	2020	Igor	

== Awards and nominations ==
Award	Year	Category	Nominated work	Result
Alexander Dovzhenko Award	1987	Silver Medal for Acting	Moonzund	Won
Golden Aries Award	1996	Outstanding Contribution to Film	—N/a	Won
Golden Eagle Award	2014	Best Supporting Actor	Legend № 17	Nominated
Golden Eagle Award	2023	Best Actor in an Online Series	Your Honor	Nominated
Kinotavr Film Festival Award	1996	Grand Prix	Prisoner of the Mountains	Won
Laurence Olivier Award	1992	Best Performance in a Supporting Role	When She Danced	Won
Moscow Seasons Theatre Festival	1990	Prize in Acting	Caligula	Won
Nika Award	1993	Best Actor	Dyuba-Dyuba	Nominated
Nika Award	1997	Best Actor	Prisoner of the Mountains	Won
Russian Film Critics' Award	1994	Actor of the Year	Burnt by the Sun	Won
Russian Guild of Film Critics Award	2014	Best Supporting Actor	Legend № 17	Nominated
State Prize of the Russian Federation	1995	Outstanding Contribution to Film Art	Burnt by the Sun	Won
State Prize of the Russian Federation	1997	Outstanding Contribution to Film Art	Prisoner of the Mountains	Won
State Prize of the Russian Federation	1999	Outstanding Contribution to Film Art	The Barber of Siberia	Won
Triumph Independent Film Award	1996	Outstanding Contribution to Culture	—N/a	Won
Victor Rozov Theatre Award	1993	Contribution to Theatre	N	Won

== Honours ==
- France: Ordre des Palmes Académiques (2003)
- Russia: People's Artist of Russia (2003)
- Russia: Order of Honour (2010)
- Russia: Lev Nikolaev Medal for Achievement in Art
