= Nadezhda Mikhalkova =

Russian actress (born 1986)

- Надежда Михалкова
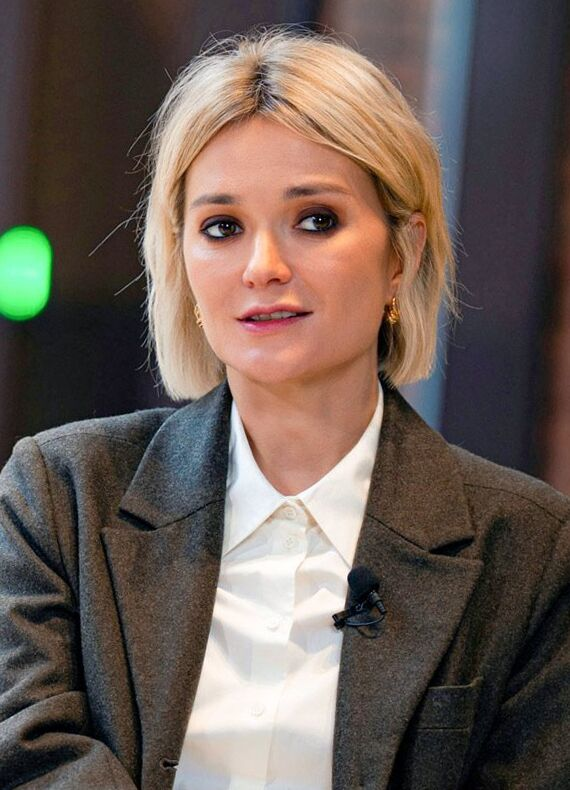
- Mikhalkova in 2025
- Born: Nadezhda Nikitichna Mikhalkova; September 27, 1986 (age 39); Moscow, Russian SFSR, Soviet Union
- Occupation: Actress
- Years active: 1992–present
- Spouse: Rezo Gigineishvili (m. 2010; div. 2017)
- Children: 2

Nadezhda Nikitichna Mikhalkova (Russian: Надежда Никитична Михалкова; born September 27, 1986) is a Russian film and voice actress.

== Early life and ancestry ==
Born into an old, noble Mikhalkov family, Nadezhda is the youngest daughter of actor and film director Nikita Mikhalkov and fashion designer Tatyana Shigaeva. Her brother Artyom and sister Anna are also actors.

== Career ==
Nadezhda, aged 6, starred as Nadya Kotova in the film Burnt by the Sun directed by her father, who also played Nadya's father in the film. The film received the Grand Prize at Cannes and the Academy Award for Best Foreign Language Film, among many other honours.

In 2008 role as Kseniya Asmolova in the TV series Univer (Russian TV series)

In 2010 role as Mariya in the TV series Interns (TV series)

Mikhalkova made an episodic appearance in the 1999 film The Barber of Siberia, also directed by Nikita Mikhalkov. In the 2000 film President and his Granddaughter, directed by Tigran Keosayan, Mikhalkova played twin sisters. In 2008 she graduated from the School of International Journalism in Moscow State Institute of International Relations. She reprised her role as Nadya Kotova, now a teenager, in the 2010 film Burnt by the Sun 2.

Mikhalkova was married to director and producer Rezo Gigineishvili. She gave birth to a daughter in Moscow on May 21, 2011. Her son was born 2 years to the day in 2013. In October 2017, the couple divorced after 7 years of marriage.

She appeared in the seventh season of ice show contest Ice Age.

== Filmography ==
Year	Film	Original Title	Role	Notes
1993	Anna: 6 - 18	Анна от 6 до 18	Nadya	Documentary, as herself
1994	Burnt by the Sun	Утомлённые солнцем	Nadya Kotova	Film debut
1998	The Barber of Siberia	Сибирский цирюльник	Girl at the Fair	Uncredited
1999	The President and His Granddaughter	Президент и его внучка	Masha and her twin	
2010	Burnt by the Sun 2: Exodus	Утомлённые солнцем 2: Предстояние	Nadya Kotova	
2011	Burnt by the Sun 3: The Citadel	Утомлённые солнцем 3: Цитадель	Nadya Kotova	
2019	Dead Lake	Мёртвое озеро	Natasha	
2021	Brighton 4th			
2024	Number one	Номер первый	Maria	
