= Without Witness =

1979 film

- Original German film poster
- Directed by: Nikita Mikhalkov
- Written by: Sofiya Prokofyeva; Nikita Mikhalkov
- Starring: Irina Kupchenko; Mikhail Ulyanov
- Cinematography: Pavel Lebeshev
- Edited by: Eleonora Praksina
- Music by: Eduard Artemyev
- Production company: Mosfilm
- Release date: July 1983
- Running time: 95 minutes
- Country: Soviet Union
- Language: Russian

Without Witness (Russian: Без свидетелей, translit. Bez svideteley) also known as Private Conversation is a 1983 Soviet drama film directed by Nikita Mikhalkov. It won the Prix FIPRESCI at the 13th Moscow International Film Festival.

== Plot ==
The film is staged in chamber style— throughout the film characters do not leave the apartment. The names of the main characters are unknown.

Coming one day to his former wife he finds out that she is going to marry his former friend Valentin Shlyakhov, a great scientist. The problem is that in his youth he once wrote an anonymous indictment which caused great harm to Valentin. He begins to realize that if they begin to live together then they will talk about the letter and his successful career will come to an end.

Out of fear of exposure he demands that she changes her mind. His main bargaining chip becomes their son Dima, who does not know that his mother is not related to him biologically. For the sake of her son's love and tranquility she is forced to sacrifice personal happiness.

== Cast ==
- Irina Kupchenko as She
- Mikhail Ulyanov as Him
- Eduard Artemyev (uncredited)
