= Moonzund =

- Directed by: Aleksandr Muratov
- Screenplay by: Galina Muratova; Eduard Volodarsky
- Based on: Moonzund by Valentin Pikul
- Starring: Oleg Menshikov; Vladimir Gostyukhin; Lyudmila Nilskaya; Nikolai Karachentsov; Yury Belyayev; Boris Klyuyev
- Cinematography: Konstantin Ryzhov
- Music by: Aleksandr Mikhailov
- Production company: Lenfilm
- Release date: 27 June 1988
- Running time: 142 minutes
- Country: Soviet Union
- Language: Russian

Moonzund (Russian: Моонзунд) is a 1988 Soviet war film based on Valentin Pikul's 1970 novel of the same name. "Moonzund" refers to the West Estonian archipelago, where the Battle of Moon Sound took place during World War I.

== Plot ==
Epic film set during the First World War brightly illustrates the struggles of Russian Empire in the years 1915–1917. The hardships of war cause major social and political unrest in the Tsarist Russia. Communist propaganda provokes conflicts between classes causing clashes and un-subordination aboard battleships of Russian Imperial Navy and on locations in Tallinn, Kronstadt and Saint Petersburg. Torn by internal class struggle, Russian Navy is weakened and loses major battles in the Baltic theater of war. Against this background, the commanding admirals of the Russian Navy are powerless witnesses of the tragic collapse of the fleet in terms of nascent revolutionary events of 1917. Most film characters are officers and sailors of the Baltic Fleet.

== Cast ==
- Oleg Menshikov as Captain Sergey Arten'ev
- Vladimir Gostyukhin as Semenchuk
- Lyudmila Nilskaya as spy Anna "Klara Georgievna" Revelskaya
- Nikolai Karachentsov as officer Von Knupfer
- Yury Belyayev as Admiral Kolchak
- Boris Klyuyev as Von Grapf
- Vija Artmane as Frau Milch
- Aleksei Buldakov as Portnyagin, sailor
- Vladimir Baranov as orderly Platov
- Yevgenia Dobrovolskaya as Irina Artenyeva
- Yevgeniy Yevstigneyev as Admiral Nikolai Essen
- Sergei Garmash as Pavel Dybenko
- Vladimir Yeryomin as Leonid Deichman, Mechanical Engineer
- Vladimir Golovin as von Den
- Petr Shelokhonov as Captain Andreev
- Victor Kostetskiy as commander of the cruiser "Rurik"
