= Burnt by the Sun 3: The Citadel =

- Film poster
- Directed by: Nikita Mikhalkov
- Written by: Nikita Mikhalkov
- Produced by: Nikita Mikhalkov
- Starring: Nikita Mikhalkov; Oleg Menshikov
- Cinematography: Vladislav Opelyants
- Edited by: Svetolik Zajc
- Music by: Eduard Artemyev
- Production company: Three T Productions
- Distributed by: Central Partnership
- Release date: 22 April 2011
- Running time: 157 minutes
- Country: Russia
- Language: Russian
- Budget: $45 million
- Box office: $8.2 million

Burnt by the Sun 3: The Citadel (Russian: Утомлённые солнцем 3: Цитадель, translit. Utomlyonnye solntsem 3: Citadel) is a 2011 Russian drama film directed, written, produced and starring by Nikita Mikhalkov, released on May 5, 2011. It is a sequel to the films Burnt by the Sun (1994) and Burnt by the Sun 2: Exodus (2010). Burnt by the Sun 3: The Citadel, like a predecessor, had the largest production budget ever seen in Russian cinema ($45 mln), but it turned out to be Russia's biggest box office flop, and received negative reviews from critics both in Russia and abroad. The film was selected as the Russian entry for the Best Foreign Language Film at the 84th Academy Awards, but it was not nominated.

== Plot ==
In 1943, during the height of the Great Patriotic War, NKGB Colonel Dmitry "Mitya" Arsentiev finds ex-Komdiv (General) Kotov among the ranks of a penal battalion, standing at the walls of an impregnable fortress ("the Citadel"), which resembles a huge medieval castle with numerous convenient firing positions. The Germans, who are holed up inside, are able to stop all attempts by the Soviet army to advance. Drunken General Melezhko orders the penal soldiers to attack the Citadel, despite knowing that it means certain death for them. Before the start of the attack, noticing Mitya in the trench, and not wanting to meet him, Kotov raises the penal soldiers to attack without waiting for orders. Mitya is forced to follow, under heavy enemy fire, as he is not allowed to return to the trench due to the barrier troops firing on the penal soldiers from behind.

Having met on the battlefield and successfully hiding on its outskirts, Mitya and Kotov remained unharmed. After the fight, taking Kotov to the rear, Mitya tells him that he had replaced his "political" article with a "criminal" one in 1941, adding that Maroussia is actually alive and aware of Kotov's testimony against her (which came as a shock to Kotov, as he was absolutely sure that Maroussia had also been shot before the war). After that, Mitya gives Kotov a gun. However, contrary to Mitya's expectations, Kotov does not kill him. Instead, he angrily fires all the cartridges into the air and tries to escape. Later, Mitya informs Kotov that he has been rehabilitated and awarded the rank of lieutenant general. Mitya gives Kotov the brief case that was given to him by Stalin himself at the Kuntsevo Dacha. Kotov finds general's shoulder insignia and three medals of the Order of the Red Banner inside.

Nadya, who has been shell-shocked, continues to serve in the medical unit. During the evacuation of the hospital, a truck carrying the wounded soldiers and a pregnant woman Nyura, driven by Nadya, came under fire from German planes. Despite a bomb falling two yards from the truck, which has stopped in the middle of a field, the truck and its passengers remain undamaged. After the bombing ended, the wounded soldiers delivered Nyura and named the baby, whose father turned out to be a German who had raped Nyura, Joseph Vissarionovich in Stalin's honor.

Mitya and Kotov arrive at the dacha (country estate), where the Komdiv and his family lived. However, Kotov is not expected at home, as it is believed that he was shot a long time ago. Maroussia and Kirik are raising a child together, and all the photos related to Kotov and Nadya, who is believed to be dead after the 1941 barge accident in the Baltic Sea, have been put away. With his arrival, Kotov disrupts the peace of the household. After discovering the child, named Sergei after him, Kotov is shocked by the situation and reprimands the family for living comfortably while he was in Gulag and fighting in the penal battalion. Maroussia has a tantrum. Kotov also tells Maroussia about how he was beaten in the NKVD torture chamber during the interrogation. The frightened family decides to leave the next day secretly, leaving only the elderly members at home. Kotov manages to catch the family at the train station, where Kirik begs him to let Maroussia and their son to leave. However, Kotov lets Kirik to leave with them after Maroussia's pleading.

Stalin calls Kotov to his residence and orders him to lead 15,000 civilians on a difficult and dangerous attack against the Citadel. The plan is to use them as bait to deplete the enemy's ammunition, allowing for a later successful attack with fewer casualties. If successful, Kotov will be given an army under his command.

Meanwhile, Mitya has been arrested and accused of espionage and planning an assassination on Stalin. He is relieved that his wish for death has come true and signs all the documents confirming his death sentence during the first interrogation.

Civilians arriving at the trenches are given shovel handles instead of rifles. Kotov must order an offensive, but he descends into the trench himself and, taking the lead, slowly heads towards the Citadel with a shovel handle. The officers follow him, and everyone else follows the officers. A German machine gunner aims at the garmon player among civilians, but, due to his careless, he is shot by a Soviet sniper. The falling body of the machine gunner, who left his notes and glasses on the table, accidentally causes a fire in the Citadel, which causes an explosion. Nadya, who serves in a nearby located medical unit, notices her father through binoculars and runs to him, but she steps on a mine in a minefield. Kotov places his foot on Nadia's and orders her to remove her foot from her boot and move 20 steps away.

Kotov survives. In the final scene of the film, the Kotov, with the medal of a Hero of the Soviet Union on his tunic, and Nadia, who has regained her voice, ride on a tank at the lead of a column of Soviet tanks heading for Berlin.

== Cast ==
- Nikita Mikhalkov as Lieutenant general Sergei Petrovich Kotov
- Oleg Menshikov as NKGB Colonel Dimitri "Mitya" Arsentyev
- Nadezhda Mikhalkova as Nadya, Kotov's daughter
- Viktoriya Tolstoganova as Maroussia, Kotov's ex-wife
- Vladimir Ilyin as Kirik, Maroussia's current husband
- Sergei Makovetsky as SMERSH Major Lunin
- Andrey Merzlikin as Nikolay, ex-Major of the tank forces fighting in the penal battalion
- Artur Smolyaninov as Yurok, the penalized soldier
- Dmitri Dyuzhev as Ivan, Kotov's Belarusian cellmate
- Maksim Sukhanov as Joseph Stalin
- Evelina Sakuro as Olga Nikolayevna, Maroussia's mother
- Alla Kazanskaya as Lidiya Stepanovna, Maroussia's grandmother
- Nina Arkhipova as Yelena Mikhailovna, Kirik's mother
- Vladlen Davydov as Vsevolod Konstantinovich, Professor of Roman law and Maroussia's uncle
- Zoya Buryak as Katya Mokhova, Kotov's housekeeper
- Roman Madyanov as General Melezhko
- Sergey Bachursky as Ryabov, the NKGB officer
- Inna Churikova as the old woman
- Anna Mikhalkova as Nyura, the pregnant peasant woman
- Charly Hübner as Gustav Lemke, the German machine gunner
- Pavel Derevyanko as the legless groom soldier
- Sergey Stepanchenko as the truck driver

== Reception ==
In September 2011, the Russian Film Committee selected Burnt by the Sun 3: Citadel as the Russian nominee for the Academy Award for Best Foreign Language Film. This move was followed with protests and disagreement from many filmmakers, including another Academy Awards recipient Vladimir Menshov and Mikhalkov's brother, director Andrey Konchalovsky. The film was not included in the Oscars short list.

== See also ==
- List of submissions to the 84th Academy Awards for Best Foreign Language Film
- List of Russian submissions for the Academy Award for Best Foreign Language Film
