= Family Relations =

- Directed by: Nikita Mikhalkov
- Written by: Viktor Merezhko
- Starring: Nonna Mordyukova; Svetlana Kryuchkova; Yuri Bogatyryov
- Cinematography: Pavel Lebeshev
- Music by: Eduard Artemyev
- Release date: 1981
- Running time: 98 minutes
- Country: Soviet Union
- Language: Russian

Family Relations (Russian: Родня, romanized: Rodnya) is a 1981 Soviet comedy-drama film directed by Nikita Mikhalkov.

== Plot ==
A rural woman, Mariya Konovalova (Nonna Mordyukova) travels to the regional center to visit her daughter Nina (Svetlana Kryuchkova), and her beloved granddaughter Irishka (Fedor Stukov). This good-natured and simple-minded woman cannot imagine the world they are living in - the dearest and perhaps the only people close to her. In her attempts to understand their views on life and improve her daughter’s strained relationship with her ex-husband, she inadvertently brings them all a great deal of grief.

== Cast ==
- Nonna Mordyukova as Maria Konovalova
- Svetlana Kryuchkova as Nina, Maria's daughter
- Yuri Bogatyryov as Tasik, Nina's husband
- Andrei Petrov as Liapin, Maria's fellow traveler
- Fyodor Stukov as Irishka, Nina's daughter
- Ivan Bortnik as Vovchik, Maria's ex-husband
- Oleg Menshikov as Kirill, Vovchik's son
- Vsevolod Larionov as Lieutenant-General in the train
- Nikita Mikhalkov as waiter
- Aleksandr Adabashyan as Sanya the Waiter / man with glass at the train station
- Sergey Gazarov as Kirill's guest

== Production ==
The main part of the film was shot in Dnepropetrovsk, nowadays - Dnipro, Ukraine, scenes in the restaurant — in Pushchino (Moscow Oblast), runner — at the Olimpiyskiy National Sports Complex in Kyiv.
