= Vilen Kalyuta =

Ukrainian cinematographer

Merited Arts Functionary Vilen Kalyuta
- Вілен Калюта
- Born: 22 October 1930; Huliaipole, Ukrainian SSR, Soviet Union
- Died: 3 November 1999 (aged 69); Kyiv, Ukraine
- Education: National Aviation University
- Occupation: Cinematographer
- Notable work: The Legend of Princess Olga; Urga; Burnt by the Sun; As cameraman: Farewell, Doves; St John's Eve
- Awards: Shevchenko National Prize

Vilen Aleksandrovich Kalyuta (Ukrainian: Вілен Олександрович Калюта; 22 October 1930 – 3 November 1999) was a Ukrainian cinematographer. He was the laureate of the Shevchenko National Prize in 1999.

He was born on 22 October 1930, in Huliaipole, in Zaporizhzhia Oblast. Kalyuta worked on more than 50 movies during his 40-year career. Notable films by Vilen Kalyuta are White Bird with Black Mark, Flights in Dreams and Reality, The Legend of Princess Olga, Urga, Burnt by the Sun and the last film he worked on A Friend of the Deceased. Vilen Kalyuta died on 3 November 1999 in Kyiv.
