= Burnt by the Sun 2 =

2010 film

Burnt by the Sun 2: Exodus
- Film poster
- Directed by: Nikita Mikhalkov
- Written by: Nikita Mikhalkov; Vladimir Moiseenko; Aleksandr Novototsky-Vlasov; Gleb Panfilov
- Produced by: Nikita Mikhalkov; Leonid Vereshchagin; Aleksey Balashov; Sergei Gurevich; Aleksey Karpushin; Aleksandr Utkin; Yekaterina Yakovleva
- Starring: Nikita Mikhalkov; Oleg Menshikov
- Cinematography: Vladislav Opelyants
- Edited by: Svetolik Zajc
- Music by: Eduard Artemyev
- Production company: Three T Productions
- Distributed by: Central Partnership
- Release date: 22 April 2010
- Running time: 181 minutes
- Country: Russia
- Language: Russian
- Budget: $40 million
- Box office: $8.2 million

Burnt by the Sun 2: Exodus (Russian: Утомлённые солнцем 2: Предстояние, translit. Utomlyonnye solntsem 2: Predstoyanie, also known as Burnt by the Sun 2: Prestanding or just Burnt by the Sun 2) is a 2010 Russian drama film directed, written, produced by and starring Nikita Mikhalkov, released on 22 April 2010. It is the sequel to Mikhalkov's 1994 film Burnt by the Sun, set in the Eastern Front of World War II. Burnt by the Sun 2: Exodus had the largest production budget ever seen in Russian cinema ($40 mln), but it turned out to be Russia's biggest box office flop, and received negative reviews from critics both in Russia and abroad.

The sequel, Burnt by the Sun 3: The Citadel, released on May 5, 2011.

== Plot ==
=== Exodus ===
The film begins in June 1941. Five years have passed since the lives and destinies of Komdiv (General) Sergei Petrovich Kotov, his wife Maroussia, their daughter Nadia, as well as those of Mitya and the Sverbitski family, were irrevocably changed: it has meant five years of incarceration for General Kotov, the former Revolutionary hero betrayed by Stalin. He escapes certain death in the Gulag and fights on the Eastern Front as a private.

It has been five years of terror for his wife Maroussia, without the husband she believes is dead and with a daughter who has rejected her. Nadia has spent five years in hiding, proud of her father whom she refuses to disown and whom she believes is alive, despite all reports to the contrary.

Mitya survived his suicide attempt, and reluctantly continues to execute the orders of a regime he holds in contempt. Stalin, with his nation under attack by former ally Adolf Hitler, recalls many of those whom he has had exiled to the GULAG. He tries to mobilize the Soviet population – by any means necessary – to rise against the threat of Nazism.

=== Citadel ===
Kotov is now fighting at the front. Nadia, who has survived an attempted rape by German soldiers, is now a nurse risking her own life to save others.

== Cast ==
- Nikita Mikhalkov as ex-Komdiv Sergei Petrovich Kotov
- Oleg Menshikov as NKVD Colonel Dimitri "Mitya" Arsentyev
- Nadezhda Mikhalkova as Nadya, Kotov's daughter
- Viktoriya Tolstoganova as Maroussia, Kotov's ex-wife
- Sergey Bachursky as Ryabov, the NKVD officer
- Dmitri Dyuzhev as Ivan, Kotov's Belarusian cellmate
- Sergei Makovetsky as SMERSH Captain Lunin
- Andrey Merzlikin as Nikolay, ex-Major of the tank forces fighting in the penal battalion
- Andrei Panin as Pioneer counselor Kravets
- Aleksandr Pashutin as the camp commander
- Valeri Zolotukhin as Michman Pindyurin, commander of the barge
- Sergei Garmash as Father Alexander
- Aleksandr Adabashyan as apparatchik Igor
- Maria Shukshina as Zinaida Vasilyevna, Igor's wife
- Aleksei Petrenko as elderly lieutenant-accountant
- Artur Smolyaninov as Yurok, the penalized soldier
- Yevgeny Stychkin as the ex-senior lieutenant, a sapper fighting in the penal battalion
- Natalya Surkova as Katya, a rural girl raped by the German soldiers
- Maksim Sukhanov as Joseph Stalin
- Adam Bulgachyov as Lavrenty Beriya
- Alexey Buldakov as Semyon Budyonny
- Aleksandr Mokhov as Klim Voroshilov
- Sergey Burunov as the prisoner
- Valentin Gaft as Pimen, the Jewish prisoner
- Rimma Markova as Ilyinichna, the nurse
- Aleksandr Golubev as Captain Lysyakov, commander of the Kremlin cadets
- Yevgeny Mironov as Senior lieutenant Izyumov, commander of the penal battalion
- Daniil Spivakovsky as the commander of the crossing
- Igor Shmakov as cadet Gosha
- Karel Dobrý as the Luftwaffe pilot

== Reception ==
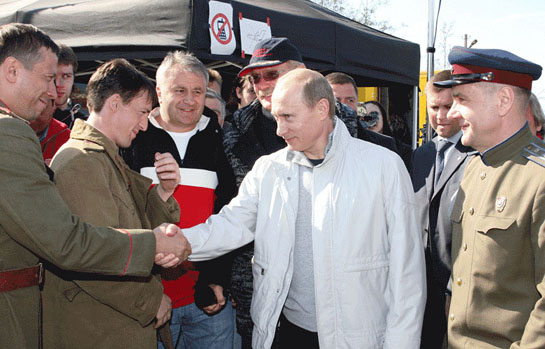
Russian Prime Minister Vladimir Putin on a visit to the movie set in Leningrad Oblast on 13 May 2008 (see the video below).

Video of this visit by Vladimir Putin to the set in 2008.

The film received mostly negative reviews from both Russian and western critics. It was panned for historical inaccuracies, retconning, bad acting and other failures. It was criticized for abruptly breaking with the continuity of the first film, including mysteriously resurrecting characters presumed dead and changing their ages. For example, according to the first film, Nadia would have been 11 in 1941, but she is portrayed as an adult.

Critics panned many provocative episodes, such as a German pilot defecating on a Soviet ship, or Kotov's dipping Stalin into a cake. The Russian media reviews were especially hostile to the film, because of its revisionist portrayal of Soviet army and Soviet leaders. As web publicist Dmitry Puchkov noted, "like any other nation, Russians don't want to see their fathers portrayed as shit." Western critics were mostly negative as well. However, the Hollywood Reporter's Kirk Honeycutt felt that, while Russian critics attacked the film for "sticking too closely to the Kremlin's approved version of World War II and for its promotion of Orthodox Christianity," it was a "much, much better film than its Russian reviews indicate." He likened its portrayal of the madness of World War II to the American Joseph Heller's Catch-22. According to the critic Oleg Zolotarev, "The reasons it has flopped are psychological [not artistic]. Mikhalkov is no longer seen as a director but as a state bureaucrat."

Burnt by the Sun 2: Prestanding had the highest-ever budget for a Russian film ($55 million) but made a very poor box-office showing, despite heavy promotion that included a premiere inside the Moscow Kremlin.

The film was screened at the 2010 Cannes Film Festival and was allowed to compete for awards, although it had premiered before the festival. At Cannes it received a standing ovation, but no awards.

The Russian opposition activist Valeria Novodvorskaya said that despite her complete disagreement with the political views of Mikhalkov (who expresses support towards Putin) and despite the film's being "artistically ungifted", she believed it is a good depiction of the first stages of the war against Germany. According to her, it shows how badly the Red Army was prepared for war because of Stalin's poor strategic skills.
