= Burnt by the Sun =

- Film poster
- Directed by: Nikita Mikhalkov
- Written by: Rustam Ibragimbekov; Nikita Mikhalkov
- Produced by: Leonid Vereshchagin; Armand Barbault; Nikita Mikhalkov; Michel Seydoux
- Starring: Oleg Menshikov; Nikita Mikhalkov; Ingeborga Dapkūnaitė; Nadezhda Mikhalkova
- Cinematography: Vilen Kalyuta
- Edited by: Enzo Meniconi
- Music by: Eduard Artemyev
- Distributed by: Sony Pictures Classics
- Release dates: 21 May 1994 (Cannes Film Festival); 2 November 1994 (Russia)
- Running time: 135 minutes
- Countries: Russia; France
- Language: Russian
- Budget: $3.6 million
- Box office: $2.3 million (US)

Burnt by the Sun (Russian: Утомлённые солнцем, romanized: Utomlyonnye solntsem, lit. 'wearied by the sun') is a 1994 Russian drama film starring, directed, written, and produced by Nikita Mikhalkov and co-written by Azerbaijani screenwriter Rustam Ibragimbekov. The film depicts the story of a senior Red Army officer, played by Mikhalkov, and his family during the Great Purge of the late 1930s in the Stalinist Soviet Union. While on vacation with his wife, young daughter, and assorted friends and family, things change dramatically for KomDiv Kotov when his wife's old lover, Dmitri, shows up after being away for many years. The film also stars Oleg Menshikov, Ingeborga Dapkūnaitė and Mikhalkov's daughter Nadezhda Mikhalkova.

Burnt by the Sun was popular in Russia and received positive reviews in the United States. It won the Grand Prix at the 1994 Cannes Film Festival, the Academy Award for Best Foreign Language Film and other honours.

Burnt by the Sun is one of only four Russian films to have won the Academy Award for Best Foreign Language Film. The other three are War and Peace (1966–1967), Dersu Uzala (1975), and Moscow Does Not Believe in Tears (1980).

== Plot ==
The entirety of the film takes place within the course of one day in the summer of 1936 in the Soviet Union. Mitya (Dmitri), a former nobleman and veteran of the anti-communist White Army, contemplates suicide. The film cuts to Komdiv Sergei Petrovich Kotov, his wife Maroussia, and their young six-year-old daughter Nadia relaxing in a banya (sauna) when a peasant from the local collective farm frantically tells them the Red Army's tanks are about to crush the wheat harvest as part of general maneuvers. After hearing this news, Kotov rides out to order the tank officer to halt. Kotov carries authority as a senior Old Bolshevik and legendary hero of the Russian Civil War, and he is also very popular with the common people and local villagers. The opening scene makes it clear that Kotov is a devoted family man, and he claims to be a personal friend of Stalin.

Following this incident, the happy family returns to their country dacha (country estate), where they join Maroussia's relatives, a large and eccentric family of Chekhovian aristocrats. Mitya (Dmitri), who had been Maroussia's fiancé before disappearing in 1927, arrives in a costume to disguise himself, but when he takes it off he is joyfully embraced by the family and introduced to Nadia as "Uncle Mitya". Maroussia is left feeling deeply conflicted, as she had suffered deeply when Mitya left without explanation and even contemplated suicide, as shown by the self-inflicted marks on her wrists.

Despite his personable nature, it is clear that Mitya has returned with a secret agenda. It is slowly revealed throughout the duration of the afternoon that he works for the Soviet political police, the NKVD, and has arrived to arrest Kotov for a non-existent conspiracy that Mitya had framed him for. Mitya is abusing his power for the purpose of revenge, since ten years ago Kotov had conscripted Mitya into the OGPU, the predecessor of the NKVD, and was therefore the reason for Mitya being taken away. Mitya detests Kotov, whom he blames for causing him to lose Maroussia, his love for Russia, faith, and his profession as a pianist. Kotov confronts Mitya about his activities in Paris, where he gave up eight White Army generals to the NKVD. All were kidnapped, smuggled to the Soviet Union, and shot dead without trial.

Although eventually realizing that Mitya intends to take him away, Kotov believes that his close relationship with Soviet dictator Joseph Stalin will save him. However, a black car carrying NKVD agents arrives to remove Kotov, just as a group of Young Pioneer children arrives at the dacha to pay tribute to him. Kotov willingly goes with Mitya, pretending to be Mitya's friend and even lets Nadia briefly ride in the car with them. While riding away in the car with his captors, Kotov reminds them who he is and his status, but he quickly realizes that they don't care and that it was Stalin himself who ordered his arrest. Only after looking into Mitya's eyes does Kotov realize the severity of the situation, causing him to breakdown in tears. Kotov is forced to make a false confession to all the charges Mitya framed him for and is shot dead in August 1936. Meanwhile, following Mitya's success in his revenge against Kotov, he ultimately commits suicide, as his revenge did not satisfy him in the way he thought it would. In addition, Maroussia is arrested and dies in the Gulag in 1940. Although arrested with her mother and taken to a concentration camp, Nadia lives to see all three sentences overturned during the Khrushchev Thaw, in 1956, and works as a music teacher in Kazakhstan.

== Cast ==
- Oleg Menshikov as Dimitri Arsentyev (Mitya), NKVD man
- Nikita Mikhalkov as Komdiv Sergei Petrovich Kotov
- Ingeborga Dapkūnaitė as Maroussia, Kotov's wife
- Nadezhda Mikhalkova as Nadia, Kotov's daughter
- André Oumansky as Philippe, Mitya's valet
- Vyacheslav Tikhonov as Vsevolod, Maroussia's uncle
- Svetlana Kryuchkova as Mokhova, Kotov's housekeeper
- Vladimir Ilyin as Kirik, Yelena Mikhailovna's son
- Alla Kazanskaya as Lidiya Stepanovna, Maroussia's grandmother
- Nina Arkhipova as Yelena Mikhailovna, Lidiya Stepanovna's friend
- Avangard Leontiev as driver
- Inna Ulyanova as Olga Nikolayevna, Maroussia's mother
- Lyubov Rudneva as Lyuba, Vsevolod's student
- Vladimir Ryabov as NKVD officer
- Vladimir Belousov as NKVD man
- Aleksey Pokatilov as NKVD man
- Yevgeny Mironov as Lieutenant
- Marat Basharov as tank crewman
- Tamara Akopova
- Natela Abuladze
- Yury Aksenty

== Production ==
=== Background ===
The Russian Civil War of 1917 was a multi-party civil war in the Russian Empire that followed the two Russian revolutions of 1917. It lasted until 1922 and transformed the lives of many Russians. The Red Army was led by Vladimir Lenin, but after he died in 1924, Stalin was able to establish his position as the ruler of the Soviet regime. Throughout the 1930s, Stalin launched a campaign of political terror that is now known as the Great Purge. During this time people were regularly rounded up and killed as traitors without a trial.

=== Conception ===
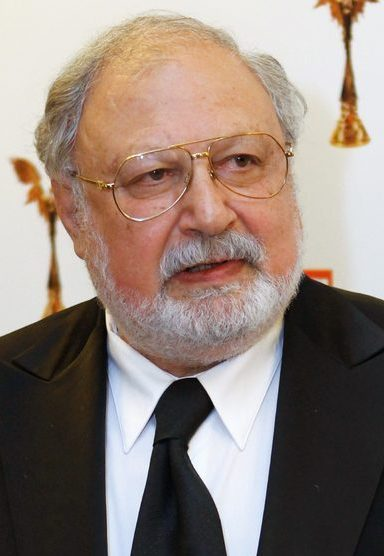
Screenwriter Rustam Ibragimbekov said the film represented a statement on totalitarianism, and the sun in the film represents Joseph Stalin.

Nikita Mikhalkov stated in making the film, his belief was that "Bolshevism did not bring happiness to our country". However, he doubted whether "entire generations" could be judged for actions caused by wider social problems. Mikhalkov also took inspiration from his young daughter Nadezhda Mikhalkova, and memories of his home. Azerbaijani screenwriter Rustam Ibragimbekov created the storyline with Mikhalkov and collaborated with him on the dialogue.

The title derives from a popular 1930s song composed by Jerzy Petersburski. Originally the Polish tango, "To ostatnia niedziela" ("This is the last Sunday"), it became popular in the Soviet Union with new Russian lyrics and the title, "Утомлённое солнце" (Utomlyonnoye solntse, "Wearied Sun"). The song is heard repeatedly in the film; the director Mikhalkov said in 2007 that he learned of the song from his elder brother Andrei Konchalovsky's 1979 film Siberiade. He compared his use of the music to his having stolen money as a boy from his brother. According to Ibragimbekov, the "sun" depicted in the film is intended to symbolize Stalin, and emphasized a point of the film is that totalitarian regimes "take on a life of their own, destroying not only those whom they were originally intended to destroy but their creators as well".

=== Filming ===
The film was shot in Moscow while Nikolina Gora was used for the village, and the scenes set inside the dacha were filmed in Nizhny Novgorod. It had a budget of $3.6 million, with major sponsorship from Goskino. The cinematography on the project was done by Vilen Kalyuta, a Ukrainian cinematographer. For the part of Kotov's daughter Nadia, Mikhalkov cast his daughter Nadezhda, who hoped her compensation would be a bicycle. Mikhalkov opted to play Kotov himself because he believed it would make his daughter comfortable, explaining "certain scenes [were] especially delicate on an emotional level".

The scenes were filmed between July and November 1993. Mikhalkov decided on a fast shooting schedule out of consideration for Nadezhda, who was six at the time. He remarked that "Children grow quickly and lose the tenderness, the simplicity, and the charm their youth carries".

== Themes ==
Throughout the film, a fireball appears and sets off fires wherever it goes. This fireball is a burning sun that represents Stalin's purges that come out of nowhere and destroy the most undeserving. Kotov is under the impression that he can see clearly and can avoid the excesses of the Soviet's harmful rays. He enjoys the warmth of his family and his status as a war hero but he eventually realizes that he too has been blinded by this to his peril and cannot avoid death; Mitya is the burning sun that strikes Kotov. Kotov draws the viewer's sympathy and is portrayed in a positive light.

== Release ==
The film premiered at the Cannes Film Festival in May 1994. Although it won the Cannes Grand Prix, Mikhalkov was said to be bitterly disappointed with not securing the Palme d'Or, with Russian press declaring "defeat". For marketing within Russia, Mikhalkov personally toured local places and encouraged politicians and businesses to screen his film. It opened in Moscow on 2 November 1994.

It later had a video release in Russia, where it topped sales for 48 consecutive weeks, demonstrating great popularity. The film was aired on Russian television on the evening before the 1996 Russian presidential election, in a possible attempt to discredit Gennady Zyuganov's Communist Party.

== Reception ==
=== Critical reception ===
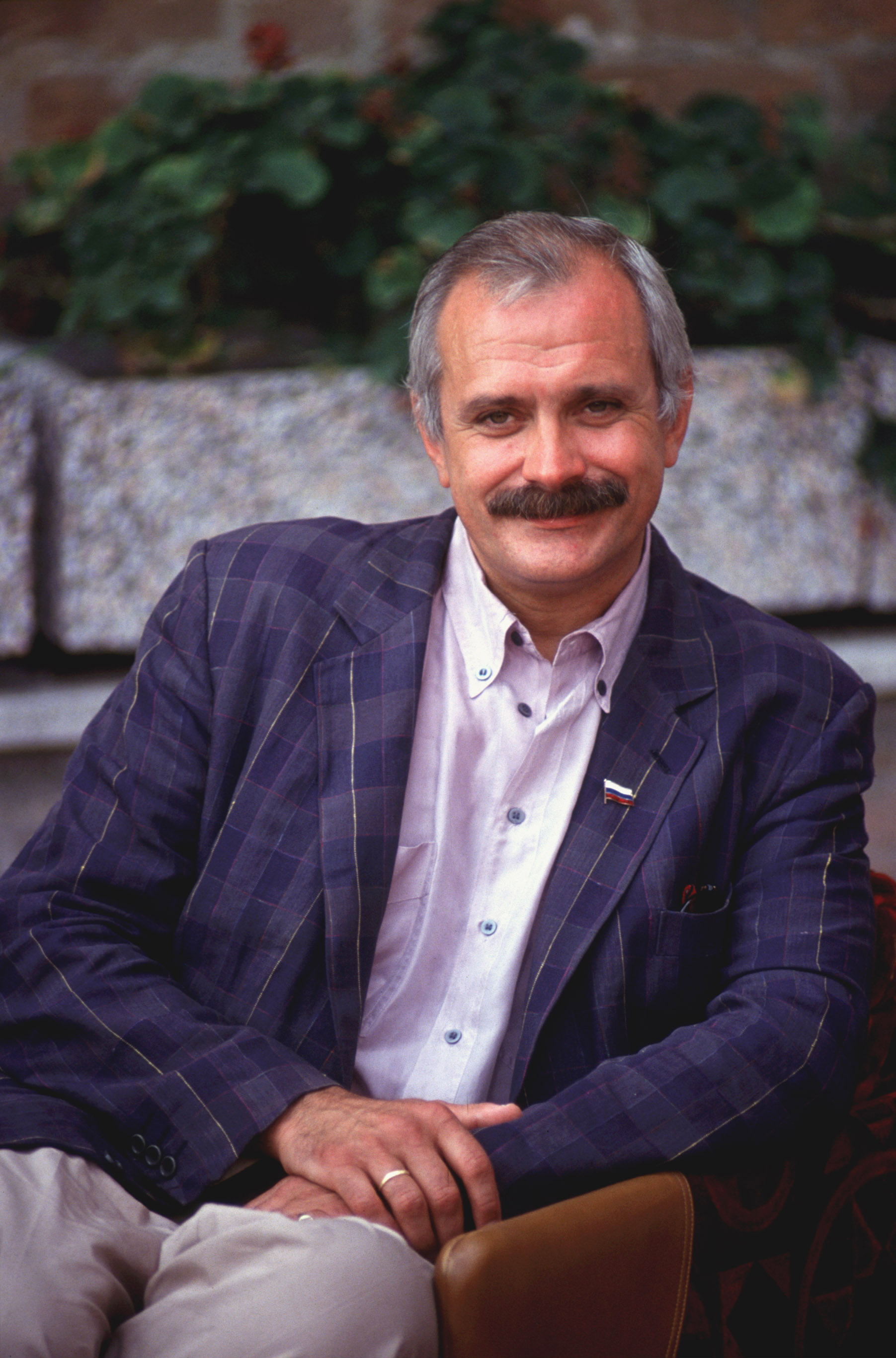
Critics praised Nikita Mikhalkov's performance and his chemistry with daughter Nadezhda Mikhalkova.

In its native Russia, initial reviews were "largely neutral". Common criticisms in Russia were that the film was "too commercial", and lacked seriousness. Marc Savlov of Austin Chronicle wrote "A brilliant, Chekhovian meditation on trust, love, and the intrusive horrors that period of time brought to otherwise normal families". Roger Ebert gave the film two stars, judging it to be derivative of "many pre-1991 Eastern bloc epics". Caryn James described the film in The New York Times as "exquisite, lyrical and tough-minded". Kenneth Turan of the Los Angeles Times wrote "What Burnt by the Sun does best is elegantly intertwine the personal and political themes of love, trust and betrayal". David Denby, writing for New York magazine, said that while he initially found the film had "too much sunshine", concluded "Burnt by the Sun is an extremely powerful work". Desson Howe of The Washington Post called the film "old-fashioned, auteurist filmmaking" with "mostly pluses", adding "The Mikhalkovs work together like Astaire and Rogers". Entertainment Weekly's Owen Gleiberman gave the film a B+, writing "Burnt by the Sun builds slowly, reaching a climax of quiet devastation", and said the rowboat scene is "so tender I don't think I'll ever forget it".

The Time Out review states Mikhalkov's "performance is impeccable, and the scenes with his daughter Nadia achieve a rare poignancy". In his 2015 Movie Guide, Leonard Maltin gave the film three stars and called it a "Provocative, moving meditation" on Stalinism. The film has an 81% approval rating on Rotten Tomatoes, based on 16 reviews, and average rating 7.1/10.

=== Accolades ===
The film received the Grand Prix at the 1994 Cannes Film Festival, and the Academy Award for Best Foreign Language Film. The Academy Award was voted on by attendees of the academy preview screening, since Burnt by the Sun was not in theatres in the U.S. at the time, and only attendees had seen all five nominated films. Roger Ebert criticized the award as the result of "the Academy's flawed rules", alleging "A publicist merely has to be sure to invite everyone friendly to the film, while leaving it up to others to find their own way". Both Nikita and Nadezhda Mikhalkov went on stage to accept the Academy Award.

Award	Date of ceremony	Category	Recipient(s)	Result	Ref(s)
Academy Awards	27 March 1995	Best Foreign Language Film	Nikita Mikhalkov	Won	
Australian Film Institute Awards	1996	Best Foreign Film	Nikita Mikhalkov and Michel Seydoux	Nominated	
BAFTA Awards	23 April 1996	Film Not in the English Language	Nikita Mikhalkov and Michel Seydoux	Nominated	
Cannes Film Festival	12 – 23 May 1994	Grand Prix	Nikita Mikhalkov	Won	
Cannes Film Festival	12 – 23 May 1994	Prize of the Ecumenical Jury	Nikita Mikhalkov	Won	
State Prize of the Russian Federation	1994	State Prize of the Russian Federation	Nikita Mikhalkov	Won	

== Legacy ==
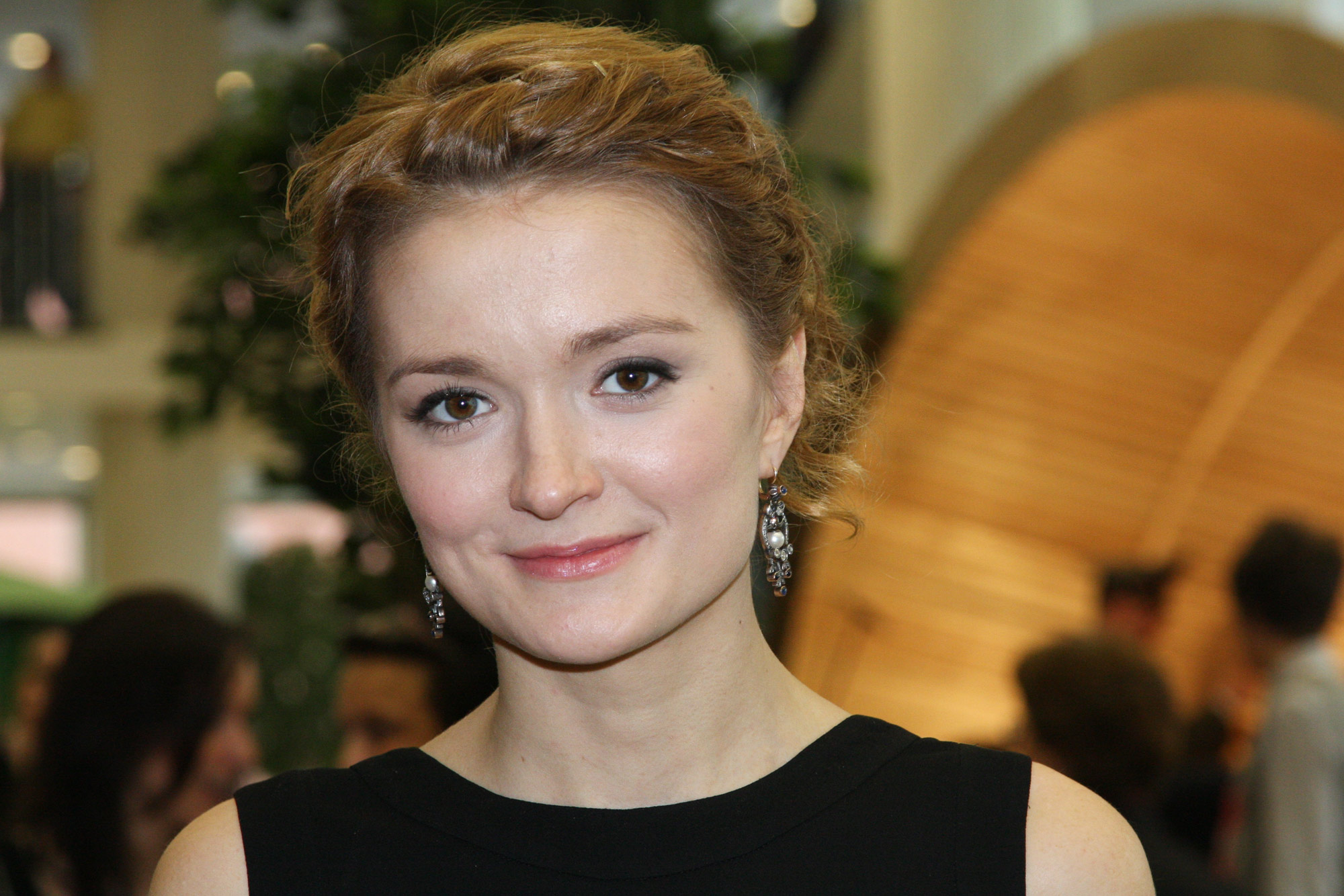
Nadezhda Mikhalkova, as an adult, reprised her role as Nadia in Burnt by the Sun 2: Exodus and Burnt by the Sun 3: The Citadel.

Nikita Mikhalkov directed and reprised his role as Sergei Petrovich Kotov in his 2010 and 2011 sequels, Burnt by the Sun 2: Exodus and Burnt by the Sun 3: The Citadel. It competed for the Palme d'Or at the 2010 Cannes Film Festival. Oleg Menshikov and Nadezhda Mikhalkova also reprised their roles from the original film.

Playwright Peter Flannery adapted the film as a stage drama by the same name. It opened at the National Theatre, London, in March 2009. The cast included the Irish actor Ciarán Hinds as General Kotov, Rory Kinnear as Mitya, and Michelle Dockery as Maroussia.

== See also ==
- List of submissions to the 67th Academy Awards for Best Foreign Language Film
- List of Russian submissions for the Academy Award for Best Foreign Language Film
