= Viktor Merezhko =

Russian screenwriter (1937–2022)

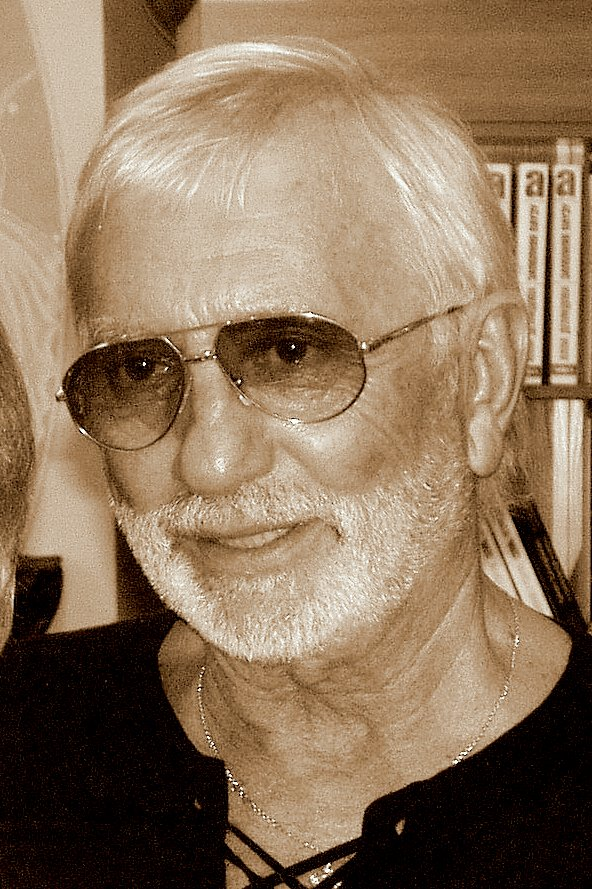
- Born: Viktor Ivanovich Merezhko; 28 July 1937; Rostov Oblast, Russian SFSR, Soviet Union
- Died: 30 January 2022 (aged 84); Moscow, Russia
- Occupations: dramatist, screenwriter, TV presenter, film director
- Years active: 1967–2022
- Awards: USSR State Prize (1987)

Viktor Ivanovich Merezhko (Russian: Виктор Иванович Мережко; 28 July 1937 – 30 January 2022) was a Soviet and Russian screenwriter, filmmaker, playwright, actor, writer, and television presenter. He was awarded the honorary title People's Artist of the Russian Federation in 2014.

== Life and career ==
In 1952, together with his family, he moved to the village of Russkaya Polyana near the city of Cherkasy (Ukraine). He learned Ukrainian language and graduated from the Ukrainian school. He tried to enter the Kyiv Polytechnic Institute at the Faculty of Cinematographers, but he could not stand the entrance exams. For a year, he worked in the woods of a woodcutter, then went to work in Arkhangelsk.

In 1956 he went to Lviv, where he entered and graduated from Ukrainian Academy of Printing.

In 1963 he sent his work to the contest in Moscow. In 1964-1968 he studied at VGIK (Alexey Speshnev's workshop, then Ilya Vaysfeld). Already in the second year of the VGIK the script of Viktor was shot by his first short film.

According to Viktor Merezhko's scripts, 50 films and 12 animated films were shot, among them such famous films as Family Relations, Flights in Dreams and Reality, You are waited by Citizen Nikanorova, A Lonely Woman Wants to Meet, Assia and the Hen with the Golden Eggs. He is known as a playwright.

In 1989-1994, Merezhko led the popularity in the USSR program Kinopanorama. Since 1994 to 2002 he was the host of the program My Cinema of TV channel TV-6 Moscow.

He was Secretary of Union of Cinematographers of the Russian Federation, Member of the Writers' Union of Russia, Honored Artist of the RSFSR (1988).

From the very first of his works as screenwriter, Viktor Merezhko has indicated his interest in the moral problems of modern society. In his works, the relationship of the characters and their social conflict determine the plot of the films.

Merezhko died from COVID-19 complications in Moscow on 30 January 2022, at the age of 84.
