= Anna: 6–18 =

1994 film directed by Nikita Mikhalkov

- Directed by: Nikita Mikhalkov
- Written by: Nikita Mikhalkov
- Produced by: Nikita Mikhalkov
- Starring: Anna Mikhalkova
- Cinematography: Vadim Yusov; Pavel Lebeshev; Elizbar Karavaev; Vadim Alisov
- Music by: Eduard Artemyev
- Production company: TriTe
- Release date: 1994
- Running time: 98 minutes
- Countries: USSR; Russia; France
- Language: Russian

Anna: 6–18 or (Russian: Анна: от 6 до 18, romanized: Anna ot 6 do 18) is a documentary film by director Nikita Mikhalkov, which was shot during a period of thirteen years, from 1980 to 1993. The main heroine of the film is Anna, the eldest daughter of Mikhalkov. Anna herself has repeatedly said that she strongly disliked the picture, explaining that she considers it a "dissection of her private life" and "exhibitionism of the soul".

== Plot ==
Over the years of her life (from 6 to 18 years) daughter of film director Anna answers the same questions about her father. The viewer has the opportunity to observe how Anna's point of view changes concerning her surrounding world. The girl's answers are edited with newsreel footage of those years during which the questions were asked. Through the prism of Anna's responses many key events are represented: the death of General Secretary Leonid Brezhnev, Yuri Andropov, Konstantin Chernenko, the restructuring, collapse of the Soviet Union, and the rise of Yeltsinism.

== Cast ==
- Anna Mikhalkova – Nikita Mikhalkov's eldest daughter
- Nadezhda Mikhalkova – Nikita Mikhalkov's youngest daughter
- Artyom Mikhalkov – Nikita Mikhalkov's second son
- Nikita Mikhalkov – himself

== Awards ==
- "Silver Dove" of the international documentary film festival in Leipzig (1994)
- Grand Prix of International Film Festival of Slavic and Orthodox peoples "Golden Knight" (1994)
- Prize for Best Documentary at the Hamptons International Film Festival (1996)
