= Close to Eden =

Urga Close to Eden
- DVD cover
- Directed by: Nikita Mikhalkov
- Written by: Rustam Ibragimbekov; Nikita Mikhalkov
- Produced by: Michel Seydoux; Jean-Louis Piel; René Cleitman
- Starring: Bayaertu; Badema; Vladimir Gostyukhin
- Cinematography: Vilen Kalyuta
- Edited by: Joëlle Hache
- Music by: Eduard Artemyev
- Production companies: Aria; Caméra One; Centre National de la Cinématographie; Hachette Première; Ministry of Culture and Communications; Studio Trite; Union Générale Cinématographique
- Distributed by: Miramax
- Release date: 1991
- Running time: 118 minutes
- Country: Soviet Union
- Languages: Mongolian; Russian; Mandarin

Urga (Russian: «У́рга — территория любви», romanized: Urga — territoriya lyubvi, lit. '"Urga — Territory of Love"') is a 1991 Russian adventure drama film by Russian director, screenwriter and producer Nikita Mikhalkov. It was released in North America as Close to Eden. It depicts the friendship between a Russian truck driver and a Mongolian shepherd in Inner Mongolia.

The film was an international co-production between companies based in Russia and France. It received generally positive reviews from critics, winning the Golden Lion and the European Film Award for Best Film.

== Story ==
Gombo, a Mongolian shepherd, lives in a yurt in Inner Mongolia with his wife, three children, and mother. Gombo desires sexual intercourse with his wife, which puts his wife ill at ease: having a fourth child would break Chinese law. Meanwhile, Sergei, a buffoonish Russian truck driver falling asleep at the wheel, stops after a close call and attempts to awaken himself. His stretching turns to frolicking, and he wanders off. He discovers a corpse and quickly returns to his truck, accidentally driving into the river in his haste. Back at the yurt, the family is portrayed as unsophisticated and traditional people. They work together performing simple tasks like weaving by hand and using a horse cart to work leather. Gombo's drunk, horse-riding relative rides through the scene, stopping along the way to give them a movie poster for Cobra, which displays a muscular, gun-toting Sylvester Stallone.

Shortly after, Sergei is rescued by Gombo and taken to his family's yurt. Gombo's young son is stunned by the tattoos on Sergei's back, which include music notes. A comedic scene unfolds as Gombo, together with his family, goes about the usual and tidy work of slaughtering and cooking a sheep, much to Sergei's horror. We continue to be entertained as Sergei courageously consumes sheep and sheep broth. At some point, we find out that the carrion birds were not eating a human corpse. Gombo shows off the movie poster. Gombo's young daughter plays the accordion while Sergei takes on a distant look as he remembers fighting in the war. The next morning, Gombo's drunk, horse-riding relative rides by, stopping to give Gombo and his wife an apple and a hard-boiled egg.

Gombo and Sergei go into the nearest city together, where Gombo is supposed to buy condoms; instead, he chooses to wander the town. Elsewhere, Sergei spends time with his girlfriend, and they have sex. Gombo's drunk, horse-riding relative rides through the hallway outside their room, stopping to peek above the door and chuckle. He gives an apple to the woman's son, who is stranded in the hallway until the couple finishes. Later, Gombo, Sergei, and a friend meet at a nightclub. Sergei, a former army bandsman, becomes drunk and convinces the band to play the song from his tattoos, "On the Hills of Manchuria," while he sings along. He is arrested and bailed out of jail by Gombo's uncle who lives in the city.

Gombo returns home, and along the way, stops to eat. We see that he has bought a bicycle and a TV. He falls asleep and has a strange dream featuring his drunk, horseback-riding relative as Genghis Khan and his wife as the Khan's wife. The Khan flies a black flag with a white eagle. In the dream, both he and Sergei are captured and killed, while the TV set is destroyed.

Gombo awakes from his dream and arrives home with the TV and other items. The family members interact with the new objects in stereotypical ways: Gombo gives his mother bubble-wrap from the packaging, and she proceeds to pop one single bubble at a time; his daughter plays with the bell on the bicycle, and his son pops out of the box the TV arrived in. Gombo ignores his wife, so she remains sitting and kneading dough in preparation for dinner. Gombo, together with his children, sets up the TV and a small wind turbine.

He and his family switch between watching a news broadcast, the presidents of the US and Russia officially agreeing to peaceful interaction, and a badly sung variety show. The TV sits under the movie poster. Gombo's wife, saddened when learning that he bought no condoms, leaves the yurt. We then see her on the TV, and she invites her husband to follow her with a gesture. Gombo follows and leaves the yurt, appears on the TV, and follows her out onto the steppes, sticking an urga (a long stick with a lasso on the end used to capture animals) into the ground in a traditional signal that a couple is being intimate. There are shots of the happy family members and Sergei. The scene returns to the urga, and a voiceover from Gombo's fourth son, who was conceived at this time, concludes the film. The urga is replaced by an industrial chimney belching smoke.

== Cast ==
- Badema as Pagma, Gombo's wife / Genghis Khan's wife
- Bayaertu as Gombo
- Vladimir Gostyukhin as Serguei, Russian truck driver
- Baoyinhexige as Bajartou, local weirdo / Genghis Khan
- Bao Yongyan as Bourma, Gombo's daughter
- Wurinile as Bouin, Gombo's son
- Babouchka as Babouchka, Gombo's mother
- Wang Biao as Wang Biao, pianist
- Bao Jinsheng
- Nikolai Vachtchiline as Nikolai, Serguei's friend
- Larisa Kuznetsova as Marina, Serguei's wife
- Jon Bochinski as Stanislas
- Nikita Mikhalkov as cyclist

== Reception and legacy ==
=== Critical response ===
Urga has an approval rating of 100% on review aggregator website Rotten Tomatoes, based on 5 reviews, and an average rating of 6.9/10.

=== Accolades ===
Urga won the Golden Lion at the Venice Film Festival and Best European Film at the European Film Awards. It was also nominated for an Academy Award for Best Foreign Film, and for a Golden Globe in the same category.

=== Influence ===
The film is credited with sparking Czech writer Petra Hůlová's initial interest in Mongolia, leading to study, then an exchange year in Ulan Bator, and then to her first novel, Paměť mojí babičce (2002; literally "in memory of my grandmother"), in English translation published as All This Belongs to Me (2009, Northwestern University Press).

In the first section of Michelangelo Antonioni's film Beyond the Clouds, the two protagonists reunite at a screening of Close to Eden.

== See also ==
- List of submissions to the 65th Academy Awards for Best Foreign Language Film
- List of Russian submissions for the Academy Award for Best Foreign Language Film
