= Igor Shmakov =

Russian actor

Igor Shmakov (1985–2011) was a Russian actor. He appeared in the 2010 film Burnt by the Sun 2.
