= Lev Nikolaev =

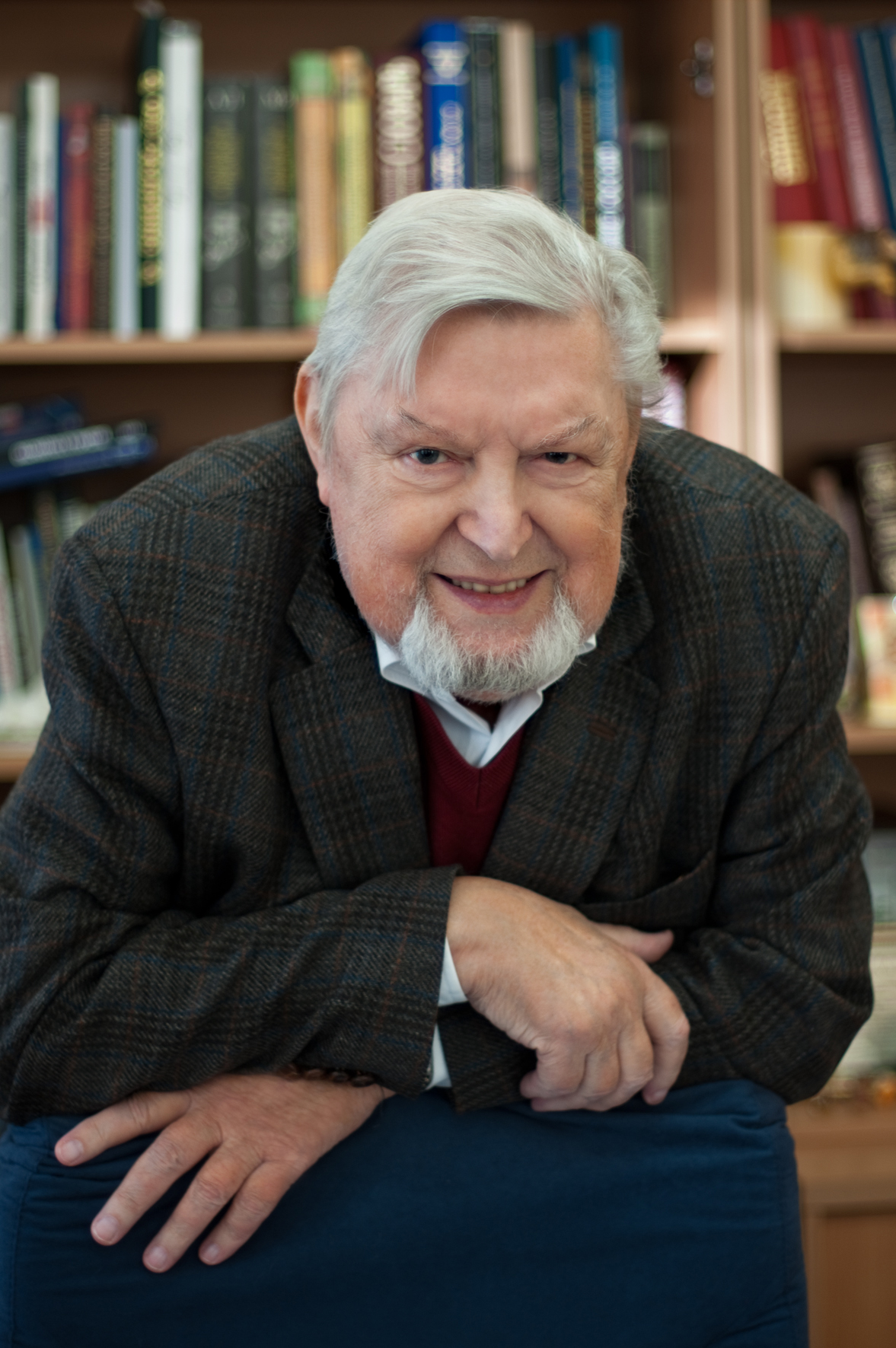

Lev Nikolaevich Nikolaev (Russian: Лев Николаевич Николаев; 16 November 1937 — 21 May 2011) was a Russian TV columnist, popularizer of science, culturologist.

== Biography ==
He was born on 16 November 1937 in the city of Slavyansk-on-Kuban. In 1954 he graduated from high school and art school of the city of Krasnodar. In 1960 he graduated MSU Faculty of Physics, in 1965 post-graduate year. He studied lakes, worked at the Limnological Institute of the Siberian Branch of the Russian Academy of Sciences. In the late 1950s and early 1960s he worked as a screenwriter, cameraman, director of documentary films. He studied film montage at Mosfilm group by Eldar Ryazanov. After finishing graduate school reserves the science and devotes himself to documentary filmmaking.

From 1973 he worked in television as a program editor, director and television presenter.

He was script author of more than a hundred documentaries and educational films, more than a dozen of which were awarded prizes of Soviet, Russian and international film festivals.

== Death ==
On the night of 20 to 21 May 2011, after a long illness, aged 73. He was buried in Moscow at Kuntsevo Cemetery.

== Awards ==
- 1980, 1986 — USSR State Prize
- 2004, 2005 — TEFI
- 2007 — Order of Honor for his many years of fruitful work in the field of broadcasting.
