= Fandorin =

Fandorin (Russian: Фандорин) is a fictional Russian surname in the novels of Boris Akunin, possibly created from French Fandorn. Series protagonists include:

- Erast Fandorin (1856–1919/20)
- Nicholas Fandorin (born 1960)

== See also ==
- Earl Van Dorn
- von Dorn
