= The Barber of Siberia =

- Original Russian language poster
- Directed by: Nikita Mikhalkov
- Written by: Nikita Mikhalkov; Rustam Ibragimbekov; Rospo Pallenberg
- Produced by: Nikita Mikhalkov; Michel Seydoux
- Starring: Julia Ormond; Richard Harris; Oleg Menshikov; Aleksei Petrenko; Marina Neyolova; Vladimir Ilyin; Daniel Olbrychski; David Nykl
- Cinematography: Pavel Lebeshev
- Edited by: Enzo Meniconi
- Music by: Eduard Artemyev; Anatoly Dokumentov
- Release date: 30 October 1998
- Running time: 180 minutes
- Countries: Russia; France; Italy; Czech Republic; United States
- Languages: Russian; English
- Budget: $35 million

The Barber of Siberia (Russian: Сибирский цирюльник, translit. Sibirskiy tsiryulnik) is a 1998 Russian drama film that re-united the Academy Award-winning team of director, writer, producer and actor Nikita Mikhalkov, screenwriter Rustam Ibragimbekov and producer Michel Seydoux. It was screened out of competition at the 1999 Cannes Film Festival. The film was selected as the Russian entry for the Best Foreign Language Film at the 71st Academy Awards, but was disqualified for not getting a print to Los Angeles in time as a nominee.

== Plot ==
Jane Callahan (Julia Ormond), a beautiful American lady, writes to her son, a cadet at a famous military academy, about a long kept secret. Twenty years ago she arrived in Russia to assist Douglas McCracken (Richard Harris), an obsessive engineer who needs the Grand Duke Alexei Alexandrovich's patronage to sponsor his invention, a massive machine to harvest the Siberian forests. On her travels, she meets two men who would change her life forever: a handsome young cadet Andrei Tolstoy (Oleg Menshikov) with whom she shares a fondness for opera, and the powerful General Radlov (Aleksei Petrenko) who is entranced by her beauty and wants to marry her. Tolstoy and Radlov, much to the surprise and indignation of the latter, become rivals for Jane's love. She confides a deep secret to Tolstoy, promises to marry him, and together they spend a passionate night of love fathering her child. But later he overhears Jane denying her interest in him to the General, in order to win the general's favour and be granted an audience with the Grand Duke. Distraught, Tolstoy attacks the General who arrests his young rival on false charges and banishes him to Siberia to seven years of hard labor and a further five years of exile.

== Cast ==
- Julia Ormond as Jane Callahan-McCracken
- Richard Harris as Douglas McCracken
- Oleg Menshikov as Andrei Tolstoy / Andrew McCracken
- Aleksei Petrenko as General Nikolai Radlov
- Marina Neyolova as Andrei Tolstoy's mother
- Vladimir Ilyin as Captain Pavel Mokin, the cadets' governor
- Daniel Olbrychski as Kopnovsky
- Anna Mikhalkova as Dunyasha, Tolstoy family's maid
- Avangard Leontiev as Nicolas, Andrei's uncle
- Elizabeth Spriggs as Countess Perepyolkina
- Mac McDonald as Sergeant "Mad Dog" O'Leary
- Yevgeny Steblov as Grand Duke Alexei
- Leonid Kuravlyov as Sergeant Major Bukin
- Robert Hardy as Forsten
- Marat Basharov as Cadet Polievskyy
- Nikita Tatarenkov as Cadet Alibekov
- Artyom Mikhalkov as Cadet Buturlin
- Georgiy Dronov as Cadet Nazarov
- Viktor Verzhbitsky as Grand Duke's aide-de-camp
- Alexander Lenkov as the scientist
- Pierre Narcisse as the Prince's servant
- Maria Maksakova Jr. as the boarding schoolgirl
- Nikita Mikhalkov as Tsar Alexander III

== Music ==
- Chopin – Nocturne in D-flat major, Op. 27, No. 2. Jane plays the piece while General Radlov proposes to her.
- Mozart – Piano Concerto No. 23 in A major, K. 488 II Adagio. This is the movement that Jane's son plays to convince his drill sergeant that "Mozart was a great composer".

== Reception ==
On review aggregator Rotten Tomatoes, the film holds an approval rating of 13% based on 8 reviews, with an average rating of 2/10.

== See also ==
- List of submissions to the 71st Academy Awards for Best Foreign Language Film
- List of Russian submissions for the Academy Award for Best Foreign Language Film
