= Nikita Mikhalkov =

Russian filmmaker and actor (born 1945)

- Никита Михалков
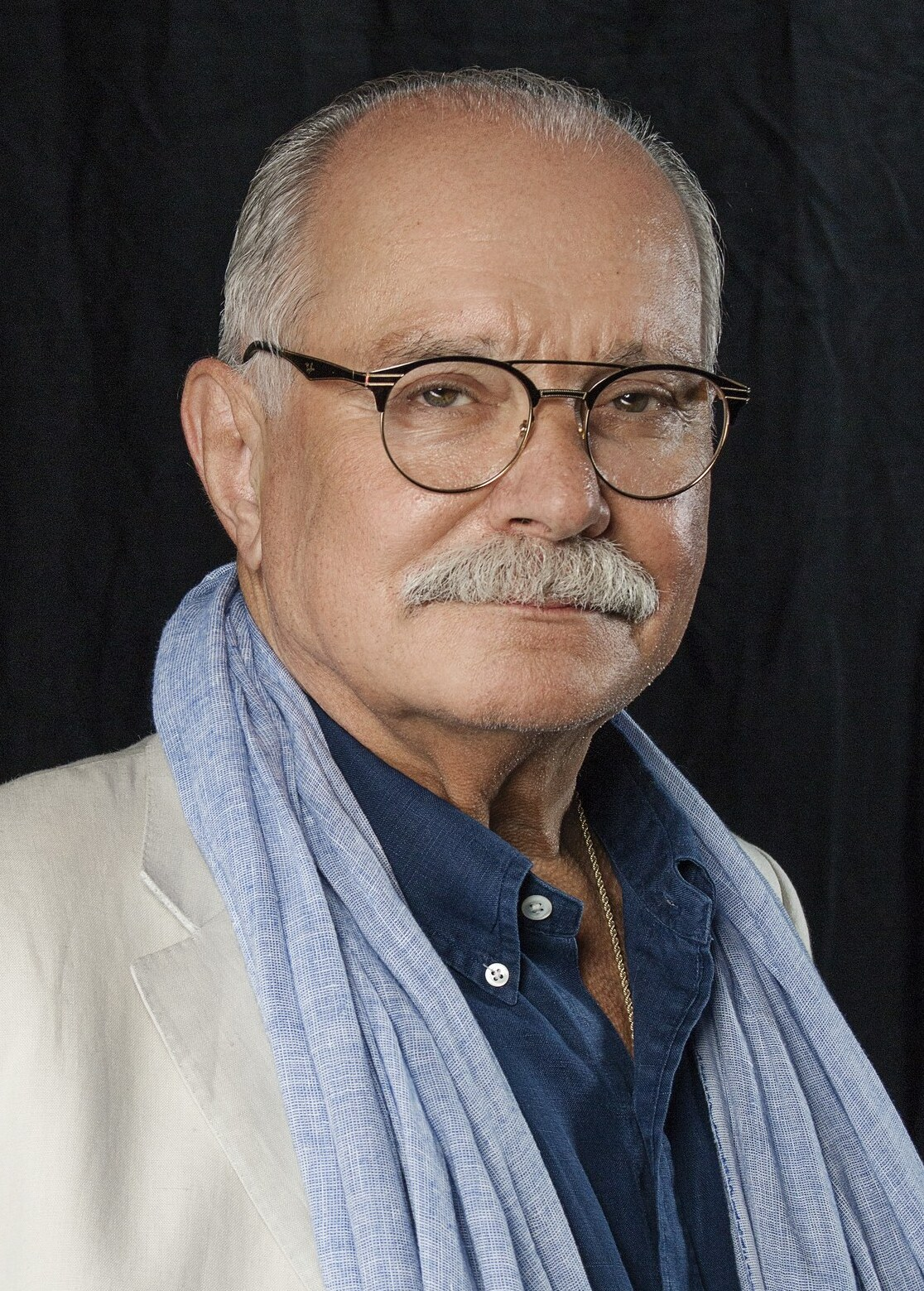
- Mikhalkov in 2023
- Born: 21 October 1945 (age 80); Moscow, Russian SFSR, Soviet Union
- Occupations: Film director; screenwriter; actor; producer
- Years active: 1959–present
- Spouses: Anastasiya Vertinskaya (m. 1966–1971) Tatiana Mikhalkova (m. 1973)
- Children: 4, including Anna and Nadezhda
- Father: Sergey Mikhalkov
- Relatives: Andrei Konchalovsky (brother)
- Mikhaikov's voice Mikhailkov on the Echo of Moscow program, 2007

Nikita Sergeyevich Mikhalkov (Note: In this name that follows East Slavic naming customs, the patronymic is Sergeyevich and the family name is Mikhalkov.) (Russian: Никита Сергеевич Михалков; born 21 October 1945) is a Russian filmmaker and actor. He made his directorial debut with the Red Western film At Home Among Strangers (1974) after appearing in a series of films, including the romantic comedy Walking the Streets of Moscow (1964), the war drama The Red and the White (1967), the romantic drama A Nest of Gentry (1969) and the adventure drama The Red Tent (1969). His subsequent films include the romantic comedy-drama A Slave of Love (1976), the drama An Unfinished Piece for Mechanical Piano (1977), the romantic drama Five Evenings (1978), the drama Without Witness (1983) and the romantic comedy-drama Dark Eyes (1987). Mikhalkov then directed, co-wrote and appeared in the adventure drama film Close to Eden (1991), for which he received the Golden Lion at the Venice International Film Festival and an Academy Award nomination.

Following the Soviet Union's dissolution, Mikhalkov directed, co-wrote and starred in the historical drama Burnt by the Sun (1994), for which he won the Grand Prix at the Cannes Film Festival and the Academy Award for Best Foreign Language Film. He received the "Special Lion" at the Venice Film Festival for his contribution to the cinematography and an Academy Award nomination for the legal drama 12 (2007).

Mikhalkov is a three-time laureate of the State Prize of the Russian Federation (1993, 1995, 1999) and Full Cavalier of the Order "For Merit to the Fatherland". In honor of his 80th birthday, in 2025, he was awarded the Order of St. Andrew the Apostle the First-Called, Russia's highest state award.

== Ancestry ==
Mikhalkov was born in Moscow into the noble and distinguished Mikhalkov family. His great-grandfather was the imperial governor of Yaroslavl, whose mother was a princess of the House of Golitsyn. Nikita's father, Sergey Mikhalkov, was best known as writer of children's literature, although he also wrote lyrics to his country's national anthem on three occasions spanning nearly 60 years – two sets of lyrics used for the Soviet national anthem, and the current lyrics of the Russian national anthem. Mikhalkov's mother, poet Natalia Konchalovskaya, was the daughter of the avant-garde artist Pyotr Konchalovsky and granddaughter of another outstanding painter, Vasily Surikov. Nikita's older brother is the filmmaker Andrei Konchalovsky, primarily known for his collaboration with Andrei Tarkovsky and his own Hollywood action films, such as Runaway Train and Tango & Cash.

== Career ==
=== Early acting career ===
Mikhalkov studied acting at the children's studio of the Moscow Art Theatre and later at the Shchukin School of the Vakhtangov Theatre. While still a student, he appeared in Georgiy Daneliya's film Walking the Streets of Moscow (1964) and his brother Andrei Konchalovsky's film Home of the Gentry (1969). He was soon on his way to becoming a star of the Soviet stage and cinema.

=== Directing ===
While continuing to pursue his acting career, he entered VGIK, the state film school in Moscow, where he studied directing under filmmaker Mikhail Romm, teacher to his brother and Andrei Tarkovsky. He directed his first short film in 1968, I'm Coming Home, and another for his graduation, A Quiet Day at the End of the War in 1970. Mikhalkov had appeared in more than 20 films, including his brother's Uncle Vanya (1972), before he co-wrote, directed and starred in his first feature, At Home Among Strangers in 1974, an Ostern set just after the 1920s civil war in Russia.

Mikhalkov established an international reputation with his second feature, A Slave of Love (1976). Set in 1917, it followed the efforts of a film crew to make a silent melodrama in a resort town while the Revolution rages around them. The film, based upon the last days of Vera Kholodnaya, was highly acclaimed upon its release in the U.S.

Mikhalkov's next film, An Unfinished Piece for Mechanical Piano (1977) was adapted by Mikhalkov from Chekhov's early play, Platonov, and won the first prize at the San Sebastián International Film Festival. In 1978, while starring in his brother's epic film Siberiade, Mikhalkov made Five Evenings, a love story about a couple separated by World War II, who meet again after eighteen years. Mikhalkov's next film, A Few Days from the Life of I. I. Oblomov (1980), with Oleg Tabakov in the title role, is based on Ivan Goncharov's classic novel about a lazy young nobleman who refuses to leave his bed. Family Relations (1981) is a comedy about a provincial woman in Moscow dealing with the tangled relationships of her relatives. Without Witness (1983) tracks a long night's conversation between a woman (Irina Kupchenko) and her ex-husband (Mikhail Ulyanov) when they are accidentally locked in a room. The film won the Prix FIPRESCI at the 13th Moscow International Film Festival.

In the early 1980s, Mikhalkov resumed his acting career, appearing in Eldar Ryazanov's immensely popular Station for Two (1982) and A Cruel Romance (1984). At that period, he also played Henry Baskerville in the Soviet screen version of The Hound of the Baskervilles. He also starred in many of his own films, including At Home Among Strangers, A Slave of Love, and An Unfinished Piece for Player Piano.

=== International success ===
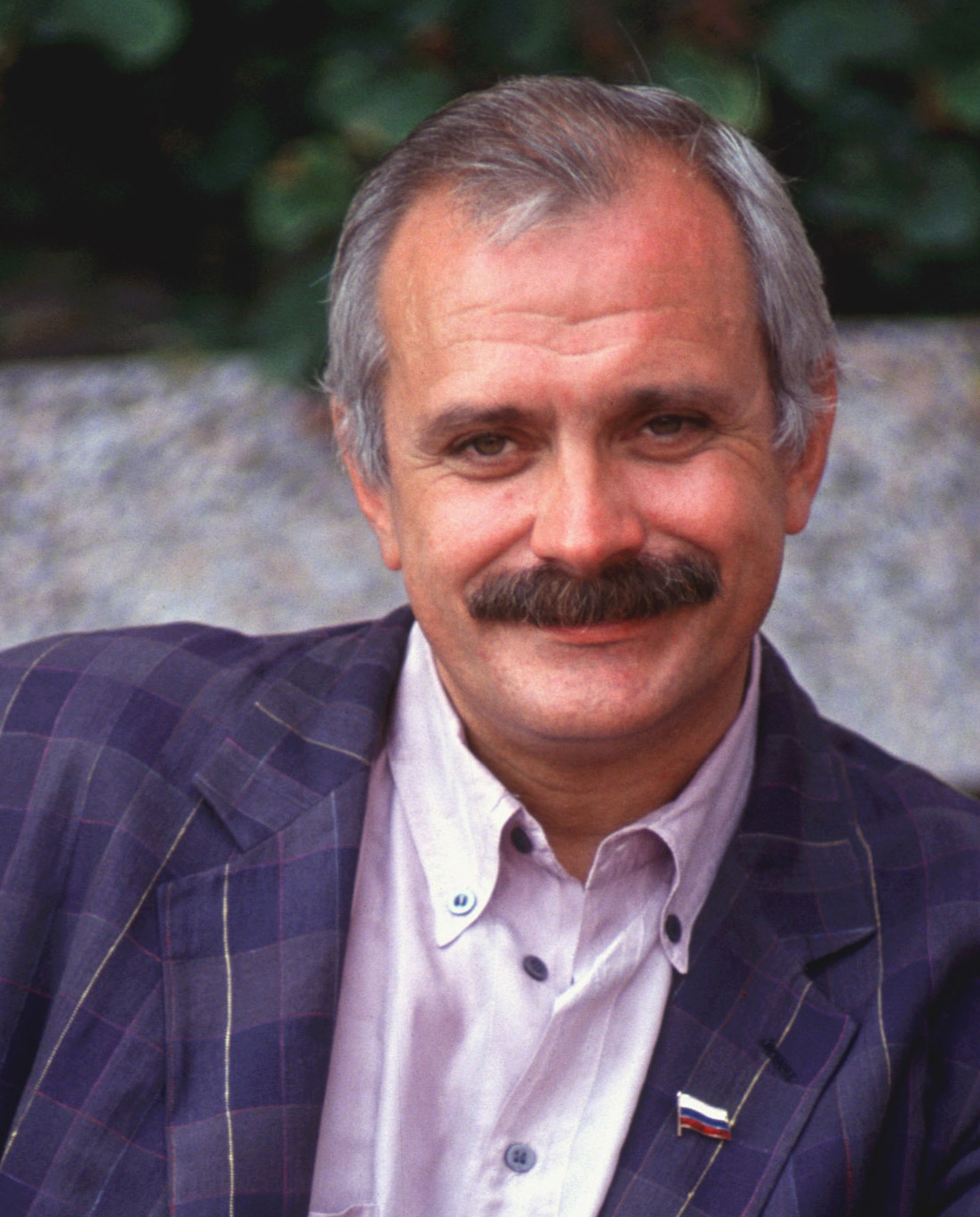
Mikhalkov, 41, at the 44th Venice International Film Festival

Incorporating several short stories by Chekhov, Dark Eyes (1987) stars Marcello Mastroianni as an old man who tells a story of a romance he had when he was younger, a woman he has never been able to forget. The film was highly praised, and Mastroianni received the Best Actor Prize at the 1987 Cannes Film Festival and an Academy Award nomination for his performance.

Mikhalkov's next film, Urga (1992, a.k.a. Close to Eden), set in the little-known world of the Mongols, received the Golden Lion at the Venice Film Festival and was nominated for the Academy Award for Best Foreign Language Film. Mikhalkov's Anna: 6–18 (1993) documents his daughter Anna as she grows from childhood to maturity.

Mikhalkov's most famous production to date, Burnt by the Sun (1994), was steeped in the paranoid atmosphere of Joseph Stalin's Great Terror. The film received the Grand Prize at Cannes and the Academy Award for Best International Feature Film, among many other honors. To date, Burnt by the Sun remains the highest-grossing film to come out of the former Soviet Union.

In 1996, he was the head of the jury at the 46th Berlin International Film Festival.

=== Recent career ===
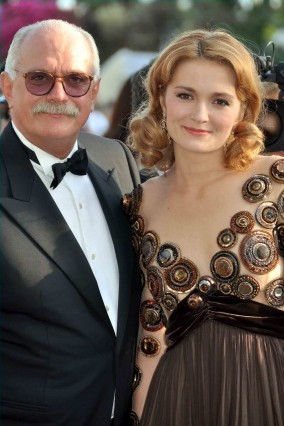
Mikhalkov and his daughter Nadezhda at the 2010 Cannes Film Festival

Mikhalkov used the critical and financial triumph of Burnt by the Sun to raise $25 million for his most epic venture to date, The Barber of Siberia (1998). The film, which was screened out of competition at the 1999 Cannes Film Festival, was designed as a patriotic extravaganza for domestic consumption. It featured Julia Ormond and Oleg Menshikov, who regularly appears in Mikhalkov's films, in the leading roles. The director himself appeared as Tsar Alexander III of Russia.

The film received the Russian State Prize and spawned rumours about Mikhalkov's presidential ambitions. The director, however, chose to administer the Russian cinema industry. Despite much opposition from rival directors, he was elected the President of the Russian Society of Cinematographers and has managed the Moscow Film Festival since 2000. He also set the Russian Academy Golden Eagle Award in opposition to the traditional Nika Award.

In 2005, Mikhalkov resumed his acting career, starring in three brand-new movies – The Councillor of State, a Fandorin mystery film which broke the Russian box-office records, Dead Man's Bluff, a noir-drenched comedy about the Russian Mafia, and Krzysztof Zanussi's Persona non grata.

In 2007, Mikhalkov directed and starred in 12, a Russian adaptation of Sidney Lumet's court drama 12 Angry Men. In September 2007, 12 received a special Golden Lion for the "consistent brilliance" of its work and was praised by many critics at the Venice Film Festival. In 2008, 12 was named as a nominee for Best Foreign Language Film for the 80th Academy Awards. Commenting on the nomination, Mikhalkov said, "I am overjoyed that the movie has been noticed in the United States and, what's more, was included in the shortlist of five nominees. This is a significant event for me."

He also served as the executive producer of an epic film 1612.

Mikhalkov presented his "epic drama" Burnt by the Sun 2 at the 2010 Cannes Film Festival, but did not receive any awards. The film was selected in 2011 as the Russian entry for the Best International Feature Film at the 84th Academy Awards.

In 2022, he proposed organizing the Eurasian Film Academy and the Diamond Butterfly film award.

== Personal life ==
Mikhalkov's first wife was renowned Russian actress Anastasiya Vertinskaya, whom he married on 6 March 1967. They had a son, Stepan (born September 1966).

With his second wife, former model Tatyana, he had a son Artyom (born 8 December 1975), and daughters Anna (born 1974) and Nadya (born 27 September 1986).

=== Political activity ===
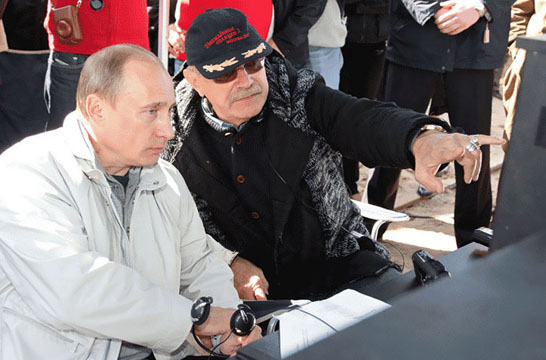
Mikhalkov with Russian Prime Minister Vladimir Putin on the set of the movie Burnt by the Sun 2 in Leningrad Oblast on 13 May 2008

Mikhalkov is actively involved in Russian politics. He is known for his at times Russian nationalist and Slavophile views. Mikhalkov was instrumental in propagating Ivan Ilyin's ideas in post-Soviet Russia. He authored several articles about Ilyin and came up with the idea of transferring his remains from Switzerland to the Donskoy Monastery in Moscow, where the philosopher had dreamed to find his last retreat. The ceremony of reburial, also of Anton Denikin, a general whose slogan was ‘Russia, one and indivisible’ was held on 3 October 2005.

In October 2006, Mikhalkov visited Serbia, giving moral support to Serbia's sovereignty over Kosovo. In 2008, he visited Serbia to support Tomislav Nikolić who was running as the ultra-nationalist candidate for the Serb presidency at the time. Mikhalkov took part in a meeting of "Nomocanon", a Serb youth organization which denies war crimes committed by Serbs in the 1992–99 Yugoslav Wars. In a speech given to the organization, Mikhalkov spoke about a "war against Orthodoxy" wherein he cited Orthodox Christianity as "the main force which opposes cultural and intellectual McDonald's". In response to his statement, a journalist asked Mikhalkov: "Which is better, McDonald's or Stalinism?" Mikhalkov answered: "That depends on the person". Mikhalkov has described himself as a monarchist.

Mikhalkov has been a strong supporter of Russian president Vladimir Putin. In October 2007, Mikhalkov, who produced a television program for Putin's 55th birthday, co-signed an open letter asking Putin not to step down after the expiry of his term in office.

Mikhalkov's vertical of power-style leadership of the Cinematographers' Union has been criticized by many prominent Russian filmmakers and critics as autocratic, and encouraged many members to leave and form a rival union in April 2010.

In 2015, Mikhalkov was banned from entering Ukraine for 5 years because of his support for the 2014 Russian annexation of Crimea. Despite his support for the annexation of Crimea he also called for the release of imprisoned Ukrainian filmmaker Oleg Sentsov.

On 24 February 2022, he advocated the international recognition of the Donetsk People's Republic and the Luhansk People's Republic by Russia and supported 2022 Russian invasion of Ukraine, citing betrayal by Ukraine and the killings of Donbas residents. He also criticized those Russian cultural figures who oppose Russia's invasion, arguing that they were silent about the crimes against Donbas, and now, in his opinion, they are only saving their property abroad from sanctions and teaching their children there.

In December 2022 the EU sanctioned Mikhalkov in relation to the 2022 Russian invasion of Ukraine. In January 2023, Ukraine imposed sanctions on Mikhalkov for his support of 2022 Russian invasion of Ukraine.

== In Internet ==
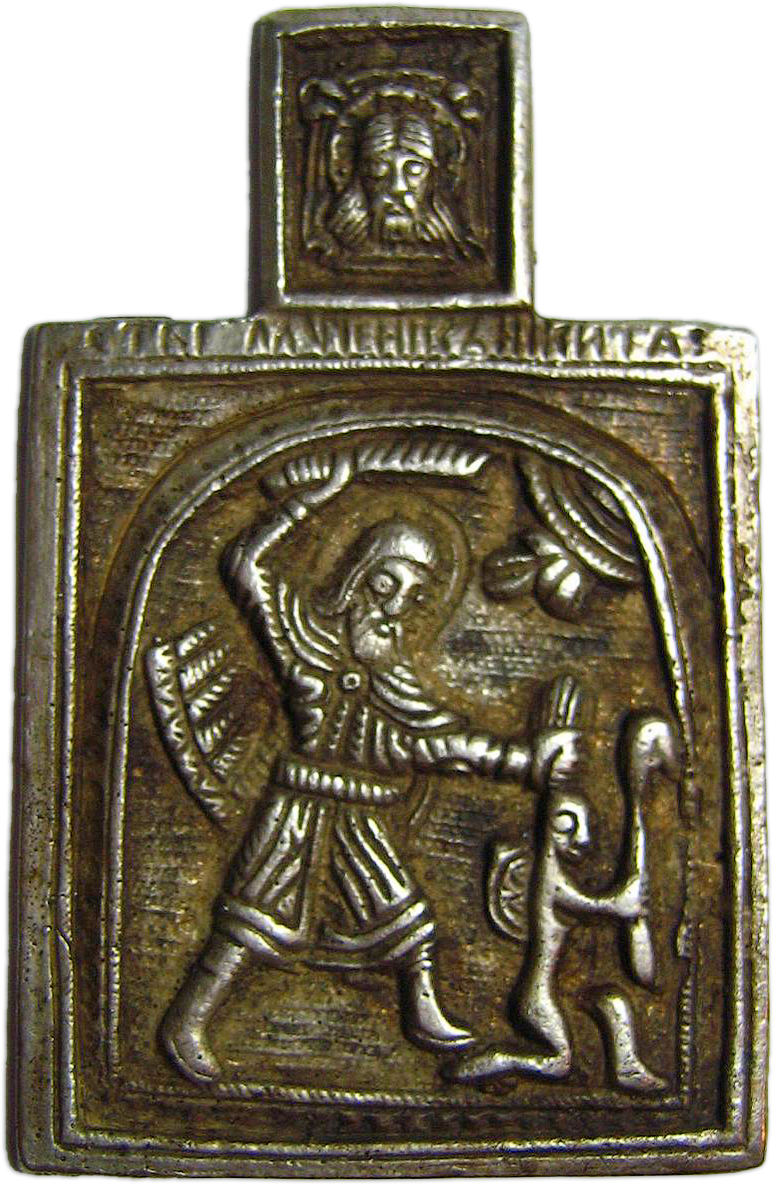
The logo of the author's program "Besogon TV"

On March 9, 2011, Nikita Mikhalkov registered a nikitabesogon account in LiveJournal, which was sold to another user in 2020. According to Mikhalkov, he chose a nickname named after his heavenly patron Nikita Besogon (Nikita, the exorcist). The video blog has become the format of communication. At the same time, the channel "Besogon TV" was registered on YouTube. After the account was advertised by famous bloggers, Mikhalkov's magazine gained popularity (in one month it was added to friends by more than 6 thousand users) and in terms of the number of views, he was in the top ten of the rating. In the videos, Mikhalkov answered users' questions, refuted various, in his opinion, untrue information on the Internet, spreading various conspiracy theories. In May 2011, he started a page on the VKontakte social network.

Later, on this basis, the Besogon TV program appeared, which was broadcast once a month by the Rossiya-24 TV channel from March 8, 2014, to May 1, 2020, without copyright and financial remuneration from the creators. The TV channel did not air the program twice.:

- In December 2015, due to ethical considerations, an issue devoted to the critical statements of the sports commentator of the Match TV channel Alexei Andronov about "lovers of Novorossiya and the Russian world" was not released; in February 2016, the conflict was resolved.;
- In May 2018, for unknown reasons, an episode about "communication difficulties in the modern world" and "officials who do not hear the people" was taken off the air; however, this episode, which was scheduled to be shown on May 5 and 6, was nevertheless shown twice by the TV channel on May 4.

Since January 20, 2019, the Besogon TV program has been broadcast on the Spas TV channel.

On May 1, 2020, after the release entitled "Who has the state in their pocket?" (about Bill Gates' possible plans to chip and destroy people under the guise of vaccination), its repeats over the weekend were removed from the broadcast network of the Rossiya-24 TV channel. Later, Mikhalkov stopped cooperating with this TV channel, but continued to release his program on YouTube. Since March 6, 2021, the program has been broadcast again, but broadcasts from previous years are being broadcast.

On October 21, 2020, it became known that the Besogon TV program is sometimes watched by the President of the Russian Federation, Vladimir Putin.

In March 2022, against the backdrop of the Russian invasion of Ukraine, Vladimir Medinsky, assistant to the president and former Minister of Culture of Russia, compared the current situation with the Troubles and called for "Besogon" to be translated into "as many languages as possible".

In August 2022, against the background of Russia's invasion of Ukraine, Mikhalkov presented Konstantin Tulinov, a former prisoner, as a hero in his Besogon TV program., who died in Ukraine. Russian media journalists found out that Tulinov was recruited into the Wagner private military company, and in the Kresty pre-trial detention center he participated in the torture of his fellow inmates. According to the data Gulagu.net Like Fontanka, Tulinov was an activist of the so-called "press hut".

As of January 2023, the number of subscribers of the Besogon TV channel was 1.47 million.

On January 18, 2024, the YouTube video hosting service blocked the Besogon TV channel for "... numerous or serious violations of YouTube's rules regarding discriminatory statements".

=== Conspiracy theories ===
In the author's program "Besogon TV" Mikhalkov repeatedly quoted various conspiracy theories. For example, in the issue "Who has the state in their pocket?", released on May 1, 2020, as part of the Besogon TV video blog on YouTube, he announced Bill Gates' alleged plans to reduce the world's population through vaccination against COVID-19; about chipping through certain vaccinations, with which a person can allegedly turn into a controlled robot; that prolonged isolation and distance learning is being introduced, possibly with the aim of creating a "digital addiction" among citizens. Ilya Varlamov, a Russian journalist and public figure, criticized Mikhalkov's statements about chipping:

"Patent 666" is actually called "A cryptocurrency system using body activity data." Microsoft has patented a scheme in which a certain cryptocurrency system can set tasks for the user and monitor their implementation using a gadget. (…)

What makes Mikhalkov think that this is a nanochip that is implanted into the human body through a vaccine? It will be more like a fitness bracelet or a headband like the one that big headphones have, or some kind of mini camera on a laptop or VR helmet that will monitor the movement of the pupils.

Why did Mikhalkov assume that this technology would be mandatory for all 7 billion people living on Earth? And for no reason, this is pure speculation. Like, try to refute it!

What makes Mikhalkov think that this technology will ever be used? As for patents, it's a special culture in America. A huge number of large and small companies are trying to patent any nonsense, so that they can compete to see how much money they can make from whom. This forces everyone to patent literally everything.

In September 2020, Mikhalkov shared a conspiracy theory about the protests in Belarus. According to Mikhalkov, some of the people in the photos from the protest were drawn using computer graphics, while Mikhalkov said that he could be trusted because he "says it as a professional.".

In 2020, Nikita Mikhalkov was nominated for an anti-award for promoting conspiracy theories. The anti-award, titled "Honorary Academician VRAL" (a satirical "academy" of pseudoscience), is organized by the project Anthropogenesis.ru as part of the scientific and educational forum "Scientists Against Myths". According to the results of the public voting stage, which concluded on 13 October 2020, Mikhalkov received the highest number of votes. However, at the final ceremony held on 1 November 2020, the award was instead given to Galina Chervonskaya, a Russian anti-vaccination activist.

Mikhalkov instead received a satirical "Vroskar Award" from the so-called "Lionic Film Academy", with the wording "for outstanding directorial and acting talent aimed at spreading delusional ideas".

In the May 23, 2023 issue of Living a Lie, Mikhalkov promoted a fringe moon conspiracy theory. In March 2024, he stated that the cause of Alexei Navalny's death was the Pfizer vaccine, which caused a blood clot to detach.

== Awards and achievements ==
=== State awards and titles ===
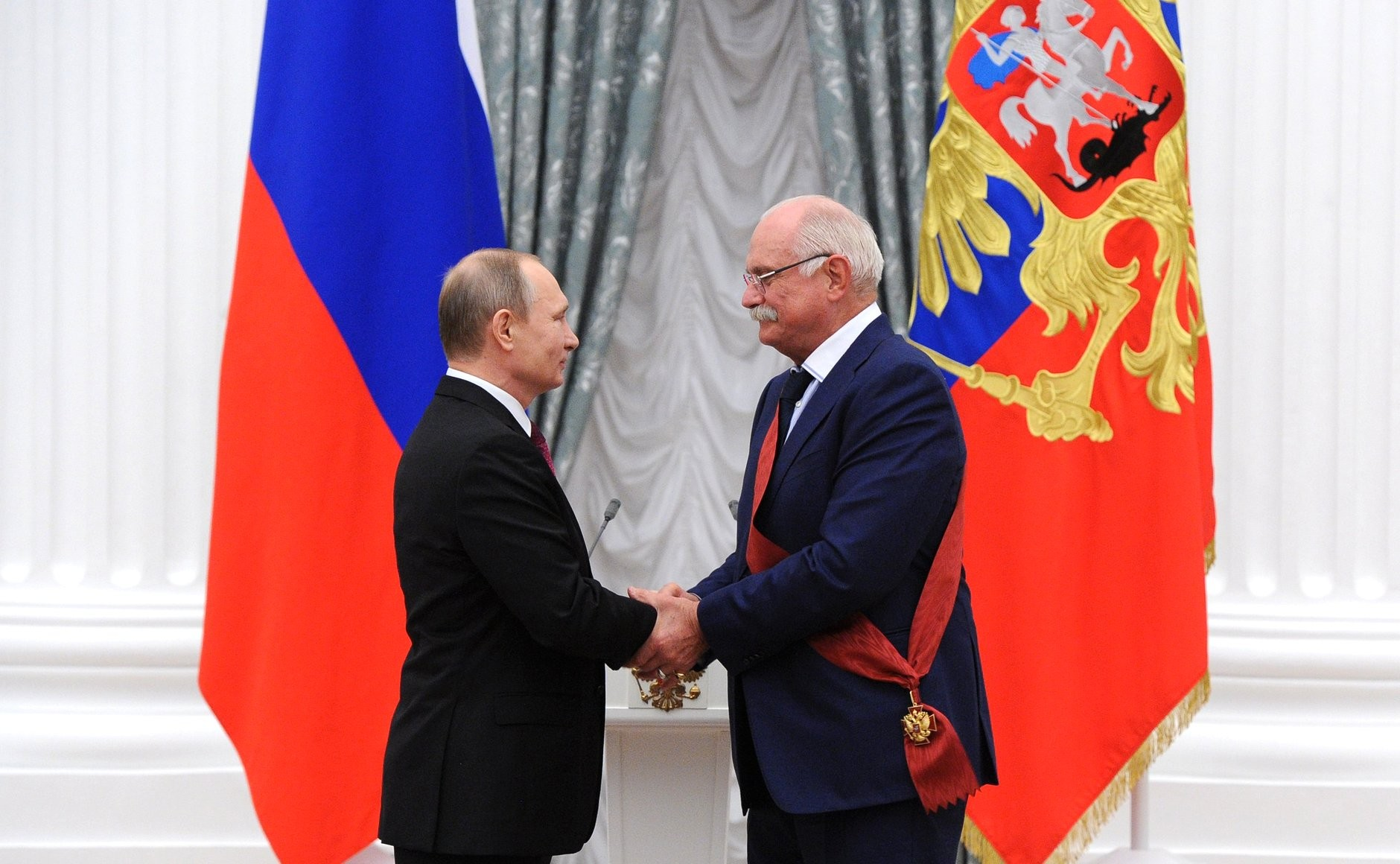
At the award ceremony of the Order of Merit for the Fatherland, 1st class. December 10th, 2015

Awards of the USSR and the Russian Federation

- "Honored Artist of the RSFSR" (December 31, 1976) — for his services in the field of Soviet cinematography.
- Lenin Komsomol Award (1978) — for creating images of contemporaries in cinema and high performing skills.
- "People's Artist of the RSFSR" (March 28, 1984) — for services to the development of Soviet cinematography.
- Order of Merit for the Fatherland, III class (October 17, 1995) — for services to the state, a great personal contribution to the development of cinematography and culture
- Certificate of Honor of the Government of the Russian Federation (October 20, 1995) — for his great personal contribution to the development of culture and many years of fruitful work in cinema.
- Letter of Gratitude from the President of the Russian Federation (July 11, 1996) — for his active participation in the organization and conduct of the election campaign of the President of the Russian Federation in 1996.
- Order of Merit for the Fatherland, II class (October 21, 2005) — for outstanding contribution to the development of Russian culture and art, and long-term creative activity.
- Order of Merit for the Fatherland, IV class (October 21, 2010) — for his great contribution to the development of Russian cinematographic art, long-term creative and social activities
- Order of Merit for the Fatherland, 1st class (June 29, 2015) — for outstanding contribution to the development of Russian culture, cinematographic and theatrical art, and long-term creative activity.
- Cultural Prize of the Government of the Russian Federation (March 2, 2020) — for the film "Upward Movement"»
- "Hero of Labor of the Russian Federation" (October 21, 2020) — for special merits in the development of national culture, art and many years of fruitful work.
- Order of St. Andrew (October 21, 2025) — for outstanding contributions to the development of domestic culture and cinematographic art, and many years of fruitful public activity.
- The Award of the Ministry of Defense of the Russian Federation in the field of culture and art (2021) — for contribution to the development of national culture and art.

Awards from other countries

- Officer of the Legion of Honor (France, 1992);
- Commander of the Legion of Honor (France, 1994);
- Knight Grand Cross of the Order of Merit of the Italian Republic (Italy, January 20, 2004)
- Gloria Artis Medal for Merit to Culture (Poland, September 1, 2005);
- Golden Medal of Merit of the Republic of Serbia (Serbia, 2013) — for special services in public and cultural activities;
- Gold Medal of the Mayor of Yerevan (Armenia, 2013);
- Dostlug Order (Azerbaijan, October 20, 2015) — for special merits in the development of cultural ties between the Republic of Azerbaijan and the Russian Federation;
- Order of St. Stephen (Serbian Orthodox Church, Montenegro, May 13, 2016) — for long-term cooperation in the field of culture and invaluable contribution to the support of the Orthodox spirit;
- Order of St. Sava (Serbian Orthodox Church, October 28, 2024).

Other awards and titles

- Order of St. Sergius of Radonezh, 1st class (Russian Orthodox Church).
- Jubilee Order "1020 Years of the Baptism of Kievan Rus" of the Ukrainian Orthodox Church (Moscow Patriarchate) (2008).
- Order of Holy Prince Daniel of Moscow, 1st class (Russian Orthodox Church, 2015).
- Order of St. Seraphim of Sarov, 1st class (Russian Orthodox Church, 2021)
- Medal "In Commemoration of the 10th Anniversary of the Return of Sevastopol to Russia" (March 18, 2024) - for personal contribution to the return of the city of Sevastopol to Russia.
- Honorary Member of the Russian Academy of Arts
- Certificate of Honor of the Moscow City Duma (December 16, 2015) - for services to the city community..
- Honorary degree of Doctor of Science of the International Academy of Sciences and Arts.
- Honorary Badge of Moscow State University (1995).
- Grand Prix of the national award "Russian of the Year" (Russian Academy of Business and Entrepreneurship, 2005).
- "Person of the Year in the Film Business" according to the results of the IV National Award in the Film Business (Kinoexpo-2005).
- Mikhail Chekhov Medal (Alexander Solzhenitsyn House of Russian Abroad, 2008).
- National Prize "Imperial Culture" named after Eduard Volodin for service to Russian culture (2009).
- Honorary Citizen of Belgrade (Serbia, 2015)
- National Prize "Imperial Culture" named after Eduard Volodin for the program "Besogon" and the book "My diaries 1972-1993. "Or was it all a dream to me?" (2016).
- Shostakovich Prize for contribution to world musical culture (2017).
- Award "Legends of Tavrida" (2020).
- Honorary Citizen of the Moscow Region (November 9, 2023).
- Honored Artist of the Chechen Republic (2024).
- Special Prize "For Outstanding Contribution to the Development of Theatre Arts" of the National Theatre Award "Golden Mask" (2025).

=== Public positions ===
- Member of the Presidium of the World Russian Council (1995).
- Member of the Russian Commission for UNESCO.
- Chairman of the Jury of the 46th Berlin Film Festival (1996).
- President of the Russian Cultural Foundation (since 1993). Member of the Presidium of the Council under the President of the Russian Federation for Culture and Arts.
- Member of the Expert Council under the Ministry of Culture of the Russian Federation.
- Member of the Board of Directors of Channel One OJSC (2004–2013).
- Chairman of the Board of Directors of Nikita Mikhalkov's Studio TRITE LLC.
- Chairman of the Board of Directors of Cinema Park.
- President of the Moscow International Film Festival.
- Academician of the National Academy of Cinematographic Arts and Sciences of Russia.
- Member of the commission of the National Academy of Arts and Sciences of Russia for nominating Russian films for the Oscars.
- Member of the European Film Academy.
- Participant of the Russian-Italian Forum-Dialogue on Civil Societies.
- Member of the Council on Information Policy of the Union of Russia and Belarus.
- Member of the competition committee for the creation of the anthem of the Union of Russia and Belarus.
- Member of the Presidium of the World Russian People's Council
- Co-chairman of the Council of the Russian Zemstvo Movement.
- Member of the expert council of the Person of the Year award
- Honorary Professor of VGIK.
- Chairman of the Board of Trustees of the Student and Debut Film Competition "Saint Anna".
- Honorary Chairman of the Jury of the Gorky Literary Prize (2013).
- Member of the Board of Trustees of the Charitable Foundation for Support of the Creative Heritage of Mikael Tariverdiev.
- Chairman of the creative expert commission for awarding prizes of the Central Federal District in the field of literature and art.
- Member of the Public Council of the Volga Federal District for the Development of Civil Society Institutions.
- Member of the board of trustees for the revival of the Korennaya Pustyn Monastery (Kursk Region).
- Member of the Board of Trustees of the Alexey Jordan Cadet Corps Assistance Fund.
- Member of the Board of Trustees of the National Football Foundation.
- Olympic Ambassador of the Bid Committee «Sochi-2014».
- Chairman of the Public Council under the Ministry of Defense of the Russian Federation from 2004 to 2011.
- President of the Council of the Russian Union of Copyright Holders.
- Member of the Board of Trustees of Oleg Deripaska's charitable foundation "Volnoe Delo"
- Member of the Board of Trustees of the St. Basil the Great Charitable Foundation.
- Trustee of Russian presidential candidate Vladimir Putin.
- Member of the Public Council under the Investigative Committee of the Russian Federation.
- Since February 2018 - Mentor of the public movement «Younarmy».
- Chairman of the Board of Trustees of the Russian State Academy of Intellectual Property.
- Since July 26, 2010 - Honorary Member of the Patriarchal Council for Culture.

== Criticism ==
A number of Nikita Mikhalkov's actions have received mixed reviews from society:

- On March 10, 1999, the director was holding a master class at the Central House of Cinematographers when two National Bolsheviks entered and began throwing eggs at him. Photos and videos show Nikita Mikhalkov kicking one of the hooligans in the face while he was being held tightly by the guards' arms. Marina Lesko wrote in the newspaper Komsomolskaya Pravda that he behaved "like a nobleman – the plebs don't even know that only equals fight 'with their fists', and Nikita really behaved like a gentleman.".
- In 2010, Mikhalkov proposed that the government introduce compensatory fees on the production and import of storage media and audio-video recording devices to finance cultural support funds in the amount of 5 rubles per piece of storage media and 0.5%, but not less than 100 rubles and not more than 10 thousand rubles, of the cost of the equipment. The bill proposed the following list of storage media: tapes, magnetic disks, optical, semiconductor and other storage media, equipment with an audio or video recording device and using magnetic, optical or semiconductor storage media (except laptops, photo and video cameras). In 2010, Rosokhrankultura transferred the right to the Russian Union of Copyright Holders (RUCH), headed by Nikita Mikhalkov, to collect 1% of all audiovisual information media sold in favor of copyright holders. A number of Internet users organized a campaign calling for sending a parcel with a delivery confirmation addressed to Mikhalkov, which would contain blanks and 6 coins worth 5 kopecks, which is a hint at the biblical 30 pieces of silver.
- In 2010, a number of media outlets Information has emerged that Nikita Mikhalkov is preparing lawsuits against some well-known LiveJournal users (in particular, Artemy Lebedev) for publishing caricatures of the posters for his film Burnt by the Sun 2 in their blogs.
- In May 2012, a letter signed by Nikita Mikhalkov and composer Andrei Eshpai was sent to the State Duma with a proposal to introduce a number of amendments to the Civil Code (CC) regarding copyrights and fees for distributing and listening to copyrighted content. The Russian Authors' Society (RAO) was going to demand a share of the income not only from movie theaters, television companies and radio stations, but also from the owners of all sites in the .ru and .рф domain zones.
- For a long time, Nikita Mikhalkov was approached by the 37th Patriarchal Exarch of All Belarus Filaret, public figures with a request for assistance in restoring the Church of the Holy Archangel Michael in the town of Zembin (Belarus), which was significantly damaged during the filming of one of the war episodes of the movie "Roll Call" (in this movie Mikhalkov played the role of a tank driver who drove a T-34 tank into the altar of the church and drove through the burial places of the clergy behind the altar). There were no responses to these requests.

=== Hotel in Maly Kozikhinsky Lane ===
Mikhalkov's studio "TriTe" is the customer of the demolition of a number of historical buildings in Maly Kozikhinsky Lane and the construction of a hotel in their place. At the end of October 2010, residents addressed an open letter to Mikhalkov, as well as to the Moscow mayor's office, protesting against the continuation of construction. Residents asked to review the project, reduce the height of the hotel, refuse to build an underground garage, and recreate the historical facades of the demolished buildings. People's Artist of the Russian Federation Tatyana Dogileva took an active part in picketing the construction site. On December 8, 2010, local residents who came to see the prefect of the Central Administrative District, among whom was Dogileva, were accused of seizing the prefecture. The prefect of the Central Administrative District stated that the construction of Mikhalkov's hotel would continue. Mikhalkov, in turn, threatened Dogileva with exclusion from the Union of Cinematographers "for non-payment of membership fees."

=== Flashing light ===
In 2010, in an interview with the REN-TV channel, when asked if it was true that he drove with a flashing light, Nikita Mikhalkov answered: "yes", "the flashing light belongs to the Ministry of Defense", thanks to the flashing light he "made it to the filming of the movie US-2". He added that "it has always been like this and it will always be like this!".

In May 2011, the director approached the leadership of the Russian Defense Ministry with a request to relieve him of his post as chairman of the Public Council under this department. He motivated this by his dissatisfaction with the quality of the organization of military parades on Victory Day in 2010 and 2011, the depressing state of Russian military education, and the alienation between society and the army. This meant his refusal of all the privileges associated with this position, primarily the special car signal. However, a source in the Defense Ministry told the Interfax agency that Mikhalkov made the decision to leave the Public Council after he was informed that the special signal had been removed from his car. According to him, "it is surprising that the famous film director's disapproval of the procedure for holding parades last and this year began to be expressed by him when the issue of the flashing light came up.". On May 23, 2011, Komsomolskaya Pravda published a letter addressed to Defense Minister Anatoly Serdyukov on May 16, signed by Nikita Mikhalkov. "This is a private letter that I wrote to the Defense Minister. I don't know how it got out of the military department and into the media. I won't comment on the letter, I want to understand what the reaction to this appeal will be," the film director said. On May 24, Nikita Mikhalkov himself, in the pages of the Izvestia newspaper, rejected both the reports that they were going to deprive him of his flashing light in any case, and the suggestion that his resignation as chairman of the Public Council was an "elegant way" to get rid of criticism in the blogosphere. He stated: "There were and are no formal grounds for removing the flashing light. In all these years, my driver has not had a single complaint from the traffic police. In any case, the flashing light is not due to Mikhalkov, but to the chairman of the Public Council. I will hand it in along with my license." He also emphasized that he finds it hard to imagine that the "hysterical campaign in the blogosphere" could influence the decisions of the Ministry of Defense: "It’s not the flashing light that irritates them, but my personality. If there is no flashing light, they will come up with a wagtail, a pihalka, or anything else. They are making up stories about me scattering 'combat vipers' around the estate.". Mikhalkov also admitted that due to the lack of a flashing light, he might be able to do much less. "Another question is who will benefit from this," he said in an interview.

On May 29, Mikhalkov's car — now without a flashing light — was filmed repeatedly driving into the oncoming lane. After the video was made public, the Road Safety Department initiated an investigation into the incident.

== Filmography ==
Year	Film					
Year	Film	Director	Screenwriter	Producer	Role	Notes
1959	The sun is shining on everyone				schoolboy	first movie role; not in the credits
1960	Clouds over Borsk				Petya, "Father Nikon" in a school anti-religious skit	
1961	The Adventures of Krosh				Vadim, Igor's friend	
1961	My friend, Kolka!				schoolboy	not in the credits
1964	Walking the Streets of Moscow				Nikolay	
1964	Wick No. 29 (the plot is "Not according to the instructions")				subway passenger	short film
1965	A year like life				Jules	
1965	Roll call				Sergey Borodin	
1966	A joke				A. P., the narrator in his youth	short film
1966	Not a good day.				Nikita	
1967	Stars and soldiers				Glazunov, ensign	
1967	War and Peace				Episode	He was approved for the role of Petya Rostov, but starred in only one scene — horseback riding during a hunt, after which he did not participate in the film; there is no credits
1967	Devochka i veshchi	✓	✓			short film, term paper
1967	And this lips, and green eyes…	✓	✓			short film, term paper
1968	And I Go Home	✓	✓			short film, term paper
1969	The noble Nest				Prince Nelidov	
1969	The Song of Manshuk				Valery Yezhov	
1969	The Red Tent				Boris Chukhnovsky	
1970	Sports, sports, sports				Kiribeevich, an oprichnik	
1970	Risk		✓			
1970	A quiet day at the end of the war	✓				short film, thesis
1970	Wick No. 94 (the plot of "Dear words")	✓				short film
1970	Wick No. 97 (the plot of "Fly in the Ointment")	✓				short film
1970	Wick No. 98 (the plot is "Unconscious")	✓				short film
1972	The stationmaster				Minsky, the hussar	
1972	Chocolate		✓			a short promotional film
1972	Wick No. 125 (the plot "Victim of hospitality")	✓				short film
1974	Wick No. 148 (the "Object Lesson" story)	✓				short film
1974	Wick No. 150 (the plot "Let's start a new life")	✓				short film
1974	At Home Among Strangers	✓	✓		Alexander Brylov, ataman of the gang, former captain	Feature directorial debut
1976	A Slave of Love	✓			Ivan, the revolutionary underground worker	
1977	An Unfinished Piece for Mechanical Piano	✓	✓		Nikolai Ivanovich Triletsky, doctor, Sashenka's brother	
1977	Trans-Siberian Express		✓			
1977	Hate		✓			
1978	Siberiade				Alexey Ustyuzhanin, son of Nikolai and Anastasia	
1978	Five Evenings	✓	✓			
1979	A Few Days from the Life of I.I. Oblomov	✓	✓		a distinguished gentleman in St. Petersburg	not in the credits as an actor
1981	Family Relations	✓			waiter	
1981	Two voices				Sergey Nikolaevich Baklazhanov, Professor, library reader	
1981	Portrait of the artist's wife				Boris Petrovich, deputy director of the boarding house, Nina's boyfriend	
1981	The Hound of the Baskervilles				Sir Henry Baskerville, nephew and heir of Sir Charles, the last of the Baskervilles	
1982	Station for Two				Andrey, the conductor	
1982	Traffic police Inspector				Valentin Pavlovich Trunov, Director of the Service Station	
1982	Flying in a dream and in reality				Director on a night shoot (cameo)	
1983	Without Witness	✓	✓			
1983	250 grams — radioactive testament				Max Seman, architect	
1984	A cruel romance				Sergey Sergeevich Paratov, hereditary nobleman, owner of a shipping company	
1986	My favorite clown		✓			
1987	Dark Eyes	✓	✓			
1988	Wick No. 310 (the plot of "The Forgotten Tapes?")	✓				short film
1989	The Lonely Hunter		✓			
1990	Hitchhiking	✓	✓	✓		It was made with money from an advertising contract with the Fiat concern
1990	Under the Northern Lights					
1991	Humiliated and insulted				Prince Valkovsky	
1991	Close to Eden	✓	✓		Cyclist on a Chinese city street (cameo)	
1992	The beautiful stranger				The Colonel	
1993	Remembering Chekhov	✓				The film was not completed
1993	Anna: 6 - 18	✓	✓	✓	cameo	documentary film-biography
1994	Burnt by the Sun	✓	✓	✓	Sergey Petrovich Kotov, Division Commander	
1995	A sentimental trip to my homeland. Music of Russian painting	✓	✓	✓	cameo	documentary and educational series
1996	The Auditor				Anton Antonovich Draughtsman-Dmukhanovsky, mayor	
1996	Russian project				Senior cosmonaut	social advertising of the ORT TV channel
1997	Schizophrenia				cameo	
1998	The Barber of Siberia	✓	✓	✓	Emperor Alexander III	
2000	Faith, hope, blood				one of the roles	The film was not completed
2000	A tender age			✓		
2003	Russians without Russia	✓				documentary and nonfiction film
2003	Father	✓	✓	✓	cameo	documentary film-biography
2003	Mother	✓	✓	✓	cameo	documentary film-biography
2004	72 meters			✓		
2005	Zhmurki				Sergey Mikhailovich ("Mikhalych"), crime boss	
2005	Persona Non Grata				Oleg, Deputy Minister of Foreign Affairs of Russia	
2005	The State Counsellor			✓	Gleb Georgievich Pozharsky, General	
2006	It doesn't hurt.				Sergey Sergeevich	
2007	Stupid fat rabbit				Nikita Sergeevich	
2007	1612			✓		
2007	55	✓	✓	✓	cameo	documentary and nonfiction film
2007	12	✓	✓	✓	Nikolai, foreman of the jury	
2010	Burnt by the Sun 2: Exodus	✓	✓	✓	Sergey Petrovich Kotov, former division commander, penal officer	
2011	Burnt by the Sun 3: The Citadel	✓	✓	✓	Sergey Petrovich Kotov, Lieutenant General	
2012	House on the side of the road			✓		
2012	After school				cameo	
2013	Legend No. 17			✓		
2013	Poddubny			✓		
2013	A foreign land	✓			cameo	documentary and nonfiction film
2014	Own land	✓			cameo	documentary and nonfiction film
2014	Sunstroke	✓	✓	✓		
2016	Crew			✓		
2017	Upward movement			✓		
2018	Coach			✓		
2019	Т-34			✓		
2020	The story of an unreleased movie	✓	✓	✓	cameo	a documentary film about Mikhalkov's 1993 but unreleased film Remembering Chekhov
2020	Streltsov			✓		
2020	The Silver Skates			✓		
2020	Fire			✓		
2021	A couple from the future			✓		
2021	World Champion			✓		
2023	The Righteous One			✓		
2023	The Bremen Town Musicians			✓		
2024	The Wizard of Oz. Yellow brick road			✓		
2024	The Prophet. The story of Alexander Pushkin			✓		
2025	The Kraken			✓		

=== Text-to-speech ===
- 1965 — Full Circle (radio play by Andrei Tarkovsky) — Claude Hope, an officer of the British Navy
- 2004 — Earthly and Heavenly (episode No. 10 "Summer of the Lord") — voiceover
- 2006 — Quiet Don — voiceover
- 2025 — Father 2. Grandfather — voice-over text

Reads the voiceover translation of foreign lines in his films:

- 1987 — Black eyes
- 1990 — Hitchhiking
- 1991 — Urga — the territory of love
- 1998 — The Siberian Barber

=== Song performance ===
In the film "I'm walking through Moscow," Mikhalkov performed a song based on the words of Gennady Shpalikov ("I'll spread a white sail over the boat...").

In the film "Cruel Romance" he performed the romance "And the Gypsy Goes" based on the poems of Rudyard Kipling..

In his 2014 film "Sunstroke," Mikhalkov performed the romance "Not for Me" with the Kuban State Academic Cossack Choir under the direction of Anatoly Arefyev. It was this song that Stanislav Lyubshin's character tried and could not remember in one of the scenes of the film "Five Evenings"..

=== Documentaries and TV shows ===
- 2010 — Nikita Mikhalkov. Sami with a mustache (Channel One)
- 2010 — Nikita Mikhalkov. Territory of Love (TV Center)
- 2015 — Nikita Mikhalkov. A stranger among his own (Channel One)
- 2020 — Nikita Mikhalkov. Upward movement (Channel One)
- 2020 — Portrait of an Epoch by Nikita Mikhalkov (Mir)
- 2023 — I don't see an actor, but a feature of being (Culture).

== Family ==
- Maternal great-grandfather: Vasily Surikov (1848–1916), artist.
- Maternal grandfather - Pyotr Konchalovsky (1876–1956), painter, People's Artist of the RSFSR (1946).
- Father: Sergei Mikhalkov (1913–2009), children's writer. Hero of Socialist Labor (1973), Honored Artist of the RSFSR (1967).
- Mother: Natalia Konchalovskaya (1903–1988), poet and translator.
- Half-sister - Ekaterina Alekseevna Semenova (Bogdanova) (1931–2019), Natalia Konchalovskaya's daughter from her first marriage. She was married to the writer Yulian Semyonov (1931–1993).
- Niece: Olga Semenova (born 1967), journalist.
- Elder brother - Andrei Mikhalkov-Konchalovsky (born 1937), film director, People's Artist of the RSFSR (1980).
- Nephew - Yegor Konchalovsky (born 1966), film director.

Wives and children

- First wife (1966–1971) — Anastasia Vertinskaya (born 1944), actress, People's Artist of the RSFSR (1988). Son — Stepan (born 1966), producer and restaurateur. Grandchildren: Alexandra (born 1992), Vasily (born 1999), Pyotr (born 2002), Luka (born 2017). Great-grandchildren: Fyodor Skvortsov (born 2018) and Nikolay Skvortsov (born 2019), sons of granddaughter Alexandra.
- Second wife (1973 — present) — Tatyana Mikhalkova (born 1947). Daughter — Anna (born 1974), actress, TV presenter; People's Artist of the Russian Federation (2025). Grandchildren: Andrey Bakov (born 2000), Sergey Bakov (born 2001), Lydiya Bykova (род. 2013). Son — Artyom (born 1975), film director and actor. Grandchildren: Natalia (born 2002) and Alexander (born 2020). Great-grandson Mikhail Stepanenko (born 2024), son of granddaughter Natalia. Daughter — Nadezhda (born 1986), actress, film director, TV presenter. Grandchildren: Nina (born 2011), Ivan (born 2013).
