= Couplets (cabaret) =

Witty songs performed in cabaret settings

Couplets (German: Couplets, Polish: kuplety, Spanish: cuplés) were wittily ambiguous, political, or satirical songs in a number of European countries, usually performed in cabaret settings, usually with refrains, often used as a transition between two cabaret numbers. Couplets could also be independent stage numbers. A coupletist (Russian: куплетист, romanized: kupletist) is a poet, singer, or actor who specializes in couplets.

With sarcasm and humor, coupletists take on political dignitaries, the prevailing zeitgeist and lifestyle, in short, "all of the world's madness". Friedrich Wolf called the couplet "the direct involvement of the audience in the game" (German: die unmittelbare Einbeziehung des Zuschauers in das Spiel).

Samuel Esterowicz recalled:

"In the cinemas, besides films there would also appear the touring so-called kupletists (singers of topical, satirical songs) – Vasily Pravdin, Gregory Marmeladov and others. Kolya [Shenyuk] and I enjoyed the kupletists very much and, buying their librettos, zealously studied their soliloquies in order to recite them with feeling to our ladies. ... It was supper time and all of us children sat at the table, mama pouring tea from the samovar boiling on the table. ... I, holding in my hand the libretto of a kupletist, was reciting one of his soliloquies at the top of my voice. Unable to stand my noise, mama entreated me to quiet down and when this did not help, she tore the libretto from my hands and stuck it into the pipe of the samovar, where the fire consumed it.

The Viennese couplet is a little song found in the farces and comedies of Viennese popular theater. The couplet interrupts the action on stage, is directly addressed to the audience and has reflections on various subjects often unrelated to the plot. While the couplet is sung, "dramatic time" stands still. The actor leaves his role to act as the writer's accomplice, interacting directly with the audience. The actor uses a send-up of his personal problems to make general comments on social and political grievances or human character flaws.

Michael Tilson Thomas was "... amused by the sheer amount of improvised satirical and topical couplets [created by his grandparents Boris and Bessie Thomashevsky] ... the modernity of the Thomashefsky improvisations a century ago in the Yiddish theater was remarkably reminiscent of those on Saturday Night Live."

In Yiddish theater, the kuplét was "the comedian's almost obligatory comic patter song." It duplicates vaudeville's intense rapport between performer and audience.

"For a contemporary example, one verse of the naughty kuplét of Money, Love and Shame, sung by a clever comedian in Tel Aviv in 1975, makes fun of Brezhnev, to the delight of an audience of recent immigrants from Russia ... Jacob Jacobs [leans] over to the audience, in the course of a kuplét, to commiserate with someone in the first row on his Galician accent – always good for a laugh. Another of his perennial routines is to sing a verse about a man who is cuckolded or impotent, peer out into the audience, and ask someone why his wife is laughing so hard.

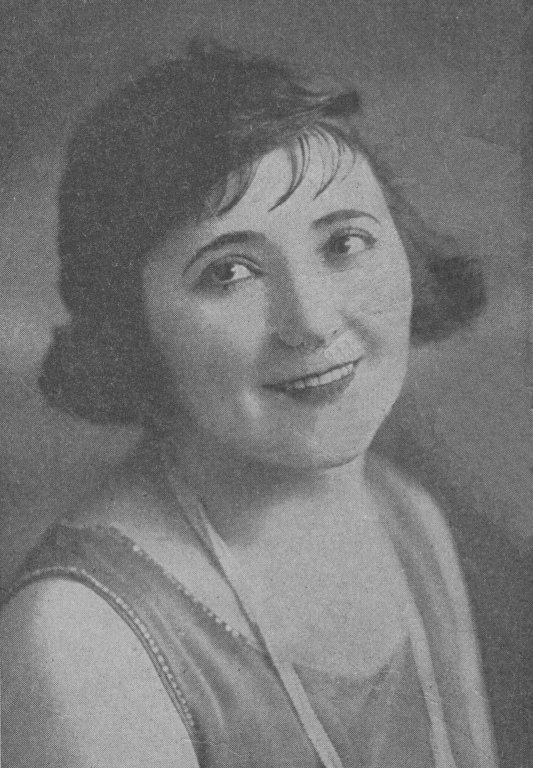
Nellie Casman, 1923

== Notable artists identified as kupletists ==
- Pesach Burstein (1896–1986)
- Ben-Zion Witler (1907–1961)
- Boris Thomashevsky (1868–1939)
- Shloyme Prizament (1889–1973)
- Leo Fuchs (1911–1994)
- Otto Reutter (1870–1931)
- Nellie Casman (1896–1984) (one of the few female coupletists)
- Maria Conesa (1892–1978)
- Constantin Tănase (1880–1945)
- estrada duet of Pavel Rudakov (1915–1993) & Veniamin Nechayev (1915–1987), which was popular in the times of the Khrushchev Thaw.
- Matti Jurva (1898–1943) the most popular coupletist in the interwar Finland, who performed couplets with tap dancing
- Buba Kastorsky, "original coupletist hailing from Odesa", a fictional character in Soviet adventure films about The Elusive Avengers starring Boris Sichkin

== See also ==
- Cuplé
- Chastushka
