= Treasure Island (disambiguation) =

Treasure Island is an 1883 novel by Robert Louis Stevenson.

Treasure Island may also refer to:

== Film and television ==
- Treasure Island (1918 film), a film by Chester and Sidney Franklin
- Treasure Island (1920 film), a film featuring Shirley Mason
- Treasure Island (1934 film), a film starring Jackie Cooper and Wallace Beery
- Treasure Island (1938 film), a Soviet film by Vladimir Vaynshtok
- Treasure Island (1950 film), a Disney film starring Bobby Driscoll and Robert Newton
- Treasure Island (1966 miniseries), a German miniseries by Wolfgang Liebeneiner
- Treasure Island (1972 film), a film starring Orson Welles
- Treasure Island (1973 film), a film released by Filmation
- Treasure Island (1977 TV series), a British adaptation
- Treasure Island (1978 TV series), a Japanese anime television series, known as Takarajima in Japanese
- Treasure Island (1982 film), a Soviet film
- Treasure Island (1986 film), a Chilean-French film
- Treasure Island (1988 film), a Soviet animated musical film released by Kievnauchfilm
- Treasure Island (1990 film), a film starring Christian Bale and Charlton Heston
- Muppet Treasure Island, a 1996 adaptation featuring the Muppets
- Treasure Island (TV franchise), a reality television franchise that debuted in New Zealand in 1997 and has Australian and Irish editions
- Treasure Island (1995 film), a film directed by Ken Russell
- Treasure Island (1999 film), a film featuring Kevin Zegers and Jack Palance
- Treasure Island (1999 independent film), a film by Scott King
- Treasure Island (2012 TV series), a British adaptation broadcast on Sky1
- Treasure Island (2026 TV series), a British and American adaptation for MGM+ and Paramount+
- "Treasure Island", episode 6 of the sixth season of Alvin and the Chipmunks (1983)
- "Treasure Island", an episode of Dora the Explorer

== Places ==
=== United States ===
- Treasure Island, San Francisco, California
- Treasure Island, Florida
- Treasure Island, Delaware River island and former home of Treasure Island Scout Reservation
- Treasure Island, part of North Bay Village in Miami, Florida
- Reach Island, or Treasure Island, an island in Washington
- Discovery Island (Bay Lake), island and former attraction at Walt Disney World in Bay Lake, Florida that was originally opened under the name Treasure Island

=== Other places ===
- Treasure Island (Ontario), a small island in Lake Mindemoya, Ontario, Canada
- Zhenbao Island or Treasure Island, in the Ussuri River, China, on the border with Russia
- Isla de la Juventud or Treasure Island, Cuba
- Treasure Island (Fiji), a coral island and resort in the Mamanuca Islands

== Music ==
- Treasure Island (Keith Jarrett album), 1974
- Treasure Island (Nick Harper album)
- Treasure Island, an EP by Thomas Zwijsen
- "Treasure Island", a 1977 instrumental by Bob James from BJ4
- "Treasure Island", a 1989 song by Steven Curtis Chapman from More to This Life
- "Treasure Island", a 1992 song by Running Wild from Pile of Skulls
- "Treasure Island", a 2011 song by Iggy Azalea from Ignorant Art
- "Treasure Island", a 2011 song by Charlotte OC
- "Treasure Island", a 2017 song by Alestorm from No Grave But the Sea
- "Treasure Island", a 2018 song by Azealia Banks

== Other uses ==
- Treasure Island (play), a 1915 play by Jules Eckert Goodman
- Treasure Island (store), a former J. C. Penney store
- Treasure Island (1981 video game), an arcade game
- Treasure Island (1984 video game), a home computer game
- Treasure Islands: Tax Havens and the Men Who Stole the World, 2011, by Nicholas Shaxson
- Treasure Island Hotel and Casino, Las Vegas, Nevada, US
- Treasure Island Media, gay pornography studio, San Francisco, US
- Treasure Island Resort & Casino, Red Wing, Minnesota, US
- Mt. Olympus Water & Theme Park or Treasure Island Resort, Wisconsin Dells, US
- Treasure Island Foods, a chain of grocery stores in the Chicago area, US

== See also ==
- The Secret of Treasure Island, a 1938 Columbia Pictures serial film
- Five on a Treasure Island, a 1942 children's novel by Enid Blyton
- Treasure Planet (1982 film), a 1982 Bulgarian animated science fiction film
- Treasure Island in Outer Space, a 1987 Italian science fiction television miniseries
- The Legends of Treasure Island, a 1993–1995 British animated TV series based on the novel
- Treasure Planet, a 2002 American animated science fiction adventure film
- Pirates of Treasure Island, a 2006 American comedy-drama film loosely based on the novel
- Treasure Island Dizzy, a 1988 computer game
- Return to Treasure Island
- Shin Takarajima
- Takarajima (disambiguation)
- Treasury Islands
