= Ostrov Sokrovishch =

Ostrov Sokrovishch or Ostrov Sokrovišč (the Romanization of the word Остров Сокровищ) may refer to:

- Treasure Island (1988 film), a Soviet animated musical film released by Kievnauchfilm
- Treasure Island (1982 film), a Soviet film
- Treasure Island (1971 film), a Soviet adventure film
- Treasure Island (1938 film), a Soviet film by Vladimir Vaynshtok

== See also ==
- Treasure Island (disambiguation)
