= Love and Pigeons =

1985 Soviet Union film

- Directed by: Vladimir Menshov
- Written by: Vladimir Gurkin
- Starring: Aleksandr Mikhailov; Nina Doroshina; Lyudmila Gurchenko
- Cinematography: Yuriy Nevskiy
- Edited by: R. Pesetskaya
- Music by: Valentin Levashov
- Production company: Mosfilm
- Release date: 7 January 1985
- Running time: 107 minutes
- Country: Soviet Union
- Language: Russian

Love and Pigeons (Russian: Любовь и голуби, romanized: Lübov’ i golubi) is a Soviet romantic comedy-drama, filmed in 1984, at the Mosfilm film studio by director Vladimir Menshov, whose previous film Moscow Does Not Believe In Tears won an Academy Award for Best Foreign Language Film. It is based on a script written by theater actor Vladimir Gurkin, based on his own life experiences. The script is based on his play of the same name, written in 1981.

The film was the leader of Soviet distribution in 1984 and sold over 44.5 million tickets.

== Plot ==
Vasily Kuzyakin (Alexander Mikhailov), a forestry worker who is fond of pigeon breeding, lives in the countryside with his wife Nadezhda (Nina Doroshina) and their three children: eldest daughter Lyudka (Yanina Lisovskaya), who left for the city, but returned to the village after an unsuccessful marriage; son Lyonka (Igor Lyakh), a cheerful fellow who loved technology; and the youngest daughter, Olya (Lada Sizonenko), the favorite of her father.

Nadezhda, a woman who was rather grumpy, considers her husband frivolous because he spends family money to buy expensive pigeons and constantly reproaches him for these purchases. An elderly couple lives next door to the Kuzyakins — baba Shura (Natalya Tenyakova) and uncle Mitya (Sergey Yursky), in whose family there are constant conflicts.

Uncle Mitya is a bit of an alcoholic, but his wife tries to keep a tight grip on him. Therefore, he uses every opportunity to keep his drinking secret from his strict wife (e.g. he arranges an impromptu funeral feast for her, although she did not die).

One day Vasily gets an industrial injury and leaves on a trip to the seaside for treatment. At the resort, he meets Raisa Zakharovna (Lyudmila Gurchenko), an employee of the personnel department of the forestry enterprise in which Vasily works. This city dweller, a flighty and exalted lady, fascinates Vasily with her amazing stories about psychics, telekinesis, astral bodies, and humanoids. What takes place is a holiday romance.

As a result, Vasily leaves the family for his new lover, which they tell his wife and children about in a letter. After reading the letter, Nadezhda has a tantrum. On the same stormy evening, Raisa Zakharovna herself pays a visit to the Kuzyakins, hoping to find an agreeable arrangement and settle everything in peace. Raisa tells Nadezhda that she is an employee of the personnel department, but does not give details. The overwrought Nadezhda talks to her about her errant husband. However, after finding out who she is, Nadezhda causes a scandal and rushes at Raisa with her fists. Ultimately, Raisa leaves with nothing.

After that conflict, Nadezhda sinks into depression. The children are also offended by their father, especially Lyonka, who threatens to kill him as soon as he sees him. At the same time, the life together of Raisa and Vasily living together in harmony does not work out because they are people of "different social strata." Furthermore, Vasily misses his family. As a result, he leaves Raisa.

For Nadezhda it is the third day, she lies sad on the bed; the children, Uncle Mitya and Baba Shura are trying to comfort her. Lyudka was going to leave in a few days for the city. However, they get into a quarrel with their mother, as Nadezhda remembers her how she came to her from the city. As a result, she apologizes to her daughter for yelling at her. Olya asks Lyudka not to leave as all three of them burst into tears.

Uncle Mitya jokingly said that there would be a flood due to all their tears. Baba Shura mentioned how much he "drank blood" from her. The four of them pounce on him with accusations, go out into the street, and happen to see Vasily come. A big scandal comes about as Vasily leaves. Nadezhda asks Baba Shura to tell him to come to the river. They secretly meet at this hideaway for 2 months. Vasily finds out that Nadezhda is pregnant and decides to return home. They climb into the dovecote and see that Lyonka has returned from college. Nadezhda goes out into the street, Lyonka told her that he was being taken to the army, and he asks her to call his father. The film ends with Lyonka being sent off to the army while launching his pigeons into the sky.

== Production ==
- The play and the film are based on the real story of the family of Vasily and Nadezhda Kuzyakin, who lived in the homeland of the author of the script of the film Vladimir Gurkin — in the city of Cheremkhovo (Irkutsk region). The prototypes of Mitya and Shura were Gurkin's grandparents.
- Vladimir Menshov saw the play quite by accident. When Nina Doroshina was playing the role of Nadya in the Sovremennik theatre, he decided to make a movie.
- Shura – Natalya Tenyakova and Mitya - Sergei Yursky are husband and wife in real life.
- Alexander Mikhailov initially refused the role. Nikolai Lavrov, Boris Morchkov, Viktor Bortsov and Sergey Yursky, who was later approved for the role of Uncle Mitya, also auditioned for the role of Vasily Kuzyakin.
- Lyubov Polishchuk unsuccessfully auditioned for the role of Nadia, and Natalia Kustinskaya's sample was rejected by the artistic expert board.
- The role of Raisa Zakharovna was first offered to Tatiana Doronina (refused), then to Olga Yakovleva, Vera Alentova also auditioned.
- In the script Nadya is a middle-aged woman and Shura is an old, retired woman, whereas in real life Nina Doroshina who played Nadya is 10 years older than Natalya Tenyakova who played Shura in the film. At the time of filming Nina Doroshina was 50 years old and Natalya Tenyakova was 40.
- The film was shot in the summer in Karelia — on the outskirts of the city of Medvezhyegorsk, in a house on the bank of the river Kumsa. A private house No. 12 on Nizhnyaya Street on the outskirts of the city, where the main scenes of the film were shot, was demolished after a fire in 2011, a cottage was built in its place, in 2018 the owner of the house restored a dovecote on the same place where the film was shot.
- The shooting of the swimming episode of Raisa Zakharovna and Vasily was conducted in November in Batumi and Kobuleti (Adjara, Georgia). The water temperature was 14 degrees C.
- During the filming of the episode when Vasily falls out of the door of his house into the sea, Alexander Mikhailov almost died. The actor fell from the pier in Kobuleti, divers undressed him under the water, and he surfaced next to Gurchenko already in his underpants. During filming underwater, the diver could not take off his tie for a long time; Mikhailov almost drowned, the tie had to be cut.
- In the episode when Vasily secretly looks into the window of his house, the film "Moscow does not believe in tears", also shot by Vladimir Menshov, is on TV.
- During the filming of the episode with the "blossoming tree", equipment for magic tricks was used — a cane from which flowers jump out. The magician invited to the shooting attached ten such canes to an ordinary tree, and although only seven of them worked at the same time, the shot was made on the first take.
- Eduard Uspensky wrote two songs for the film. One of them, "Burning Southern Tango", is performed in the movie by Sergei Menakhin. The second song, "Come home, men!" (music by Grigory Gladkov), was not included by the director in the film.
- The episode in which Raisa Zakharovna and Vasily do exercises on trainers was filmed at the Zander Institute of Mechanotherapy in Essentuki.
- In 2011, a monument to the heroes of the film "Love and Doves" was erected in Cheremkhov (sculptor — Karim Mukhamadeev).

== Cast ==
- Alexander Mikhailov as Vasily Kuzyakin
- Nina Doroshina as Nadya, Vasily's wife
- Lyudmila Gurchenko as Raisa Zakharovna
- Yana Lisovskaya as Luda, Vasily's eldest daughter
- Lada Sizonenko as Olya, Vasily's youngest daughter
- Igor Lyakh as Leonid, Vasily's son
- Sergei Yursky as uncle Mitya
- Natalya Tenyakova as old woman Shura, uncle Mitya's wife
- Vladimir Menshov as leading cadres

== The film crew ==
- Screenwriter — Vladimir Gurkin
- Director — Vladimir Menshov
- Director of Photography — Yuri Nevsky
- Production designer — Felix Yasyukevich
- Composer — Valentin Levashov
- Lyrics — Eduard Uspensky
- Sound engineer — Raisa Margacheva
- Film editing — R. Pesetskaya
- Makeup — E. Evseeva
- Costume designer — Natalia Moneva
- Sound director — Eldar Shakhverdiyev
- Conductor — Emin Khachaturian
- Production manager — Alexander Litvinov

== Awards ==
The Golden Rook Award at the Torremolinos International Comedy Film Festival in 1985.

MTV Russia Movie Awards in 2009, nomination "Best Soviet Film".

== Premieres ==
- January 7, 1985 — USSR.
- June 6, 1986 — Finland.
- October 2, 1986 — Hungary

== Video releases ==
VHS — publisher "Close—up" (1997), VCD on two discs — publisher "Lizard Digital Video" (1997), DVD5 (without restoration, mono) - publisher "Close-up" (2003), DVD9 — publisher "Close-up" (restoration of sound and pictures) (2007), Blu-ray — publisher "Close-up" (restoration of sound and pictures) (2010).

== Radio and theater productions ==
Year of the first theatrical production — 1982, radio — 1986.

Author: Vladimir Gurkin

Performer: Artists of the Sovremennik Theater

Radio performance of the Sovremennik Theater based on the play by Vladimir Gurkin.

Directed by Valery Fokin

=== Cast ===
- N. Doroshina
- G. Petrova
- V. Nishchenko
- M. Sitko
- V. Gurkin as narrator
