= Natalya Tenyakova =

Soviet and Russian actress (1944–2025)

Natalya Tenyakova PAR
- Наталья Тенякова
- Tenyakova in 1967
- Born: Natalya Maksimovna Tenyakova; 3 July 1944; Leningrad, Russian SFSR, USSR
- Died: 18 June 2025 (aged 80); Moscow, Russia
- Occupation: Actress
- Years active: 1966–2025
- Spouse: Sergei Yursky (m. 1970; died 2019)

Natalya Maksimovna Tenyakova (Russian: Наталья Максимовна Теняко́ва; 3 July 1944 – 18 June 2025) was a Soviet and Russian actress of theater and cinema. She was People's Artist of the Russian Federation (1994), Laureate of the Golden Mask Award (1995), and the Stanislavsky Prize (2005).

== Life and career ==
Natalya Tenyakova was born in Leningrad in 1944. She graduated from the Leningrad State Institute of Theater, Music and Cinematography (LGITMiK) (Boris Sohn's course). Her fellow students were Olga Antonova, Lev Dodin, Victor Kostetskiy, Sergei Nadporozhsky, Leonid Mozgovoy, Vladimir Tykke, other masters of theater and cinema.

After graduation she was accepted into the troupe of the Baltic House Festival Theatre, where she made her debut as Polly Peachum in The Threepenny Opera (1966).

She was in Georgy Natanson's film Older Sister, released in 1966, in one of the main roles.

In 1967, Tenyakova became an actress of the Leningrad Bolshoi Drama Theater.

As of 1979, Natalia Tenyakova worked at the Mossovet Theater, where she also became one of the leading actresses. In 1988, at the invitation of Oleg Yefremov, she moved to the Chekhov Moscow Art Theater.

=== Personal life and death ===
Tenyakova was married to director Lev Dodin. She later married actor Sergei Yursky, with whom she had a daughter, Daria Yurskaya, in 1973.

Tenyakova died on 18 June 2025, at the age of 80.

== Filmography ==
- Older Sister (1966) as Lydia
- The Green Carriage (1967) as Varvara Asenkova
- Our Friends (1968) as Antonina Staroselskaya
- Thunderstorm over Belaya (1968) as Sasha Vikhrova
- Death of Wazir Mukhtar (TV, 1969) as Thaddeus Bulgarin's wife
- Love and Pigeons (1984) as old woman Shura
- Investigation Held by ZnaToKi (1985) as Yevdokia Matveyevna Stolnikova
- Love and Pigeons (1985) as old woman Shura
- Chernov / Chernov (1990) as Chernov's wife
- Chekhov and Co. (1998) as Dasha
- Fathers and Sons (TV, 2008) as Bazarov's mother
- A Frenchman (2019) as Maria Obrezkova
