= Yuliya Menshova =

Russian actress and TV show host

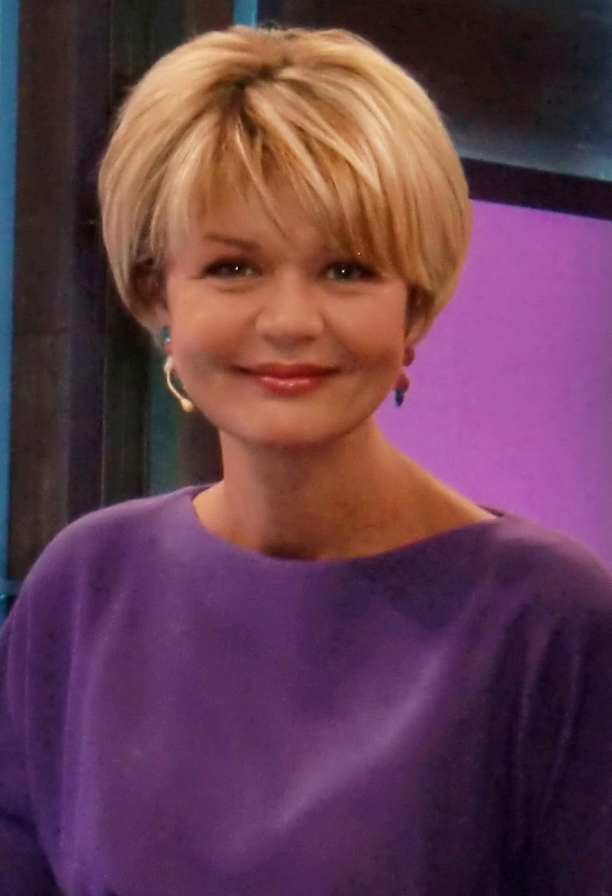
- Born: Yuliya Vladimirovna Menshova; July 28, 1969 (age 56); Moscow, RSFSR, USSR
- Occupations: Actress, TV host, producer
- Spouses: Igor Gordin (m. 1996; div. 2004) (m. 2008)
- Children: 2
- Awards: TEFI (1999)

Yuliya Vladimirovna Menshova (Russian: Ю́лия Влади́мировна Меньшо́ва; born July 28, 1969) is a Russian actress and TV show host. She is the winner of the Russian national television award TEFI in the Talk-show (1999).

== Biography ==
Yulia Menshova was born 28 July 1969 in Moscow, USSR (now Russia).

Followed in her parents' footsteps, graduating from a theatrical academy and going to work at the Moscow Art Theater. Over a period of four years, she played a dozen leading roles and appeared in several movies. But just as everything was going right in her acting career, Menshova stepped off the stage and into the television studio as an editor. Soon she was tapped to host her own show, which in time became TV6's prime attraction.

Has often been compared to Oprah Winfrey. Her women's talk show on TV6, Ya sama (I'll Do It Myself), regularly ruled the ratings. Her father, actor and director Vladimir Menshov, won the 1980 Oscar for Best Foreign Language Film for Moscow Does not Believe in Tears, in which her mother, actress Vera Alentova, played the leading role.

== Personal life ==
Menshova is married to actor Igor Gordin, with whom she has two children: Andrey Gordin (born 1997) and Taisia Gordina (born 2003).

== Selected filmography ==
- 1991: Act, Manya! as Manya>
- 1991: The Sukhovo-Kobylin's case as Nadezhda Naryshkina
- 1992: In That Area of Heaven... as Anya
- 1992: Silence as Nina
- 1993: If You Knew ... as Natalya Ivanovna
- 1993: Picky Groom as Katya
- 2007: Big Love as Kaleriya
