= In Order to Survive =

In Order to Survive may refer to:

- In Order to Survive (film), a 1992 Russian action film
- In Order to Survive (album), a 1995 album by William Parker
