= Anatoly Lobotsky =

Russian actor (1959–2025)

Anatoly Lobotsky PAR
- Анатолий Лобоцкий
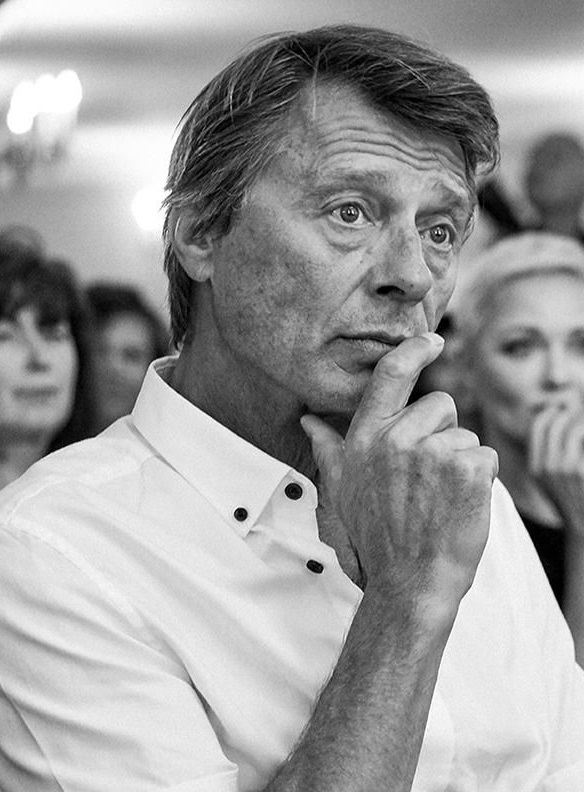
- Born: Anatoly Anatolyevich Lobotsky; 14 January 1959; Tambov, Tambov Oblast, Russian SFSR, USSR
- Died: 20 December 2025 (aged 66); Moscow, Russia
- Education: Moscow State Institute of Culture
- Occupation: Actor
- Years active: 1985–2025

Anatoly Anatolyevich Lobotsky (Russian: Анато́лий Анато́льевич Лобо́цкий; 14 January 1959 – 20 December 2025) was a Soviet and Russian stage and film actor. He is best known for role in Vladimir Menshov's 2000 drama film The Envy of Gods (as André). In 2013, he was awarded the title of People's Artist of the Russian Federation.

== Life and career ==
Anatoly Lobotsky was born on 14 January 1959 in Tambov, into a family of employees. The father was a journalist, the mother was a librarian.

Lobotsky died from lung cancer on 20 December 2025, at the age of 66. At the actor's funeral his colleague Vera Alentova passed away after feeling ill and being delivered into a hospital.

== Selected filmography ==
- Trifles of Life (1992) as Roman Bukreyev
- The Envy of Gods (2000) as André, French journalist
- Still Waters (2000) as Alexey Yozhikov
- Admiral (2008) as Count Chelyshev
- The Priest (2009) as Colonel Freigausen
- The Junior Team (2013) as Stanislav Mikhailovich Kostrov
- Champions (2014) as Vyacheslav Bykov
- Mata Hari (2017) as Monsieur Malle
- AK-47 (2020) as Colonel Glukhov

== Awards ==
- Merited Artist of the Russian Federation (1998)
- IX St. Petersburg All-Russian Film Festival — Best Actor (The Envy of Gods)
- People's Artist of the Russian Federation (2013)
- Order of Friendship (2019)
