= Komissarzhevskaya Theatre =

Theatre in Saint Petersburg, Russia

Coordinates: 59°56′5″N 30°20′0″E

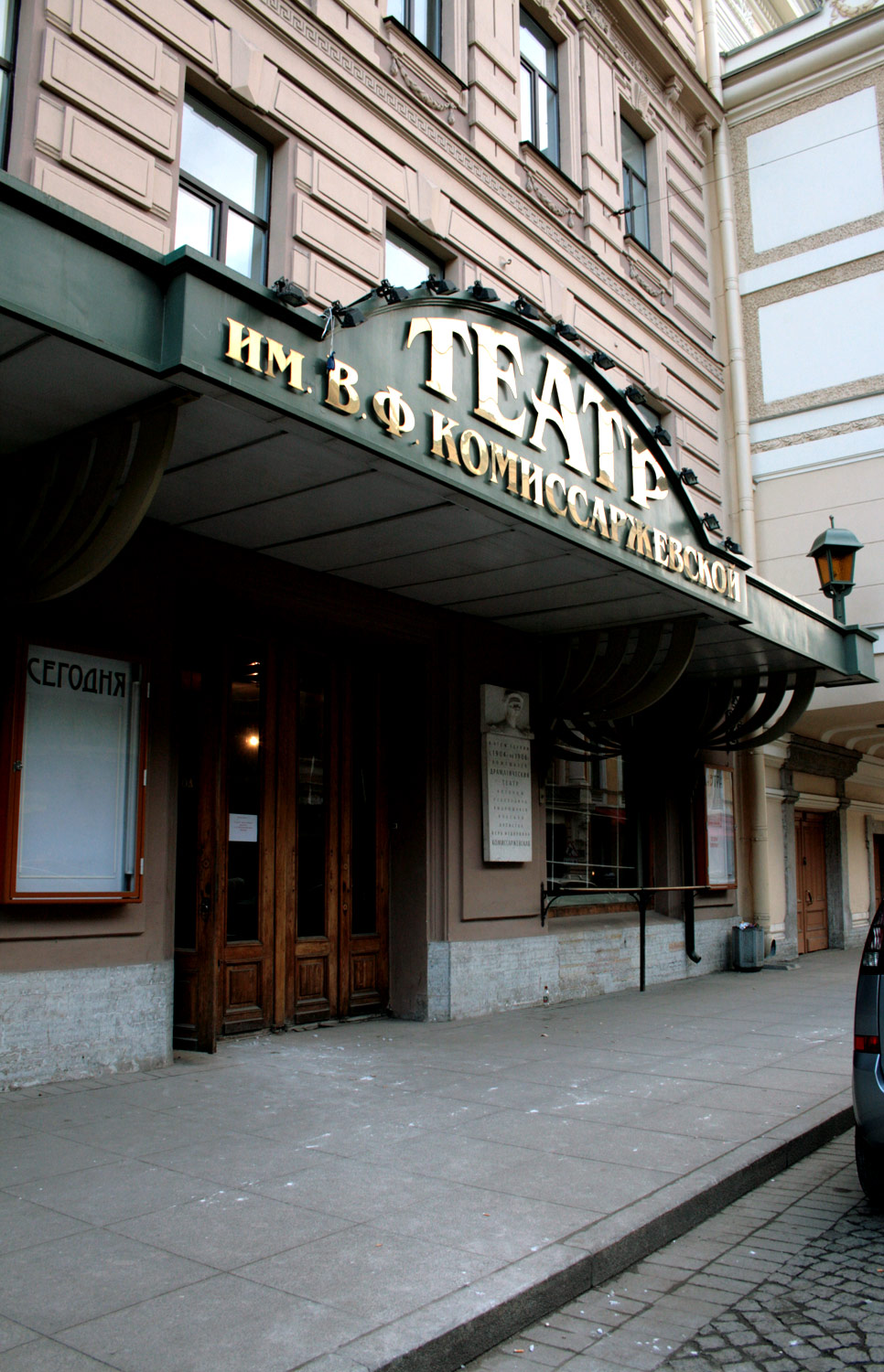
An Image of Komissarzhevskaya Theatre

The Komissarzhevskaya Theatre (Russian: Академический драматический театр имени В. Ф. Комиссаржевской) is a theatre in Saint Petersburg, Russia. It is named after Vera Komissarzhevskaya.

== History ==
It was founded in 1942 as the City Theatre (at the time, the city, then Leningrad, was besieged by the German army. It then became the Blockade Theatre, or, as it is sometimes translated, the Besieged Theatre). The company was legitimized as a drama theatre in 1943. It was renamed after V.F. Komissarzhevskaya in 1959, and granted academic status in 1994. It is located in the former “Passage Hall” of the elite department store The Passage.

The same building housed many theatre companies before 1942, most notably, the Komissarzhevskaya Theatre (Russian: Драматический театр В.Ф. Комиссаржевской), a private theatre under the directorship by V.F. Komissarzhevskaya herself, in 1904–1906 (this troupe operated in 1904–1909).

== Notable actors ==
- Boris Sohn (1948 - 1966)
- Vladimir Chestnokov (1948 - 1953)
- Alisa Freindlich (1957 - 1961)
- Sergei Boyarsky (1948 - 1976)
- Petr Shelokhonov (1973 - 1995)
- Viktor Ilichyov (1973 - 1975)
- Viktor Chistiakov (parodist) (1966 - 1971)
- Nikolai Boyarsky (1948 - 1982)
- Ivan I. Krasko (1965 - current)
- Galina Korotkevich (1962 - 2021†)
- Anatoli Khudoleev (1975 - current)
- Georgi Korolchuk (1970 - current)
- Tamara Abrosimova
- Yevgeniya Igumnova
- Sergey Byzgu
