= Igor Talkov Jr. =

Igor Talkov Jr. Игорь Игоревич Тальков
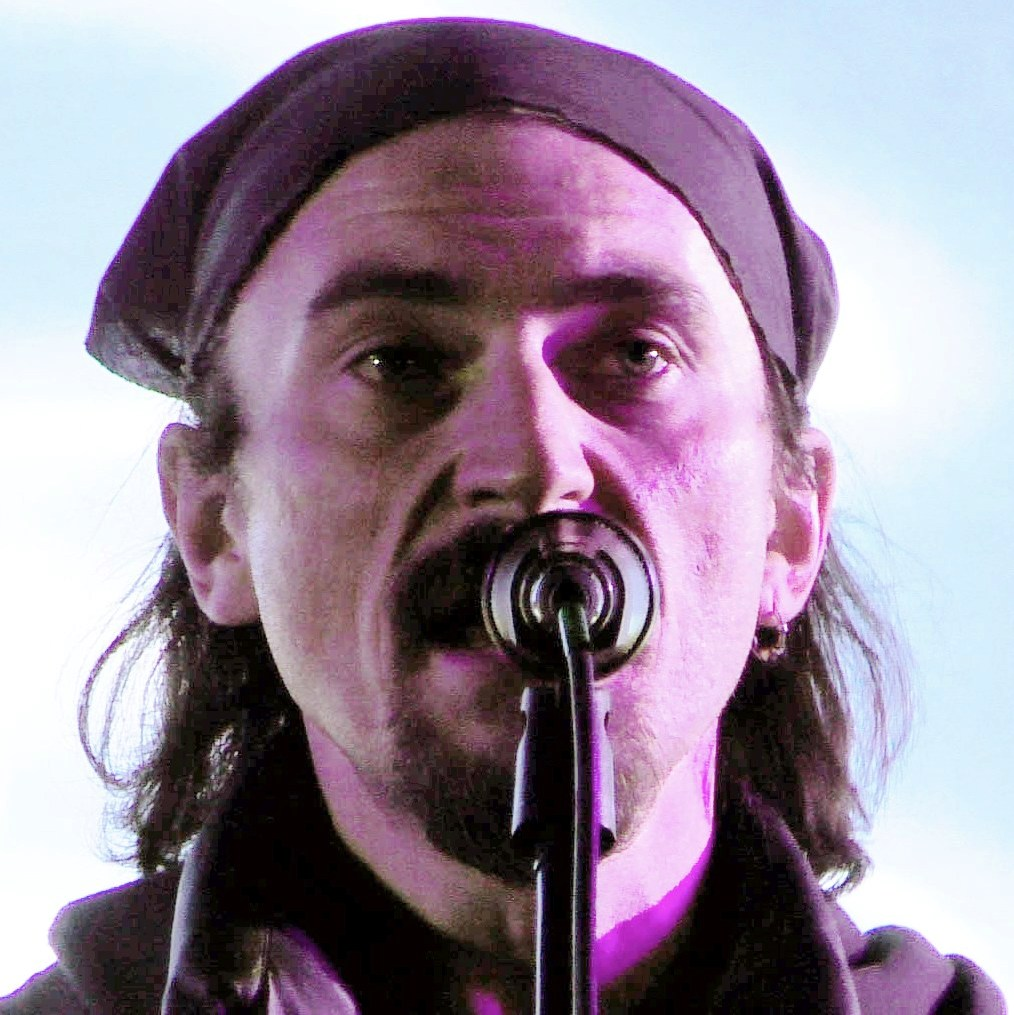
- Talkov Jr. in 2017

Background information
- Born: Igor Igorevich Talkov; October 14, 1981 (age 44); Moscow, USSR
- Genres: Rock
- Instruments: Guitar, keyboard
- Years active: 2001–present
- Member of: Mirlmir

Igor Igorevich Talkov (Russian: Игорь Игоревич Тальков; born October 14, 1981), also known as Igor Talkov Jr. or Igor Mirlmir Talkov, is a Russian musician and songwriter who founded the group Mirlmir. He is the son of Russian rock musician Igor Talkov.

== Biography ==
=== Early life and family ===
Talkov Jr. was born on October 14, 1981, in Moscow to singer and musician Igor Vladimirovich Talkov and Tatyana Ivanovna Talkova. His uncle is Russian artist Vladimir Talkov. Talkov Sr. took an active part in raising his son until 1987, when his rendition of the song "Chistye Prudy" brought Talkov Sr. into stardom. After Talkov Sr. saw an image of Alexander Nevsky holding a hammer and sickle in his son's textbook, he forbade Talkov Jr. from going to school and homeschooled him. Talkov Jr. was also sent to practice taekwondo. On October 6, 1991, Talkov Sr. was killed in St. Petersburg, Russia, leading Talkov Jr. to be raised by only his mother.

In 2005, Talkov Jr. married Anastasia Talkova, who kept his surname after a divorce. Talkov Jr. and Anastasia had no children. From 2008 to 2012, Talkov Jr. lived with a native of Luhansk, Ukraine named Svetlana. They had a daughter together named Varvara Talkova born on July 22, 2011. Varvara currently lives in Germany with her mother. Talkov Jr. and Svetlana married after Varvara's birth, and together they had their son Svyatoslav Talkov in 2013 and Myroslav Talkov in 2016.

=== Musical career ===
Talkov Jr. began writing his own songs at the age of 15, although in a 2011 interview he said he first started writing songs at 11. When he finished high school, he enrolled in the Joseph Backstein Institute of Contemporary Art in Moscow. Two months later, he dropped out and entered the Moscow State University of Culture and Arts, where he also didn't graduate.

His first major concert was in memory of his father in 2001, where he sang his father's song "I'll Be Back" at the State Kremlin Palace. In 2004, he performed his father's song Lifeboat. The next year, he released his solo album "We Must Live!" published by Nikitin Records.

In 2006, together with Russian artists Slide, Golden Age, Pascal, and other musicians, Talkov Jr. released an album called "Pure Works", where he sang his father's songs and some of his father's unreleased music. He led a tour of the album alongside Aziza.

In 2009, Talkov Jr. founded the band MirlmiR. He posted Mirlmir's songs on the Internet, distasteful of Russian recording studios. That same year, he began performing tribute concerts to his father every October 6 at Yubileyny Sports Palace where his father got shot. In 2019, he performed a concert in support of protesters in Arkhangelsk.

== Discography ==
Solo albums:

- 2005 – We Must Live!
1. Time Does Not Wait For Us
2. House
3. To Each His Own
4. Marathon
5. We Must Live!
6. Find Yourself
7. Our Sun
8. No Luck
9. Where Are The Answers?
10. Goodbye
11. Saint
12. Day Seven
13. Enough!

Other editions

- 2006 – Pure Works
- 2015 – New Era (Faith in Knowledge)

== Politics ==
Talkov Jr. is a member of the Communist Party of the Russian Federation. In 2019, he ran as a candidate for the Tula Oblast Duma, but his registration was cancelled two weeks later.

=== War in Ukraine ===
In 2014, Talkov Jr. released two songs, "Brotherly Peoples" and "Maidan", about the War in Donbas. In an interview with Gorlovka News, he claimed his homeland was Donbas and that he would perform in the region.
