= Vladlen Davydov =

Soviet-Russian actor (1924–2012)

- Born: 16 January 1924; Moscow, Russian SFSR, Soviet Union
- Died: 30 June 2012 (aged 88); Moscow, Russia
- Awards: Stalin Prize of first degree (1950), Stalin Prize of second degree (1951)

Vladlen Semyonovich Davydov (Russian: Владле́н Семёнович Давы́дов; 1924 — 2012) was a Soviet and Russian theater and film actor. People's Artist of the RSFSR (1969). The winner of two Stalin Prizes (1950, 1951). Member of the Communist Party of the Soviet Union since 1950. Academician of the National Academy of Motion Picture Arts.

== Family ==
- Wife — Margarita Anastasyeva (born 10 January 1925), Honored Artist of Russia, Moscow Art Theatre's actress and author
  - Son — Andrey Davydov (born 2 July 1951), Honored Artist of Russia, Moscow Art Theatre's actor.

== Filmography ==
- 1944: Ivan the Terrible as oprichnik
- 1949: Encounter at the Elbe as Nikita Kuzmin — Stalin Prize of first degree (1950)
- 1950: Cossacks of the Kuban as breeder Nikolai Matveyevich Kovylev
- 1953: Outpost in the Mountains as Sergey Lunin
- 1957: The Road to Calvary as decadent poet Alexei Bessonov
- 1960: Letiste neprijímá as Kulygin
- 1962: Amphibian Man as Olsen, the reporter
- 1970: Liberation I: The Fire Bulge as Konstantin Rokossovsky
- 1970: Liberation II: Breakthrough as Konstantin Rokossovsky
- 1971: Liberation III: Direction of the Main Blow as Konstantin Rokossovsky
- 1972: Tobacco Captain (TV Movie) as Peter the Great
- 1973: Seventeen Moments of Spring (TV Series) as Dulles employee
- 1977: Soldiers of Freedom (TV Mini-Series) as Konstantin Rokossovsky
- 1984: TASS Is Authorized to Declare... (TV Movie) as Yeremin, a spokesman for the Foreign Ministry
- 2000: The Envy of Gods as Sonia's father
- 2000: The Will of the Emperor as Dmitry Mikhaylovich Golitsyn
- 2011: Burnt by the Sun 2: The Citadel as Vsevolod Konstantinovich

== Awards ==
- Stalin Prize of the first degree (1950)
- Stalin Prize second degree (1951)
- State Prize of the Russian Federation (1997)
- Order of the Badge of Honour (1950)
- Order of Friendship of Peoples (1984)
- Order of Honour (1998)
- Order For Merit to the Fatherland IV degree (2004)
- Honored Artist of the RSFSR (1959)
- People's Artist of the RSFSR (1969)
