= Otto Reutter =

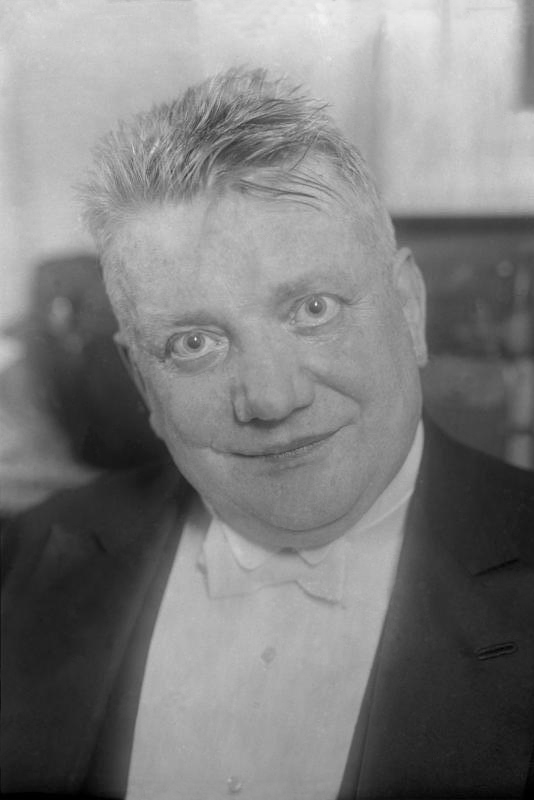
Otto Reutter

Otto Reutter (born Otto Pfützenreuter: April 24, 1870 in Gardelegen, Germany – March 3, 1931 in Düsseldorf, Germany) was a German comedian, coupletist, and singer.

Born into a poor Catholic family, Reutter attended the Catholic school in Gardelegen and was then trained as a salesman's assistant. After completing his apprenticeship, he moved to Berlin where he became active in theater and as a comedian. Afterwards he moved to Karlsruhe and became part of a troupe of tavern singers and comedians there.

In 1895, he first appeared as a "salon humorist", probably in Bern, Switzerland. The following year he had his breakthrough.

Particularly notable about Reutter was his ability to deliver original, amusing lyrics in a singsong manner, his persona full of irony and wit. After a successful appearance in the "Wintergarten Variety" of the Berlin Central Hotel, Reutter was hailed as a celebrity, and was considered in the following decades as one of the leading artists of the stage in Germany.

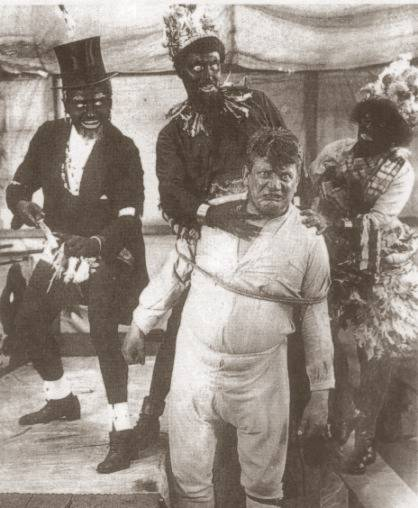
Still image of an Otto Reutter movie from 1912

In the 1920s, Reutter wrote many of the songs for which he is still well known today, songs that have been sung by many well-known German artists. He wrote over a thousand Couplets, a German form of amusing cabaret song.

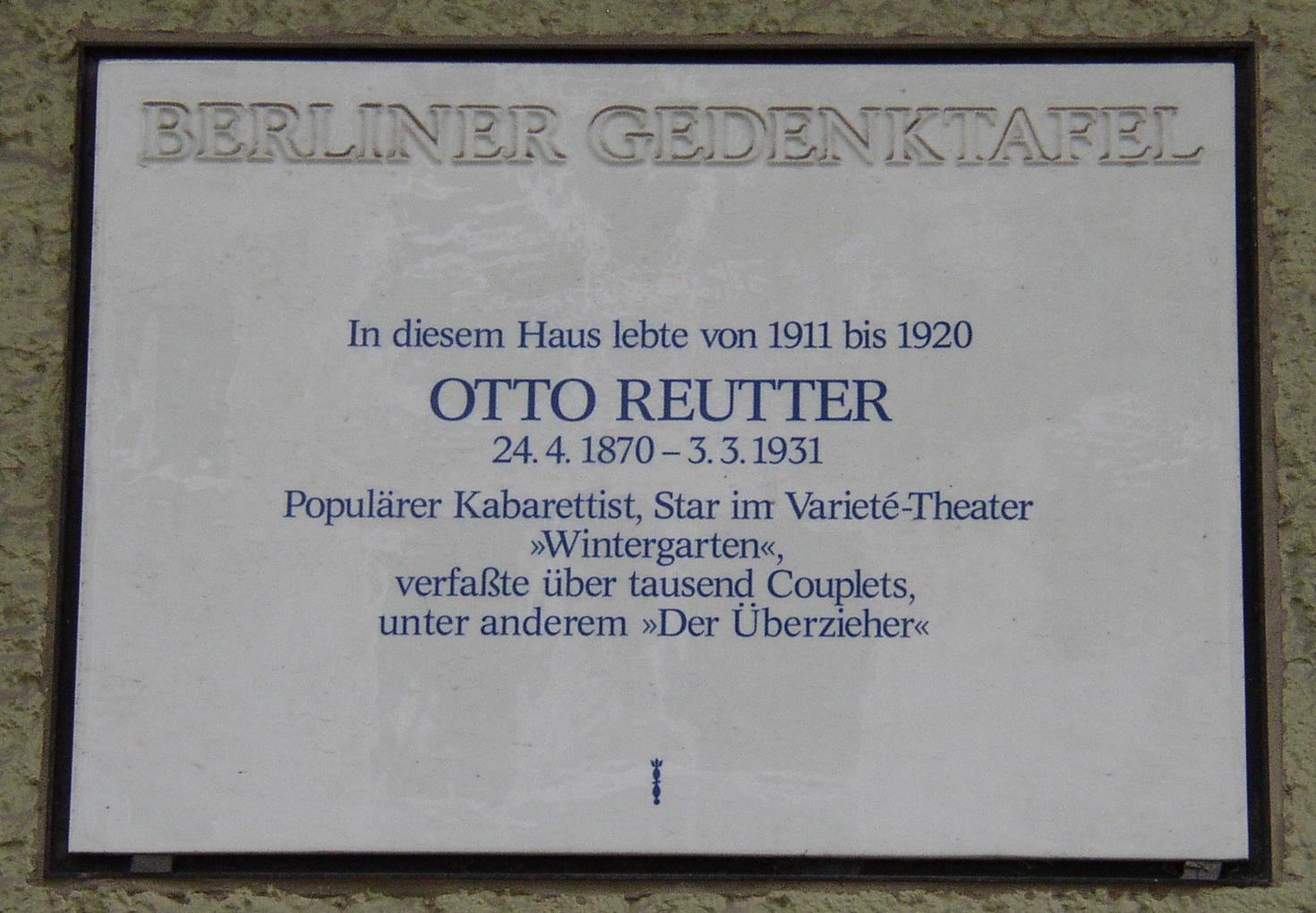
Berlin memorial plaque in Berlin-Wilmersdorf

Overstressed and having suffered some personal setbacks, Reutter intended to retire as a millionaire in 1919, after a successful thirty-year career. He had invested his fortune in his house (known as Waldschnibbe) in Gardelegen, as well as in war bonds. As World War I came to an end and the German inflation struck, Reutter lost a good portion of this fortune and thus had to continue to support himself by delivering his songs on various small stages.

Hence, starting around 1919, his "mature work" began to appear: songs that were especially characterized by humor and melancholy, the wisdom of life, and a kind of weary sass and bite.

His songs didn't just foresee societal changes, but also presented their listeners with comfort in times that required great sacrifice. His songs tended to follow the taste of the times, as well as current events.

Sick and exhausted, Otto Reutter died during a guest appearance in Düsseldorf in 1931, and was buried in Gardelegen.

== Selected works ==
- Ach wie fein (wird's in 100 Jahren sein) (um 1900)
- Alles wegn de Leut (1926)
- Berlin is ja so große (1913)
- Der gewissenhafte Maurer (1920)
- Der Überzieher (1925)
- In fünfzig Jahren ist alles vorbei (1920)
- Wir fang'n noch mal von vorne an (1925)
- Das ist so einfach, und man denkt nicht dran (1925)
- Nehm se 'n Alten (1926)
- Mir hab'ne se als jeheilt entlassen (1928)
- Und dadurch gleicht sich alles wieder aus (1928)
- Es geht vorwärts! (1920; 1930)
- Ein Sachse ist immer dabei! (1930)
- Und so kommen wir aus der Freude gar nicht raus (1930)
- Otto Reutter – Der König der Kleinkunst – Folge 1 und 2, 8 CD-ROMs, 2005 Membran Music Ltd., Vertrieb Grosser und Stein, Pforzheim, ISBN 3-86562-235-6 and ISBN 3-86562-236-4.
