= Behind the Last Line =

- Directed by: Nikolai Stambula
- Written by: Eduard Volodarsky
- Produced by: Mikhail Kupfer; Andrey Kupfer; Sergey Torchilin
- Starring: Yevgeny Sidikhin; Igor Talkov; Viktor Stepanov
- Cinematography: Gennady Karyuk; Alexander Karyuk
- Music by: Igor Kantyukov
- Production companies: Mosfilm; Circle Film Studio
- Release date: 1991
- Running time: 107 minutes
- Country: USSR
- Language: Russian

Behind the Last Line (Russian: За последней чертой, romanized: Za posledney chertoy) is a Soviet crime fighter directed by Nikolai Stambula and starring Yevgeny Sidikhin and Igor Talkov.

== Plot ==
Boxer Viktor Dryomov, having left prison after serving 3 years for beating, finds himself in a difficult situation. The woman he loved went to the old antiquary, and there is no money and no work. Soon, he falls under the supervision of racketeers, who, through skillful provocation and police connections, are trying to attract the former boxing champion to criminal activities. It’s not easy to refuse gangsters, and under their influence, he agrees to work for them. However, later Victor refuses to continue engaging in racketeering, and as a result, a false denunciation is fabricated against him. Dremova is detained by the police, but he does not wait for the charges to be brought. Having escaped from the police station, the hero decides to act and alone destroys the bandits.

== Cast ==
- Yevgeny Sidikhin as Viktor Dryomov
- Igor Talkov as Garik, racketeer
- Viktor Stepanov as Starodubtsev, Dryomov's coach
- Tatyana Lyutaeva as Irina
- Vladimir Kashpur as Nikolai
- Igor Mirkurbanov as racketeer Tolyan
- Nikita Dzhigurda as a cook in a kebab house
- Alina Tarkinskaya as prostitute Mary
- Yekaterina Kmit as Mary's friend
- Vladimir Talkov as racketeer driver

== Production ==
Exactly 1 year before the murder of Igor Talkov, on October 6, 1990, the scene of the murder of his hero was filmed. Filming took place in Moscow on Kaluga Square, Goncharnaya Street, Chistoprudny Boulevard and Yelokhovskaya Square.
