= Pascal (singer) =

Soviet-Russian singer (born 1964)

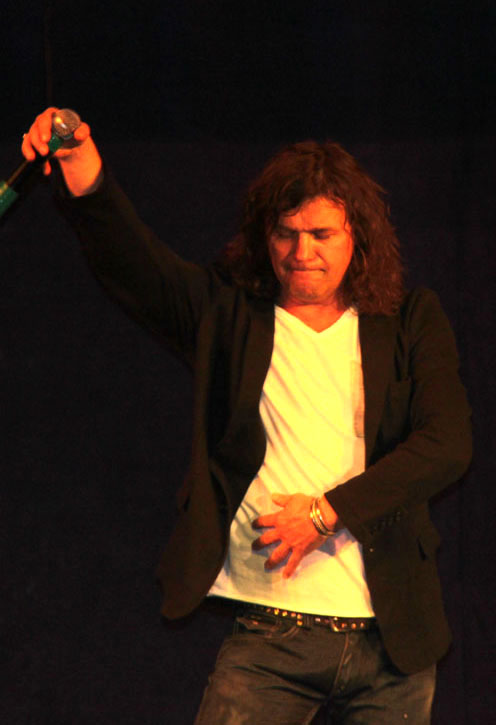

Background information
- Born: Pavel Petrovich Titov; 17 August 1964 (age 61); Bryn, Kaluga Oblast, USSR
- Origin: Moscow, Russia
- Genres: Pop, Russian music, rock
- Occupation: Singer
- Instruments: vocals, acoustic guitar
- Label: MSH Records
- Website: pasckal.com

Pascal (real name – Pavel Petrovich Titov, Russian: Павел Петрович Титов; born 17 August 1964, Bryn, Duminichsky District, Kaluga Oblast, RSFSR, USSR) is a Soviet and Russian pop singer, musician and composer.

Together with the poet Konstantin Arsenev wrote a number of songs for Grigory Leps. He participated in the creation of the album "Pure works", dedicated to the 50th anniversary of Igor Talkov.

== Biography ==
A first education – architect (special secondary – Kaluga municipal Civil Engineering).

For music education entered the Musical College named after Mussorgsky, but after the first year enrolled in the second year of Gnessin State Musical College, the vocal department.

Since the fifth grade, Titov played in amateur teen ensembles: first as a drummer, then – as a guitarist.

Songs began writing while serving in the army. In the mid-80s, Pavel went to Leningrad, where he became a singer and author of the rock band word "We", who played in rock-laboratory groups Alisa, AVIA, Boris Grebenshchikov and other musical authorities.

Since 1998 began to act under the pseudonym Pascal. According to the singer, this nickname is derived from the school nicknames given Titov dislike for the exact sciences. The songs Silk Heart and 100% love on poems by Konstantin Arsenev became a hit on many radio stations.

== Awards ==
- 2000, 2002 – Pesnya goda
- 2004 – Best of the Best (Best singer of the year)
