= Veniamin Nechayev =

Soviet musician

Veniamin Nechayev Вениамин Нечаев
- Also known as: Venedikt Petrovich Nechayev
- Born: 20 March 1915; Novonikolayevsk, Russian Empire (present-day Novosibirsk, Russia)
- Died: 15 August 1987 (aged 72) Leningrad, Russian SFSR, Sovet Union (present-day Saint Petersburg, Russia
- Genres: estrada
- Occupations: Musician, film actor
- Instrument: guitar
- Years active: 1948 – 1979

Veniamin Petrovich Nechayev (Note: Russian: Вениамин Петрович Нечаев, romanized: Veniamin Petrovich Nechayev) (20 March 1915 – 15 August 1987, also Venedikt) (Note: Russian: Венедикт Петрович Нечаев, romanized: Venedikt Petrovich Nechayev) was a Soviet musician (guitarist) and film actor, the member of the estrada duet of Nechayev & Rudakov, which was popular in the 1950s. He was the Merited Artist of the Russian Soviet Federative Socialist Republic (1961).

== Early life ==
Veniamin Nechayev was born in Novonikolayevsk on 20 March 1915. He graduated from music school. In 1938, he became a laureate of the All-Union contest of artists-instrumentalists. He worked in Novosibirsk radio committee's orchestra. He fought in World War II.

== Duet Nechayev & Rudakov ==
He met Pavel Rudakov in Khabarovsk during their military service in the post-war years. After demobilization they worked in Far East Philharmonic Hall for about three years.

In 1948, Nechayev and Rudakov formed a estrada duet and gave first concert in Leningrad. They accompanied themselves; lyrics for them were written by Konstantinov, Ratser, Grey, Merlin. Lyrics were written on topical issues (In newspaper at morning – in verse at evening) thus shaping the popularity of the duet which had become one of the signs of the times of the Khrushchev Thaw. Even Nikita Khrushchev himself treated Nechayev and Rudakov with sympathy; artists were invited to important meetings on cultural issues.

In 1962, the duet was dissolved. The duet was reunited one time specifically for filming in Moscow Does Not Believe in Tears – director invited them to participate in the movie, with a view to recreation the atmosphere of 1950s.

== Later years and death ==
After 1962, Nechayev worked as master of ceremonies. He died on 15 August 1987 in Leningrad.

== Filmography ==
- 1959 – Не имей сто рублей... – head stage director of the theatre
- 1980 – Moscow Does Not Believe in Tears – cameo

== See also ==
- Pavel Rudakov
