= Roman Gromadsky =

Soviet and Russian actor (1940–2021)

Roman Borisovich Gromadsky (Russian: Рома́н Бори́сович Грома́дский; December 18, 1940 – August 28, 2021) was a Soviet and Russian theater and film actor and theater teacher. He was awarded People's Artist of the RSFSR in 1983.

== Selected filmography ==
- Two Tickets for a Daytime Picture Show (1967) as hussar
- The Green Carriage (1967) as hussar
- King Lear (1971) as Gloucester's servant
- A Lover's Romance (1974) as Solovyov
- Tsarevich Alexei (1997) as episode (uncredited)
- The Circus Burned Down, and the Clowns Have Gone (1998) as Pyotr Stepanovich
- Empire Under Attack (2000) as Stranden
- Secrets of Investigation (2004) as Kumachyov
