= Older Sister =

- Movie poster
- Directed by: Georgy Natanson
- Written by: Alexander Volodin
- Produced by: Viktor Slonimsky
- Starring: Tatyana Doronina; Natalya Tenyakova; Mikhail Zharov
- Cinematography: Valery Vladimirov
- Edited by: Lyudmila Pechieva
- Music by: Vladlen Chistyakov
- Production company: Mosfilm
- Release date: 1966
- Running time: 102 min
- Country: Soviet Union
- Language: Russian

Older Sister (Russian: Старшая сестра, romanized: Starshaya sestra) is a Soviet feature film, shot in 1966, Georgy Natanson on the play by Aleksandr Volodin My older sister.

== Plot ==
In Leningrad, two orphaned sisters, Nadya and Lida Ryazayeva, live with their uncle, Ukhov. Nadya works at a construction site while studying at a technical school, and Lida is a high school student. The narrative begins with philosophical debates about happiness, contrasting Lida's belief in the joy of labor for others with her personal dissatisfaction. Complications arise when a misunderstanding involving Nadya and a man named Ogorodnikov brings conflict and embarrassment. Meanwhile, Lida, encouraged by Nadya’s unwavering belief in her talent, attempts to enter a theatrical school but fails. Nadya unexpectedly impresses the selection committee with her knowledge of Stanislavski's work, earning a place herself. Despite this, she agrees with her uncle's practical advice to focus on her job and studies, shelving her theatrical aspirations for her sister’s well-being.

Years pass, and Lida, now sick after a skiing trip organized by her old friend Kirill, rekindles their bond despite his marriage. Their secret relationship strains everyone, particularly Nadya, who clashes with Lida over her choices and confronts Kirill’s wife, Shura, a cheerful and unsuspecting teacher. The tension culminates in emotional breakdowns as Lida accuses Nadya of controlling her life, leading to a heated fallout and Lida's departure. Nadya, wracked with guilt and unable to reconcile her actions, is left questioning what to do next. In the end, Lida chooses to leave Kirill, finding strength in separating herself from the tangled emotions that defined her relationships.

== Cast ==
- Tatyana Doronina as Nadya, older sister
- Natalya Tenyakova as Lydia, younger sister
- Mikhail Zharov as Dmitry Petrovich Ukhov (uncle Mitya)
- Vitaly Solomin as Kirill
- Leonid Kuravlyov as Volodya
- Valentina Sharykina as Shura
- Yevgeniy Yevstigneyev as Ogorodnikov
- Oleg Basilashvili as Oleg Medynsky
- Inna Churikova as Nelly
- Viktor Ilichyov as entrant
