= Time of Desires =

1984 film by Yuli Raizman

- Directed by: Yuli Raizman
- Written by: Anatoly Grebnev
- Starring: Vera Alentova; Anatoly Papanov
- Cinematography: Nikolay Olonovsky
- Edited by: Galina Patrikeeva
- Music by: Alexander Belyaev
- Production company: Mosfilm
- Release date: 21 December 1984 (Soviet Union)
- Running time: 103 minutes
- Country: Soviet Union
- Language: Russian

Time of Desires (Russian: Время желаний, romanized: Vremya zhelaniy) is a 1984 Soviet romantic drama film directed by Yuli Raizman, the last in his filmography.

== Plot ==
An energetic, modern woman, she believes that with the help of connections and sober calculation, everything can be achieved: well-being, respectability, and even personal happiness. She does not realise that the fulfillment of her desires does not make the person closest to her happy. The consequences are unexpected and terrible.

== Cast ==
- Vera Alentova as Svetlana
- Anatoly Papanov as Vladimir
- Vladislav Strzhelchik as Nikolay Nikolayevich, a composer
- Tatyana Yegorova as Mila
- Boris Ivanov as Andrey Sergeyevich

== Awards ==
Awarded Vasilyev Brothers State Prize of the RSFSR.
