= Viktor Stepanov (actor) =

- Born: Viktor Fyodorovich Stepanov; 21 May 1947; Severo-Kurilsk, Soviet Union
- Died: 26 December 2005 (aged 58); Kyiv, Ukraine
- Occupation: Actor
- Years active: 1964-2005

Viktor Fyodorovich Stepanov (Russian: Виктор Фёдорович Степанов; 21 May 1947 — 26 December 2005) was a Russian actor. He appeared in more than fifty films from 1964 to 2005.

== Selected filmography ==
Year	Title	Role	Notes
1986	Mikhail Lomonosov	Lomonosov	
1988	The Cold Summer of 1953	Mankov	
1989	The Stairway	Kirill	
1990	Deja Vu	Krivonoschenko	
1991	Behind the Last Line	Starodubtsev	
1992	Oxygen Starvation	Praporshchik Gamaliya	
1992	Orlando	Russian ambassador	
1992	Dreams of Russia	Nevidimov	
1997	Schizophrenia	Nikolay Yurievich	
1997	Tsarevich Alexei	Pyotr I	
1998	Khrustalyov, My Car!	Terenty Fomich	
2000	The Undefeated	NKVD major	
