= Victor Kostetskiy =

Russian and Soviet actor

- Born: Victor Aleksandrovitch Kostetskiy; 12 April 1941; Zhmerynka, Ukrainian SSR, USSR
- Died: 6 November 2014 (aged 73); Saint-Petersburg, Russia
- Occupation(s): Actor, theatre teacher
- Years active: 1965–2014
- Awards: Honored Artist of the RSFSR (1978); Gold Soffit (2008)

Victor Aleksandrovich Kostetskiy (Russian: Ви́ктор Алекса́ндрович Косте́цкий; 12 April 1941 – 6 November 2014) was a Russian and Soviet actor.

== Biography ==
Kosteskiy was born in Zhmerynka. He lived in St. Petersburg. He spent eighteen months in the graphic arts department of the Herzen Pedagogical Institute. In 1965 he graduated from Saint Petersburg State Theatre Arts Academy (Boris Sohn's course).

=== Stage ===
Between 1965 and 1972 he was actor of the Leningrad Lenin Komsomol theater, then he became actor of the Leningrad Theater of Musical Comedy (until 1989). He then joined the main cast of Drama Theater Pushkin, leaving the theater in 2008. In his last years he only played in the combination company productions of the theater Comedians.

=== Cinema ===
Some of Kostetskiy's most famous roles were in films directed by Vladimir Vorobyov: Wedding of Krechinsky, Truffaldino from Bergamo and Treasure Island. He also often participated in the dubbing of foreign and animated films.

=== Other ===
He appeared in the 1991 teleplay of the first part of The Lord of the Rings as Gandalf. From 1990 until his death in 2014 he was a lecturer at the Department of Musical Comedy, Head of the Department of stage movement and speech at the St. Petersburg Conservatory.

=== Awards ===
He was made an Honored Artist of the RSFSR in 1978 and awarded the St. Petersburg theatrical prize Golden Soffit for the role of Dr. Dorn in the premiere performance Notebooks of Trigorin of Theatre Comedians (interpretation of Chekhov's play The Seagull). Nominated of Best Actor.

== Personal life ==
He was twice married, has two daughters from different marriages and three grandchildren.

Kostetskiy died on 6 November 2014 at the age of 74.

== Filmography ==
=== Film ===
- The Green Carriage (Russian: Зелёная карета, 1967) as Perepelsky
- Dreams of Love – Liszt (Ференц Лист, 1970) as canvasser (uncredited)
- Krechinsky's Wedding (Свадьба Кречинского, 1974) as Mikhail Vasilyevich Krechinsky
- The Captivating Star of Happiness (Звезда пленительного счастья, 1975) as Pyotr Kakhovsky
- I Ask to Accuse Klava K. of My Death (В моей смерти прошу винить Клаву К., 1980) as Pavel Lavrov
- Moonzund (Моонзунд, 1988) as commander of the Russian cruiser Rurik
- Genius (Гений, 1991) as Ivan Vazhin
- Khraniteli (Хранители, 1991) as Gandalf
- Raspoutine (Распутин, 2011) as archimandrite

=== TV ===
- Truffaldino from Bergamo (Труффальдино из Бергамо, 1977, TV Movie) as Florindo Aretusi
- Treasure Island (Остров сокровищ, 1982, TV Movie) as Dr. Livesey
- The Life of Klim Samgin (Жизнь Клима Самгина, 1988) as Georgy Gapon
- Bandit Petersburg (Бандитский Петербург, 2000) as deputy of General Attorney of Russia
- Deadly Force (Убойная сила, 2000-2006) as Major-General Alexander Aleksandrovich Maksimov
