= The Stairway =

- Лестница
- Directed by: Aleksei Sakharov
- Screenplay by: Alexander Zhitinsky
- Starring: Oleg Menshikov; Elena Yakovleva
- Cinematography: Nikolay Nemolyayev
- Music by: Vladimir Komarov
- Production companies: Mosfilm Studio, Creative Association "Rhythm"
- Release date: 1989
- Running time: 114 minutes
- Country: Soviet Union
- Language: Russian

The Stairway (Russian: Лестница, romanized: Lesnitsa) is a 1989 Soviet drama film directed by Aleksei Sakharov and based on the novella of the same name by Alexander Zhitinsky. The film was produced by Mosfilm. It is also referred to in English as Ladder or The Staircase.

== Plot ==
The story takes place in a Leningrad communal apartment Pushkinskaya Street, 17.

The protagonist, Vladimir Piroshnikov, plans to end his life by jumping off a bridge. He is stopped by a passing woman, Alya, who takes him to her home. The next morning, Vladimir wakes up in the empty studio of Alya's sculptor neighbor. While trying to leave, he discovers a staircase that mysteriously never ends. Seeking Alya's help, he learns that he is not the first to encounter this phenomenon. Alya’s former partner escaped by cheating on her and climbing out of her neighbor Larisa’s window, which led directly to the street. When Vladimir attempts to escape using a rope from the fifth floor, Alya’s uncle Mikhail, who has arrived from Tula, mistakes him for a thief and intervenes. Another neighbor, Granny Nyura, observes these events from her apartment.

Persistently attempting to escape, Vladimir climbs onto the roof. Exhilarated by a sense of freedom, he slips and nearly falls but manages to grab a shaky ledge at the last moment. The film ends ambiguously.

== Cast ==
- Oleg Menshikov as Vladimir Piroshnikov
- Elena Yakovleva as Alevtina Ivanova
- Svetlana Amanova as Larisa Pavlovna
- Sergey Artsybashev as Georgy Staritsky
- Leonid Kuravlyov as Uncle Misha
- Kapitolina Ilyenko as Anna Kondratyevna
- Viktor Stepanov as Kirill

== Awards ==
- 1991 IFF Experimental Films in Madrid
- Prize for Best Cinematography (Nikolay Nemolyaev)
- 1990 IFF Sci-Fi Films in Rome - Prize (Alexey Sakharov)
- 1990 IFF Sci-Fi Films in Rome - For Best Actress (Elena Yakovleva)
