= Igor Gordin =

Russian actor of theater and cinema (born 1965)

- Игорь Гордин
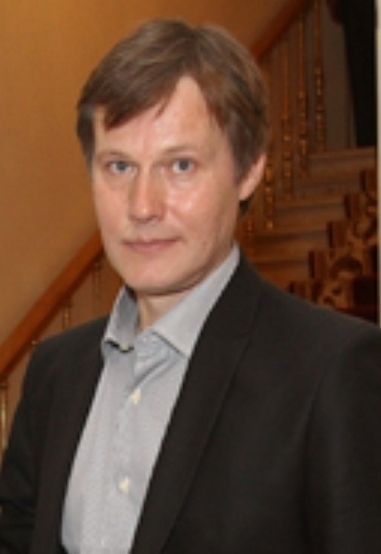
- Gordin at the Golden Mask festival and awards in April 2012
- Born: Igor Gennadyevich Gordin; 6 May 1965 (age 61); Leningrad, RSFSR, USSR
- Citizenship: Soviet Union; Russia
- Education: Peter the Great St. Petersburg Polytechnic University; Russian Academy of Theatre Arts
- Occupation: Actor
- Spouses: Yuliya Menshova (m. 1996; div. 2004) (m. 2008)
- Children: 2

Igor Gennadyevich Gordin (Russian: И́горь Генна́дьевич Го́рдин; born 6 May 1965) is a Soviet and Russian actor of theater and cinema. Honored Artist of the Russian Federation (2004). Laureate of the Golden Mask (2011).

== Biography ==
Gordin was born in Leningrad, Russian SFSR, Soviet Union (now Saint Petersburg, Russia).

Since the eighth grade of secondary school secretly from his parents he played at the Theater of Youth Creativity (TYUT) at the Leningrad Palace of Pioneers.

He graduated from the Peter the Great St. Petersburg Polytechnic University, specializing in nuclear physics, but did not quit the scene. I went to Moscow to get an acting education.

In 1993 he graduated from the acting department of the Russian Institute of Theatrical Art – GITIS (course of Irina Sudakova).

After graduation, GITIS worked a theatrical season at the Moscow State Academic Sovremennik Theatre.

In 1994, he moved to the main roles in the Moscow Theater of Young Spectators, where he currently works.

== Personal life ==
Gordin is married to actress and television host Yuliya Menshova, with whom he has two children: Andrey Gordin (born 1997) and Taisia Gordina (born 2003).

== Selected filmography ==
- Children of the Arbat (2004) as Igor Vladimirovich
- Heavenly Court (2014) as Alex
- Coach (2018) as President of FC Spartak Moscow
- Gold Diggers (2019) as Boris Markovich
- Palmira (2022) as Major general
- Peter I: The Last Tsar and the First Emperor (2022) as Menshikov
