= Pavel Rudakov =

Soviet musician (1915–1993)

Pavel Rudakov Павел Рудаков
- Born: 15 July 1915; Tula, Russian Empire
- Died: 16 January 1993 (aged 77) Saint Petersburg, Russia
- Genres: estrada
- Occupations: musician, film actor
- Instrument: concertina
- Years active: 1948–1990
- Formerly of: Rudakov & Nechayev

Pavel Vasilyevich Rudakov (Note: Russian: Павел Васильевич Рудаков, romanized: Pavel Vasilyevich Rudakov) (15 July 1915 – 16 January 1993) was a Soviet musician (concertina player) and film actor, the member of the estrada duet of Rudakov & Nechayev, which was popular in the 1950s. He was the Merited Artist of the Russian Soviet Federative Socialist Republic (1961).

== Early life ==
Pavel Rudakov was born in Tula on 15 July 1915. He worked at the Tula Weapons Factory, then – at circus and at philharmonic hall. He fought in World War II.

== Duet Rudakov & Nechayev ==
He met Veniamin Nechayev in Khabarovsk during their military service in the post-war years. After demobilization they worked in Far East Philharmonic Hall for about three years.

In 1948, Rudakov and Nechayev formed a estrada duet and gave first concert in Leningrad. They accompanied themselves; lyrics for them were written by Konstantinov, Ratser, Grey, Merlin. Lyrics were written on topical issues (In newspaper at morning – in verse at evening) thus shaping the popularity of the duet which had become one of the signs of the times of the Khrushchev Thaw. Even Nikita Khrushchev himself treated Rudakov and Nechayev with sympathy; artists were invited to important meetings on cultural issues.

In 1962, the duet was dissolved. The duet was reunited one time specifically for filming in Moscow Does Not Believe in Tears – director invited them to participate in the movie, with a view to recreation the atmosphere of 1950s.

== Later years and death ==
After 1962, Rudakov worked on solo career and was a mentor of new generation performers. He died on 16 January 1993 in Saint Petersburg.

== Filmography ==
- 1958 – Улица полна неожиданностей – drunk man in the police station
- 1959 – Не имей сто рублей... – Vasiliy Gulyaev
- 1968 – Удар! Еще удар! – football fan
- 1980 – Moscow Does Not Believe in Tears – cameo
- 1990 – Бумажные глаза Пришвина – Lev Shutov

== See also ==
- Veniamin Nechayev
