= Action, Manya! =

- Directed by: Roman Yershov
- Written by: Roman Yershov; Igor Vinnichenko
- Starring: Yuliya Menshova; Sergey Bekhterev; Yevgeny Vesnik; Georgy Millyar
- Cinematography: Radik Askarov; Valeriy Müllgaut
- Music by: Andrei Andersen
- Production company: Lenfilm
- Release date: 1991
- Running time: 110 minutes
- Country: Soviet Union
- Language: Russian

Action, Manya! (Russian: Действуй, Маня!, romanized: Deystvuy Manya) is a 1991 Soviet science fiction comedy film directed by Roman Yershov.

== Plot ==
Two scientists: the biologist-geneticist (Yevgeny Vesnik) and the programmer Kostya (Sergey Bekhterev) wish to create a cyborg-superman to fight against the mafia. However, in the programming process a mistake happens: instead of superman they got super-Manya: the robot is given the form of a female glamour model about whom the programmer secretly fantasized.

However, Manya (Yuliya Menshova) despite her contrasting appearance is ready to carry out the initial plan, i.e., to combat world mafia and racketeers. And she successfully fulfills the task: neither bullets or by land-to-air missiles hurt her. However the mafia finds out, how to defeat the crime fighters: a real pin-up girl is presented to Kostya and he forgets about "Super Manya", and Manya is unable to cope with the latest achievements of the scientific progress. Nevertheless, everything ends successfully, crime is destroyed, but unfortunately this means the ens of the execution of the superwoman's program and she is about to be retired. The creators brighten up the last days of her existence with a deserved vacation.

== Cast ==
- Yuliya Menshova — Manya
- Sergey Bekhterev — programmer Kostya
- Yevgeny Vesnik — biologist—geneticist Evgeniy Danilovich
- Georgy Millyar — functionary Ivan Akimovich
- Anatoly Rudakov — man who invited Manya to dance
- Viktor Bychkov — Bychkov
- Yevgeny Morgunov — filmmaker
- Stanislav Sadalsky — butcher Vasya
- Semyon Furman — Alik
- Sergey Selin — pilot
- Roman Filippov — General
- Anatoly Azo — Chief
- Leonard Varfolomeev — restaurateur
- Igor Dobriakov — mafia member
- Sergei Polezhaev — Ivan Akimovich's secretary
- Vladimir Rublev — robber
- Sergey Tverdokhlebov — Cheese
- Alexander Slastin — coordinator
- Shukhrat Irgashev — episode
- Karina Razumovskaya — episode
- Vladimir Basov — entrepreneur at the market

== Reception ==
The comedy was criticized for an eclectic collection of cliches of action films and cliches about robots and artificial intelligence.
