= The Envy of Gods =

- Directed by: Vladimir Menshov
- Written by: Marina Mareeva; Vladimir Menshov
- Produced by: Vladimir Menshov; Alexander Litvinov
- Starring: Vera Alentova; Anatoly Lobotsky; Aleksandr Feklistov; Gérard Depardieu
- Cinematography: Vadim Alisov
- Edited by: Svetlana Ivanova
- Music by: Viktor Lebedev
- Production companies: Mosfilm; Zhanr Film Studio
- Release date: 2000
- Running time: 132 minutes
- Country: Russia
- Language: Russian

The Envy of Gods (Russian: Зависть Богов, romanized: Zavist Bogov) is a 2000 Russian romantic drama film directed by Vladimir Menshov.

== Plot ==
In the "History" Herodotus says, "The gods do not like happy people". In ancient times, people knew why they can not demonstrate their good fortune and happiness: it can cause jealousy and anger of the gods, because they believed that happiness is their, gods, privilege, and daring people who want the same thing, should be punished.

The film takes place in early autumn 1983 in Moscow, in an atmosphere of acute Cold War (including the war in Afghanistan, the incident with the South Korean "Boeing", etc.).

The main heroine of the picture Sonia (Vera Alentova) is an editor in television, she has a son, a graduate of the school, and her husband Sergei (Aleksandr Feklistov) is a quite successful Soviet writer. One day to visit them a Frenchman Bernard (Gérard Depardieu) comes, whom Sergei met while working on a book about the French Resistance, accompanied by a French translator of Russian descent named André (Anatoly Lobotsky). André also has a family in Paris. However, this meeting turns their lives upside down. André falls in love with Sonia at first sight and emphatically tries to get a new meeting with her. Sonia, a faithful wife, educated in the Soviet tradition of chastity, at first refuses; moreover employees of Soviet television are not allowed to enter in unsupervised contact with foreigners. But André still gets his way, and Sonia is also overtaken by a violent passion. She discovers such strong feelings about the possibility of which she previously did not know. For a few days of their lives Sonia and Andre are absolutely happy. But they soon have to separate because their countries belong to different worlds, divided by the Iron Curtain.

== Cast ==
- Vera Alentova as Sonia
- Anatoly Lobotsky as André
- Aleksandr Feklistov as Sergei, Sonia's husband
- Gérard Depardieu as Bernard
- Aleksandr Voroshilo as Krapivin
- Vladlen Davydov as Sonia's father
- Marina Dyuzheva as Natasha, Sonia's friend
- Lyudmila Ivanova as Sonia's mother-in-law
- Yuri Kolokolnikov as Sonia's son
- Victor Pavlov as Vilen
- Irina Skobtseva as Sonia's mother
- Leonid Trushkin as Vadim
- Larisa Udovichenko as Irina
- Vladimir Yeryomin as Igor, Natasha's husband
- Igor Kirillov as cameo
- Anna Shatilova as cameo
- Valery Prokhorov as trucker
- Daniil Spivakovsky as taxi driver
- Natalya Khorokhorina as administrator of movie theatre
- Valentinа Ushakova as railway worker
- Nina Yeryomina as cameo

== Soundtrack ==
1. The Long Tango
2. Meadows
3. The Dream No.1
4. The Date
5. The Catastrophy No.1
6. Loneliness
7. Tango `Beter` by J.Menshova
8. Thinking about the Past No.1
9. The Catastrophy No.2
10. Thinking about the Past No.2
11. Saying Good-bye
12. Finale
