= Palmira (film) =

Palmyra
- Directed by: Andrei Kravchuk
- Written by: Arif Aliyev
- Produced by: Alexei Uchitel
- Starring: Aleksandr Robak; Pavel Chinaryov; Aleksandr Metyolkin; Ekaterina Nesterova; Igor Gordin; Polina Pushkaruk; Vitaliya Korniyenko; Anna Potebnya
- Cinematography: Morad Abdel Fattakh
- Edited by: Aleksandr Koshelev (ru)
- Music by: Kuzma Bodrov
- Production company: Rock Films
- Distributed by: KaroProkat (English: KaroRental)
- Release date: February 17, 2022
- Country: Russia
- Languages: Russian, Arabic

Palmyra (Russian: Пальмира, romanized: Palmira, lit. 'Palmyra'), or (Russian: Однажды в Пустыне, lit. 'Once in the Desert') is a 2022 Russian war film directed by Andrei Kravchuk, tells about the sappers who work the Russian military operation in Syria.

It was theatrically released on February 17, 2022.

== Plot ==
Set in May 2016, the film follows a Russian sapper who is deployed to demine the ancient city of Palmyra, which had been seized by militants. While preparing the area for a concert by the Mariinsky Theatre Orchestra, he hopes for a reunion with a local girl he once helped. As the team approaches the historic site, tensions within the military unit rise, and the surrounding atmosphere grows increasingly perilous, capturing the intensity and complexity of the Syrian conflict.

== Cast ==
- Aleksandr Robak as Shaberov
- Pavel Chinaryov as Zhilin
- Aleksandr Metyolkin as Makarsky
- Ekaterina Nesterova as Jamila
- Igor Gordin as Major general
- Polina Pushkaruk as Zhilin's wife
- Vitaliya Korniyenko as Zhilin's daughter
- Anna Potebnya as Shaberov's daughter
- Aleksey Komashko as the groom of Shaberov's daughter

== Production ==
=== Filming ===
Principal photography took place in the Republic of Crimea, and was completed in November 2020, with some of the filming done by Syrian film producers who shot outdoor scenes in Palmyra itself for the producers.
