= Alexander Zhitinsky =

Russian journalist (1941–2012)

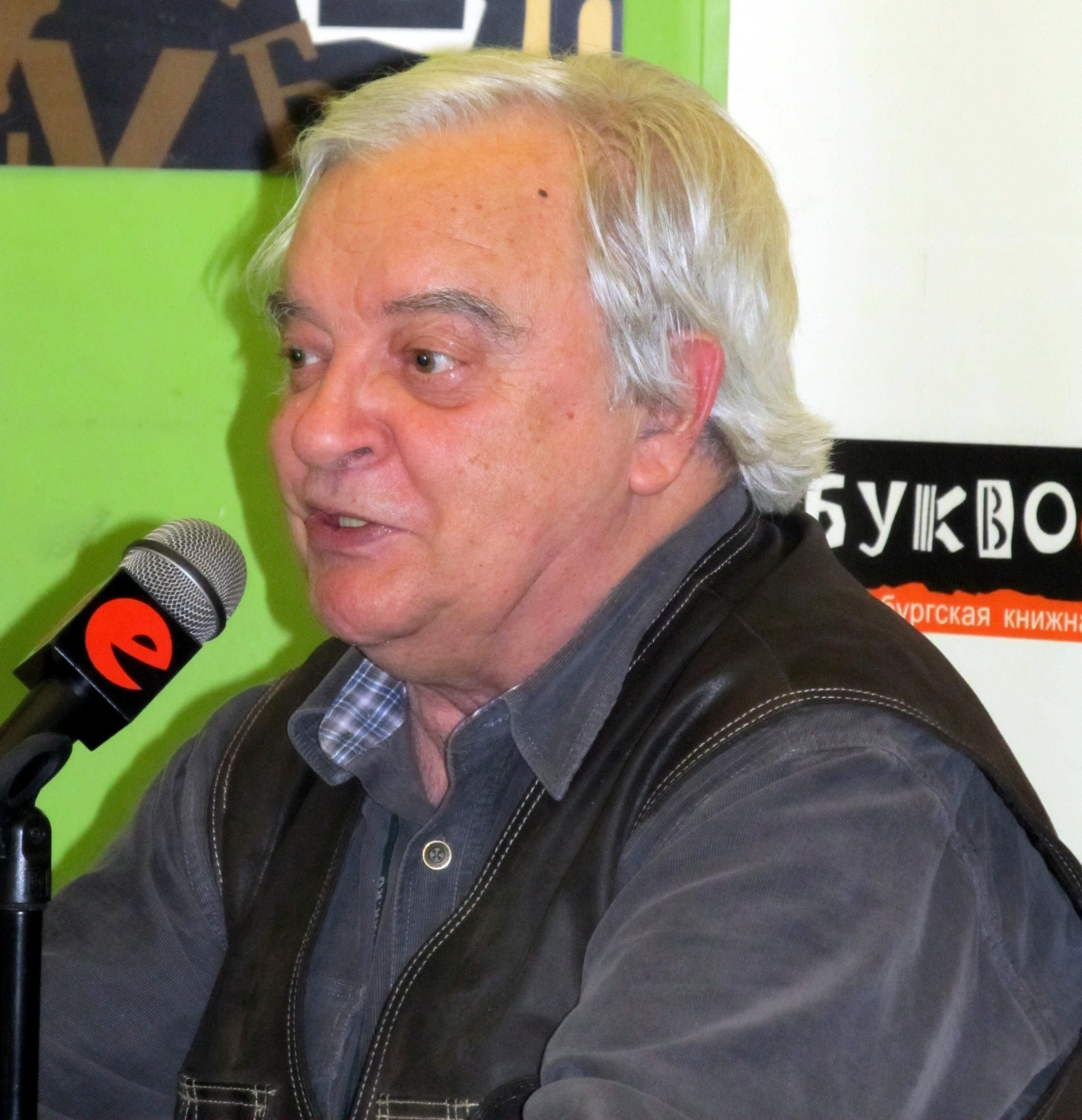
- Alexander Zhitinsky, 2011
- Born: Alexander Nikolayevich Zhitinsky; January 19, 1941; Simferopol, Crimean Autonomous Soviet Socialist Republic, USSR
- Died: January 25, 2012 (aged 71); Finland
- Occupations: writer and journalist

Alexander Nikolayevich Zhitinsky (Russian: Алекса́ндр Никола́евич Жити́нский; January 19, 1941 – January 25, 2012) was a Russian writer and journalist, founder of the Gelikon Plus publishing house. He used the pseudonyms Rock-diletant, МАССА, and Maccolit.

He was born into the family of a military pilot on January 19, 1941. After finishing his education at the Leningrad Polytechnic Institute, he became a well-known author, publishing 12 books during his career. He died on January 25, 2012.

The 1989 film The Stairway is based on his eponymous novella.
