= Tsarevich Alexei (film) =

- Russian: Царевич Алексей
- Directed by: Vitaly Melnikov
- Written by: Vitaly Melnikov; Dmitri Merezhkovsky
- Starring: Aleksey Zuyev; Viktor Stepanov; Ekaterina Kulakov; Natalya Egorova; Roman Gromadskiy
- Cinematography: Ivan Bagaev
- Music by: Andrei Petrov
- Release date: 1997
- Running time: 120 minute
- Country: Russia
- Language: Russian

Tsarevich Alexei (Russian: Царевич Алексей) is a 1997 Russian historical drama film directed by Vitaly Melnikov.

== Plot ==
Tsarevich Alexei was one of the smartest people in the state. His father Peter hoped that he would take his place, but Alexei did not want to be king.

== Cast ==
- Aleksey Zuyev as Tsarevich Aleksei Petrovich
- Viktor Stepanov as Pyotr I, 'Peter the Great'
- Ekaterina Kulakov as Afrosin'ya Fedorova, Aleksei's lover
- Natalya Egorova as Tsaritsa Ekaterina
- Roman Gromadskiy
- Stanislav Lyubshin as Pyotr Andreyevich Tolstoi
- Vladimir Menshov as Aleksandr Danilovich Menshikov
- Leon Niemczyk as Count Schonborn
- Fyodor Stukov
