= The Green Carriage =

- Directed by: Yan Frid
- Written by: Aleksandr Gladkov
- Starring: Natalya Tenyakova; Vladimir Chestnokov; Igor Dmitriev
- Cinematography: Anatoli Nazarov; Lev Sokolsky
- Edited by: Yevgenia Makhankova
- Music by: Vladlen Chistyakov
- Production company: Lenfilm Studio
- Release date: September 25, 1967
- Running time: 101 minutes
- Country: Soviet Union
- Language: Russian

The Green Carriage (Russian: Зелёная карета, romanized: Zelyonaya kareta) is a 1967 Soviet biographical drama film directed by Yan Frid and starring Natalya Tenyakova, Vladimir Chestnokov and Igor Dmitriev. It portrays the life of the nineteenth century stage actress Varvara Asenkova.

== Plot ==
The film tells the story of Varvara Nikolaevna Asenkova, an actress at the Alexandrinsky Theatre in the mid-19th century. She becomes the target of theatrical gossip, fabrications, and intrigues. Her beloved, an officer in the Tsarist army, cannot officially marry her because doing so would require her to leave the stage.

In reality, the love affair with the officer is a fictional element added by the filmmakers. Those who knew Varvara Asenkova described her as modest and reserved, with no known romantic relationships. Additionally, as a young actress performing in nearly 300 plays a year, she had neither the time nor the energy for love affairs.

Varvara Asenkova died at a young age, at the peak of her career.

The film also touches on the historical context of the Imperial Theatrical School, where students were transported in green carriages. Varvara's stepfather, Pavel Nikolaevich Krenitsyn, a retired military officer and the civil husband of her mother, Alexandra Yegorovna Asenkova—herself a well-known actress at the Alexandrinsky Theatre—served as the overseer of these carriages.

== Partial cast ==
- Natalya Tenyakova as Varvara Asenkova
- Vladimir Chestnokov as Sosnitski
- Igor Dmitriev as Dyur
- Aleksandr Susnin as Martynov
- Gleb Florinskiy as Vasily Karatygin
- Aleksandr Borisov as Gedeonov
- Lidiya Shtykan as Varvara's mother
- Tatyana Piletskaya as Samsonova
- Igor Ozerov as Glebov
- Irina Gubanova as Masha
- Aleksandr Sokolov as Kulikov
- Yulian Panich as Vasily
- Geliy Sysoev as Trosnikov
- Victor Kostetskiy as Perepelsky (prototype Nikolay Nekrasov)
- Valentina Kovel as actress
- Roman Gromadsky as hussar
- Vladislav Strzhelchik as Emperor Nicholas I

== Bibliography ==
- Peter Cowie / Derek Elley. World Filmography: 1967. Fairleigh Dickinson University Press, 1977.
