= In Order to Survive (film) =

- Promotional release poster
- Directed by: Vsevolod Plotkin
- Written by: Aleksandr Aristov; Elena Karavaeshnikova; Vsevolod Plotkin
- Produced by: Arthur Schweitzer
- Starring: Vladimir Menshov; Alexander Rosenbaum; Sergey Veksler
- Music by: Arne Schulze & Mark Minkov
- Production company: Cinevest Entertainment Group
- Release date: 1992
- Running time: 105 minutes
- Country: Russia
- Language: Russian

In Order to Survive (Russian: Чтобы выжить, tr. Chtoby Vyzhit or Chtoby Perezhit), also known as Red Mob, is a 1992 Russian action film directed and co-written by Vsevolod Plotkin, and starring Vladimir Menshov, Alexander Rosenbaum, and Sergey Veksler.

== Cast ==
- Vladimir Menshov as Oleg
- Aleksandr Rozenbaum as Jaffar
- Sergey Veksler as Nick
- Mitya Volkov as Yura
- Andrey Scherbovich-Vecher as Igor
- Yakov Golyakov as Old-Aka
- Murad Aliev as Kochmat
- Yuriy Gorobez as Secretary of ZK
- Oxana Salech as Gabrikova
- Anvar Kemdzaev as Abdi
- Arsen Amspuryanz as Old Businessman

== Home media ==
In 2016, the film was restored in 2K and received a limited edition DVD and Blu-ray release under the title Red Mob by Vinegar Syndrome. Vinegar Syndrome later gave the film a standard edition DVD and Blu-ray release. Both releases contain the Russian version of the film, as well as a slightly extended American version.
