= Shin Takarajima =

Shin Takarajima (新寶島 or 新宝島) may refer to:

- Shin Takarajima, Japanese manga by Sakai Shichima and Osamu Tezuka
- Shin Takarajima, 1965 Japanese anime special directed by Osamu Tezuka, a closer adaptation of Treasure Island than of his manga of the same name
- "Shin Takarajima", song by Japanese band Sakanaction

== See also ==
- New Formosa Band, Taiwanese pop music band
