= Takarajima (disambiguation) =

Takarajima (宝島, Takara-jima) is one of the Tokara Islands. It can also refer to:

- Dōbutsu Takarajima, a 1971 anime film adaptation of Robert Louis Stevenson's novel Treasure Island
- Treasure Island (Takarajima), a 1978 anime television series based on the same novel
