= Vera Alentova =

Soviet and Russian actress (1942–2025)

- Вера Алентова
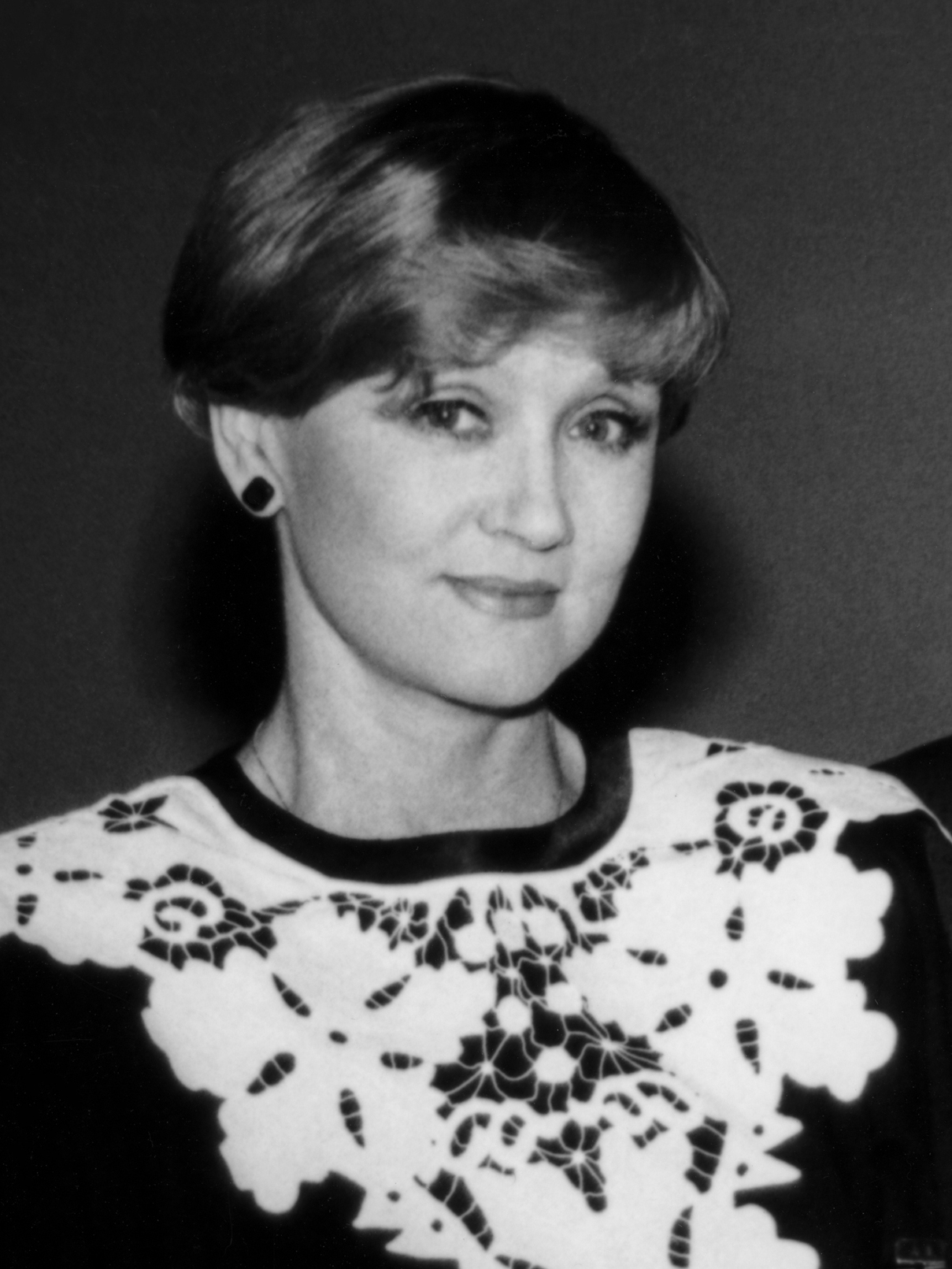
- Alentova in 1992
- Born: Vera Valentinovna Bykova; 21 February 1942; Kotlas, Arkhangelsk Oblast, Russian SFSR, Soviet Union
- Died: 25 December 2025 (aged 83); Moscow, Russia
- Education: Moscow Art Theatre
- Occupation: Actress
- Spouse: Vladimir Menshov (m. 1962; died 2021)
- Children: Yuliya Menshova

Vera Valentinovna Alentova (Russian: Вера Валентиновна Алентова; 21 February 1942 – 25 December 2025) was a Soviet and Russian actress known for her leading role in Moscow Does Not Believe in Tears (1980).

== Early life and career ==
Vera Alentova was born on 21 February 1942 in the town of Kotlas in the Arkhangelsk Oblast. Her parents were the actors Valentin Mikhailovich Bykov and Irina Nikolaevna Alentova. She was named in honor of her maternal grandmother, who died at the age of 28. The actress's grandfather graduated from Tomsk State University and worked as a doctor, her grandmother graduated from Bestuzhev's courses. Her father died when she was four years old, after which her mother took her to Ukraine.

She came to Moscow in 1961, where she entered the Moscow Art Theater School in a course of Vasily Petrovich Markov's. During the second course, Alentova married Vladimir Menshov who was also studying acting at the school. She finished her studies in 1965, after which she became an actress of the Moscow Pushkin Drama Theatre. In the same year, she debuted in cinema with the film Flying Days.

Alentova appeared in a leading role as Nastya in the 1975 miniseries Such a Short Long Life about the life of ordinary Soviet families.

In 1979 Alentova starred in the popular romantic drama Moscow Does Not Believe in Tears which was directed by her husband. It won the Academy Award for Best Foreign Language Film in 1981. In the film she played Katya Tikhomirova, a menial factory worker who rises to the ranks of a company director.

Alentova played the ill-tempered head teacher Valendra in the 1987 film Tomorrow Was the War directed by Yuri Kara.

She acted in two more productions directed by Menshov, What a Mess! (1995) and The Envy of Gods (2000).

From 2009, she cooperated with her husband, Vladimir Menshov, in an acting and directing workshop in VGIK.

== Personal life and death ==
Vera Alentova married director Vladimir Menshov in 1962. They had a daughter, Yuliya Menshova.

Alentova died in Moscow on 25 December 2025, after falling ill at a funeral service for her colleague Anatoly Lobotsky. She was 83.

== Awards ==
- USSR State Prize (1981) for her role in Moscow Does Not Believe in Tears
- Honored Artist of the RSFSR (1982)
- Vasilyev Brothers State Prize of the RSFSR (1986)
- People's Artist of Russia (1992)
- Order of Friendship (2001)
- Order of Honour (Russia) (2007)
- Order "For Merit to the Fatherland", 4th class (2012)
- Medal of Pushkin (2019)
- Order "For Merit to the Fatherland", 3rd class (2022)

== Filmography ==
- 1966: Flying Days as Lidia Fyodorovna (credited as Vera Bykova)
- 1967: The Red and the White as nurse
- 1976: Delivery as Olenina
- 1979: Moscow Does Not Believe in Tears as Katerina Tikhomirova
- 1984: Time of Desires as Svetlana
- 1987: Tomorrow Was the War as Valentina Andronovna
- 1995: Shirli-myrli as Carol Abzats, Zemfira Almazova, Lusiena Krolikova and Whitney Crolikow
- 2000: The Envy of Gods as Sonya Anikanova
- 2023: Empire V as Ishtar Borisovna

== Literature ==
- Vera Alentova. Everything is Not Accidental. — Moscow: Eksmo, 2022. — 554 p. — (Bestseller Autobiography). — ISBN 978-5-04-159459-6.
