= Return to Treasure Island =

Return to Treasure Island may refer to:

- Return to Treasure Island (1954 film), an American film directed by Ewald André Dupont set in the modern day, with Dawn Addams as Jim Hawkins' descendant
- Long John Silver (film) also known as Long John Silver's Return to Treasure Island is a 1954 American-Australian film, starring Robert Newton as Long John Silver
- Return to Treasure Island (TV series), a 1986 Disney mini-series
- Return to Treasure Island, the US title of the 1988 Soviet two-part animated film Treasure Island
- Silver: Return to Treasure Island, a 2012 novel by former British Poet Laureate Andrew Motion
