= Igor Talkov =

Russian singer-songwriter (1958–1991)

Igor Talkov Игорь Тальков
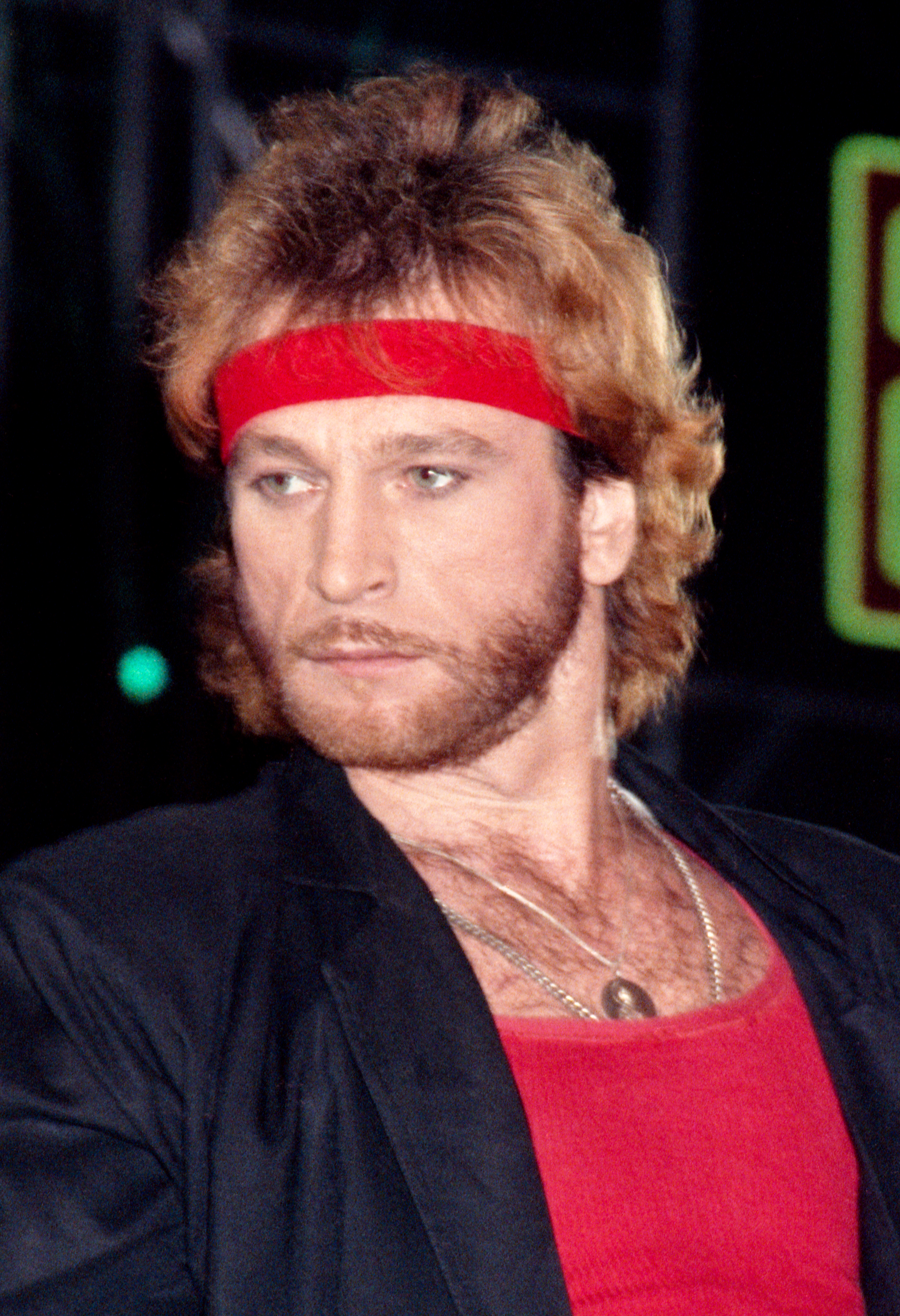
- Talkov in 1991

Background information
- Born: Igor Vladimirovich Talkov; 4 November 1956; Gretsovka, Shchyokinsky District, Tula Oblast, Russian SFSR, Soviet Union
- Died: 6 October 1991 (aged 34) Saint Petersburg, Russian SFSR, Soviet Union
- Genres: Russian rock; Bard; New wave; russian chanson
- Occupations: singer-songwriter, film actor
- Instruments: Vocals; Guitar; Bass guitar; Accordion; Piano; Drum kit
- Years active: 1973–1991

Igor Vladimirovich Talkov (Russian: И́горь Влади́мирович Талько́в; 4 November 1956 – 6 October 1991), was a Russian rock singer-songwriter and film actor. His breakthrough came in 1987 with the David Tukhmanov-composed song Clean Ponds which was an instant hit. Talkov's lyrics are mostly about love, but also contain social critique of the Soviet regime. He was shot dead in 1991.

== Early life and career ==
Igor Talkov was born in Gretsovka, Tula Oblast, Soviet Union on 4 November 1956. He grew up in Shchyokino. After leaving the army, Talkov started singing in the restaurants of Moscow and Sochi.

Igor Talkov joined Electroclub band in 1986. Talkov's breakthrough came in 1987 with the David Tukhmanov-composed song Clean Ponds which was an instant hit. While he is mostly remembered for songs about love and fate, most of his work held a clearly political message against the Soviet regime, calling for change. This is one of the reasons why Talkov was never popular with the Soviet government; even as a performer renowned and loved throughout the whole Soviet Union, he lived in a small two-room apartment with his wife and son, composing his lyrics and music "on top of the washing machine in the bathroom", according to the rumours. He was not satisfied with Perestroika, claiming it to be nothing but the same regime under a different guise. In his post-Perestroika songs, he openly mocked the changes, calling them a ruse. Talkov was an avid reader of pre-revolutionary Russian history, which served as the inspiration for many of his songs. He even guaranteed at his last concert that he was willing to "back up" his lyrics with historical facts.

Talkov also made a brief appearance in the cinema, acting in the films Behind the Last Line and Tsar Ivan the Terrible. The latter film he disliked, apologising to a preview audience for participating in the film. Since Talkov refused to complete post-production sound on the film, his character was voiced by another actor.

Talkov's songs also have much in common – particularly from a lyrical perspective – with Russian bard music.

== Death ==
According to Talkov's wife, Tatyana and son Igor Jr., in the last months of the singer's life, he received threats.

Many performers performed at the concert, which took place on 6 October 1991 in St. Petersburg at the Yubileiny Sports Palace. A friend of the singer Aziza, at her request, asked Igor Talkov to perform first, since Aziza did not have time to prepare for the exit. Talkov called the singer's guard, Igor Malakhov, to his dressing room, and a verbal conflict occurred between them. After that, two guards and Igor Talkov took Igor Malakhov out of the dressing room. Talkov began to prepare for his performance, but a few minutes later, the administrator of his Lifebuoy group, Valery Shlyafman, ran up to him, shouting that Malakhov had taken out a revolver. Talkov pulled out a gas pistol from his bag, which he had acquired for self-defence, ran into the corridor and, seeing that his guards were at gunpoint of Igor Malakhov, fired three shots at him. Malakhov bent down, and the guards, taking advantage of this delay, began to neutralise him. Then he fired two shots, but one bullet hit the floor, and the second – into the box with the equipment. The guards began to beat the shooter, and, covering his head, he dropped his revolver. A few moments later, another shot rang out, which hit Igor Talkov in the chest. An hour later, when the ambulance team arrived, the doctors immediately stated biological death.

The prosecutor's office opened a criminal case. Igor Malakhov, who was put on the all-Union wanted list, voluntarily came to confess 10 days later. In December 1991, the charge of premeditated murder was dropped. After conducting examinations in April 1992, the investigation established that the last shot was made by Valery Schlyafman, Talkov's one-time manager. However, in February 1992, the defendant left for Israel, with which Russia did not have an extradition agreement at the time, and the murder case was suspended. In November 2018, the Investigative Committee resumed its investigation into the singer's murder.

== Aftermath ==
While Valery Schlyafman was suspected of the murder by a Russian court in 1992, he fled through Ukraine to Israel before he could be arrested. He remains in Israel to this day, insisting he is not guilty of the crime while Israel refuses to extradite him. Schlyafman and his supporters have claimed that the KGB orchestrated the murder.

In 1999, Talkov was honoured with his image portrayed on a Russian postage stamp. There is an Igor Talkov Museum in Moscow.

== Popular songs ==
- Clean Ponds (Russian: Чистые пруды)
- Summer Rain (Летний дождь)
- Russia (Россия)
- My Love (Моя любовь)
- Ex-Podesaul (Бывший подъесаул)
- At Your Window (У твоего окна)
- My Homeland (Родина моя)
- KPSS (КПСС)
- Scene (Сцена)
- Memory (Память)
- An Exemplary Boy (Примерный мальчик)
- Stop! I Think to Myself (Стоп! Думаю себе)
- Kremlin Wall (Кремлёвская стена)
- The Lifebuoy (Спасательный круг)
- Gentlemen Democrats (Господа демократы)
- Mr. President (Господин президент)
- I'll Be Back (Я вернусь)

== See also ==
- List of unsolved murders (1980–1999)
