= Treasure Island (1982 film) =

- Directed by: Vladimir Vorobyov
- Written by: Yuri Klavdiyev; Aleksandr Rodionov
- Starring: Fyodor Stukov; Oleg Borisov
- Narrated by: Vitaly Solomin
- Production company: Lenfilm
- Release date: 1982
- Running time: 183 minutes
- Country: Soviet Union
- Language: Russian

Treasure Island (Russian: Oстpoв сoкpoвищ) is a 1982 Soviet children's adventure film based on Robert Louis Stevenson's 1883 novel. Directed by Vladimir Vorobyov, it stars Fyodor Stukov and Oleg Borisov.

== Cast ==
- Oleg Borisov as Long John Silver
- Fyodor Stukov as Jim Hawkins
- Victor Kostetskiy as Dr. Livesey
- Vladislav Strzhelchik as Squire Trelawney
- Konstantin Grigoriev as Captain Smollett
- Leonid Markov as Billy Bones
- Georgy Teyh as Blind Pew
- Nikolai Karachentsov as Black Dog
- Olga Volkova as Jim's mother
- Valeri Zolotukhin as Ben Gunn
- Gennadi Yukhtin as Israel Hands
- Georgy Shtil as O'Brien
- Vladimir Vorobyov as George Merry
- Nikolai Kryukov as Tom Morgan
- Konstantin Vorobyov as Dick (Pastor) Johnson
