= Moscow Does Not Believe in Tears =

1980 Soviet romantic-comedy-drama film

Moscow Does Not Believe In Tears
- Theatrical release poster
- Directed by: Vladimir Menshov
- Written by: Valentin Chernykh
- Starring: Vera Alentova; Irina Muravyova; Raisa Ryazanova; Aleksey Batalov
- Cinematography: Igor Slabnevich
- Edited by: Yelena Mikhailova
- Music by: Sergey Nikitin
- Production company: Mosfilm
- Release date: 11 February 1980
- Running time: 148 minutes
- Country: Soviet Union
- Language: Russian

Moscow Does Not Believe in Tears (Russian: Москва слезам не верит, romanized: Moskva slezam ne verit) is a 1980 Soviet romantic comedy-drama film made by Mosfilm. It was written by Valentin Chernykh and directed by Vladimir Menshov. The leading roles were played by Vera Alentova and Aleksey Batalov. The film won the Academy Award for Best Foreign Language Film in 1981, one of three Soviet films to win the award.

== Plot ==
=== Part One ===
In 1958, three young women, Katerina, Lyudmila, and Antonina, live in Moscow in a workers' dormitory, having arrived from the provinces.

Katerina, serious and hardworking, works in a factory while studying at night to get admitted to a college. Antonina, a construction worker, dates her fellow co-worker Nikolay, a reserved but kind young man. Lyudmila, dynamic and vivacious, works in a bakery, but spends time in a university library in search for the opportunity to marry up.

When Katerina is asked to house-sit for her well-to-do Moscow relatives, Lyudmila, flirty and impetuous, invites herself along and convinces Katerina to throw a dinner party as a ploy to meet successful men. At the party, Lyudmila talks with Sergei, a rising ice hockey star, while Katerina meets Rudolf, a smooth talker who works as a cameraman for a national TV channel.

During Antonina and Nikolai's wedding, Lyudmila and Antonina learn that Katerina is pregnant. Rudolf refuses to marry Katerina and is not willing to help with finding an abortion clinic. His mother offers Katerina money, while telling her that they will not have her as a part of the family. Katerina rejects the money, telling her that she plans to have an abortion. In the next scene, her friends greet her with a newborn daughter, Aleksandra. The three friends and their guests celebrate the arrival of the baby in their dormitory room.

In the last scene of Part One, Katerina, exhausted, studies at night, with Aleksandra sleeping by her side. Going to bed, Katerina changes the alarm clock from 5:30am to 5:00am, and cries.

=== Part Two ===
In 1978, Katerina is a newly appointed CEO of a large factory. She drives a car, a sign of privileged status in the Soviet Union, and lives with her teenage daughter in a nice apartment. She, Lyudmila and Antonina are still close. Lyudmila has divorced Sergei, who has quit playing hockey because of problems with alcohol; she works at a dry-cleaning and still looks for a bridegroom (preferably a General). Antonina is still married to Nikolai; with three teenage children, they are a loving and harmonious family. Katerina dates a married man, but her private life is not happy.

Returning home on a local train, Katerina meets Gosha, who starts a conversation with her after she notices his dirty shoes. Gosha is an intelligent tool-and-die maker in a research institute, where his instrument maintenance skills are an enormously valued help to his scientist coworkers. Katerina starts dating him, yet she does not tell him that she is a factory CEO as Gosha believes that a woman should not make more money than her husband.

As their romance progresses, Rudolf, who changed his westernized name for a now-fashionable Russified Rodion, but still works as a TV cameraman, unexpectedly reenters Katerina's life, and tells her he wants to meet his daughter. Katerina curtly tells him that she does not want to see him again, but he shows up uninvited at her apartment and tells Gosha and Aleksandra about the interview, revealing Katerina's executive position (and high salary) to Gosha. Gosha's pride is hurt, and he leaves the apartment. Unable to stop him, Katerina reveals to Aleksandra that Rudolf is her father.

Gosha disappears from Katerina's life, and she becomes frantic. A week later, Lyudmila, Antonina, and Nikolai come to her apartment to comfort her. Nikolai gathers what little information Katerina knows about Gosha (which does not even include his last name) and sets off in search. Nikolai finds Gosha drinking alone, still stung by Katerina's "betrayal". Nikolai convinces Gosha to return home, and, alone with Katerina and Aleksandra, Gosha asks for a dinner. As he eats, Katerina watches him, saying "I've been looking for you for such a long time." "Eight days", Gosha replies, to which Katerina, with tears in her eyes, repeats, "I've been looking for you for such a long time."

== Rare distinctions ==
Moscow Does Not Believe in Tears is one of only four Russian films to have won the Academy Award for Best Foreign Language Film. The other three are War and Peace (1966–1967), Dersu Uzala (1975) and Burnt by the Sun (1994).

== Cast ==
- Vera Alentova – Katerina Aleksandrovna Tikhomirova ("Katya")
- Irina Muravyova – Lyudmila Sviridova ("Lyuda")
- Raisa Ryazanova – Antonina Buyanova ("Tosya")
- Aleksey Batalov – Georgy Ivanovich ("Gosha"), Katya's partner
- Aleksandr Fatyushin – Sergei Gurin ("Seryozha"), a hockey player, Lyuda's ex-husband
- Boris Smorchkov – Nikolai, Tosya's husband
- Viktor Uralsky – Mikhail Ivanovich, Nikolai's father
- Valentina Ushakova – Anna Nikitichna, Nikolai's mother
- Yuri Vasilyev – Rodion Rachkov ("Rudolph"), Aleksandra's father
- Yevgeniya Khanayeva – Rodion's mother
- Liya Akhedzhakova – Olga Pavlovna, single's club director
- Zoya Fyodorova – "Aunt" Pasha, dormitory secretary
- Natalya Vavilova – Aleksandra, Katya's daughter
- Oleg Tabakov – Vladimir, Katya's lover
- Vladimir Basov – Anton Kruglov, deputy chief of the central board
- Alexander Borodyansky – Gosha's friend
- Garri Bardin – chemical plant chief engineer

Cameo appearances:

- Andrei Voznesensky
- Innokenty Smoktunovsky
- Georgi Yumatov
- Leonid Kharitonov
- Tatyana Konyukhova
- Pavel Rudakov
- Veniamin Nechayev

== Reception ==
=== Response ===
Over 93 million Soviet viewers saw the film in the cinema, making it one of the most successful films in Soviet history. In 2021, a poll conducted by Russian Public Opinion Research Center voted it as the best Soviet film of all time among Russian viewers. Moscow Does Not Believe in Tears has an approval rating of 40% on review aggregator website Rotten Tomatoes, based on five reviews, and an average rating of 4.8/10. The film currently holds a rating of 8.0/10 on IMDb.

Then-U.S. president Ronald Reagan watched the film several times before his meetings with Mikhail Gorbachev, the general secretary of the Communist Party of the Soviet Union, in order to gain a better understanding of the "Russian soul".

=== Awards and nominations ===
Award	Category	Nominee(s)	Result
Academy Awards	Best Foreign Language Film	Soviet Union	Won
Berlin International Film Festival	Golden Bear	Vladimir Menshov	Nominated

== Background ==
- Moskva slezam ne verit, translated as "Moscow Does Not Believe in Tears,” is a Russian proverb meaning "don't complain, solve your problems by yourself." Variations on the proverb date to the time of Ivan the Terrible, and it has been used thematically in many Russian-language works, such as Alexander Bek’s novels about the defense of Moscow in 1941.
- Valentin Chernykh admitted that he received many proposals from Hollywood at that time, but he rejected all of them, since he thought that any remakes of the movie would fail.
- Vitaly Solomin, Vyacheslav Tikhonov, Oleg Yefremov, and Leonid Dyachkov auditioned for the part of Gosha. However, none of them convinced the director to take them, and he even wanted to play the main character himself, until he saw Aleksey Batalov in the film My Dear Man on television.
- It was also difficult to find someone apt for the part of Katerina. Many well known actresses such as Anastasiya Vertinskaya, Zhanna Bolotova, Irina Kupchenko, Natalya Sayko, Valentina Telichkina and Margarita Terekhova auditioned for the part, but most of them did not like the script, so the part eventually went to the director’s wife, Vera Alentova.

== Songs from the film ==
- Jamaica by Robertino
- Les Routiers by Yves Montand
- Bésame Mucho
- Satirical couplets ("The Diplomatic Couplets") from c.1954 by Pavel Rudakov and Veniamin Nechaev
- Daddy Cool by Boney M
- Давай закурим (Let's take a smoke) by Klavdiya Shulzhenko
- Александра (Aleksandra) by Sergey Nikitin and Tatyana Nikitina
- Диалог у новогодней ёлки (Dialogue by the New Year tree) by Sergey Nikitin and Tatyana Nikitina

== See also ==
- List of submissions to the 53rd Academy Awards for Best Foreign Language Film
- List of Soviet submissions for the Academy Award for Best International Feature Film
