= Estrada (performing arts genre) =

Russian type of performing arts

In Russian culture and in countries influenced by the Soviet Union, estrada is a kind of stage-based art of small performances, including such fields as singing, dance, circus on stage, illusionism, colloquial genre, parody, clownery. There is usually little psychological depth to the performances. The term derives from the French word estrade, a stage for performances, and is unrelated to the same Portuguese word estrada meaning road or highway.

Artists who perform in the estrada genre are called, in Russian, estrada artists or artists of estrada.

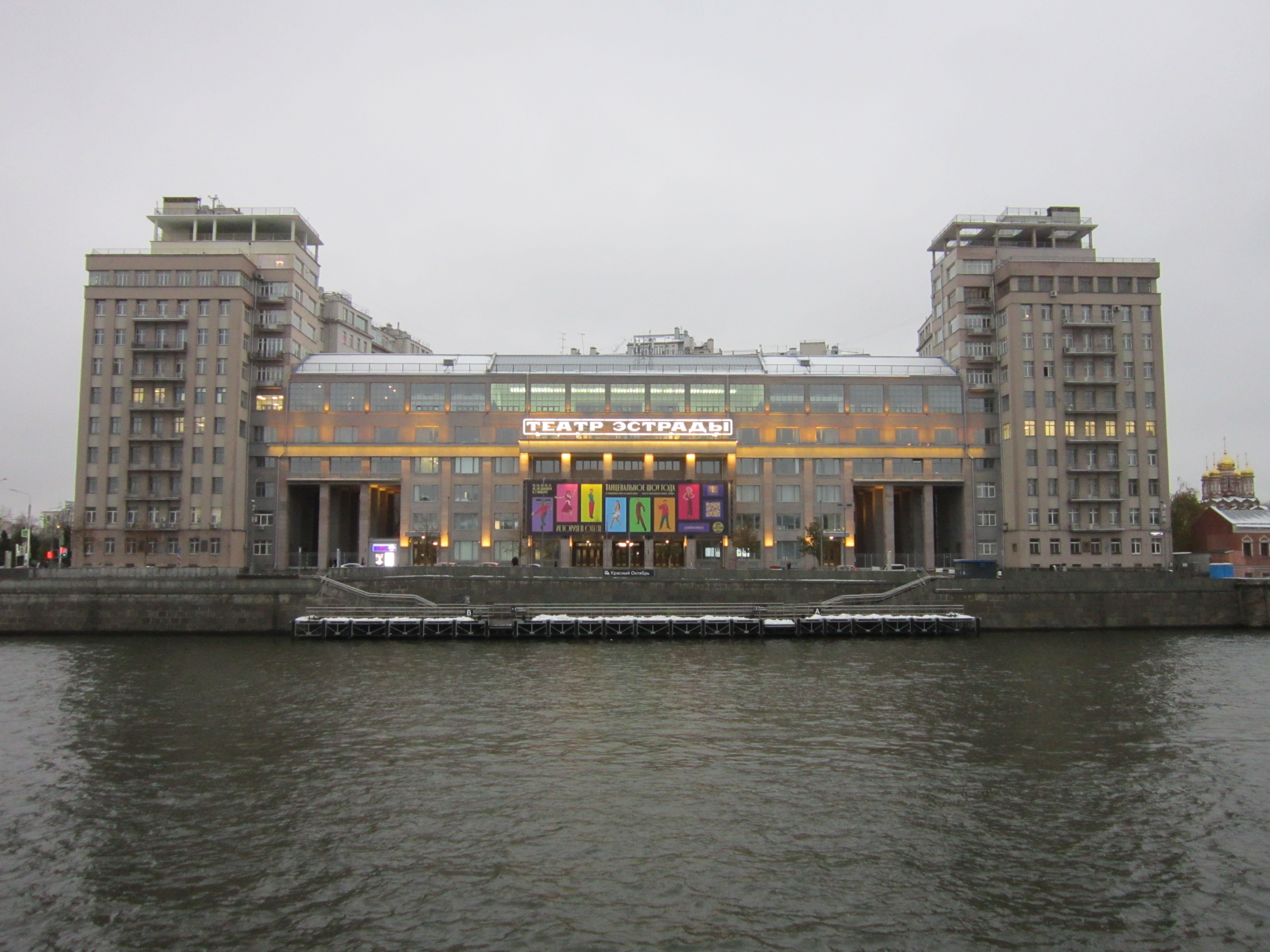
Moscow Estrada Theatre, 2023

There is a Moscow Estrada Theatre in Moscow, established in 1951.

== See also ==
- Cabaret
- Music hall
- Variety arts
