= Boris Sohn =

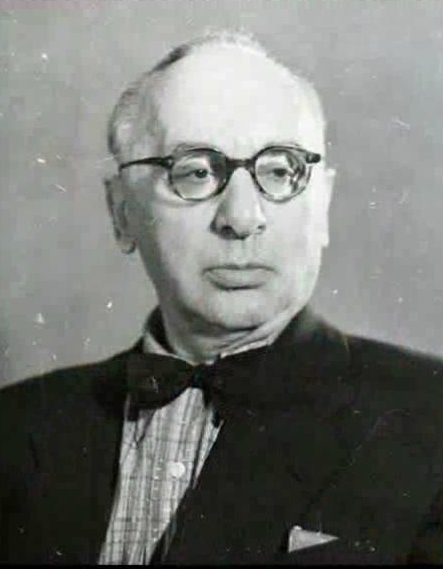
Boris Sohn

Boris Vulfovich Sohn (Russian: Борис Вульфович Зон; 10 [25] January 1898, Syzran — 10 June 1966, Leningrad) was a Soviet stage actor, theatre director and theatre educator. He was made an Honored Artist of the RSFSR in 1934.
