= Aleksandr Adabashyan =

Russian filmmaker and actor

- Александр Адабашьян
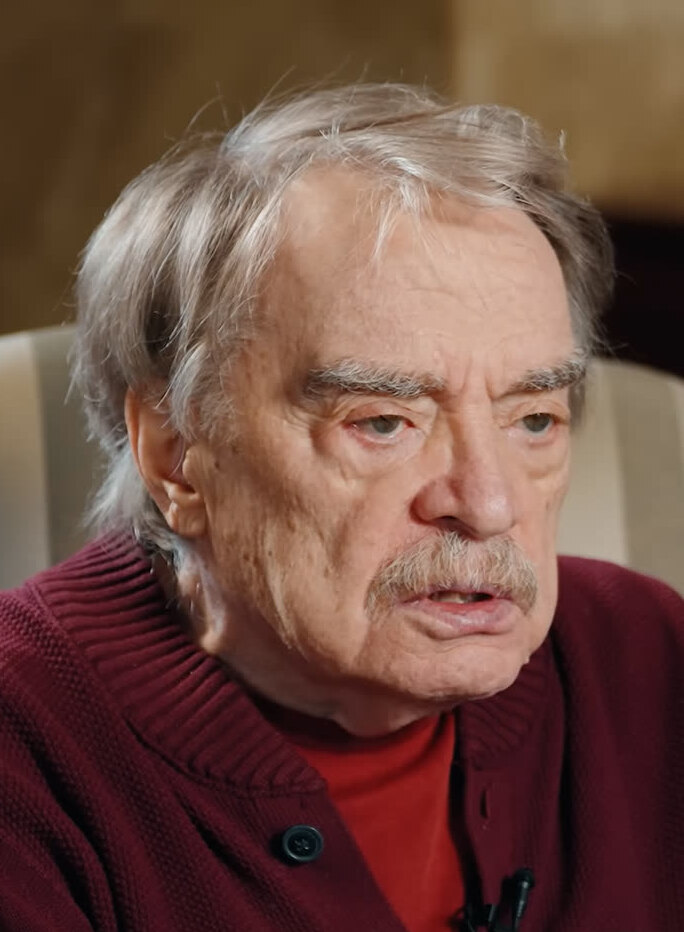
- Aleksandr Adabashyan in 2025
- Born: Aleksandr Artyomovich Adabashyan; 10 August 1945; Moscow, Russian SFSR, USSR
- Citizenship: USSR; Russia
- Education: Moscow Art and Industry College
- Occupations: Actor, filmmaker, screenwriter, painter
- Years active: 1968—present
- Height: 163 cm (5 ft 4 in)

Aleksandr Artyomovich Adabashyan (Russian: Алекса́ндр Артёмович Адабашья́н; born August 10, 1945, Moscow) is a Soviet and Russian film writer, artist, director and actor. His film career has spanned over 50 years, and he has been awarded Honored Artist of the RSFSR (1983) and Honored Artist of Russia (2016).

== Biography ==
Born in Moscow into a russified Armenian family of Artyom Adabashyan, an official at the Ministry of Construction Industry, and Valentina Barkhudarova, a teacher of German language. According to Aleksandr, he was raised inside the Russian culture, he doesn't speak Armenian language and he visited Yerevan only twice in his life. In 1962 he enrolled in the Stroganov Moscow State University of Arts and Industry, and in 1964 he went to serve in the army. In three years he returned and finished the art courses.

As a student he got acquainted with Nikita Mikhalkov and participated in his diploma film A Quite Day at the End of the War as a decorator. After that he turned into a regular Mikhalkov's collaborator, taking part in the majority of his movies as an art director, artist, screenwriter and actor (usually appearing in episodic roles). He also constantly worked with other film directors such as Georgiy Daneliya, Andrei Konchalovsky, Sergei Solovyov and Dunya Smirnova.

He directed two movies on his own: Mado, poste restante (which was nominated for the 1991 César Award as the best debut work) and Azazel mini-series, the first adaptation of Erast Fandorin's adventures. In addition, he made a career as a comedy actor, most famously portraying Barrymore in The Hound of the Baskervilles Soviet adaptation, also alongside Nikita Mikhalkov (who played Sir Henry Baskerville). Among his other notable roles is Timofeev in Five Evenings and Berlioz in The Master and Margarita.

Between 1997 and 1998 Adabashyan directed two operas: Boris Godunov for the Mariinsky Theatre and Khovanshchina for the La Scala opera house. He also worked as an interior designer in several Moscow restaurants.

Adabashyan has been married twice. His first wife was Marina Lebesheva, the sister of the acclaimed Russian cinematographer Pavel Lebeshev. His second wife is Ekaterina Shadrina, an assistant costume designer who also appeared in a small role in Mikhalkov's At Home Among Strangers. Together they have two daughters.

== Awards ==
- 1978 — Laureate of the State Prize of the Kazakh SSR Kulyash Baiseitova
- 1983 — Honored Painter of the RSFSR
- 1990 — Youth Jury Prize International Film Festival Cinema Europe in Ravenna for the movie Mado, poste restante
- 1991 — Nominated for the César Award for best debut work (the movie Mado, poste restante)
- 1991 — Prize Flayyano Silver Pegasus (Italy for best foreign scenario)
- 1993 — Fellini Prize for Best European scenario
- 2006 — Award VII Russian Festival comedy Smile, Russia! for the contribution to comedy
- 2013 — Special Jury Prize Film Festival Window to Europe in Vyborg (the film Dog Heaven)
- 2014 — Nominees for the Golden Eagle Award for Best Script (the film Dog Heaven)

== Selected filmography ==
Year	Title				
Year	Title	Role	Screenwriter	Artist	Director
1970	A Calm Day at the End of the War			✓	
1974	At Home Among Strangers	Brylov's messenger / nobleman		✓	
1975	A Slave of Love	film director		✓	
1977	An Unfinished Piece for Mechanical Piano		✓	✓	
1978	Siberiade	dealer		✓	
1978	Five Evenings	Timofeev	✓	✓	
1979	A Few Days from the Life of I.I. Oblomov	episode (uncredited)	✓	✓	
1981	Family Relations	Sanya the waiter / glazier		✓	
1981	The Hound of the Baskervilles	Barrymore			
1982	Flights in Dreams and Reality	sculpture			
1983	Without Witness			✓	
1986	Guard Me, My Talisman	Monsieur Dardye			
1987	Dark Eyes	medical staff (uncredited)	✓	✓	
1990	Mado, poste restante		✓		✓
1993	Nastya	official	✓		
1994	Like Two Crocodiles		✓		
2002	Azazel	episode (uncredited)			✓
2004	Fort Boyard (Russia)	Fouras			
2005	The Master and Margarita	Berlioz			
2007	12	bailiff			
2008	The Ghost	Alexandr the editor			
2008	Plus One	a man by the stall			
2008	Fathers and Sons		✓	✓	
2010	Burnt by the Sun 2	Igor the official			
2013	Ku! Kin-dza-dza	Abradox (voice)	✓		
2013	Sherlock Holmes	editor			
2013	Pyotr Leschenko. Everything That Was...	Paul			
2014	Sunstroke	cameraman			
2016	The Heritage of Love	Lev Chizh			
2016	Once Upon a Time There Were We	Danila	✓	✓	
