= Five Evenings =

1979 film by Nikita Mikhalkov

- Directed by: Nikita Mikhalkov
- Written by: Aleksandr Adabashyan; Nikita Mikhalkov; Aleksandr Volodin (play)
- Produced by: Willy Geller
- Starring: Stanislav Lyubshin; Lyudmila Gurchenko
- Cinematography: Pavel Lebeshev
- Edited by: Eleonora Praksina
- Music by: Eduard Artemyev; Yuliy Kim
- Production company: Mosfilm
- Release date: 1978
- Running time: 108 minutes
- Country: Soviet Union
- Language: Russian

Five Evenings (Russian: Пять вечеров, romanized: Pyat vecherov) is a Soviet romantic drama film by Nikita Mikhalkov in 1978 based on the same name play by Aleksandr Volodin.

== Plot ==
One autumn evening in 1958, Ilyin visits Moscow and, while at the home of his acquaintance Zoya, notices a familiar building he once lived in before the war. Drawn by nostalgia, he leaves Zoya briefly to see if his former landlady, Tamara, still lives there. Upon arriving, he finds Tamara living with her nephew Slavik, whose mother died during the war. Tamara, now a factory worker and party member, is reserved with Ilyin but allows him to stay in her spare room. To impress her, Ilyin falsely claims to be a chief engineer. They reminisce, and Ilyin meets Slavik, warning him to speak respectfully about Tamara. Later, while Tamara initially refuses to celebrate their reunion, she eventually joins in, rekindling a sense of camaraderie.

As the two grow closer, Ilyin confesses his desire to quit his job, become a driver, and move to Russia’s North, inviting Tamara to join him. Skeptical, she questions his ambition but subtly supports his independence. However, when Tamara leaves the apartment, Ilyin decides to depart without a farewell. She then visits his former classmate, Timofeyev, learning that Ilyin had dropped out of school after standing up to a corrupt official, subsequently finding fulfillment as a boxer and then a driver in the North. Timofeyev envies Ilyin’s courage and freedom, qualities Tamara begins to appreciate deeply. Ilyin later returns unexpectedly to Tamara, admitting his struggles and reaffirming his happiness in life. Tamara finally accepts his invitation to go wherever life takes them together, proud of his resilience. He falls asleep in her lap, and they find peace in each other's company once again.

== Cast ==
- Stanislav Lyubshin as Aleksandr (vocal by Sergey Nikitin)
- Lyudmila Gurchenko as Tamara
- Igor Nefyodov as Slavik
- Aleksandr Adabashyan as Timofeyev
- Valentina Telichkina as Zoya

== Trivia ==
This was actress Larisa Kuznetsova's debut film.

== Awards ==
- Valladolid International Film Festival — Best Actor (Stanislav Lyubshin)
- Soviet Screen Award — Best Actor (Stanislav Lyubshin)
- 55th place in the list of 100 best films according to Russian Guild of Film Critics
