= The Heritage of Love =

- Theatrical release poster
- Russian: Герой
- Directed by: Yuriy Vasilyev
- Written by: Nataliya Doroshkevich; Olga Pogodina-Kuzmina
- Produced by: Elmira Ainulova; Maria Juromskaya; Natalia Doroshkevich
- Starring: Dima Bilan; Svetlana Ivanova; Aleksandr Adabashyan; Aleksandr Baluev; Marat Basharov; Aleksandr Golovin; Jurgita Jurkute; Tatyana Lyutaeva; Viktor Nemets; Lilita Ozolina; Yulia Peresild
- Cinematography: Ramunas Greicius
- Music by: Eduard Artemyev
- Production companies: Fond Kino; Mosfilm
- Distributed by: Cultural Solidarity Media
- Release date: 31 March 2016
- Running time: 86 minutes
- Country: Russia
- Language: Russian
- Budget: $7 million

The Heritage of Love (Russian: Герой, Geroy, lit. "Hero") is a 2016 Russian romantic drama film inspired by a true story. It is set against the Russian Revolution and subsequent onset of the Russian Civil War, as well as modern-day Paris. The film is directed by Yuriy Vasilyev and written by Natalia Doroshkevich and Olga Pogodina-Kuzmina. The film stars Dima Bilan (in his first film role), Svetlana Ivanova, Aleksandr Adabashyan, Aleksandr Baluev, and Marat Basharov.

The film is based on actual historical events and was produced in honor of the "Year of Russian Cinema," with support from the Russian Military Historical Society (RVIO) and the St. Basil the Great Foundation, as well as state support from the Cinema Foundation of Russia and the Ministry of Culture of the Russian Federation.

== Plot ==
The film is set in 2016. Andrey Kulikov is a young machinist who is going to Paris to visit an old lady, and to buy the oldest Russian-made car, the Russo-Balt. While walking through Paris, Andrey sees a woman, Vera, and so starts the tale of two love stories, separated by three generations and one hundred years.

Later, when Andrey visits the Sainte-Geneviève-des-Bois Russian Cemetery he finds the grave of a young lady similar to the one he just met in Paris.

During his search to the past it becomes clear that Vera's and Andrey's fates are connected. His great-grandfather, Andrey Dolmatov, had been an officer in the White Army during the Russian Revolution and fell in love with Princess Vera Chernisheva in the last days of the Russian Empire and in the Russian Civil War.

== Cast ==
- Dima Bilan as Lieutenant of the Life Guard Horse Regiment Andrey Dolmatov / Andrey Kulikov, Dolmatov's great-grandson
- Svetlana Ivanova as Princess Vera Chernysheva / Vera Yezerskaya, Chernysheva's great-granddaughter
- Aleksandr Adabashyan as Lev Chij
- Aleksandr Baluev as Mikhail Tereshchenko / Michel
- Marat Basharov as Baron Ivan Karlovich von Liven
- Aleksandr Golovin as Repnin
- Jurgita Jurkute as Princess Irina Chernysheva, Vera Chernysheva's sister
- Tatyana Lyutaeva as Princess Olga Chernysheva, Vera Chernysheva's mother
- Vladislav Vetrov as Prince Alexander Chernyshev, Vera Chernysheva's father
- Viktor Nemets as Yefim
- Lilita Ozolina as Princess Yelizaveta Yezerskaya von Liven, Vera Chernysheva's niece
- Yulia Peresild as Masha Kulikova, Andrey Kulikov's great-grandmother
- Svetlana Polyakova as Countess Nadezhda Zubtsova, Vera Chernysheva's godmother
- Alexandre Vassiliev as the Russian landlord of the Paris apartment
- Petar Zekavica as Mikhailenko
- Mikolas Vildjunas as General Kornilov
- Yuri Vasilyev as the priest

== Production ==
=== Music ===
The musical score was composed by Eduard Artemyev, who has previously collaborated with Russian director Nikita Mikhalkov on numerous movies (At Home Among Strangers, An Unfinished Piece for a Player Piano, Burnt by the Sun, The Barber of Siberia, Sunstroke).

== Release ==
The film premiered in theaters in Russia on March 31, 2016; internationally on May 4, 2016; and in the United States in April 2016. Its television premiere took place on November 5, 2017, on Russia's Channel One.

== See also ==
- The Admiral
