= Long-Haired Wonder =

- Russian: Чудо с косичками
- Directed by: Viktor Titov
- Written by: Aleksandr Lapshin
- Starring: Irina Mazurkevich; Anna Zharova; Igor Yasulovich; Aleksandr Kalyagin; Naum Dymarsky
- Cinematography: Anatoli Nikolayev; Vladimir Nikolayev
- Edited by: Tamara Zubrova
- Music by: Vladislav Kazenin
- Release date: 1974
- Running time: 78 minute
- Country: Soviet Union
- Language: Russian

Long-Haired Wonder (Russian: Чудо с косичками) is a 1974 Soviet sports drama film directed by Viktor Titov.

The film tells the story of a young and very talented Soviet gymnast Olga Korbut, who was called Long-Haired Wonder.

== Plot ==
The film is structured as a report from a major international gymnastics tournament, focusing on the competition for first place in the individual all-around. The main contenders are Elsa Stram from East Germany and two Soviet athletes, Tatyana Malysheva and Svetlana Kropotova. Stram and Kropotova represent the classical style of gymnastics, while Malysheva, known as the "wonder with braids," challenges traditional norms with her ultra-modern and innovative approach alongside her coach. Following an injury, Malysheva has been absent from competition for over six months, during which the International Technical Committee introduced restrictions on ultra-risky elements. Despite the rules, Malysheva includes a difficult back tuck on the balance beam, impressing the audience, who are dismayed by her low score due to rule violations. During a break, the technical committee urges her coach to avoid the "Korbut loop" on the uneven bars, but he retorts, likening their ambition to the desire to show the world the possibility of flight. Meanwhile, Kropotova's coach convinces her that her simpler routine embodies the true essence of gymnastics, not circus-like stunts.

Tensions escalate during the vault event as the leaderboard solidifies. Malysheva debuts a challenging vault with a 360-degree turn, yet the judges refuse to score it. With one final attempt, the commentator notes she only needs a simple, flawless vault to secure victory. In a moment of decision, Malysheva consults her coach, who cryptically assures her that difficulties are fleeting, while her achievements will endure. Inspired, she performs another ultra-risky move. The judges, awed by her perseverance, award her a 9.9—the highest score of the competition.

== Cast ==
- Irina Mazurkevich as Tanya Malisheva (as I. Mazurkevich)
- Anna Zharova as Svetlana Kropotova (as A. Zharova)
- Igor Yasulovich
- Aleksandr Kalyagin
- Naum Dymarsky
- Nina Agapova as Yekaterina Andreyevna Burkova (as N. Agapova)
- Aleksandr Khaletsky as Mitya (as A. Khaletskiy)
- Yelena Bratslavskaya as Yelizabeta Sidelnikova (as Ye. Bratslavskaya)
- Mikaela Drozdovskaya
- Anatoli Kryzhansky
