= Funny People (1977 film) =

- Russian: Смешные люди!
- Directed by: Mikhail Shveitser
- Written by: Anton Chekhov; Mikhail Shvejtser
- Starring: Oleg Basilashvili; Vladimir Basov; Albert Filozov; Leonid Kuravlyov; Yevgeny Leonov
- Cinematography: Mikhail Agranovich
- Music by: Isaac Schwartz
- Production company: Mosfilm
- Release date: 1977
- Running time: 96 min.
- Country: Soviet Union
- Language: Russian

Funny People (Russian: Смешные люди!, romanized: Smeshnye lyudi!) is a 1977 Soviet comedy film directed by Mikhail Shveitser.

== Plot ==
The film takes place at a rehearsal of an unusual choir. The film tells the stories of funny singers.

== Cast ==
- Oleg Basilashvili as investigator Fedor Akimovich
- Vladimir Basov as deacon Avdiesov
- Albert Filozov as Ivan Ivanovich
- Leonid Kuravlyov as Denis Grigoriev
- Yevgeny Leonov as Alexey Alekseevich
- Avangard Leontiev as holy father Kuzma
- Vyacheslav Nevinny as Vasily Mikhailovich
- Boris Novikov as Pruzhina-Pruzhinsky, official in the choir
- Vladislav Strzhelchik as Pierre
- Elena Solovey as Pierre's wife
- Viktor Sergachyov as Mikhail Ivanovich, Count
