= Lady Macbeth of the Mtsensk District (novella) =

1865 novel by Nikolai Leskov

Lady Macbeth of the Mtsensk District (Russian: Леди Макбет Мценского уезда, Ledi Makbet Mtsenskogo uyezda) is an 1865 novella by Nikolai Leskov. It was originally published in Fyodor Dostoevsky's magazine Epoch.

Among its themes are the subordinate role expected from women in 19th-century European society, adultery, provincial life (thus drawing comparison with Flaubert's Madame Bovary) and the planning of murder by a woman, hence it having a title inspired by the Shakespearean character Lady Macbeth from his play Macbeth, and echoing the title of Turgenev's story Hamlet of the Shchigrovsky District (1859).

== Plot summary ==
The main character is a young wife of a merchant, Katerina Lvovna Izmailova. Her husband, Zinovy Borisovich, is constantly away on business and she is bored and lonely. Her husband is sterile, but he and his father blame Katerina.

A handsome young counterman, Sergei, woos for her attention, and Katerina falls in love with him. Gradually, her attraction develops into passion, and the lovers spend nights together while her husband is away.

She is ready to do anything for her lover, and a series of murders begins. At first, Katerina poisons her father-in-law to save Sergei, whom father-in-law has locked in the cellar. Later she kills her husband with the help of Sergei.

Finally, she smothers her young nephew, Fedya, with a pillow, as he might challenge her inheritance rights. However, at that moment, a crowd of men coming from the church burst in from the courtyard: one of them peered in through the window and saw the murder. The autopsy proves that Fedya died of suffocation. After the priest's words about the Last Judgment, Sergei confesses to murder. Katerina, however, coldly denies everything until she learns of Sergei's confession, after which she just as coldly confesses to the crime. The murderers are tried, flogged, and sent to katorga.

Sergey loses interest in Katerina, as she is no longer a wealthy merchant's wife. He becomes attracted to another prisoner, Sonetka (Sonya), flirting with her in front of Katerina, mocking Katerina's love. In the finale, Katerina grabs Sonetka and drowns with her in Volga.

== Translations into English ==
- A. E. Chamot (1922)
- George H. Hanna (1958)
- David McDuff (1988)
- Robert Chandler (2003)
- Richard Pevear and Larissa Volokhonsky (2013)

== Adaptations ==
- Opera: the 1934 opera of the same name by Dmitri Shostakovich
- Ballet: Lady Macbeth '77 (Katarina Izmailova) by Yugoslav composer Rudolf Brucci
- Film: the 1962 Yugoslavian film Sibirska Ledi Magbet (Siberian Lady Macbeth) directed by Andrzej Wajda
- Film: the 1989 Soviet film Lady Macbeth of the Mtsensk District by Roman Balayan
- Film: 1994 Katya Ismailova by Valery Todorovsky
- Film: the 2016 British film by William Oldroyd, Lady Macbeth.
