= A Few Days from the Life of I. I. Oblomov =

- Original Polish film poster
- Directed by: Nikita Mikhalkov
- Written by: Aleksandr Adabashyan; Ivan Goncharov; Nikita Mikhalkov
- Starring: Oleg Tabakov; Elena Solovey; Yuri Bogatyryov
- Cinematography: Pavel Lebeshev
- Music by: Eduard Artemyev
- Distributed by: Mosfilm
- Release date: 1980
- Running time: 140 minutes
- Country: Soviet Union
- Language: Russian

A Few Days from the Life of I. I. Oblomov (Russian: Несколько дней из жизни И. И. Обломова, translit. Neskolko dney iz zhizni I. I. Oblomova) is a Soviet historical comedy/drama film directed by Nikita Mikhalkov. It was released by Mosfilm in 1980. The film's plot is based on the novel Oblomov (Russian: Обломов), written by Ivan Goncharov, which tells the story of Ilya Ilyich Oblomov, a middle-aged nobleman living in 19th-century Saint Petersburg. This central character exemplifies the superfluous man concept found in 19th-century Russian literature.

== Plot ==
The film begins in 19th-century Saint Petersburg, and examines the life of Ilya Ilyich Oblomov, a middle-aged Russian nobleman. Slothful and seemingly unhappy, Oblomov spends much of the beginning of the film sleeping and being attended to by his servant, Zakhar. In an attempt to get him more active, Andrei Ivanovich Stoltz, a Russian/German businessman and close friend, frequently takes Oblomov along with him to social events. Oblomov is introduced to a cultured woman named Olga, a friend of Stoltz. When Stoltz leaves the country, Olga is left with the task of civilizing and culturing Oblomov while he lives nearby. Olga and Oblomov eventually fall in love, but upon Stoltz's return, Oblomov moves back into town, eventually severing ties with Olga. Stoltz and Olga eventually marry, and Oblomov subsequently marries the woman with whom he was living, Agafya Matveyevna Psehnitsyna. The two have a son, and although Agafya has two children from a previous relationship, Oblomov treats them both as if they were his own. Oblomov is satisfied with his life, although it "lack[s] the poetic and those bright rays which he imagined were to be found."

== Superfluous man and Oblomovism ==
In the Ivan Goncharov novel, Ilya Ilyich Oblomov is considered an excellent example of the "superfluous man" concept of 1800s' Russian literature. Alienated and let down by the world around him, the "superfluous man" character is often considered an outsider at odds with society. In both the novel and the film, Oblomov demonstrates this "superfluity" as an ineffective member of Russia's much criticized aristocracy. Goncharov referred to his character's passivity as "Oblomovism", and the term has since been associated with characters who possess Oblomov's apathy and membership in Russia's upper class.

== Cast ==
Actor	Role
Oleg Tabakov	Ilya Ilyich Oblomov
Yuri Bogatyryov	Andrei Ivanovich Stoltz
Andrei Popov	Zakhar
Elena Solovey	Olga
Avangard Leontiev	Alexeyev
Andrei Razumovsky	Ilya as a child
Oleg Kozlov	Stoltz as a child
Yelena Kleshchevskaya	Katya
Galina Shostko	Olga's aunt
Gleb Strizhenov	The Baron
Yevgeny Steblov	Oblomov's father
Yevgeniya Glushenko	Oblomov's mother
Nikolai Pastukhov	Stoltz's father
