= ResuRection =

2001 single by PPK

Single by PPK

from the album Reload
- Released: 26 November 2001
- Recorded: November 1999
- Genre: Trance
- Length: 3:12
- Label: PPK Management (Russia); Perfecto
- Songwriters: Edward Artemiev; Alexander Polyakov
- Producer: Alexander Polyakov

PPK singles chronology
"Hey DJ!" (2001)	"ResuRection" (2001)	"Reload" (2002)

"ResuRection" (Russian: Воскрешение, pronounced [vəskrʲɪˈʂɛnʲɪje], lit. 'Resurrection') is a song by Russian trance music group PPK. It was released in November 2001 as the lead single from their debut album, Reload. The melody is based on the original melody «Поход» ("Crusade") written by Eduard Artemyev for the 1979 Soviet movie Siberiade.

The song was the first by a Russian act to enter the top 10 of the UK Singles Chart, peaking at number three in December 2001 and earning a silver certification from the British Phonographic Industry (BPI). Elsewhere, the song reached the top 10 in Flanders, Ireland, and the Netherlands while also charting in Australia, Finland, and Wallonia. In the United States, the song peaked at number 26 on the Billboard Dance Club Play chart in April 2002. In 2021, the song was ranked number 70 in A State of Trance's "Trance Top 1000" list.

== Background ==
Paul Oakenfold signed "ResuRection" to his label Perfecto Records upon hearing it when he was playing a set at Gorky Park in Moscow. During an episode of his Planet Perfecto Podcast in January 2021, Oakenfold revealed that PPK handed him the record, which he listened to on his headphones, and signed the record immediately.

== Track listings ==
Russian CD and cassette single
No.	Title	Length
1.	"Воскрешение (ResuRection)" (Space Club mix)	8:04
2.	"Воскрешение (ResuRection)" (Wellenrausch remix)	6:50
3.	"Воскрешение (ResuRection)" (MaUVe remix)	7:59
4.	"Воскрешение (ResuRection)" (Trailer Trash remix)	8:20
5.	"Воскрешение (ResuRection)" (Perfecto remix)	7:33
6.	"Воскрешение (ResuRection)" (Robots outro)	1:43
7.	"Воскрешение (ResuRection)" (radio edit)	3:14

UK CD single
No.	Title	Length
1.	"ResuRection" (radio mix)	3:14
2.	"ResuRection" (Trailer Trash remix)	8:20
3.	"ResuRection" (The Perfecto edit)	7:33

UK 12-inch single
No.	Title	Length
1.	"ResuRection" (Space Club mix)	8:04
2.	"ResuRection" (Wellenrausch remix)	6:50
3.	"ResuRection" (Robots outro)	1:43

UK cassette single
No.	Title	Length
1.	"ResuRection" (radio mix)	3:14
2.	"ResuRection" (Wellenrausch remix)	6:50

Australian and New Zealand single
No.	Title	Length
1.	"ResuRection" (radio mix)	3:14
2.	"ResuRection" (Space Club mix)	8:04
3.	"ResuRection" (Trailer Trash remix)	8:20
4.	"ResuRection" (The Perfecto edit)	7:33
5.	"ResuRection" (Robots outro)	1:43
6.	"ResuRection" (Wellenrausch remix)	6:50

== Charts ==
=== Weekly charts ===
Chart (2001–2002)	Peak position
Australia (ARIA)	36
Belgium (Ultratop 50 Flanders)	9
Belgium (Ultratop 50 Wallonia)	39
Europe (Eurochart Hot 100)	15
Finland (Suomen virallinen lista)	15
Greece (IFPI)	4
Ireland (IRMA)	8
Ireland Dance (IRMA)	1
Netherlands (Dutch Top 40)	2
Netherlands (Single Top 100)	5
Romania (Romanian Top 100)	61
Scotland Singles (OCC)	3
UK Singles (OCC)	3
UK Dance (OCC)	2
UK Indie (OCC)	1
US Dance Club Play (Billboard)	26

=== Year-end charts ===
Chart (2001)	Position
UK Singles (OCC)	70

Chart (2002)	Position
Netherlands (Dutch Top 40)	55
Netherlands (Single Top 100)	76
UK Singles (OCC)	193

== Certifications ==
Region	Certification	Certified units/sales
Greece (IFPI Greece)	Gold	10,000^{^}
United Kingdom (BPI)	Silver	200,000^{^}
^{^} Shipments figures based on certification alone.

== Release history ==
Region	Date	Format(s)	Label(s)	Ref(s).
Russia	26 November 2001	CD; cassette	PPK Management; Perfecto	
United Kingdom	26 November 2001	12-inch vinyl; CD; cassette	Perfecto	
Australia	11 February 2002	CD	Perfecto; Festival Mushroom	
