= Aleksandr Trofimov (actor) =

- Born: 18 March 1952 (age 74); Moscow, RSFSR, USSR
- Occupation: Actor
- Years active: 1974 — present

Aleksandr Alekseevich Trofimov (Russian: Алекса́ндр Алексе́евич Трофи́мов, born 18 March 1952 in Moscow) is a Soviet and Russian actor of theater and cinema, Honored Artist of Russia (1992), People's Artist of Russia (2013), leading actor of the Moscow's Taganka Theatre.

== Biography ==
Aleksandr Trofimov was born in a family that was in no way associated with the theater. Since 1969, he worked as a technician of the scene of an officer club in the Malinovsky Military Armored Forces Academy. Since 1971, he became head of the youth studio at the national theater of the silk factory in Naro-Fominsk. In 1974, he graduated from the Boris Shchukin Theatre Institute and entered the troupe of the Taganka Theater. Trofimov chose this theater when he saw Vladimir Vysotsky in the play A Good Man from Sezuan. On the stage of the Taganka Theater, the actor has been playing for many years and is engaged in a variety of performances. The most popular role being Yeshua in the Yuri Lyubimov production Master and Margarita.

In his film career, the main director considers Mikhail Schweitzer, who starred in three films - Little Tragedies, Dead Souls and Kreutzer Sonata. However, the most popular role was played by the role of Cardinal Richelieu in the three-part musical film D'Artagnan and Three Musketeers, although initially he had to play in this picture the episodic role of the English fanatic Felton.

Currently, Aleksandr Trofimov is periodically invited to act in films for small roles. He is one of the lead actors in the Taganka Theater and goes with the theater on tour outside the country. He almost always refuses to interview, about his past work.

External image
- Aleksandr Trofimov as Richelieu

== Selected filmography ==
- D'Artagnan and Three Musketeers (1978) as Cardinal Richelieu (voiced by Mikhail Kozakov)
- Little Tragedies (1979) as Walsingham
- Dead Souls (1984) as Nikolai Gogol
- Kreutzer Sonata (1987) as The Fellow Passenger
- Peter Pan (1987) as Captain Hook
- The Suicide (1990) as Aristarkh Dominikovich
