= An Unfinished Piece for Mechanical Piano =

- French film poster
- Directed by: Nikita Mikhalkov
- Screenplay by: Aleksandr Adabashyan; Nikita Mikhalkov
- Story by: Anton Chekhov
- Based on: Platonov by Anton Chekhov; Various short stories by Anton Chekhov
- Starring: Aleksandr Kalyagin; Elena Solovey; Yevgeniya Glushenko
- Cinematography: Pavel Lebeshev
- Edited by: Lyudmila Yelyan
- Music by: Eduard Artemyev
- Production company: Mosfilm
- Release date: September 5, 1977
- Running time: 103 minutes
- Country: Soviet Union
- Language: Russian

An Unfinished Piece for Mechanical Piano (Russian: Неоконченная пьеса для механического пианино, romanized: Neokonchennaya pyesa dlya mekhanicheskogo pianino) is a 1977 Soviet drama film directed by Nikita Mikhalkov, who also co-stars. It is based on Anton Chekhov's Platonov, as well as several of his other short stories. It was filmed at Pushchino-Na-Oke (Artsebashev Estate), Pushchino, Russia, which was dilapidated in the film and is now abandoned.

== Plot ==
In the early twentieth century, members of the Russian gentry gather at the rural estate of Anna Petrovna Voynitseva, a general's widow. Among the guests are Dr. Triletsky, the creditor Mr. Petrin, Porfiry Semyonovich Glagolev (an admirer of Anna Petrovna), and neighbors Mikhail Vasilyevich Platonov and his wife, Sashenka. Also present are another creditor, Pavel Petrovich Shcherbuk, his daughters, and his nephew, Petechka. Voynitseva's stepson, Serge, introduces the group to his young wife, Sofia, whom Mikhail recognizes as a former love.

As the day progresses, relationships develop, raising questions about where these newfound connections will lead. The guests play games and entertainments like forfeits, while Platonov repeatedly brings up the theme of human insignificance. During the evening fireworks, Mikhail and Sofia share an intimate moment, rekindling their past affection. Sofia feels ready to leave her husband for a "pure new life" with Mikhail, but he hesitates. Conflicted, he impulsively jumps from a low riverbank, only to find the water shallow. Sashenka, tearfully, confesses her love to Platonov.

The film ends with all characters gathering at dawn by the river meadow, concluding with a shot of Petechka sleeping, turning away from the rising sun's first light.

== Cast ==
- Aleksandr Kalyagin: Mikhail Vassilyevich Platonov
- Elena Solovey: Sophia Yegorovna
- Yevgeniya Glushenko: Sashenka
- Antonina Shuranova: Anna Petrovna Voinitseva
- Yuri Bogatyryov: Sergey Pavlovich Voinitsev
- Oleg Tabakov: Pavel Petrovich Shcherbuk
- Nikolai Pastukhov: Porfiry Semyonovich Glagolyev
- Pavel Kadochnikov: Ivan Ivanovich Triletsky
- Nikita Mikhalkov: Nikolai Ivanovich Triletsky
- Anatoli Romashin: Gerasim Kuzmich Petrin
- Natalya Nazarova: Verochka
- Kseniya Minina: Lizochka
- Sergey Nikonenko: Yakov
- Sergei Guryev: Petechka (as Seryozha Guryev)

== Reception ==
=== Critical response ===
An Unfinished Piece for Mechanical Piano has an approval rating of 86% on review aggregator website Rotten Tomatoes, based on 7 reviews, and an average rating of 8.00/10.
