= Lady Macbeth of the Mtsensk District (film) =

- Directed by: Roman Balayan
- Written by: Roman Balayan; Pavel Finn
- Starring: Natalya Andrejchenko; Aleksandr Abdulov; Nikolai Pastukhov; Tatyana Kravchenko
- Cinematography: Pavel Lebeshev
- Music by: Evsey Evseyev
- Production company: Mosfilm
- Release date: 1989
- Running time: 76 minutes
- Country: Soviet Union
- Language: Russian

Lady Macbeth of the Mtsensk District (Russian: Леди Макбет Мценского уезда, romanized: Ledi Makbet Mtsentskogo uyezda) is a 1989 Soviet drama film directed by Roman Balayan, based on the eponymous novella by Nikolai Leskov.

== Plot ==
Katerina Izmailova is a beautiful wife of a rich merchant. Katerina, who is always alone and suffers from idleness, gets herself a young lover, Sergei. Soon their relationship progresses to the fact that they are forced to kill her husband Katerina, who discovers infidelity.

== Cast ==
- Natalya Andrejchenko - Katerina Izmailova
- Aleksandr Abdulov - Sergey
- Nikolai Pastukhov - Zinovy Borisovich
- Tatyana Kravchenko - Aksinya
- Oleg Ilyukhin - Fedya
- Elena Kolchugina - Sonnetka
- Natalia Potapova - Fiona
