= Andjei Petras =

Russian composer (born 1972)

Andjei Petras (born August 2, 1972) is a Russian composer, a director, and a scriptwriter. Winner of the Grand Prix of the festival FIPA for the original music (Franz+Polina), the National Film Critics Award "The White Elephant" in the category "Best Music Score" ("Short Stories").

== Biography ==
Petras was born in Leningrad. In 1995 he graduated from LITMO (known today as ITMO University); his specialization was the optical physics. Since his childhood, he was interested in music. He graduated from a music school and a jazz school in a piano class. Andjei learned to play many musical instruments on his own, such as a guitar, a bass guitar, percussion.

In 2000 Andjei created the musical project "Lions Love the Sun" with his friend and musician Roman Petrov. This project was his debut as an established multi-instrumentalist: he composed all music by himself. Despite an exclusively low budget (US$70), the first work of the duet, the movie “Dances for those …” immediately got into the rigid rotation on MTV Russia, Muz-TV and other Russian television channels.

In 2004, at the Gorky Film Studio, Andjei Petras made a short plot ”Mind mates” for “Eralash”, the most popular series for youth and children in Russia. Having received a positive experience of working with a film crew, a skilled producer (Boris Grachevsky) and a cameraman (Alexander Mochilsky), Andjei Petras came back to St. Petersburg. During this period he shot videos for other performers, wrote music for various theatrical performances and advertisements.

The gain of the tender for writing of the original music to a movie by the director Mikhail Segal, “Franz+Polina” opened new horizons for Andjei Petras: serious soundtracks performed by a symphonic orchestra. The music recording was made by the State Orchestra of Cinematography under the management of Sergey Skripka, in the main ton studio at "Mosfilm". Later Andjei Petras received a Grand-prix for the original music to the movie “Franz+Polina” at the Festival of Audiovisual Programs FIPA in France.

In 2011 Andjej Petras wrote a soundtrack to the short film "Mir krepezha" which received further a prestigious award - Grand-Prix «Kinotavr. The Short Meter» also was invited in the international Future Shorts Russia program. After success of the film it was decided to shoot the feature film, having included in it other stories of the director and screenwriter Mikhail Segal. As a result, in 2012 Andjei presented new symphonic orchestra soundtrack - to the film "Stories". "Stories" are four histories with the unpredictable outcome, four genres of cinema: absurdist comedy, social satire, thriller, melodrama. Hire of the film is planned for October–November, 2012. The main film distributor is Walt Disney Studios Sony Pictures Releasing CIS (WDSSPR). The film have passed selection round of the XXIII Open Russian Film Festival "Kinotavr", was presented in the main competitive program and received prestigious prizes - Diploma of the Guild of Film Critics and Film Scholars "White Elephant" and Gorin' Prize for Best Script (Mikhail Segal). Before hiring of the film producers are thinking to present the film at Moscow International Film Festival (MIFF) and another film festivals.

Among awards and awards of movies with his original music there is Gran-prix for the original soundtrack at The XX Festival of audio visual program FIPA in Biarritz (France). Next music works of Andjei Petras (Short Stories, Fastener Solutions, Le Moutons, Paratrooper's Day) received many prestigious Russian and International prizes and were official participants at Montreal Film Festival, London Film Festival, Shanghai Film Festival and other famous festivals around the world.

Today Andjei Petras writes scripts and music; he develops the concepts of new musical and cinema projects, while tirelessly opening new in himself and world around.

== Filmography ==
Composer
2005 – Extreme penalty (TV)
2006 – Franz+Polina
2006 – Clinic (TV)
2011 – Fastener Solutions
2012 – Short Stories (Rasskazy)
2013 – Le Moutons
2013 – Paratrooper's Day (Den Desantnika)

Director
2013 – Paratrooper's Day (Den Desantnika)

Screenwriter
2007 – Sculptor of death (Bouchard) (TV)
2013 – Paratrooper's Day (Den Desantnika)

Producer
2013 – Paratrooper's Day (Den Desantnika)

== Awards ==
2007 — Franz+Polina — Grand-prix for the original soundtrack at The XX Festival of audio visual program FIPA (Biarritz, France)
2012 — Short Stories (Rasskazy) — National Prize of film critics and media "White Elephant" in the category “Best Music Score” (Moscow, Russia)
2013 — Paratrooper's Day — The “Nikolay Ovsyannikov” creative support award at The international Film Festival “Festival of Festivals" (St. Petersburg, Russia)
2013 — Paratrooper's Day — Special Prize of Film Critics "Silver snow goggles" at the 1st International Yakutsk Film Festival (Yakutsk, Russia)

== Movie awards & festivals ==
2007 — Franz+Polina — Grand-prix for the best movie at The Festival of audio visual program FIPA (Biarritz, France)
2007 — Franz+Polina — Prize-winner at The XVI Cottbus International Film Festival (Cottbus, Germany)
2007 – Franz+Polina– Official participant of the World Film Festival Montreal (Montreal, Canada)
2007 — Fastener Solutions (short) — Grand-prix for the best movie at The XXII Open Russian Festival “KINOTAVR” in the program “Kinotavr. The Short Meter”
2011 — Fastener Solutions (short) — Special Prize FUTURE SHORTS at The XXII Open Russian Festival “KINOTAVR”
2012 — Short Stories (Rasskazy) — Grand-prix for the best movie at The Russian Festival “Viva Cinema of Russia!” (St.Petersburg, Russia)
2012 — Short Stories (Rasskazy) — Special Critics Award “For creation a single and original picture of world in four novels” at The Film Festival “Amur Autumn” (Blagoveschensk, Russia)
2012 — Short Stories (Rasskazy) — People's Choice Award at The International Film Festival "Pacific Meridians" (Vladivostok, Russia)
2012 — Short Stories (Rasskazy) — Official participant of the World Film Festival Montreal (Montreal, Canada), out-of-competition screening in the program “Focus On World Cinema”
2012 — Short Stories (Rasskazy) — Official participant of the London Film Festival (London, UK)
2013 — Short Stories (Rasskazy) — Special Prize “Golden Joker MAXIM Jameson2013” for the greatest contribution to the world treasury of satire and humor in the category “Movies” (Moscow, Russia)
