= The Kreutzer Sonata (1987 film) =

- Directed by: Mikhail Shveytser; Sofiya Milkina
- Written by: Mikhail Shveytser; Leo Tolstoy (novella)
- Produced by: Maria Zakharova
- Starring: Oleg Yankovskiy; Aleksandr Trofimov
- Cinematography: Mikhail Agranovich
- Edited by: Lyudmila Feiginova
- Music by: Sofia Gubaidulina
- Production company: Mosfilm
- Release date: 1987
- Running time: 158 minutes
- Country: Soviet Union
- Language: Russian

The Kreutzer Sonata (Russian: Крейцерова соната, romanized: Kreytserova sonata) is a 1987 Soviet romantic drama film directed by Mikhail Shveytser, based on Leo Tolstoy's 1889 novella The Kreutzer Sonata. Tolstoy's novella was itself named after Beethoven's Kreutzer Sonata.

== Plot ==
Vasily Pozdnyshov, a respected, honorable man known as a loving husband and caring father, confesses to a fellow train passenger how he became a brutal murderer of his wife, driven by a surge of jealousy after suspecting her of infidelity. In a fit of rage, he stabbed her with a Damascus blade.

Pozdnyshov recounts the events that led him to kill his wife, insisting he genuinely loved her. She was poor and had no influential family, and he did everything to make her happy. Yet, from the beginning of their marriage, things went awry. His wife was quiet, often melancholic, and frequently wept despite his devotion. Her only joy seemed to come from the company of a charming violinist. Initially, Pozdnyshov saw no harm and even left them alone together, but on returning, he found her with the musician. Enraged, Pozdnyshov drove the violinist away and, overcome by jealousy, seized a dagger and killed his unfaithful wife.

== Cast ==
- Oleg Yankovsky as Poznyshev
- Aleksandr Trofimov as The Fellow Passenger
- Irina Seleznyova as Liza
- Dmitriy Pokrovsky as Trukhachevsky
- Alla Demidova as The Lady
- Lidiya Fedoseyeva-Shukshina as Liza's mother
- Aleksandr Kalyagin as passenger
- Mikhail Gluzsky as passenger
- Olga Tokareva as Liza's sister
- Nina Agapova as Leocadia Petrovna
- Yuri Volyntsev as gentleman in public places
