= Lone Wolf (1978 film) =

1978 Soviet drama film by Roman Balayan

- DVD cover
- Directed by: Roman Balayan
- Written by: Roman Balayan; Ivan Mikolaychuk; Ivan Turgenev
- Starring: Mikhail Golubovich
- Cinematography: Vilen Kalyuta
- Edited by: Yelena Lukashenko
- Music by: Volodymyr Huba
- Production company: Dovzhenko Film Studios
- Release date: 1978
- Running time: 77 minutes
- Country: Soviet Union
- Language: Russian

Lone Wolf (Russian: Бирю́к, romanized: Biryuk) is a 1978 Soviet drama film directed by Roman Balayan. It was a part of the Official Selection section at the 28th Berlin International Film Festival. Ranks 75-80th in the list of 100 best films in the history of Ukrainian cinema.

The premiere took place in August 1978. The film was released in a limited release 191 copies. The film was seen by 1.3 million viewers.

== Plot ==
Peasant serf Thomas is entrusted with protecting the forest. Thomas has to catch serfs like himself, who come to the forest to hunt or cut wood without the permission of the master. Unsurprisingly the villagers do not like him and nickname him "Biryuk" for his surly and unsociable character. But in reality Thomas is a kind and conscientious man who lives with his young daughter Ulithi a simple life. Utterly devoted to the woods and trying to protect every tree, the main character is mistakenly killed by a gentleman's bullet, who came to the woods to shoot birds and wild boars.

== Cast ==
- Mikhail Golubovich as Biryuk (Thomas)
- Oleg Tabakov as Bersenev
- Yelena Khrol (credited as Lena Khrol) as Ulita
- Yury Dubrovin as first man
- Alexey Zaytsev as second man
- Irina Borisova as episode
- Sergei Brzhestovskiy as episode
- Anatoliy Mateshko as episode
- Vira Misevych as Sophie
- Silviya Sergeichikova as episode
