= Mado, Hold for Pick Up =

- Directed by: Aleksandr Adabashyan
- Written by: Aleksandr Adabashyan
- Produced by: Sylvette Desmeuzes-Balland
- Starring: Marianne Groves; Oleg Yankovsky; Jean-Pierre Darroussin; Isabelle Gélinas; Bernard Freyd
- Cinematography: Levan Paatashvili
- Music by: Jean-Louis Valero
- Production companies: Barnaba Films; Films A2
- Distributed by: Imperia Distribution
- Release date: 3 October 1990
- Running time: 96 minutes
- Languages: Russian; French

Mado, Hold for Pick Up (French: Mado, poste restante; Russian: Мадо, до востребования) is a 1990 French-Soviet romantic drama, and the directorial debut of Aleksandr Adabashyan. The film is based on the novel Mado by Simone Arèse.

== Plot ==
In a French provincial town where everyone knows each other for years and nothing ever happens, lives a young overweight woman by the name of Mado (Marianne Groves). She works as a mail carrier. Mado also teaches at a local school, where she tells fables to children. She is innocent and pure like a child and is dreaming of a beautiful prince. One day director Jean-Marie Zeleni (Oleg Yankovsky) comes to the village to search for locations for his new film, and thus becomes the "prince" for Mado. She immediately invites him to dinner, but realizing her unattractiveness, takes with herself her friend Germain (Isabelle Gélinas), a local prostitute. The slim and charming Germain immediately evokes the director's liking, and Mado can only observe their relationship. Then it turns out that the object of Mado's girlish dreams is a failed film director who shoots now commercials instead of feature films. Having filmed the next ad, he leaves, and Mado has only to watch from afar his touching farewell to Germain. From desperation she decides to drown herself, but then sets this thought aside and only watches from the river as the people of the village begin to be really worried about her.

== Cast ==
- Marianne Groves as Mado
- Oleg Yankovsky as director Jean-Marie Zeleni
- Jean-Pierre Darroussin as shepherd
- Isabelle Gélinas as Germain
- Bernard Freud as the priest
- Michel Vinogradov as Henri Lamont
- Olivier Pajot as Belfour
- André Pomarat as Perduvent

== Awards ==
- 1990 — Special Prize at the Cannes Film Festival Prospect of French cinema
- 1990 — Prize of the Youth Jury - Aleksandr Adabashyan, IFF Europe Cinema in Ravenna
