= The Stationmaster (1972 film) =

1972 film by Sergei Solovyov

- Directed by: Sergei Solovyov
- Written by: Sergei Solovyov; Alexander Pushkin
- Produced by: Viktor Tsirul
- Starring: Nikolai Pastukhov; Nikita Mikhalkov; Marianna Kushnerova
- Narrated by: Gennady Shumsky (on behalf of Ivan Belkin)
- Cinematography: Leonid Kalashnikov
- Edited by: A. Abramova
- Music by: Isaac Schwartz
- Production company: Mosfilm
- Release date: 1972
- Running time: 68 minutes
- Country: Soviet Union
- Language: Russian

The Stationmaster (Russian: Станционный смотритель, romanized: Stantsionny smotritel) is a 1972 drama film based on the 1831 short story of the same name by Alexander Pushkin.

The film's themes include the sanctity of parental love and disappointments. Young Duniasha against her father's wishes leaves home with a young rake. The old man's life is destroyed and the daughter who disobeyed her parents is unhappy.

== Cast ==
- Nikolai Pastukhov as Samson Vyrin, the stationmaster
- Marianna Kushnerova as Dunya, daughter of Samson Vyrin
- Nikita Mikhalkov as Minsky, hussar
- Valentina Ananina as brewer's wife
- Anatoly Borisov as doctor
