= Nikolai Pastukhov =

Soviet-Russian actor (1923–2014)

Nikolai Pastukhov PAR
- Born: Nikolai Isaakovich Pastukhov; 13 May 1923; Surazh, Bryansk Oblast, Russian SFSR, Soviet Union
- Died: 23 May 2014 (aged 91); Moscow, Russia
- Occupations: actor theatre teacher
- Years active: 1965 — 2014

Nikolai Isaakovich Pastukhov (Russian: Николай Исаакович Пастухов; 13 May 1923 – 23 May 2014) was a Soviet and Russian actor.

== Biography ==
Born on 13 May 1923 in the village Peski (now — Bryansk Oblast). At the age of 16 enrolled in drama school Bauman Palace of Pioneers to the teacher Sergey Vladimirovich Sierpinski. In 1941 he entered the Theater School Shchepkin. Since 1945, he worked in TSTKA in Tambov Drama Theatre, the theater Contemporary, since 1958 — in DATS (now — TSATRA).

In the Central House of the Red Army first came before the Great Patriotic War. Drafted into the Red Army on 7 October 1942, RVC Bauman Moscow. On the fronts with 25 September 1943. Was slightly injured. Musician musical platoon 308 LSKD Guard junior sergeant. In 1945 he returned to TSTKA. In 1953–1957 years — actor Tambov Drama Theater named Lunacharsky, in 1957-1958 — Theater Contemporary, in the years 1945-1953 and 1958 — Russian Army Theatre.

== Death ==
Died in Moscow on 23 May 2014. His funeral was held on 26 May. He was buried at Troyekurovskoye Cemetery.

== Selected filmography ==
- Uncle Vanya (1971) as Iliya Ilich Telyegin
- The Stationmaster (1972) as Samson Vyrin
- Investigation Held by ZnaToKi (1973) as Gusev
- At Home Among Strangers (1974) as Stepan Lipyagin, Chekist
- From Dawn Till Sunset (1975) as Fyodor Vasilevich Roznov
- A Slave of Love (1976) as Veniamin Konstantinovich, writer
- An Unfinished Piece for Mechanical Piano (1977) as Porfiry Semyonovich Glagolyev
- The Feast Day (1978) as Grinin
- On the Eve of the Premiere (1978) as Ivan Maksimovich
- Wedding Day Will Have to be Clarified (1979) as Pyotr Andreyevich Shitov
- A Few Days from the Life of I.I. Oblomov (1980) as Stoltz's father
- Three Years (1980) as Dr. Belavin
- Such a Strange Evening in a Narrow Family Circle (1985) as Edda Pavelko
- Viktoria (1987) as Oscar Borisovich
- Khristiane (1987) as priest
- Presumption of innocence (1988) as Pyotr Nikitich
- Lady Macbeth of the Mtsensk District (1989) as Zinovy Borisovich
- Crash – Cop's Daughter (1989) as Valeria's grandfather
- Po 206 (1990) as Aleksey Semyonovich
- The Russia House (1990) as uncle Matvey
- Lost in Siberia (1991) as uncle Misha
- Pustynya (1991) as John the Baptist
- Police Academy: Mission to Moscow (1994) as head of the family
- Mute Witness (1995) as janitor
- Un tramway à Moscou (1996) as Boris Ivanovich
- Prazdnik (2001) as Semyon Ivanovich
- You Will Not Leave Me (2006) as old man (final film role)
