= Svetlana Ivanova =

Russian actress

Svetlana Ivanov
- Светлана Иванова
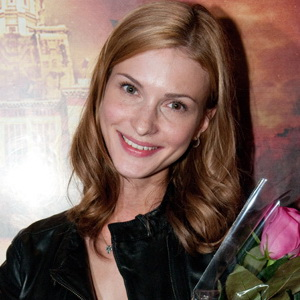
- Ivanova at the premiere of Dark World, 2010
- Born: Svetlana Andreyevna Ivanova; 26 September 1985 (age 40); Moscow, RSFSR, USSR
- Occupation: Actress
- Years active: 2003–present
- Children: 2
- Awards: Golden Eagle Award (2017)

Svetlana Andreyevna Ivanova (Russian: Светлана Андреевна Иванова; born 26 September 1985) is a Russian theater and film actress. Her feature film debut was in The 9th Company (2005). Subsequently, she starred in such films as Franz + Polina (2006), August Eighth (2011), Friends of Friends (2014), and others. Ivanova received a number of accolades for the role of Polina in Franz + Polina.

== Early life ==
Ivanova was born in Moscow, Russian SFSR, Soviet Union, into a family of power engineers.

== Education ==
In 2006, Ivanova graduated from the Gerasimov Institute of Cinematography, where she studied in Igor Yasulovich's class.

== Career ==
Ivanova made her major debut as Olya in the 2005 film The 9th Company by Fyodor Bondarchuk.

Then, she played the main female role in the film "Franz + Polina" directed by Mikhail Segal. Both the film and Ivanova as Polina received numerous awards at various film festivals. Ivanova was awarded the Special Jury Prize of the Third International Film Festival "Baltic Debuts", the "Golden Sword" Prize for Best Actress at the IV International Festival of Military Movies, the Best Actress awards at the 15th Open Film Festival of CIS and Baltic countries Kinoshock, and at the XIV International Festival of Film Actors "Constellation" (Sozvezdie) for the role in this film.

== Personal life ==
In 2006, Ivanova was romantically involved with cinematographer Vyacheslav Lisnevskiy, who later became her common-law husband. In 2012, she gave birth to their daughter, Polina. Since then, the couple parted. In 2011, she met the film director Dzhanik Fayziyev, her future partner. In February 2018, the news came that she was pregnant with her second child.

== Filmography ==
=== Films ===
List of film credits
Year	Title	Role	Notes
2005	The 9th Company	Olya	
2006	Franz + Polina	Polina	
2006	Playing the Victim	Stasya	
2006	Formula zero	Marina	
2006	Four taxi drivers and a dog 2	Katya	
2006	Real Santa Claus	Katya Nikitina	
2007	Father	Masha	(ru)
2007	Temptation	Anya	(ru)
2008	Cheesecake	a waitress in a cafe	
2008	Hello, Kinder!	Valeriya Rogacheva	
2009	The House of the Sun	Sasha	
2009	Moscow, I love you!	Sveta	
2009	Domestic cat	Nastya	(ru)
2010	Dark World	Marina	
2010	Contact times	Nastya	(ru)
2010	Above the city	Irina	
2011	Fairytale.Is	older sister, the daughter of Barbie and Kena	(ru)
2011	August Eighth	Kseniya	
2012	About him	singer	
2012	The Admirer	Lidiya Avilova	(ru)
2012	Happy New Year, Mom!	Lena	(ru)
2012	Legend № 17	Irina	
2013	Women's Day	Lena Golubeva	
2013	One Particular Pioneer	Svetlana A., 6B homeroom teacher class	(ru)
2013	A Perfect Murder	Olga Lavrova	
2013	Insight	Ona	
2014	Friends of Friends	Kristina	(ru)
2014	On March 8, the man!	Violetta	(ru)
2014	A Walk to Remember	Asya	
2015	Happiness is...	Vera	
2016	The Heritage of Love	Duchess Vera Chernisheva / Vera Yezerskaya	
2016	Forever and ever	Mariya	
2016	Close eyes	Foki's mom	
2019	The Blackout	Olga, a war correspondent	
2020	Cosmoball	bearded man's wife	
2021	Row 19	Katia	
2022	Monastery	Olga Shumakova	

=== TV Series ===
List of television credits
Year	Title	Role	Notes
2003	Godson	Dina	
2004	Farewell echo	Natasha	
2004	Photography		
2005	Duel	Anya	
2005	Private detective	Masha	
2006	The Last Confession	Nadia Tyulenina	Mini-series (ru)
2007	And yet I love ...	Rita Lyagushova	(ru)
2008	Side effect	Liza	
2008	From love to Kohannya	Nastya	(ru)
2008	Mines in the fairway	Liza	
2008	One Night of Love (TV series)	Sasha Zabelina	
2009	Palm Sunday	Oksana Lepina	
2009	Nepridumannoe murder	Natasha	Mini-series
2009	Zhurov	Lisa, the daughter Zhurova	(ru)
2010	The capital sin	Yuliya, the younger sister	
2010	Dr. Tyrsa	Lika Kireyeva	(ru)
2010	Cool guys	Senya	
2011	Fugitive	Kristina	
2011	In the Wrong Skin	Irina	(ru)
2011	Gossamer Indian summer	Anna	
2012	Rook	Dasha Okhlopkova	(ru)
2013	Razvedchicy	Arina Prozorovskaya	
2013	Give me a little heat	Vera	
2013	If you love - forgive	Dasha	
2014	Pregnancy test	Natalia Bakhmeteva	
2014	Alchemist. Elixir Faust	Olga	
2015	Meteorite	Alena	
2015	How I became a Russian	Anya Bystrova	(ru)
2015	Investigator Tikhonov	Elena Lavrova	

=== Roles in theater ===
- "Vermouth" (K. Schlender, diploma)
- "Christmas in the house of Signor Kupello" (E. De Filippo, diploma)
- "When the war is over" (for military prose, diploma)
- "The Power of Darkness" (L. Tolstoy, diploma)

Theater "Sovremennik"

- "Three Comrades" (based on the novel by Erich Maria Remarque) - Patricia Holman
- "Ardent Heart" (A. Ostrovsky) - Paracha
- "Three Sisters" (Anton Chekhov) - Irina
