= Yuri Bogatyryov =

Soviet actor

- Born: 2 March 1947; Riga, Latvian SSR, USSR
- Died: 2 February 1989 (aged 41); Moscow, USSR
- Occupation: Actor
- Years active: 1974–1989

Yuri Georgiyevich Bogatyryov (Russian: Ю́рий Гео́ргиевич Богатырёв, IPA: [ˈjʉrʲɪj ɡʲɪˈorɡʲɪjɪvʲɪtɕ bəɡətɨˈrʲɵf]; 2 March 1947 – 2 February 1989) was a Soviet actor, best known for his roles in five films by Nikita Mikhalkov, including At Home Among Strangers (1974). Bogatyryov, one of the leading actors of Sovremennik (1971–1977) and then Moscow Art Theater (1977–1989), was designated People's Artist of Russia in 1988.

== Biography ==
Yuri Georgiyevich Bogatyryov was born in Riga, Latvia, to the Soviet Navy officer Georgy Andrianovich Bogatyryov. In 1953 the family moved to Moscow. Yuri was fond of painting and after the eighth grade he left the school to join the Mikhail Kalinin Art College There, after meeting a member of a youth puppet theatre/studio Globus, he became interested in theater. In 1966 Bogatyryov enrolled in the Boris Shchukin Theatre Institute and after the graduation joined the Moscow Sovremennik Theatre where he worked up until 1977, to move then to the Moscow Art Theater. Critic and writer Vitaly Wolf recalled: "I remember well him joining the troupe in 1971. He was popular: everybody saw the boy had talent. He was very nervous, very kind and extraordinarily open-hearted. His tutor Katin-Yartsev used to tell me how worried he was about Bogatyryov's openness and vulnerability."

In 1970 Bogatyryov debuted on the big screen in Nikita Mikhalkov's short film The Calm Day in the End of the War. The actor became famous four years later after starring in Mikhalkov's 'Soviet western' At Home Among Strangers, as Shilov, a Red Army soldier. Critically acclaimed were his performances in three more Mikhalkov's features, An Unfinished Piece for a Mechanical Piano (1976, based on Chekhov's stories), A Few Days from the Life of I. I. Oblomov (1979, the adaptation of Ivan Goncharov's classic), and Family Relations (Rodnya, 1981). Bogatyryov also starred in the TV series Two Captains (1976, based on Veniamin Kaverin's novel) and an epic Declaration of Love (Obyasnenye v lyubvi, 1978).

In his later years Bogatyryov experienced severe psychological problems, associated with his bisexuality (the homosexual side of which he apparently was trying to suppress), troubled personal life, financial problems, drugs and alcohol abuse. He died on 2 February 1989, after a dose of clonidine injected by a paramedics' team (called to deal with a heart attack he suffered) clashed with antidepressants he had taken earlier and a large dose of alcohol. Yuri Bogatyryov was buried at the Vagankovo Cemetery on 6 February.

== Critical reception ==
Yuri Bogaturyov's death at the age of 41 was deplored by critics as a tragic loss of one of the country's most gifted and unusual actors. "There was no one like him, before or after. It looks like he'd come and gone so quick just to leave us this unfathomable enigma of his phenomenon to marvel at," wrote the Encyclopedia of the Soviet Cinema (2001). According to critic I. Pavlova, Bogatyryov was impossible to classify. "A two-meter giant, he could easily play a bravest knight (or the chekist Yegor Shilov in At Home Among Strangers), then turn into an ecstatically maudlin idiot Manilov in Gogol's Dead Souls. One moment his body could be steel-and spring-like, and he'd sport unequalled strength and agility. The next it would turn all wadded and quilt-like, as if lacking spinal cord... Immensely gifted, he was a wealth of the artistic 'material' in its pure form: fantastically pliable, filling any shape or form, easily meeting any director-poised challenges, dramatic or intellectual."

=== Recognition ===
- Lenin Komsomol Prize (1978)
- Meritorious Artist of Russia (1981)
- People's Artist of Russia (1988).

== Filmography ==
- 1974: At Home Among Strangers — Yegor Shilov
- 1975: Tam, za gorizontom
- 1976: A Slave of Love — Vladimir Maksakov
- 1977: An Unfinished Piece for Mechanical Piano — Sergey Voinytsev
- 1977: The Nose (TV Movie) — Tzar Nicolas I
- 1978: Obyasneniye v lyubvi — Filippok
- 1980: A Few Days from the Life of I. I. Oblomov — Andrei Ivanovich Stoltz
- 1980: Poslednyaya okhota
- 1980: Moy papa - idealist
- 1981: Dve strochki melkim shriftom
- 1982: Family Relations (Родня) – Stanislav Pavlovich
- 1983: Quarantine (Карантин) — grandfather
- 1983: Nezhdanno-negadanno — Ilya Petrovich
- 1983: Unikum
- 1984: Dead Souls (TV Movie) — Manilov
- 1984: Another Man's Wife and a Husband under the Bed (TV Movie) — Bobynitsyn
- 1987: Dark Eyes — Marshall
- 1987: Kuvyrok cherez golovu
- 1988: Pervaya vstrecha - poslednyaya vstrecha — Major Gei
- 1988: Prezumptsiya nevinovnosti — Kozinets
- 1988: Polyot ptitsy — Vladislav Razlogov

== Recognition and awards ==
- Lenin Komsomol Prize (1978) - for the creation of images of contemporaries and high performing skills
- 1981 - Honored Artist of the Russian Federation - for services in the field of cinema
- 1988 - People's Artist of the Russian Federation - for great services in the field of cinema
