= Love by Request =

1982 film

- Film poster
- Влюблён по собственному желанию
- Directed by: Sergey Mikaelyan
- Written by: Sergei Mikaelyan; Aleksandr Vasinsky
- Produced by: Pyotr Orlov
- Starring: Oleg Yankovskiy; Yevgeniya Glushenko; Vsevolod Shilovsky
- Cinematography: Sergei Astakhov
- Edited by: Izolda Golovko
- Music by: Igor Tsvetkov
- Release date: 1 November 1982
- Running time: 89 minutes
- Country: Soviet Union
- Language: Russian

Love by Request (Russian: Влюблён по собственному желанию, romanized: Vlyublyon po sobstvennomu zhelaniyu, English: Enamored by own Accord) is a 1982 Soviet romantic comedy-drama film directed by Sergey Mikaelyan. It was entered into the 33rd Berlin International Film Festival, where Yevgeniya Glushenko won the Silver Bear for Best Actress.

== Plot ==
A handsome but poor former sportsman Igor Bragin and a plain but brainy librarian Vera Silkova make an unusual agreement: to fall in love with each other through will alone. In the background is late Soviet reality with a few of its unattractive features – ambition ridden careerists, black market, drunkenness, growing skepticism and disillusionment with ideals. The scene when the protagonist, a sportsman, applies a wrestling hold to a middle-aged person in the presence of the latter's little son was disliked by some spectators.

== Cast ==
- Oleg Yankovskiy as Igor
- Yevgeniya Glushenko as Vera
- Vsevolod Shilovsky as Nikolai
- Irina Reznikova as Natasha
- Yuriy Dubrovin as Petrushin
- Vladimir Belousov as Gena
- Yuri Kopych as Mikhail Petrovich
- Kira Kreylis-Petrova as Vera's mother
- Ivan Ufimtsev as painter (voiced by Georgi Vitsin)
- Svetlana Shershneva as Vera's friend, an employee of the library
- Natalya Yegorova as resting
- Sergei Losev as planner
- Nikolai Drozdov (cameo)
