= Glorious Path =

- Russian: Путь славы
- Directed by: Boris Buneev; Anatoli Rybakov; Mikhail Shvejtser
- Written by: Ekaterina Vinogradskaya
- Starring: Aleksandr Antonov; Aleksey Bakhar; Sergey Bondarchuk; Inna Fyodorova; Georgi Gumilevsky
- Cinematography: Nikolai Bolshakov
- Edited by: A. Soboleva
- Music by: Vladimir Yurovskiy
- Release date: 1949
- Country: Soviet Union

Glorious Path (Russian: Путь славы) is a 1949 Soviet film directed by Boris Buneev, Anatoli Rybakov and Mikhail Shvejtser.

== Plot ==
The film tells about a village girl Sasha Voronkova, moving to the city in the hope of realizing her dream: to become a train driver.

== Cast ==
- Aleksandr Antonov as Ivan Konstantinovich
- Aleksey Bakhar
- Sergey Bondarchuk as Sekretar gorkoma
- Inna Fyodorova
- Georgi Gumilevsky as Ded i hochnoy storozh
- Olesya Ivanova as Sasha Voronkova
- Viktor Khokhryakov as Ponomaryov
- G. Koryagin
- Muza Krepkogorskaya as Katya
- Leonid Kulakov as Samson Ivanovich
- Vasili Makarov as Kapitan
- Nadir Malishevsky as Kolya Makagon
- Grigory Mikhaylov
- Pyotr Savin as Normirovshchik
- Nina Savva
- Aleksandr Shirshov as Aleksey
- Zoya Tolbuzina
- Mikhail Troyanovskiy as Trofimych
- Vladimir Vladislavskiy as Kladovshchik
- Kira Zharkova
