= Birds of Paradise (2008 film) =

2008 film

- Film poster
- Directed by: Roman Balayan
- Written by: Rustam Ibragimbekov
- Produced by: Oleg Kokhan
- Starring: Oksana Akinshina
- Cinematography: Bogdan Verzhbitsky
- Music by: Vadim Khrapachiv
- Release date: June 2008 (Moscow)
- Running time: 94 minutes
- Country: Ukraine
- Language: Russian

Birds of Paradise (Ukrainian: «Райські птахи», romanized: Raiski ptakhy; Russian: «Райские птицы», romanized: Rayskiye ptitsy) is a 2008 Ukrainian drama film directed by Roman Balayan. It was entered into the 30th Moscow International Film Festival. In 2009, the film won the Nika Film Award for Best Film of the CIS and Baltic States.

== Plot ==
The film takes place in the USSR in the early 1980s. Mass persecutions seem to be in the past, but listening to foreign radio stations is still prohibited, and it is dangerous to express one's thoughts in the presence of outsiders. Every knock on the door still makes me shudder. Words of truth sound only in kitchens, behind curtained windows, and make their way in typewritten books - "self-published". They are passed quietly, slowly, only to verified friends, fearing persecution. The main characters have to oppose the inhuman state machine, put their lives on the path to true freedom. Nobody and nothing can stop a person.

== Cast ==
- Oksana Akinshina
- Andriy Kuzychiev
- Oleg Yankovskiy
- Yehor Pazenko
- Serhiy Romaniuk
- Serhiy Siplivy
- Alla Sergiyko as Grandmother
