= The Last Road =

- Russian: Последняя дорога
- Directed by: Leonid Menaker
- Written by: Yakov Gordin; Leonid Menaker
- Starring: Yuri Khomutyansky; Alexander Kalyagin; Irina Kupchenko; Innokenty Smoktunovsky
- Cinematography: Vladimir Kovzel
- Music by: Andrei Petrov
- Release date: 1986
- Running time: 101 minutes
- Country: Soviet Union
- Language: Russian

The Last Road (Russian: Последняя дорога) is a 1986 Soviet historical romance film directed by Leonid Menaker.

== Plot ==
The film tells about the last days of the great Russian poet Alexander Pushkin. The film tries to answer the questions: Who is to blame for the death of Pushkin and for what did he fight in a duel?

== Cast ==
- Yuri Khomutyansky as Alexander Pushkin
- Alexander Kalyagin as Vasily Zhukovsky
- Vadim Medvedev as Pyotr Vyazemsky
- Irina Kupchenko as Vera Vyazemskaya
- Yelena Karadzhova as Natalia Goncharova
- Innokenty Smoktunovsky as Baron Jacob van Heeckeren tot Enghuizen
- Gediminas Storpirstis as Georges-Charles de Heeckeren d'Anthès
- Andrey Myagkov as L. V. Dubbelt
- Anna Kamenkova as Alexandra Goncharova
- Sergey Sazontyev as Konstantin Danzas
- Vyacheslav Yezepov as Alexander Turgenev
- Albert Filozov as Sergey Uvarov
- Ivan Krasko as captain Rakeyev
- Sergey Zhigunov as cornet Chicherin
- Mikhail Gluzsky as podpolkovnik Shishkin
- Oļģerts Kroders as Karl Nesselrode
- Rimma Markova as Maria Nesselrode
- Petr Shelokhonov as Stefanovich
- Valery Doronin as Nicholas I of Russia
- Viktor Bychkov as Pavel, servant
- Yuri Stoyanov as d'Anthès' friend (uncredited)
