= Sunstroke (2014 film) =

2014 film by Nikita Mikhalkov

- Russian film poster
- Directed by: Nikita Mikhalkov
- Screenplay by: Nikita Mikhalkov; Vladimir Moiseyenko; Aleksandr Adabashyan
- Based on: Sunstroke and Cursed Days by Ivan Bunin
- Produced by: Leonid Vereshchagin; Nikita Mikhalkov; Aleksandr Utkin
- Starring: Martinsh Kalita; Viktoriya Solovyova; Anastasiya Imamova; Sergey Serov; Kseniya Popovich; Andrey Popovich
- Cinematography: Vladislav Opelyants
- Edited by: Svetolik Zajc
- Music by: Eduard Artemyev
- Production company: Studio Trite
- Distributed by: DreamTeam Media
- Release dates: 3 October 2014 (Serbia); 4 October 2014 (Russia)
- Running time: 180 minutes
- Country: Russia
- Language: Russian
- Budget: $24 million
- Box office: $1.7 million

Sunstroke (Russian: Солнечный удар, romanized: Solnechnyy udar) is a 2014 Russian historical romance film directed, produced and written by Nikita Mikhalkov, starring Martinsh Kalita and Viktoriya Solovyova. It is set after the collapse of the Russian Empire during the Red Terror in 1920, with flashbacks to 1907, and is loosely based on the story "Sunstroke" and the book Cursed Days by Nobel Prize-winning Russian writer Ivan Bunin. The film was selected as the Russian entry for the Best Foreign Language Film at the 88th Academy Awards, but it was not nominated.

== Plot ==
The story is set in a prisoner-of-war camp in November 1920, in the Crimea, after the evacuation of the White Army, with several thousand White officers left behind on the peninsula. The officers are unaware of their impending doom, waiting for their fate to be decided by the Red Army officials. One of them – an unnamed poruchik (lieutenant) – is haunted by the memories of a dramatic and brief love affair which occurred in 1907. He tries to understand how the Russian Empire fell apart and who is to blame. His musing comes to an end when all the White officers board an old barge, which the Reds sink in the Black Sea, and all officers perish.

== Cast ==
In order of appearance in main titles:

- Martinsh Kalita as a poruchik (voiceover by Yevgeny Mironov)
- Viktoriya Solovyova as a beautiful stranger
- Sergei Karpov as Egoriy (Georgiy Sergeevich as a child)
- Anastasiya Imamova as Tatyana
- Sergey Serov as a priest
- Kseniya Popovich as Olya
- Andrey Popovich as Petya
- Aleksandr Ustyugov as Vladimir Yumatov, an Imperial Navy officer
- Aleksandr Oblasov as a steward
- Aleksandr Borisov as a sailor
- Maksim Bityukov as Trigorin
- Vitali Kishchenko as a cavalry captain
- Denis Vasilev as a student
- Aleksandr Adabashyan as a photographer
- Eduard Artemyev as a photographer assistant
- Kristina Kirillova as Lizonka
- Miloš Biković as baron Nikolay Alexandrovich Gulbe-Levitsky (Koka), a podporuchik (i.e. Second Lieutenant) of the Life Guard Uhlan Regiment of Her Majesty
- Avangard Leontiev as fakir (prestidigitator)
- Kirill Boltaev as Yesaul (i.e. Cossack Captain)
- Aleksandr Michkov as Junker (i.e. Cadet)
- Aleksey Dyakin as Georgiy Sergeevich (Egoriy as an adult)
- Miriam Sekhon as Rosalia Zemlyachka
- Sergey Bachurskiy as Béla Kun
- Vladimir Yumatov as colonel

== Production ==
=== Music ===
The musical score for Sunstroke was composed by Eduard Artemyev, who has collaborated with Mikhalkov on numerous movies (At Home Among Strangers, An Unfinished Piece for a Player Piano, Burnt by the Sun, The Barber of Siberia, etc.).

A leading tune accompanying the lieutenant's romantic feelings – toward his bride and the beautiful stranger – is a popular mezzo-soprano aria from Camille Saint-Saëns's opera Samson and Delilah called "Mon cœur s'ouvre à ta voix" ("My heart opens itself to your voice"), sung by Delilah as she attempts to seduce Samson into revealing the secret of his strength.

Also included in the soundtrack is the version of Nikolai Devitte's Russian Gypsy song "Ne Dlya Menya" (Not for me), performed by Mikhalkov himself, backed by the Kuban Cossack Choir. This song had already been used by the director; in his 1979 film Five Evenings it was sung by Stanislav Lyubshin's character.

== Release ==
The world premiere took place on 3 October 2014 in Belgrade, Serbia. The Russian premiere of the film took place on 4 October 2014 in Simferopol, in Russian-occupied Crimea. The film was released in wide distribution on October 9, 2014. The television premiere took place on November 4, 2014, on the Russia-1 television channel. In 2015, the same channel premiered the 5-episode version of the film.

The film was a box office failure, earning $1.7 million against a budget of $24 million.

== See also ==
- List of submissions to the 88th Academy Awards for Best Foreign Language Film
- List of Russian submissions for the Academy Award for Best Foreign Language Film
