= Nerkin Horatagh =

Nerkin Horatagh / Ortakend Ներքին Հոռաթաղ / Ortakənd
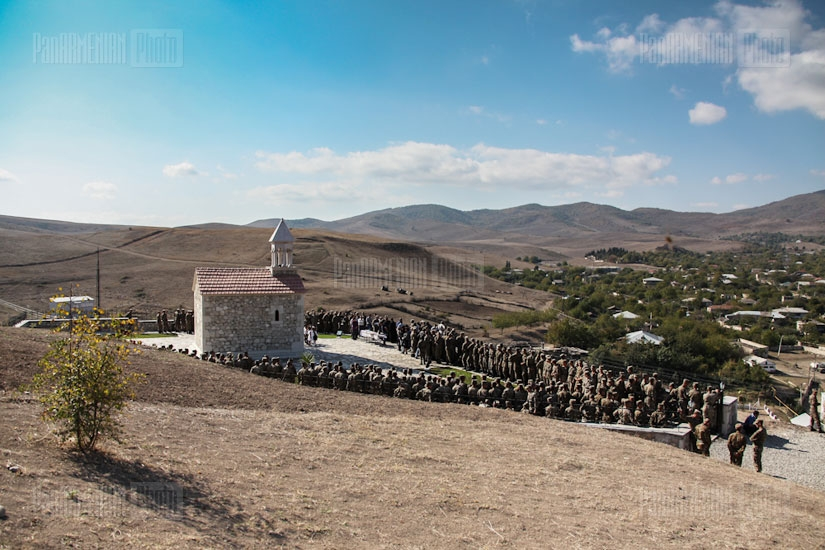
- St. George's Church in Nerkin Horatagh

- Location within Azerbaijan Location within Karabakh Economic Region
- Coordinates: 40°11′22″N 46°46′58″E
- Country: Azerbaijan
  - District: Aghdara

Population (2015)
  - Total: 840
- Time zone: UTC+4 (AZT)

Nerkin Horatagh (Armenian: Ներքին Հոռաթաղ; Azerbaijani: Aşağı Oratağ) or Ortakend (Azerbaijani: Ortakənd) is a village in the Aghdara District of Azerbaijan, in the region of Nagorno-Karabakh. Until 2023 it was controlled by the breakaway Republic of Artsakh. The village had an ethnic Armenian-majority population until the expulsion of the Armenian population of Nagorno-Karabakh by Azerbaijan following the 2023 Azerbaijani offensive in Nagorno-Karabakh. The village is located close to the town of Martakert.

== History ==
During the Soviet period, the village was a part of the Mardakert District of the Nagorno-Karabakh Autonomous Oblast.

== Historical heritage sites ==
Historical heritage sites in and around the village include a church built in 1094, a medieval cemetery, the church of Surb Astvatsatsin (Armenian: Սուրբ Աստվածածին, lit. 'Holy Mother of God') built in 1904-1914, and St. George's Church (Armenian: Սուրբ Գևորգ եկեղեցի, romanized: Surb Gevorg Yekeghetsi) built in 2012.

== Economy and culture ==
The population is mainly engaged in agriculture, animal husbandry, and mining. As of 2015, the village has a municipal building, a secondary school, 10 shops, and a medical centre.

== Demographics ==
The village had 776 inhabitants in 2005, and 840 inhabitants in 2015.

As of January 2026 the 31 Azerbaijani families, totaling 119 individuals, have been resettled in the Aşağı Oratağ village by Azerbaijan.

== Notable people ==
- Roman Balayan, Ukrainian-Armenian film director
