= PPK (duo) =

Russian electronic music band

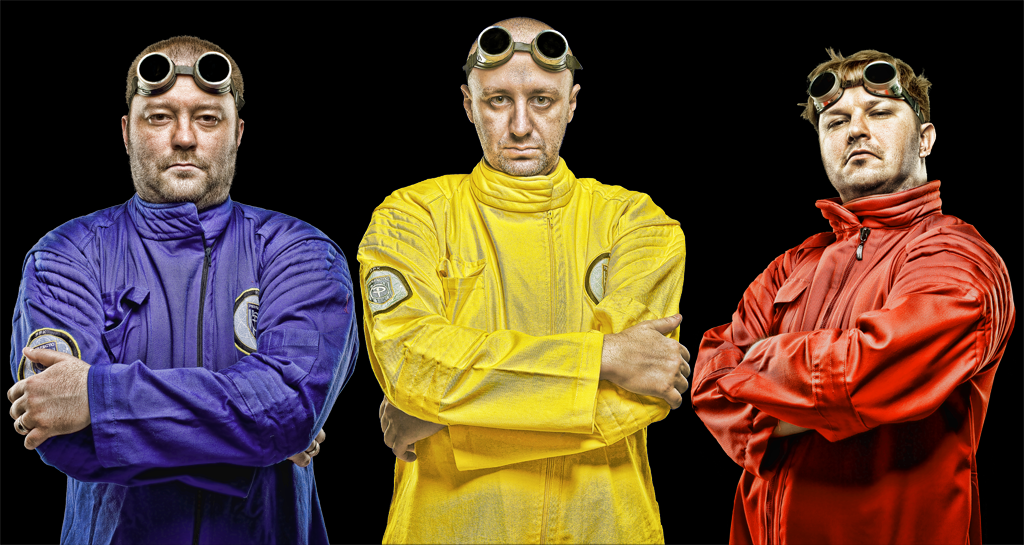
- PPK in 2011

Background information
- Origin: Rostov-on-Don, Russia
- Genres: Trance
- Years active: 1999–2003, 2010–2011, 2022-
- Labels: Perfecto Records, UPLIFTO, iRecords
- Past members: Roman Korzhov; Alexander Polyakov; Sergey Pimenov

PPK (Russian: ППК) is a Russian trance duo based primarily in Rostov-on-Don. The group consists of Sergey Pimenov and Alexander Polyakov. The name 'PPK' is the abbreviation of founding members' initials; K was for short-time member DJ Kordj (Roman Korzhov).

== Career ==
PPK became known internationally due to their single "ResuRection", which was available to download for free on mp3.com. The track had a few million downloads, which led to PPK signing a contract with Paul Oakenfold's Perfecto label. The track was used to celebrate the New Year 2003 in Warsaw, Poland (seen on Sky News Active, 31 December 2002).

The melody of "ResuRection" is based on the original melody «Поход» ("Crusade") written by Eduard Artemyev for the 1979 Soviet movie Siberiade.

The melody of "Reload" was based on "Zodiak" from the album Disco Alliance by Latvian electronic rock band Zodiaks.

The group finally broke up in 2011 after reuniting for a small concert tour in Russia in 2010.

On 23 February 2016, former member Roman Korzhov died from cancer.

On 5 May 2022, PPK announced the release of "Inspiration" on their official VK page.

== Discography ==
=== Studio albums ===
- Чувствуйте неспать! (1998)
- Неспать. Терпеть. Remixed (1999, limited edition cassette release)
- Русский Транс: Формирование / Russian Trance: Formation (2002)

=== Singles ===
List of singles, with selected chart positions
Title	Year	Peak chart positions				Certifications
Title	Year	AUS	BEL (FL)	NLD	UK	Certifications
"I Have a Dream"	2000	—	—	—	—	
"Hey DJ!"	2001	—	—	—	—	
"ResuRection"	2001	36	9	5	3	BPI: Silver
"Reload"	2002	—	—	—	39	
"Reload" / "Russian Trance"	2002	—	—	—	—	
"ResuRection" (Maurice West Remix)	2019	—	—	—	—	
"Inspiration"	2022	—	—	—	—	
"Immersion"	2024	—	—	—	—	
