= Yevgeniya Glushenko =

Russian actress (born 1952)

Yevgeniya Konstantinovna Glushenko (Russian: Евгения Константиновна Глушенко; born September 4, 1952, in Rostov-na-Donu) is a Russian actress, best known for her role as Vera in the Soviet melodrama Love by Request (1983). This role brought her international recognition with the Silver Bear for Best Actress at the 33rd Berlin International Film Festival in 1983.

Glushenko was raised in Rostov-on-Don and graduated from the Mikhail Shchepkin Higher Theatre School in Moscow in 1974. Since her graduation she has worked for the Moscow Maly Theater.

In Pavel Chukhrai’s psychological perestroika drama Zina-Zinulya (1986), Glushenko plays a young and complex woman, working as a dispatcher of cement trucks for a construction firm, turning her apathetic and insensitive colleagues into socially conscious people. She has had supporting roles in movies by Nikita Mikhalkov, including A Few Days in the Life of Oblomov (1979) and An Unfinished Piece for Mechanical Piano (1977).

Glushenko's most recent film release is Farewell in 2003. Her husband is popular Russian actor and theatrical director Alexander Kalyagin. Yevgeniya Glushenko became a People's Artist of Russia in 1995.
