= Dark World (2010 film) =

- Directed by: Anton Megerdichev
- Written by: Aleksej Sidorov; Aleksandr Dobrynyan
- Produced by: Aleksej Sidorov; Sergej Danielyan; Ruben Dishdishyan; Aram Movsesyan
- Starring: Svetlana Ivanova; Ivan Zhidkov
- Cinematography: Anton Antonov
- Music by: Alex HarDrum
- Distributed by: Central Partnership
- Release date: 7 October 2010
- Running time: 100 minutes
- Country: Russia
- Language: Russian
- Budget: RUB 120 million
- Box office: RUB 204 million

Dark World (Russian: Тёмный мир, translit. Temny Mir) is a 2010 Russian urban fantasy film directed by Anton Megerdichev. The film was the first Russian 3D format movie.

== Plot ==
A group of students on a field trip to Lapland uncovers an ancient shield. One of the students gets possessed by some sort of spirit essence and when a supposed rescue team arrives an epic battle over an entity trapped in the shield begins.

== Cast ==
- Svetlana Ivanova — Maria
- Ivan Zhidkov — Kostya
- Elena Panova — Helvi
- Sergej Ugryumov — Aleksandr Volkov
- Ilya Alekseyev — Arthur
- Maria Kozhevnikova — Vika
- Vladimir Nosik — Expedition Leader (professor)
- Kseniya Radchenko — Valya
- Aleksandra Valker
- Ira Antikajnen
- Denis Yushechkin
