= Tatyana Kravchenko =

Soviet and Russian actress

- Russian: Татьяна Эдуардовна Яковлева
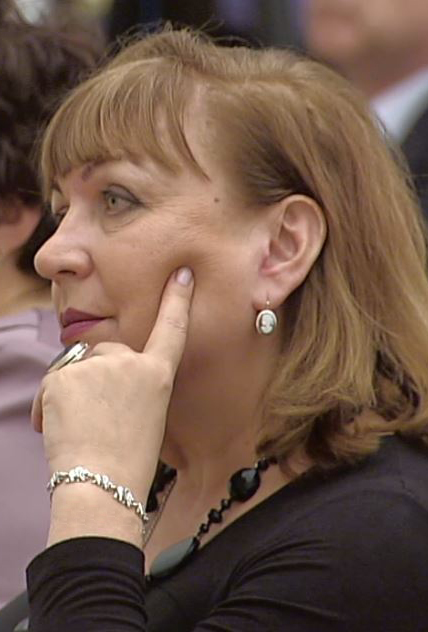
- Kravchenko in 2014
- Born: Tatyana Eduardovna Yakovleva; 9 December 1953 (age 72); Stalino, USSR
- Education: Moscow Art Theater School
- Spouse: Dmitry Gerbachevsky (divorced)
- Children: 1

Tatyana Eduardovna Kravchenko (Russian: Татья́на Эдуа́рдовна Кра́вченко; born 9 December 1953, Donetsk, Ukrainian SSR, USSR) is a Soviet and Russian film and stage actress, People's Artist of Russia (2002).

== Biography ==
She was born in the city of Stalino (later renamed Donetsk). In 1970 she graduated from high school №20 of Donetsk.

In 1976 she graduated from the Moscow Art Theatre School (course of Pavel Massalsky and Alla Tarasova).

Since 1976 - the actress of Theatre Lenkom. On admission to the theater Oleg Yankovsky advised the actress to perform under another, less common name. She took the name of her great-grandmother, and since then is known as Tatyana Kravchenko.

The popularity of the actress brought her work in many plays and movie roles.

She lives in Moscow, has a daughter, and is unmarried.

== Political views ==
In 2023, she publicly endorsed the Russian invasion of Ukraine, claiming that Ukraine "has turned into a fascist state".

== Awards and titles ==
- Order of Honour (14 January 2014) for her great contribution in the development of national culture and art, and many years of fruitful activity
- Honored Artist of the RSFSR (1991)
- People's Artist of Russia (2002)

== Selected filmography ==
- Golos (1983) as Nadya
- Vassa (1983) as housemaid
- Dangerous for Your Life! (1985) as Tamara
- Lady Macbeth of the Mtsensk District (1989) as Aksinya
- Sons of Bitches (1990) as Serafima Mikhailovna Korzukhina
- Promised Heaven (1991) as the matron of the nursing home
- White King, Red Queen (1993) as Irina Tischenko
- Life and Extraordinary Adventures of Private Ivan Chonkin (1994) as Aphrodite
- Shirli-Myrli (1995) as Bronislava Rosembaum, geologist
- Don't Play the Fool... (1997) as Zina
- Who If Not Us (1998) as Samokhin's girlfriend
- Balakirev the Buffoon (2002) as Anisya Balakireva
- Children of the Arbat (2004) as Sharok's mother
- My Fair Nanny (2006 / 2008) as Klara Karlovna
- Piter FM (2006) as Tatyana Petrovna
- Svaty (2008–2021) as Valentina Petrovna Budko
