= Nikolai Devitte =

Nikolai Petrovich Devitte
- Николай Петрович Девитте
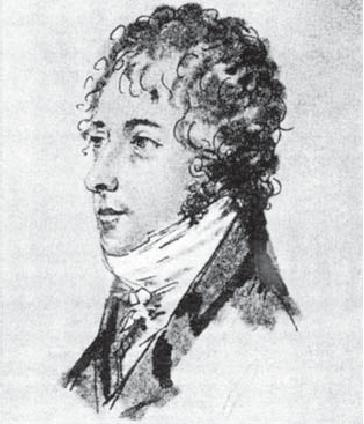
- Born: Николай Петрович Девитте; September 20, 1811; Moscow, Russian Empire
- Died: April 20, 1844 (aged 32); London, England
- Occupations: composer, harpist, songwriter, poet

Nikolai Petrovich Devitte (Russian: Николай Петрович Девитте, also: DeVitt, De Vitte; 20 September 1811, Moscow, Imperial Russia, — 20 April 1844, London, Great Britain) was a Russian harpist, composer, poet and songwriter, best remembered for his song "Ne dlya menya" (Not for Me), which has been performed by, among many others, Fyodor Chalyapin.

== Biography ==
Born to Pyotr Yakovlevich Devitte, a Russian military engineer of Dutch origins, and Vera Fursova who came from a noble Russian family, Nikolai Devitte, was a child prodigy. He started to learn music and fine arts at the age of six and instantly won the praise of his tutors, among them the pianist John Field, violinist Gavrila Rachinsky, composer Catterino Cavos, harpist Karl Schulz and painter Mikhail Terebenyov.

By age eleven, when he started to write poetry, Devitte had already been recognized as a virtuoso harpist and was regularly performing at high society salons (like the one hosted by Zinaida Volkonskaya, with whom he was later romantically involved), as well as the meetings of the cultural and political elite (Colloquy of Lovers of the Russian Word, Nobility Assemble). In 1826 Devitte, still only 15, started to publish his musical works, mostly songs, music for dances and pieces for harp. Mentored by Dmitry Golitsyn, he went on to work first for the Moscow Governor's office, then at the Foreign Ministry Archives, but still spent most of his time performing music and writing poetry. In 1843 he gave his first concerts abroad as a harpist. His early 1844 tour of Ireland and England was exceptionally well received. It was while in London that he suddenly died at the age of 32.

== Legacy ==
Nikolai Devitte authored at least 64 songs, 73 piano pieces and 3 suites for harp, as well as one opera and two ballets. The major part of his legacy, though, remains undiscovered yet; large part of it is apparently 'diluted' among the host of obscure Russian 'one hit wonders' whom Devitte had presented his own work by way of charity. Some researchers explain this bizarre habit by the influence of his close friend Osip Senkovsky, a master of literary mystifications, but Devitte was doing this, apparently, not for mirth. In his early teens, under the influence of Thomas à Kempis, in particular The Imitation of Christ, Devitte (whom some contemporaries seriously considered a 'messenger of God', bestowed with paranormal artistic gifts) decided that if he had any right to make use of his extraordinary talents, then only as tools for 'serving the mankind', and 'helping those in need', while remaining as anonymous as possible, according to Elena and Valery Ukolovs, his biographers. Soon after Devitte's death his name in Russia was forgotten. Some of his (credited) songs started to gain popularity in the 1920s and 1930s. The most famous one, "Ne dlya menya" (Not for Me, 1839), co-authored allegedly by A. Molchanov, became part of Fyodor Chalyapin's repertoire; the latter in his autobiographical notes mentioned this was Maxim Gorky's favourite Russian romance. Another fan is Nikita Mikhalkov who recorded his own version of the song, backed by the Kuban Cossack Choir, to be later included in his 2014 film Sunstroke soundtrack.

"Not for Me", published in 1839 by Biblioteka Dlya Chtenya, was almost certainly one of Devitte's 'charity' poems, for nothing (not even his full name) is known of the alleged lyricist A. Molchanov, except that he was indeed a real person, a Russian Navy officer. Pyotr Yershov's authorship of Konyok-Gorbunok (The Little Humpbacked Horse) has always been considered questionable, but unlike some of their colleagues who had pointed at Pushkin's possible involvement, (Note: Pushkin denied that he'd written what he (as well as many others) considered the work of genius; he did not believed in Yershov's authorship either, and was known to have kept the book in the 'By Anonymous' section of his library. Later, as Yershov applied for royalties from the re-issue, Osip Senkovsky famously scolded him for being so 'shameless' as to come and ask to be paid for the second time for what somebody else had written. Before departing for Ireland, Devitte provided the illustrations for this separate edition of Konyok-Gorbunok, without either asking or informing Yershov.) the Ukolovs claim they've proven beyond doubt that the true author of the famous fairytale was Nikolai Devitte. Despite the rise of interest in Devitte's legacy after the publication in 2001 of their book "Crucified on the Harp" (Распятый на арфе), he remains the most mysterious figure in the 19th century history of Russian music. "The real scope and boundaries of [Devitte's] artistic legacy are almost undefinable, but what is for certain is that they are grandiose," the Ukolovs opined.

== Video ==
- "Ne dlya menya" (Not for Me), performed by Maxim Egolayev and the Kuban Cossack Choir with instrumental accompaniment. Russian TV Kultura (YouTube)

== Literature ==
- Elena Ukolova, Valery Ukolov, Crucified on the Harp: the Life and Work of Nikolai Devitte // Е. Уколова, В. Уколов. Распятый на арфе. Судьба и творчество Николая Девитте. Монография. Стихи. Романсы. Фортепианные пьесы. М., 2001
