= Dead Souls (miniseries) =

1984 Soviet TV series

- Based on: Dead Souls by Nikolai Gogol
- Written by: Mikhail Schweitzer
- Directed by: Mikhail Schweitzer
- Starring: Aleksandr Kalyagin; Larisa Udovichenko; Tamara Nosova; Innokenty Smoktunovsky; Vyacheslav Nevinny; Inna Churikova
- Narrated by: Aleksandr Trofimov
- Music by: Alfred Schnittke
- Country of origin: Soviet Union
- Original language: Russian

Production
- Cinematography: Dilshat Fatkhulin
- Running time: 387 minutes
- Production company: Mosfilm

Original release
- Release: 19 November – 23 November 1984

Dead Souls (Russian: Мёртвые души, romanized: Myortvye dushi) is a 1984 Soviet television miniseries directed by Mikhail Schweitzer, based on Nikolai Gogol's epic poem of the same name. This story has been shared in many different interpretations. In 1930, author Mikhail Bulgakov was commissioned to write the first adaptation of this novel for the Soviet stage at the Moscow Art Theater. The 1984 miniseries was based on the 1960 film adaptation directed by Leonid Trauberg, which was inspired the Moscow Art Theater script. This story was also adapted as an opera in the 1980s as an American-Soviet production that first opened in Boston. The first cinematic interpretation of this work was directed by Pyotr Chardynin in 1909.

== Synopsis ==
This is a small-screen rendering of Gogol's epic poem critiquing the class system in 19th-century Russia by the same name. In this film, main character Chichikov travels through the countryside buying dead souls, or serfs who had deceased. By purchasing the deed to these "property," Chichikov is able to improve his social standing at a discount as these individuals were still accounted for in property registers postmortem and the rights to ownership for deceased serfs was less than that of the living. Dead Souls is a critique and satire of middle class life in Imperial Russia.

== Cast ==
- Aleksandr Trofimov – Nikolai Gogol
- Aleksandr Kalyagin – Chichikov
- Yuri Bogatyryov – Manilov
- Larisa Udovichenko – Manilov's wife
- Tamara Nosova – Korobochka
- Vitali Shapovalov – Nozdryov
- Aleksei Zaitsev – Selifan
- Viktor Sergachyov – Mizhuyev, Son-in-law
- Maria Vinogradova – Mavra
- Innokenty Smoktunovsky – Plushkin
- Vyacheslav Nevinny – Sobakevich
- Yuri Volyntsev – Alexei Ivanovich, Chief of Police
- Inna Churikova – Lady, nice in every respect
- Lidiya Fedoseyeva-Shukshina – Lady, just nice
- Irina Malysheva – Governor's daughter
- Yelizaveta Nikishchikhina – Sobakevich's wife
- Valeri Malyshev – Mikhei
- Aleksei Safonov – Public prosecutor
