= Franz + Polina =

- Film poster
- Directed by: Mikhail Segal
- Written by: Ales Adamovich
- Produced by: Oleg Urushev
- Starring: Adrian Topol; Svetlana Ivanova
- Cinematography: Maksim Trapo
- Edited by: Rinat Khalilullin
- Music by: Andjei Petras
- Release date: 10 November 2006 (U.S.)
- Running time: 119 minutes
- Country: Russia
- Languages: Belarusian; Russian; German

Franz + Polina is a 2006 Russian war romance film set in 1943 in occupied Belarus. It tells the story of Franz, a Waffen-SS soldier who deserts, and Polina, a Belarusian woman whose village is razed and people massacred.

The film received several accolades, including the 2007 FIPA D'Or Grand Prize.

== Plot ==
Franz stays at Pyatukhi, a Belarusian village and falls in love with Polina (Palina). The Nazis settled as friendly sympathizers in an effort to gain the confidence of the villagers while they await the order to burn the villages to the ground and kill the inhabitants. Franz kills his commanding NCO after he attempts to kill Polina's mother (Kucherikha/Kucharykha), and Franz's new found love Polina. When her partisan brother returns he whispers to Polina to get Franz away and she passes Franz off as her deaf-mute brother. Polina became pregnant after they briefly settled in a log cabin in the woods.

Always on the run, Polina is shot by a collaborator but saved by Franz as they join a band of refugees. Franz kills a German soldier for his uniform and infiltrates a nearby village to obtain an antibiotic to treat Polina's wound. When he returns he is already delirious with typhoid fever and accidentally reveals his national identity by slurring in German. The refugees are sympathetic with the exception of a small boy, the sole survivor of a family that was lured back to the village by the seemingly humane behavior of the Waffen-SS. He has a gun, bought with his father's watch, and his adoptive mother and sister are unable to dissuade him from using it on Franz. They warn Polina and soon the pair are on the run again.

Their escape is interrupted by a German patrol which in turn is ambushed by partisans. After this rescue Franz is at the river bank retrieving water for pregnant Polina when the boy appears with the gun. The movie closes with the boy returning with the water and comforting a screaming Polina.

== Cast ==
- Adrian Topol as Franz
- Svetlana Ivanova as Polina
- Tamara Mironova as Kucherikha
- Uwe Jellinek as Otto
- Valentin Makapura as Kazik
- Erika Bulataya as Kazik's sister
- Natalia Gorbatenko as Kazik's mother
- Andrey Merzlikin as Pavel

== DVD release ==
The notes on the DVD case compare the lovers to Romeo and Juliet. Their differing nationalities are stressed by printing the title in two alphabets, namely as Franz + Полина.
