= Guard Me, My Talisman =

- Directed by: Roman Balayan
- Written by: Rustam Ibragimbekov
- Starring: Oleg Yankovskiy; Alexander Abdulov; Tatyana Drubich; Aleksandr Zbruyev; Alexander Adabashyan
- Cinematography: Vilen Kalyuta
- Music by: Vadim Khrapachov
- Release date: 1986
- Country: Soviet Union
- Language: Russian

Guard Me, My Talisman (Russian: Храни меня, мой талисман, "Krani menja, moj talisman", also known as Protect Me, My Talisman) is a 1986 Soviet drama film directed by Roman Balayan.

The film was entered into the main competition at the 43rd edition of the Venice Film Festival. It also won the Golden Tulip at the 1987 International Istanbul Film Festival.

A journalist’s trip to a small town to cover a Pushkin festival spirals into a crisis of identity and jealousy when a provocative stranger pushes him to confront his deepest insecurities, culminating in a tense, psychological showdown.

== Plot ==
Journalist Alexei Dmitriev and his wife Tatyana visit Boldino to cover the annual celebrations honoring Alexander Pushkin. They stay with their friend Dmitry, the museum director, and Alexei interviews various guests, including artists and scholars, to capture the event’s atmosphere. During their stay, a young man named Anatoly Klimov begins following them and engages Alexei in discussions about Pushkin’s duel and character, suggesting Pushkin might have been in D'Anthes’ position if pushed. Alexei dismisses the idea, asserting Pushkin’s moral strength, and continues debating Klimov about the poet’s legacy and character. Despite Klimov's increasing presence, Alexei invites him to join a gathering of friends that evening, where Klimov’s intensity continues to unsettle him.

Afterward, Alexei leaves for the city, and upon his return, he finds Tatyana alone with Klimov, which sparks his jealousy. In a fit of anger, he challenges Klimov to a duel, but Klimov treats it humorously, agreeing nonetheless. The next day, Alexei returns home disheveled and tells Tatyana he has killed Klimov. Shocked, she and Dmitry urge him to confess to the authorities, but Dmitry soon discovers all the bullets intact, meaning no shot was fired. Dmitry tells Tatyana, who tearfully embraces Alexei, overwhelmed by her love for him. The episode leaves Alexei to grapple with his own vulnerabilities, stirred by Klimov’s provocations, leading him to confront deeper insecurities about his own values and identity.

== Cast ==
- Oleg Yankovskiy as Alexey Petrovich Dmitriev
- Alexander Abdulov as Anatoli Klimov
- Tatyana Drubich as Tanya
- Aleksandr Zbruyev as Dmitry, director of the museum
- Alexander Adabashyan as Monsieur Dardye, a French tourist

== Awards and nominations ==
=== Nominations ===
1986 - Venice Film Festival (Italy): main competition program for the Golden Lion

=== Awards ===
1986 - International Neorealist Film Festival in Avelino (Italy): Gold Prize

1987 - Istanbul International Film Festival (Turkey): "Golden Tulip" of the international competition
