= Mikhail Schweitzer =

Soviet and Russian film director and screenwriter

- Михаил Швейцер
- Born: Moisei Abramovich Schweitzer; 16 February 1920; Perm, RSFSR
- Died: 2 June 2000 (aged 80); Moscow, Russia
- Occupations: Film director, screenwriter
- Years active: 1949–1993

Mikhail (Moisei) Abramovich Schweitzer (Russian: Михаил (Моисей) Абрамович Швейцер; 16 February 1920 – 2 June 2000) was a Soviet and Russian film director and screenwriter. People's Artist of the USSR (1990).

== Biography ==
Mikhail Schweitzer graduated from the Gerasimov Institute of Cinematography in the directing class of the Sergei Eisenstein art workshop. He started to work at Mosfilm since 1943. Schweitzer was an assistant director of Man No 217 film production in 1944. Mikhail Romm was a director of that film. When Schweitzer lost his job after his first movie Glorious Path which was filming in the contestation with a cosmopolitism period, he could be accepted to work at Sverdlovsk Film Studio only with Mikhail Romm's help.

== Filmography ==
- Glorious Path (1949)
- Other People's Relatives (1955)
- Sasha Enters Life (1956)
- Resurrection (1960–1962)
- Time, Forward! (1965)
- The Golden Calf (1968)
- Funny People (1974)
- The Flight of Mr. McKinley (1976)
- Little Tragedies (1979)
- Dead Souls (1984)
- The Kreutzer Sonata (1987)

== Awards ==
- Honored Art Worker of the RSFSR (1965)
- People's Artist of the RSFSR (1977)
- USSR State Prize (1977)
- Vasilyev Brothers State Prize of the RSFSR (1989)
- People's Artist of the USSR (1990)
- Order of Honour (1995)
- Order "For Merit to the Fatherland", 3rd class (2000)
- Nika Award (2000)
