= Roman Balayan =

Ukrainian-Armenian film director

- Ռոման Բալայան; Роман Балаян
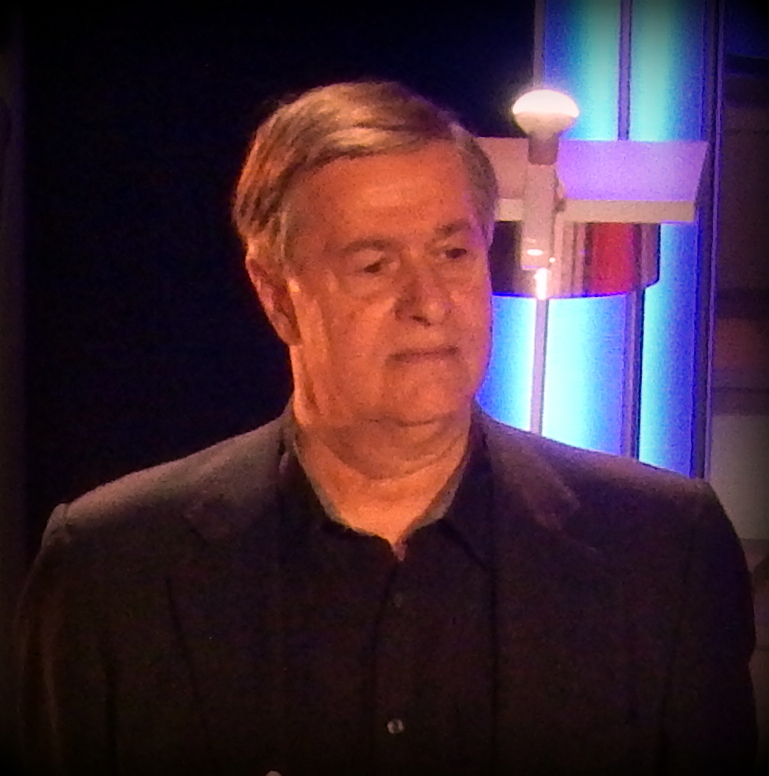
- Balayan in 2014
- Born: 15 April 1941 (age 85); Nerkin Horatagh, Nagorno-Karabakh Autonomous Oblast, Soviet Union
- Occupation: Film director

Roman Gurgenovich Balayan (Armenian: Ռոման Գուրգենի Բալայան, Russian: Роман Гургенович Балаян; born 15 April 1941) is a Ukrainian-Armenian film director.

In 1997, Balayan was awarded the title People's Artist of Ukraine. In 2024, Oleksandr Dovzhenko State Prize awarded for outstanding achievements of Roman Balayan.

== Career ==
Balayan worked as an actor in the theater of Stepanakert (located in the Nagorno-Karabakh region) in 1959–1961. He studied directing at the Yerevan State Institute of Theatre and Cinematography and film directing at the Kyiv National I. K. Karpenko-Kary Theatre, Cinema and Television University, graduating in 1969. Since 1970, he has worked at the Dovzhenko Film Studios in Kiev.

Balayan calls himself a student of Sergei Parajanov. He was nominated and won several international prizes.

He is well-known for his literary adaptations; authors whom Balayan has adapted for the screen are Anton Chekhov (Kashtanka, 1975; The Kiss, 1983, TV), Ivan Turgenev (The Lone Wolf, 1977; First Love, 1995), and Nikolai Leskov (Lady Macbeth of the Mtsensk District, 1989).

His film Flights in Dreams and Reality (1982), a drama about depression and a midlife crisis, is one of his most well-known works. Oleg Yankovsky portrays a creative man in his 40s who feels alienated in society. At the time of its release, politically minded viewers perceived it as a critique of Brezhnevian “stagnation”.

His 1986 film Guard Me, My Talisman was entered into the main competition at the 43rd edition of the Venice Film Festival and won the Golden Tulip at the 1987 International Istanbul Film Festival. His 1977 film Lone Wolf was entered into the 28th Berlin International Film Festival and his 2008 film Birds of Paradise was shown at the 30th Moscow International Film Festival. In 2018 he announced, that he may be shooting his next film in Ukrainian language.

== Filmography ==
- 1978 – Lone Wolf
- 1983 – Flights in Dreams and Reality
- 1983 – The Kiss (based on a story by Anton Chekhov)
- 1986 – Guard Me, My Talisman
- 1989 - Lady Macbeth of the Mtsensk District
- 2008 – Birds of Paradise
