= Anna Zharova =

Russian ballet dancer

Anna Alexandrovna Zharova (Russian: Анна Александровна Жарова) is a Russian ballet dancer, prima ballerina of the Novosibirsk Opera and Ballet Theatre, Merited Artist of the Russian Federation (2004), People's Artist of Russia (2013).

== Biography ==
Anna Zharova was born in Novosibirsk. In 1997, she graduated from the Novosibirsk State Choreographic School (class of Merited Artist of the Russian Federation Tatyana Kapustina). In the same year, the ballerina was accepted into the troupe of the Novosibirsk Opera and Ballet Theatre.

In 2013, the dancer opened her own Zhar-Ptitsa Ballet School in Novosibirsk.

In 2017, she was invited to dictate the Total Dictation at the Arnold Katz Concert Hall.

== Family ==
The ballerina has two daughters, Masha and Nastya. The husband of Anna also works in the theatre.

== Awards ==
- 2001 – Laureate of the IX International Competition of Ballet Dancers and Choreographers (Duets Nomination)
- 2002 – Winner of the Golden Mask Award (Special Jury Prize for the performance of the role of Swanilda in Coppélia by Léo Delibes)
- 2003 – Diploma of the Golden Mask Award for performance of the role of Kitri in Don Quixote by Ludwig Minkus (Ballet/Modern Dance/Female Role Nomination)
- 2004 – Meritied Artist of the Russian Federation
- 2009 – Diploma of the Golden Mask Award (Soloist, Who Cares? by George Gershwin; The Best Female Role in Ballet/Modern Dance)
- 2010 – Laureate of the Balerina Prize of the Igor Zelensky Ballet Support and Development Fund
- 2011 – Laureate of the Soul of Dance Award of the Balet Magazine (The Star Nomination)
- 2012 – Diploma of the Golden Mask Award for performance of the role of Carmen in the ballet by Roland Petit
- 2013 – People's Artist of the Russian Federation
