= Elena Solovey =

Soviet-Russian actress

- Born: 24 February 1947 (age 79); Neustrelitz, Soviet occupation zone
- Occupation: Actress
- Years active: 1966–present

Elena Yakovlevna Solovey (Russian: Елена Яковлевна Соловей; born 24 February 1947) is a Soviet-Russian film actress. She has appeared in more than 60 films since 1966. She won the award for Best Supporting Actress in the film Faktas at the 1981 Cannes Film Festival.

== Selected filmography ==
- Drama from Ancient Life (Драма из старинной жизни, 1971) as Lyuba
- A Slave of Love (Раба любви, 1975) as Olga Voznesenskaya
- An Unfinished Piece for Mechanical Piano (Неоконченная пьеса для механического пианино, 1977) as Sophia Yegorovna
- A Few Days from the Life of I.I. Oblomov (Несколько дней из жизни И. И. Обломова, 1980) as Olga
- The Suicide Club, or the Adventures of a Titled Person (Клуб самоубийц, или Приключения титулованной особы, 1981) as Lady Wendeler
- Could One Imagine? (Вам и не снилось..., 1981) as Tatyana Koltsova
- Faktas (Факт, 1981) as Tekle's sister
- Look for a Woman (Ищите женщину, 1983) as Clara Rochet
- Quarantine (Карантин, 1983) as Fyokla
- The Blonde Around the Corner (Блондинка за углом, 1984) as Regina
- Sofia Kovalevskaya (Софья Ковалевская, 1985) as Anne Jaclard
- Friend (Друг, 1987) as lady with a dog
- The Life of Klim Samgin (Жизнь Клима Самгина, 1988) as Vera Petrovna Samgina
- Anna Karamazoff (Анна Карамазофф, 1991) as Silent Film Star
- Khraniteli (Хранители, 1991) as Galadriel
- The Sopranos (3 episodes, 2002) as Branca Labinski
- We Own the Night (2007) as Kalina Buzhayeva
- The Immigrant (2013) as Rosie Hertz
- The Lost City of Z (2016) as Madame Kumel
