= Siberiade =

- Russian DVD cover
- Directed by: Andrei Konchalovsky
- Written by: Andrei Konchalovsky; Valentin Yezhov
- Produced by: Erik Waisberg
- Starring: Vladimir Samoilov; Natalya Andrejchenko; Vitaly Solomin; Nikita Mikhalkov
- Cinematography: Levan Paatashvili
- Edited by: Valentina Kulagina
- Music by: Eduard Artemyev
- Production company: Mosfilm
- Distributed by: Sovexportfilm
- Release dates: 10 May 1979 (Cannes); 10 January 1980
- Running time: 275 minutes
- Country: Soviet Union
- Languages: Russian; German

Siberiade (Russian: Сибириада, translit. Sibiriada) is a 1979 Soviet historical drama film directed by Andrei Konchalovsky and produced by Mosfilm. The four-part epic spans much of the 20th century.

== Themes ==
The film combines narrative elements from different traditions. Its first part tells of wondrous archetypical elements within the Russian culture, as connected to the pre-electrified epoch that is being narrated. Similarly, elements of the heroic epic are included within the part narrating the protagonist's involvement in World War II.

== Synopsis ==
The story revolves around two feuding families, the Solomins and the Ustyuzhanins, who live in Yelan. The Solomins are relatively wealthy and the Ustyuzhanins poor.

The film begins in 1904. Afanasy "Afonya" Ustyuzhanin is an aging man who spends all of his waking hours chopping a corduroy road "anywhere away from Yelan". His seven-year-old son Nikolai "Kolya" Ustyuzhanin must fend for himself by stealing from the Solomins. He meets Rodion Klimentov, a revolutionary fugitive who inspires him, but is soon found by the police and taken away.

In 1917, Kolya continues to help his father build the road, which has become an epic project stretching many miles. He is in a romantic relationship with a hoyden, Anastasia "Nastya" Solomina, but a quarrel about the revolution infuriates Nastya, who immediately seeks out Philip Solomin, kisses him, and demands marriage. (It is implied that Philip had previously had a non-reciprocated interest in her, and believes at first he is being mocked.) As the wedding preparations begin, Kolya begs for forgiveness, but Nastya savors the revenge. Kolya fights with the Solomins and is beaten and cast adrift down the river. At the end of the ceremony, Nastya makes a defiant gesture to Philip, apparently making clear that she will not be his either, despite having married him. He later finds her hiding in a barn; he fights and partially strips her, and then lets her go. She leaves to join an unconscious Kolya. Meanwhile Afonya (still chopping) has a problem with his heart, lies down on an ant nest, and dies alone.

In 1932, Kolya returns to Yelan as a charismatic party official with his loyal, revolutionary-minded son Aleksei. He informs the Solomins that Nastya, who had left with him, died heroically. In a town hall meeting he gets the village to agree on a plan for tapping the area's natural resources. A dispute leads to Kolya arresting Spiridon Solomin, who soon escapes and kills Kolya. Aleksei flees.

In June 1941, Aleksei, a teenager, returns to Yelan and meets Taya, at that point still a naïve girl; she becomes infatuated with him. A recruiting barge visits the town, announcing the beginning of the Great Patriotic War, and Aleksei enlists. The boat pulls away and Taya yells to Aleksei that she will wait for him all her life. In the war, Aleksei saves an injured officer (Philip, whom he does not know, or at least recognize) and becomes a decorated war hero. The war ends, and Taya continues to wait for Aleksei's return day after day, which never occurs.

Around 1964, Aleksei returns to Yelan with an oil drilling crew. His uncle, Spiridon, has returned from prison a bitter and frail man, and Aleksei feels only pity. He meets Taya and has a casual affair, but she is also courted by Aleksei's boss Tofik, causing a rift. Meanwhile, Philip, who is in Moscow, has risen high into the ranks of Soviet leadership, but wrestles with his conscience over the plan for a massive hydroelectric dam project that would flood Yelan. Aleksei resigns from the oil drilling operation to leave town, stopping at Taya's house to take her with him to the resort city of Sochi, but it becomes clear that they have grown apart; she refuses to say whether the child she expects is Aleksei's or Tofik's. Aleksei storms off, and the oil well blows out as he leaves town. The blowout turns into an inferno and Aleksei rushes in to save a former coworker, and dies in the process. Spiridon gloats over the demise of the last Ustyuzhanin, but Taya reveals to him that she bears Aleksei's child.

At a party conference in Moscow, a telegram arrives with the news of the oil strike, which vindicates Siberia as a mining center. The officials react with pleasure but give a moment of silence for the passing of Aleksei. Philip flies to Yelan to supervise the containment operation, but it becomes clear that the graveyard must be razed to save the town. As the film closes, the ghosts of the Solomins and Ustyuzhanins seemingly appear in the graveyard expressing gratitude and unity.

== Cast ==
- Vladimir Samoilov as Afanasy Ustyuzhanin
- Natalya Andrejchenko as Nastya Solomina
- Vitaly Solomin as Nikolai Ustyuzhanin
- Nikita Mikhalkov as Aleksei Ustyuzhanin
  - Yevgeny Leonov-Gladyshev as Aleksei in 1940s
- Lyudmila Gurchenko as Taya Solomina
  - Yelena Koreneva as Taya in 1940s
- Sergey Shakurov as Spiridon Solomin
- Natalya Andreychenko as Anastasia
- Igor Okhlupin as Philip Solomin
- Pavel Kadochnikov as prophetic old man

== Awards ==
The film won the Grand Prix at the 1979 Cannes Film Festival.

== In popular culture ==
Eduard Artemyev's theme from the movie, Crusade, was covered by the Russian trance act PPK and issued under the title "ResuRection" in August 2001. It reached #3 in the UK Singles Chart. Equilibrio Chimpunpan's cover, Eduard Artemyev: Siberiade Theme, and Peter Theremin's cover, Sibiriada, were released in 2018. In 2020, it was used again by European music producers VIZE and Alan Walker for their song Space Melody (Edward Artemyev), a dance record which featured German singer Leony on vocals. Two further covers were released in the same year; the single Sibiriada by CS-Jay (Christian Steen Jensen) and the album track Siberiade by Messer Chups.

The movie's theme was also used during the opening ceremony of the 2014 Winter Olympics in Sochi, when Lyubov, the little girl, climbs in the air.
