= Alexander Kalyagin =

Soviet-Russian actor and director (born 1942)

Aleksandr Kalyagin
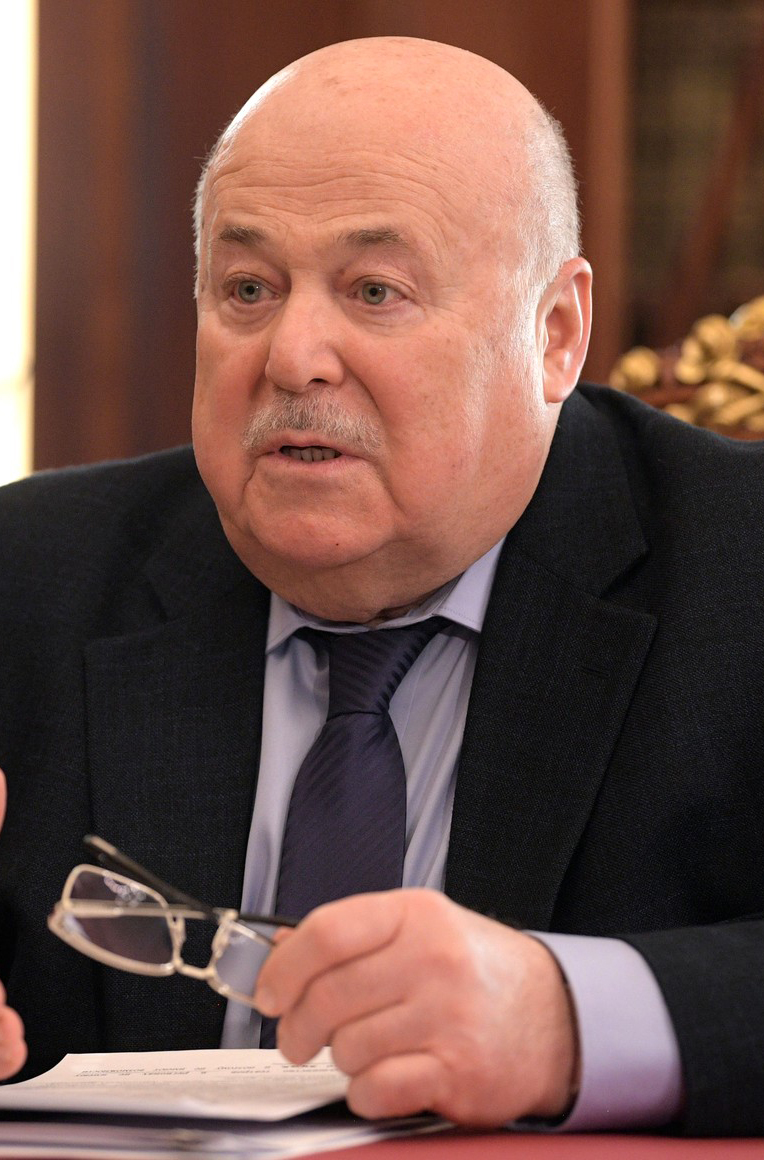
- Kalyagin in 2018
- Born: Aleksandr Aleksandrovich Kalyagin; 25 May 1942 (age 83); Malmyzh, Kirov Oblast, Soviet Union
- Occupation(s): Actor, director
- Years active: 1965–present

Aleksandr Aleksandrovich Kalyagin (Russian: Александр Александрович Калягин; born 25 May 1942) is a Soviet and Russian actor and director, member of the Civic Chamber of the Russian Federation, People's Artist of the RSFSR (1983), Laureate of the State Prizes for his works in the theater and the cinema. He is best known for his roles in the films Hello, I'm Your Aunt! (1975) and Dead Souls (1984).

== Biography ==
In 1965 Kalyagin graduated from the Boris Shchukin Theatre Institute and later worked in Moscow Art Theatre and some other Moscow theaters. In 1996 he was elected the Head of the Union of Theatrical Figures of Russia, and in 2003 he joined the United Russia party. Currently he is an art director of the Moscow Theater 'Et Cetera'.

An August 2023 blog page at url meduza.io on "How the State is Destroying the 'Golden Mask' " lists as concerns the level of influence of the Ministry of Culture and of Mr. Kalyagin.

== Filmography ==
Actor

- Long-Haired Wonder (1974)
- At Home Among Strangers (1974)
- Hello, I'm Your Aunt! (1975)
- A Slave of Love (1976)
- Wounded Game (1977)
- Interrogation (1979)
- The Old New Year (1980)
- Dead Souls (1984)
- A Rogue's Saga (1984)
- The Last Road (1986)
- The Kreutzer Sonata (1987)
- Me Ivan, You Abraham (1993)
- Children of Iron Gods (1993)

Voice actor

- Leopold the Cat (1975–1987)
- Tale of Tales (1979)
