= At Home Among Strangers =

1975 film

A Friend to Foes, a Foe to Friends
- A 1974 Soviet movie poster
- Directed by: Nikita Mikhalkov
- Written by: Eduard Volodarsky; Nikita Mikhalkov
- Starring: Yuri Bogatyryov; Anatoly Solonitsyn
- Cinematography: Pavel Lebeshev
- Edited by: Lyudmila Yelyan
- Music by: Eduard Artemyev
- Production company: Mosfilm
- Distributed by: RUSCICO (DVD)
- Release date: November 11, 1975
- Running time: 93 minutes
- Country: Soviet Union
- Language: Russian

A Friend to Foes, a Foe to Friends (Russian: Свой среди чужих, чужой среди своих; Svoy sredi chuzhikh, chuzhoy sredi svoikh) is a 1974 Soviet Ostern film starring Yuri Bogatyryov and Anatoly Solonitsyn and directed by Nikita Mikhalkov. It is Mikhalkov's directorial debut. Produced mainly in colour, some scenes are black and white.

== English language titles ==
The film's English title has numerous variants, and this in part has hindered success in English-speaking countries, along with particularly bad dubbing when it was first released in those countries. Variants range from a full length translation of the Russian title — At home among strangers, a stranger among his own or A friend among foes, a foe among friends to At home among the Strangers.

== Plot ==
The setting is post-Russian Civil War, during the reconstruction of the young Soviet republic. During the war, Shilov, Sarichev, Kungorov, Zabelin and Lipyagin had become great friends.

There are two main plots in the film, the first involving the theft of gold by outlaws just after the Russian civil war. Though the cannons are now silent, the enemy continues to harass the Soviets. The regional committee sends a precious shipment of gold by train to Moscow, and a group of demobilized Red Army soldiers — now Cheka officers — led by Shilov are entrusted with the responsibility of guarding it. The gold is needed to buy bread from overseas to feed the starving population. The Cheka guards are attacked and killed by a group of assassins, and the briefcase of gold is stolen. The group then hops onto another train, only to face a reversal of their own when their train is attacked by bandits. All the assassins are killed except their leader, who discovers that a bandit has secretly stolen the gold. He then joins the bandits in an effort to learn where the gold is, and to escape with it. In the meantime, Shilov is kidnapped and drugged before the train sets off, and is dumped in the street after the attack and framed as the inside man. He is suspected of treason, partly because his brother was a "White", which is where the second plot comes in. Shilov must infiltrate the enemy bandit camp to find the gold, hence the title. The second plot involves Shilov's desire to clear his name of murder, and he must find out who killed his friends. During his efforts, Shilov uncovers a web of deceit and treachery, which allowed the robbery to succeed. The story of a hero battling against corruption and greed echoes the cattle baron or railroad Westerns.

== Themes and influence ==
The film combines traits of a "buddy film" with "Eastern" look and setting. Nancy Condee writes that the choice of film location likens the Russian Civil War to U.S. frontier history: "the clean slate, a terra nullius at the imperial periphery, an unlimited moral expanse where socialism could be inscribed". The Chekists, shown at the beginning of the movie merely as former brothers in arms and friends, by the end of the film become a well-oiled organism supporting state sovereignty and governability. Likewise, the landowner's carriage, destroyed at the beginning of the film, gives way to a sleek and modern limousine as a symbol of the new state.

The Chekists are presented as the main instrument of the new state, its Mind, Honor and Conscience. The ordinary people, for whose sake the gold is confiscated, are never shown in contact with each other or the central characters. The only distinct folk figure is Kaium, a half-wit of unspecified Asian ethnicity. To Nancy Condee, Kaium plays the same part to Shilov as a friendly Indian to a U.S. marshal in a traditional Western movie. Shilov brings him "into the imperial fold as the state's first colonial subject".

The finale "brings home the spirit of the Revolution, which forges friendship that lasts forever". On the other hand, Lemke, a captured White officer, "has no friend, nobody to rely on; he is lonely, and this is almost enough punishment".

Ultimately, in the final scene, "the image of the old order represented by the carriage that featured in the black and white flashbacks becomes coloured: the past has caught up with the present, and the new order has won".

As Birgit Beumers notices, Mikhalkov does not attempt to portray an accurate version of events, but creates a myth of a heroic Revolution. Mikhalkov presents history "as it should have been". Not rooted in historical facts, the film blurs the historical perspective. Birgit Beumers mentions Svetlana Boym's distinction between two types of nostalgia, "one dwelling on longing for, the other on rebuilding, the past". Boym, addressing whether a past that has slipped out of reach can be reclaimed by means of nostalgia, warns against nostalgia that engages in "anti-modern mythmaking of history".

== Cast ==
- Yuri Bogatyryov — Egor Shilov
- Anatoly Solonitsyn — Sarychev
- Alexander Kaidanovsky — rittmeister Lemke
- Nikita Mikhalkov — Brylov
- Aleksandr Porokhovshchikov — Kungarov
- Sergey Shakurov — Zabelin
- Nikolai Pastukhov — Stepan Lipyagin
- Alexander Kalyagin — Vanyukin
- Konstantin Raikin — Tatar Kayum
- Aleksandr Adabashyan — Brylov's informant
- Elena Sanayeva — bride
