= Eduard Artemyev =

Russian composer (1937–2022)

- Эдуард Артемьев
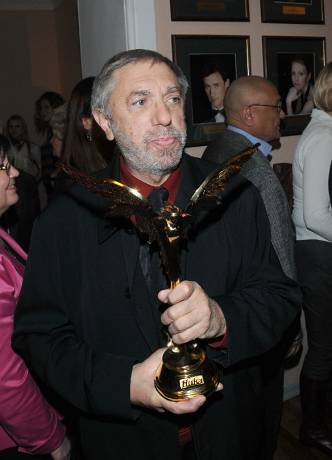
- Artemyev in 2008
- Born: Eduard Nikolayevich Artemyev; 30 November 1937; Novosibirsk, Russian SFSR, USSR
- Died: 29 December 2022 (aged 85); Moscow, Russia
- Education: Moscow Conservatory
- Occupation: Composer
- Title: People's Artist of Russia (1999)
- Awards: Order "For Merit to the Fatherland" (4th class); State Prize of the Russian Federation × 4; Vasilyev Brothers State Prize of the RSFSR

Eduard Nikolayevich Artemyev (/ɑːrˈtɛmiɛv/; Russian: Эдуа́рд Никола́евич Арте́мьев, IPA: [ɨdʊˈart ɐrˈtʲemʲjɪf]; 30 November 1937 – 29 December 2022) was a Soviet and Russian composer of electronic music and film scores. Outside of Russia, he is mostly known for his soundtracks for films such as At Home Among Strangers, Solaris, Siberiade, Mirror, Stalker, and Burnt by the Sun. He was awarded the title People's Artist of Russia in 1999.

== Biography ==
Artemyev was born in Novosibirsk and studied at the Moscow Conservatory under Yuri Shaporin. His interest in electronic music and synthesizers began after his graduation in 1960, when electronic music was still in its infancy. He wrote his first composition in 1967, on one of the first synthesizers, the ANS synthesizer, which was developed by Soviet engineer, Yevgeny Murzin. He was thus an early composer of electronic music and a pioneer of it. His collaboration with the film director Andrei Tarkovsky in the 1970s made him well-known. He wrote the film scores of Tarkovsky's Solaris, Mirror and Stalker. Later, he also wrote film scores for Andrei Konchalovsky and Nikita Mikhalkov. His film scores and his music received numerous accolades as well as three Nika Awards. He licensed several excerpts from the Solaris soundtrack in order to use them in the Spanish production The Cosmonaut. Eduard Artemyev wrote a couple of songs the most famous of them Deltaplan by Valery Leontiev.

In 2001, he won the Special Silver St. George at the 23rd Moscow International Film Festival.

Artemyev's composition Campaign or Death of the hero (Siberiade theme) was used at the 2014 Winter Olympics opening ceremony in Sochi, and his music theme from At Home Among Strangers was used at the closing ceremony.

In 2019, he visited Donetsk People's Republic to perform the first ever live performance of the music for The Barber of Siberia.

Artemyev died on 29 December 2022, at the age of 85.

== Film scores (selected) ==
- Solaris (Солярис, 1972)
- A Very English Murder (Чисто английское убийство, 1974)
- At Home Among Strangers (Свой среди чужих, чужой среди своих, 1974)
- Mirror (Зеркало, 1975)
- A Slave of Love (Раба любви, 1976)
- An Unfinished Piece for Mechanical Piano (Неоконченная пьеса для механического пианино, 1977)
- Territory (Территория, 1979)
- Stalker (Сталкер, 1979)
- Siberiade (Сибириада, 1979)
- A Girl and a Dolphin (Девочка и дельфин, 1979, cartoon)
- The Bodyguard (Телохранитель, 1979)
- Baba Yaga is against! (Баба Яга против!, 1979-1980, cartoon)
- A Few Days from the Life of I. I. Oblomov (Несколько дней из жизни И. И. Обломова, 1980)
- Anna: 6–18 (Анна: от 6 до 18, 1980—1993)
- Fox Hunting (Охота на лис, 1980)
- The Fairfax Millions (Миллионы Ферфакса, 1980)
- Family Relations (Родня, 1981)
- The Train Has Stopped (Остановился поезд, 1982)
- Without Witness (Без свидетелей, 1983)
- Moon Rainbow (Лунная радуга, 1983)
- Return from Orbit (Возвращение с орбиты, 1983)
- TASS Is Authorized to Declare... (ТАСС уполномочен заявить..., 1984)
- The Invisible Man (Человек-невидимка, 1984)
- One Second for a Feat (Секунда на подвиг, 1985)
- Courier (Курьер, 1986)
- Visit to Minotaur (Визит к Минотавру, 1987)
- Zerograd (Город Зеро, 1989)
- Close to Eden (Урга - территория любви, 1991)
- Genius (Гений, 1991)
- Burnt by the Sun (Утомлённые солнцем, 1994)
- The Odyssey (Одиссей, 1997)
- War is Over. Please Forget... (Война окончена. Забудьте..., 1997)
- The Barber of Siberia (Сибирский цирюльник, 1998)
- As Far as My Feet Will Carry Me (Побег из Гулага, 2001)
- House of Fools (Дом дураков, 2002)
- A Driver for Vera (Водитель для Веры, 2004)
- 12 (2007)
- Gloss (Глянец, 2007)
- The Nutcracker in 3D (Щелкунчик и Крысиный Король, 2009)
- Home (Дом, 2011)
- Branded (Москва 2017, 2011)
- Legend No. 17 (Легенда №17, 2013)
- The Postman's White Nights (Белые ночи почтальона Алексея Тряпицына, 2014)
- Sunstroke (Солнечный удар, 2014)
- The Heritage of Love (Герой, 2016)
- Nuremberg (Нюрнберг, 2023)

== Covers ==
- PPK - ResuRection (2001) | Cover of Theme to Siberiade
- Qilgad - Siberiade (2020) | Cover of Theme to Siberiade
- Luna Park - Space Melody (2001) | Cover of Theme to Siberiade
- DJ Feel - Not Alone (Three friends) (2021) | Cover of Theme to At Home Among Strangers
- Grazhdanskaya Oborona - Starfall (2002) | Cover of Theme to At Home Among Strangers
- Papulin & TonyLove - SLAVE OF LOVE/ADMIRERS (2016) | Cover of Theme to SLAVE OF LOVE/ADMIRERS
- On Thorns I Lay - "Black Cold Nights", from the album "Angeldust" (2001) | The chorus-verse is also a cover of the Theme to Siberiade
- Digital Mastermind - The Space Theme | Cover of Theme to Siberiade
- VIZE and Alan Walker featuring Leony - Space Melody (Edward Artemyev) | Cover of Theme to Siberiade with added lyrics

== Other recordings ==
- Warmth of Earth (1985)
- Three Odes (2002)
