= Pavel Lebeshev =

Soviet and Russian cinematographer

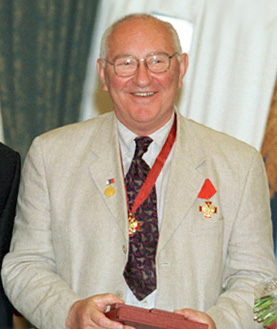
Lebeshev in 2000

Pavel Timofeevich Lebeshev (Russian: Павел Тимофеевич Лебешев; 15 February 1940 – 23 February 2003) was a Soviet and Russian cinematographer. Pavel Lebeshev graduated from the Gerasimov Institute of Cinematography in 1972 and worked with many famous Soviet and Russian directors, including Nikita Mikhalkov, Georgi Daneliya and Larisa Shepitko.

== Selected filmography ==
- Belorussian Station (1970); directed by Andrei Smirnov
- At Home Among Strangers (1974); directed by Nikita Mikhalkov
- A Slave of Love (1976); directed by Nikita Mikhalkov
- The Ascent (1976); directed by Larisa Shepitko
- An Unfinished Piece for a Player Piano (1976); directed by Nikita Mikhalkov
- Time for rest from Saturday to Monday (1984); directed by Igor Talankin
- Kin-dza-dza! (1986); directed by Georgi Daneliya
- Hard to Be a God (1989); directed by Peter Fleischmann
- Adam's Rib (1990); directed by Vyacheslav Krishtofovich
- Anna: 6 - 18 (1993); directed by Nikita Mikhalkov
- Nastya (1993); directed by Georgiy Daneliya
- Prisoner of the Mountains (1996); directed by Sergei Bodrov
- The Barber of Siberia (1998); directed by Nikita Mikhalkov
- As Far as My Feet Will Carry Me (2001); directed by Hardy Martins
