= Vladimir Medinsky =

Russian politician (born 1970)

- Владимир Мединский
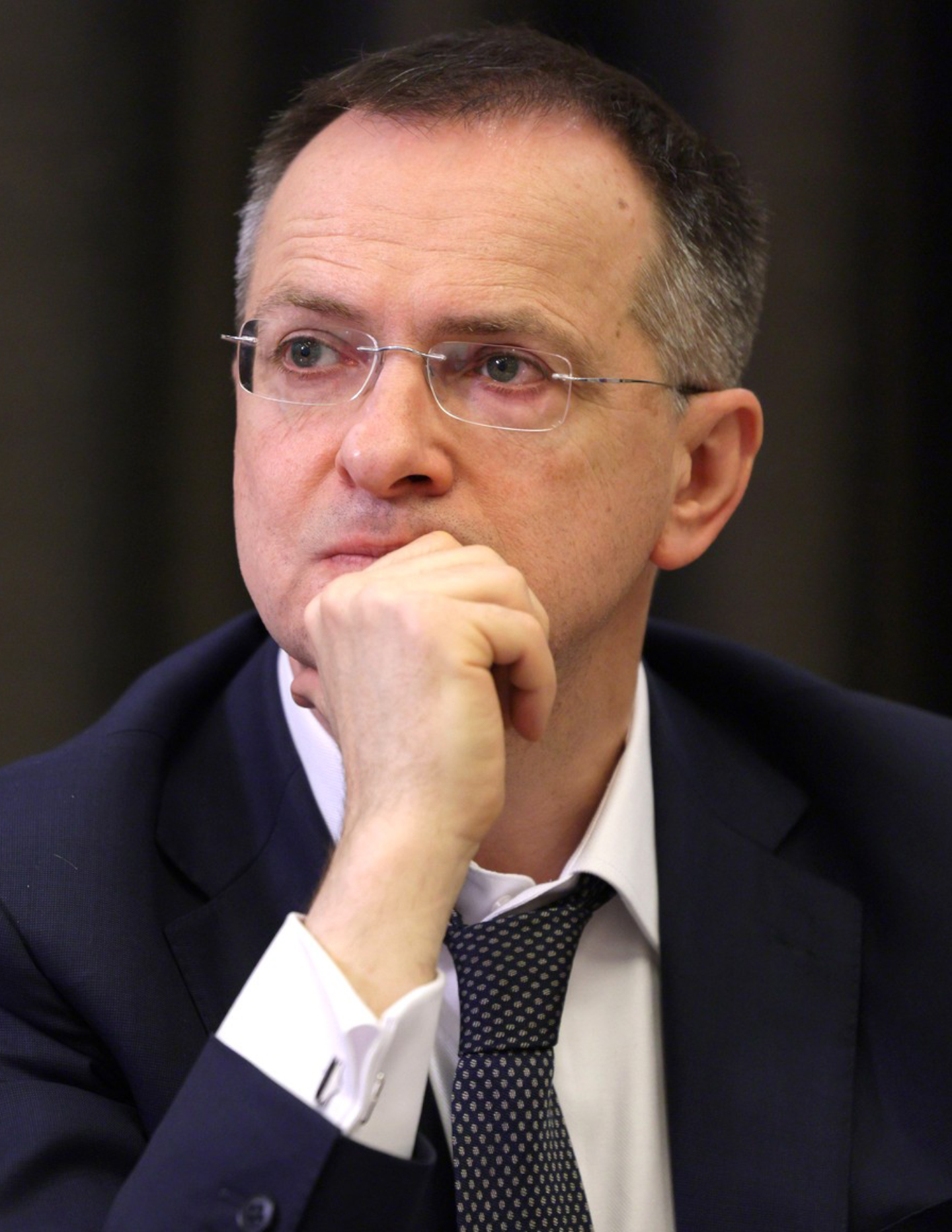
- Medinsky in 2025

Aide to the President of Russia
- Incumbent
- Assumed office 24 January 2020
- President: Vladimir Putin

Chairman of the Union of Writers of Russia
- Incumbent
- Assumed office 27 February 2025
- Preceded by: Nikolai Ivanov

Minister of Culture
- In office 21 May 2012 – 15 January 2020
- Prime Minister: Dmitry Medvedev
- Preceded by: Aleksandr Avdeyev
- Succeeded by: Olga Lyubimova

Member of the State Duma (Party List Seat)
- In office 7 December 2003 – 21 December 2011

Personal details
- Born: Vladimir Rostislavovich Medinsky; 18 July 1970 (age 56) Smila, Ukrainian SSR, Soviet Union (now Ukraine)
- Party: United Russia (2001–present)
- Other political affiliations: Communist Party of the Soviet Union (before 1991); Independent (1991–1995); Our Home – Russia (1995–2000); Unity (1999–2001)
- Spouse: Marina Medinskaya (née Nikitina)
- Children: 4
- Education: Moscow State Institute of International Relations (Doctor of Political Sciences)
- Profession: Politician, historian, publicist, writer
- Website: http://www.medinskiy.ru/

Vladimir Medinsky's voice
recorded December 2012

Vladimir Rostislavovich Medinsky (Russian: Владимир Ростиславович Мединский; born 18 July 1970) is a Russian politician, diplomat and historian who currently serves as an Aide to President Vladimir Putin. Previously, he has served as the Minister of Culture from May 2012 to January 2020. He was a member of the 4th and 5 State Duma from 2004 to 2011. He has been a member of the General Council of the United Russia party since 2017. Medinsky has the federal state civilian service rank of 1st class Active State Councillor of the Russian Federation.

Vladimir Medinsky's views have been characterized by some media as statist and ultraconservative. His political career began in 1992 after his graduation from Moscow State Institute of International Relations, where he earned a degree in international relations. Forbes has described Medinsky as a member of Vladimir Putin’s "ideological clan". After becoming a member of the State Duma in 2003, he soon emerged as a prominent figure in the Russian political establishment. During this period, Medinsky gained recognition as a notable political strategist, campaign manager, publicist, and popularizer of history.

Medinsky rose to prominence among readers through a series of non-fiction books on Russian history. In 2012, his debut historical novel, The Wall, was published, focusing on the events of the Time of Troubles. The novel was later adapted into a film, and theatrical productions based on it were staged at Moscow's Maly Theatre, as well as at theatres of Smolensk and Vladivostok.

In addition to his government positions, he serves as Chairman of the Russian Military-Historical Society (a nationwide public-state organization) and Chairman of the Union of Writers of Russia (a nationwide public organization).

== Biography ==
=== Early life and education ===
Medinsky was born in the town of Smila in the Cherkasy Oblast of the Ukrainian SSR. In the early 1980s, the Medinsky family moved to Moscow. He applied to the Moscow Higher Combined Arms Command School but was rejected due to failing the vision requirements. Subsequently, in 1987, he enrolled at the Moscow State Institute of International Relations under the USSR Ministry of Foreign Affairs.

While studying at MGIMO, he maintained his passion for military history. According to recollections of his classmates, Medinsky regularly attended open lectures at the MSU Faculty of History and was noted for his phenomenal memory of historical events. During his time at the institute, Medinsky served on the MGIMO Komsomol committee and worked as a counselor at the Ministry of Foreign Affairs' pioneer camp.

In the late 1980s and early 1990s, he completed an internship as a correspondent in the international desk of TASS news agency. During the August 1991 coup attempt, Medinsky was among the defenders of the White House. In 1991 and 1992, Medinsky completed internships at the Soviet (later Russian) Embassy in the United States. He graduated from MGIMO with honors in 1992.

He is fluent in English and Czech.

=== Early career ===
In 1998, Medinsky entered civil service as an advisor to the Director of the Federal Tax Police Service. In May 1999, he was appointed head of the Department at the Ministry of Taxes and Levies.

=== Legislative career ===
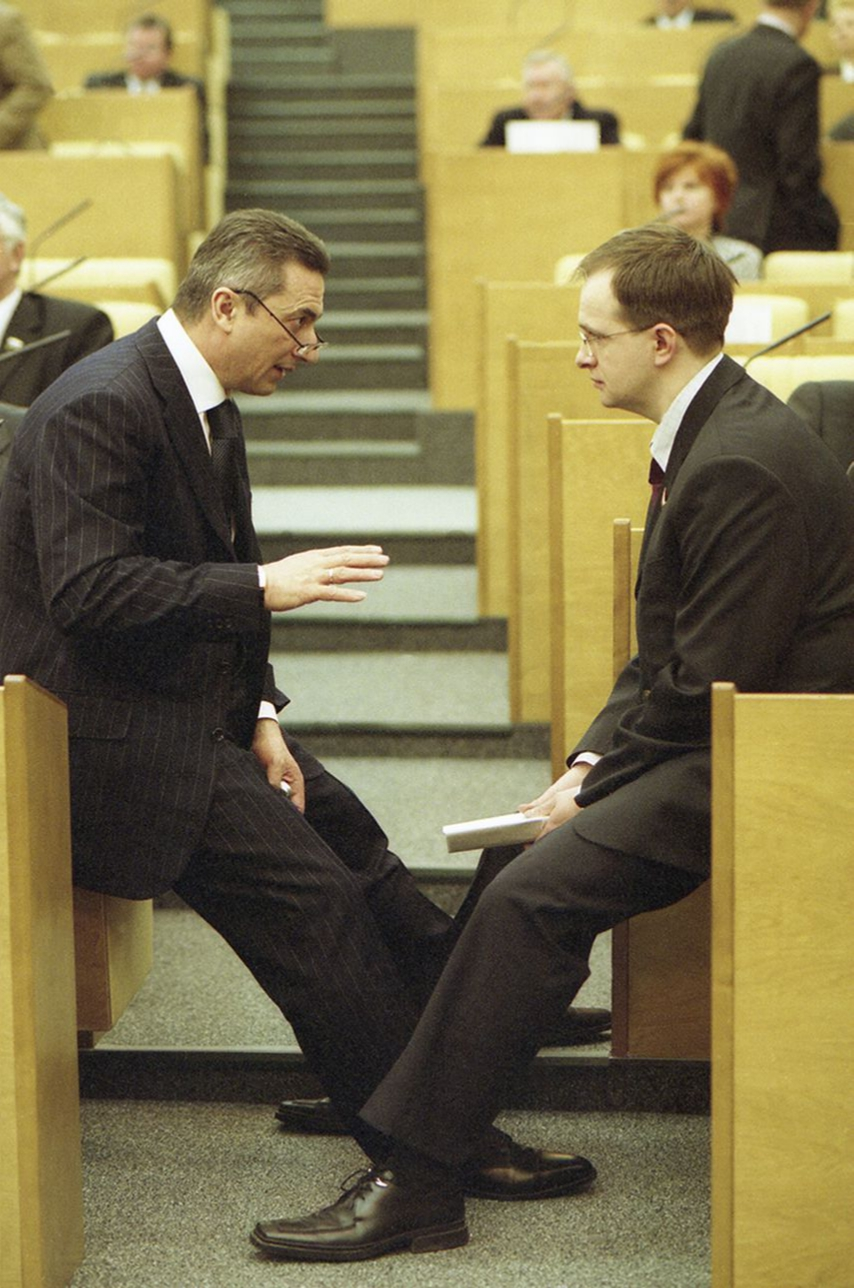
Medinsky at the State Duma, 2004

In 1999, Medinsky joined the election campaign staff of the Fatherland – All Russia bloc for the elections to the 3rd State Duma. From 2002 to 2004, he headed the Moscow executive committee of the United Russia political party and led the party's Moscow campaign headquarters during the 2003 elections. In December 2003, he was elected to the State Duma through the party's federal list. Between 2004 and 2005, he served as deputy head of United Russia's central executive committee.

During the 4th State Duma convocation, Medinsky held several key positions, including Deputy Chairman of the Committee on Information Policy, Deputy Chairman of the Committee on Economic Policy, and ultimately Chairman of the Committee on Culture.

In 2004, he authored a draft of the new Federal Law "On Advertising". Designed to replace the outdated 1995 legislation, this bill introduced significant new restrictions, including prohibitions on advertising alcoholic beverages, tobacco products, dietary supplements, and medical goods/services. It also established legal definitions for social and sponsorship advertising while implementing the first-ever limits on television advertising duration. The law was ultimately adopted and came into force on 1 July 2006.

Medinsky pioneered legislative efforts to severely restrict gambling operations (casinos) nationwide, proposing substantial tax increases on gaming tables and a complete ban on slot machines. This initiative sparked a public conflict with his fellow member of State Duma, Alexander Lebedev, who sent Medinsky an insulting written message. Medinsky responded with a defamation lawsuit, which the Basmanny District Court of Moscow decided in his favor, ordering Lebedev to publish a retraction and pay financial compensation. Ultimately, the gambling prohibition legislation was submitted to the State Duma by the Russian President personally and subsequently enacted.

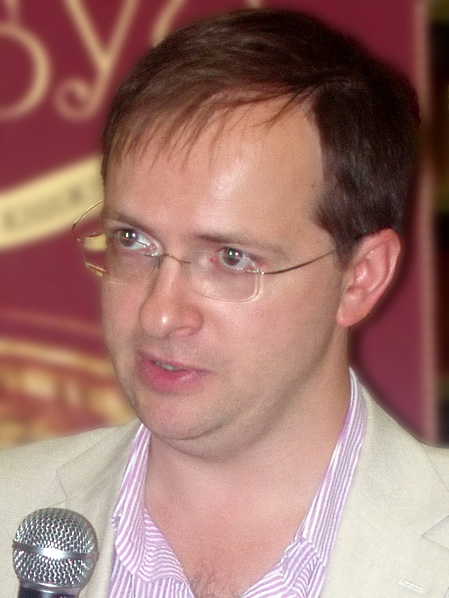
Medinsky in 2008

Elected to the 5th State Duma on United Russia's party list from Lipetsk Oblast, Medinsky received the mandate previously held by the Lipetsk Governor Oleg Korolyov. As a deputy, Medinsky's notable legislative initiatives included proposing stricter amendments to Russia's advertising law and tobacco restrictions. In April 2008, he advocated for a complete ban on cigarette advertising. Medinsky, together with Deputy Nikolai Gerasimenko, successfully introduced mandatory large-format health warnings on cigarette packages.

During the 2008 financial crisis, Medinsky co-sponsored with fellow United Russia member Vladimir Gruzdev amendments to the Russian Criminal Code aimed at easing pretrial restrictions for entrepreneurs.

His parliamentary activities included serving as coordinator of the Duma's liaison group with National Assembly of South Korea and membership in the Federal Assembly's permanent delegation to the Russia-European Union Parliamentary Cooperation Committee. In 2010, President Dmitry Medvedev appointed him to the Presidential Commission on Countering Historical Falsification. The following year, he joined the board of Russkiy Mir Foundation, which promotes Russian language and Russian culture worldwide. In 2011, Medinsky assumed chairmanship of the Duma's Culture Committee.

He became a campaign surrogate for Vladimir Putin during the latter's 2012 presidential campaign.

=== Ministerial career ===
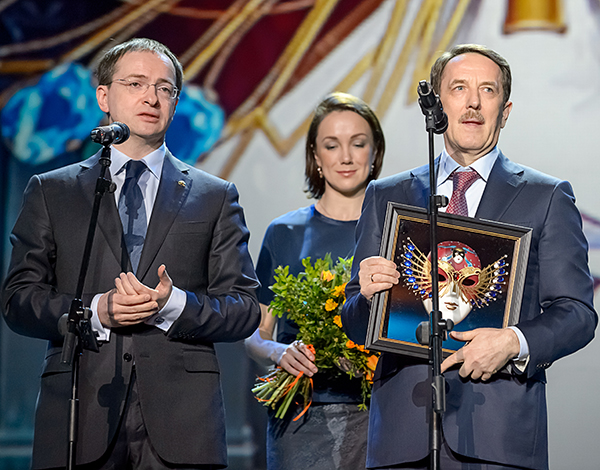
Golden Mask award in 2015

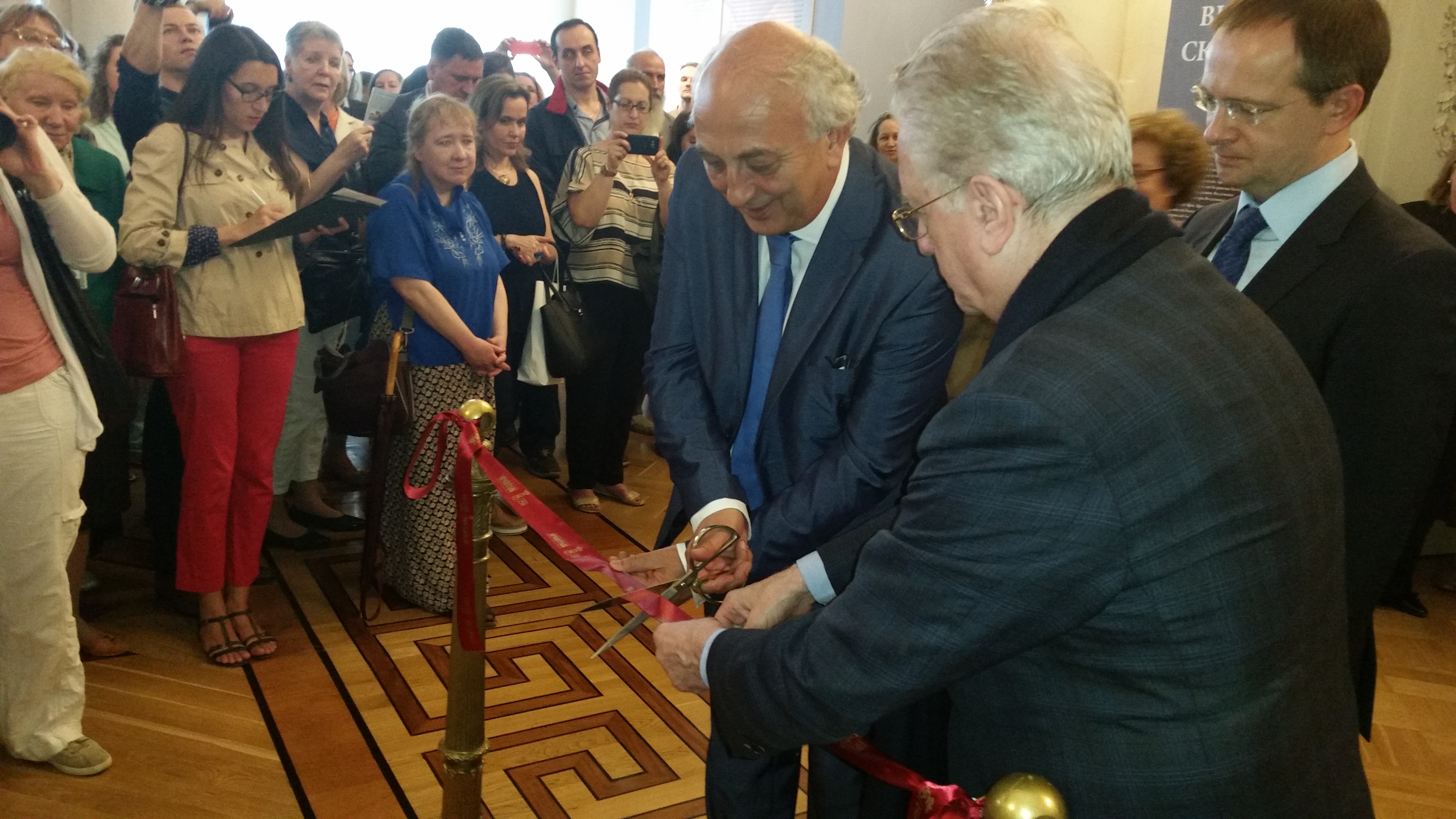
Medinsky and Greece's Deputy Foreign Minister Ioannis Amanatidis at the Hermitage Museum in St. Petersburg, 24 June 2016

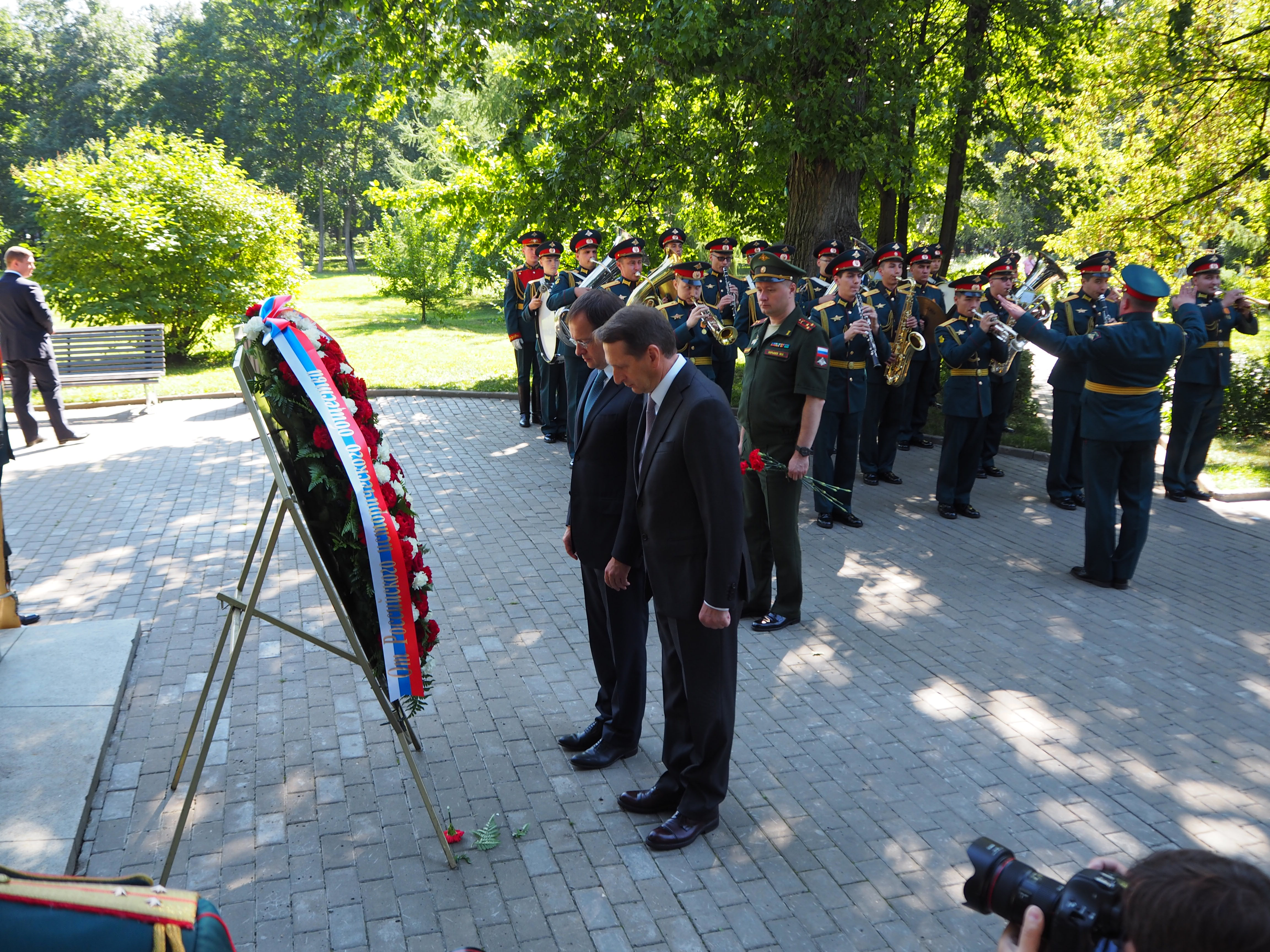
Medinsky and SVR Director Sergey Naryshkin at Memorial park of World War I victims in August 2018

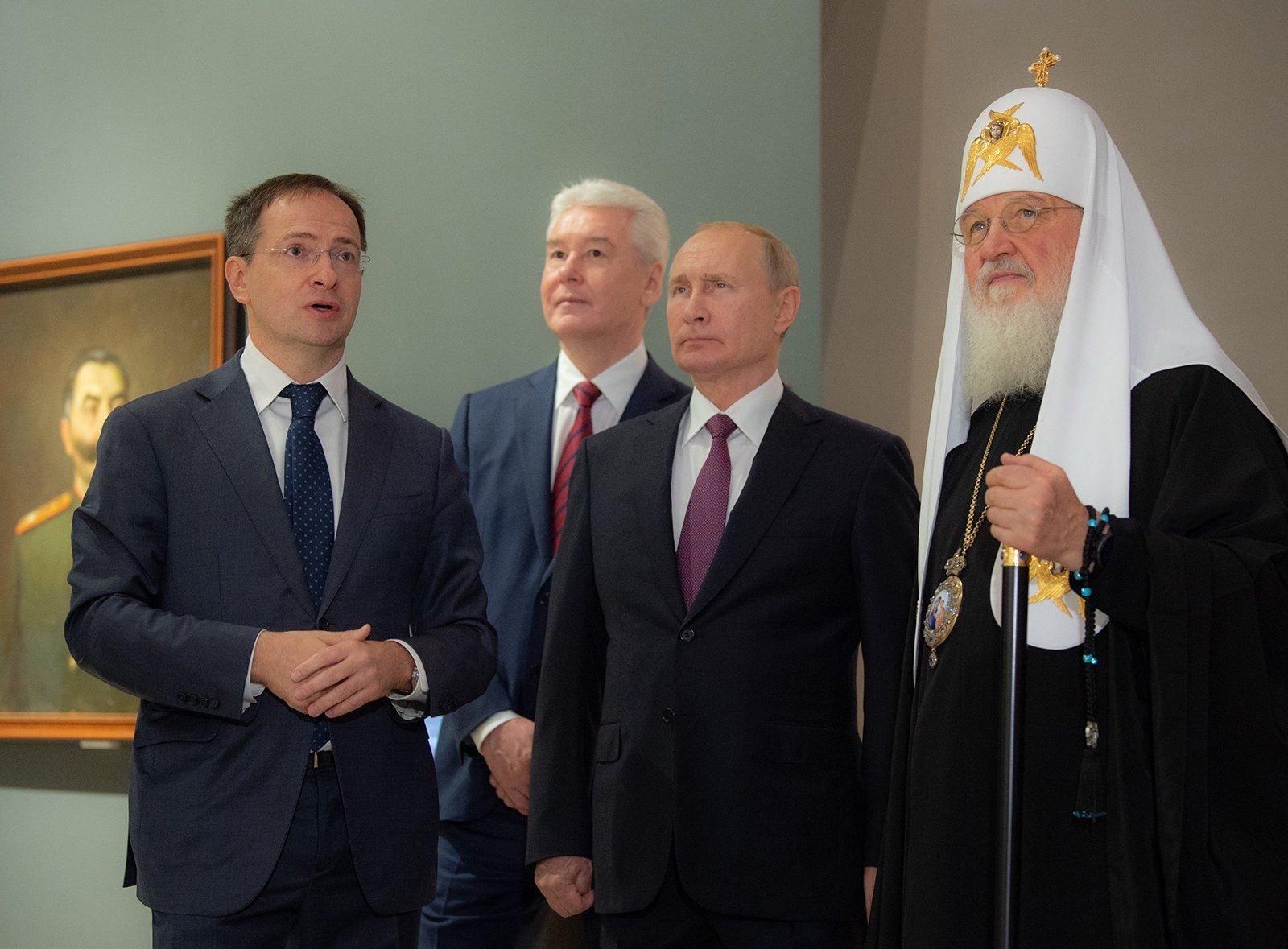
Medinsky with Putin, Patriarch Kirill of Moscow and Moscow Mayor Sergey Sobyanin at the Moscow Manege, November 2019

At the initiative of Prime Minister Dmitry Medvedev, supported by President Putin, Medinsky was appointed Minister of Culture on 21 May 2012. His appointment came as a surprise and provoked polarized reactions.

In a journalistic investigation published by RBK in July 2015, Ivan Golunov highlighted several notable initiatives by Medinsky as minister. These included a proposal to rename Moscow streets bearing the names of revolutionary terrorists like Stepan Khalturin, Andrei Zhelyabov and Pyotr Voykov, as well as Voykovskaya metro station (Medinsky suggested giving the streets the names of terrorism victims, including Grand Duke Sergei Alexandrovich and his wife Grand Duchess Elisabeth). Commenting on the presidential decree to create a unified concept for teaching Russian history, Medinsky proposed limiting the curriculum to the year 2000, excluding the presidential terms of Putin and Medvedev (which would avoid including controversial figures of modern national history and ambiguous interpretations in textbooks). Medinsky also promoted numerous protectionist measures in the film industry, which led to increased box office revenues and a greater share of Russian films in distribution.

Under Medinsky, the Ministry of Culture secured funding for films focusing on historical themes (Panfilov's 28 Men, Sobibor), inspirational success stories (Legend No. 17), legal order, scientific progress, family values, and the golden age of Russian literature. In 2015, the ministry spearheaded an initiative to adapt Russian cinemas for visually and hearing-impaired audiences by introducing audio descriptions and closed captioning.

=== Post-Ministerial career ===
In January 2020, Medinsky was not included in Mikhail Mishustin's new cabinet following criticism from Sergey Neverov and other United Russia party members. He was appointed Aide to the President of Russia by Vladimir Putin.

In February 2022, following the Russian invasion of Ukraine, Medinsky headed the Russian delegation in peace negotiations with Ukraine in Gomel, Belarus and Istanbul, Turkey. He was re-appointed as head of the Russian delegation for the 2025 negotiations in Istanbul.

In 2025, Medinsky was appointed the head of the Union of Russian Writers.

== Dissertations and accusation of plagiarism ==
From 1993 to 1997, Medinsky pursued postgraduate studies at MGIMO specializing in political science. In 1997, he defended his Candidate of Sciences thesis in political science, entitled "Current Stage of Global Development and Challenges in Shaping Russia's Foreign Policy", followed by a Doctor of Sciences thesis entitled "Theoretical and Methodological Issues in Formulating Russia's Foreign Policy Strategy within the Emerging Global Information Space" in 2000. At MGIMO, he progressed through academic ranks from instructor to full professor.

In June 2011 he defended a Doctor of Sciences thesis in history entitled "Problems of Objectivity in the Coverage of Russian History from the second half of the 15th to 17th centuries" at the Russian State Social University. This thesis has been widely debated in the Russian media and a large number of fragments have been shown to bear a significant resemblance to existing academic works, which caused numerous accusations of plagiarism.

On 23 May 2014, the Dissernet community, an informal group of academics and journalists concerned with dissertation plagiarism, declared to have found plagiarism in two previous dissertations by Medinsky, of 1997 and 1999. According to Dissernet's expertise, in the first thesis 87 pages out of 120 have been borrowed from the thesis of Medinsky's doctoral advisor Professor Sergey Proskurin. In the second thesis, 21 pages textually coincide with other people's works.

On 3 October 2017 the top Russian academic council recommended revoking Medinsky's 2011 doctorate. However, on 20 October 2017 a committee of a government agency that oversees the awarding of higher academic degrees ruled in the minister's favour by 16 to 6.

== Views ==
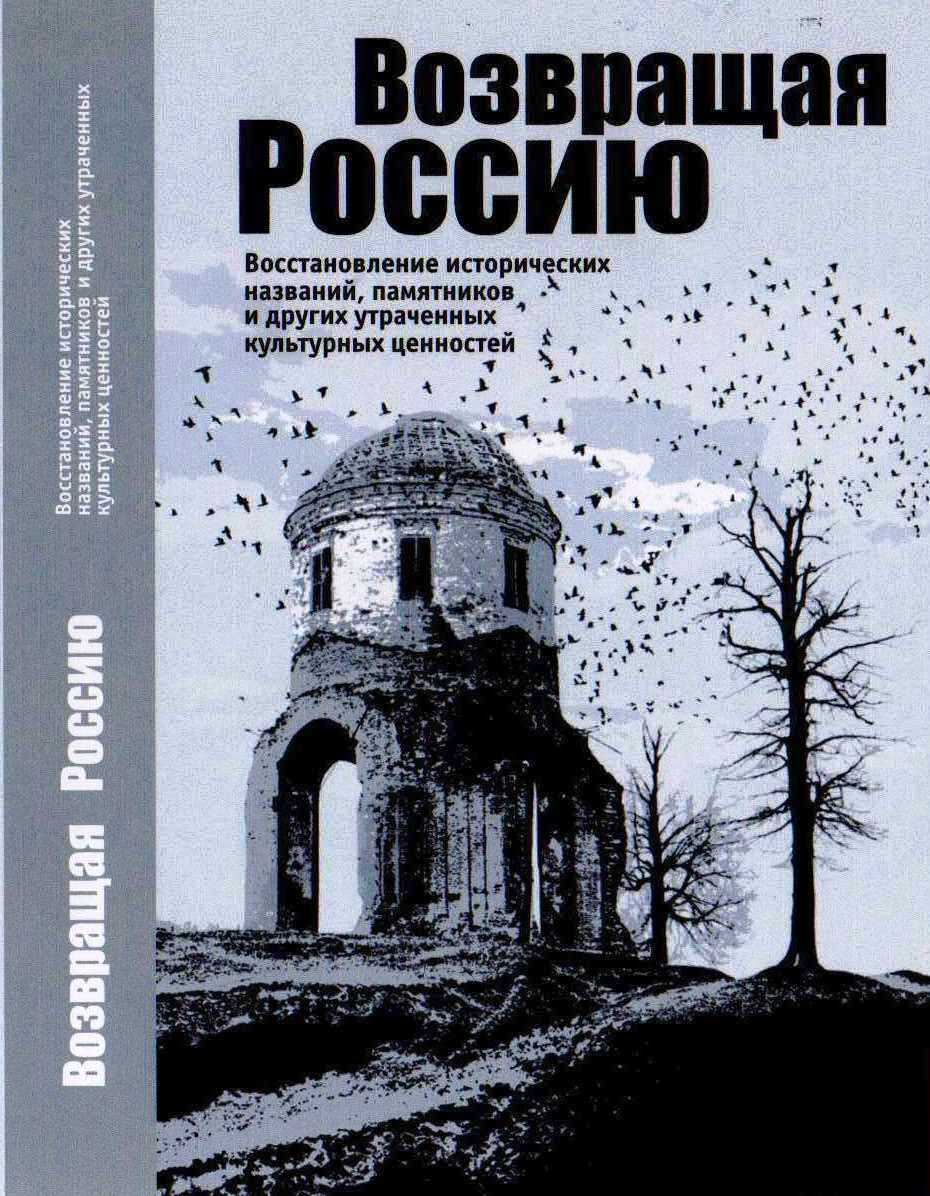
Returning Russia, a 2013 book on restoring historic place names and cultural objects, co-authored by Medinsky

Vladimir Medinsky has been described as a "nationalist enamoured of classicism and traditional values".

Medinsky supports the removal of Vladimir Lenin's body from Lenin's Mausoleum to bury it.

Medinsky believes that statues of Joseph Stalin should be erected in places where the majority of local people are in favour.

In 2013, Medinsky's Culture Ministry proposed an updated cultural policy blueprint. Calling for "a rejection of the principles of tolerance and multiculturalism", it emphasizes Russian "traditional values" and cautions against "pseudo-art" that may be at variance with those values.

In 2015, Medinsky called for the creation of a Russian "patriotic Internet" to combat Western ideas, adding that those who are against Russia are against the truth.

Under the initiative of the Russian Military-Historical Society chaired by Medinsky, several commemorative projects were implemented. In 2015, Moscow's "Ulitsa Podbelskogo" metro station was renamed "Bulvar Rokossovskogo", accompanied by the installation of an equestrian monument to Marshal Konstantin Rokossovsky. In 2018, a Moscow street was named after Alexander Pechersky, the organizer of the Sobibor extermination camp uprising. Through Medinsky's efforts, Pechersky was posthumously awarded the Order of Courage.

Medinsky called President Putin "an absolute genius of modern Realpolitik".

In 2019, Medinsky called the Chernobyl series "masterfully made" and "filmed with great respect for ordinary people". Medinsky's father was one of the Chernobyl liquidators.

Shortly after the start of the 2022 Russian invasion of Ukraine, Medinsky claimed that "We stand for peace".

In August 2023, a history textbook written by Medinsky claimed that the 1956 Hungarian Revolution was a fascist uprising organised by the West. In response, Hungary's Minister of Foreign Affairs and Trade Péter Szijjártó said "labelling these people as fascists is simply unacceptable". The textbook claims on page 393 that after the collapse of the Soviet Union, the "West became fixated with destabilising the situation inside Russia. The aim was not even hidden: to dismember Russia and to get control over its resources." Critics say the textbook spreads Kremlin propaganda and the worldview of Vladimir Putin.

In May 2025, Medinsky was leading a Russian delegation to a negotiation meeting with Ukraine in Istanbul, Turkey. He demanded that Ukraine should allow Russia to keep the Ukrainian regions that were occupied by Russia, and also to give up more land. He stated that Russia was prepared to fight the war for as many years as was necessary to achieve the Russian goals, and referred to the 18th century Russo-Swedish War, saying that it lasted for 21 years.

== Critics ==
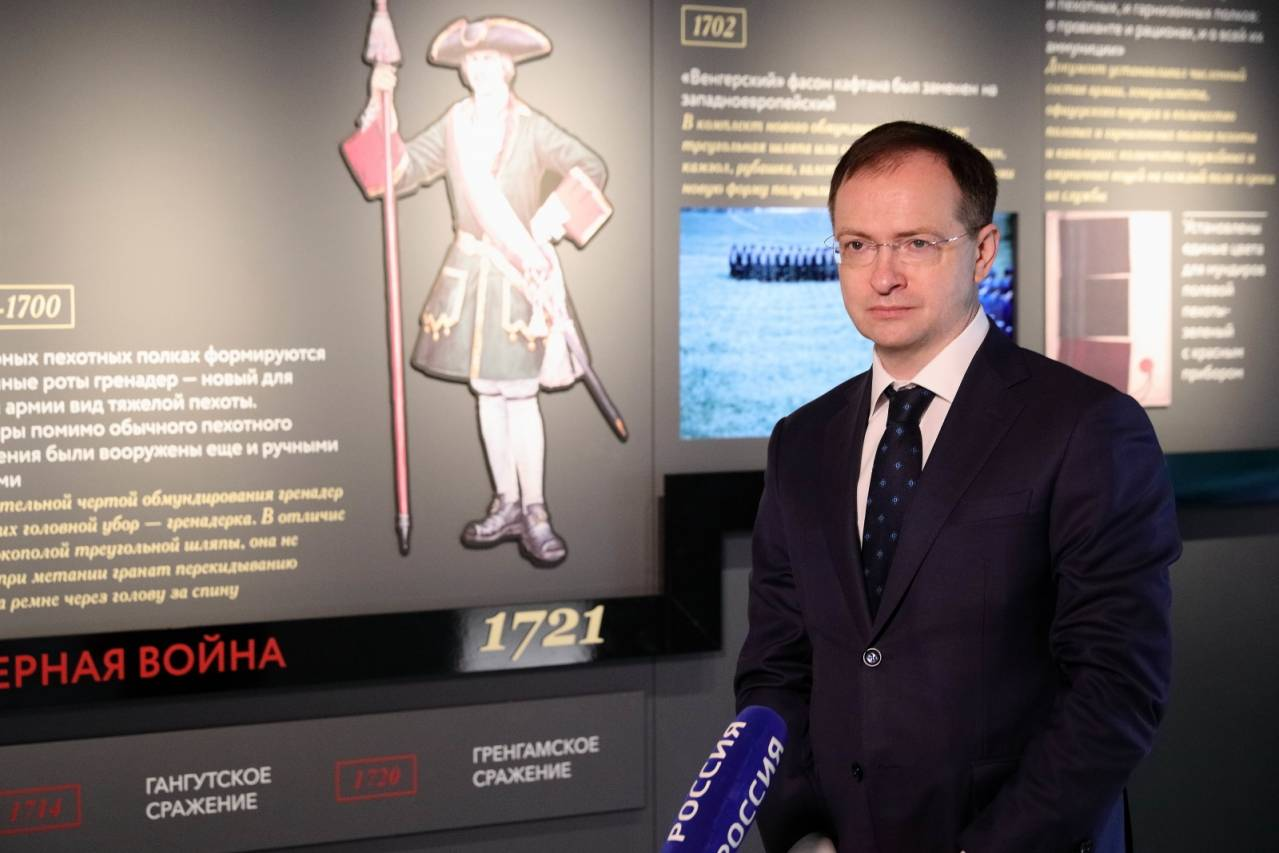
Vladimir Medinsky gives an interview to Russia-1, May 2020

Medinsky's appointment as Minister of Culture drew skepticism from many cultural figures, including actress Liya Akhedzhakova, filmmakers Alexander Sokurov and Yuli Gusman, and Ekaterina Genieva, director of the All-Russia State Library for Foreign Literature. Communist Party leader Gennady Zyuganov strongly opposed the appointment, describing Medinsky as "one of the most vicious Russophobes and anti-Soviet figures", with the Communist Party faction issuing an official protest.

One month after his appointment, Gazeta.Ru noted that while Medinsky's predecessors as culture ministers (Mikhail Shvydkoy, Aleksandr Sokolov, and Aleksandr Avdeyev) had all been respectable figures unquestionably viewed as members of intelligentsia by the cultural community, Medinsky's early weeks in office demonstrated that cultural leaders and officials were "clearly stunned by the arrival of a superior who doesn't even attempt to appear intellectual". Critics highlighted Medinsky's lack of relevant professional experience for the role. Journalist Andrey Piontkovsky compared him to the Third Reich's propaganda minister, while ex-Prime Minister Mikhail Kasyanov characterized him as part of Vladimir Putin's propaganda apparatus.

In January 2014, Medinsky participated in a discussion on Echo of Moscow radio concerning the history of the Great Patriotic War and its presentation in a unified history textbook. During the conversation about the Siege of Leningrad, the topic turned to "rum babas" (a type of pastry) allegedly baked for city officials, particularly Andrei Zhdanov. The show host noted that information about the confectionery workshop appeared in the 2013 reissue of The Siege Book by war veteran writer Daniil Granin, to which Medinsky responded: "That's a lie". The following day, Boris Vishnevskiy, a Yabloko party deputy in the Legislative Assembly of Saint Petersburg, demanded in an open letter that the minister either refute the facts presented in The Siege Book or apologize to the author. The ministry's press service stated that Medinsky's words had been misinterpreted and were not directed at Granin or his work. They also noted that pastries couldn't have been intended for Zhdanov, who was diabetic. In a February phone conversation with Granin, the misunderstanding was resolved.

In November 2014, the Ministry of Culture denied funding to the international documentary film festival Artdocfest. The decision was attributed to the political stance of the festival's president, Vitaly Mansky, which the minister described as "anti-state". Medinsky stated he would not approve funding for any of Mansky's projects while remaining in his ministerial position. This incident was followed by another controversy in January 2018, when the Ministry of Culture delayed issuing a distribution certificate for the film DAU. Degeneration and subsequently revoked the distribution certificate for The Death of Stalin, sparking public outcry.

In June 2016, a memorial plaque honoring Gustaf Mannerheim was unveiled on the building of the Military Engineering-Technical University in Saint Petersburg, with the participation of Medinsky and Sergei Ivanov, Chief of Staff of the Presidential Executive Office. During the ceremony, Medinsky stated that "erecting monuments to heroes of World War I represents an attempt to heal the tragic divisions in society". The initiative sparked public criticism, with the plaque repeatedly vandalized. A lawsuit was subsequently filed demanding its removal. By August 2016, on Medinsky's orders, the plaque was relocated to the World War I Museum in Tsarskoye Selo, which had been established two years earlier through the minister's personal initiative.

In October 2016, following the premiere of the film Panfilov's 28 Men (produced with financial support from the Ministry of Culture), Medinsky strongly criticized skeptics of the historical account. In a media interview, he labeled them as "utter scum" for questioning what he called the "sacred legend" of the 28 Panfilov soldiers, which he described as symbolizing the people's heroism during World War II.

The minister faced criticism from Sergey Neverov, leader of the United Russia parliamentary faction, who condemned the Ministry's unclear policy regarding film distribution certificates. The same day, State Duma deputy Olga Batalina voiced support for Medinsky, praising collaborative projects between the party and ministry aimed at preserving and developing cultural institutions across all levels, from small towns to rural settlements.

== Awards and honours ==
- 2020: Order of Alexander Nevsky
- 2018: Order of Friendship
- 2017: Order of Friendship (Kazakhstan), 2nd class
- 2017: Order of Holy Prince Daniel of Moscow, 2nd class
- 2015: Russian Federation Presidential Certificate of Honour
- 2015: Commander in the Order of Cultural Merit
- 2014: Order of Honour

== Bibliography ==
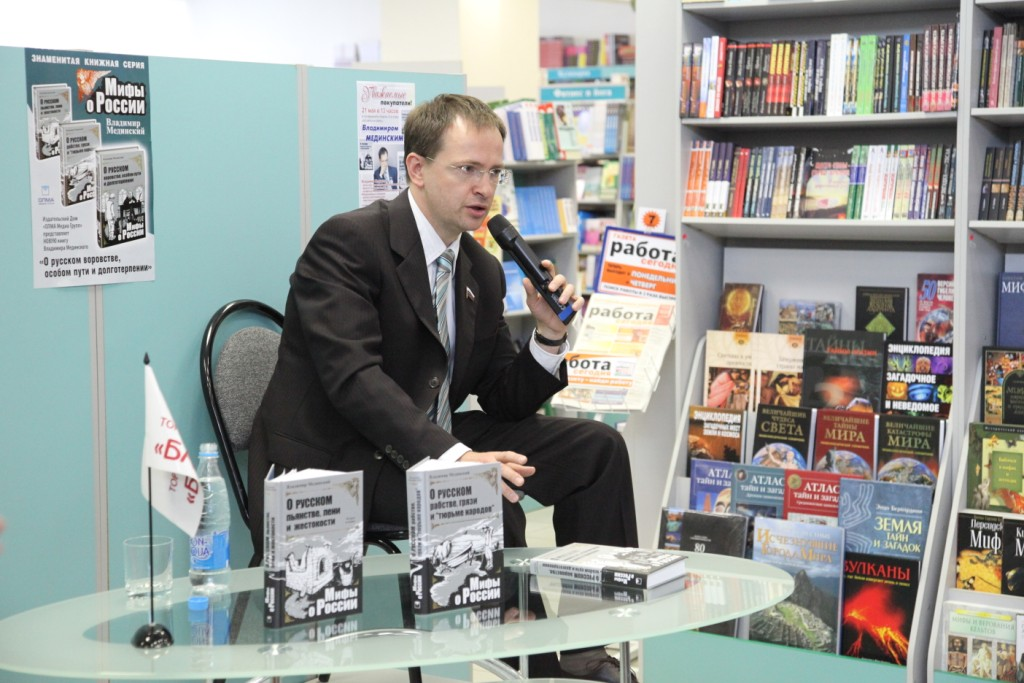
Medinskiy presents his books in Ryazan, 2009

- The Wall (Стена), 2012, ISBN 978-5-373-04522-3
- Myths about Russia (Мифы о России), Series of books by Vladimir Medinskiy
- Legal basis for commercial advertising by Vladimir Medinskiy and Kirill Vsevolozhskiy, ISBN 5-901084-01-2
- Scoundrels and geniuses PR. From Rurik to Ivan the Terrible by V. Medinskiy, 2011, ISBN 978-5-388-00487-1

Political offices
Preceded by Aleksander Avdeev	Russian Minister of Culture; 2012–2020	Succeeded by Olga Lyubimova
