= Ibero-American Cultural Centre =

Russian cultural and educational institution

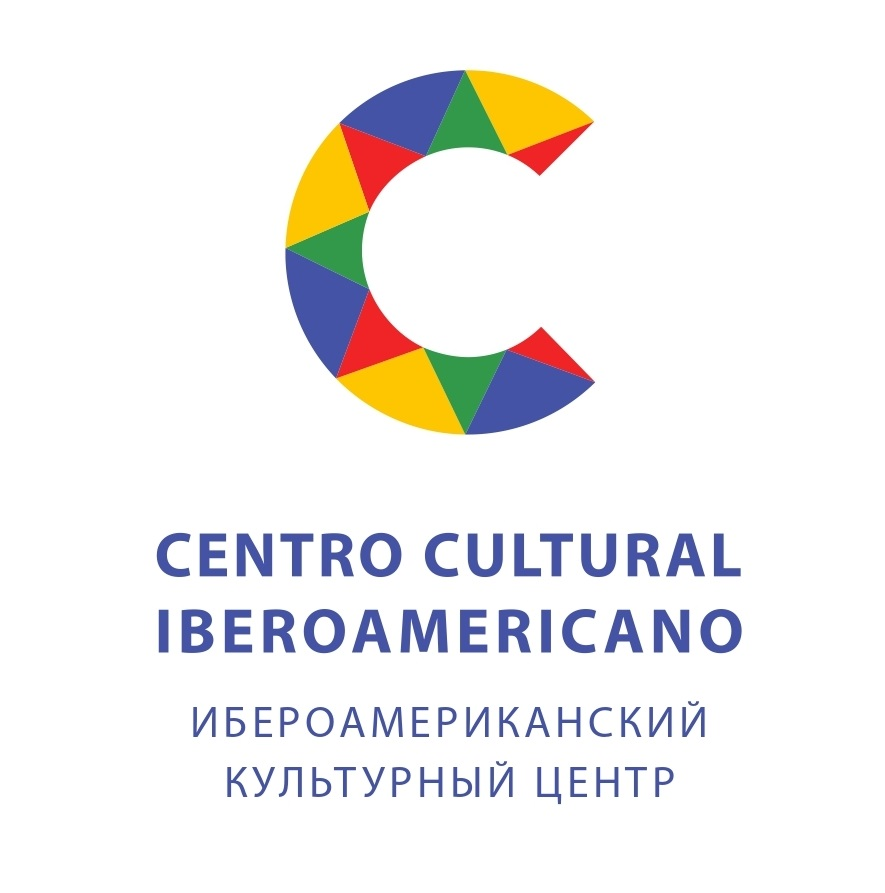

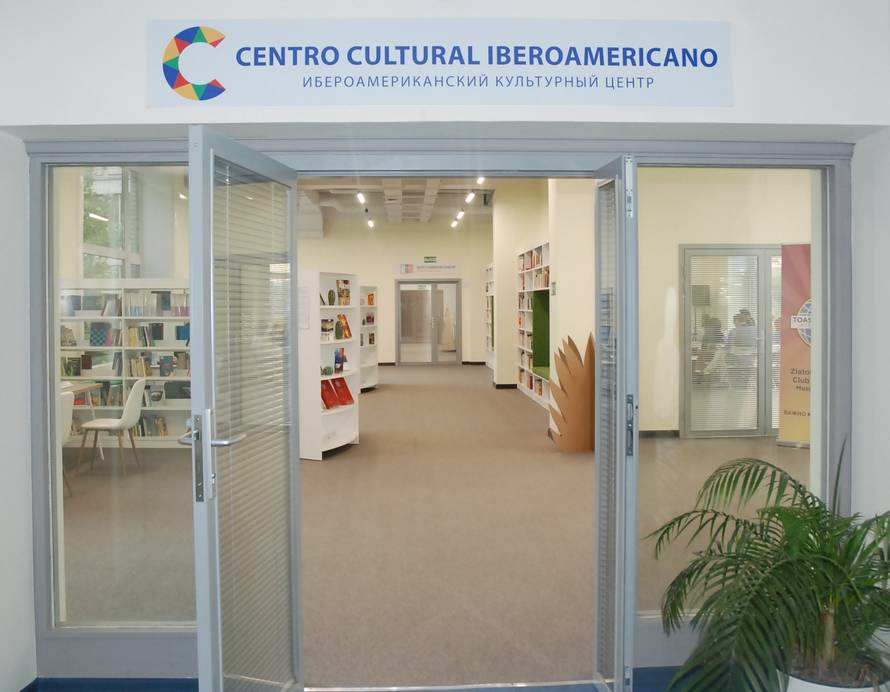
- Established: 21 May 2019 (7 years ago)

The Ibero-American Cultural Centre (Spanish: Centro Cultural Iberoamericano, Russian: Ибероамериканский культурный центр) is a cultural and educational institution founded on 21 May 2019 and developed with the support of the Russian Ministry of Culture and Ibero-American embassies, with the aim of promoting Ibero-American culture and languages. The center is part of Margarita Rudomino All-Russia State Library for Foreign Literature and has its own books fond, consisting in books in Spanish, Portuguese, Catalan, Galician and Russian.

== Activities ==
- Provide access to literature in Spanish and Portuguese, including electronic resources and scientific bases;
- Serve readers in the library and remotely;
- Organize and provide various cultural activities in offline and online format;
- Participation in forums, conferences and other activities.

== Activity formats ==
- Conversation clubs
- Open classes and webinars
- Expositions
- Book presentations
- Projections
- Lessons
- Round tables
- Poetic evenings
- Meetings with native speakers
- National holidays and festivals
