= Litvyak (film) =

- Directed by: Andrey Shalopa
- Written by: Andrey Shalopa
- Produced by: Andrey Shalopa
- Starring: Polina Chernyshova; Pyotr Rykov; Yevgeny Tkachuk; Viktoriya Solovyova; Ivan Shalopa; Andrey Nekrasov; Dmitry Girev; Pyotr Logachev
- Cinematography: Katerina Isakova
- Edited by: Ivan Shalopa
- Music by: Mikhail Kostylev
- Production companies: Panfilov's Twenty Eight; NTV; Cinema Fund; Ministry of Defence
- Distributed by: Cinema Atmosphere
- Release date: April 30, 2026 (Russia)
- Running time: 164 minutes
- Country: Russia
- Language: Russian
- Budget: ₽465 million
- Box office: ₽51 million

Litvyak (Russian: Литвяк) is a 2026 Russian biographical war film directed, written, and produced by Andrey Shalopa about a Soviet fighter pilot named Litvyak, who became the most successful female pilot during World War II. It stars Polina Chernyshova, Pyotr Rykov, and Yevgeny Tkachuk. The soundtrack for the film was written by Mikhail Kostylev.

The film was theatrically released in Russia on April 30, 2026, by Cinema Atmosphere.

== Plot ==
The film tells the story of Soviet fighter pilot Lydia Litvyak, an ace in her field and a true hero, who held the top spot in the international ranking of female combat pilots since August 1943. Only her best friend, Yekaterina Budanova, could come close to her achievement. Their regiment carried out heroic flights in Yakovlev Yak-1 fighters, providing cover for various attack aircraft, transports, and ground troops, fighting over Stalingrad, Rostov, and the Mius-Front against Nazi fighters, bombers, and reconnaissance aircraft. On August 1, 1943, 21-year-old Lydia was destined to take off in a plane and remain in the sky forever.

== Cast ==
- Polina Chernyshova as Lydia Litvyak
- Pyotr Rykov as Captain Aleksey Solomatin, the squadron commander, Litvyak's husband, their romance unfolds against the backdrop of war, constant sorties, and combat losses.
- Yevgeny Tkachuk as Nikolai Baranov, the commander of a fighter aviation regiment. Baranov is the mentor of the main character, pilot Litvyak. He is the one who announces the arrival of new experienced female pilots and makes decisions in combat situations.
- Viktoriya Solovyova as Yekaterina Budanova, a Soviet fighter pilot, Litvyak's friend and colleague.
- Ivan Shalopa as Samoilenko
- Andrey Nekrasov as Maryanov
- Dmitry Girev as Colonel Golyshev
- Pyotr Logachev as Borisenko
- Artur Sopelnik as Evdokimov
- Ivan Brovin as Gorkhiver
- Ales Snopkovsky as Pishkan
- Kirill Frolov as Radchenko
- Ivan Batarev as Gavrilov
- Eldar Safikanov as Maslov
- Gavriil Fedotov as Captain Osipov
- Maksim Blinov as Krasnov
- Anton Shpinkov as Menkov
- Arina Vartanyan as Anya Skorobogatova
- Natalya Kalinina as Anna, Litvyak's mother
- Alexey Shalopa as Yuri, Litvyak's brother

== Production ==
The Yakovlev Yak-1 fighter models were created using actual period drawings, a process that took the film crew eight months to complete. Not only the aircraft's exterior shape but also the cockpit interior were accurately captured.

=== Filming ===
The winter filming phase began in early February 2021 in the region of Orenburg Oblast. Soundstage filming, recreating interiors and aerial combat, continued at Lenfilm Studios (St. Petersburg) in late 2022 and throughout 2023. The team behind Panfilov's 28 Men is working on the film.

== Release ==
The film was originally scheduled for wide release on October 30, 2025, but was later moved to April 30, 2026.

Yana Zavatskaya spoke highly of the film.
