= No Looking Back (2021 film) =

- Directed by: Kirill Sokolov
- Written by: Kirill Sokolov
- Produced by: Artem Vasilyev; Igor Mishin; Elena Geladze; Aleksey Grishin; Andrey Savelyev
- Starring: Sofya Krugova; Viktoriya Korotkova; Anna Mikhalkova
- Cinematography: Dmitry Ulyukaev
- Edited by: Kirill Sokolov
- Music by: Maksim Rudenko
- Production companies: SAGa Film Company; MetraFilms; Kinoprime Foundation; Ministry of Culture; Online-cinema KION; KinoPoisk
- Distributed by: PROvzglyad
- Release dates: September 2021 (Kinotavr); April 21, 2022 (Russia)
- Running time: 101 minutes
- Country: Russia
- Language: Russian
- Box office: ₽9 million

No Looking Back (Russian: Оторви и выбрось) is a 2021 Russian dark comedy crime film written and directed by Kirill Sokolov. The film tells about three aggressive women's quarrels - a little daughter, her mother, and her grandmother are pointing guns at each other. It stars Sofya Krugova, Viktoriya Korotkova, and Anna Mikhalkova.

No Looking Back was theatrically released in Russia on April 21, 2022, by PROvzglyad.

== Plot ==
Olya was in prison for four years and decided to start a new life with the help of her daughter. But her daughter lives with her grandmother and she is not going to part with her granddaughter.

== Cast ==
- Sofya Krugova as Masha, a little daughter
- Viktoriya Korotkova as Olya, a mother
- Anna Mikhalkova as Vera, a grandmother
- Aleksandr Yatsenko as Oleg
- Olga Lapshina as a female prison warden
- Vitaly Khaev as warden's husband
- Daniil Steklov as warden's son
- Igor Grabuzov as a traffic cop
- Nikolay Schreiber as a truck driver

== Production ==
A full-length feature directed by Kirill Sokolov after the 2019 black comedy Why Don't You Just Die! how a men's son kills his father. The producers of the film are Artem Vasilyev and Igor Mishin, as well as Andrey Savelyev. The film is being shot with the support of the Ministry of Culture of the Russian Federation and the Kinoprime Foundation for the Development of Contemporary Cinematography, as well as with the participation of the SAGa Film Company.

=== Casting ===
This approach is due to the fact that the actress playing one of the main characters of the film, Sofya Krugova. Since the film was Sofya's debut acting work, the creators decided to shoot the comedy in chronological order according to the script, so that it would be easier for the girl to navigate.

=== Filming ===
Principal photography process was supposed to start back in May 2020, but due to the pandemic, it was postponed to early July. They will go to the city of Tver and Tver Oblast forest. At the very end, four shifts are planned in the backwater near the Volga River - in a remote and very picturesque place. A small interior block will be filmed in Moscow.

== Release ==
=== Theatrical ===
The film premiered in September 2021 at the Kinotavr Film Festival. Critics note the originality of Kirill Sokolov's directing style.

== See also ==
- Freeway (1996 film)
