= Margarita Rudomino =

Soviet librarian

- Born: 3 July 1900; Białystok, Congress Poland, Russian Empire
- Died: 9 April 1990 (aged 89); Moscow, Soviet Union
- Occupation: Librarian
- Known for: Founding the Margarita Rudomino All-Russia State Library for Foreign Literature

Margarita Ivanovna Rudomino (Russian: Маргарита Ивановна Рудомино; 3 July 1900 – 9 April 1990) was a Soviet librarian who founded what was later called the Margarita Rudomino All-Russia State Library for Foreign Literature. The library holds over four million books.

== Life ==
Rudomino was born in 1900 in Białystok, which is now in Poland, but was then part of the Russian empire. In 1921 she founded a library of foreign books in an old building in central Moscow. Rudomino grew the collection and studied in Denmark to understand western library techniques. The books in her library were catalogued according to the system used in the culture that created them.

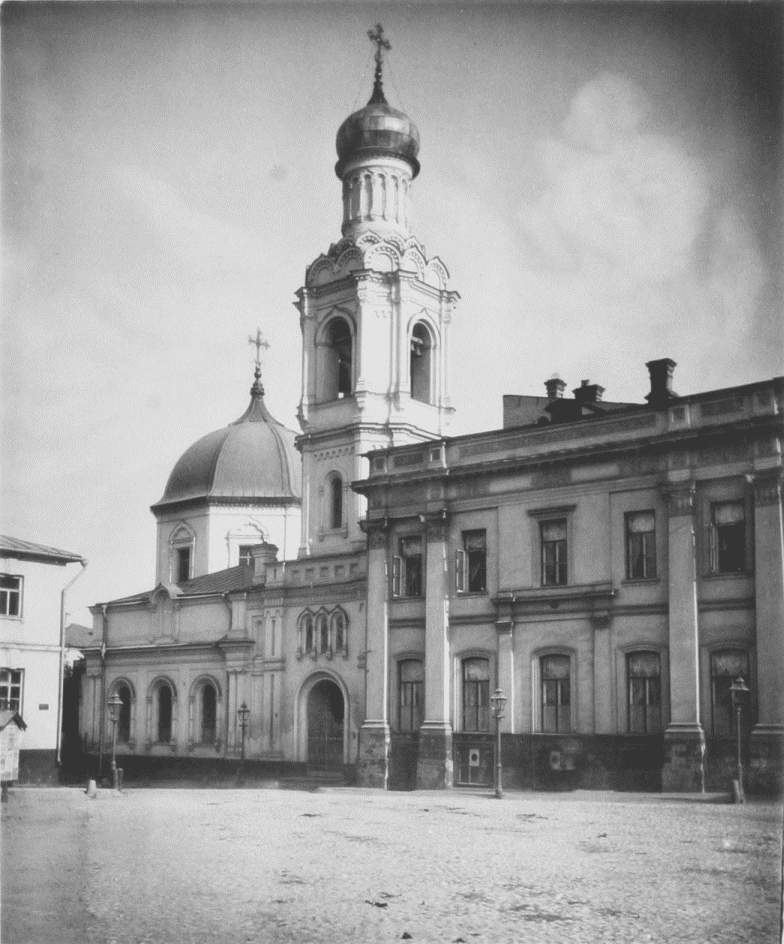
The building used in the 1930s

Rudomino's library became very important during the Cold War in the period between 1945 and 1953. During this period the average Russian could be arrested for having a copy of a foreign newspaper, but the work of the library continued and the library did not close. The library had German texts taken after World War Two, but Rudomino's library kept a flow of foreign science papers to enable Russian science to progress.

She received an Order of the Badge of Honour in 1962 and an Order of the Red Banner of Labour in 1970.

The library has been in constant existence but it did not find its current home until 1967.

Rudomino retired in 1973 and died in 1990. The library was renamed in her honour in 1990.
