= The Way Out (2015 film) =

2015 German-Russian short film

- Directed by: Mikhail Uchitelev
- Written by: Mikhail Uchitelev
- Produced by: Mikhail Uchitelev
- Starring: Elina Amromina; Alexander Alexeyev (Bredel); Aleksey Morozov; Tatiana Ryabokon; Artur Kharitonenko
- Cinematography: Mikhail Kotidi; Alexander Solovyov
- Edited by: Elina Amromina; Mikhail Uchitelev; Sergey Sobolev
- Music by: Vincenzo Bellini; Christoph Willibald Gluck; Michael Krausz
- Release date: May 2015 (Cannes)
- Running time: 33 minutes
- Countries: Germany; Russia
- Languages: Russian; German
- Budget: 312,000 Euro

The Way Out (Russian: Выход) (German: Der Auftritt) is a German-Russian 2015 short film directed, written and produced by Mikhail Uchitelev. It premiered in the Short Film Corner of the 2015 Cannes Film Festival. It was awarded the Grand Prix at the International Festival "Reflections of Spirit" in Erlangen, Germany, the Best Supporting Actor award at The Short Film Awards International Festival in New York, and the Best Actress award at the Blow-Up International Arthouse Film Festival. It was officially selected at the Roving Eye International Film Festival (the partner of the Oscar-qualifying Flickers' Rhode Island International Film Festival).

== Synopsis ==
The story unfolds in Eastern Europe during late 1941. Edith (portrayed by Elina Amromina) is a Jewish opera diva concealed from the Nazis by Gustav (played by Alexander Alexeyev), who shelters her in the theater's cellar during the occupation. Despite Gustav's assurances that she is safe, Edith recognizes the danger his help poses to his own life. Fearing for Gustav's safety, she resolves to leave the theater to protect him. Despite Gustav's attempts to convince her otherwise, Edith, consumed by terror, attempts to flee. Although Gustav manages to bring her back, their actions draw the attention of the Nazis. The Nazi commandant (played by Artur Kharitonenko) confronts Gustav, demanding that he surrender Edith or face death. Watching from a corner of the theater, Edith decides to go to the commandant's office and give herself up. Anticipating her move, Gustav tries to stop her, witnessing what he believes to be Edith's murder in the process. Unbeknownst to him, the victim is not Edith, who has instead locked herself in the cellar while she seeks another escape route. The following day, Edith resolves to go to the commandant's office and save Gustav's life. With the theater completely cordoned off, she sees only one possible route to safety.

== Cast ==
- Elina Amromina as Edith Goldschmidt
- Alexander Alexeyev as Gustav, a theater director
- Aleksey Morozov as Tenor
- Tatiana Ryabokon as Make-up artist
- Artur Kharitonenko as SS commandant

== Reception ==
The Way Out received generally positive reviews and the Saint Petersburg Evening Post praised the work for effectively using its 33-minute length to its advantage. A reviewer for Jüdische Rundschau gave a favorable review for the work, comparing it positively to Caravaggio's masterpieces. The Gazeta Strela also had praise for the film, which they felt told its story in a "heartfelt and intimate manner". The film has been officially presented at the Russian Pavilion at the Cannes Festival and this event has been covered by Proficinema. and also by ROSKINO. The film received a positive review at the TMFF.
