= Petr Rykov =

Russian media personage

- Пётр Рыков
- Born: Petr Sergeevich Rykov; December 30, 1981 (age 44); Novgorod, RSFSR, USSR
- Citizenship: Russian
- Education: Moscow Pushkin Drama Theatre
- Occupation: Actor
- Years active: 2010–present

Petr Sergeevich Rykov (Russian: Пётр Серге́евич Рыков, romanized: Pyotr Sergeyevich Rykov; born December 30, 1981) is a Russian actor, television host, musical performer and model.

== Biography ==
Petr Rykov was born in Novgorod, Russian SFSR, Soviet Union (now Veliky Novgorod, Russia).

Soon after his birth, Rykov's family moved to Smolensk, where he spent his childhood. After graduating from high school, he attended the Mikhail Glinka School of Music for three years (1998–2001) and specialized in classical guitar. In 2001, Rykov changed his field of study to foreign languages at the Smolensk University of Liberal Arts. Later he moved to Moscow and continued his studies at the Moscow Humanities Institute. He completed his career in 2006 with a diploma of a certified translator for English and German.

Between 2006 and 2010 Rykov has worked as a model for such fashion houses as Dolce & Gabbana, Armani, Neil Barrett, Esquire, Maison Bohemique and Henderson.{ In 2007 Rykov was a co-host of the talent contest STS sazhigaet superzwesdu (STS is Looking for the Superstar) at the Russian television channel STS.

From 2009 to 2010 Rykov completed a basic course at the Hermann Sidakov Drama School in Moscow. Afterwards he started studying acting at the Russian State Institute of Cinema (VGIK) and completed it successfully in 2014 as a professional actor (master class of Igor Nikolaevich Yasulovich).

Rykov is working at the Moscow Pushkin Drama Theatre as well as at the Moscow Tabakov Theatre. Currently he is involved in different films and television series produced in Russia and Ukraine.

In 2019 Rykov founded his own music band called Stone.

== Theatre ==
=== Hermann Sidakov Drama School ===
- A. Chekhov "The Seagull", drama (directed by N. Konykova) as Boris Alekseevich Trigorin, author
- F. M. Dostoevsky "The Idiot" (monologue and directed by V. Lobacheva) as Rogozhin
- M. Bulgakov "The Days of the Turbins", drama play (directed by A. Nosatova and D. Barin) as Nikolai Turbin
- A. Chekhov "Ivanov", play (directed by S. Igolkina) as Yevgeny Konstantinovich Lvov, young country doctor

=== Moscow Pushkin Theatre ===
- 2012 — "La grande magia", play by Eduardo De Filippo, directed by Ye. Pisarev as supporting role
- 2013 — "The Lady of the Camellias" Alexandre Dumas the Younger, direction and choreography by S. Zemlyansky as Baron de Varville Junior
- 2013 — "Measure for Measure", comedy by W. Shakespeare, directed by Declan Donnellan as young nobleman Claudio
- 2014 — "O. Henry Christmas stories", musical by P. Extroma, translation and direction by Al. Frandetti as Jim
- 2016 — "The House That Swift Built" by Grigori Gorin, directed by Ye. Pisarev as savant

=== Moscow Tabakov Theatre ===
- 2017 — "Stage Beauty", play by Jeffrey Hatcher (Complete Female Stage Beauty), directed by Ye. Pisarev as George Villiers, 2nd Duke of Buckingham

== Selected filmography ==
- 2013: The Destroyers (Истребители Istrebiteli) as Vasilev
- 2013: The Fate (Рок Rok, short film) as Shmon
- 2014: The Ship (Корабль Korabel) as Andrej
- 2015: I Remember — I Don't Remember! (Помню — не помню Pomnju — ne pomnju!) as Nikita
- 2015: Quest (Квест) as Grek (Greek)
- 2015: A Look from the Past (Взгляд из прошлого Vzglyad iz proschlogo) as Marc Sosnovsky
- 2015: The Mothers (Мамочки Momotshki, TV series, 1st season) as Sveta's ex-husband
- 2015: The Roof of the World (Крыша мира Krysha mira) as Marc
- 2015: The Winged Ones (Окрылённые Okrylennye) as Dieter
- 2016: Lie to be Saved (Ложь во спасение Lozh vo spasenie) as journalist Andrej Zabrodin
- 2016: The Jackal (Шакал Shakal, TV series) — Clyde Barrow
- 2016: The Hunters (Охотники Okhotniki, historical series) as iillegal seller Ilya
- 2017: Maximum Impact as episode
- 2017: Nothing Happens Twice (Ничто не случается дважды Nichto ne sluchaetsya dwazhdy, series) as Jury Potechin
- 2017: The Optimists (Оптимисты Optimisty, television series) — musician Ilya
- 2017: The Road to Calvary (TV series) — Officer Zhukov
- 2018: Cursed Seat as a guy from the legend
- 2018: The Birch (Берёзка Beryozka, TV series) — Aleksej Pokrovsky, superstar of the dance ensemble "The Birch".
- 2018: The Bloody Lady (Кровавая барыня Krovavaya Barinya) — Sergej Saltykov, lover of Darya Saltykova
- 2019: Godunov. The Continuation. (Годунов. Продолжeние. Godunov. Prodolshenie., television series) — Vasily Golitsyn
- 2019: The Defendant (Подсудимый Podsudumiy) as Aleksej Nesterov and his twin brother Dimitrij Nesterov
- 2019: Hide and Seek (Прятки Pryatki) as Maxim Shumov
- 2019: Dr. Baby Dust 4 (Женский доктор Zhenskiy doktor, television series, 4th season) as Alexander Radionov, doctor
- 2020: Rikoshet (Рикошет) as Pavel Belov, policeman
- 2020: Before It's Too Late (Успеть всё исправить Uspet vse ispravit, mini series) — businessman Egor Kormilzev
- 2021: Together Forever (Вместе навсегда Vmeste navsegda) as businessman Roman Gordeev
- 2022: Monastery as Sergey
- 2024: Angels Don't Buzz as man in car
- 2025: Kraken as Shirokorad
- 2026: Litvyak as Aleksei Solomatin

== Music videos ==
- 2010 — "Unsuccessful Surrender (Явка провалилась Yawka prowalilas)" by Mikhail Kharlamov (Studio GS)
- 2013 — "Don't Be Born Beautiful (Не родись красивой Ne rodis krasiwoy)" by music band "Fabrika"
- 2013 — "Zolla" commercial
- 2014 — "Maison Bohemique" video lookbook of the spring collection
- 2014 — "Superhero" by Basta (soundtrack to the movie The Amazing Spider-Man 2: Rise of Electro)
- 2015 — "With Golden Fish (Золотыми рыбками Zolotymi rybkami)" by MaxSim
- 2017 — "The Bridges (Mосты Mosty)" by Anna Ryapsova
- 2017 — "I Am Alone (Я одна Ya odna)" by Kristina Orsa
- 2017 — "An Extreme Journey Through Russia (Экстремальная поездочка по России Ekstremalnaya poesdochka po rossii)" TV commercial by Tinkoff Bank
- 2022 — "Pıyala (Пыяла)" by Aigel

== Awards and nominations ==
- 2011 — Saint Anna Film Festival for his performance in the short film Without Words by Ivan Shakhnazarov.
