= Cursed Seat =

2018 Russian supernatural horror film

- Directed by: Nadezhda Mikhalkova
- Written by: Presnyakov brothers
- Produced by: Nadezhda Mikhalkova; Anna Mikhalkova; Katerina Komolova; Oleg Presnyakov; Vladimir Presnyakov; Karina Sinenko
- Starring: Alexey Dyakin; Anna Mikhalkova; Irina Martynenko
- Cinematography: Mikhail Hasaya
- Edited by: Lyubava Nechistyak; Tim Pavelko
- Music by: Igor Vdovin
- Production companies: Aurora Film; VVP Alliance
- Distributed by: WDSSPR
- Release date: November 1, 2018
- Running time: 95 minutes
- Country: Russia
- Language: Russian

Cursed Seat (Russian: Проигранное место, romanized: Proigrannoe mesto) is a Russian slasher film directed by Nadezhda Mikhalkova. The premiere of film in Russia took place on November 1, 2018.

== Plot ==
Among schoolchildren there is a legend about the so-called lost place, according to which everyone who buys a movie ticket to this place is waiting for death. None of the guys believe in it, but a series of brutal murders makes young people think, as a result of which they begin their own investigation.

== Cast ==
- Alexey Dyakin as Anton
- Anna Mikhalkova as Maria
- Irina Martynenko as Katya
- Nikita Yelenev as Roma
- Alexey Martynov as Yura
- Petr Rykov as guy from the legend

== Reviews ==
- The Hollywood Reporter Russia: Cursed Seat can not be called an unambiguous success. it has a number of shortcomings and problems that are worth paying attention to. Nevertheless, for the Russian genre picture the result is worthy.
