= Anna Mikhalkova =

Russian actress (born 1974)

- Анна Михалкова
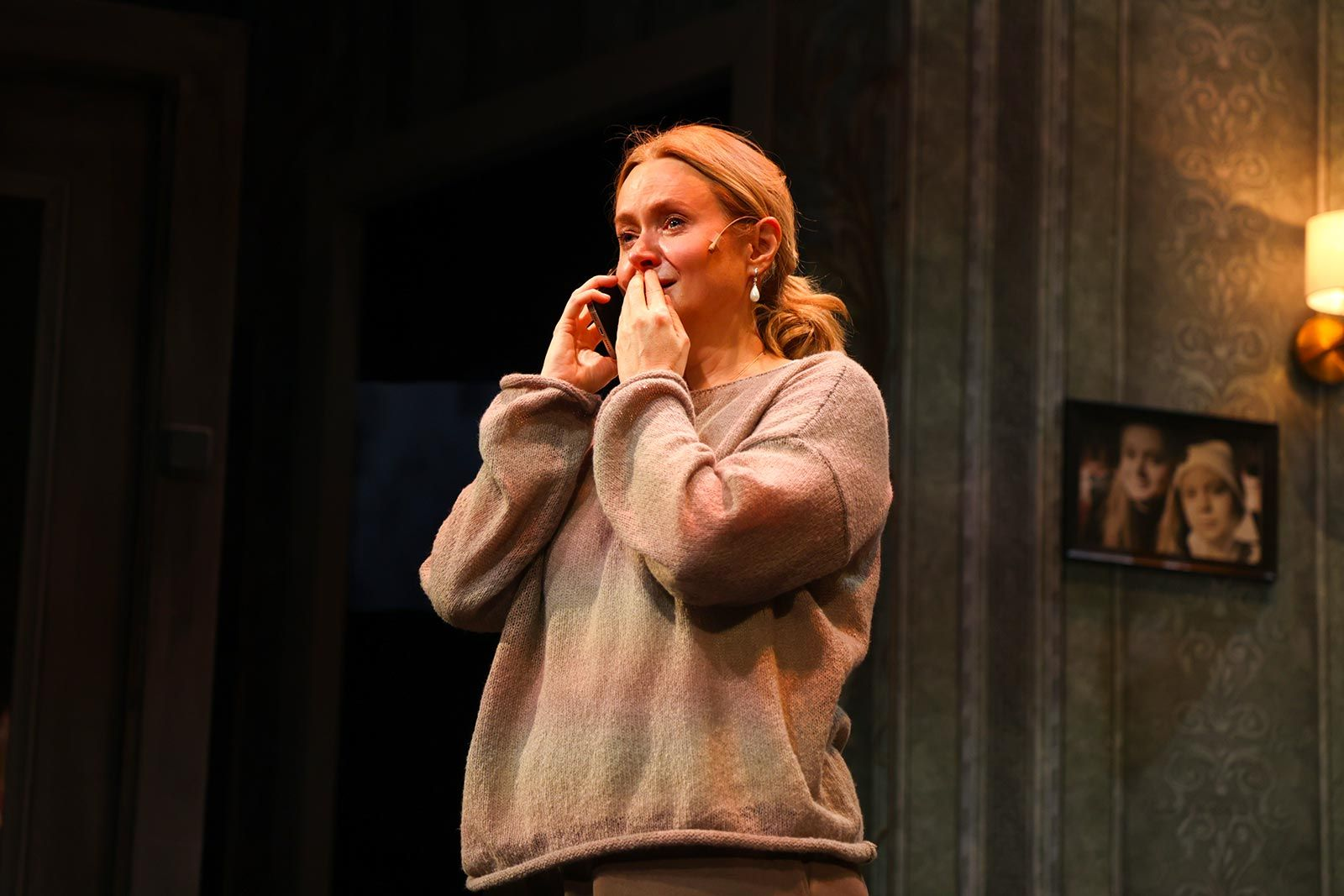
- Born: Anna Nikitichna Mikhalkova; 14 May 1974 (age 52); Moscow, Russian SFSR, Soviet Union
- Occupations: Actress; TV presenter; film producer; cinematographer
- Years active: 1987–present
- Spouse: Albert Bakov (m. 1997–2006; 2007–present)
- Children: 3
- Parent(s): Nikita Mikhalkov; Tatyana Mikhalkova
- Relatives: Stepan Mikhalkov (half-brother); Artyom Mikhalkov (brother); Nadezhda Mikhalkova (sister)

Anna Nikitichna Mikhalkova (Russian: А́нна Ники́тична Михалко́ва; born 14 May 1974) is a Russian actress, film producer, cameraman, TV presenter; Merited Artist of the Russian Federation (2019). She is a member of the All-Russian public organization Union of Cinematographers of the Russian Federation in Moscow.

== Early life and ancestry ==
Born into an old, noble Mikhalkov family, she is the eldest daughter of Nikita Mikhalkov.

== Career ==
In 2011, she starred in the television series Univer. New Dorm. Her film credits include Our Own, Kokoko and Rasputin. Her television credits include Zhizn i sudba and Burnt by the Sun 2. Since 2002, she has presented the children's television program Spokoynoy nochi, malyshi!.

She won a number of movie awards for her acting in different years: TEFI, Nika Awards, Golden Eagle Awards, APKIT Awards, New York Film Awards, Russian Guild of Cinematographers, Russian Guild of Film Critics, Sochi Open Russian Film Festival ets.

== Selected filmography ==
=== Film ===
- Anna: 6–18 (Анна: от 6 до 18, 1993) as herself
- Revizor (Ревизор, 1996) as Mariya Antonovna
- The Barber of Siberia (Сибирский цирюльник, 1998) as Dunyasha
- Our Own (Свои, 2004) as Katerina
- Dark Planet (Обитаемый остров, 2008) as Ordi Tader
- I Am (Я, 2009) as Kalitka, head doctor
- Burnt by the Sun 2 (Утомлённые солнцем 2: Цитадель, 2010) as Nura the woman in labor
- Raspoutine (Распутин, 2011) as Anna Vyrubova
- The PyraMMMid (ПираМММида, 2011) as Mamontov's wife
- My Dad Baryshnikov (Мой папа Барышников, 2011)
- Love with an Accent (Любовь с акцентом, 2012)
- Selfie (Селфи, 2018) as Vika
- Story of One Appointment (История одного назначения, 2018) as Anna Ivanovna
- Cursed Seat (Проигранное место, 2018) as Mariya
- Another Woman (Давай разведёмся, 2019) as Masha
- House Arrest (2021)
- No Looking Back (2021)
- Nika (2022)
- Catherine the Great (Екатерина Великая, 2025) as Catherine II

=== TV ===
- Good Night, Little Ones! (Спокойной ночи, малыши!, 2002-present) as herself (host)
- Heavenly Court (Небесный суд, 2011, 2014) as Lucia Arkadievna
- Univer. New Dorm (Универ. Новая общага, 2011, 2018) as Polina
- An Ordinary Woman (Обычная женщина, 2018) as Marina Lavrova
- Vertinsky (Вертинский, 2021) as Alexandra Burkovskaya
