= Andrey Shalopa =

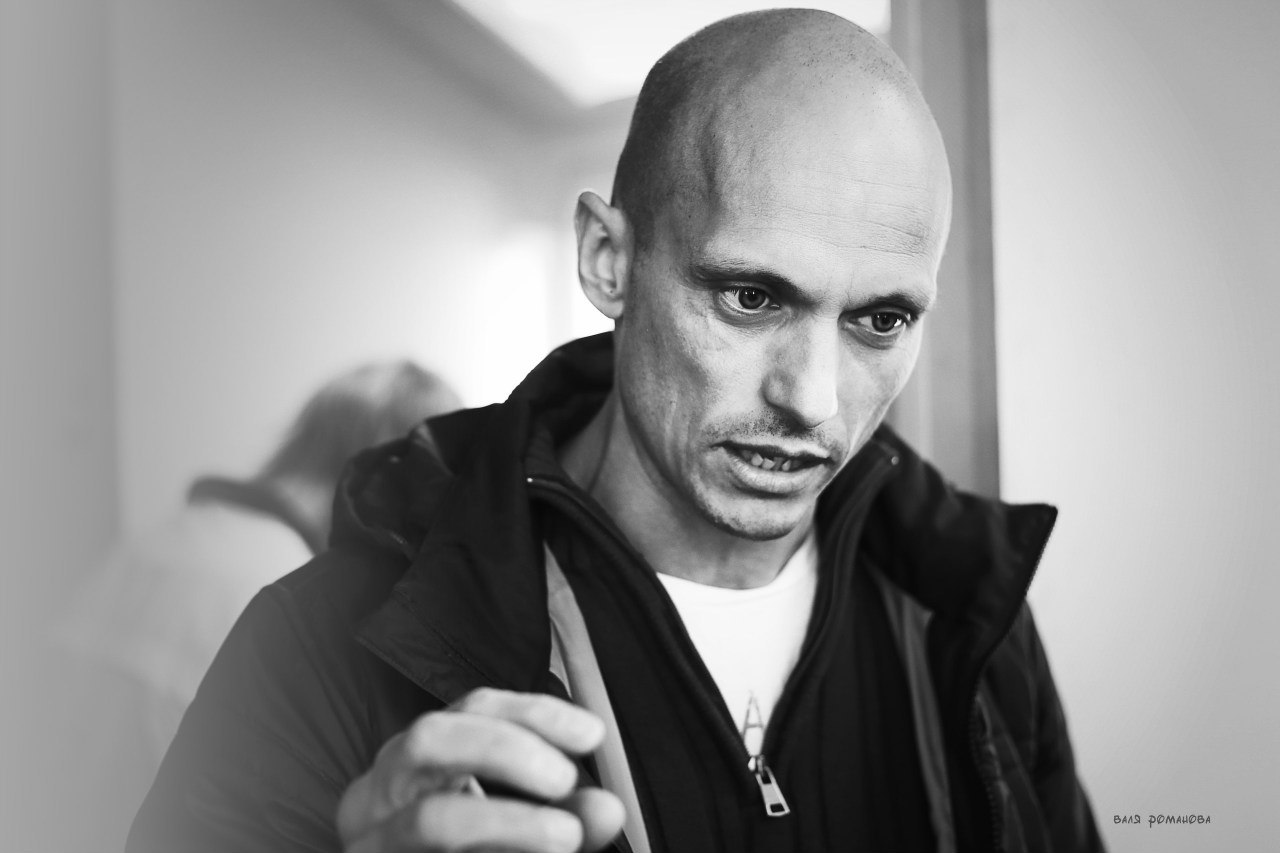
- Andrey Shalyopa in 2013
- Born: Andrey Gennadievich Shalopa; February 19, 1972 (age 54); Leningrad, Soviet Union (now Russia)
- Citizenship: Russian Federation
- Occupations: film director, film producer, screenwriter, actor

Andrey Gennadievich Shalopa (Russian: Андре́й Генна́дьевич Шальо́па, born February 19, 1972) – is a Russian film director, producer, screenwriter, actor. He is best known for the film Panfilov's 28 Men.

Year	Film	Director	Producer	Writer	Actor	Notes	Ref.
2008	Poymat vedmu	Yes	Yes	Yes	Yes		
2016	Panfilov's 28 Men	Yes	Yes	Yes	Yes		
2016	2026	Litvyak (film)	Yes	Yes	Yes	Yes	
