= Kraken (2025 film) =

- Theatrical release poster
- Russian: Кракен
- Directed by: Nikolai Lebedev
- Screenplay by: Aleksey Sidorov; Nikolai Lebedev
- Produced by: Leonid Vereshchagin; Anton Zlatopolsky; Nikita Mikhalkov; Ruben Dishdishyan
- Starring: Alexander Petrov; Viktor Dobronravov; Aleksei Guskov; Diana Pozharskaya; Anton Rival; Sergei Garmash
- Cinematography: Sergey Machilsky
- Edited by: Helios Chucka
- Music by: Artyom Vasiliev
- Production companies: Central Partnership Productions; Russia-1; TriTe; Cinema Fund
- Distributed by: Central Partnership
- Release date: April 17, 2025 (Russia)
- Running time: 134 minutes
- Country: Russia
- Language: Russian
- Budget: ₽1.2 billion
- Box office: ₽1.1 billion

Kraken (Russian: Кракен) is a 2025 Russian monster film directed by Nikolai Lebedev, who co-wrote the screenplay with Aleksey Sidorov. The film stars Alexander Petrov, Viktor Dobronravov, Aleksei Guskov, Diana Pozharskaya, Anton Rival, Sergei Garmash, and others.

== Plot ==
In the Arctic Ocean, close to the North Pole, geologists Julia (Diana Pozharskaya) and Oskar (Anton Rival) are conducting a series of hydrological experiments for a Swedish expedition using explosive charges. Nearby, the experimental submarine Ataman Yermak is transiting the area while under the sea ice, under the command of Captain First Rank Alexander Voronin (Viktor Dobronravov). At the same time, Julia and Oskar crash their snowmobile, before seeing their camp completely enveloped into the ice. The crew of Ataman Yermak report activity of an unknown nature, before foundering as a result of critical damage. As the submarine goes under, the crew jettison the vessels emergency locator beacon.

In response, the Russian Navy despatches the submarine Zapolyarye on a rescue mission. Ataman Yermak was carrying a secret experimental weapon, which must now be destroyed at all costs. Admiral Belousov (Sergei Garmash) appoints Captain Second Rank Viktor Voronin (Alexander Petrov), Alexander Voronin's younger brother as commander of the Zapolyarye. They share a complex family relationship. Counter Admiral Olshansky (Aleksei Guskov) is dispatched alongside Viktor, who could assume command if Voronin, due to the personal nature of the operation, is unable to effectively command. Zapolyarye is additionally loaded with a deep submergence rescue vehicle for the operation. Viktor is given his father's dive watch, which his brother forget to take with him.

Meanwhile, Julia and Oskar find the emergency beacon. Zapolyarye also identify the signal from the beacon and begin to plot a course towards it. The vessel encounters a large pod of whales exhibiting unusual behaviour, using the ships sonar to disperse the animals. An unidentified creature is spotted close to the vessel. Olshansky insists on engaging the anomaly with the ships torpedoes, while Voronin decides to hide the submarine among the sea ice, narrowly escaping the creature while sustaining minor damage to the ship, to the disapproval of Olshansky. The crew rescue Julia and Oskar.

Olshansky wishes to return to Murmansk, while Voronin decides to continue the search. Olshansky warns him that this was his second mistake, and would be relieved of command if he made another. With the kraken still on their tail, Zapolyarye passes by a Norwegian oil rig, which is quickly subsumed by the creature, which continues towards the submarine. Olshansky states that this is Voronin's third mistake, and relieves him of command, attempting to attack the Kraken by firing the submarines torpedoes, to little success. In shock Olshansky freezes, with Voronin reassuming command and ordering the submarine to crash dive and turn off all nonessential equipment. With the damage sustained, Voronin decides to return to base.

Julia visits Voronin and reveals that the researchers had disturbed the Kraken, a colossal monster lurking on the seabed. Julia states that the monsters lair may have been located at the site of the experiments in the Nansen Basin, suggesting that Ataman Yermak may be found there. A faint metallic knocking sound is also heard on sonar, located in the same area. As a result Voronin decides to continue the search, reaching an abyss. The deep submergence rescue vehicle piloted by Koshkin (Sergei Kempo) is deployed to search for the missing submarine. Amidst a graveyard of ships, the wreckage of Ataman Yermak is found, with its stern destroyed but bow section intact. Upon docking and entering the escape trunk, Voronin discovers several of the crew of Ataman Yermak are alive, including his brother Alexander Voronin. The most severely injured crew members are evacuated on the small DSRV, while Viktor, Alexander and several crew members remain aboard Ataman Yermak to disable its experimental weapon. Koshkin leaves a locator beacon on the hull of the ship, but turns it off after remembering Viktor's orders.

The scientist Oskar offers to assist Koshkin in returning the DSRV for the second time to Ataman Yermak. Unable to locate the wreck, the locator beacon is reactivated. With the beacon back on, the kraken returns in pursuit of Zapolyarye. Severely damaged, the ship is forced to surface. Meanwhile the DSRV reached the wreck site, but with the kraken in close pursuit. As a result, Viktor and Alexander decide to activate the ships experimental weapon, firing a large energy beam into the air killing the monster. After initiating the weapons self-destruct sequence, the remaining crew narrowly escape to the DSRV, with the bow section tumbling into the abyss. The submarine detonates, with the rescue vehicle sent spinning.

Zapolyarye waits on the surface led by Olshansky, with the DSRV surfacing with a triumphant Viktor and Alexander. Viktor offers the dive watch, with Alexander stating that Viktor had earned it. The submarine returns to Kola Bay, with Viktor and Alexander together atop the submarines conning tower.

== Cast ==
- Alexander Petrov as Viktor Voronin
- Viktor Dobronravov as Alexander Voronin
- Aleksei Guskov as Counter Admiral Olshansky
- Diana Pozharskaya as Julia Brown, a Swedish scientist with Russian roots who finds herself on a boat and seems to fall in love with the captain
- Anton Rival as Oskar, a French scientist and Julia Brown's colleague
- Sergei Garmash as Admiral Belousov
- Nikolai Kozak as Vice Admiral Sokolov
- Aleksandr Ratnikov as Tatarinov
- Sergei Kempo as Valera Koshkin
- Oleg Gaas as Ipatov, commander of the hydroacoustic group
- Daniil Popov as Antushev
- Vladislav Khitrik as Mishukov, a navigator
- Spartak Sumchenko as Sekach
- Petr Rykov as Shirokorad
- Vasily Brichenko as Tarasyuk
- Egor Kharlamov as Prudnikov
- Dmitry Sokolov as Safonov
- Sergei Khachaturov as Tapazyan, an officer
- Filipp Ershov as Varikash, a chief cook
- Aleksandr Palchikov as Dorodnov
- Aleksandr Brykin as Erykalov, acoustician
- Kirill Antonov as Stenko
- Mikhail Evlanov as a physician
- Sergei Boytsov as Mitya Mekhanikov, a rescued sailor from the sunken submarine Ataman Yermak
- Mikhail Danilyuk as Polivtsev
- Stanislav Demushin as Panov, a sailor
- Miroslav Dushenko as Roshchin
- Danil Nikitin as Vasilev, a sailor
- Lev Semashkov as Zubov
- Denis Khokhrin as Golubev
- Anton Shokalyuk as Ivanov, a sailor
- Vitaly Konovalov as Vitaly, a sailor
- Yuri Plotnikov as a sailor
- Aleksey Protsenko as a sailor
- Roman Dudich as Semyon, a mechanic
- Kristina Brodskaya as Irina Voronina, Alexander Voronin's wife
- Anna Kamenkova as Viktor and Alexander Voronin's mother
- Konstantin Khabensky as the father's voice

== Production ==
The film has been in development since 2021. Central Partnership Film Studio was in charge of production. Nikita Mikhalkov's TriTe Studio also participated, with support from the Russia-1 television channel and the Cinema Fund.

=== Filming ===
The film's location shoots took place in the autumn of 2023 in the towns of Severomorsk and Zaozyorsk, Murmansk Oblast, and then continued in Tula and Moscow. The film was shot in the Murmansk Oblast, among ice floes in temperatures down to -25 degrees Celsius.

The actors had to warm themselves up with hot tea and use portable heaters. The film's creators used the interiors of the Severodvinsk ship, which was docked in the town of Severomorsk, Murmansk Oblast, as the Zapolyarye boat. All the actors had to undergo training on evacuating through the hatches of a real submarine. Thirty sailors from the Northern Fleet were recruited as extras. They were also responsible for instructing the film crew.

== Reception ==
=== Critical response ===
Yulia Shagelman in Kommersant described the film as being made according to 1990s Hollywood standards and belonging to the creature feature genre. Pavel Voronkov (Gazeta.ru) described Kraken as a film devoid of deep ideology, yet spectacular and dynamic, living up to audience expectations. He described the film as "deliciously absurd," at times reminiscent of Roland Emmerich's Hollywood blockbusters, and, despite the absurdity of the proceedings, it keeps the viewer entertained.

== See also ==
- Kraken (2026 film) – A Norwegian film about similar scenario.
