= Olga Lyubimova =

Russian politician (born 1980)

- Ольга Любимова
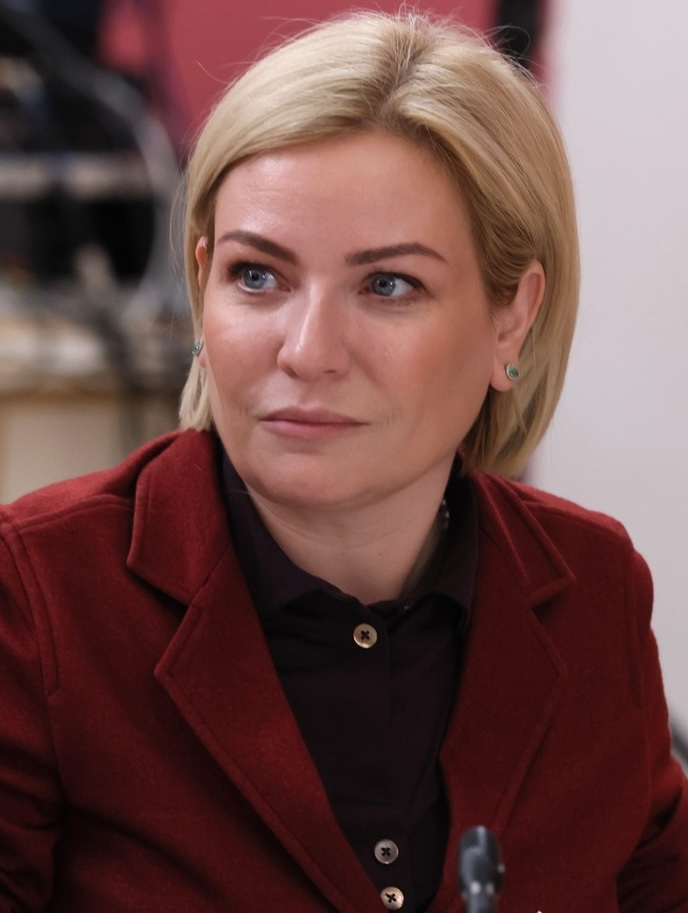
- Lyubimova in 2024

Minister of Culture
- Incumbent
- Assumed office 21 January 2020
- Prime Minister: Mikhail Mishustin
- Preceded by: Vladimir Medinsky

Personal details
- Born: 31 December 1980 (age 45) Moscow, Soviet Union
- Education: Moscow State University, Russian Institute of Theater Arts
- Website: Olga Lyubimova

Olga Borisovna Lyubimova (Note: In this name that follows East Slavic naming customs, the patronymic is Borisovna and the family name is Lyubimova.) (Russian: Ольга Борисовна Любимова; born 31 December 1980) is a Russian politician serving as the Minister of Culture of the Russian Federation. She was appointed on 21 January 2020.

Prior to her current appointment, Lyubimova has served the Deputy Minister of Culture since 2015 and as the head of its cinematography department since 2018.

== Early life and education ==
She is the daughter of Boris Lyubimov (currently the acting president of the Mikhail Shchepkin Higher Theatre School) and the great-granddaughter of renowned actor Vasily Kachalov. Following an unhappy enrollment at an Orthodox high school which she would later compare to an al-Qaeda training camp, Lyubimova graduated from Moscow State University with a degree in journalism and from the Russian Institute of Theater Arts where she studied theater.

== Career ==
Since the 2000s she has worked often in television, working on shows including Vzglyad, Orthodox, and Orthodox Calendar. She has been head of Channel One's directorate of social and journalistic programs since 2016.

Her appointment as Minister of Culture was controversial due to past LiveJournal posts by Lyubimova wherein she said she "can't stand going to exhibitions, museums, opera" and explained that "I've been to the British Museum, National Gallery and a few dozen more European and Russian museums and reckon I wasted my time there". However, she received support from film critic Anton Dolin, who said "she loves culture, or at least, cinema".

On 6 May 2020, Olga Lyubimova's Press Secretary announced that she had contracted the COVID-19, but the disease is mild, so hospitalization is not required. Since the disease was mild, on 14 May Lyubimova recovered and returned to the exercise of her powers.

On 17 July 2023, Lyubimova was sanctioned by the United Kingdom for "using her position to support the Russian state's damaging anti-Ukrainian policies".
