= Panfilov's 28 Men =

- Theatrical release poster
- 28 панфиловцев
- Directed by: Kim Druzhinin; Andrey Shalopa
- Screenplay by: Andrey Shalopa
- Produced by: Anton Yudintsev; Andrey Shalopa
- Starring: Aleksandr Ustyugov; Yakov Kucherevskiy; Azamat Nigmanov; Oleg Fyodorov; Aleksey Morozov
- Cinematography: Nikita Rozhdestvenskiy
- Music by: Mikhail Kostylev
- Production companies: Panfilov's Twenty Eight; Gaijin Entertainment
- Distributed by: Universal Pictures International (UPI)
- Release date: November 24, 2016 (Russia)
- Running time: 105 minutes
- Country: Russia
- Languages: Russian; German
- Budget: $1,700,000
- Box office: $6,346,968 (January 2017) ₽385 million CIS ₽366.6 million rubles (Russia) ₸61.3 million tenge (Kazakhstan)

Panfilov's 28 Men (Russian: 28 панфиловцев, translit. 28 panfilovtsev) is a 2016 WWII film based on a legend about a group of soldiers – Panfilov's Twenty-Eight Guardsmen – heroically halting and destroying German tanks headed for Moscow. It is set in the Eastern Front of World War II and covers the 8th Guards Rifle Division operations during the 1941 Battle of Moscow. On DVD, it is also known as Battle for Moscow or Thunder of War in North American distribution. The legend on which the movie is based is wartime fiction, but the film presents it as fact.

The film is directed by Kim Druzhinin and Andrey Shalopa, produced by Panfilov's Twenty Eight and Gaijin Entertainment. Initially the film used crowdfunding; later, it was financially supported by the governments of Russia and Kazakhstan, as well as video game developers Gaijin Entertainment. The premiere took place in Volokolamsk on 16 November 2016 and in Russia on 24 November 2016.

The screenplay was written by Andrey Shalopa in 2009, and the production team took their teaser trailer of the film to Boomstarter crowdfunding platform, seeking co-financiers. The crowdfunding campaign was successful, and the film raised 3 million rubles out of planned 300 thousands. By the time of the premiere the film raised 34.7 million rubles.

In May 2014 Gaijin Entertainment, Russian game development company known for its game War Thunder joined the funding. In December 2014 the film won a grant of 30 million rubles from Russian Ministry of Culture, and later the Ministry of Culture and Sport of Kazakhstan added another $287 thousand.

Collecting money, producing and renting the film accompanied a vigorous discussion of its historical authenticity in the blogosphere and the media. The picture was positively received, having collected in the CIS 384 million rubles and becoming the best film of the year according to the results of the VTsIOM poll.

== Plot ==
USSR, late November 1941. Based on the account by reporter Vasiliy Koroteev that appeared in the Red Army's newspaper, Krasnaya Zvezda, shortly after the Battle of Moscow, this is the story of Panfilov's Twenty-Eight, a group of twenty-eight soldiers of the Red Army's 316th Rifle Division, under the command of General Ivan Panfilov, that stopped the advance on Moscow of a column of fifty-four German tanks and hundreds of infantry who guarded tanks' flanks of the 11th Panzer Division for several days. Though armed only with standard issue Mosin-Nagant infantry rifles and DP and PM-M1910 machine guns, all useless against tanks, and with RPG-40 anti-tank grenades and PTRD-41 anti-tank rifles, they fought tirelessly and defiantly, with uncommon bravery and unwavering dedication, to protect Moscow and their Motherland.

== Cast ==
Actors	Role
Yakov Kucherevskiy (image)	Ivan Dobrobabin, Sergeant
Aleksey Morozov (image)	Vasiliy Klochkov, Political instructor
Sergey Agafonov (image)	Grigoriy Bezrodnyh, Red Army
Aleksandr Ustyugov (image)	Ivan Moskalenko, Red Army
Oleg Fyodorov (image)	Grigoriy Shemyakin, Red Army
Andrey Nekrasov	Illarion Vasiljev, Red Army
Nikolai Klyamchuk	Grigoriy Petrenko, Red Army
Mikhail Pshenko (image)	Pyotr Dutov, Red Army
Dmitriy Murashev (image)	Grigoriy Konkin, Red Army
Anton Paderin (image)	Pyoter Emtsov, Red Army
Dmitriy Girev (image)	Yakov Bondarenko, Red Army
Vitaliy Kovalenko (image)	Ivan Shepetkov, Red Army
Anton Filipenko	Nikolay Trofimov, Red Army
Amadu Mamadakov (image)	Alikbay Kosaev, Red Army
Azamat Nigmanov (image)	Musabek Sengirbaev, Red Army
Aleksandr Plaksin	Abram Kryuchkov, Red Army
Maksim Belborodov (image)	Dmitriy Kaleynikov, Red Army
Oleg Senchenko	Gabriil Mitin, Red Army
Pavel Goncharov (image)	Ivan Natarov, Red Army

Actors	Role
Ivan Efremov	Nikita Mitchenko, Red Army
Nikolai Ivanov	Nikolay Belashev, Red Army
Vladimir Zaharenko	Nikolay Maksimov, Red Army
Dmitriy Tsutskin	Nikolay Ananjev, Red Army
Andrey Bodrenkov (image)	Ivan Shadrin, Red Army
Askar Tleugobilov (image)	Duishenkul Shopokov, Red Army
di. Kim Druzhinin	Daniil Kozhebergenov, Red Army
Mark Ovchinnikov	Dmitriy Timofeev
Aleksey Longin	Pavel Gundilovich, captain, company commander
Anton Kuznetsov (image)	Y.M.Reshetnikov, major, commander of battalion
di. Andrey Shalopa (image)	Vasiliy Ugryumov, Lieutenant
Dmitriy Sutyrin	Pyotr Ignatyev, senior lieutenant
Ivan Batarev	artillery commander
Nikita Ostrikov	signalman in headquarters
Aleksey Kashnikov	signaller
Kirill Kuznetsov	observer of the KP battalion
Lidiya Milyuzina	girl
Maksim Abrosimov	Panfilov's
Stanislav Lyamtsev	

== Production ==
Due to the peculiarities of the crowd-funded budget, the casting took a long time. The first confirmed actor was Yakov Kucherevskiy, who played Sergeant Dobrobabin - he agreed to star two years before filming. The most recent confirmed Aleksey Morozov for the role of political instructor Klochkov one day before the start of the shooting period. Panfilov's division was formed in the Kazakh SSR, the company included many Kazakhs, so many actors of Asian appearance were required in the crowd - Shalope's team turned to the national diasporas of Moscow, St. Petersburg and Ivanovo. In general, the team consisted of 360 participants, and in total the project involved up to 700 people.

== Filming ==
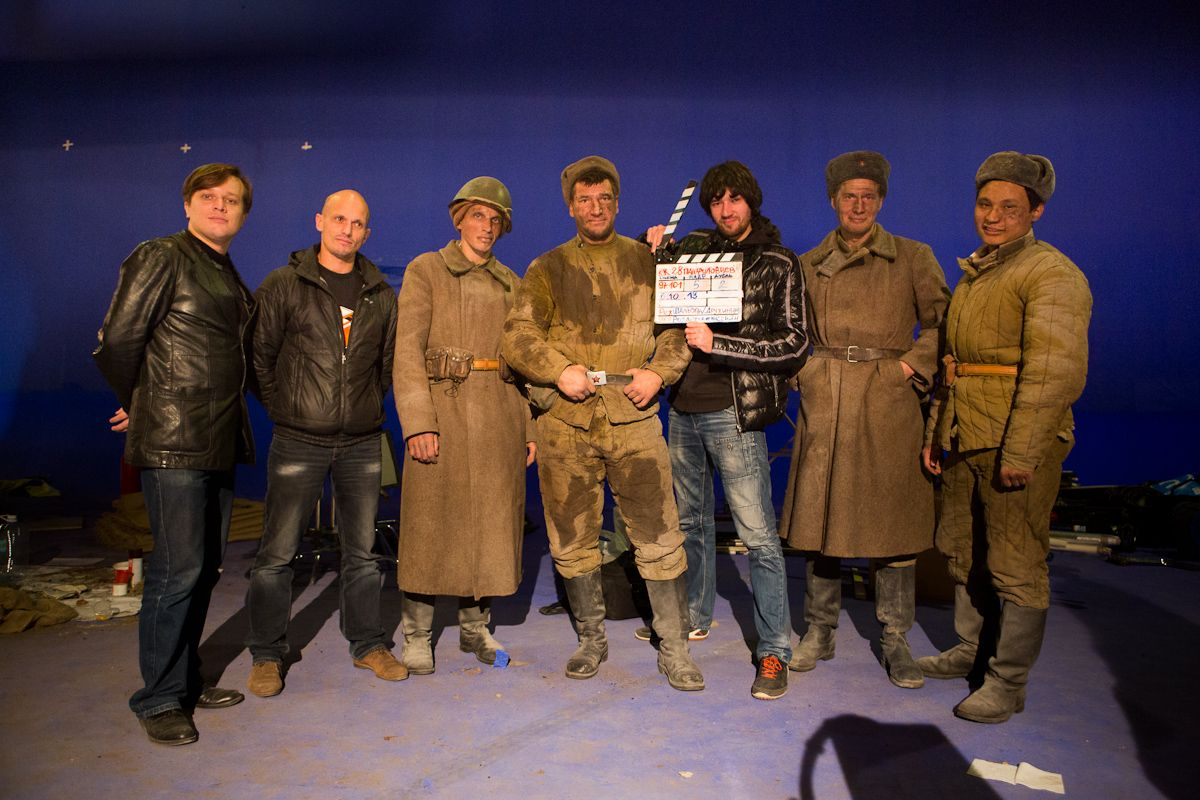
Actors and members of the crew of the film, in November 2013

In the process of filming, the picture operators used the following documents: storyboard, director's script, operator's table and tank battle scheme. The battle scheme contained the exact location of the tanks and the camera at different times, and the operator's table described what technique to use in what scenes. Such careful preparation allowed the team to work in winter conditions and with a short daylight.

The directors wanted to use a minimum of 3D animation and take as many effects as possible on the camera. The first experiments they conducted, moving primitive toy tanks the size of a matchbox on the sheets with the help of ropes. These experiments have shown that using reduced models of tanks will create the right level of realism.

As a contractor for the creation of special effects, Scandinava studio, previously specializing in commercials and having no experience with large films, was chosen. Specialists from Scandinava performed experiments on high-speed shooting and interested Druzhinin and Shalopu with his clip "Oil", in which a column of combustible liquid was rotating and ignited without the use of 3D animation. To work on the film, the studio expanded the staff from six to 28 people.

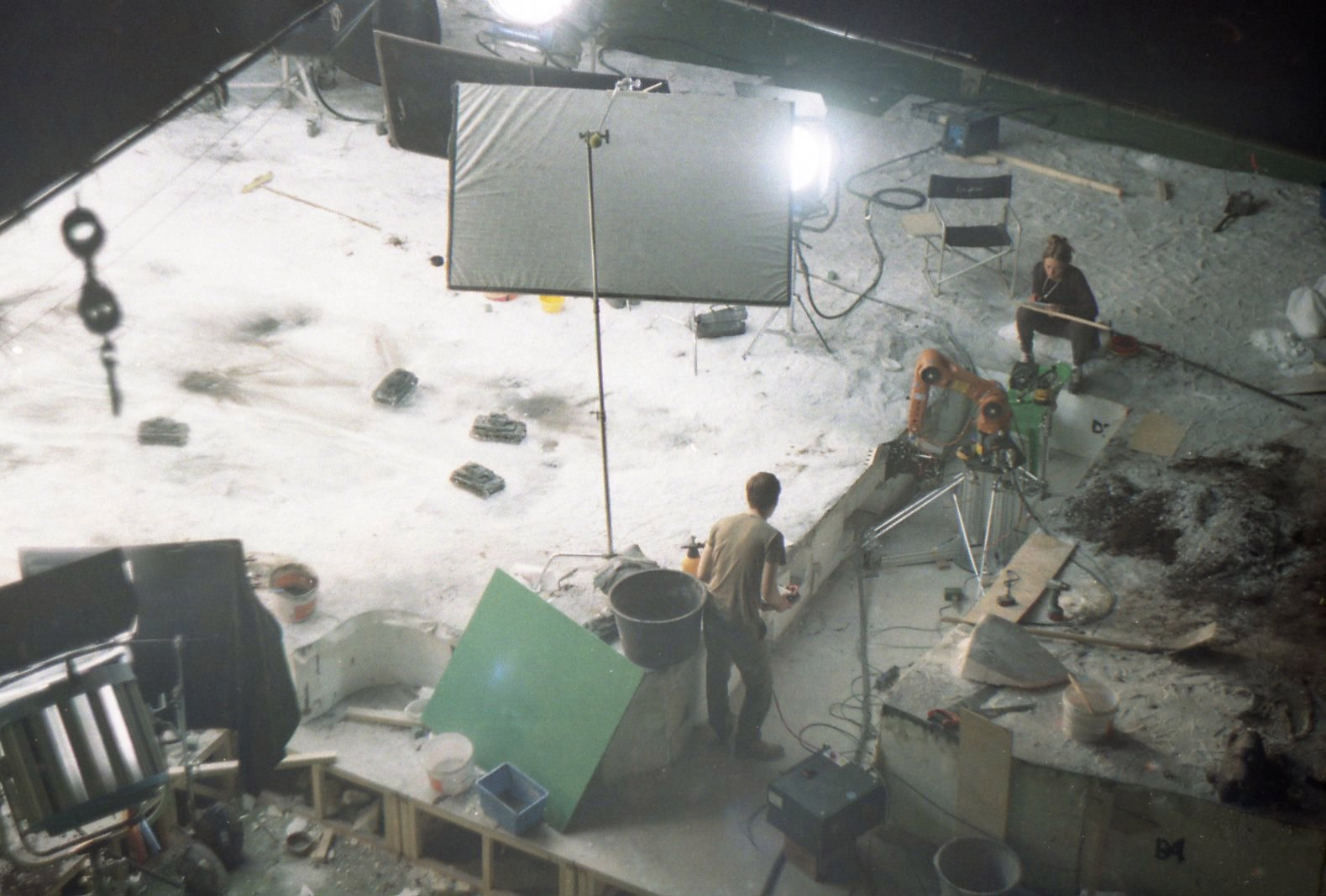
Pavilion "Lenfilm"

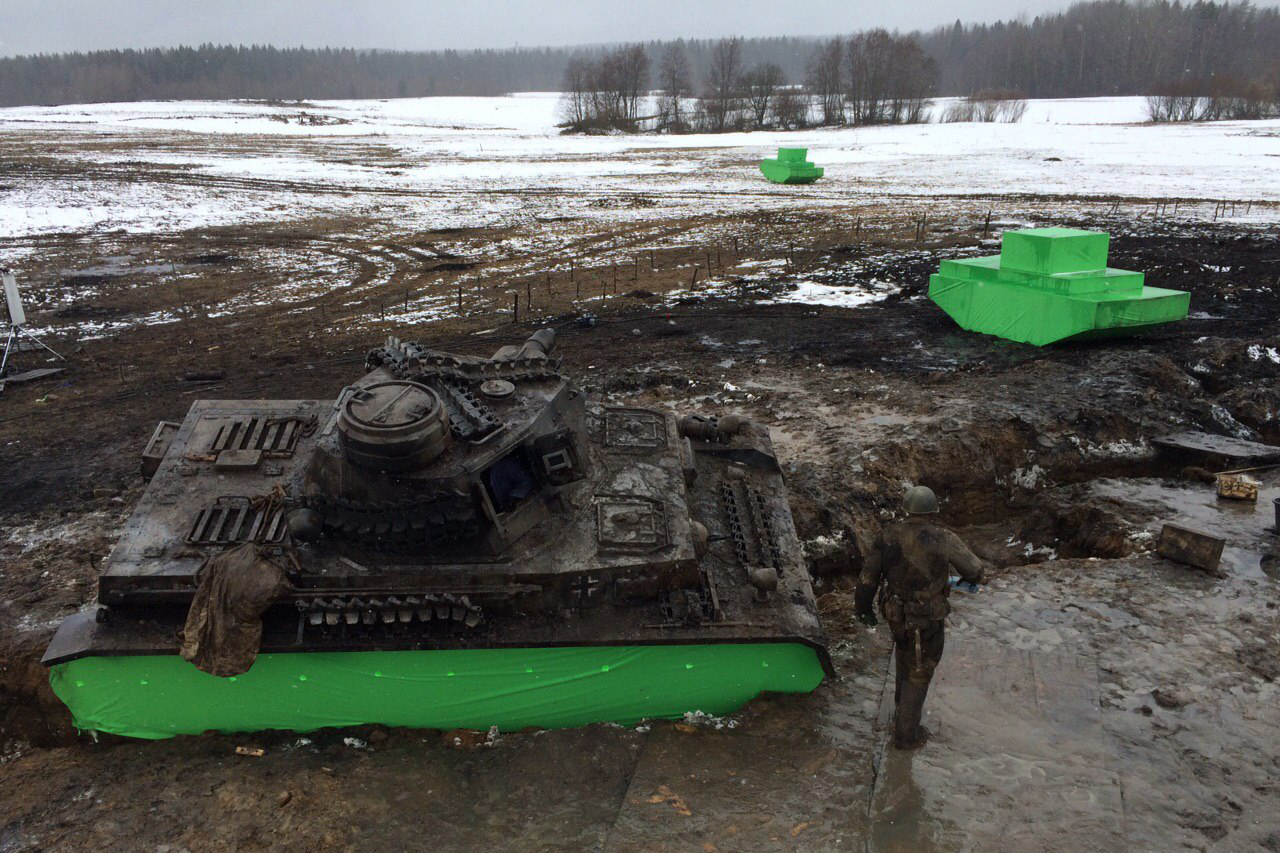
Full-scale shooting models 1: 1

To create personnel with tanks, studio specialists used the old technology of combined shooting-special effect. On the field, full-size wooden models of tanks, covered with green cloth, were used in the field, which the workers moved around the field on a sleigh. Then the surveyors made measurements of the landscape, and Scandinava recreated the battlefield at a scale of 1:16 in the studio and photographed all the scenes with detailed models of tanks, reduced by 16 times. To create a winter atmosphere in the film (snow, blizzard, the sky changing in the film's drama), the consequences of the attacks (smoke, ash), and to amplify gun shots and some explosions, Scandinava decided not to use the traditional approach using CGI (Computer-generated imagery, The letters "computer-generated images"), instead taking real natural effects on the camera. Shooting on the nature, tanks and natural effects were collected by layers on the computer in one single image.

This approach required a certain technique of filming. In order to move the toy tank were like moving the present, it was necessary to shoot it four times faster, and then slow down the received frames. The camera, accordingly, had to be moved four times faster than on the field, which can not be done with hands. Therefore, in the pavilion shootings for camera control, the operators used the robotic arm KUKA Agilus, provided and programmed with the help of specialists from the Research Research Institute of Robotics. For close-up shots, a full-size mock-up of the PzKpfw IV tank was built, the cabin of which was recreated on Lenfilm as a separate capsule on the springs, which made it possible to achieve realistic pitching during shooting. Currently, the layout is kept in the Museum of the Karelian isthmus in the Vyborg.

The whole film was shot on the camera Arri Alexa (English) Russian, except for tanks, where because of the size required the apparatus of the company Red. Optometry used a spherical lens Illumina of the St. Petersburg plant "LOMO" - according to the operator, this solution allowed to smooth out the effect of the "excessively high-quality" image, which is inherent in all modern cameras.

=== Music ===
Description of the process of writing the music for the film.

Sound for the film was recorded and reduced to the technical base of the studio "Nevafilm". Mikhail Kostylev, famous for his soundtracks for computer games, took up writing music for the film. According to the composer, he sought to convey a sense of pride in the Victory and the feat, creating an epic musical background in which the drama would remain. The leitmotif of most compositions is the theme "Eternal Flame", which Kostylev wrote at an early stage of the production of the film. The soundtrack was recorded after the presentation of the video, with the first score for all instruments was recorded using a MIDI editor. This allowed the director to immediately appreciate the approximate sound of the music, its mood and tempo. Then, using a metronome, individual instrument parts, vocals, chorus and parts were recorded, in which a whole orchestra was involved.

Choral parts are performed by vocalists of the Moscow Synodal Choir under the direction of the Honored Artist of Russia Aleksei Puzankov, instrumental musicians of the ensemble of soloists of the Academic Symphony Orchestra of the Philharmonic.

== Reception ==
=== Government support ===
Apart from its crowdfunding budget, Panfilov's 28 Men was produced with backing from the culture ministries of Russia and Kazakhstan. Russian culture minister Vladimir Medinsky praised the planned release of the film, telling the upper chamber of Russia's parliament that the production reflected the country's interest in patriotic films. Referencing criticism over the historical accuracy of the Soviet legend that formed the basis of the movie, he stated that the story is "a sacred legend that shouldn't be interfered with. People that do that are filthy scum."

Russian state media showed president Vladimir Putin watching the film with Kazakh president Nursultan Nazarbayev.

=== Box office ===
Rent a film in Russia was held from November 24 to December 26, 2016. The volume of the total ticket office for the first weekend was 180,559,249 rubles. In its opening weekend, Panfilov's 28 Men was the second highest-grossing movie at the Russian and Belarus box office, behind the film Fantastic Beasts and Where to Find Them.

According to the report of the Cinema Foundation, at the 48th week (from 24 to 30 November), Russian cinemas were visited by 3.4 million spectators, of which every fourth spectator chose "28 panfilovtsev", and the fees amounted to 209.8 million rubles. The fund reports that the percentage of morning and afternoon shows was at evening level. That is, the film attracted a wide audience - and the adult viewer, and schoolchildren with students. In total, up to November 30, 36,616 sessions were held in Russia, which were attended by 878,944 spectators. The fees in Kazakhstan amounted to 61.3 million tenge.

On December 26, the film became available for purchase in online stores, and on January 27, 2017, it was released on DVD and Blu-ray. By mid-January, box office fees amounted to about 366.6 million rubles in Russia, and all in the CIS countries the film collected 385 million rubles.

=== Veracity ===
Post-war investigation by Soviet authorities, carried out in 1948 and since declassified, revealed the story to be a fabrication. Neither German nor Soviet operational documents confirmed the claimed German casualties, and the Germans fulfilled their day's objectives well before the end of the day. After one of the supposedly dead men was arrested on suspicion of collaboration with the enemy and confessed to having "voluntarily" surrendered to German troops and to having later joined a German police force, it was discovered that not all twenty-eight were killed — six of the soldiers had survived and were still alive. Another one of the Guardsmen was arrested by the NKVD for allegedly "giving himself up to the enemy" and sent into a penal battalion. The findings were kept secret; the Twenty-Eight Guardsmen remained national heroes.
