= Aleksey Morozov (actor) =

Russian actor

- Алексей Морозов
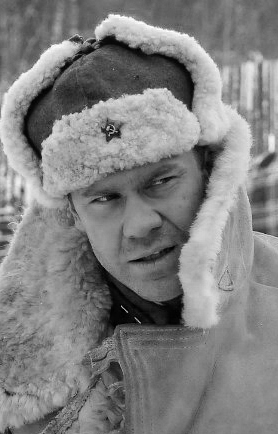
- Aleksey Morozov in the film Panfilov's 28 Men
- Born: Aleksey Valentinovich Morozov; 16 November 1979; Leningrad, RSFSR, USSR (now Saint Petersburg, Russia)
- Occupations: Actor; film director
- Years active: 2000–present

Aleksey Valentinovich Morozov (Russian: Алексей Валентинович Морозов; born 16 November 1979) is a Russian theatre actor and film director. He appeared in over 40 films.

== Biography ==
Aleksey Morozov was born on 16 November 1979. Since childhood, he was fascinated by acting. In the second grade, he played the main role in the television play The Journey of the Blue Arrow, at the age of 14 he was admitted to the theater studio Imagine at the St. Petersburg television. He studied to be an actor at the Russian State Institute of Performing Arts. In 2001 he was invited to join the troupe of the Maly Drama Theatre.

== Selected filmography ==
Year	Title	Role	Notes
2015	The Way Out	Tenor	
2016	Panfilov's 28 Men	political instructor Vasily Klochkov	
2017	The Age of Pioneers	Gherman Titov	
2018	The White Crow	Strizhevsky	
2020	Streltsov	Dobrovolski	
