= Ekaterina Genieva =

Russian librarian

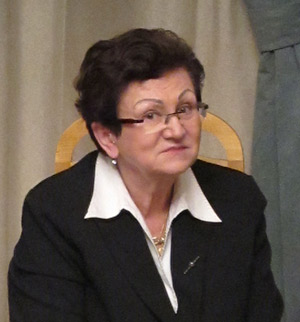
Ekaterina Genieva

Ekaterina Yurievna Genieva, OBE (Екатери́на Ю́рьевна Гéниева; April 1, 1946 – July 9, 2015) was a Russian librarian. She was director of the Margarita Rudomino All-Russia State Library for Foreign Literature from 1993 to 2015.

Genieva was born in Moscow. Her mother was a physician and she was raised by her grandmother. She studied English literature at Moscow State University and defended her dissertation in 1972 on James Joyce. It was the first dissertation in the Soviet Union on the author, who was widely banned in the country. She went on to write criticism and bibliographies of many authors, including Charles Dickens, Jane Austen, Virginia Woolf, and the Brontës.

She joined the Library for Foreign Literature in 1971 and spent the rest of her career there. The library held works in 140 languages and was a place where people could research subjects and authors that were otherwise banned or forbidden in Soviet Russia. She became deputy directory under Vyacheslav Ivanov in 1990.

During the 1991 Soviet coup d'état attempt, she allowed the Library's photocopiers (access to photocopiers were under close control in the Soviet Union) to be used to publish resistance newspapers. A government official investigated this and Genieva took responsibility. The official simply insisted that they draw the curtains to prevent the light of the photocopiers from being seen from the street.

Following the dissolution of the Soviet Union at the end of 1991, a British initiative called Book Aid which resulted in over one million books were donated to the country. Genieva coordinated the distribution of the books to libraries across the former Soviet Union. In response to concerns about what types of material to send, she said "Send it all! We've had enough of censorship!". Genieva also spearheaded efforts to identify and return over 40,000 books looted from European libraries by Soviet troops during World War II.

She was president of the Russian Open Society Foundation from 1995 to 2004, which helped establish Internet access, provide textbooks, and fund libraries throughout the country.

Among the many awards she received was the Order of the British Empire in 2007. She was also the first woman proposed for membership in the Athenaeum Club.

== Personal life ==
Genieva married engineer Yury Belenky and they had a daughter, Darya.

Genieva was a Russian Orthodox Christian. She was a supporter of Father Alexander Men and on the board of the Russian Bible Society.
