= Margarita Rudomino All-Russia State Library for Foreign Literature =

Library in Moscow, Russia

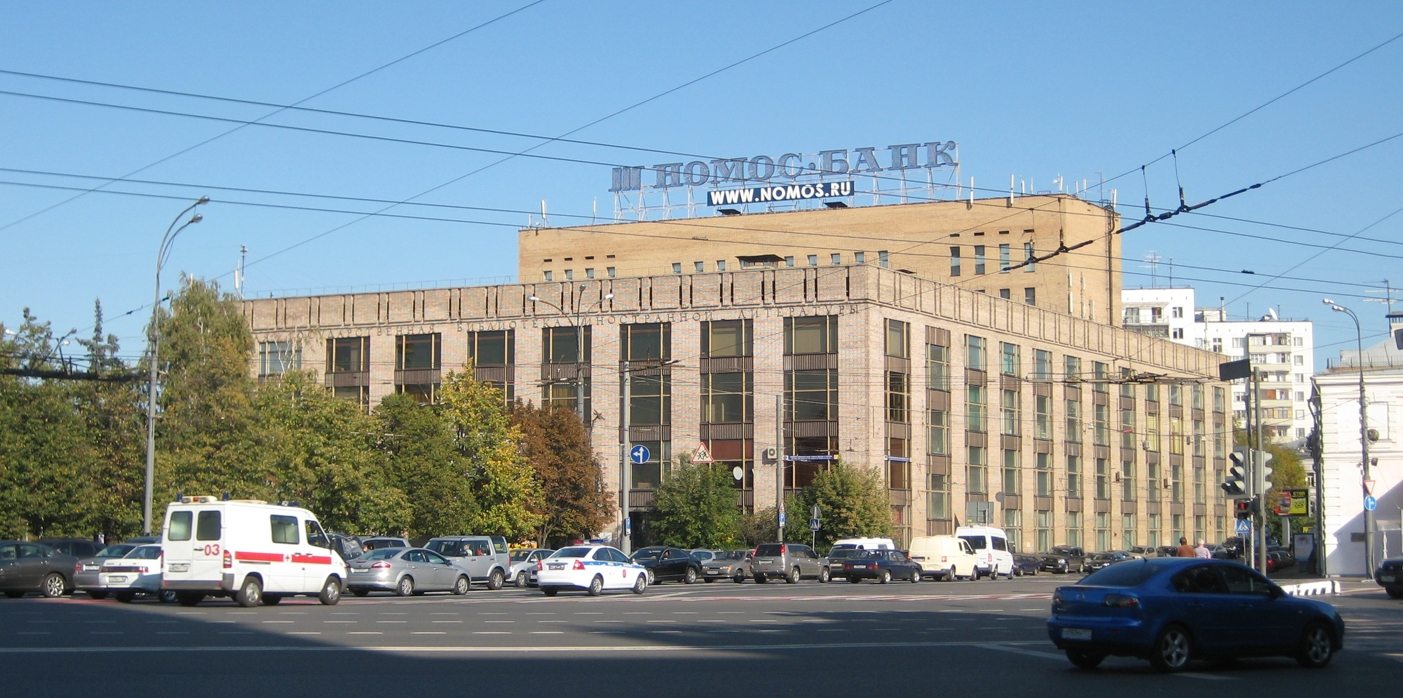
- Location: 109189, Russia, Moscow, Nikoloyamskaya ul., 1, tel. +7 (495) 915-36-21
- Established: 1921
- Branches: literature in foreign languages

Collection
- Size: about 4.4 million copies in more than 140 languages.

Other information
- Director: Vadim Duda
- Website: http://www.libfl.ru/

The Margarita Rudomino All-Russian State Library For Foreign Literature, historically known as the All-Union Library of Foreign Literature under the Soviet Union is a special library that focuses primarily on the acquisition of foreign literature and material, it is based in Moscow. It is also known by its nickname, "Foreigner" due to the nature of its collection. The library was founded by Margarita Ivanovna Rudomino.

== History ==
The library was founded by Margarita Ivanovna Rudomino in 1921 in an old building in central Moscow. It opened as a small Neophilological Library that started with a collection of only 100 books in German, French and English located on the 5th floor of the building. It was not the first special library in the Soviet Union preceded by the Fundamental Library of the Social Libraries in 1918 and the State Central Scientific Medical Library in 1919.

In 1948 the library was conferred by the U.S.S.R Council of Ministers the status of an "All Union Central Library".

The library has held approximately 250 lectures and meetings and 200 exhibitions annually.

The library moved four times and did not have its current home until 1967. The library was still under the control of its founder and it grew to contain four million books. Most of the books are from Western countries and the library contains languages facilities so that readers can learn the language of the books. The books are catalogued according to the system used in the culture that the books come from. The library’s founder studied library science in Denmark. She retired in 1973 by which time the library had four million publications in 128 languages. Since 1975, the profile of the library has included fiction, foreign literature on the Humanities, arts, foreign countries and reference publications.

The main library building is located in Moscow at the Yauza Bank, opposite the high-rise building on Kotelnicheskaya embankment.

Unlike other Central Moscow scientific libraries, the library is intended for readers from sixteen years old. For younger readers (from 5 to 16 years), there is a children's room.

Nicknamed "the Foreigner", the library has an extensive stock of humanities literature. Compared to Moscow's other main libraries, such as the Russian State Library and the State Public Historical Library of Russia, the library offers relative quick access to books from its depository, just 15–20 minutes. It is said that it is one of the world's most important libraries.

== Directors ==
- 1922–1973: Margarita Ivanovna Rudomino
- 1973–1990: Lyudmyla Kosygina
- 1990–1993: Vyacheslav Vsevolodovich Ivanov
- 1993–2015: Ekaterina Yurievna Genieva
- 2015–2018: Vadim Valerevich Duda
- 2019–Present: Mikhail Shepel

== See also ==
- List of libraries in Russia
