= Ministry of Culture (Russia) =

Government department of Russia

Ministry of Culture of the Russian Federation
- Министерство культуры Российской Федерации; Ministerstvo kultury Rossiiskoi Federatsii
- Ministry Emblem

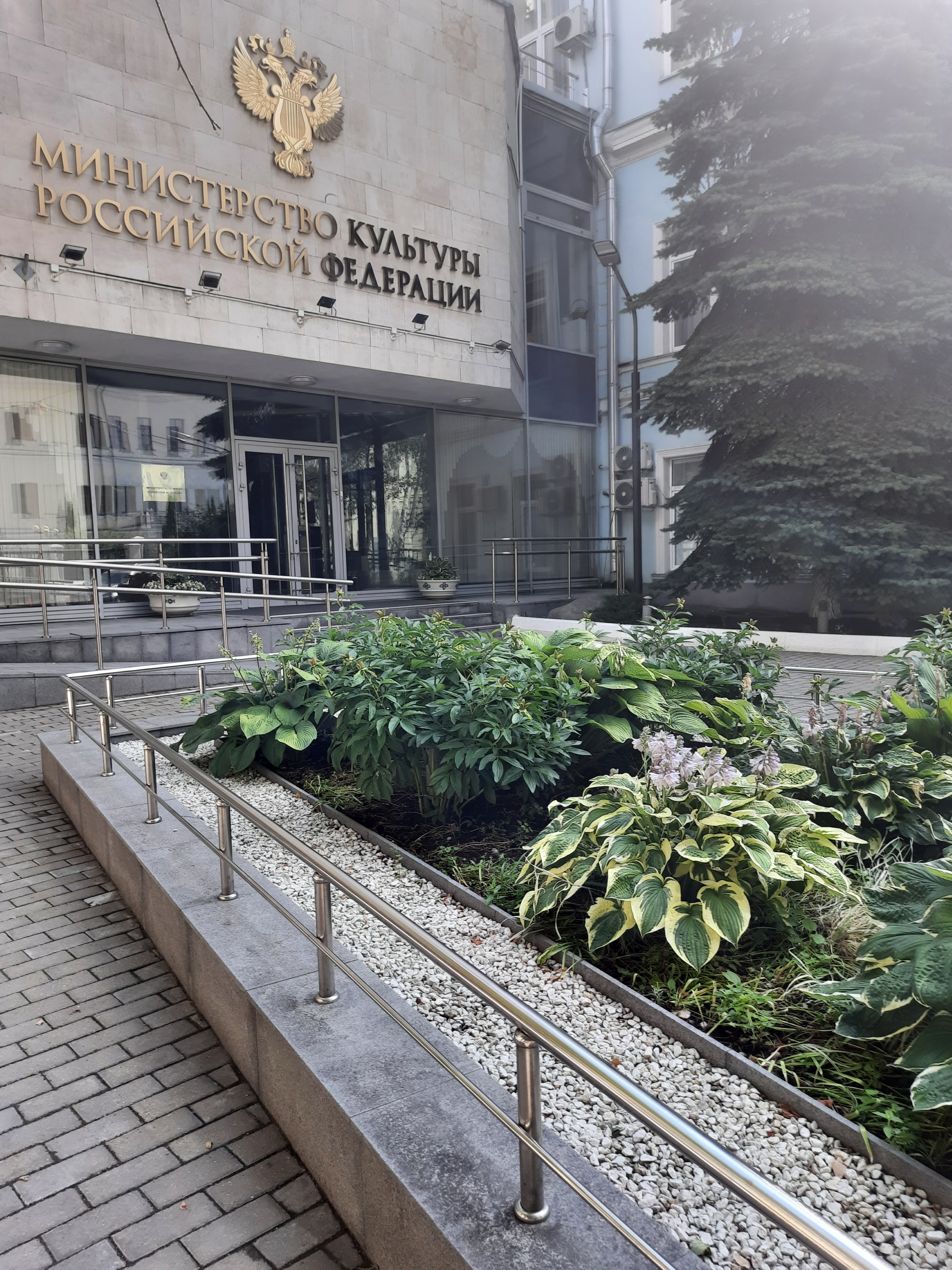

Agency overview
- Formed: 2 May 2008
- Jurisdiction: Government of Russia
- Headquarters: Maly Gnezdnikovsky 6/7, Moscow; 55°45′44.46″N 37°36′19.53″E
- Annual budget: 74.5 billion rouble (FY 2011)
- Minister responsible: Olga Lyubimova, Minister of Culture
- Website: culture.gov.ru (in Russian)

The Ministry of Culture of the Russian Federation (Russian: Министерство культуры Российской Федерации; Минкультуры России, romanized: Ministerstvo kultury Rossiiskoi Federatsii) is a ministry of the Government of Russia responsible for state policy in cultural spheres such as art, cinematography, archives, copyright, cultural heritage, and censorship.

== Structure ==
The Ministry of Culture of the Russian Federation was established in its current form in 2008, the successor to the Ministry of Culture and Mass Communication. The ministry is responsible for developing and overseeing the cultural policies of the Russian government. Its jurisdiction includes all cultural institutions and activities within Russia, such as arts, cinematography, archives, copyright, cultural heritage, and certain aspects of censorship.

Olga Lyubimova has served as the Minister of Culture since January 21, 2020.

== Authority ==
The Ministry of Culture independently carries out legal regulations, as well as develops and introduces draft regulations on the following issues: culture, art, cinematography, copyright, related rights, historical and cultural heritage, international cultural and informational cooperation.

== History ==
The current Ministry of Culture was formed on May 2, 2008, from the Ministry for Culture and Mass Media (Министерство культуры и массовых коммуникаций Российской Федерации). In the past, the Ministry of Culture operated between 1953 and 2004, while between March and September 1992 the ministry was known as the Ministry for Culture and Tourism (Министерство культуры и туризма Российской Федерации).

The Federal Service for Supervision over Cultural Heritage Protection (Russian: Федеральная служба по надзору за соблюдением законодательства в области охраны культурного наследия; Росохранкультура) was dissolved in 2011.

== Ministers of Culture ==
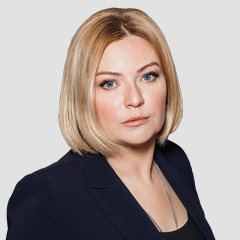
Olga Lyubimova

Recent previous ministers of culture have included Mikhail Shvydkoy (2000–2004) and Vladimir Medinsky (2012–2020).
