= Khanuma =

1978 Soviet television film

- Written by: Yury Aksyonov; Vladimir Konstantinov; Boris Ratser
- Directed by: Georgy Tovstonogov
- Starring: Lyudmila Makarova; Valentina Kovel; Vladislav Strzhelchik
- Music by: Giya Kancheli
- Country of origin: Soviet Union
- Original language: Russian

Production
- Producer: Leonid Svetlov
- Cinematography: Dmitry Dolinin
- Editor: Lyudmila Obrazumova
- Running time: 147 minutes
- Production company: Lenfilm

Original release
- Release: 1978

Khanuma (Russian: Ханума ['xanuma], Georgian: ხანუმა) is a shrewd matchmaker in the eponymous 1978 Soviet Russian Georgian-themed television film directed by Georgy Tovstonogov. It is a screen version of the same name classic Georgian vaudeville by Avksenty Tsagareli.

The text of Tsagareli's play was updated by Boris Ratser and Vladimir Konstantinov. This work is considered one of the best works of Tovstonogov.

== Plot ==
The film takes place at the end of the 19th century in Tiflis, Georgia, where two matchmakers; Khanuma and Kabato, compete.

The Old Prince Vano Pantiashvili, a drunk, who misses everything possible, is looking for a rich bride to pay debts and buy back the pledged property. Khanuma found him too old and ugly for a bride with a decent dowry. Guliko, the prince knows the bride only by descriptions of Khanuma (and her age in these descriptions gradually increases), but he is mainly interested in a dowry.

A wealthy Tiflis merchant dreams of giving his daughter, Sona to marry a ruined prince in order to obtain a noble title. Meanwhile, Sona is in despair. She is in love with her music and French teacher and does not want to marry an elderly prince.

== Cast ==
- Lyudmila Makarova as Khanuma
- Valentina Kovel as Kabato
- Vladislav Strzhelchik as Prince Vano Pantiashvili
- Gennadi Bogachyov as Kote, Vano's nephew
- Vadim Medvedev as Kotryants, rich merchant
- Nikolay Trofimov as Akop
- Boris Leskin as prince's friend
- Leonid Nevedomsky as Kinto

== History ==
Taking as a basis the classical vaudeville, Tovstonogov reworked it: the text was updated by the popular comediographers Boris Racer and Vladimir Konstantinov. There were no poems by Grigol Orbeliani in the original version, which Tovstonogov himself reads in the play. Recreation of the Georgian color was entrusted to the artist Joseph Sumbatashvili, who created an excellent scenery of the old Georgian city, and composer Giya Kancheli.

The play premiered on December 30, 1972. Immediately became one of the most popular stagings of Leningrad Bolshoi Drama Theater, withstood more than 300 performances.

== See also ==
- Keto and Kote (film)
