= Street of the Younger Son =

- Russian: Улица младшего сына
- Directed by: Lev Golub
- Starring: Boris Bityukov; Zhenya Bondarenko; Valentin Chernyak; Zinaida Dekhtyaryova; Evgeniy Grigorev
- Cinematography: Izrail Pikman
- Music by: Yuri Belzatsky; Vladimir Olovnikov
- Release date: 1962
- Running time: 98 minute
- Country: Soviet Union
- Language: Russian

Street of the Younger Son (Russian: Улица младшего сына) is a 1962 Soviet drama film directed by Lev Golub based on the novel with the same name by Lev Kassil and Max Polyanovsky about Soviet partisan Volodia Dubinin.

== Plot ==
The film tells about a boy named Volodya from Kerch, who is fond of literature about Chkalov, constructs the best gliders, goes fishing with his father and becomes a partisan when the war begins.

== Cast ==
- Boris Bityukov
- Zhenya Bondarenko as Vanya
- Valentin Chernyak
- Zinaida Dekhtyaryova
- Evgeniy Grigorev as Lankin, podpolshchik
- Boris Kordunov
- Sasha Kornev as Volodya Dubinin
- Tanya Kresik as Svetlana
- Pavel Pekur
- Ivan Shatillo
- Tamara Muzhenko as Commander Lazarev's wife
