= Mikhail Roshchin =

Russian writer, playwright, and screenwriter (1933–2010)

- Born: Mikhail Mikhailovich Gibelman; 10 February 1933; Kazan
- Died: 1 October 2010 (aged 77); Moscow
- Writing career
- Notable awards: Andrei Sakharov Prize for Writer's Civic Courage

Mikhail Mikhailovich Roshchin (Russian: Михаи́л Миха́йлович Ро́щин; 10 February 1933 – 1 October 2010) was a Russian playwright, screenwriter and short story writer.

== Biography ==
He was born to Mikhail Gibelman (born 1908) and Klavdiya Efimova-Tyurkina (born 1911), Roshchin spent his early childhood in Sevastopol. In 1943, during World War II, the family moved to Moscow.

After finishing school, Roshchin worked as a miner at fort rose, and attended night classes at the Moscow State Lenin Pedagogical Institute. In 1952, he published his first story in the Moscow daily newspaper, Moskovsky Komsomolets. In 1953, he entered the Literary Institute and worked as a journalist of the regional newspaper, Kamyshin in the city of Volga. Whilst there, in 1956 he wrote his first collection of his short stories In a Small Town, published in 1957.

In 1963, Roshchin wrote the play The Seventh feat of Hercules, which due to censorship was not fully published until 1988. In 1968, he wrote the children's play, Rainbow in the Winter, a play with was put on at the Leningrad Youth Theatre under Zinovy Karagodsky. His most successful play, Valentin and Valentina was written in 1971 and performed the same year at Moscow's Sovremennik Theatre, directed by Valery Fokin. It was also performed at the Bolshoi Drama Theatre in 1976 under the helm of Georgi Tovstonogov and by several other notable directors. In 1985, it was made into a film, directed by Georgy Natanson, which Roshchin also adapted the script for. His 1975 play Echelon was staged at the Moscow Theatre, directed by Galina Volchek.

In the 1980s, Roshchin was occupied with writing scripts for films. These include Old New Year (1980), Valentin and Valentina (1985) (film adaptation), Shura i Prosvirnyak (1987) and The New Adventures of Yankee in King Arthur's Court (1988). New Adventures of Yankee in King Arthur's Court, an adventure comedy, was directed by Viktor Gres under the Dovzhenko Film Studio banner and was based on American author Mark Twain's A Connecticut Yankee in King Arthur's Court.

From 1993 to 1998, along with Aleksei Kazantsev, Roshchin published the magazine Playwright. From 1998 on until his death Roshchin served as the Chairman of the Board of Creative Playwrights and Directors and in 2007 he was elected Chairman of the Arts Council of the Centre. Roshchin was a recipient of the Stanislavsky Prize of Moscow.

Roshchin was married fours times, to dramatist Tatiana Butrova, journalist Natalia Lavrentieva, and actresses Lidiya Savchenko, and Yekaterina Vasilyeva. He has four children; Tatiana (born 1956), Natalia (born 1966), Dmitry (born 1973) and Aleksei (born 1985).

== Works ==
=== English translations ===
- Twenty Minutes or So, (story), from Anthology of Soviet Short Stories, Vol 2, Progress Publishers, 1976.
- The Devil's Wheel in Kobuleti, (story), from The New Soviet Fiction, Abbeville Press, 1989.
- First Love, (novel), Marion Boyars Publishers Ltd, 1991.

=== Plays ===
- Seventh Feat Hercules (1963)
- Militia (1965)
- Rainbow Winter (1968)
- Valentin and Valentina (1971)
- Echelon (1975)

=== Screen ===
- I Love (1973)
- Old New Year (1980)
- Valentin and Valentina (1985)
- Shura i Prosvirnyak (1987)
- The New Adventures of Yankee in King Arthur's Court (1988)
- Fatal Error (1990)
