= Once More About Love =

- Russian: Ещё раз про любовь
- Directed by: Georgy Natanson
- Written by: Edvard Radzinsky
- Produced by: Yuri Galkovsky
- Starring: Tatyana Doronina; Alexander Lazarev; Oleg Yefremov
- Cinematography: Vladimir Nikolayev
- Edited by: Klavdiya Moskvina
- Music by: Aleksandr Flyarkovsky
- Production company: Mosfilm
- Release date: May 21, 1968
- Running time: 92 min.
- Country: Soviet Union
- Language: Russian

Once More About Love (Russian: Ещё раз про любовь, romanized: Eshchyo raz pro lyubov) is a 1968 Soviet romantic drama film directed by Georgy Natanson.

The film tells the story of a flight attendant's love for a brilliant but aloof physicist which transforms both their lives, but just as he realizes the depth of his feelings, her heroic sacrifice leaves him to face the world without her.

== Plot ==
Flight attendant Natasha (Tatiana Doronina) first notices physicist Evdokimov (Alexander Lazarev) during a lecture at the Polytechnic Museum, where she is accompanied by her longtime friend Felix (Alexander Shirvindt). She is captivated by the confident young speaker, but her relationship with Felix soon falters. Later, while at a café before another flight, she unexpectedly encounters Evdokimov again, and they strike up a conversation. Evdokimov, an intellectual used to admiration and somewhat arrogant, is both intrigued and charmed by Natasha's presence. "You are the best girl in the USSR," he declares playfully, realizing her interest in him.

After their second meeting, they spend the night together, during which Natasha confesses her love for him. Evdokimov reacts with cold detachment, failing to grasp the sincerity and vulnerability behind her words. The next morning, he casually arranges another meeting, only to find a note after her departure: "We won’t meet again." However, both of them show up later that day at the agreed location, marking the start of a complicated romance. Despite their differences in temperament and interests, Natasha's deep affection for Evdokimov prevails, and over time, he discovers his own growing feelings for her. As his scientific experiment approaches its most dangerous phase, Evdokimov departs on a work trip while Natasha continues her usual flight routes. When Evdokimov achieves a groundbreaking discovery, he eagerly anticipates sharing the news with Natasha. For the first time, he brings flowers to their meeting, only to learn that Natasha has died heroically in a plane fire while saving passengers.

== Cast ==
- Tatyana Doronina as Natasha Aleksandrova
- Alexander Lazarev as Elektron Yevdokimov
- Oleg Yefremov as Lev Kartsev
- Yelena Korolyova as Ira
- Aleksandr Shirvindt as Feliks Toptygin
- Vladimir Komratov as Vladik
- Sergey Chistyakov as Yevgeny Dal
- Yevgeny Karelskikh as restaurant host
- Nikolay Merzlikin as young man at night stop
- Zhanna Vladimirskaya as Maya
- Zinovy Vysokovsky as Pyotr Galperin

== Reaction ==
Natanson's film takes 135th place in the list of the highest grossing Soviet films with 36.7 million viewers.

=== Critical response ===
Film critic Vsevolod Revich noted in his review:

This is a film about people who can and are able to deeply and strongly experience, and therefore, about happy people: despite the fact that there are tears, an unrequited feeling, and tragedy in it.
