= Oleg Basilashvili =

Soviet and Russian actor (born 1934)

- Олег Басилашвили
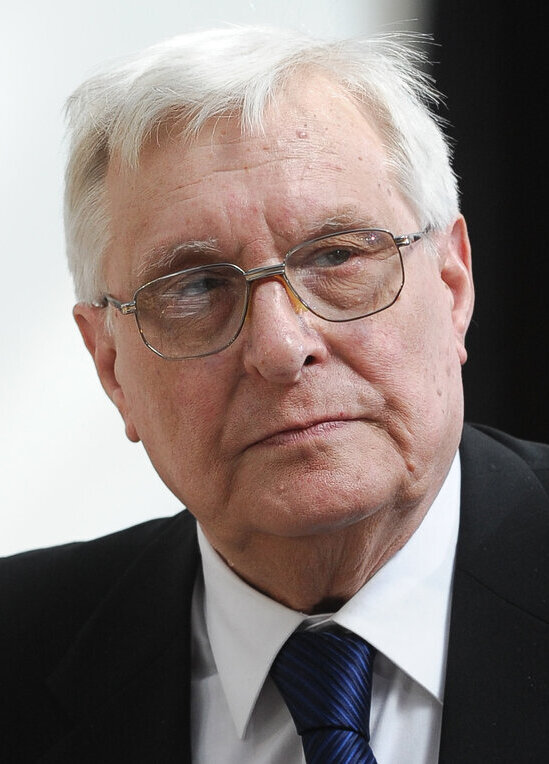
- Basilashvili in 2016
- Born: 26 September 1934 (age 91); Moscow, Russian SFSR, Soviet Union
- Occupations: Actor, public figure
- Years active: 1954–present
- Spouse: Galina Evgenievna Mshanskaya

Oleg Valerianovich Basilashvili (Note: Russian: Олег Валерианович Басилашвили, romanized: Oleg Valerianovich Basilashvili; Georgian: ოლეგ ვალერიანის ძე ბასილაშვილი, romanized: Oleg Valerianis dze Basilashvili, pronounced [oleɡ basilaʃʷili]) (born 26 September 1934) is a Soviet and Russian stage and film actor. He was awarded People's Artist of the USSR in 1984.

== Biography ==
=== Childhood ===
He was born to a family of mixed Russian, Polish, and Georgian origin. He is half Russian.

Oleg Valerianovich Basilashvili was born on 26 September 1934 in Moscow, Russian SFSR, Soviet Union. His father, named Valerian Basilashvili, was a director of the Moscow Polytechnical College. His mother, named Irina Ilyinskaya, was a teacher of linguistics.

His father made up a humorous story that his grandfather had once arrested a dangerous criminal named Dzhugashvili, who was really Joseph Stalin. In reality Basilashvili's maternal grandfather was a Russian Orthodox priest and an architect, who participated in the construction of the Cathedral of Christ the Saviour in Moscow. During World War II, young Oleg Basilashvili was evacuated from Moscow to the Transcaucasian Republic of Georgia. There, he went to a primary school and lived with his paternal grandfather until the end of World War II.

=== Acting career ===
In 1956, Oleg Basilashvili graduated from the Acting School of the Moscow Art Theatre, where he had studied under Pavel Massalsky. His group had many actors who would achieve fame in the future: among his fellows were Yevgeny Yevstigneyev, Mikhail Kozakov and Tatiana Doronina, his first wife. Together with Doronina, Basilashvili joined the troupe at the Bolshoi Drama Theater (BDT) in Leningrad under the leadership of the legendary director Georgy Tovstonogov. Since 1959, Basilashvili has been a permanent member of the troupe at the BDT in St. Petersburg. There, his stage partners were such stars as Kirill Lavrov, Tatiana Doronina, Alisa Freindlich, Lyudmila Makarova, Svetlana Kryuchkova, Zinaida Sharko, Valentina Kovel, Innokenty Smoktunovsky, Oleg Borisov, Pavel Luspekayev, Sergei Yursky, and many other remarkable Russian actors. Basilashvili's most memorable stage works were in the play Uncle Vanya by Anton Chekhov, Kholstomer based on the eponymous story of Leo Tolstoy, The Lower Depths by Maxim Gorky, and other classic plays directed by Tovstonogov.

=== Film career ===
Oleg Basilashvili shot to fame with his roles in films by director Eldar Ryazanov. They collaborated in such popular films as Office Romance (1977), Station for Two (1982), Promised Heaven (1991), and Prediction (1993), which became significant box-office hits.

One of his most well-known film roles is the protagonist of Georgiy Daneliya's Autumn Marathon (1979). The film is a cross-genre comedy and melodrama with a bitter humor and satire of the Soviet life. Basilashvili plays a weak-willed man in his mid-life crisis, who is torn between two nice women, his wife and his mistress, and all three of them become entangled in the game of lies and personal demands, being at the same time strangled by the stagnant Soviet reality. The film became a Soviet classic, and premiered at the 1979 San Sebastián Film Festival.

In the 1980s, he appeared in eccentric films by Karen Shakhnazarov. Those were Kurer (Courier) (1987), Gorod Zero (Zero City) (1988), and Sny (Dreams) (1993). Dreams, a wild comedy about Perestroika, is especially remarkable: in it Basilashvili tried on several images, those of a noble count from the past, a pornographer and a rock star.

In 2001, Oleg Basilashvili starred in Karen Shakhnazarov's comedy Poisons or the World History of Poisoning (2001). The actor performed both as pensioner Prokhorov and the Pope Alexander VI Borgia in it.

Among the actor's other works of the early 21st century, one can mention the role of Prof. Fyodorov in the historical film The Romanovs: An Imperial Family (2000) and General Yepanchin in the TV series The Idiot (2003) directed by Vladimir Bortko after the famous novel by Fyodor Dostoevsky.

=== Political career ===
During the 1990s, he was a visible political figure in Russia, and was elected the representative of Leningrad (Saint Petersburg) in 1990. Eventually, he became a member of the pro-democratic group of representatives in the Russian Parliament, and a supporter of such politicians as Anatoly Sobchak and the first President of Russia Boris Yeltsin. He was a strong proponent of returning the original name to the city of Saint Petersburg. He quit politics after 2000, and focused on his acting career.

He condemned the annexation of Crimea in 2014, and signed a public letter condemning the 2022 Russian invasion of Ukraine in support of Ukraine.

== Selected filmography ==
- The Foundling (Подкидыш) as boy on the bike (1940)
- The Bride (Невеста) as Andrey Andreevich (1956)
- The Hot Soul (Горячая Душа) as Strelnikov (1959)
- The Garnet Bracelet (Гранатовый Браслет) as Vasily Lvovich (1964)
- Conspiracy of Ambassadors (Заговор Послов) as Robert Lockhart, head of the British mission (1965)
- Older Sister (Старшая Сестра) as Oleg Medynsky (1966)
- The Seventh Companion (Седьмой спутник) as arrested officer (1967)
- The Living Corpse (Живой Труп) as Viktor Mikhailovich Karenin (1968)
- Incredible Yehudiel Chlamyda (Невероятный Иегудиил Хламида) as Kosterin (1969)
- The Ballad of Bering and His Friends (Баллада о Беринге и Его Друзьях) as Ivan Alekseevich Dolgorukov, Prince (1970)
- The Return of Saint Luke (Возвращение «Святого Луки») as Yuri Konstantinovich Loskutov, engineer, antiques speculator (1970)
- Eternal Call (Вечный зов) as Arnold Lakhnovsky (1973-1983)
- Day of Admittance on Personal Matters (День Приёма по Личным Вопросам) as Dyatlov (1974)
- Did You Call the Doctor? (Врача вызывали?) as Pyotr Ivanovich, head physician of polyclinic No. 8 (1974)
- Take Aim (Выбор цели) as Boris Pash (1974)
- Balloonist (Воздухоплаватель) as Dmitry Timofeevich Ptashnikov (1975)
- A Slave of Love (Раба любви) as Savva Yakovlevich Yuzhakov, film producer (1976)
- Always with me... (Всегда со мною...) as Vasily Antonovich Rubtsov (1976)
- The Days of the Turbins (Дни Турбиных) as Vladimir Talberg (1976)
- The Life and Death of Ferdinand Luce (Жизнь и Смерть Фердинанда Люса) as Jürgen Kreutzman (1976)
- Funny People! (Смешные Люди!) as Fedor Akimovich, investigator (1977)
- Office Romance (Служебный роман) as Yuri Grigorievich Samokhvalov, deputy director of a statistical institution (1977)
- Colonel Chabert (Полковник Шабер) as Derville, lawyer (1978)
- Robbery at the Midnight (Ограбление в Полночь) as "Chief" (1978)
- There are no Special Signs (Особых Примет Нет) as Nikolaev (1978)
- Autumn Marathon (Осенний марафон) as Andrey Buzykin (1979)
- Say a Word for the Poor Hussar (...О бедном гусаре замолвите слово) as count Merzlyaev (1981)
- Station for Two (Вокзал для двоих) as Platon Ryabinin (1982)
- Together with Dunaevsky (Вместе с Дунаевским) (1984)
- And then Came Bumbo... (И вот Пришёл Бумбо...) as Ilya Mitrofanovich, father of Sashenka (1984)
- Complicity in Murder (Соучастие в Убийстве) as Thomas Hobson, Beth Tyson's wealthy lover (1985)
- Confrontation (Противостояние) as police colonel, criminal investigation officer, Vladislav Nikolaevich Kostenko (1985)
- Uncle Vanya. Scenes From Village Life (Дядя Ваня. Сцены из Деревенской Жизни) as Ivan Petrovich Voynitsky (1986)
- Face to Face (Лицом к Лицу) as Gadilin (1986)
- Courier (Курьер) as writer Semyon Kuznetsov, Katya's father (1986)
- End of the World Followed by Symposium (Конец Света с Последующим Симпозиумом) as Stanley Barrett (1987)
- The Great Game (Большая Игра) as Brenner (1988)
- Zerograd (Город Зеро) as writer Vasily Chugunov (1988)
- Chernov/Chernov (Чернов/Chernov) as Vsevolod Yarmak (1990)
- The Case (Дело) as Kandid Kastorovich Tarelkin (1991)
- Promised Heaven (Небеса обетованные) as Fedor Stepanovich Yelistratov, Fima’s brother (1991)
- Ticket to the Red Theater, or Death of a Gravedigger (Билет в Красный Театр, или Смерть Гробокопателя) as Police Lieutenant Colonel Kuznetsov (1992)
- Prediction (Предсказание) as writer Oleg Vladimirovich Goryunov (1993)
- Dreams (Сны) as Count Dmitry Prizorov (1993)
- Heads and Tails (Орёл и решка) as Professor Valentin Petrovich Savitsky (1995)
- Judge in the Trap (Судья в Ловушке) as Squizem (1998)
- What the Dead Man Said (Что Сказал Покойник) as mafia chief (1999)
- Gangster Petersburg 2 (Бандитский Петербург 2) as Lawyer, Nikolai Stepanovich Prokhorenko, prosecutor of St. Petersburg (episodes 1, 6-8) (2000)
- The Romanovs: An Imperial Family (Романовы. Венценосная семья) as professor Sergey Fedorov (2000)
- Poisons or the World History of Poisoning (Яды, или Всемирная история отравлений) as Prokhorov/Pope Alexander VI (2001)
- Under the Roofs of a Big City (Под Крышами Большого Города) as Dimov (2002)
- Azazel (Азазель) as general Lavrenty Mizinov (2003)
- The Idiot (Идиот) as general Ivan Yepanchin (2003)
- Dear Masha Berezina (Дорогая Маша Березина) as Gennady Norstein (2004)
- The Master and Margarita (Мастер и Маргарита) as Woland (2005)
- Leningradets (Ленинградец) as Nikolai Savitsky (2005)
- Sonya with Golden Hands (Сонька — Золотая Ручка) as Levit Sandanovich (2006)
- Liquidation (Ликвидация) as esoteric Igor Semenovich (2007)
- Don't Think About White Monkeys (Не Думай про Белых Обезьян) as one of the Authors (2008)
- Marevo (Марево) as Afanasy Ivanovich Tovstogub (2008)
- Off the Hook (Взятки Гладки) as Mr. Vyshnevsky (2008)
- Palm Sunday (Вербное Воскресенье) as Gennady Matveyevich Nikitin, Arthur's grandfather, member of the Politburo of the CPSU Central Committee (2009)
- The New Adventures of Aladdin (Новые Приключения Аладдина) as Narrator (2011)
- The Farmer (Хуторянин) as Pavel Ignatievich Sukhomlinov, owner (2013)
- Without Borders (Без границ) (2015) as George
- Didn't Expect (Не Ждали) as Innokenty Mikhailovich, musician (2019)

== Awards and honors ==
- Order of the Red Banner of Labour (1979)
- Order "For Merit to the Fatherland":
  - 2nd class (28 October 2019)
  - 3rd class (5 February 2009) - for outstanding contribution to the development of domestic theatrical art and many years of fruitful activity
  - 4th class (13 February 2004) - for outstanding contribution to the development of domestic theatrical art'
- Order of Friendship (17 December 1994) - for services to the people associated with the development of Russian statehood, the achievements in labor, science, culture, arts, strengthening friendship and cooperation between nations
- Honored Artist of the RSFSR (1969)
- People's Artist of the RSFSR (1977)
- People's Artist of the USSR (1984)
- Vasilyev Brothers State Prize of the RSFSR (1979) - for his role as Samokhvalov in the movie Office Romance
- Prize of the Government of St. Petersburg in the field of literature, art and architecture
- Gold Soffit Award for Best Actor (1997)
- Golden Mask Award for Best Actor (2009) - the role of Prince K. in the play "Uncle's Dream"
- International Theatre Prize in 2009 in the category "for his contribution to Russian theatre"
- Honorary Member of Russian Academy of Arts
- Presidential Order of Excellence (2010, Georgia)
- Order of Honour (2014)
