= Valery Fokin =

Russian theatrical director and writer

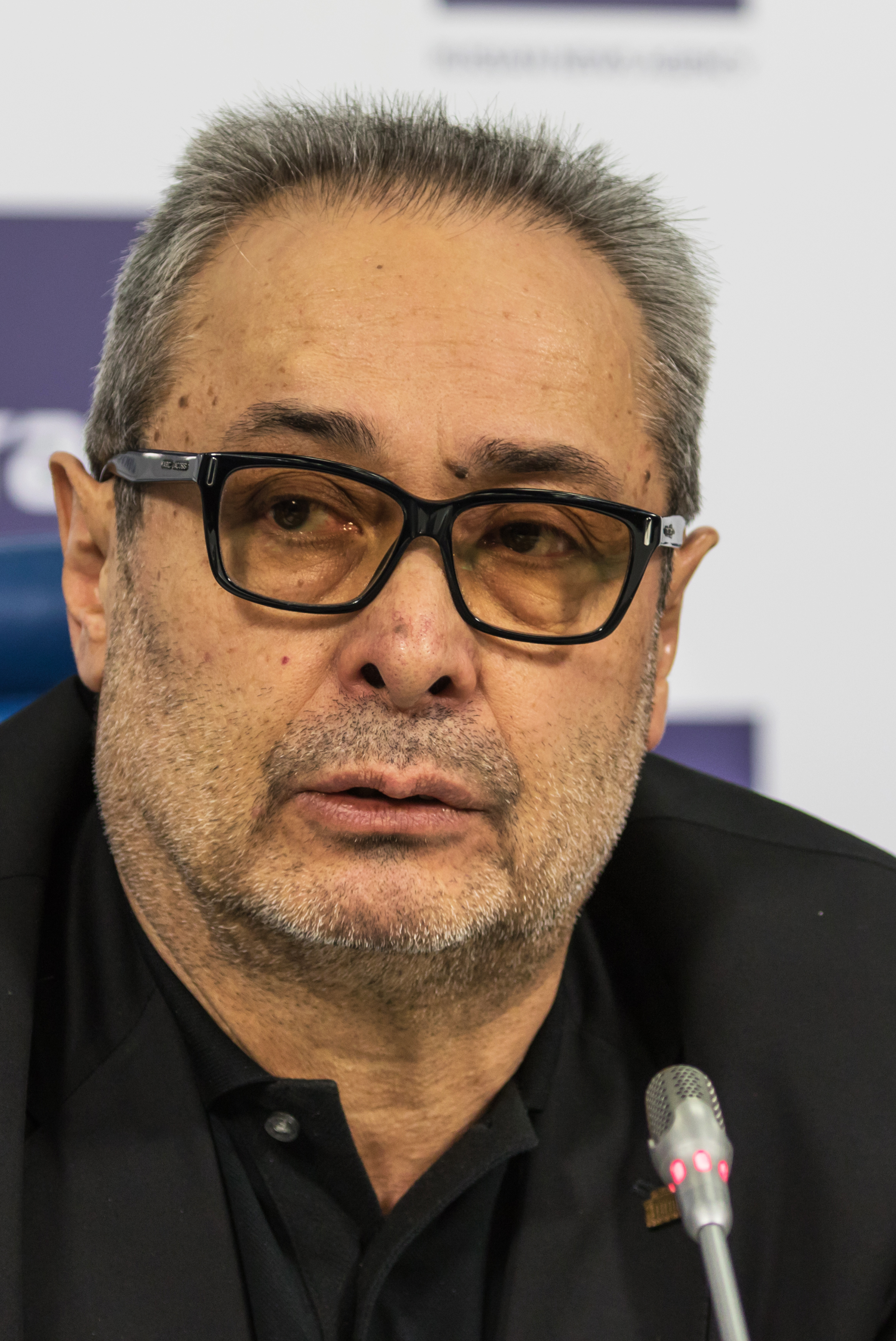
Valery Fokin (2016)

Valery Vladimirovich Fokin (Russian: Валерий Владимирович Фокин; born 28 February 1946) is a Soviet and Russian theatrical and film director, actor and pedagogue. He is the Artistic Director of the Alexandrinsky Theatre in Saint Petersburg, and the President of The Meyerhold Centre in Moscow. Fokin is decorated with four honorary Russian state awards.

== Biography ==
Fokin was born in Moscow in 1946. After graduating from the Boris Shchukin Theatre Institute in 1968, where he staged his first performance, Fokin began directing at Moscow's Sovremennik Theatre where he worked for 15 years. During the 1970s and 1980s, Fokin made a name for himself in the Russian theatrical world by directing plays at this theatre and the Yermolova Theatre. In 1971, he directed Valentin and Valentina, a play written the same year by Mikhail Roshchin. In 1973, he directed the plays An Incident with a Paginator and Twenty Minutes with an Angel at Sovremennik. Fokin also worked as a professor at the GITIS from 1975–1979 and at the Higher State Theatre School in Kraków from 1993–1994.

In 1985, Fokin took over the Moscow Theatre. His 1985 play, Speak!, was the first play in Russia to forecast that the Soviet Union would diminish and that Russia would enter a new political period, marked by Mikhail Gorbachev's perestroika political and economic reforms, introduced in June 1987. In 1989, Fokin was at the centre of an actor's dispute at the Yermolova Theatre, fueled by negative reviews of his Dostoevsky play, The Idiot. He left the theatre and Russia and put on performances in Poland and Switzerland in 1990.

Fokin is noted for his association with Vsevolod Meyerhold. In 1988, he became the chairman of the Commission on Meyerhold's Creative Legacy and in 1991 founded the Meyerhold Centre in Moscow, which became a state institution in 1999.

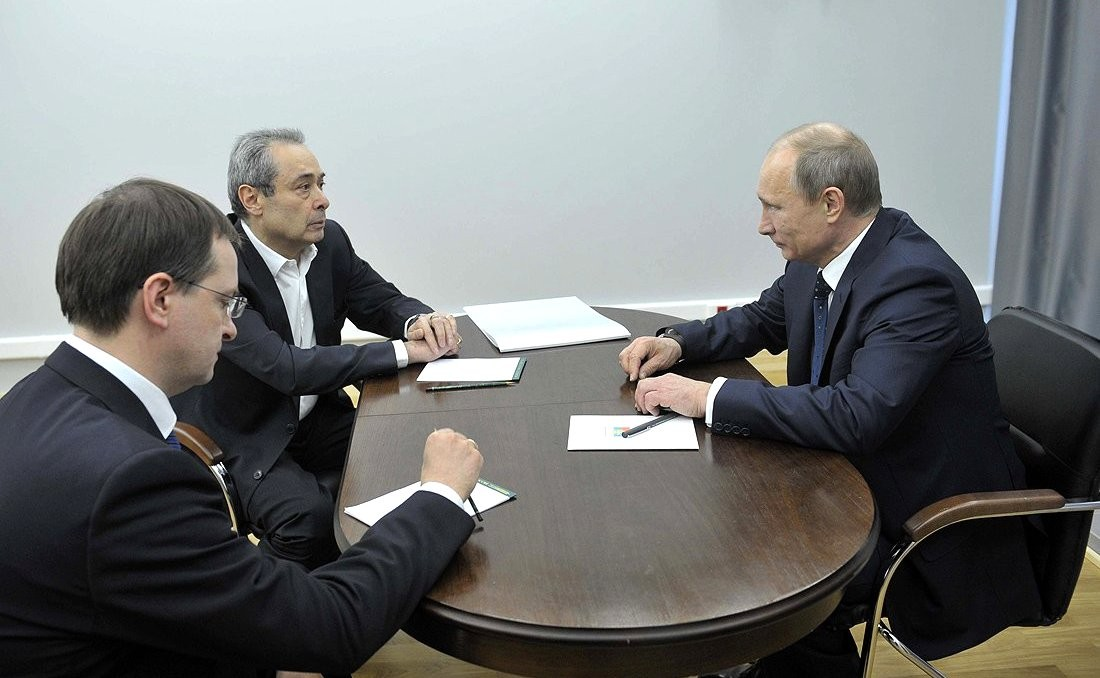
Russian President Vladimir Putin, Minister of Culture Vladimir Medinsky and Valery Fokin (center)

In 1994, Fokin produced the play, A Hotel Room in the Town of N, based on Nikolai Gogol's novel, Dead Souls in Moscow. Then in 1995 he garnered critical acclaim for his theatrical production of Metamorphosis at the Satirikon Theatre. The play was based on Franz Kafka's 1915 novel, which Fokin also made into a feature film in 2002, screening at festivals in Tokyo, Moscow, Vyborg, and Karlovy Vary. In 1996, Fokin produced Three performances in the Manege in Moscow in March 1996 and Transformations in Saint-Petersburg from November–December 1996.

Fokin is a writer and contributor to the weekly Moscow newspaper Kultura, which also employs a number of notable cultural figures and writers such as Fokin and Fazil Iskander.

== Style ==
Fokin has directed plays by the likes of Nabokov, Vampilov, Rozov and Albee. He is noted for his use of dramatic metaphor and pathos in his productions. He often draws upon poignant real life historical events or references, reflecting a predominantly artistic view of the world and an often paradoxical truth. Fokin has directed plays in Poland, Hungary, Germany, Finland, Greece, Switzerland, Japan, France and the United States.

== Awards ==
Fokin is a laureate and recipient of four Russian State awards. On 29 January 1996 he was decorated with the People's Artist of Russia by Presidential Decree No. 116. On 26 February 2006 Fokin was awarded the Decoration for Service to Saint Petersburg, by Decree No. 172 of the President of the Russian Federation. Also in 2006, he became an honorary member of the Presidium of the Presidential Council for Culture and the Arts of the Russian Federation. In 2008, he was awarded the Russian National Theatre Award and his production, The Marriage, earned the Golden Mask award in “The Best Director’s Work” category. In 2018 he was awarded the Europe Theatre Prize for the versatility of his work, his eclecticism, his human qualities and his complete dedication to mastering a theatre profession in which working on the full growth of the actor is central, including ongoing cultural, interior and spiritual enrichment.

== Europe Theatre Prize ==
In 2018, he received the XVII Europe Theatre Prize, in Saint Petersburg. The Prize organization stated:

«The profession is like the alphabet: the more you are able to use it, the more it allows you to express yourself.» These words of Valery Fokin sum up his conception of theatre and - even more precisely - of directing. For this leading Russian artist, a graduate of the Chtchoukine Theatre Academy, who has practised his art on prestigious stages such as the Sovremennik Theatre and the Yermolova Theatre (of which he has also been the artistic director) in Moscow, the director has to be a kind of polymath, eclectic and erudite, in order to experience the different forms of human existence and be able to put them to work across the range of dramatic fiction. For Valery Fokin, theatre cannot and must not be reduced to a simple process of entertainment or commercial promotion, but must serve as a means to allow the artist to acquire a rich and colourful internal vocabulary. Valery Fokin’s multi-faceted nature is well known on the Russian stage, for he has succeeded magisterially in welding the old and the new, philosophy and psychology, imagination and technique. He is equally renowned for his ability to add the most concise inspirations, as it were, to the other standard features of the most celebrated works of theatre. He has been president of the Commission to preserve the work of Meyerhold, which became the Meyerhold Creation Centre thanks to the support of the Russian Theatre Workers’ Union and the Russian Architects’ Union. At the present time he is director of the Alexandrinsky Theatre of St Petersburg. Here he staged performances based on the works of Lermontov, Dostoevsky, Tolstoy and Gogol. His performances at the Alexandrinsky theatre received recognition from the Russian and international community. For many years, the Director conducts master classes and teaches in Russia and abroad. This year Valery Fokin is awarded the XVII Europe Theatre Prize in recognition of his revolutionary conceptions in both the social and the institutional domain.
