= Marina Zudina =

Soviet and Russian actress

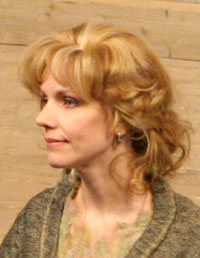
- Born: 3 September 1965 (age 61); Moscow, USSR
- Occupation: actress
- Years active: 1985–present
- Spouse: Oleg Tabakov (m. 1994; died 2018)
- Children: Pavel; Maria

Marina Vyacheslavovna Zudina (Russian: Марина Вячеславовна Зудина; born 3 September 1965) is a Soviet and Russian actress of theatre and cinema.

== Biography ==
=== Early life and education ===
Marina Vyacheslavovna Zudina was born on 3 September 1965 in Moscow. Her father was a journalist and her mother was a music teacher. As a child, Marina took dancing, singing and ballet lessons.

In 1986, she graduated from GITIS (course of Oleg Tabakov and Avangard Leontiev).

=== Career ===
Immediately after GITIS, she was admitted to the Theater studio of Oleg Tabakov. Some of the plays she performed were "Ordinary Story" (Elizaveta Alexandrovna), "Nord Ost" (Olga), "Overstuffed Bochotara" (Sylvia), "Matrosskaya Tishina" (Tanya), "The Myth of Don Juan" (Elmira), "Mechanical piano" (Sofya Egorovna), "Last" (Love) and "Farewell ... and applaud!" (Madalena).

Zudina began to act in cinema as a student. One of her first roles - Valentina in Georgy Natanson's melodrama Valentin and Valentina (1985) based on the play by Mikhail Roshchina - she played while in her third year of studies. Then, there were the films Personal Case of Judge Ivanova (1985), After the Rain, on Thursday (1985), Through Main Street with an Orchestra (1986).

In 1987, the drama of Yevgeny Gerasimov's Fun of the Young was released, where Zudina played a different role from her previous ones. Her character is an arrogant student of the technical school, who decides to make the teacher of physical education fall in love with her, so that she and her friends can get good grades.

In the late 1980s and early 1990s, Zudina often played the roles of girls who came to conquer Moscow. In the drama Life by the Limit (1989) Alexei Rudakova, she plays Limitchitsa Masha; in the comedy Andrei Razumovsky Mordashka (1990) - a hairdresser who came to conquer Moscow; in the detective Boris Grigoriev's Confession of the Keepers (1992) - a business and energetic girl who came to Moscow to go to VGIK.

Among the latest works of the actress are the television series Behind the Scenes (2002), Yesenin (2005), Adjutants of Love (2006), films Jubilee (2007) and The Non-lonely Ones (2009).

Zudina continues to act in the Theatre Studio, some of the performances are "Mad Day, or The Marriage of Figaro" (Rosina), "Uncle Vanya" (Elena Andreevna), "Idiot" (Nastasya Filippovna), "Every Sage is quite simple" (Mamaeva), "Sublimation of Love" (Paola).

In the Moscow Art Theatre, she performed in the plays Antigone (Antigone), Duck Hunt (Galina), The Last Victim by A. Ostrovsky (Julia Tugina), Tartuffe (Elmira).

=== Personal life ===
Zudina was married to Oleg Tabakov from 1994 until his death in 2018. The pair become romantically involved when Zudina was his student at GITIS. They have two children: Pavel (born 1995) and Maria "Masha" (born 2006).

== Filmography ==
- 1985 — Still love, still hope
- 1985 — Return of Budulai
- 1985 — Valentin and Valentina
- 1985 — Personal case of judge Ivanova
- 1985 — After the Rain, on Thursday
- 1986 — The trip of monsenior Perrishone
- 1986 — Through Main Street with an Orchestra
- 1987 — Joys of the Youth
- 1989 — Limited life
- 1989 — The noble outlaw Vladimir Dubrovski
- 1990 — Cutie
- 1990 — Under auroras
- 1992 — Confessions of Contribution
- 1992 — The 30th Must be Terminated!
- 1995 — Mute Witness
- 1995 — Tribunal
- 1996 — Golden mist
- 1996 — Funny stuff, family stuff
- 1998 — Two steps from sky
- 2002 — Behind the curtains
- 2005 — Yesenin
- 2005 — Adjutants of Love
- 2007 — Jubilee (Юбилей)
- 2009 — Not Alone
- 2019 — Gold Diggers as Lyudmila Dolgachova
- 2020 — Wolf as Raisa Umanskaya
