= Valentin and Valentina =

- Russian: Валентин и Валентина
- Directed by: Georgy Natanson
- Written by: Georgy Natanson; Mikhail Roshchin
- Starring: Marina Zudina; Nikolay Stotskiy; Tatyana Doronina; Nina Ruslanova; Zinaida Dekhtyaryova
- Cinematography: Viktor Yakushev
- Edited by: Antonina Zimina
- Music by: Eugen Doga
- Production company: Mosfilm
- Release date: 1985
- Running time: 93 min.
- Country: Soviet Union
- Language: Russian

Valentin and Valentina (Russian: Валентин и Валентина, romanized: Valentin i Valentina) is a 1985 Soviet teen romance film directed by Georgy Natanson.

== Plot ==
The film tells about an eighteen-year-old guy and girl who understand that love is not only a bright and romantic feeling, but also a lot of spiritual work.

== Cast ==
- Marina Zudina as Valentina
- Nikolay Stotskiy as Valentin
- Tatyana Doronina as Valentina's mother
- Nina Ruslanova as Valentin's mother
- Zinaida Dekhtyaryova as Valentina's grandmother
- Larisa Udovichenko as Zhenya
- Boris Shcherbakov as Sasha Gusev
- Lyusyena Ovchinnikova as Rita
- Valeri Khlevinsky as Volodya
- Yuri Vasilyev as Slava
