= Kassil =

Kassil is a surname. Notable people with the surname include:

- Brittany Kassil (born 1991), Canadian rugby union player
- Lev Kassil (1905–1970), Soviet-Russian writer
