= Alexander Lazarev (actor) =

Soviet and Russian theater and film actor

Alexander Sergeevich Lazarev Александр Сергеевич Лазарев
- Born: 3 January 1938; Leningrad, Russian SFSR, Soviet Union
- Died: 2 May 2011 (aged 73); Moscow, Russian Federation
- Occupation: Actor
- Years active: 1961–2011
- Spouse: Svetlana Nemolyaeva
- Awards: People's Artist of the RSFSR (1977)

Alexander Sergeyevich Lazarev (Алекса́ндр Серге́евич Ла́зарев; 3 January 1938 – 2 May 2011) was a Soviet and Russian theater and film actor, the People's Artist of Russia and the USSR State Prize laureate (both 1977). A Moscow Mayakovsky Theater veteran (where throughout his fifty years career he played more than fifty parts) Lazarev appeared in more than 100 films, including One More Thing About Love (1968) which made him famous.

== Biography ==
Alexander Lazarev was born in Leningrad, to the artist and designer Sergey Nikolayevich Lazarev (1899–1984) and Olympiada Kuzminichna Lazareva (née Tarasova, (1907–1996). The family survived the first month of the Siege, then managed to get out of the city and make it to Orenburg. In 1944 they returned home and the next year Alexander went to school. By the time of graduation he's made a decision to become an actor, citing later Robert Taylor's performance in Waterloo Bridge as the major influence. In 1955 Lazarev joined the Young actors' studio at the Moscow Art Theater. After a short stint at the Nikolay Akimov-led Saint Petersburg Comedy Theatre, he moved to Mayakovsky Theater, led at the time by Nikolay Okhlopkov where the part of Boytsov the electrician in Aleksei Arbuzov's The Irkutsk Story was his first success.

In 1961 Lazarev debuted in film, in thriller melodrama Free Wind (Вольный ветер, 1961), based on Isaak Dunayevsky's operetta of the same name. Among his other notable theatre roles of the 1960s were the sailor anarchist Gushcha in Between the Rainfalls (Okhlopkov's last production there), uber-lieutenant Schering in The Defector (1964) and Varavvin in Pyotr Fomenko-directed The Death of Tarelkin (1966). The leading part of physicist Yevdokimov in Georgy Natanson's 1968 film One More Thing About Love (Ещё раз про любовь, co-starring Tatyana Doronina) brought Lazarev nationwide acclaim.

The director Andrey Goncharov's arrival as Mayakovsky Theater marked the second phase of Alexander Lazarev's successful career there. First his performance as Don Quixote in A Man of La Mancha was lauded by critics, then the leading part in Venceremos!, after Genrikh Borovik's play, earned him the USSR State Prize. Among Lazarev's other important stage works of the period were General Khludov (in Flight, 1978, based on Mikhail Bulgakov's play), Rittmeister in The Life of Klim Samgin (1981, after an unfinished Maxim Gorky's novel, premiered as a TV play in 1986), and Vladimir Mayakovsky in Mark Rozovsky's The Beginnings (1983). In A Crayfish Laughs (1986, a play about the life of Sarah Bernhardt, the latter played by his wife Svetlana Nemolyaeva), Lazarev managed at last to realize his comedy actor potential to the full. Then followed Circle (1988, after W. Somerset Maugham's 1921 play), A Patron's Joke (1992, after Arkady Averchenko) and Victim of Our Age (1994, the adaptation of Alexandr Ostrovsky's The Last Victim), the latter earning Lazarev the Moscow Prize for Literature and Arts. He received another prestigious award, Chrystal Turandot, for the leading part of Edmund Kean in Kean the Fourth, Tatyana Akhramkova's production of Grigory Gorin's play.

Lazarev continued to appear in films throughout the 2000s but none of those were particularly successful. "In theater he was continuously demonstrating his brilliance, his versatility, his comedy actor's potential. In cinema? Silence. Not one of our famous film directors has ever invited him to play a more or less substantial part. 'What we have we neglect, once we lose it – mourn it'," author and critic Edward Radzinsky, speaking on the Russian TV (and quoting the Russian proverb) commented in 2011.

Alexander Lazarev died in Abramtsevo, Moscow Oblast, on 2 May 2011. He is interred in Troyekurovskoye Cemetery in Moscow.

== Family ==
On 27 March 1960 Alexander Lazarev married a fellow Mayakovsky Theater actress Svetlana Nemolyaeva. They lived happily with for 51 years, until his death. Their son Aleksander Lazarev Jr. (born 27 April 1967) is a Lencom actor, the People's Artist of Russia (2007) and the State Prize (1996) laureate.

Alexander Lazarev's younger brother Yuri (born 22 July 1944), a Saint Petersburg Comedy Theatre actor, has been honoured with the Meritorious Artist (1994) and the People's Artist of Russia (2009) titles.

== Selected filmography ==
- 1961 — Free Wind as Yango (leading role)
- 1964 — Taking Fire Upon Ourselves as Fyodor, partisan unit commander
- 1966 — On a Wild Shore as Sakko
- 1967 — In the Beautiful Furious World (TV play)
- 1967 — Revenge (Возмездие) as German doctor
- 1968 — Portrait of Dorian Gray as Basil
- 1968 — One Thing More About Love as Yevdokimov, physicist (leading role)
- 1968 — Knight of Dream as clairvoyant musician
- 1969 — Late Flowers as doctor Toporkov (leading role)
- 1971 — Deadly Enemy as Yaschurov
- 1971 — Talents and Followers (TV play) as Meluzov
- 1971 — Blackened Crumpets (USSR-GDR)
- 1971 — What to Do? (TV play, author)
- 1972 — In Answer for Everything as Mashkov, physicist
- 1972 — 17th Transatlantic as captain Lukhmanov
- 1973 — Dmitry Kantemir as Peter the Great
- 1973 — An Hour Before Dawn as Derzhavin
- 1974 — Movie Star as Igor Grekov, film director
- 1974 — Time of Her Sons as Gulyaev, a physicist
- 1975 — Led By a Bright Light as actor
- 1975 — A Boy With an Épée as Artemyev, school director
- 1975 — Such a Short Life as Kalugin
- 1975 — Black Sea Waves as general Zarya-Zaryanitsky
- 1976 — Your Own Opinion as Konstantinov, partkom secretary
- 1977 — Risk is a Virtue as Listov, actor
- 1977 — The Long Ordeal as Zhadov
- 1978 — Velvet Season as Lamer
- 1978 — Where Were You, Odysseus? as oberführer Warburg
- 1978 — Gamblers (TV play) as Krugel
- 1979 — Lucrative Contract as Tregubov, KGB general
- 1979 — Month of Long Days as Aleksandr Nikolayevich
- 1980 — Evening Labyrinth as Main Attractions boss
- 1980 — Through Thorns to the Stars as professor Klimov
- 1981 — The Nightly Fairytale as Peter Munk
- 1981 — Uncle's Dream (TV play) as governor general
- 1981 — The Hunter (TV play) as Zubarin
- 1982 — Take Care of Men! as Grafov, a sculptor
- 1982 — Inspector Losev as Zurikh
- 1983 — Demidovs as Peter the Great
- 1983 — Crazy Day of Engineer Barkasov as Doctor
- 1985 — The Strange Story of Dr. Jekyll and Mr. Hyde as Lanyon
- 1985 — Children of the Sun as Vagin, artist
- 1986 — Through Main Street with an Orchestra as Romanovsky
- 1986 — The Mysterious Prisoner as Alexander II of Russia
- 1986 — Secret Ambassador as Peter the Great
- 1986 — The Life of Klim Samgin as Roman Georgievich, Rittmeister
- 1987 — Its Not Always Summer in Crimea as Nikolay Semashko
- 1988 — The Adventures of Quentin Durward as Louis XI
- 1989 — Differed of Characters as Gorohov (leading role)
- 1989 — The Stepanchikovo Village and Its Inhabitants as Colonel Egor Rostanev
- 1990 — The War Was Tomorrow (TV play) as Lyberetsky
- 2002 — Kean the Fourth (TV play) as Edmund Kean (leading role)

== Literature ==
- Дубровский В. Серебряный шнур: А. Лазарев, С. Немоляева, А. Лазарев-младший. М., 2001.
