= Alexander Lazarev =

Alexander Lazarev may refer to:

- Alexander Lazarev (conductor) (born 1945), Russian conductor
- Alexander Lazarev (actor) (1938–2011), Soviet and Russian theater and film actor

== See also ==
- Alexandar Lazarov (born 1997), Bulgarian tennis player
