= Basilashvili =

Basilashvili (Georgian: ბასილაშვილი, romanized: basilashvili, pronounced [basilaʃʷili]) is a Georgian surname. Notable people with the surname include:

- Oleg Basilashvili (born 1934), Soviet/Russian film and theatre actor
- Nikoloz Basilashvili (born 1992), Georgian tennis player
