= Gennadi Bogachyov (actor) =

Soviet and Russian actor (1945–2023)

- Born: Gennadi Petrovich Bogachyov; 6 March 1945; Shatsk, Ryazan Oblast, RSFSR, Soviet Union
- Died: 25 April 2023 (aged 78); Saint Petersburg, Russia
- Occupation: Actor
- Years active: 1969–2023

Gennadi Petrovich Bogachyov (Russian: Генна́дий Петро́вич Богачёв; 6 March 1945 – 25 April 2023) was a Soviet and Russian stage and film actor, in the troupe of the Bolshoi Drama Theater in Saint Petersburg since 1969. In 1990 he was awarded the People's Artist of the RSFSR, and in 2015 Russia's Golden Mask award for best supporting male actor in a drama.

== Biography ==
Bogachyov was born on 6 March 1945, in the town of Shatsk, Ryazan Oblast. In 1969 he graduated from the acting faculty of LGITMiK and was admitted to the troupe of the Leningrad Drama Theater. Since the early 1980s he was one of the leading artists of the theater.

His most famous works in cinema are small but memorable, including the roles of the waiter Dima in Holidays in September and Stamford in the first episode of the television film series Sherlock Holmes and Dr. Watson.

Bogachyov was the uncle of actress Alisa Bogart. He died on 25 April 2023, at age 78.

== Filmography ==
- Khanuma (1978) as Kote
- Sherlock Holmes and Dr. Watson (1979) as Stamford
- Speed (1983) as Nina's husband
- Moonzund (1987) as Stashevsky
- Brezhnev (2005) as Nikolai Shchelokov
- The Master and Margarita (2005) as Aloisy Mogarych
- Simple Things (2007) as Psaryov

=== Dubbing ===
- Robin Williams
  - Aladdin – Genie
  - Aladdin and the King of Thieves – Genie
  - Bicentennial Man – Andrew Martin
  - Flubber – Professor Philip Brainard
  - Night at the Museum – Theodore Roosevelt
  - Night at the Museum: Secret of the Tomb – Theodore Roosevelt / Garuda's voice
  - Old Dogs – Dan Rayburn
- Danny DeVito
  - Be Cool – Martin Weir
  - Big Fish – Amos Calloway
  - Deck the Halls – Buddy Hall
  - The Rainmaker – Deck Shifflet
  - What's the Worst That Could Happen? – Max Fairbanks
  - When in Rome – Al
- Tommy Lee Jones
  - The Client – Roy "Reverend Roy" Foltrigg
  - The Fugitive – U.S. Marshal Samuel Gerard
  - JFK – Clay Shaw / Clay Bertrand
  - Under Siege – William Strannix
  - Volcano – Michael Roark
- Richard Gere
  - Final Analysis – Dr. Isaac Barr
  - Runaway Bride – Homer Eisenhower "Ike" Graham
  - Sommersby – John "Jack" Sommersby
- Cliff Robertson
  - Spider-Man – Ben Parker
  - Spider-Man 2 – Ben Parker
  - Spider-Man 3 – Ben Parker
- Air Force One – Defense Secretary Walter Dean (Dean Stockwell)
- The Bone Collector – Captain Howard Cheney (Michael Rooker)
- Falling Down – Captain Bill Yardley (Raymond J. Barry)
- Forever Young – Harry Finley (George Wendt)
- Last Action Hero – Benedict (Charles Dance)
- The Marrying Man – Charley Pearl (Alec Baldwin)
- Mighty Joe Young – Andrei Strasser (Rade Šerbedžija)
- Ransom – Tom Mullen (Mel Gibson)
- The Rock – FBI Agent Ernest Paxton (William Forsythe)
- Titanic – Spicer Lovejoy (David Warner)

== Awards and honors ==
- Honored Artist of the RSFSR (1982)
- People's Artist of the RSFSR (1990)
- Order of Friendship (2004)
- Medal of the Order "For Merit to the Fatherland", 2nd class (2009)
- Golden Sofit for Best Acting Ensemble (2012)
- Golden Mask (2015) for Best Supporting Actor
- Order of Honour (2018)
