= Yefim Kopelyan =

- Ефим Копелян
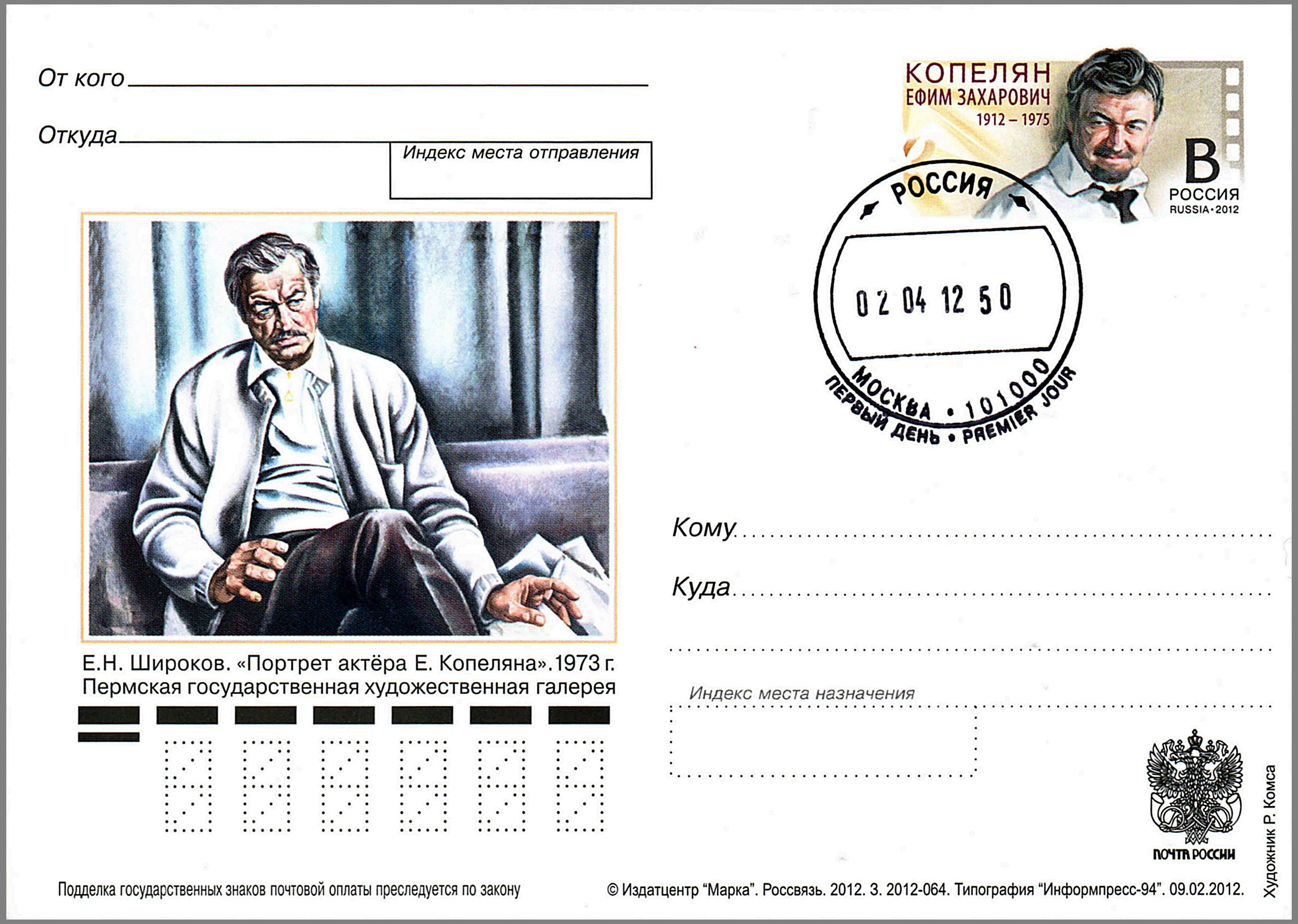
- 2012 postcard featuring Kopelyan
- Born: 12 April 1912 [O.S. 30 March] Rechytsa, Minsk Governorate, Russian Empire (present-day Belarus)
- Died: 6 March 1975 (aged 62); Vsevolozhsk, Russian SFSR, Soviet Union
- Resting place: Literatorskiye Mostki, Saint Petersburg
- Occupation: Actor

Yefim Zakharovich Kopelyan (Note: Russian: Ефим Захарович Копелян, romanized: Yefim Zakharovich Kopelyan; Belarusian: Яфім Захаравіч Капелян, romanized: Yafim Zakharavich Kapyelyan) (12 April 1912 [O.S. 30 March]–6 March 1975) was a Soviet actor of theatre and cinema, one of the legendary masters of the Bolshoi Theatre of Drama (BDT) in Leningrad. He performed bright, characteristic roles in the films The Elusive Avengers, Intervention, Eternal Call, The Straw Hat, and many others. He is also known for the voice-over in the hit TV series Seventeen Moments of Spring.

He was born in the Belarusian town Rechytsa into a Jewish family. After graduation, he worked as a metal craftsman at the plant Krasny Putilovets in Leningrad. In 1930, he entered the architectural department of the Academy of fine arts. In his students years he earned additionally as supernumerary in the BTD, entered to the studio of this theatre (course of K.K.Tverskoy).

At the end of his education, Kopelyan became an actor on the main staff of the BTD. These early years in the theatre were not notable for any special successes.

Later he played many roles, from the romantic Don Cesar de Bazan to the sailor Shvandya in Lyubov Yarovaya, roles of the classical repertoire and modern. He was a "social hero", playing character roles in comedies and tragedies. Georgi Tovstonogov employed Kopelyan almost in all premiers of theatre. With his name are connected all best plays BDT.

Operation Barbarossa found BTD in Baku on tour. On the return of the theatre on 4 July 1941 to Leningrad, Kopelyan entered the People's militia and played in the Theatre of the People's militia, which soon became the Front-line propaganda platoon of Leningrad.

Kopelyan acted in film and on TV a lot, and was the brilliant master of small roles: Steersman (Tanker Derbent, 1941), Priest Gapon (Prologue, 1956), Sergo Ordzhonikidze (Kochubey, 1958), Nalbandov (Time, forward!, 1966), Burnash (The Elusive Avengers, 1967), 1971: Cossack Leader Ataman in epic film Dauria (1971 film) (Даурия), Burtsev (The Story about human heart, 1975), Beybutov (Yaroslav Dombrovsky, 1976), etc. Among his best cinematic roles were Savva Morozov (Nikolai Bauman; the prize of the All-Union film festival, 1968), Svidrigaylov (Crime and punishment, 1970). He acted in television films Old fortress (1973), Crash of engineer Garin, and Eternal call.

His reading the text from the author in films Seven notes in silence (1967), Meetings with Gorky (1969), Memory (1971) and television film Seventeen Moments of Spring (1973, State prize of the RSFSR in 1976) was unique.

Kopelyan married actress Lyudmila Makarova in 1941. He was named a People's Artist of the USSR in 1973. He died in 1975 in Leningrad.

== Selected filmography ==
- The Gadfly (1955) as Head of the frontier
- Alexander Popov (1955) as Marquis Solari
- Old Khottabych (1956) as driller Jafar Ali Mohammed
- Mister Iks (1958) as Theodora's fan
- Goodbye, Boys (1964) as The Sheet Metal Worker
- Time, Forward! (1966) as Nalbandov
- The Elusive Avengers (1966) as Ataman Burnash
- Sofiya Perovskaya (1967) as Mikhail Loris-Melikov
- The New Adventures of the Elusive Avengers (1967) as Ataman Burnash
- Woman's World (1967) as Kaspar
- Dead Season (1968) as Smith (voice)
- Secret Agent's Destiny (1970) as General Sergeev
- Crime and Punishment (1970) as Svidrigailov
- The Seagull (1970) as Dorn
- Dauria (1971) as Cossack Leader Ataman
- The Crown of the Russian Empire, or Once Again the Elusive Avengers (1971) as Burnash
- Seventeen Moments of Spring (1973) as voice behind the scene
- Eternal Call (1973) as Mikhaylo Lukic Kaftanov
- Failure of Engineer Garin (1973) as Gaston Leclerc
- The Straw Hat (1974) as Bopertyui
- Jarosław Dąbrowski (1976) as Prince Beybutov
