= Stepmom (1973 film) =

1973 film directed by Oleg Bondarev

- Russian: Мачеха
- Directed by: Oleg Bondaryov
- Written by: Maria Khalfina; Sergey Smirnov
- Produced by: Alexander Yablochkin; Felix Weinfeld
- Starring: Tatiana Doronina; Leonid Nevedomsky
- Cinematography: Igor Chernykh
- Edited by: Alexandra Kamagorova
- Music by: Grigory Ponomarenko
- Production company: Mosfilm
- Release date: October 10, 1973
- Running time: 84 min.
- Country: Soviet Union
- Language: Russian

Stepmom (Russian: Мачеха, romanized: Machekha) is a 1973 Soviet comedy-drama film directed by Oleg Bondaryov and starring Tatiana Doronina, and Leonid Nevedomsky.

Doronina was recognized as Best Actress by Soviet Screen magazine, and was awarded the Film Festival in Tehran.

== Plot ==
In Pavel Olevantsev's family unexpectedly comes the news that his daughter was orphaned by another woman. Pavel did not know about the existence of the girl, nor could his wife know about it.

It's not easy to decide to take the child to your home. But it is much more difficult to put the girl to her, to give her the joy of childhood and the belief that she is not alone.

But Pavel's wife Shura, in spite of everything, believes that the love and affection that helped her all her life will help her survive this difficult situation.

== Cast ==
- Tatiana Doronina as Shura Olevantseva
- Leonid Nevedomsky as Pavel Olevantsev
- Lena Kostereva as Sveta, Pavel's illegitimate daughter
- Sasha Dalyky as Yurka
- Ira Khlopkova as Alyonka
- Nadezhda Fedosova as Shura's mother
- Vladimir Samoilov as Viktor Vikentievich
- Vera Kuznetsova as Yekaterina Alekseevna, teacher

== Release ==
Leader of Soviet film distribution 1973. Occupies by attendance 28th place among domestic films in history of Soviet film distribution (59.4 million viewers).
