= New Adventures of a Yankee in King Arthur's Court =

1988 film by Viktor Gres

New Adventures of a Yankee in King Arthur's Court Новые приключения янки при дворе короля Артура
- Directed by: Viktor Gres
- Written by: Viktor Gres; Mikhail Roshchin
- Based on: A Connecticut Yankee in King Arthur's Court; 1889 novel by Mark Twain
- Starring: Sergey Koltakov; Albert Filozov; Aleksandr Kaidanovsky
- Cinematography: Eduard Timlin; Aleksandr Yanovskiy
- Edited by: Veronika Arefyeva
- Music by: Oleg Karavaychuk
- Production company: Dovzhenko Film Studio
- Release date: 1988
- Running time: 164 minutes
- Country: Soviet Union
- Language: Russian

New Adventures of a Yankee in King Arthur's Court (Russian: Новые приключения янки при дворе короля Артура, romanized: Novye priklyucheniya yanki pri dvore korolya Artura) is a 1988 Soviet adventure film directed by Viktor Gres and based on American author Mark Twain's 1889 novel A Connecticut Yankee in King Arthur's Court. The screenplay was written by Mikhail Roshchin, and the film was produced by Dovzhenko Film Studio.

The film tells the story of an American pilot who is transported to King Arthur's court, where he must use his modern knowledge to survive the intrigues of medieval life and find a way back home.

== Plot ==
During one flight, an experienced American pilot and his crew encounter an unexpected disaster and fall into a time warp. The crew perishes, but the main character is transported to the medieval era, during the time of King Arthur. He is initially captured by one of the Knights of the Round Table, who shows him the life of slaves in this period. Using his knowledge from the modern era, he manages to secure his freedom and even earns a respectable position at the court, eventually becoming a knight. During this time, he learns the complexities of life at court. Hank begins to navigate the intrigues woven by various individuals and realizes he is an outsider in this world. Determined, he understands he must urgently find a way back home.

== Cast ==
- Sergey Koltakov as Hank Morgan
- Albert Filozov as King Arthur / Merlin
- Yelena Finogeyeva as Queen Ginevra
- Aleksandr Kaidanovsky as Sir Lancelot
- Anastasiya Vertinskaya as Morgan Le Fay
- Yevgeniy Yevstigneyev as Archbishop
- Evdokiya Germanova as Cindy
- Vladimir Soshalsky as Sagramor
- Vladimir Kashpur as slaver
- Mark Gres as Mordraig
- Anatoli Stolbov as abbot of the monastery
- Maria Kapnist as Fatum
- Elizaveta Dedova as maid of honor
- Vera Saranova as maid of honor
- Alexey Gorbunov as minstrel
