= Day of Admittance on Personal Matters =

1974 film directed by Solomon Shuster

- Russian: День приёма по личным вопросам
- Directed by: Solomon Shuster
- Written by: Pyotr Popogrebsky
- Starring: Anatoly Papanov; Oleg Zhakov; Zinaida Sharko; Yuri Komarov; Vladimir Zamanskiy
- Cinematography: Aleksandr Chechulin
- Music by: Boris Tishchenko
- Release date: 1974
- Running time: 88 minute
- Country: Soviet Union
- Language: Russian

Day of Admittance on Personal Matters (Russian: День приёма по личным вопросам) is a 1974 Soviet drama film directed by Solomon Shuster.

The head of the trust was able to eliminate the accident that occurred in one area. But this victory was a defeat for him.

== Plot ==
The film follows a day in the life of Boris Dmitrievich Ivanov, head of the "Energomontazh" trust. It’s a busy day, as he meets with employees about personal matters while also wrapping up the end of the half-year period. The trust is under pressure to complete the installation of new energy facilities and to retain the Red Banner awarded for success in socialist competition. To ensure success, Ivanov consults with the department head, who promises additional support if issues arise.

The trust’s specialists are preparing an 800 MW turbine for launch in Novo-Sergievsk. When they attempt to place it under industrial load, it begins to vibrate. Engineers have only an hour to solve the issue, which is critical for meeting the trust's targets. Engineer Temkin proposes an unconventional solution, which proves successful. Meanwhile, Ivanov also faces a challenging housing issue when his department head demands the allocation of apartments from the housing fund. Though Ivanov had intended to allocate an apartment to Temkin, who has been waiting a long time, he is forced to comply.

During the day, Ivanov also addresses a personnel matter involving Palmin, the director of a regional division. Palmin, a talented manager, is being prepared for a new assignment, but he is reluctant to leave his current post and team. Ivanov has to persuade him to set aside personal interests for the greater good.

At the end of the workday, Ivanov has a conversation with his deputy, Leonid Maslov, who advises him against using authoritarian methods and encourages him to inspire the staff instead. Ivanov stays late, awaiting confirmation that the stubborn director of the Novo-Sergievsk power plant has signed the acceptance certificate for the turbine. Before leaving, Ivanov makes a final call, taking a stand by refusing to hand over the apartments, thereby defying both his department head and patron.

== Cast ==
- Anatoly Papanov
- Oleg Zhakov
- Zinaida Sharko
- Yuri Komarov
- Vladimir Zamanskiy
- Oleg Basilashvili
- Lyudmila Maksakova
- Mikhail Khizhnyakov
- Ivan Solovyov
- Georgiy Burkov
