= Late Flowers =

- Directed by: Abram Room
- Written by: Abram Room
- Starring: Irina Lavrenteva; Alexander Lazarev; Olga Zhiznyeva; Valery Zolotukhin
- Cinematography: Leonid Kraynenkov
- Edited by: T. Zinchuk
- Music by: The film features excerpts from Symphonie Fantastique by Hector Berlioz in the performance of the State Symphony Orchestra of Cinematography running Nathan Rachlin
- Production company: Mosfilm
- Release date: 1970
- Running time: 95 min
- Country: Soviet Union
- Language: Russian

Late Flowers (Russian: Цветы запоздалые, romanized: Tsvety zapozdalye) is a 1970 romantic musical film based on the novella of the same name by Anton Chekhov wrote in the early period of the writer's work.

== Plot ==
This is a story about unrequited love and belated insight.

The film shows the life of the family Priklonsky princes. The main character of Princess Maria (Irina Lavrenteva) pretty nice girl, loves her mother (Olga Zhizneva) and brother Yegorushka (Valery Zolotukhin). Brother is also deeply flawed man, not wanting to get rid of bad habits.

Soon it appears in the narrative and Dr. Toporkov (Alexander Lazarev). Maria and Yegorushka ill, and the doctor Toporkov's mother called, because it was a high opinion of his professional qualities. He cured Priklonskii, took money from them, and that his visits to them over. However, Maroussia, having read novels about love, time to fall in love with the doctor.

Life heroes went downhill. Maroussia from all of life's troubles again ill. At the same Toporkov suddenly woke up feeling, but later, he finds himself unable to help her, and the princess died.

== Cast ==
- Irina Lavrenteva as Maroussia, Princess Priklonskaya
- Alexander Lazarev as Dr. Nikolai Semenovich Toporkov
- Olga Zhiznyeva as Princess Priklonskaya
- Valery Zolotukhin as Yegorushka
- Inna Ulyanova as Kaleria Ivanovna
- Alexander Khanov as Nikifor, valet
- Irina Chaliapina-Baksheeva as Prohorovna, matchmaker
- Zoya Vasilkova as Toporkova, the doctor's wife
