= Kultura (newspaper) =

- Type: Weekly newspaper
- Format: Broadsheet
- Staff writers: 150 +
- Founded: 1929 (1973)
- Headquarters: Moscow
- Circulation: 29,200 weekly

Kultura (Russian: Культура; lit. Culture), known as Sovetskaya Kultura (Советская культура) during the Soviet era, is a Russian newspaper, based in Moscow. The newspaper was previously published twice weekly but is currently a weekly newspaper. Today the newspaper circulates 29,200 copies a week, in all federal subjects of Russia.

== History ==
The newspaper's website states that the newspaper was founded on 6 November 1929, From 1931 the newspaper was published under the name "Soviet Art". Following its merger with "Literary Newspaper", it was published under the name "Literature and Art". In 1953 the newspaper was renamed "Soviet Culture" and became part of the Ministry of Culture of the USSR and the Central Committee of the Trade Union of Culture Workers. In 1973 it became the newspaper of the Central Committee of the Communist Party of the Soviet Union. The newspaper was awarded the Order of the Red Banner of Labor in 1979. In 1991 the name changed from "Soviet Culture" to "Culture".

Under the Soviet Union, the newspaper was referenced in many important papers and journals.

Elena Yampolskaya, a Russian journalist, writer and theatre critic, has been serving as chief editor since 2011.

Yuri P. Egorov recorded a documentary about the newspaper.

== Content ==
The newspaper markets itself to the intelligentsia. As the newspaper name suggests, it covers cultural events and developments within Russia, including theatre and cinema, visual arts, music, choreography, television and radio broadcasting, publishing and printing, cultural and educational institutions, folk crafts etc. The newspaper publishes reviews of artistic performances in Russia. For instance it has critical articles documenting theatrical and classical music performances, commenting on the performance of the artists and productions. The authors of newspaper articles are well-known journalists, writers, and notable cultural figures, such as Fazil Iskander, Valery Fokin, M. Zakharov {{Clarify}}, and others. More than 150 journalists work for the newspaper.
