= Leonid Nevedomsky =

Russian actor

Leonid Nevedomsky PAR
- Born: 13 October 1939; Vitebsk, Soviet Union
- Died: 3 June 2018 (aged 78); St. Petersburg, Russia
- Occupation: Actor
- Years active: 1956–2018

Leonid Vitalievich Nevedomsky (Russian: Леони́д Вита́льевич Неведо́мский; 13 October 1939 – 3 June 2018) was a Soviet and Russian actor. He appeared in more than 60 films and television shows between 1966 and 2007.

== Biography ==
Leonid Nevedomsky was born on 13 October 1939 in Vitebsk in the family of physicians Vitaly Iosifovich and Maria Markovna. He was named after a singer liked by his father, Leonid Utyosov. His elder brother, Leomark Vitalevich Nevyadomsky, Soviet coach in handball.

== Selected filmography ==
- Monologue (1972)
- Privalov's Millions (1972)
- Stepmom (1973)
- The Blue Bird (1976)
- Trust (1976)
- Khanuma (1978)
- Semyon Dezhnev (1983)
- Empire Under Attack (2000)
- Deadly Force (2001)
- Streets of Broken Lights (2002)
- Bandit Petersburg (2003)

== Nevedomsky on acting ==
Nevedomsky said: "I really need my hero to love — homeland, homeland, daughter, wife, brother, woman, just a man — forgive me, for Christ's sake, for such words. He must love and suffer."
