= Semyon Dezhnev (film) =

- Russian: Семён Дежнёв
- Directed by: Nikolai Gusarov
- Written by: Yaroslav Filippov
- Produced by: Vladimir Stamikov
- Starring: Aleksey Buldakov; Leonid Nevedomsky; Ivan Krasko
- Cinematography: Vladimir Makeranets
- Edited by: Raisa Stukova
- Music by: Aleksey Muravlyov
- Production company: Sverdlovsk Film Studio
- Release date: November 28, 1983
- Running time: 80 min.
- Country: Soviet Union
- Language: Russian

Semyon Dezhnev (Russian: Семён Дежнёв) is a 1983 Soviet biographical film directed by Nikolai Gusarov.

== Plot ==
The film tells about the Russian traveler Semyon Dezhnev, who discovered new Siberian lands, sailed from the Stone Belt to the east of the Eurasian continent and discovered the strait between Asia and North America.

== Cast ==
- Aleksey Buldakov as Semyon Dezhnev
- Leonid Nevedomsky as Mikhail Stadukhin
- Viktor Grigoryuk as Gerasim Ankudinov
- Oleg Korchikov as Fedot Popov
- Margarita Borisova as Abakayada
- Ivan Krasko as merchant Guselnikov
- Olga Sirina as Ovdotitsa
- Nikolai Gusarov as Timoshka
- Stepan Yemelyanov as Atamai
- Gennadi Yukhtin as Kotkin
- Bolot Beyshenaliyev as Sakhey
