= Stalin (Radzinsky book) =

1997 biography of Joseph Stalin

- Author: Edward Radzinsky
- Publication date: 1997
- ISBN: 9780385473972

Stalin, a 1997 biography by Edvard Radzinsky of Joseph Stalin, reflects the author's research in Russia's secret archives and consultation with living sources. Radzinsky was allowed to access some documents from the secret Soviet archives after the dissolution of the Soviet Union.

Radzinsky is a popular Russian playwright. He also wrote a bestselling history, The Last Czar: The Life and Death of Nicholas II (1992), and forty other popular histories, including others about the Russian Imperial family.

== Reception ==
Christopher Lehmann-Haupt of the New York Times describes this work as a dramatic, "bitterly condemnatory life of Stalin," based on Radzinsky's interviews and correspondence with numerous survivors of that era, as well as the author's research in newly opened and declassified Russian archives. Lehmann-Haupt compares this to the bitterly angry tone of Alexander Solzhenitsyn's The Gulag Archipelago. He believes that some conclusions by Radinsky were not sufficiently supported by evidence, such as his assertion that Stalin's second wife did not commit suicide, but was probably shot by Stalin. He did say that elements of Stalin's relationship with Lenin and his use of terrorism, as discussed by Radzinsky, "accorded" with preceding academic works, such as "Robert Conquest's Stalin: Breaker of Nations (1991) and by Mr. Radzinsky's predecessor into Soviet archives, Gen. Dmitri Volkogonov, in Stalin: Triumph and Tragedy (1991)."

The "Publishers Weekly" characterizes the book as "a vivid, astonishingly intimate biography of Joseph Stalin" based on previously unavailable primary-source documents of the communist party, the state and KGB.
