= Arithmetic of a Murder =

- Russian: Арифметика убийства
- Directed by: Dmitry Svetozarov
- Written by: Mikhail Popov; Dmitriy Svetozarov
- Produced by: Ada Staviskaya
- Starring: Sergey Bekhterev; Zinaida Sharko; Yury Kuznetsov; Lev Borisov; Olga Samoshina
- Cinematography: Sergey Astakhov
- Music by: Aleksandr Kutikov; Andrey Makarevich; Aleksandr Zajtsev
- Release date: 1991
- Country: Soviet Union
- Language: Russian

Arithmetic of a Murder (Russian: Арифметика убийства) is a 1991 Soviet detective film directed by Dmitry Svetozarov. In a communal apartment in St. Petersburg, a bully, whom everyone hated, was killed. Despite the fact that everyone had a motive for the murder, they all had an alibi. A local disabled person is trying to help the investigator solve the murder.

== Plot ==
In a dilapidated, rat-infested communal apartment in Saint Petersburg, a crime has been committed — Matvey Ivanovich Bryukhanov, a rowdy drunk and womanizer, is found murdered. The case is assigned to investigator Pyotr Prokofyevich Konev. During the investigation, Konev meets one of the apartment's long-time residents, Ilya Muromtsev, a disabled man who uses a wheelchair. Ilya is highly intelligent and observant, and he reveals secrets about the other residents. It soon becomes clear that nearly everyone in the apartment had a motive to kill Bryukhanov.

At one point, Ilya takes the lead in the investigation, even staging a reenactment of the fateful night’s events in a manner reminiscent of Hamlet. Alongside this live reenactment, he also stages a version using a paper puppet theater he crafted. Ilya's theory is enough to satisfy Konev’s superiors, but it leaves the true mystery unresolved.

== Cast ==
- Sergey Bekhterev
- Zinaida Sharko
- Yury Kuznetsov
- Lev Borisov
- Olga Samoshina
- Vladimir Kashpur
- Slava N. Jakovleff
