= Volodia Dubinin =

Russian partisan and Pioneer Hero of the Soviet Union

Volodia Dubinin (Russian: Володя Дубинин August 29, 1928 – January 4, 1942, in Kerch, Russian SFSR) was a Pioneer Hero of the Soviet Union.

== Life ==
His full name is Vladimir Nikiforovich Dubinin (in Russian: Владимир Никифорович Дубинин). Due to his young age, he was usually addressed by a short form of his name, "Volodia". He was born to Nikifor Semyonovich Dubinin and Yevdokia Timofeyevna Dubinina.

He was one of the group of Soviet partisans who went to live underground in an abandoned quarry near Kerch to resist German invasion during World War II, in the first period of what has come to be known as the Defense of the Adzhimushkay quarry. Since he used to play there as a little boy, his knowledge of the area, tunnels and exits was vast, and proved to be very useful for the resistance.

When Germans had withdrawn, Volodia shared in cleaning and rebuilding the city, including removal of land mines. On January 4, 1942, during demining a land mine left by the Germans exploded and took his life.

== Acknowledgements ==
After his death, he was granted the Order of the Red Banner.

The school he attended was renamed after him, and so was the street where he lived in Kerch. On it the Pioneers Square is located, where a monument to Volodia rises. It depicts him as coming out of the rock. These are the words written on it in Russian: "Hero Pioneer and Komsomol from Kerch. For heroism and courage displayed fighting against fascists invaders, Vladimir Dubinin was posthumously granted the Order of the Red Banner". The monument was unveiled on July 12, 1964.

A street named after him can also be found in each of the following cities: Podolsk and Petrodvorets.

In 1949, Soviet writers Lev Kassil and Max Polianovsky published his biography, entitled "Улица младшего сына" (The Youngest Son Street). In 1962, on May 21, a movie directed by Lev Golub based on that biography premiered under the same title.

A monument to Dubinin in Dnipro, Ukraine (which was located in a park named after him) was dismantled in December 2022 as part of the derussification and decommunization campaigns following the 2022 Russian invasion of Ukraine. The monument had been erected in 1981. In Kyiv the street named after him was renamed to Ray Bradbury street in May 2023.
