= Joys of the Youth =

- DVD cover
- Directed by: Yevgeni Gerasimov
- Screenplay by: Viktor Merezhko
- Starring: Stanislav Lyubshin; Marina Zudina; Aleksei Serebryakov
- Cinematography: Sergey Onufriyev
- Edited by: Natalia Gerinova
- Music by: Gennady Gladkov
- Production company: Gorky Film Studio
- Release date: December 29, 1987
- Running time: 81 minutes
- Country: Soviet Union
- Language: Russian

Joys of the Youth (Russian: Забавы молодых, romanized: Zabavy molodykh) is a 1987 Soviet drama film.

== Plot ==
In order to get a credit for physical education, which they skipped, the company of students of the technical school persuaded classmate (Zudina) to fall in love with the physical education teacher (Lyubshin) and persuade him.

The girl begins to hunt for an unapproachable bachelor teacher. Unexpectedly for all, he falls in love with a student. Moreover, the girl understands that she herself is not indifferent to the teacher. History, conceived as a rally, becomes a drama for its participants.

== Cast ==
- Stanislav Lyubshin as Anton Mikhailovich Gorshkov
- Marina Zudina as Svetlana Bobylyova
- Aleksei Serebryakov as Pan
- Natalia Nazarova as Marya Gavrilovna
- Valentina Telichkina as Nina Vasilievna
- Viktor Pavlov as Svetlana's father
- Vyacheslav Nevinny as Mylnikov

== Criticism ==
Director Yevgeny Gerasimov is not suspected of blind love for the younger generation. In the very title of his picture there is an ironic warning to those who are delighted with the youth looseness of the late eighties, and their own concern about the spiritual lack of spirituality of the younger generation.

Lyubshin played a physical education teacher so that you can fall in love with him. A really good picture, a love story in which problems and realities are depicted, but not an end in itself. A good love story is always interesting.
