= Georgy Tovstonogov =

Soviet theatre director

- Георгий Товстоногов
- Born: 28 September 1915; Tbilisi, Russian Empire
- Died: 23 May 1989 (aged 73); Leningrad, Russian SFSR, Soviet Union
- Resting place: Tikhvin Cemetery, St. Petersburg
- Occupation: Theatre director
- Years active: 1933–1989

Georgy Aleksandrovich Tovstonogov (Russian: Георгий Александрович Товстоногов; 28 September [O.S. 15 September] 1915 – 23 May 1989) was a Russian-Georgian theatre director.

He was the leader of the Gorky Bolshoi Drama Theater which was renamed after him in 1992.

== Biography ==
Georgy Tovstonogov was born in Tbilisi (now Georgia), or in St. Petersburg on 28 September 1915, to a Russian noble and a Georgian classical singer Tamara Papitashvili.

In 1938 he graduated from the State Institute of Theatrical Art in Moscow. From 1938 to 1946, he worked as a director in the Tbilisi Griboedov Theater, from 1946 to 1949 in the Central Children's Theater in Moscow, from 1950 to 1956 in the Leningrad Leninsky Komsomol Theater, and from 1956 until his death in 1989 in the Bolshoi Academic Gorky Theater. He was a professor at the Leningrad State Institute of Theatre, Music and Cinema since 1960. In 1957 he became a People's Artist of the USSR. He won the Stalin Prize thrice (1950, 1952, 1956), and got two Orders of Lenin and many other Soviet awards. In 1972, he produced the book The Profession of the Stage-Director, which is the best example of his directing style, and in which he shares his honest opinions on Lee Strasberg and Konstantin Stanislavsky. On 1985 the International Theatre Institute invited Tovstonogov to teach Stanislavski Method for international actors, Juan Furest from Spain and José Antonio Rodríguez from Cuba. On May 23, 1989, Tovstonogov died of heart attack in his car returning home after general rehearsal of his new production The Visit by Friedrich Dürrenmatt.

== Main works ==
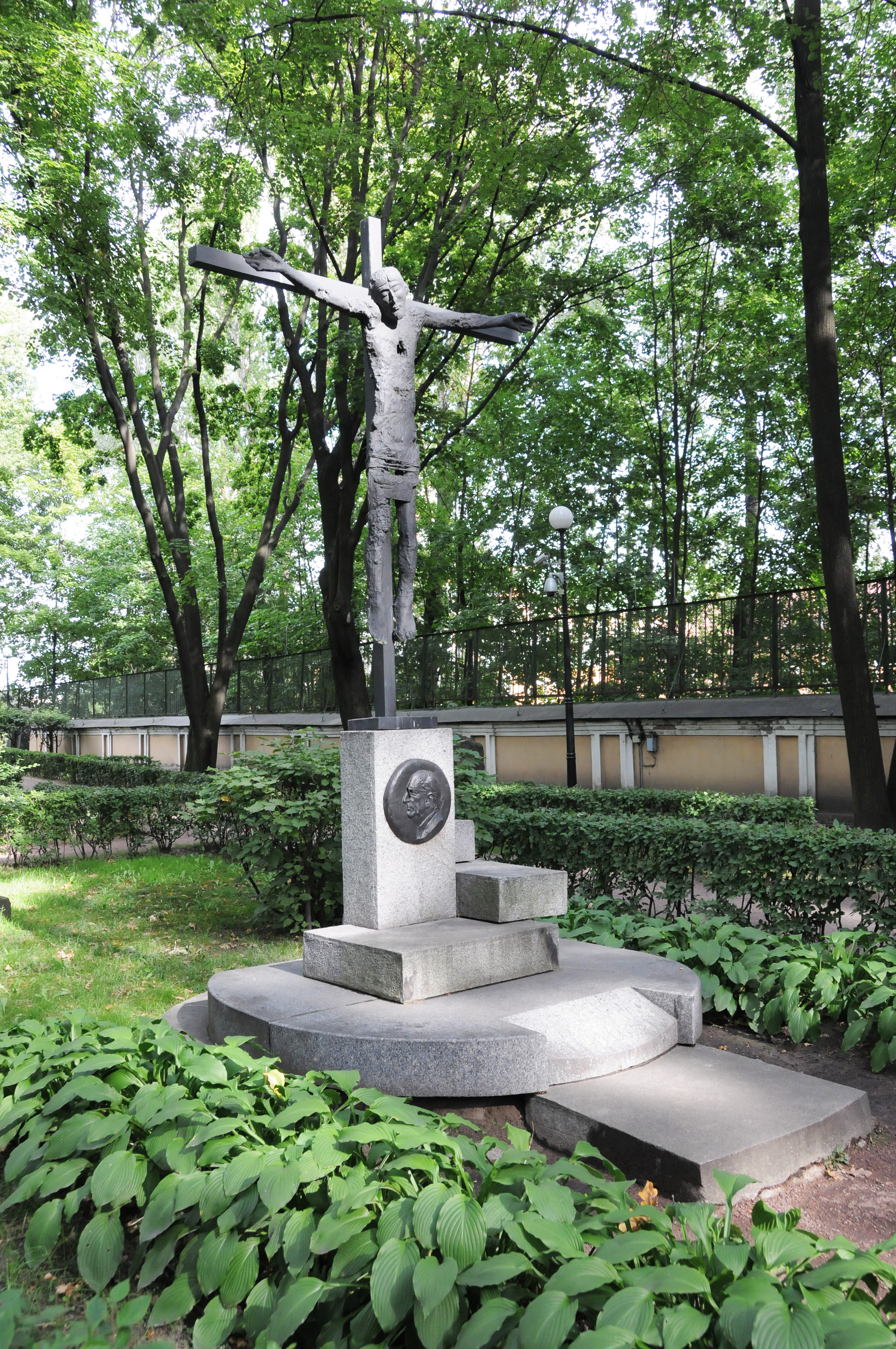
Monument to Tovstonogov on Tikhvin Cemetery in Saint Petersburg

Tovstonogov was the first who returned Fyodor Dostoevsky into Soviet theater, by his productions of The Insulted and Humiliated (1956 in Leningrad Leninsky Komsomol Theater) and The Idiot (1957 in Gorky Theater).

Among other famous performances are:

- The Three Sisters (1965) and Uncle Vanya (1982) by Anton Chekhov
- Five Evenings (1958) and My big sister (1961) by Alexander Volodin
- Irkusk Story by Aleksey Arbuzov (1960)
- Wit Works Woe (1962) by Alexander Griboedov
- Barbarians (1959) and Meschane (1966) by Maxim Gorky
- Once Again About Love (1964) by Edvard Radzinsky
- Henry IV, Part 1 (1969) by William Shakespeare
- Revisor by Nikolay Gogol (1972)
- Last Summer in Chulimsk by Alexander Vampilov (1974)
- Energetic People by Vasily Shukshin (1974)
- History of a Horse after Leo Tolstoy's Kholstomer (1975)

He was also responsible for producing mass spectacles.

During his prime Tovstonogov was considered one of the best theatre directors of Europe. The prominent members of his troupe include Alisa Freindlich, Zinaida Sharko, Lyudmila Makarova, Tatiana Doronina, Svetlana Kryuchkova, Kirill Lavrov, Innokenty Smoktunovsky, Pavel Luspekaev, Yefim Kopelyan, Sergey Yursky, Vladislav Strzhelchik, Yevgeni Lebedev, and Oleg Basilashvili. His contribution to the Russian tradition of theatre education is important, especially where it comes to education of theatre directors. His theories continue to have large influence, especially in Russian and Scandinavian theatre education.

== In film ==
- Demiurge (2008), documentary film directed by Tigran Mutafyan, featuring Tatiana Doronina, Aleksei German, Zinaida Sharko, Kama Ginkas, Genrietta Yanovskaya, Eduard Kochergin, Gennady Trostyanetsky, and Natella Tovstonogova

== Awards ==
- Stanislavsky State Prize of the RSFSR (1986)

== Legacy ==
- A minor planet was named after Tovstonogov.
