= Kholstomer =

Short story by Leo Tolstoy

"Kholstomer" (Russian: Холстомер, IPA: [xəlstɐˈmʲer]), also translated as "Strider", is a novella by Leo Tolstoy and the name of the horse from it. It has been referred to as "one of the most striking stories in Russian literature". It was started in 1863 and left unfinished until 1886, when it was reworked and published as "Kholstomer: The Story of a Horse". The story exploits the technique of defamiliarization by adopting the perspective of a horse to expose some of the irrationalities of human conventions.

Strider's altruistic life is recounted parallel to that of his selfish and useless owner. At the end of the story Strider dies but his corpse gives birth to a new life – that of wolf cubs:

At dawn, in a ravine of the old forest, down in an overgrown glade, big-headed wolf cubs were howling joyfully. A lean old wolf who was shedding her coat, dragging her full belly with its hanging dugs along the ground, came out of the bushes and sat down in front of the cubs. The cubs came and stood round her in a semi-circle. She went up to the smallest, and bending her knee and holding her muzzle down, made some convulsive movements, and opening her large sharp-toothed jaws disgorged a large piece of horseflesh. The little one, growling as if in anger, pulled the horseflesh under him and began to gorge. In the same way the mother wolf coughed up a piece for the second, the third, and all five of them, and then lay down in front of them to rest.

Georgy Tovstonogov staged it in his theatre in 1975 under the title The Story of a Horse. The horse was played by Yevgeni Lebedev.
