= Lyudmila Makarova =

Russian actress (1921–2014)

Lyudmila Makarova

Lyudmila Iosifovna Makarova (Russian: Людмила Иосифовна Макарова; 20 October 1921 – 30 May 2014) was a Russian stage actress from Saint Petersburg. From 1938 to 1941, she studied at the Greater Drama Theatre, becoming the theatre's lead actress under Georgy Tovstonogov. She is an best known for roles in performance and television film Khanuma.

In 1977, she was named a People's Artist of the USSR. Her on-screen appearances were rather brief. She was married to actor Yefim Kopelyan from 1941 until his death in 1975. Their son, Kirill Kopelyan (died 2005), was also an actor.
