= Georgy Natanson =

Soviet and Russian theater and cinema director, screenwriter and playwright

- Born: Georgy Grigorievich Nathanson; 23 May 1921; Kazan, Russian SFSR
- Died: 17 December 2017 (aged 96); Moscow, Russia
- Occupations: Director, screenwriter

Georgy Grigorievich Nathanson (Russian: Гео́ргий Григо́рьевич Натансо́н; 23 May 1921 – 17 December 2017) was a Soviet and Russian theater and cinema director, screenwriter and playwright. Worked as director at Mosfilm. People's Artist of Russia (1994), winner of the USSR State Prize (1977).

== Biography ==
Georgy Natanson was born on May 23, 1921, in Kazan. His mother was a singer, his father, Grigory Nathanson, was an economist and was killed in the army in 1941 at Yelnya.

Since 1941 to 1943 he worked as an assistant director of the Central United Film Studio (CUFS) in Alma-Ata, which was also evacuated in a film studio Mosfilm the Great Patriotic War. In 1944 he graduated from the VGIK in the studio of Lev Kuleshov and Anna Khokhlova. Diploma work - The Storm for the film's story by O. Henry. His career began at the studio Mosfilm in 1941 as an assistant director and later the second director of such classics of Russian cinema as Ivan Pyryev (Secretary of the Raikom and Six P.M.), Alexander Dovzhenko (Michurin), Aleksandr Ptushko (Sadko), Boris Barnet (Annushka), Andrey Tarkovsky (Ivan's Childhood).

In 1956, seeing the spectacle An Unusual Concert, Georgy Natanson already as auteur-director puts together with the Sergey Obraztsov satirical film Heavenly Creatures, marked by the Grand Prix at the International Film Festival in Venice. The following year, appears the film White Acacia based on the eponymous operetta of Isaak Dunayevsky. In 1960, screens out a shot with Anatoly Efros film Noisy Day on the play by Viktor Rozov, Finding Joy.

In subsequent years, one after another out films All Remains to People (1962), The Chamber (1964). Screening Older Sister based on the play by Alexander Volodin won universal acceptance (22.5 million viewers). This picture enjoyed the greatest success, and in the USSR Tatyana Doronina has been recognized as the best actress, of the year for a decade of Soviet films in Rome and Milan.

Next Natanson removes Once More About Love (1968), prize at the International Film Festival in Cartagena (Colombia), The Ambassador of the Soviet Union (1969), For All Responsible (1972), Re-Wedding (1975), They Were the Actors (1981), Elena Obraztsova Sings (1982), Valentin and Valentina (1985) the play by Mikhail Roshchin, Aelita, Do Not Pester Men! (1988) based on the play by Edvard Radzinsky, Frenzied Bus (1990). In the 1970s, he often worked as a theater director.

Natanson was also often invited to participate in the work of the juries of many domestic festivals and creative meetings.

== Death ==
Natanson died in Moscow on 17 December 2017, aged 96.

== Awards ==
- People's Artist of Russia (1994)
- Honored Artist of the RSFSR (1981)
- Order For Merit to the Fatherland (2007) 4th class - For outstanding contribution to the development of national cinema and many years of creative work
- Order of Honour (2002) for many years of fruitful work in the field of culture and art, a great contribution to strengthening friendship and cooperation between peoples
- Order of the Badge of Honour (1971)
- Medal For Valiant Labour in the Great Patriotic War 1941–1945
- USSR State Prize (1977)
- Golden Eagle Award (2004)
- Honorary Diploma of the VIII International Film Festival for Children and Youth Film in Venice (1956)
- Moscow Prize in literature and art (2003)
