= Lev Kassil =

Soviet writer

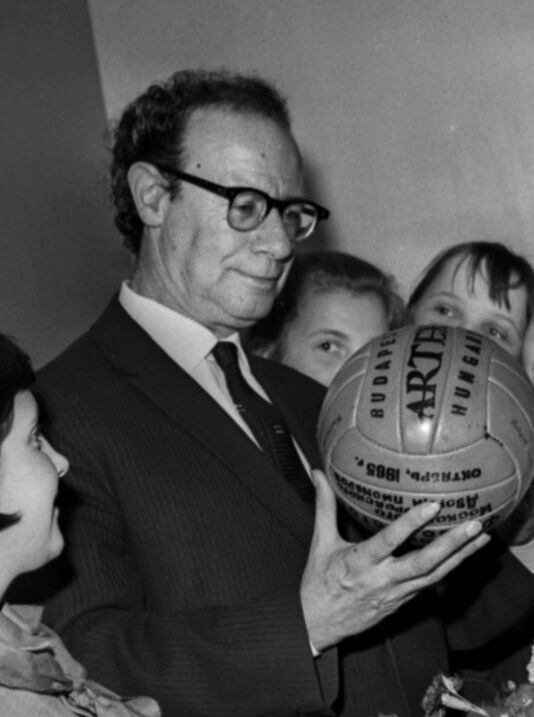
- Born: Lev Abramovich Kassil; July 10, 1905; Pokrovskaya Sloboda, Samara Governorate, Russian Empire
- Died: June 21, 1970 (aged 64); Moscow, Soviet Union
- Resting place: Novodevichy Cemetery

Lev Abramovich Kassil (Russian: Лев Абрамович Кассиль; 10 July 1905 – 21 June 1970) was an influential Soviet and Russian writer of juvenile and young adult literature and screenwriter, depicting Soviet life, teenagers, school, sports, culture, and war.

== Biography ==
He was born into a Jewish family in Pokrovskaya Sloboda (now Engels). He attended a local gymnasium that was later transformed into a Uniform Labour School. In 1923 Kassil entered Moscow State University, where he studied aerodynamics. He published his first short story in 1925, and eventually became a REF and LEF member. In 1927 Mayakovsky invited him to participate in the magazine called New LEF. His most important works were two autobiographical novels for young people dealing with student life before the Revolution, Konduit (The conduct book, 1929, tr. as The Black Book) and Shvambraniya (1931, tr. as The Land of Shvambrania); the two were revised and combined into one book called Konduit i Shvambraniya (1935, tr. as The Black Book and Shwambrania).

The film The Goalkeeper, written by Kassil, premiered in 1936.

His books were often "development novels", describing how young people could, despite their mistakes, reach a mature view of life. Modesty, unselfishness, endurance, and courage were virtues that Kassil held dear.

In 1950 he received the Stalin Prize for his book «Улица младшего сына» (1949, co-authored with M. Polyanovsky), the life story of young Volodia Dubinin and his struggle during the German invasion of the Soviet Union.

Kassil taught at the Maxim Gorky Literature Institute for an extended period of time. In 1965 he was elected as a member of the Academy of Pedagogical Science of the Soviet Union.

Kassil was married twice, first to Elena Iljinichna Kassil, with whom he had two children. Following their divorce, he married Swetlana Leonidovna Sobinova. They had one child. On June 21st, 1970, Kassil died in Moscow.

A minor planet, 2149 Schwambraniya, discovered in 1977 by Soviet astronomer Nikolai Chernykh, is named after the fictional land from his novel The Black Book and Schwambrania.

== Selected works ==
- The Black Book and Schwambrania (1930-1933) - Кондуит и Швамбрания
- The Great Opposition
- The Goalkeeper of the Republic (1939) - Вратарь республики
- Queen of Snows (1956)- Ход белой королевы
