= Zinaida Dekhtyaryova =

Ukrainian actress (1927–2004)

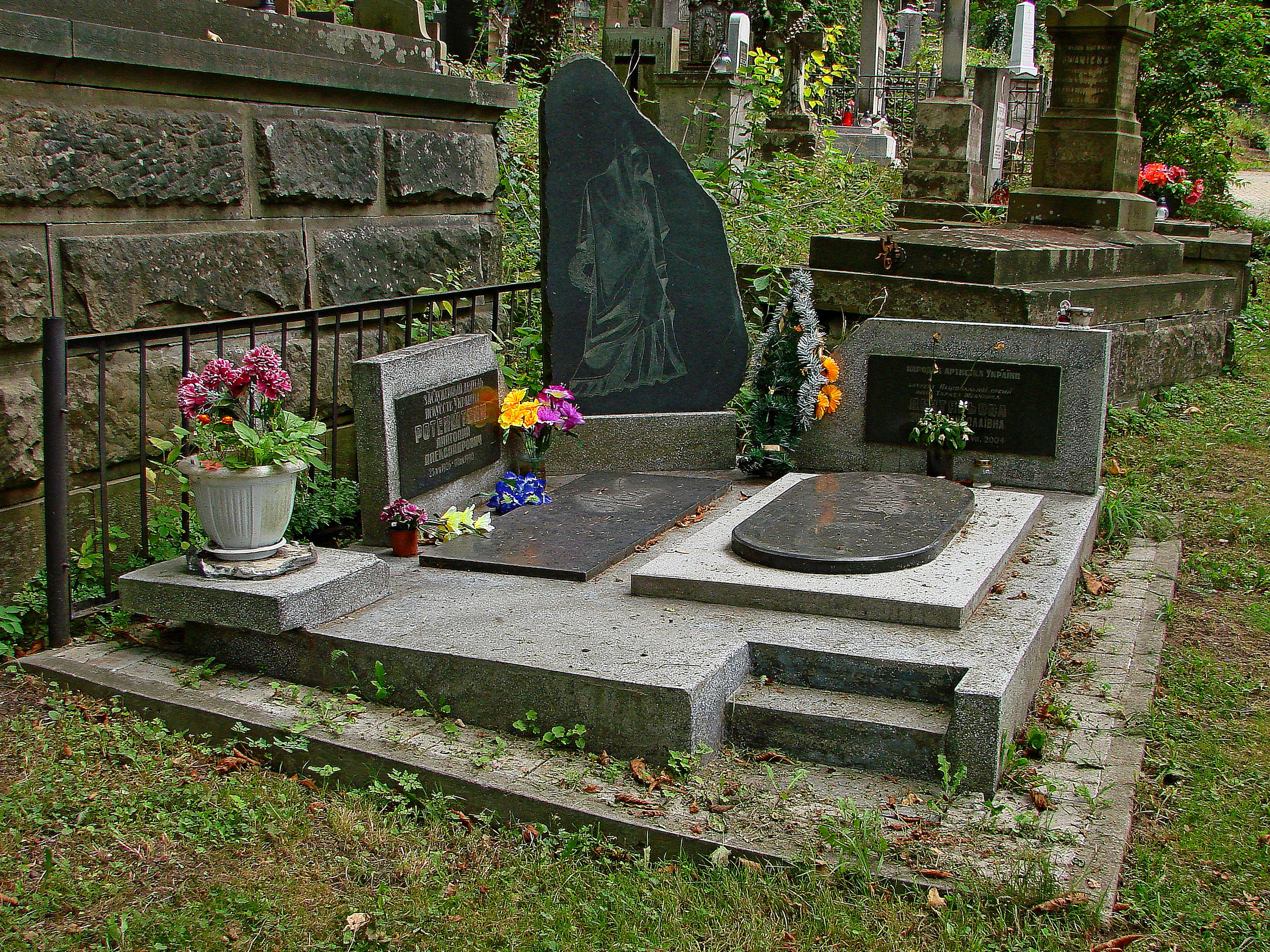
Graves of Z.Dekhtyaryova and her husband

Zinaida Mykolaivna Dekhtyaryova (30 October 1927 - 19 July 2004) was a Soviet and Ukrainian theater and film actress. People's Artist of the Ukrainian SSR (1968). Laureate of the Shevchenko National Prize (1996).

== Early life and education ==
In 1950, Zinaida Dekhtyaryova graduated from the Odessa Music School.

== Career ==
From 1950 to 1954, she was an actress at the Lviv Theater of Musical Comedy, and from 1954 to 2004, - at the Lviv Russian Drama Theater of the Carpathian Military District. In the cinema — Since 1959, she has been acting in films.

Dekhtyaryova died after a severe illness on 19 July 2004 at the age of 76. She was buried in Lviv on field 11 of the Lychakiv cemetery, next to her husband, Rotenstein Anatoly Oleksandrovich (1926-1990).

== Commemoration ==
On the 80th birthday of the actress in 2007, a documentary TV program, Zinaida Dekhtyaryova, was filmed on Lviv Television.

== Selected filmography ==
- Soldier (1959, Iryna Gayova);
- Yavdoha Pavlivna (1966, Yavdoha);
- Between the tall loaves (1970);
- For your fate (1972);
- Until the last minute (1973);
- Every day of life (1973);
- First flight, last flight (1974);
- The boys went to the front (1975);
- Memory of the Earth (1976);
- Soldiers (1977);
- Hippodrome (1980);
- What's around the corner? (1980);
- Why does a man need wings (1984);
- Danilo - Prince Halytskyi (1987);
- Sin (1991);
- TV series Crime with many unknowns (1993, Olympia Torska)

== Awards and honors ==
- People's Artist of the Ukrainian SSR (1968).
- The main prize for the best female role (film For your fate) at the All-Union Film Festival in Alma-Ata (1973).
- Laureate of the Shevchenko National Prize (1996) for playing the role of Countess Olympia Torska in the feature series Crime with Many Unknowns of the Ukrtelefilm studio.
