= Tatiana Doronina =

Russian actress (born 1933)

- Татьяна Доронина
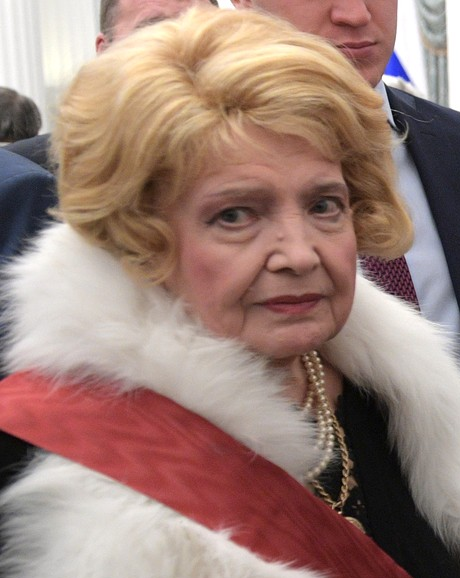
- Doronina in 2019
- Born: September 12, 1933 (age 92); Leningrad, Russian SFSR, Soviet Union
- Occupation: Actress

Tatiana Vasilyevna Doronina (Note: Russian: Татьяна Васильевна Доронина, romanized: Tatyana Vasilyevna Doronina) (born 12 September 1933) is a Russian actress who has performed in movies and the theater. She is generally regarded as one of the most talented actresses of her generation and was named a People's Artist of the USSR in 1981.

== Biography ==
Doronina was born in Leningrad (now St. Petersburg). After graduating the MKhAT school in Moscow, she returned to Leningrad and joined the Bolshoi Drama Theatre directed by Georgy Tovstonogov.

After moving to Moscow, Doronina worked at the Mayakovsky Theater and then at MKhAT. Her major roles were Arkadina in The Seagull by Chekhov, Dulcinea del Toboso in a play by Alexander Volodin, Queen Elizabeth of England and Mary Stuart in Vivat Regina.

The films she starred in, though few, are now considered Soviet classics. Many directors at the time believed she was too theatrical for film and refused to hire her. Georgy Natanson reversed that judgment by giving her the lead parts in Older Sister and Once More About Love. Both films had a significant success and made Doronina a noteworthy film star. Young women in the Soviet Union imitated her bouffant hair-do and her manner of speaking, and fans queued up for hours to get tickets. For her role for Once More about Love in which she played a flight attendant, she earned the Best Soviet Actress title in 1968 from the Soviet Screen. "Doronina's profoundly romantic heroines could sacrifice everything for love. She rendered the love theme the way no actress did. In almost every of her films she would sing a song, which in her presentation turned into a small drama", says Russian Cultural Navigator. In Three Poplars in Plyushcikha she plays a plain country woman who, although married, has never experienced love and puts the anguish tormenting her heart into a song called "Tenderness”.

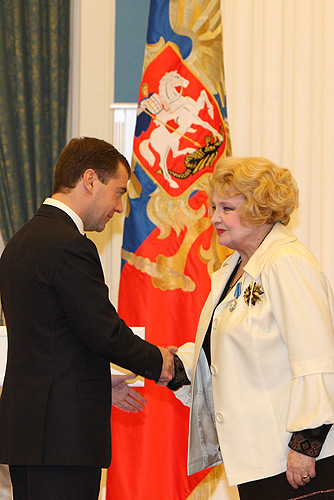
Tatiana Doronina with Dmitry Medvedev on October 15, 2008

At present, Doronina is artistic director of the Gorky MKhAT, a job she accepted when MKhAT split into two independent troupes.

Her former husbands include Edvard Radzinsky, a popular Russian writer and historian, and actors Oleg Basilashvili and Boris Khimichev.

== Selected filmography ==
Movies

- The First Echelon (1955) — Zoya
- Soldiers Were Walking (1958) — Christia
- Horizon (1961) — Klava, state farmer
- An Uninvented Story (1964) — Klava Baidakova
- Red Call (1965) — Nika
- Working Village (1965) — Polina
- Older Sister (1966) — Nadezhda, Lydia's older sister
- Three Poplars in Plyushcikha (1968) — Nyura (Anna Grigoryevna)
- Once More About Love (1968) — Natasha Alexandrova, flight attendant
- Wonderful Character (1970) — Nadezhda Kazakova, singer from Siberia
- Stepmom (1973) — Shura (Alexandra Nikolaevna) Olevantseva, Sveta's stepmother
- To a Clear Fire (1975) — Anna Lavrentievna Kasyanova
- Olga Sergeevna (1975) — Olga Sergeevna Vashkina, oceanologist
- Capel (1981) — Maria, painter in the construction team, Vitka's mother
- Valentin and Valentina (1985) — Mother of Valentina and Zhenya

Teleplays

- The Enchanted Wanderer (1963) — Gypsy Pear
- Twenty Years Later (1971) — Queen Anne
- Dowry (1974) — Larisa Ogudalova
- Well, the Audience! (1976) — Lady, Voldemar's fellow traveler
- BDT Thirty Years Later (1986) — Cleopatra Lvovna Mamaeva
- Live and Remember (1987) — Nastya (Based on the novel by V. Rasputin)

Documentaries

- Today is the Premiere (1965)
- Live, Think, Feel, Love... Georgy Tovstonogov (1988) (Made by"Lentelefilm")
- The Face (1988)
- Efim Kopelyan (1998) (From the series of TV programs of the ORT channel "To Remember")
- Boris Livanov (2003) (From the series of TV programs of the ORT channel "To Remember")
- The Appearance of the Master. Georgy Tovstonogov (2003) (TV channel “Russia-Culture”)
- Leonid Kharitonov. Sunny Boy (2004) (From the author's cycle by S. V. Ursulyak about the heroes of Soviet cinema)
- Boris Livanov (2005) (From the series of programs of the DTV channel "How the idols left")
- Drama by Ivan Brovkin (2006)
- Demiurge. Georgy Tovstonogov (2008) (TV channel “Russia. Culture”)
- Innokenty Smoktunovsky Against Prince Myshkin (2008)
- Georgy Natanson. In Love With Cinema (2010)
- My Son — Andrei Krasko (2010)
- The Main Role for Your Favorite Actress (2011)
- Stepmother (2015) (From the cycle "Secrets of our cinema" on the TV Center TV channel)

Voicing

- The Blue Bird (1970) — Fairy

== Honours and awards ==
- Order of Merit for the Fatherland;
  - 1st class (29 April 2019)
  - 2nd class (13 September 2013)
  - 3rd class (11 June 2003) - for outstanding contribution to the development of theatrical art
  - 4th class (23 October 1998) - for many years of fruitful work in the field of theatrical art, and in connection with the 100th anniversary of the Moscow Art Theatre
- Order of Honour (8 September 2008) - for outstanding contribution to the development of domestic theatrical and cinematic arts, many years of creative activity
- Order of Friendship of Peoples (20 June 1994) - for great achievements in the field of theatrical arts
- Tsarskoselskaya Art Prize (18 October 2011 - "For the grace and inspiration of the images in the theatre and film"
- People's Artist of USSR
- People's Artist of the RSFSR
- Merited Artist of the RSFSR
