= Tovstonogov Bolshoi Drama Theater =

Theatre in Saint Petersburg, Russia

Coordinates: 59°55′38″N 30°19′52″E

- Большой драматический театр имени Георгия Товстоногова
- BDT (БДТ); Gorky Bolshoi Drama Theater
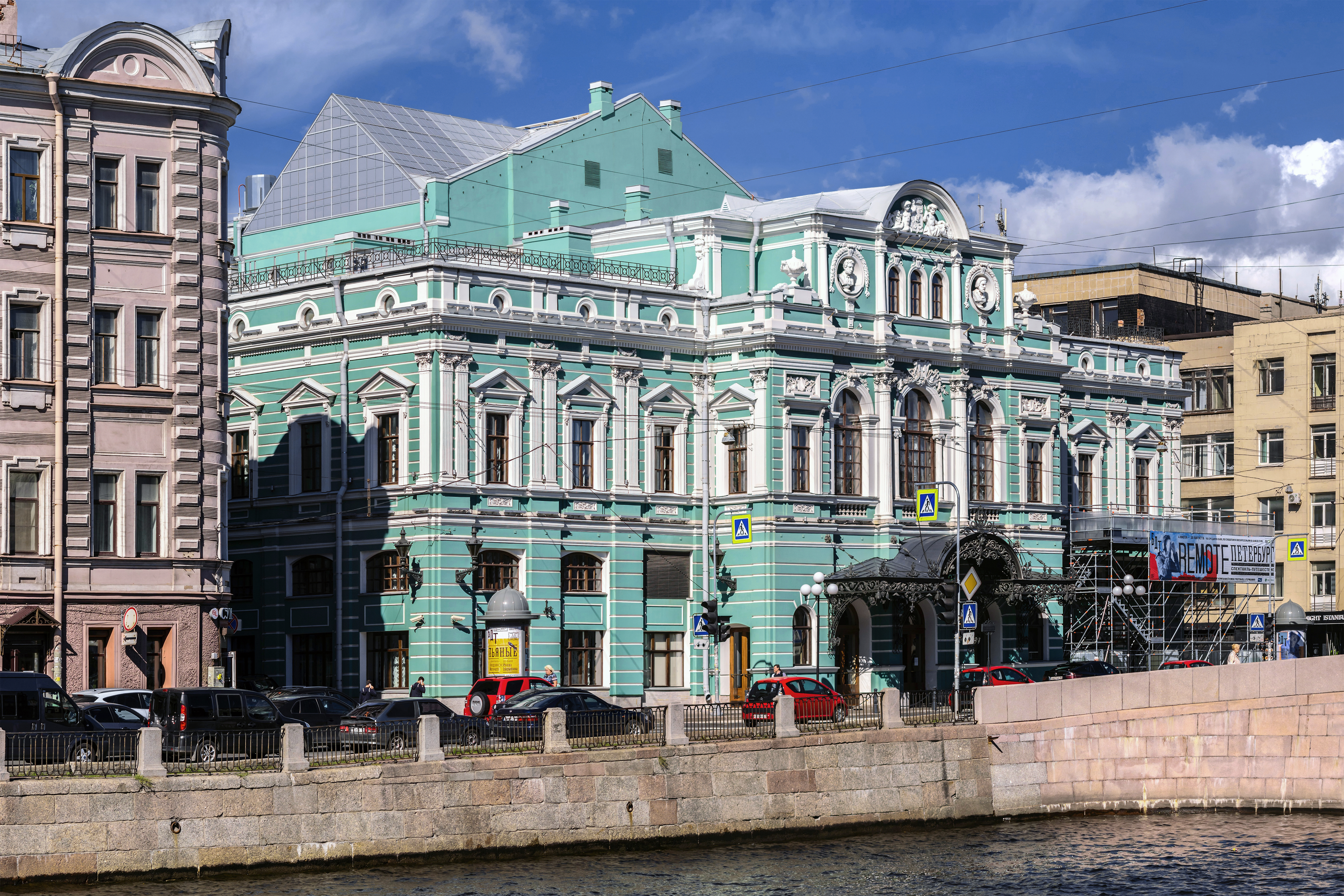
- The Bolshoi Drama Historic Stage, Fontanka Embankment, St. Petersburg
- Interactive map of Tovstonogov Bolshoi Drama Theater
- Address: Fontanka Embankment, 65; Saint Petersburg; Russia

Construction
- Opened: 1919

Website
- bdt.spb.ru

Tovstonogov Bolshoi Drama Theater (Russian: Большой драматический театр имени Г. А. Товстоногова; literally Tovstonogov Great Drama Theater), formerly known as Gorky Bolshoi Drama Theater (Russian: Большой Драматический Театр имени Горького) (1931–1992), often referred to as the Bolshoi Drama Theater and by the acronym BDT (Russian: БДТ), is a theater in Saint Petersburg, that is considered one of the best Russian theaters. The theater is named after its long-time director Georgy Tovstonogov. Andrey Moguchy was the artistic director of the theater from 2013 to 2023.

The theater is also encountered in literature as the Great Drama Theater or Great Dramatic Theater of Leningrad.

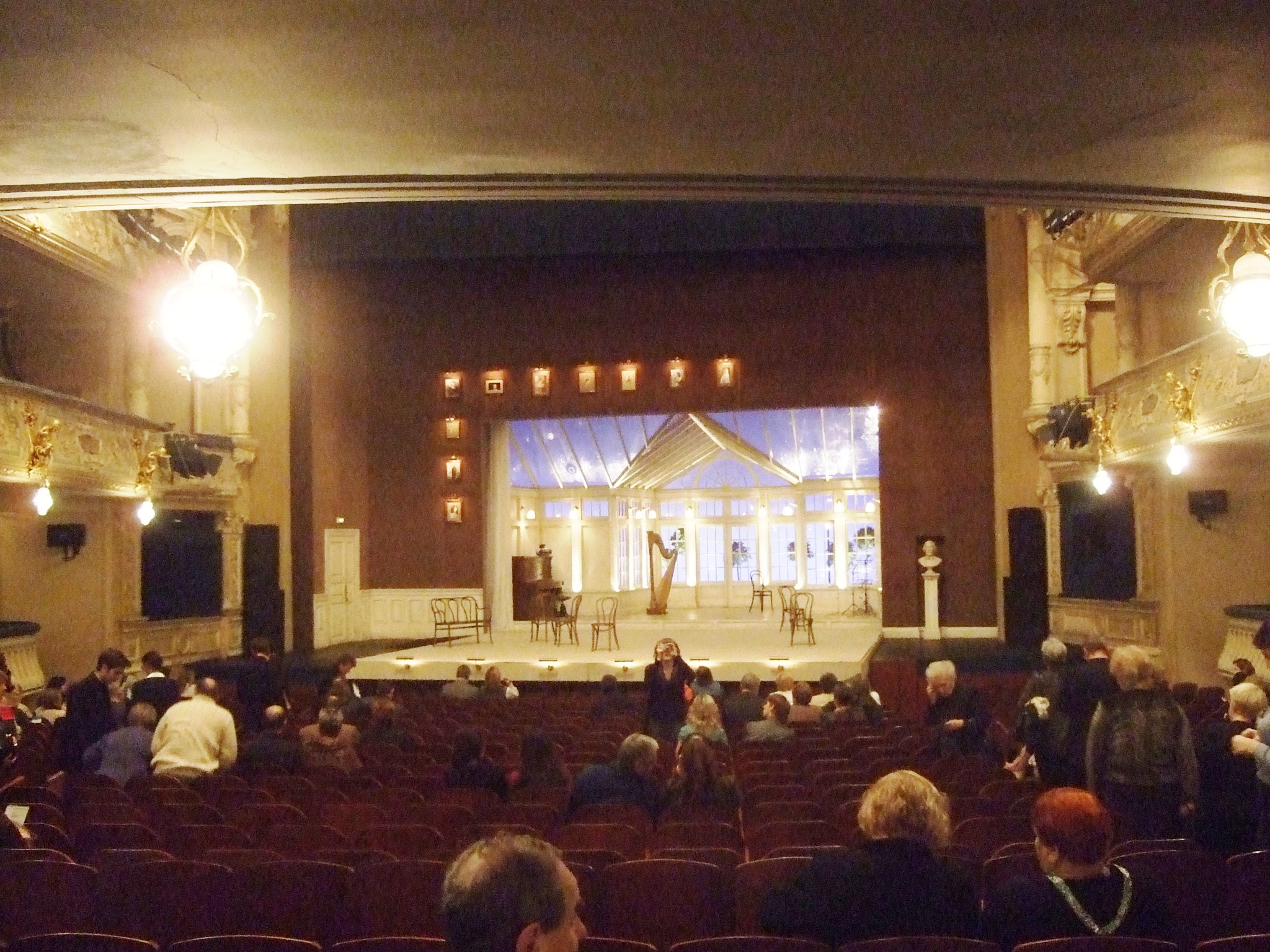
The main scene and auditorium of BDT (before a performance of Quartet by Ronald Harwood)

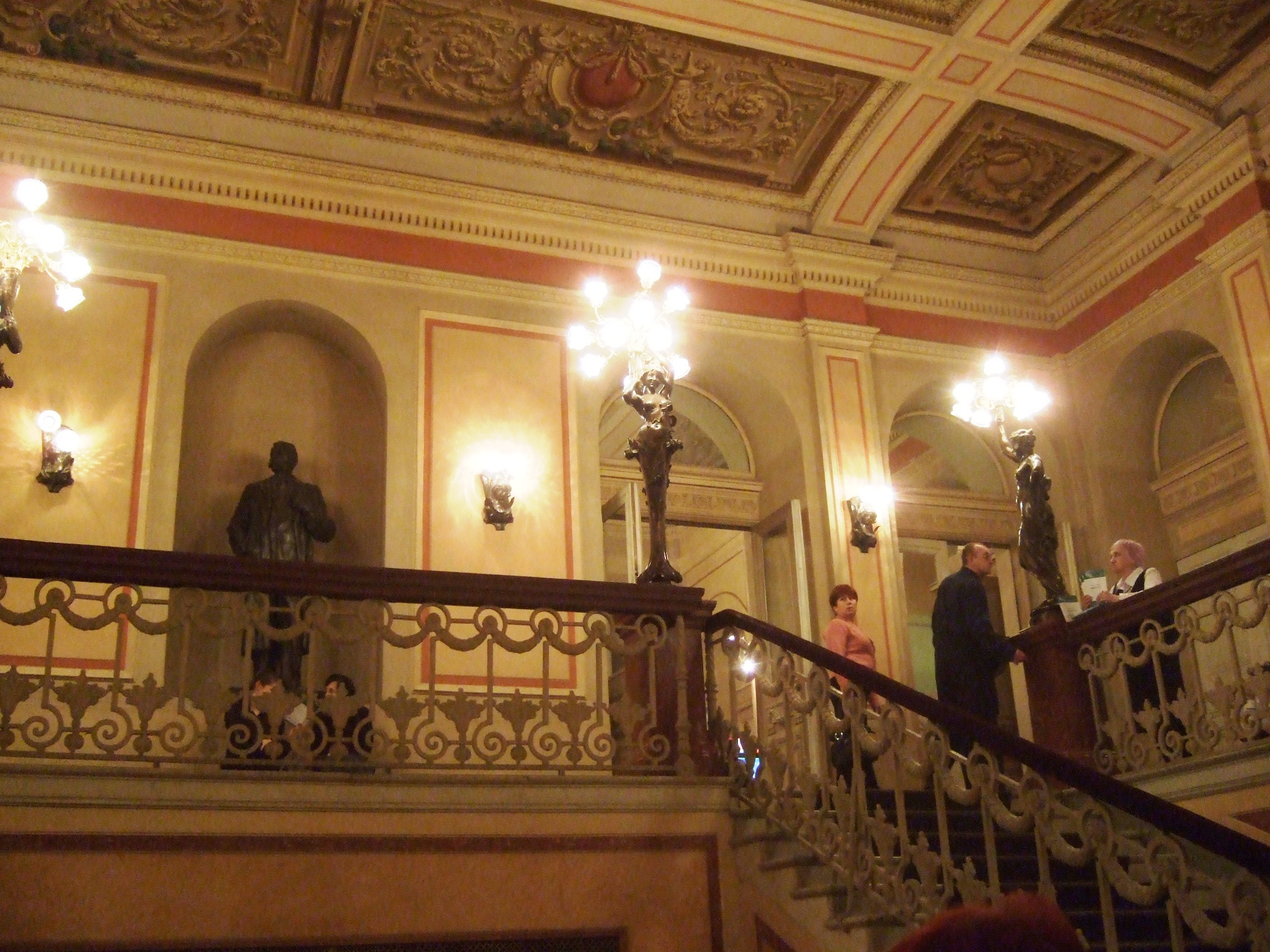
Entrance to the theater

== Background ==
The main people behind the establishment of the theater were Maxim Gorky, Maria Andreyeva, Alexander Blok and Anatoly Lunacharsky.

Already by 1914, before the October Revolution, actress Maria Andreeva—common law wife of Gorky from 1903 and Commissar for Theaters and Public Spectacles in Petrograd from 1918 to 1921—had participated in a theater initiative, including actor Yury Yuryev, with the aim of returning to the "classics". In 1918 Yuryev staged some works in Leningrad.

Gorky, Blok, Adreeva and Lunacharsky—who was People's Commissar of Enlightenment after the revolution—had similarly worked towards the aim of staging the classics for the masses. Eventually they merged with Andreeva's other endeavor.

In January 1919, the government sponsored the staging of Nikolai Gogol's The Government Inspector.

== Early years ==
The theater was organized in 1918 by the order of Maria Andreeva. The original name of the theater was Osobaya Drammaticheskaya Truppa (Special Drama Company). The theater was organized by merging the Theater of Tragedy led by Yury Yuryev and the Theater of Art Drama led by Andrey Lavrentyev.

During the first year of its operation the theater performed on the stage of the Great Hall of the Petrograd Conservatory. The chief director of the theater was Andrey Lavrentyev and the chairman was Alexander Blok. The first performance of the new theater was Friedrich Schiller's Don Carlos on 15 February 1919. In 1920 the theater moved to the building, at 65 Fontanka Embankment, of the former Suvorin Theatre also known as Maly Imperial Drama Theater.

The main actors of that period were Yury Yuryev and Nikolay Monakhov. Many brilliant painters worked for the theater including Alexandre Benois, Mstislav Dobuzhinsky, Vladimir Shuko, Nikolay Akimov; among the composers working with the theater were Boris Asafiev and Yuri Shaporin. The theater produced mostly classical romantic dramas like Don Carlos (1919), Othello (1920), King Lear (1920), Twelfth Night (1921), Ruy Blas (1921), The Robbers (1919), and Le Médecin malgré lui (1921). Since the mid-1920s the theater added to its repertoire plays of German expressionists including Gas by Georg Kaiser, Virgin Forest by Ernst Toller, and, influenced by expressionism, Machine Mutiny (Bunt Mashin) by Alexey Tolstoy.

== Konstantin Tverskoy (1927–1935) ==
The main director of that period was Konstantin Tverskoy (real name Konstantin Konstantinovich Kuzmin-Karavayev; officially the artistic director in 1929–1935). The theater was producing mainly spectacles of Soviet dramaturges, including Boris Lavrenev (Razlom, 1927), Vladimir Kirshon (Gorod Vetrov, 1928); Yury Olesha (Zagovor chuvstv, 1929), Nikolai Pogodin (Moy drug, 1932).

Very important were performances of Maxim Gorky plays including Yegor Bulychev and the others (1932) and Dostigaeyev and others (1933). In 1932 the theater was named in honor of Maxim Gorky. The theater was known as Gorky Bolshoi Drama Theater (Bolshoi Dramaticheskiy Teatr imeni Gor'kogo) until 1992, when it was renamed after Georgy Tovstonogov.

== Difficult years (1935–1956) ==
The years after Tverskoy are considered to be a crisis for the theater. The leaders of the theater frequently changed, the level of performances lowered and the numbers of theater-goes dramatically decreased.

The artistic directors (khudozhetvenniy rukovoditel) of that period were:

- V.F. Fyodorov – 1935–1936;
- Aleksei Dikiy – 1936–1937;
- Boris Babochkin – 1938–1940;
- L.S. Rudnik – 1940–1944;
- N.S. Rashevskaya – 1946–1950;
- I.S. Yefremov – 1951–1952;
- O.G. Kaziko – 1952–1954;
- K.P. Khokhlov – 1954–1955.

During World War II the theater was evacuated to Kirov, Kirov Oblast. In 1943 in the last days of the Siege of Leningrad the theater returned to serve the troops of Leningrad Front and the military hospitals.

== Georgy Tovstonogov (1956–1989) ==
Georgy Tovstonogov was the artistic director of the theater since 1956 until his death in 1989. During his prime Tovstonogov was considered one of the best theater directors of Europe and the theater was one of the best in the Soviet Union.

Tovstonogov was the first who returned Fyodor Dostoyevsky into Soviet theater, by his productions of The Idiot (1957).

Among other famous performances are:

- The Three Sisters (1965) and Uncle Vanya (1982) by Anton Chekhov
- Five evenings (1958) and My big sister (1961) by Alexander Volodin
- Irkusk Story by A. N. Arbuzov 1960
- Wit Works Woe (1962) by Alexander Griboedov
- Barbarians (1959) and Meschane (1966) by Maxim Gorky
- Once again about Love (1964) by Edvard Radzinsky
- Henry IV, Part 1 (1969) by William Shakespeare
- The Government Inspector by Nikolay Gogol (1972)
- Last summer in Chulimsk by Alexander Vampilov (1974)
- Energetic people by Vasily Shukshin (1974)
- History of a Horse after Leo Tolstoy's Kholstomer (1975)

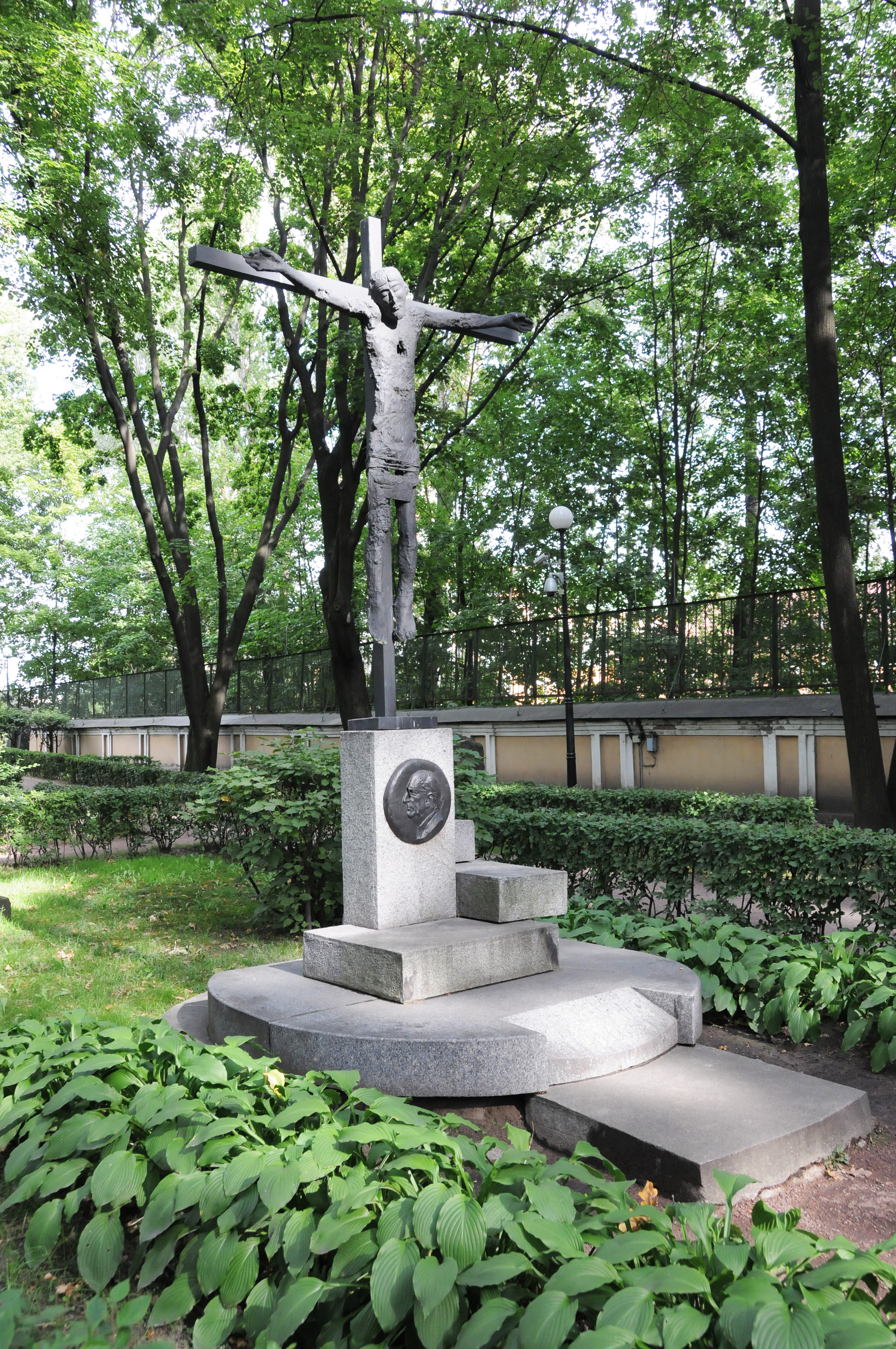
Tovstonogov's grave

The prominent members of his troupe included Alisa Freindlich, Zinaida Sharko, Lyudmila Makarova, Tatiana Doronina, Svetlana Kryuchkova, Kirill Lavrov, Innokenty Smoktunovsky, Pavel Luspekaev, Yefim Kopelyan, Sergey Yursky, Vladislav Strzhelchik, Evgeny Lebedev, and Oleg Basilashvili.

== After Tovstonogov ==
In 1989, a prominent actor of the theater, Kirill Lavrov was unanimously elected the artistic director. He managed to preserve the artistic tradition established by Tovstonogov, and to rename BDT after Tovstonogov in 1993.

Lavrov did not act as a theatrical director. Many spectacles of the period were directed by Temur Chkheidze. Among them were Intrigue and Love by Friedrich Schiller (1990), Macbeth by William Shakespeare (1995), Antigone by Jean Anouilh (1996), and Boris Godunov by Alexander Pushkin (1998).

In 2005, Kamenny Island Theatre became a new stage of the Bolshoi Drama.

On 27 April 2007, Kirill Lavrov died and Temur Chkheidze was elected as the artistic director of BDT. Under Chkheidze, the theatre continued its classical tradition, while some observers noted signs of artistic stagnation, as the theatre was trying to prolong Tovstonogov aesthetics, while the master has long died. Temur Chkheidze has announced that his resignation 'opens the door for a change at the theatre' he does not feel capable of introducing himself.

On 29 March 2013, Andrey Moguchy was appointed artistic director. Moguchy has indicated that his intention is to revitalize the theatre's creative energy, and to attract younger audience. New artistic direction has enabled the theatre to double its attendance figures in 2016 as compared to 2013.
