= Zinaida Sharko =

- Born: Zinaida Maximovna Sharko; 14 May 1929; Rostov, USSR
- Died: 4 August 2016 (aged 87); Saint Petersburg, Russia
- Occupation(s): Stage and film actress
- Spouses: Igor Vladimirov (m. 1953–1960) Sergei Yursky (m. 1961–1968)

Zinaida Maximovna Sharko (Russian: Зинаида Максимовна Шарко; 14 May 1929 – 4 August 2016) was a Russian actress of theatre and film. She was a member of Bolshoi Drama Theatre, and was awarded People's Artist of the RSFSR in 1980.

== Biography ==
After the start of World War II she took part in concerts for the wounded in the hospitals, with a children's song and dance ensemble. For these concerts, a total of 900, she was awarded the medal For valorous work in the Great Patriotic War, which always considered later would call the most expensive of its awards.

In 1951 she graduated from the Leningrad Theatrical Institute. While studying, in 1950–1951 she performed with the Leningrad regional theater, and after graduation worked at the Lenconcert Theatre (1951–1952) and at the Lensovet Theatre (1952–1956). After 1956 she had a six-decade-long career with the Tovstonogov Bolshoi Drama Theater.

== Death ==
She died on 4 August 2016 at the age of 87.

== Selected filmography ==
- Old Khottabych (1956) as ice cream seller
- The Long Farewell (1971) as Yegenia Vasilievna Ustinova
- Day of Admittance on Personal Matters (1974) as Sofia Mikhailovna
- Other People's Letters (1975) as Angelina Grigoryevna Egorova
- Retired Colonel (1975) as Anastasia Petrovna
- Always with Me (1976) as Nina Romanovna
- Jump from the Roof (1977) as Ksyusha's grandmother, neighbor
- The Nose (1977) as Staff Officer Podtochina
- Random Passenger (1978) as Kamelia Nikolaevna
- The Dog in the Manger (1978) as Anarda
- Autumn Story (1979) as Nadezhda Romanovna, inspector of the City Department of Education
- Sergey Ivanovich Retires (1980) as Ksenia
- Space for Maneuver (1982) as Anna Arkadievna
- Formula of Memory (1982) as Vera Alekseevna Svetlova
- Unique (1983) as Pavlik's Mother
- I Remember You (1985) as Asya, mother of Kim and Marat
- Flight of the Bird (1988) as Iraida Stepanovna
- Short Game (1990) as Valera Dyakov's mother
- Arithmetic of a Murder (1991) as Varvara Petrovna
- Rin. The Legend of the Icon (1992) as Apollonia, abbess
- The Circus Burned Down, and the Clowns Have Gone (1998) as Zoya Vasilievna
- Composition for Victory Day (1998) as Nina
- National Security Agent (1999) as Lyudmila Grigoryevna Petrashkul
- Bandit Petersburg 2 (2000) as Dusya
- The Garden Was Full of Moon (2000) as Vera Andreevna
- Mechanical Suite (2001) as Plyuganovsky's mother
- Theatrical Novel (2003) as Nastasya Ivanovna Koldybaeva
- Russian Amazons 2 (2003) as Olga Sergeevna
- Lines of Fate (2003) as Nyura
- Bad Habit (2004) as aunt Klava
- The Bet (2005) as Tatyana Alekseevna Kuzina
- Dunechka (2005) as Dunechka's grandmother
- Sonya With Golden Hands (2007) as Manka Portovaya
- Dealer (2009) as Efrosinya Semyonovna
- Behind Kefir (2013) as old woman
