= Edvard Radzinsky =

Russian historian

- Эдвард Радзинский
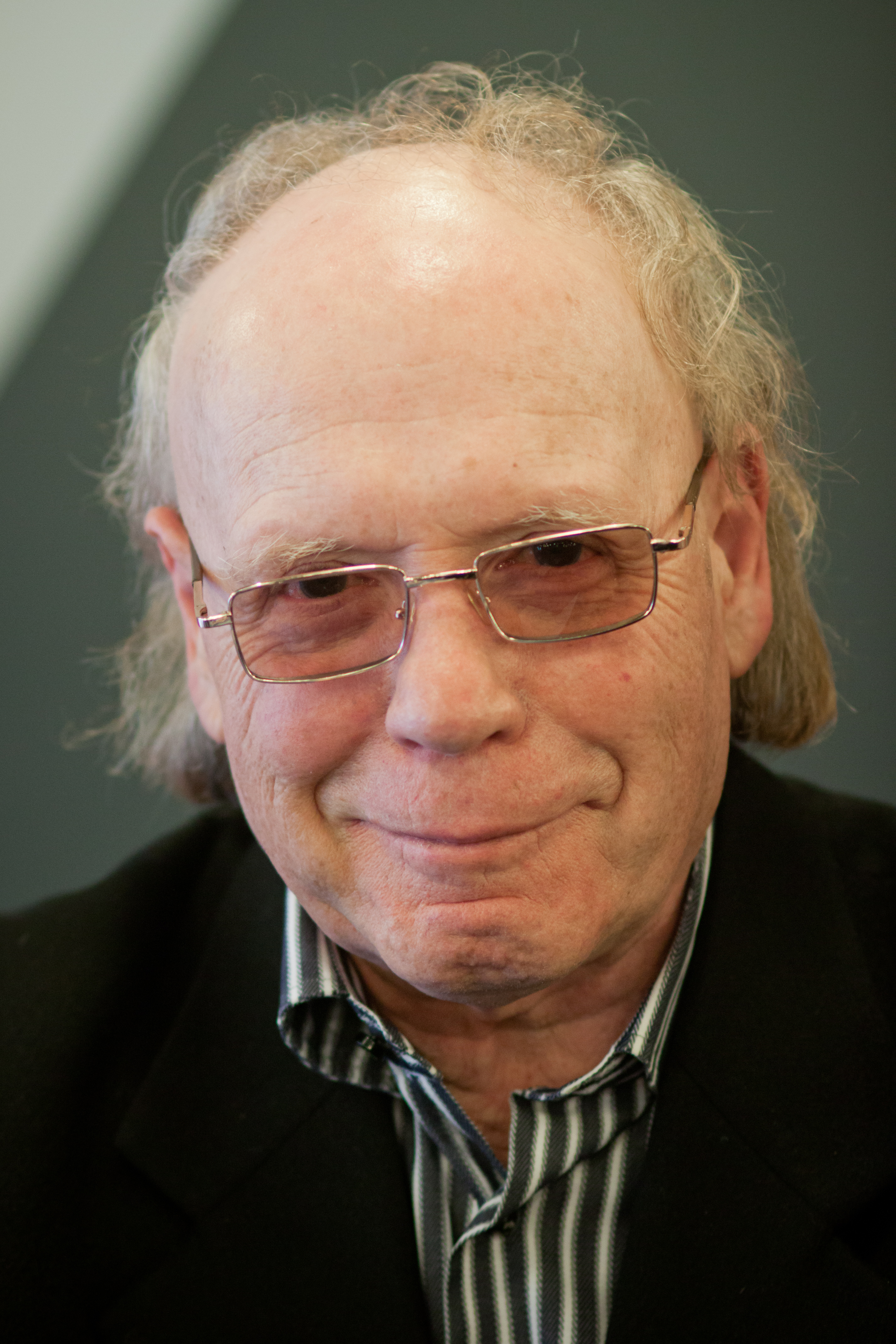
- Radzinsky in 2013
- Born: 23 September 1936 (age 90); Moscow, Soviet Union
- Citizenship: Russia
- Education: Moscow Archive Institute
- Occupations: Historian, playwright, novelist, screenwriter and TV presenter
- Spouse: Tatiana Doronina
- Awards: Order "For Merit to the Fatherland"

Edvard Stanislavovich Radzinsky (Russian: Э́двард Станисла́вович Радзи́нский; born 23 September 1936) is a Russian historian, playwright, television personality, and screenwriter. He authored more than forty history books that are popular in Russia.

== Biography ==
Edvard Stanislavovich Radzinsky was born in Moscow, Russia, on 23 September 1936 to playwright Stanislav Radzinsky and his wife Sofia. He studied in the Moscow Archive Institute and is a trained historian.

In 1955 Radzinsky married actress Alla Geraskina, a daughter of popular Soviet playwright and writer Lia Geraskina. Their son Oleg was born in 1958. Radzinsky divorced Alla in 1964.

He then married Tatiana Doronina, one of the leading Soviet actresses of the 60s-70s. They divorced later. He is married to actress Elena Denisova.

=== Career ===
Radzinsky became a writer of popular non-fiction books on historical subjects, publishing more than forty. He has specialized in books about figures and times of Russian history. Since the 1990s, he has written the series Mysteries of History. Books translated into English include his biographies of Tsars Nicholas II and Alexander II, Rasputin, and Joseph Stalin.

His book Stalin: The First In-depth Biography Based on Explosive New Documents from Russia's Secret Archives (1997) was based on research in Russian and Soviet archives made newly available after 1991. He explored numerous controversies about Joseph Stalin, including the existence of a fuller text of Lenin's Testament, the alleged involvement of Stalin as an agent of the Tsarist secret police, and the role of Stalin in the death of his wife and the murder of Sergey Kirov. In the book Radzinsky drew on documents from the archives to support the finding that Soviet command had plans for a preemptive strike against Nazi Germany in 1941.

According to the book, Stalin was poisoned by order of Lavrentiy Beria. His book includes an interview with a former bodyguard of Stalin, who stated that on the night of Stalin's death, the bodyguards were relieved of duty by an NKVD officer named Khrustalev. This same officer was briefly mentioned in Memories, the memoir of Stalin's daughter Svetlana Alliluyeva.

== Books ==
=== English ===
- Stalin: The First In-depth Biography Based on Explosive New Documents from Russia's Secret Archives, Anchor, (1997) ISBN 0-385-47954-9
- The Last Tsar : The Life and Death of Nicholas II, 1993, Anchor, ISBN 0-385-46962-4, (2005) ISBN 0-7432-7332-X
- Alexander II: The Last Great Tsar (2005) ISBN 0-7432-7332-X
- Tsar : The Lost World of Nicholas and Alexandra ISBN 0-316-55788-9
- The Rasputin File (2001, Anchor, US) ISBN 0-385-48910-2
- Rasputin: The Last Word (2001, Allen & Unwin, Australia) ISBN 1-86508-529-4

=== Russian ===
- «Ипатьевская ночь» © AST, 2007 г.
- «На Руси от ума одно горе» © AST, 2006 г.
- «Начало театрального романа»: Сборник пьес © Издательство «ВАГРИУС», 2004 г.
- Собрание сочинений (в восьми томах) © Издательство «ВАГРИУС», 1998—2003 г.
- «Загадки жизни и смерти». Подарочное издание © Издательство «ВАГРИУС», 2003 г.
- «Княжна Тараканова» © Издательство «ВАГРИУС», 2003 г.
- «Загадки истории». Подарочное издание © Издательство «ВАГРИУС», 2002 г.
- Napoleon: life after death «Наполеон: жизнь после смерти» © Издательство «ВАГРИУС», 2002 г.
- «Игры писателей» © Издательство «ВАГРИУС», 2001 г.
- «Загадки любви» © Издательство «ВАГРИУС», 1999, 2000 гг.
- «Загадки истории» © Издательство «ВАГРИУС», 1999, 2000 гг.
- «Кровь и призраки русской смуты» © Издательство «ВАГРИУС», 1998, 2000 гг.
- «Гибель галантного века» © Издательство «ВАГРИУС», 1999 г.
- «…и сделалась кровь» © Издательство «ВАГРИУС», 1998 г.
- «Властители дум» © Издательство «ВАГРИУС», 1999 г.
- «Театр» © Издательство «Искусство», 1986 г.
- Conversations with Socrates «Беседы с Сократом» © Издательство «Советский писатель», 1982 г.
