= Vladimir Vysotsky filmography =

During his years in cinematography, Vladimir Vysotsky appeared in more than twenty-five films. He made his film debut in 1958 while studying at the Moscow Art Theater School, when he played an episodic role of a student called Petya in the film "Female Age-Mates". Vysotsky's early filmography was dominated by characters in whose images he appeared briefly on the screen, uttering a few lines. In the 60's directors, inviting Vysotsky to the film, sometimes used his singing potential more actively than dramatic possibilities. The first film work, which changed the "episodic" role of Vysotsky, was the role of the tank driver Volodya in the film of the Belarusian director Viktor Turov "I come from childhood". Widespread fame actor brought participation in the movie "Vertical". In both films for the first time sounded from the screen songs Vysotsky; songs from "Vertical", which gave the action dynamics and sharpness, became a kind of mountaineering folklore and were highly appreciated by the public and critics. The presence of Vysotsky in the picture could be the reason why the movie was screened in limited numbers or not at all. This was the case with Kira Muratova's"Brief Encounters" (1966), which the public saw only in 1987.

In 1968, the actor created the images of the White Guard lieutenant Brusentsov ("Two Comrades Were Serving", directed by Yevgeny Karelov) and the revolutionary underground Brodsky ("Intervention", directed by Gennadi Poloka). In an effort to break the stereotype of antihero and hero in these films, Vysotsky showed the figure of the White Guard Brusentsov so vividly that his portrait came to the fore and required cuts, and the role of the revolutionary was resolved "epathetically", which served as one of the reasons for the film's ban at the box office. In Vysotsky's cinematic career, he used to play ambiguous or negative characters; among them - the criminal Ryaboy ("Master of the Taiga"), the occasional policeman at a wedding ( "War Under Roofs"), maximalist Von Koren ("The Bad Good Man"), a man with a "stalled conscience" He in the film "The Fourth", "shabby seducer" Boris Ilyich ( "The One and Only..."). The actor also had positive characters: revolutionary underground Nikolai Kovalenko (Georges Bengalsky) in the adventurous "Dangerous Tour", a prisoner of war Solodov ("The Only Road"), Ibrahim Hannibal ("How Czar Peter the Great Married Off His Moor"). Vysotsky's last acting work was participation in television films: he played the role of Gleb Zheglov in "The Meeting Place Cannot Be Changed" (directed by Stanislav Govorukhin, premiere November 11, 1979) and Don Juan in "Little Tragedies" (directed by Mikhail Schweitzer, premiere February 29, 1980). In 1987, Vysotsky was posthumously awarded the USSR State Prize "for the creation of the image of Gleb Zheglov in "The Meeting Place Cannot Be Changed" and the author's performance of songs".

Vysotsky acted not only in films, but also in television plays and did voice-over work: his voice can be heard in cartoons and in the documentary "Ilf and Petrov". As an author, he wrote more than a hundred and thirty songs for films, including "Brotherly Graves", "Song about a Friend", "Brodsky's Song", "House of Crystal", "Couplets of Bengal", "Ballad of Love", "Interrupted Flight" and others. A considerable part of the works he wrote for the cinema were rejected by the studio's art councils at the stage of preparation or removed from the film during the commissioning or editing.

Vysotsky was not able to realize his plans related to scriptwriting. The scripts he wrote (alone or as a co-author) were not accepted for production. The only exception was a joint script with Igor Shevtsov for the film "Green Van", which was actually accepted (subject to revision) by the Odessa Film Studio in 1980; however, this project remained unrealized. Since the second half of the 1960s, Vysotsky's appearance on the screen was always accompanied by press coverage; in 1975, the Iskusstvo Publishing House published the book Actors of the Soviet Cinema with an article by Irina Rubanova entitled Vladimir Vysotsky, which became the most complete lifetime study of the artist's cinematic work.

== Vladimir Vysotsky and cinematography ==
In 1976, Vladimir Vysotsky, in response to a question from a correspondent of the Bulgarian newspaper "Druzhba," talked about how he would set his priorities if he were to go back to the beginning of his creative path. Their order -in terms of importance- was as follows: "Perhaps in this new life I would mainly write. From time to time I would be asked to play on stage. I'd sing a little for friends. Well, and probably I would be filmed, if there were interesting roles". Cinematography at that time (even before the actor's participation in the films "Little Tragedies" by Mikhail Schweitzer and "The Meeting Place Cannot Be Changed" by Stanislav Govorukhin) was not among the main interests of Vysotsky in life; perhaps this is due to the fact that his screen biography was not as impressive as the stage. Nevertheless, Vladimir Semyonovich's desire to work in the film industry remained: it is no coincidence that in the same interview he mentioned several names of world-class directors with whom he would like to work; among them were Fellini and Bergman.

The star of over 25 films, Vysotski never won any state awards or titles during his lifetime (he was awarded the USSR State Prize posthumously in 1987). (Note: The director Yuri Lyubimov sent several petitions to the Ministry of Culture to award Vysotsky the title of Honored Artist of the RSFSR, but his proposals were rejected by officials.) In general, his film career, especially at the beginning, was not easy. The actor did not have the first prominent role, as it was the case with Lyudmila Gurchenko ("Carnival Night") or Vladimir Ivashov ("Ballad of a Soldier"). In the early filmography of Vladimir Semyonovich there were characters in whose pictures he appeared for a few seconds, saying one or two lines. In the second half of the 1960s, the directors of a number of films were more interested in Vysotsky's songwriting than in his acting potential. During this period, the artist's film roles often coincided with the images of heroes from his works. At the same time, Vysotsky's "semi-legal existence" in the culture sometimes forced filmmakers to "entrust" his voice to other performers.

Vysotsky's film heroes are mostly homeless people, as critic Irina Rubanova wrote. It was almost impossible to see them in a domestic, comfortable environment; their place of residence was a tent (in the films "Vertical" and "The Master of the Taiga"), a rented apartment ("Two Comrades Served"), a hotel ("The Fourth"). Perhaps the reason why his characters were mostly vagabond romantics, not attached to the household, lies in the fact that the energetic time forced and the actor and other "sixties" constantly removed "from the forced places" in search of new experiences, this sign of the era was picked up by cinematographers. However, the best works of the actor, according to the critic Oleg Kovalov, are not associated with modernity, but with participation in historical paintings or screen classics: Don Juan ("Little Tragedies"), Brodsky ("Intervention"), Brusentsov ("Two Comrades Served"), Von Koren ("Bad Good Man"), Zheglov ("Meeting Place..."). Captain Zheglov became the hero whom the audience "'forgave' the absence of songs".

In some of his movie roles, strength is clearly distinguished from egocentrism, masculinity from provincial demonism. For him, such concepts as "man's work" and "men's work" were real. This is confirmed by all his performances in film and theater: from Khlopusha to Svidrigailov and Captain Zheglov.

Vladimir Vysotsky's filmography
Year	Type	Title	Note
1959	f	Female Age-Mates	Student Petya (episodic role)
1961	f	Dima Gorin's Career	Elevator installer Sofron
1962	f	713 Requests Permission to Land	U.S. Marine Soldier
1962	f	Shore Leave	Sailor Peter, Valezhnikov's friend
1963	f	Penalty Strike	Gymnast Yuri Nikulin
1963	f	The Living and the Dead	Cheerful soldier (episodic role)
1965	f	On Tomorrow's Street	Foreman Pyotr Markin
1965	f	Our House	Radio technician
1965	f	The Cook	Andrey Pchyolka
1966	f	I Come From Childhood	Tank captain Volodya (songwriter and singer)
1966	f	Sasha, Little Sasha	Singer with a guitar (episodic role)
1967	f	Vertical	Radio operator Volodya (songwriter and singer)
1967	f	Brief Encounters	Geologist Maksim (songwriter and singer)
1967	f	War Under Roofs	Policeman at a wedding (performer of a song in the episode); the movie was released in 1971.
1968	f	Intervention	Michel Voronov / E. Brodsky (author and singer of the song "Like everyone else, we are cheerful and sullen..."); the film was released in 1987.
1968	f	Two Comrades Were Serving	White Guards lieutenant Alexander Brusentsov
1969	f	Master of Tayga	Ivan Ryaboy, rafting foreman (songwriter and singer)
1970	f	Dangerous Tour	Georges Bengalsky / Nikolay Kovalenko (songwriter and singer)
1970	f	White Explosion	Captain (episodic role)
1973	f	The Fourth	He
1973	f	The Bad Good Man	Zoologist Nikolai von Koren
1975	f	The Only Road	Driver Solodov (author and singer of "Solodov's Song"); Yugoslav premiere: January 10, 1975 and Moscow premiere: May 3, 1976.
1975	f	The Flight of Mr. McKinley	Street singer Bill Sigger (ballads' author and singer)
1976	f	The One and Only...	Boris Ilyich, head of the choir workshop (author and performer of the song "Chase")
1976	f	How Czar Peter the Great Married Off His Moor	Abram Gannibal
1977	f	The Two of Them	Episodic role of Maria's colleague
1961	ts	Eagle Prairie	Directed by Leonid Pchyolkin; episode; performance of a fragment of the song "White Snow..."
1965	ts	Room	Directed by Leonid Pchyolkin; episode; starring: Lyudmila Komarovskaya, Dalvin Shcherbakov, Veniamin Smekhov, Lyudmila Abramova, Eduard Arutyunyan
1979	s	The Meeting Place Cannot Be Changed	MUR captain Gleb Zheglov (performing a fragment of A. Vertinsky's song "The Lilac Negro")
1980	s	Little Tragedies	Don Juan

== First roles ==
Vysotsky's film debut took place in 1958, when he, a third-year student at the Moscow Art Theater School, was invited to play the role of a student Petit in Vasily Ordynsky's melodrama "Female Age-Mates". Subsequently, the actor not without irony told about the beginning of work in the film, mentioning that the only replica of his character ("coffer and trough") he pronounced from excitement "high voice and stuttering". As clarified Vysotskovoved Mark Tsybulsky, in fact, the student Petya exchanged with his interlocutor not one, but two short sentences, but the role was really discreet: in total, Vladimir Semyonovich was present on the screen no more than fifteen seconds.

Much more remarkable was the role of the editor Sofron, played by Vysotsky in the film "Dima Gorin's Carrer" (1961). The filming took place in the Carpathians in bad weather. In the story, the hero of Vladimir Semyonovich had to overcome the cold mountain river and climb the forty-meter electric power transmission, Vysotsky, who was in good physical shape, performed difficult tricks without understudies. The episode in which Sofron was actively courting Galya Beryozka (the heroine of Tatiana Konyukhova) was shot on the first day of shooting. According to the script, in love with Galya Gorin (Aleksander Demyanenko) for too free behavior had to punish the "rival" with a punch in the face. There were many takes, and Vysotsky, according to him, received from Demyanenko nine real blows to the jaw: "This is how my acquaintance with cinema began — with such an unfair fight". Despite the fact that the image of Sofron turned out to be very colorful, critics ignored both the movie and Vysotsky's character.

In the first half of the 1960s, Vysotsky often got the opportunity to participate in films thanks to the requests of Levon Kocharyan, who worked as a second director. Thus, on Kocharyan's recommendation, the actor got the role of the sailor Peter in "Shore Leave" (1961). Despite the fact that the hero of Vysotsky appeared in the picture only in a few episodes, the actor recalled the shooting on the cruiser "Mikhail Kutuzov" as a work with full vzhivaniya in the role: "I lived there for a month, slept in the orlop deck. I learned to scrub the deck".

Under Kocharyan's patronage, Vysotsky also took part in the first Soviet disaster film "713 Requests Permission to Land" (1962), where he got the role of an American marine. The picture, shot in the genre of "political detective", Vysotskovedami assigned as a separate milestone in the film biography of the actor, because the image created by him drew the attention of critics for the first time. The reviewer I. Razdorsky in an article devoted to "713..." ("Moscow Film Week", 1962, May 20) called his character a "good little guy" who nevertheless behaves too recklessly in the cabin — "as in an occupied country". Then followed small roles of the gymnast Yuri Nikulin ("Penalty Strike", 1963), Brigadier Markin ("On Tomorrow's Street", 1965), episodes in the films "The Living and the Dead" (1964) and "Our House" (1965). The work in Fyodor Filippov's film "Sinner", (Note: "Sinner", 1962, "Mosfilm", directed by Fyodor Filippov, Gavriil Egiazarov, screenplay by Nikolai Yevdokimov (based on the story of the same name by N. Yevdokimov).) where Vysotsky played a certain Pyrtikov, ended with the fact that the cut of his small role was completely cut out, while in the credits of the film the actor's surname remained.

In 1966 Edmond Keosayan's lyrical comedy "The Cook" was released, in which Vysotsky played the role of the Kuban tractor driver Andrei Pchyolka. Vysotsky, who was repeatedly accused by the director of offending the regime during the shooting, regularly sent telegrams from the film expedition to Moscow: "To Bolshoy Karetniy, to grandfather Levon Surenovich. Dear Grandpa, take me away from here. Edik is hurting me. In a letter from Krasnodar to his friend Igor Kokhanovsky, the actor reported that "nothing but drinking, in Krasnodar was not interesting. The result of the joint work was not satisfied with either Vysotsky or Keosayan. The actor was dissatisfied with the fact that his hero, repainted in blond, sings to the harmonica songs of someone else in an unfamiliar high voice. Keosayan did not hide his dissatisfaction with the fact that during the dubbing of the film Vysotsky could not be found in Moscow: "So I had to dub him with another actor".

Analyzing the first film roles of Vysotsky, Irina Rubanova noted that each of them could play another actor, they have not yet seen that acting personality, which was later found in his Don Juan or Gleb Zheglov.

Vysotsky, who starred in the films "The Career of Dima Gorin", "Peers", "Dismissal to the Coast", looked back at the cinematic favorites, went not from observation and his own point of view, but from popular models, that is, to independence has not yet sought. To say the opposite now would be an apostasy from the truth. <...> If it is curious today to watch his first films, then perhaps only to see clearly how stubbornly the artist sought his material, how persistently the thought was revealed, with what diligence the technique was honed.

== In the second half of the 1960s ==
=== "I Come From Childhood" ===
The first film work that changed Vysotsky as an actor of "episodic" roles was the role of the tank driver Volodya in the film "I Come from Childhood" by the Belarusian director Viktor Turov. They met due to Turov's interest in the author of "unusual songs". In the summer of 1965, Vysotsky came to Minsk for an audition at the suggestion of the film's director, Alexander Knyazhinsky. After the audition, which Vysotsky passed, according to Turov, "not badly", several of his songs were recorded on professional wide magnetic tape. In the evening of the same day, Vysotsky sang his songs to the guitar in the dormitory where the operators lived. Informal communication between the director and the poet turned into friendship. Despite the fact that there were more successful auditions of other actors, Vysotsky was approved for the role.

The thirty-year-old gray-haired tank captain, who had been burned in a tank during the war and had a scarred face, was chosen by the director to be the author and singer of his songs (they were not included in Gennady Shpalikov's script). In August the film studio "Belarusfilm" signed a contract with Vysotsky to write and finish three works for the following films: "Brotherly Graves", "Stars" and "Height". Viktor Turow successfully integrated the songs deeply into the plot of the film; it was impossible to remove them without damaging the picture. "Brother's Graves" in the film was performed by Mark Bernes. Vysotsky liked his heartfelt performance. According to the testimony of Bernes' wife, Lilia Mikhailovna Bernes-Bodrovoy, Vysotsky himself invited Mark Naumovich to perform this song in the movie.

The film was shot in Slonim, Grodno, Smolensk and Yalta. According to the recollections of the crew members, Vysotsky behaved "as his own" while working on it, creating a friendly atmosphere of trust and complicity around him. The picture appeared on the screens at the end of 1966. For the first time the poet's songs sounded from the screen, and in the credits his name appeared for the first time in a new capacity — as the author of songs. After numerous approvals and re-voicing in the film fully included two works - "In the cold, in the cold..." and "Brotherhood Graves", three - partly ("Height", "Song of the Stars") and two lines from "Penal Battalions". In terms of acting, Vysotsky did not fully realize himself in this picture. The film received mixed reviews from critics; according to Turov, the press "trashed" it twice. The reviewer of the magazine "Isskustvo Kino" A. Vartanov wrote: "There are no significant human characters, and the actors, in fact, there is nothing to play. V. Belokurov, E. Uvarova, N. Urgant, V. Vysotsky find themselves in a very strange position, as if something remembered from previous roles, trying to fill the void of characters, but in vain ... "

=== "Vertical" ===
External media

Audio
- | Mountain climber
- | A Song About a Friend

Video
- | A Goodbye to the Mountains
- | A Song About a Friend

In the early summer of 1966, the Taganka Theater toured Georgia. During his stay in Tbilisi, Vysotsky received an invitation from the Odessa Film Studio to participate in the film shooting about mountaineers with the working title "We — Idiots". In those years the film studio, like any other company, had a compulsory production plan: the Odessa studio had to release five films by the end of the year. A very weak script, later renamed "We — the Possessed", reached the novice directors Stanislav Govorukhin and Boris Durov in April 1966. Their attempts to rework the plot of the work ended in failure, and the debutants decided to base the film on songs — to make "a kind of poem about the mountains". At first the creators of the picture tried to attract Yuri Vizbor to participate in the project, but he, dissatisfied with the dramaturgical material, refused to work. Vysotsky gave his consent and was approved almost without a trial for the role of the radio operator Volodya. The script and the role of the radio operator Borodacha, who stayed in the camp and warned his comrades of the danger, interested Vysotsky much less than the possibility of writing songs for the film.

"Vertical" divides Vysotsky's life into before and after. After this movie, Vysotsky's fame skyrocketed <...> vertically upwards. He saved "Vertical" from oblivion, if not for Vysotsky's songs, the movie would have been firmly forgotten. The film's director Stanislav Govorukhin admits that: "The movie owes its success to Vysotsky first and foremost, both his songs and his appearance on the screen".

The work of the film group took place in the Elbrus region, in the Baksan Gorge, and included mandatory climbing courses for the actors. The head of the group of instructors of the film was a professional mountaineer Leonid Eliseev. The shooting, which took place in real conditions at an altitude of over 3000 meters, required from the actors qualifications at the certain level, and in some scenes and masters of sports in mountaineering. According to the results of filming Vladimir Vysotsky received a certificate and badge "Mountaineer of the USSR". Eliseev, who became friends with Vysotsky and told him episodes from his mountaineering practice, became an unwitting co-author of the first written for the film "Song about a friend". If at the beginning of work on the film Vysotsky complained in a letter to his wife that he could not write about what he "did not know" and doubted the successful result, then, according to Govorukhin, soon the actor was imbued with the idea of mountaineering, and the songs "poured out of him like a cornucopia". The final version of the film included five of Vysotsky's songs; two of them: "Mountain Climber" and "The pure ice on the Earth, the pure..." were not approved. As a composer, the film's creators invited the then little-known Sofia Gubaidullina. Her music for the film and orchestrations to Vysotsky's songs were accepted by the Hudsovet, who nevertheless had complaints about the picture itself: the commission did not like the ending, the lack of a pronounced dramaturgy. Due to the lack of time for reshoots, the film appeared on the screens without changes. In June 1967, the film "Vertical" was released in wide distribution. Most of the viewers saw Vysotsky on the screen for the first time, got acquainted with his new works, discovered that he was not a representative of the blatant world, singing about "little criminal", which sounded from tape recorders all over the country, but a dramatic actor and author of songs of various themes. The film was a big box office success. It was seen by 32.8 million viewers. "Vertical" noticed and critics, whose opinion was almost unanimous: "The film is weak, but the songs are good". Vysotsky's acting was not emphasized in the reviews, but the lyrics of the songs were printed in many publications.

In the songs, and partly in Vysotsky's character from the film "Vertical", there are collected inner motives, sometimes already worked out, sometimes only sketched. He would develop them in his later roles. There is the theme of strength that strangely turns into weakness, the theme of unrequited love, the sacred belief in male friendship and mutual support, as well as the motif of being unrooted in everyday life, the eventlessness of his characters, which is constant in all of Vysotsky's film roles without exception.

=== Brief Encounters ===
In the summer of 1966, Vysotsky told Lyudmila Abramova that he had read the script of the film "Brief Encounters", written by Kira Muratova and Leonid Zhukhovitsky, at the Odessa film studio, where he had come to negotiate with Stanislav Govorukhin about filming "Vertical": "A good script, a good role, the protogonistic one and again wearing beard". Vladimir Semyonovich passed the auditions; according to him, were quite successful, but the leader of Hudsovet approved for the role of geologist Maxim another artist — Stanislav Lyubshin. Just before the launch of the picture in production found that Lyubshin is bound by contractual obligations with the tape "The Shield and the Sword", and the creators of "Brief Encounters" were forced to return to the candidacy of Vysotsky. As recalled operator Gennady Karyuk, 1966-1967 years for the actor became a period of endurance tests, because he had to combine work at the Taganka Theater with simultaneous participation in two films.

External audio
- | Fairy Tale Song About The Eevil
- |Pure Ice

The story of geologist Maxim's short-lived romance with the young barmaid Nadia (Nina Ruslanova's film debut) and his complicated relationship with his wife — Executive Committee official Valentina Ivanovna Sviridova (this role was played by director Kira Muratova after the approved Soviet actress Antonina Dmitrieva did not arrive on the set) is the core of the film "Brief Encounters", shot in the "natural" style of the 1960s. Maxim is a typical hero of the "sixties": unaccustomed, lonely and homeless; he combines "Hemingway's" desire for free wandering with Pechorin's desire for novelty. He leaves his loved ones without drama, returns without excuses, speaks of love with a light irony, and hums songs with tired mockery: "In the enchanted swamps / There live kikimors...". (Note: "In enchanted swamps / The kikimoras live there..." — lines from V. Vysotsky's song "A Fairy Tale Song about the Wicked". The film included a fragment of the song.) According to film historian Anna Blinova, only once in the soft film "the true Vysotsky broke through in a contrasting way": we are talking about the episode when Nadia, appearing at night at the geologists' campfire, brings Maxim a sewn jacket.

And here in the picture: first Maxim's eyes shone, then his silent, passionate appeal. <...> Vysotsky did not utter a single word, he showed the state of his hero's instant infatuation by his facial expression and plasticity. It was a moment of truth that convinced us that the geologist Maxim could be one of the great achievements of Vysotsky, if the image was created not in half tones and half voices, not with irony, not with feigned lightness, but with full force.

When accepting the editing of "Brief Encounters" editorial board of the film studio made a number of complaints. In the conclusion of the commission, dated February 16, 1967, in particular, it was stated that the song performed by Maxim "Golololod" should be replaced, because it "carries a lot of clues, forcing a completely different interpretation of the entire film. Then the studio received a letter from the State Committee for Cinematography, which noted that the heroine Nadia, "coming together with Maxim, in essence, commits a deeply immoral act. However, the authors do not condemn her for this, they do not give a moral assessment of Maxim's actions. Despite the fact that first in the director's script, and then in the picture were made changes, the final verdict of officials remained harsh: "The film did not turn out and the image of the hero. In the performance of actor V. Vysotsky character Maxim gets a vulgar shade. As a result, the tape received the lowest category and was quickly excluded from distribution. Nevertheless, Vysotsky called his role in "Brief Encounters" one of his favorites.

=== Intervention ===
In the winter of 1967, Gennadi Poloka was asked to begin work on the film "Intervention," based on the play of the same name by Lev Slavin. The director, who wanted to avoid the cinematic "stamps" that often saturated images of the Civil War, wrote a kind of manifesto in the press, calling on artists to "revive the traditions of theater and cinema of the early years of the revolution". According to Poloka's plan, the film was to be shot, on the one hand, in order to accommodate the spectaculous and, on the other, to raise serious historical questions. The main character of "Intervention" —the underground revolutionary Brodsky— was a participant and at the same time a "director" of the events in the tape. This character has attracted the attention of many actors: so, photo auditions were made with Andrei Mironov, in test filming also participated Mikhail Kozakov, the role of Brodsky seemed attractive for Arkady Raikin, too.

Vysotsky, recommended to Poloka by Vsevolod Abdulov, auditioned with Olga Aroseva as Madame Xydias. The candidacy of Vladimir Semyonovich, presented to the Lenfilm Art Council, was rejected among the members of the commission, whose demands were connected with the artist's "specific appearance" and "theatrical manner". Poloka was able to defend Vysotsky thanks to the support of Grigory Kozintsev, who was then in charge of the director's workshop at Lenfilm. After the approval of the actor for the main role in the film became popular joke saying, formed during the Civil War and played with the names of tea merchants, sugar manufacturers and revolutionaries: "Tea is Vysotsky's, sugar is Brodsky's, Russia is Trotsky's".

External audio
- | The Brodsky's Song

Vysotsky's participation in the picture with a farcical, foolish style and "play in the play" was a native element; he appeared on the set even on the days when he was not shooting. His character appeared before the audience not only in different masks, but also in different costumes: he was dressed in an officer's uniform, then in an elegant jacket, then in a striped sailor's jacket, then in the clothes of a prisoner. Episode with a fight, in which Brodsky had to take full blows of opponents, the actor played without substitutes, according to Anna Blinova, these shots are "not inferior to such scenes in American action movies. At the end of the picture, when the underground prisoner waited to be shot, his game "in disguise" ended. With the tired dignity of a man who has preserved himself under difficult circumstances, Brodsky sang his last song: "Like everyone else, we can be cheerful and grumpy, / But when we have to choose and the choice is hard - / We choose wooden costumes, - / People! People!" (Note: "Like everyone else, we can be happy and sad..." — "Brodsky's Song", written by Vladimir Vysotsky in 1967. It is set to music in the film by Sergei Slonimsky.)

The film was not accepted by the Goskino Commission, which considered that "Intervention" portrayed "our sacred events and Brodsky's character in an impermissibly eccentric way". In October 1968, the board of the Committee on Cinematography issued a resolution stating that further work on "Intervention" was recognized as unpromising. All the materials of the film, including the negatives and phonograms, were transferred to the Gosfilmofond of the USSR. Members of the film group, not resigned to the ban on the film, tried to defend it. They signed a petition to Leonid Brezhnev, stating that the allegations against the film were "tendentious and unfounded". According to Valery Zolotukhin's diary, (he played the role of Jenya Ksidias in the film), he was the author of that letter. According to Gennady Poloka, "letter to the authorities" was written by Vysotsky. Despite all the efforts, during the lifetime of Vladimir Semyonovich "Intervention" was never released. Eight years after the end of filming, Gennady Poloka managed to restore a copy of the tape and showed it to the actor Brodsky: "We watched the two of us in an empty hall. He was sitting unusually quietly and continued to sit when the lights came on. The film was released after Vysotsky's death in 1987.

=== Two Comrades Were Serving ===
Vysotsky joked that his filming in Odessa could be attributed to two periods: "bearded" and "mustached". In 1966, while working on the film "Vertical" and "Short Meetings", he appeared before the audience in the form of two bearded characters with similar characters, and the next year, the revolutionary underground Brodsky from "Intervention" and the White Guard lieutenant Brusentsov from "Served Two Comrades" resembled each other by the presence of mustaches. But their resemblance did not end at the appearance - both were brave, risk-taking people of about the same age, who acted in 1919 in Odessa "on opposite sides of the barricades". In his letter to Lyudmila Abramova Vysotsky told about the difficulties in obtaining this role — the head of the acting department of "Mosfilm" Adolf Gurevich was strongly opposed to the approval of the actor's participation in the film directed by Yevgeny Karelov. Resolve the issue positively managed only with the help of Mikhail Ilyich Romm (at that time — the head of the creative association "Comrade", where the film was shot): "he said in all ears that Vysotsky, de, he persuade, after which Gurevich could only go and kiss his ass, what he did immediately". Due to the fact that not a single Vysotsky suffered from the actions of this boss, among the actors went a joke: "A good man won't be named Adolf!"

The film covers a short period of time when Wrangel's army left the Crimea. The author of the script Valery Frid and the director of the film saw in the image of Alexander Brusentsov not the usual, stereotypical white officer who could be played by Oleg Strizhenov, Vasily Lanovoy, Oleg Yankovsky, but a fierce, non-standard, strong and tough man. His role was intended to show the tragedy of the White Guard movement. Karelov's choice of Vysotsky as an actor may have been influenced by his image of tank captain Vladimir from the film "I Come from Childhood", the role of Galileo and Khlopusha in performances at the Taganka Theater. According to Alla Demidova, the prototype of Brusentsov could also be a dragoon captain played by Vysotsky in the play "The Hero of Our Time". Irina Rubanova found a sketch of the role in the episode "White Guard" from "Ten days that shook the world", which was part of the repertoire of "Taganka". The actor, on photo auditions reminiscent of Lermontov, demonstrated the necessary strength and anger, character, temperament, which the scriptwriters and looked for in the performer of this role.

The positive heroes of the film were two Red Army soldiers: Karyakin (Rolan Bykov) and Nekrasov (Oleg Yankovsky). The "white" and "red" plots existed in parallel in the picture. Vysotsky made the audience sympathize with his negative hero, creating the image of a cruel, intelligent, straightforward, fearless officer with undiminished principles, determined and assertive. According to film critic Anna Blinova, Vysotsky had all the same qualities in life, which allowed him to organically adapt to the role and turn it into a great acting success. A part of the episodes with Brusentsov was cut from the film. According to the testimonies of the participants of the shooting, the reason was the brightness, successful performance of the role of Vysotsky. He overplayed the "two comrades" and gave the White Guard officer qualities that he should not have according to the official ideas about the Civil War; his role came to the fore.

The shooting took place in August-September 1967 in Odessa and Izmail. The last reshoots were planned for October, but the work could not be finished in the scheduled time, and the schedule of delivery of the film was interrupted. The reason was "violations of the regime". Not only actors, such as Vysotsky and Yankovsky, but also two artists and even the director of the film were seen. Vysotsky, drinking, fell off a horse, Yankovsky fell into a sobering up center, the director of the film - for three days in intensive care. Because of this constipation expedition had to be shortened and finished only in March of the following year. The premiere of the film took place on October 21, 1968. The film was quite successful at the box office, with 22.5 million viewers. Critics met the film quite kindly, reproaches, if they appeared, referred to the work of the director, not the actors. The screenwriter Valery Fried rated Vysotsky's performance in the film as excellent. According to him, the actor "seems to be satisfied with his work". Vysotsky said:

I thought it would be the best role I would ever play in a movie. And it probably would have been if you got what was filmed. But it didn't.

=== Master of Tayga ===
In the early summer of 1968, director Vladimir Nazarov invited Vysotsky and Valery Zolotukhin to play roles in the film "Master of the Taiga". Zolotukhin agreed to play a "positive policeman" — Sergeant Sergezhkin, and Vysotsky got the role of rafting foreman Ivan Ryaboy — a rude thief. During this period against Vysotsky in the Soviet press was unleashed a broad newspaper campaign, the initiators of which - among other things — condemned his "husky wailing wild blatnyh songs and savoring thieves' jargon" and accused Vladimir Semyonovich in "attacks on our ideology and undermining the socialist system from within. Against the background of these events, the approval of the role was not without difficulties. In the district party committee told the director: "Vysotsky - this is a morally degraded man, rotten to the core...We do not recommend to take it. The director of the Taganka Theatre had also signed the permission with difficulties.

The shooting of the film took place near the village of Viyezzhiy Log in the Krasnoyarsk region. Zolotukhin and Vysotsky changed their place of residence several times. For some time they lived in an empty, abandoned Siberian house, which was left by the son of one of the villagers, Anna Filippovna, who had left for the city. "Mosfilm" provided the actors with only two cots and some household utensils. A photographer of the film crew gave them a lamp with "five hundred candles". The work on the film was hard (also because of a very primitive script), Vysotsky constantly clashed with the director and the operator of the film, trying to make changes in the dramaturgy of the work and influence the shooting process. In a letter to Veniamin Smekhov he reported: "You shoot slowly and unwillingly. My scenes are just too slow. Zolotukhin's are a little faster, but still. Each shooting day we feel anxious and demotivated. <…> This trip for us is called "Summer is gone". Summer, rest, mood and dreams".

Vysotsky and Zolotukhin had the opportunity to sing songs in the film. Zolotukhin sang "Oh, Frost, Frost", and Vysotsky reworked one of his earlier works about prospectors - "Somewhere there on the lake..." ("Ryaboy's Song"), and also suggested two new songs: "The House of Crystal" ("If I am rich like the king of the sea...") and "How many wonders lie behind the mists..."; the second of the works was not included in the film. His character, Ivan Ryaboy, added to the gallery of images of vagabonds created by Vysotsky, but unlike Maxim from "Short Encounters" and Volodya from "Vertical", this character "came" to the film not from the poet's tourist cycle, but from his early, "blatnoe" song and poetry. At the beginning of the tape, Ryaboy looks like a "sturdy industrialist", in the finale the viewer sees a man with a "pitch-black" soul. Vysotsky revealed the type of man in whom cruelty, despair, the desire to suppress and the ability to obey in the name of ruthless love coexist.

Clattering, rough, "a real pal" and at the same time formidable, frightening, Ivan Ryaboy knows one law: the whole white world - a kind of taiga, the people of which are divided into two parts - subordinate and submissive.

On July 14, 1969, the movie premiered. It did not receive good critics in press, but was seen by 26.8 million people. At the screening in the Central House of Cinema, Vysotsky and Zolotukhin received gifts from the Ministry of Home Affairs: Zolotukhin received a personal watch, Vysotsky a certificate of honor "for active promotion of the work of the police". According to film historian Anna Blinova, despite the fact that the film starred, in addition to Vysotsky and Zolotukhin, such famous actors as Lionella Pyryeva, Mikhail Kokshenov, Leonid Kmit, the box office receipts of the film was provided by Vysotsky. A photo of his character, Ivan Ryaboy, appeared in many newspapers and magazines, including the American "Time" and the German "Der Spiegel". Vysotsky himself did not name The Master of the Taiga among his creative successes and was not satisfied with the result.

=== Dangerous Tour ===
The role of the poet Georgy Bengalsky (revolutionary Nikolai Kovalenko), played by Vysotsky in Georgi Yungwald-Khilkevich's film "Dangerous Tour", was a kind of continuation of the image of the underground leader Brodsky from Intervention, and the films themselves, according to Vysotsky's researcher Elena Kuznetsova, turned out to be "extremely similar". Despite the thematic proximity of the two films, the attitude of the authorities to "Dangerous Tours" was from the beginning more favorable than to the work of Gennady Poloka. The director already announced in the preparation period that he saw in the role of George Bengalsky only Vysotsky, acting organically, which was taken into account when writing the script (according to the editor-in-chief of the Odessa Film Studio S. Strezhenyuk, Yungvald-Khilkevich "began hunting" for Vladimir Semyonovich since the shooting of "Brief Encounters"). The auditions, to which Vyacheslav Shalevich, Yuri Kamorny and Yevgeny Zharikov were invited, became a formality, because the artists knew that the candidate for the title role had already been virtually chosen. At a meeting of the Art Council and the script editorial board, held on January 3, 1969, considered sketches and test recordings of the film. In the conclusion of the commission noted that among the applicants for the role of Bengalsky "the most favorable impression leaves actor V. Vysotsky. Similar loyalty to the unfinished picture was demonstrated at the "intermediate stages", so, during the study of working materials members of the commission noted that "particularly successful Vysotsky, Kopelyan ... The material is reliable, has interesting camera work".

The film was not saved from very harsh reviews by the press neither by the good atmosphere during the shooting nor by the support of Anastas Mikoyan, who saw in the story of the protagonist of "Dangerous Journeys" elements of the biography of his comrade — the revolutionary Maxim Litvinov. The film, which premiered on January 5, 1970, was criticized for its lighthearted attitude to serious events and the excess of scenes with vaudeville and can can; Vysotsky was accused of being "full of platitudes, not without success in imitating the significance of what is happening". Film historian Irina Rubanova, in an article published in 1975, called the role of Bengalsky one of Vysotsky's creative failures, as she did not see in his work "any mental or artistic cost". The actor himself, speaking during performances about filming in the movie Yungvald-Khilkevich, said: "Despite the criticism, I warmly relate to this picture".

Decades after "Dangerous Tours" appeared, reviewers remained divided. Elena Kuznetsova, for example, argued that Jungwald-Khilkevich's film was a loser compared to Gennady Poloka's picture, because the new artistic form that appeared in "Intervention" was not suitable for the idea of "Dangerous Tour", which eventually turned into "a kind of traditional example of musical theatre. Film scholar Anna Blinova, on the other hand, wrote that one should not consider Bengalsky only as a reader of verse and tap dancer:

The main color that Vysotsky uses to create the image of Bengalsky-Kovalenko is the deterioration of the human body. He plays a completely tired man, tormented by too active, his dual activities on the verge of breaking the forces of the spiritual and physical. <...> Unfortunately, this task was not very difficult for Vysotsky: he and in his real life was often at the break of his own strength, playing and working at wear and tear.

It is possible that the "reputation" of the film "Dangerous Tour" (the release of which coincided with the preparations for the Lenin's centenary) was one of the reasons why Vysotsky, who by the end of the 1960s was in the creative baggage of a number of major film roles, was not accepted in March 1970 in the Union of Cinematographers of the USSR. The repeated consideration of the issue was held at a meeting of the Board of the Union of Cinematographers of the USSR after the anniversary events, in July of the same year, and again ended with a refusal: "The question of admission to membership in the Union actor of the Taganka Theater V. S. Vysotsky to postpone for one year in connection with the facts of his indiscipline". The artist received a membership card of the Union of Cinematographers only in 1972.

=== Other roles ===
In the second half of the 1960s, Vysotsky played several episodic roles, which passed the attention of the press. About one of the pictures —the comedy "Sasha, Little Sasha" (1966)— the actor spoke of as a "very bad movie", the creators of which he "by misunderstanding" passed his songs. Initially, the participation of Vladimir Semenovich in this tape was not planned, and director Vitaly Chetverikov, sympathetic to the work of Vysotsky, especially for him added to the script a small role in the operetta artist. Work on "Sasha, Little Sasha" was hard, accompanied by reshoots and replacements of performers (at a certain point, instead of Valery Zolotukhin, who played the main male role, the site was invited to Lev Prygunov), withdrawal of episodes and re-voicing. In the final version, Vysotsky's character, unmotivated and out of touch with the plot appeared in the cafeteria, sang in an alien voice the song "The front door hasn't been opened for a long time, / The boys have already broken the windows..." (Note: "The front door has not been opened for a long time, / The boys have already broken the windows..." - Lines from V. Vysotsky's song "A fairy tale song about an old house on Novy Arbat". In the movie it is set to music by Mikael Tariverdiev. Written for Tariverdiev's opera "Who are you?") Vysotsky's last name was not mentioned in the credits.

In 1967, Vysotsky appeared in Viktor Turov's film "War Under Roofs": the actor had a small role of a policeman at a wedding singing a song. At the meeting of the Art Council of "Belarusfilm" the episode with the working title "Wedding" was recognized as "good, authentic", but not fitting into the overall picture: "The wedding is good, but what is it for in the film? There is a semantic charge, but there is no plot". As a result, the scene with Vysotsky was reduced to a minimum, and the actor appeared on screen in the crowd for only thirty seconds.

Another small role Vysotsky played was in Stanislav Govorukhin's film "White Explosion", which premiered in August 1970. A year earlier, the director, along with cameraman Vasily Kirzhibekov and mountaineer Leonid Eliseev, had been involved in a helicopter accident. Due to the injuries suffered by the members of the film crew, the shooting location was moved from Kabardino-Balkaria to Crimea. Vysotsky, who at that time was travelling with Marina Vladi on the ship "Georgia", visited Govorukhin in Alushta and agreed to play in "White Blast" the episodic role of the captain. After that, the director remembered that Vladimir Semyonovich also sent him a sound letter with two "mountain" songs. One of them ("You walk on the edge of the glacier...") was dedicated to the memory of Mikhail Khergiani. Neither of the songs was included in the picture.

== 1970s ==
=== The Fourth ===
Konstantin Simonov's play "The Fourth" was performed in the early 1960s at the Leningrad Bolshoi Drama Theater and the Moscow Sovremennik Theater. The author's friend, director Aleksander Stolper, for whom it was already the fifth work on Simonov's works, expressed the desire to make a film based on it. The action takes place in America in 1962, the plot includes a retrospective reference to the past of the protagonist, to the time when he was a prisoner of war in a German concentration camp, one of the four prisoners who organized the escape of all prisoners. On the role of the "fourth" invited Vladimir Vysotsky. Neither before this tape, nor after it, he was not involved in works of this kind — the picture was actually a play-film. The creators of the film invited Armen Dzhigarkhanyan, Margarita Terekhova, Yuri Solomin, Lev Durov, Tatyana Vasilyeva. The psychological state of the hero, his dialogue with his conscience was expressed in dance by Maris Liepa.

On July 31, 1972 Vysotsky came to Riga for shootings. According to the memories of the costume designer Ganna Ganevskaya, at the beginning of the work he was "out of shape" — he drank and could not stop. The film crew called Marina Vlady from Paris, who was able to influence him. Her arrival solved the problem — more during the shooting of "The Fourth" Vysotsky did not drink. About his role he said:

This role is very strange, interesting. It was called "He". He doesn't have a name, this man. He poses the problem of conscience, of the fact that a man once, at some point in his life, still has to decide who he is... Whether he is going to remain a man, or whether he is going to slip further down the path he has deliberately chosen.

The actors who took part in the filming of Vysotsky's work were diametrically opposed in their opinions. Armen Dzhigarkhanyan said in a 1992 interview that it was "an unsuccessful role, it's as if he doesn't play there, he just walks, speaks, is present". Lev Krugly, who created the image of Teddy Frank, argued that Vysotsky's play does not go in any comparison with his gift as a bard. Tatiana Vasilieva, on the contrary, noted that although the role given to Vysotsky was dark, no one would play it better than him. Margarita Terekhova called his acting brilliant.

"The Fourth premiered on May 7, 1973. Despite a strong acting ensemble, the film failed and did not become a major cinematic event. Critical reviews were muted. Vysotsky's work in this role, his interpretation of the image, was criticized for being monotonous and flat. Critics mainly blamed the director, believing that Vysotsky's performance, in which only the motifs of "guilt" and "fall" were seen, did not allow the actor to convey the complexity of the drama and experiences of his character, and led to the creation of a dull and straightforward image. Konstantin Simonov recognized that the accusations against the hero of "The Fourth" were partly due to him as the author of the play. According to the publicist Nikolai Andreev, the plot is "fundamentally false, the conflict is clearly far-fetched, almost in every line propaganda context", but the performance of the actors is so convincing that "you begin to believe the movie".

=== The Bad Good Man ===
When Iosif Kheifits was selecting the cast for the film "The Bad Good Man", he expected that the role of the zoologist Von Koren would be played by a tall artist with a sturdy physique. Such was the hero of Chekhov's story "Duel", the plot of which became the basis for the film. Before the director did not see Vysotsky neither on the screen nor on the stage, but listening to his songs, was sure that the owner of such a powerful voice is a tall giant, "a kind of superman. Therefore, when Vladimir Semyonovich arrived in Leningrad for a film audition, Kheifits was surprised to find that the actor's appearance did not even remotely resemble a bogatyr. However, during the first interview with Vysotsky, the director decided that it is this artist will look harmoniously paired with Laevsky, whose role was offered to Oleg Dahl. According to the plot, the characters were antipodes, although Dal and Vysotsky —on the game nerve— looked close people: "both Hamletic, Byronic".

Vysotsky did not hide from the director that his acceptance of the role could be a problem. According to Kheifits, the actor even had to turn to the cosmonauts, who promised him their support during Vladimir Semyonovich's performances in "Zvyozdny gorodok". Their intercession was probably effective; as Georgy Grechko argued, "To fight against Vysotsky was to fight against one's own people". Kheifits' intercession was probably effective. To be on the safe side, Kheifits decided to present the Art Council not with recordings of individual rehearsals, but with a kind of reel — a small film showing the entire ensemble of actors in the future picture. As a result, the commission approved both Vysotsky and Dahl, whose candidacy was also initially questionable due to violations of the regime.

The Pavilion was shot at Lenfilm, and a significant portion of the film was shot on location in the Crimea. According to the film's second director, Evgeny Tatarsky, Vysotsky was initially surprised by the meticulous attention Kheifits paid to the smallest details of von Koren's costume, including the "half-torn button" ("He's a single man and probably has no one to take care of him"). In the dinner scene, which took place in Dr. Samoilenko's house, there were no props: all the dishes were delivered hot from the restaurant of the Grand Hotel Europe, whose cooks knew that "this is for Papanov, Vysotsky, Dahl". Fresh herbs for filming were sent by planes from the Caucasus. At the dinner, Laevsky and von Koren were antipodes: the Dahl's hero nervously grabbed pieces, jumped up, easily agitated, stingy with the display of feelings, meanwhile Vysotsky's character demonstrated a thorough knowledge of etiquette and "the manners of a foreign diplomat". Similar was the characters' behaviour in other episodes: Laevsky, prone to mood swings, drinking, emotional, fidgety, looked like a man "both 'bad' and 'good' at the same time"; his "informer" (the taciturn von Koren) usually looked at his opponent with cold half-disdain.

Vysotsky told about that character:

I represent Von Koren. He is obsessed with the maniacal idea of saving civilization by "improving the human race" by destroying the weak ones. Ehrenburg wrote in his book on Chekhov that von Koren was already expressing his ideas when Hitler was still a baby. We did not want to portray von Koren as a forerunner of fascism, but tried to show his moral defeat. The duel with Laevsky turned out to be for von Koren the victory of his consistent philosophy of life and at the same time his moral defeat.

"The Bad Good Man" was released in 1973 and elicited a large number of reactions, including those concerning Vysotsky's work. Critics noted the accuracy of the intonation and the actor's ability to exist on screen "within the limits of Chekhov's style and Chekhov's dramatism". In 1974, the film won the Silver Plate Award at the Chicago International Film Festival. That same year, at the Festival of Nations in Taormina, Vladimir Vysotsky, the creator of von Koren's character, was awarded the Best Actor prize. It was the only lifetime film award in his creative biography.

=== The Only Road ===
The first foreign film in Vladimir Vysotsky's film biography was the Soviet-Yugoslav film The Only Road (in Yugoslavia it was called in Serbian "Okovani shoferi") by the Serbian director Vladimir Pavlovic. According to the version of the artist Gennady Yukhtin (who played the role of Zollern), the director's attempt was use of the popularity of Taganka in general and Vysotsky in particular. In order to get permission to film Vysotsky without any problems, Pavlovich invited Nikolai Dupak (director of the theater) to participate in the tape in the episodic role of a German general. The wordless role could not interest Vysotsky much, but his songs were planned for the film, and he would get the opportunity to cross the border "for free" and meet Marina Vlady; therefore, the actor agreed.

Part of the film was shot in 1974 in Transcarpathia, near Uzhhorod, in old abandoned quarries. Vysotsky played the Russian prisoner of war Captain Solodov, in the past before the war - a student and poet. Once in Nazi captivity, he chooses a heroic death: chained to the steering wheel of a car, he crashes into an enemy gasoline truck. In the movie there are three scenes with the hero Vysotsky — their filming did not take the actor much time. He prepared three works for the film: "On the road, now! Or lie down in the coffin!..." ("Song of Solodov"), "Shooting mountain echo" and "If somewhere in a strange unknown night...". The songs were recorded with an orchestra at "Filmski studijo Titograd" (Serbian).Before dying, Vysotsky's hero sings the lines: "We won't die a painful life, / we'd rather be revived by a sure death" from "Solodov's Song". Vladimir Novikov points out that the origin of these lines is due to the role of Vysotsky in the play "The Fallen and the Living" and a poem by the frontline poet Boris Slutsky, which the actor read from the "Taganka" stage: "For our personal fate, / For our common glory ...". In July and August, the filming continued in Montenegro.

The film was premiered in Yugoslavia, Belgrade, on January 10, 1975 and in Moscow on May 3, 1976. Only "Solodov's Song" was performed in the rental version of the film; the other two pieces were not included in it for unknown reasons. Despite a representative ensemble of actors: Lev Durov, Vladislav Dvorzhetsky, Irina Miroshnichenko, Igor Vasiliev, Viktor Pavlov, Gleb Strizhenov, Igor Klass, Gennady Yukhtin, Vladimir Kashpur, and Anatoly Kuznetsov also starred in The Only Road — the film, according to Viktor Bakin, turned out to be "uninteresting". Vladimir Vysotsky himself said the following about it:

I had a role without words, without a single word, but with songs... A role with death, so that I could shoot, die, sing and finish in five days. I went to Yugoslavia. We filmed in Montenegro, in very interesting places. I wrote poems about the Montenegrins there, because I couldn't rest on Pushkin's laurels...

=== The Flight of Mr. McKinley ===
In 1973, the director of the film "The Flight of Mr. McKinley" Mikhail Schweitzer invited Vysotsky to participate in his two-part film primarily as a poet — the ballads' author. His idea was to use them in the picture as an illustration or a commentary to the plot. According to his idea, the author's thought should be in the form of a layer of songs —in a Brechtian, detached way— accompanying the plot, which would make it possible to adapt a complex novel by Leonid Leonov for the screen. The script included detailed "instructions": prose drafts for each ballad. Vysotsky was interested in the proposal and gave his consent to work, and nine days later presented to Schweitzer and his wife and collaborator Sofia Milkina seven songs. Schweitzer, who had envisioned ballads in the "American style" (and even intended to invite Dean Reed to write them), was "stunned" by the result. The zongs composed by Vysotsky were not pure American songs, but the task was carried out with vivid imagination, civic, politically sharp, respectful of every thesis of the director's plan. In fact, it turned out to be a kind of "film within a film". "Ballad of Coquillon" and "Interrupted Flight" ("Someone saw the fruit ...") in the script was not originally planned — Vysotsky offered them himself. At the same time, he was dissatisfied with his music to the poetic texts and assumed that it would be reworked by the film's composers.

For the performance of ballads in the film, was introduced a character of a street singer Bill Sigger, who was to be played by Vysotsky. On December 3, 1973, Mosfilm signed a contract with Vysotsky to write eight songs for the movie. He created two more works: "The March of the Bears Football Team" and "Ballad of the Mannequins". Then the gradual elimination of his songs from the film began. Ballads not included in the script were not accepted; "The Ballad of Guns" was removed along with the episode for which it was intended, even at the script approval stage; "March of the Football Team..." was not approved by the censors; "The Ballad of Little Man" was replaced by Bill Sigger's recitative. At the beginning of direct work on the film in the script remained four ballads out of nine. At the artistic council against the role of Bill Sigger unexpectedly sharply opposed the author of the film story Leonid Leonov: "I absolutely do not need anyone else's words and no additional person to express myself. Nothing of it! Why should there be a stranger in my marriage bed? Schweitzer wrote a letter to the chairman of the State Committee for Cinematography, Philip Ermash, warning that he would refuse to shoot the film without the street singer and the ballads he sang. Since Leonov did not receive a statement with a categorical rejection of the director's version of the script, work on the film continued. On December 20, 1973, Vysotsky auditioned for the role and was accepted.

The music for the film was composed by Isaac Schwartz. He wrote music for two ballads: "The March of the Bear Football Team" and "The Ballad of Leaving for Paradise" ("Here is your ticket, here is your carriage..."). The music was successful, and Vysotsky liked the songs. Leningrad composer Anatoly Kalvarsky was invited to write the rest of the music, on Shvarts' advice, "to preserve Vysotsky". He made arrangements close to Vysotsky's music for the orchestral recording, with only the "Ballad of the Mannequins" requiring significant musical revision. It was recorded with the accompaniment of Georgy Garanian's orchestra. Sofia Milkina was ambivalent about the results: "I was very disappointed with the recording of the songs with the orchestra itself. Compared to the very first performance, it was as if a bird had heavy weights on its wings and was flying, but was always going down almost falling...".

On July 17, 1974, Vysotsky left for the shooting in Hungary. According to Donatas Banionis, who played the role of Mr. McKinley in the movie, Vysotsky was withdrawn in Budapest, practically did not communicate with anyone; it seemed that he was in a severe depression. On one of the days of shooting in the Hungarian capital, a scene was filmed where Vysotsky performs on the square "Someone saw the fruit...". These shots were not included in the film, the record was not preserved. As members of the film group recalled, one of the most successful scenes was "Hippie Mystery": it was a "compressed opera" and was supposed to be the end of the first series. The episode took two nights of shooting. The main operator of the film Dilshat Fatkhullin called the result of filming this scene "very powerful". A completely different opinion about this and some other fragments was held by Philip Ermash, who said after the screening: "Ah! Hippies are out of fashion, it's all over. Cut it all out". In the final version of the movie, prepared for distribution, one and a half ballads remained; the role of Bill Sigger turned from a key role into an episodic one.

The movie premiered on December 15, 1975. Vysotsky, seeing what was left of his work in the film, according to Sofia Milkina, "left the cinema sick". The tape received good press, those ballads that sounded in the movie were noted both by the audience and critics. The creators of the film and a number of actors involved in it became winners of the State Prize for 1977. Vysotsky was not honored with any awards. The only copy of the director's complete version was destroyed due to an editor's neglect.

"The Flight of Mr. McKinley" was shown for almost two months. It seems that even the creators of the picture did not expect such a success. Is not an attempt to increase the chances of popularity of the film can be explained by the appearance on the screen Vladimir Vysotsky with a guitar? His ballads are good themselves. In addition, in terms of meaning, they are related to Leon's problems. For example, in the song about mannequins there is a clear condemnation of social infantilism, which is one of the main motifs of the film".

=== The One and Only... ===
Two years after finishing work on the film "The Bad Good Man", Joseph Kheifits invited Vysotsky to take part in his new film. In the Lenfilm tape "The One and Only...", filmed after Pavel Nilin's story "Dope", the actor got a small role of Boris Ilyich — the leader of an amateur choir, a lonely and insecure man. At a meeting of the Art Council, explaining the nature of this character to the members of the commission, Kheifits said that the image created by Vysotsky was very poorly described in the script, but the actor managed to create a new character for Soviet cinema: an ambitious provincial loser.

Boris Ilyich's story has secrets hidden behind the scenes; the audience never knew what circumstances influenced the gifted musician's fate. Fragments of his biography were partially "decoded" in the party scene, when one of the hero's school friends mentioned that the greatest hope in their class was Boris Ilyich and a certain Sashka Sheremet. Years later, Sheremet began to give successful concerts and tour the world, while Boris Ilyich was destined for the fate of a choirmaster in a provincial ensemble of six — "and nothing more". Among the members of the group led by him was a waitress at a local cafe, Tanyusha Fesheva (Elena Proklova), who was a trail of ambiguous rumors in the city. After one of the rehearsals, the heroine invited the rain-soaked head to his home. In the hands of Boris Ilyich was a guitar, and while he played the song "The Chase" ("In a little hop / I ruled the forest"), Tanyushin delight before the power and temperament of the "Maestro" mixed with pity. The young woman saw and wet summer shoes at the feet of the musician, and an old netted bag, which contained food for his bachelor dinner — a bottle of kefir and a packet of tea.

According to the memories of the main artistic director of the film, Vladimir Svetozarov, Vysotsky was very attentive to the filmed episode: for him were important both elements of the interior of Tanyusha's house, and details of Boris Ilyich's costume. The actor himself made suggestions concerning the appearance of his character.

In this movie I play a strange role for me, it's the first time I play such a role. A seducer... But not fully Don Juan, he's a "shabby temptress". He's got all the things that seem good, but they were good ten years ago. But now his buttons are all torn off, his suede jacket is shabby. I had this jacket made for me at the House of Models, and then we rubbed it with sand and mud for three days.

The song "Pogonya" (chase), sung by Boris Ilyich, was not the only piece Vysotsky submitted to Lenfilm for this movie. As later explained by the director of the film "The One and Only..." Yuri Gubanov, Vladimir Semyonovich was not a member of the Union of Soviet Writers, and therefore officially pay him for the "Pogony" at very high rates, which existed for professional writers, the studio administration could not. To get around this formality, Vysotsky was offered to sign a contract for the transfer of two song lyrics — this allowed to increase the fee. The second work was not used in the film song "A musician explained to me at length...", composed by Vladimir Semyonovich in the 1960s. Three episodes with Vysotsky were shot in the summer of 1975 in the pavilions of Lenfilm. The actor, densely involved in the theater repertoire, did not have the opportunity to fly to Leningrad often. In the same way was loaded with work very much in demand at that time, Elena Proklova. Realizing that it will be difficult to combine the characters in one frame, Kheifits began to shoot the actors one by one. A significant part of the shooting time Vysotsky spent on the set without a partner, in a number of scenes "communication" of their characters was carried out at the expense of montage work.

"The One and Only..." premiered on March 1, 1976. During the year the film was seen by more than 33 million viewers — the film became one of the box office leaders. The press reacted quite vividly to the role of Boris Ilyich — Vysotsky's character was written about as a "club seducer" or an "indomitable, defeated demon". According to Joseph Kheifits, who was later conceived to screen the works of Isaac Babel, he planned to continue cooperation with Vysotsky and invite him to play the role of the leader of the band of robbers Benya Krik; this plan remained unrealized.

== How Czar Peter the Great Married Off His Moor ==
Vysotsky had known the director Alexander Mitta since the late 1950s. It was not a "casual" acquaintance, but a longer serious, even friendly relationship: they met at Marlen Khutsiev's house, where Tarkovsky, Shukshin, Gennady Shpalikov often saw each other; Vysotsky often visited Mitta's apartment together with Veniamin Smekhov, Oleg Tabakov, Oleg Yefremov, Galina Volchek, Vsevolod Abdulov. Marina Vlady became friends with Mitta's wife Lilia and often left her children with her during her visits to Moscow. In the late 1960s, when the director had the idea of working on the adaptation of Pushkin's prose, he came to the screenwriters Yuli Dunsky and Valery Frid with the idea of casting Vysotsky in the title role. Vladimir Semyonovich readily agreed to play Ibrahim Hannibal and actively participated in the process of creating the film. For the role in "The Moor of Peter the Great" claimed the American singer Harry Belafonte, very successful auditions were held at Alexander Kaidanovsky. Cinematographic leadership persistently offered the director's trip to Paris, in the successfully performing there the theater of Ethiopians, to select an actor. But Mitta held numerous formal auditions: the director, seeing in the image of Hannibal only Vysotsky, wanted to show "how differently love Russia poet and tsar". By agreement with Mitta, Vysotsky wrote two songs for the film - "The Domes" ("How will I look today, how will I breathe?!") and "Robbery" ("As in a troubled volost...").

The shooting took place in the second half of 1975: first in Jurmala, then in Moscow. The movie starred such actors as Alexei Petrenko, Valeri Zolotukhin, Oleg Tabakov, Mikhail Kokshenov, Ivan Ryzhov, Lyudmila Chursina, Mikhail Gluzsky and Semyon Morozov. In the film Vysotsky demonstrated not peculiar to him before the skills of ballroom dancing and fencing — for this actor had to study with a choreographer and sabre fencing coach. According to film historian Anna Blinova, Vladimir Vysotsky found for his hero many colors: "this is the ultimate sincerity, uncompromising, nobility, lack of understanding of the nature of bad inhuman acts, sacrificial, pure, even though literary love, straightforwardness. Against the background of lubochnogo representation of the actor played a real drama and turned into a tragic hero, caught in a comic situation. But in the course of work, fulfilling the "director's ideas", Vysotsky became increasingly gloomy and immersed in himself, according to Blinova, he did not accept the scenes containing untruth of history and untruth of art, which abounded in the resulting material.

External audio
- | "As long as the rope witheres..." ("The Robbery Song")
- | "The domes in Russia are covered with pure gold..."

An even greater disappointment awaited the actor at the editing stage. First, the tape was removed from some key scenes, including the climax, for fear that they would not be accepted by the Hudsoviet; the tragicomedy became a simple comedy. Then, at the behest of the bosses, all the scenes with dwarfs representing the Senate action were subjected to editing — in the fact that the smallest became the main character, the censors saw hints of modernity. Thus, many necessary episodes were removed from the film. The censors also changed the title and came up with a new one — "How Czar Peter the Great Married Off His Moor". But the main disappointment of Vysotsky was the removal of his songs from the film. It was very hard for him. There are several opinions about the reasons why this happened. In his memoirs, Mitta said that the director of "Mosfilm" Nikolai Sizov pointed out the necessity of their removal. In addition, the dissatisfaction was expressed by Alfred Schnittke, according to the director, the composer, whose music became the main emotional background of "How Czar Peter the Great Married Off His Moor", asked him the question: "Choose: either me or Vysotsky". Another version was presented by screenwriter Valery Fried, who said that during the editing of the tape found that the songs, especially "Domes", "sharply out of style, set a height to which the picture could not reach. All these events made an oppressive impression on Vysotsky; about the actor's reaction, Mitta recalled as follows: "He did not say a word..."

The premiere of the film took place on October 16, 1976 at the Central House of Cinema. The movie was well received by the audience: it was seen by 35.9 million people. In the list of box-office hits of those years it surpassed other Pushkin adaptations — "Ruslan and Lyudmila" and "The Tale of Tsar Saltan". The press was also quite friendly, critics emphasized the scenes where Vysotsky's acting suspended the frivolous balaganistic action of the picture and gave it "philosophical depth". Some observers drew a parallel between Vysotsky's role in "How Czar Peter the Great Married Off His Moor" and the actor's best works on the stage of the Taganka Theater. The magazine "Ekran" wrote the following lines about the release of that film:

This entertaining and colorful film performance with a dynamic plot, music and dance tells the story of Ibrahim Hannibal — the Moor of Peter the Great, while limiting itself to only a few episodes of his life: Hannibal's friendship with the tsar and his love for Natasha, the daughter of Boyar Rtischev. And the story, of course, ends happy.

Two years after the film's release, Mikhail Sholokhov declared in a letter to Leonid Brezhnev, General Secretary of the Secretariat of the Communist Party of the Soviet Union, that the film "degrades the dignity of the Russian nation, spits on the progressive efforts of Peter the Great, ridicules Russian history and our people. Vladimir Vysotsky, three years after the premiere, when asked how he felt about playing the role of the arapist Peter the Great, replied, "Nothing, frankly, because I was already so tired of not being able to do what I wanted to do, unfortunately.

You know, I have a special relationship with "Moor", and I wanted to make a very different movie. And I got dragged into this adventure, making a kind of semi-opera. It was much more serious and...and much more interesting.

== The Two of Them ==
External videos
- | "The Two of Them" episode

The only completely foreign film in Vysotsky's film biography was "The Two of Them" or "The Two of Them" (Hungarian: Ök ketten), shot at the Hungarian film studio Mafilm by director Márta Mészáros. The film was titled as "Women", "Two Women", and "Mari and Julia" in other countries. It was not purchased for distribution and was not shown in the USSR. The film is interesting for the fact that it is the only joint work of Vladimir Vysotsky and Marina Vlady. In the spring of 1977, Vysotsky was recording a record in Paris, and from there he stopped for a few days in Budapest to see Marina, who was already involved in the filming. Martha Messarosh had known Vlady since 1969, and she met Vladimir Semyonovich a little later, at a film festival in Moscow in the early seventies. During the tour of the Taganka Theatre in Budapest, Marta persuaded Hungarian television to make a documentary about Vysotsky, so their relationship grew into a friendship. It was in Budapest and Székesfehérvár that the film shooting took place. Initially, Vysotsky's participation was not planned: a Hungarian actor had already been approved for the role, but after learning about the arrival of Vladi's husband, Mesarosh persuaded his compatriot to abandon the shooting in favor of Vysotsky. Marina and Vladimir Semyonovich starred in a small episode — the main character Maria (a married woman) goes to the movies on a Saturday night with a colleague from work:

We're walking out of the movie, chatting, and suddenly, out of the blue, you kiss me. I laugh, you get offended, I tell you that it's the first time I've kissed anyone other than my husband, and that it wasn't that uncomfortable. I leave you standing there with a surprised and disappointed look on your face and walk away. Freeze frame.

Martha Messaros said in her memoirs that Vysotsky repeatedly admitted to her that he loved this episode - during filming it was snowing, and the scene turned out beautiful and romantic. Martha had plans for the couple to participate in a Soviet-Hungarian-French film, but the project did not come to fruition.

=== The Meeting Place Cannot Be Changed ===
==== The film's history ====
According to Arkady Weiner, Vladimir Vysotsky was not only the actor of the role of Gleb Zheglov — the actor was actually at the origin of the picture "The meeting place cannot be changed". Having received from the Weiner brothers a copy of the book "The Age of Mercy" published in 1976, Vladimir Semyonovich soon informed the co-authors that the novel about the work of the Moscow Criminal Investigation Department was almost ready to be made into a multi-part film, in which he would like to "stake" the role of Captain Zheglov. During this conversation, the names of other possible candidates for the role of the head of the anti-gangster department were mentioned: among them, Sergei Shakurov and Nikolai Gubenko. However, it was Vysotsky who, according to Arkady Weiner, "felt the postwar atmosphere" and "the psychology of the detectives of that time". The candidacy of Gubenko considered and when discussing possible performers of the role of Vladimir Sharapov, but in this case, the tape would appear in two characters close in type — "with some bandit cunning". As the director of the film Stanislav Govorukhin later said, he remembered too late about Leonid Filatov, who could create the image of an intelligent, "not inferior to Zheglov in strength, not passing before him".

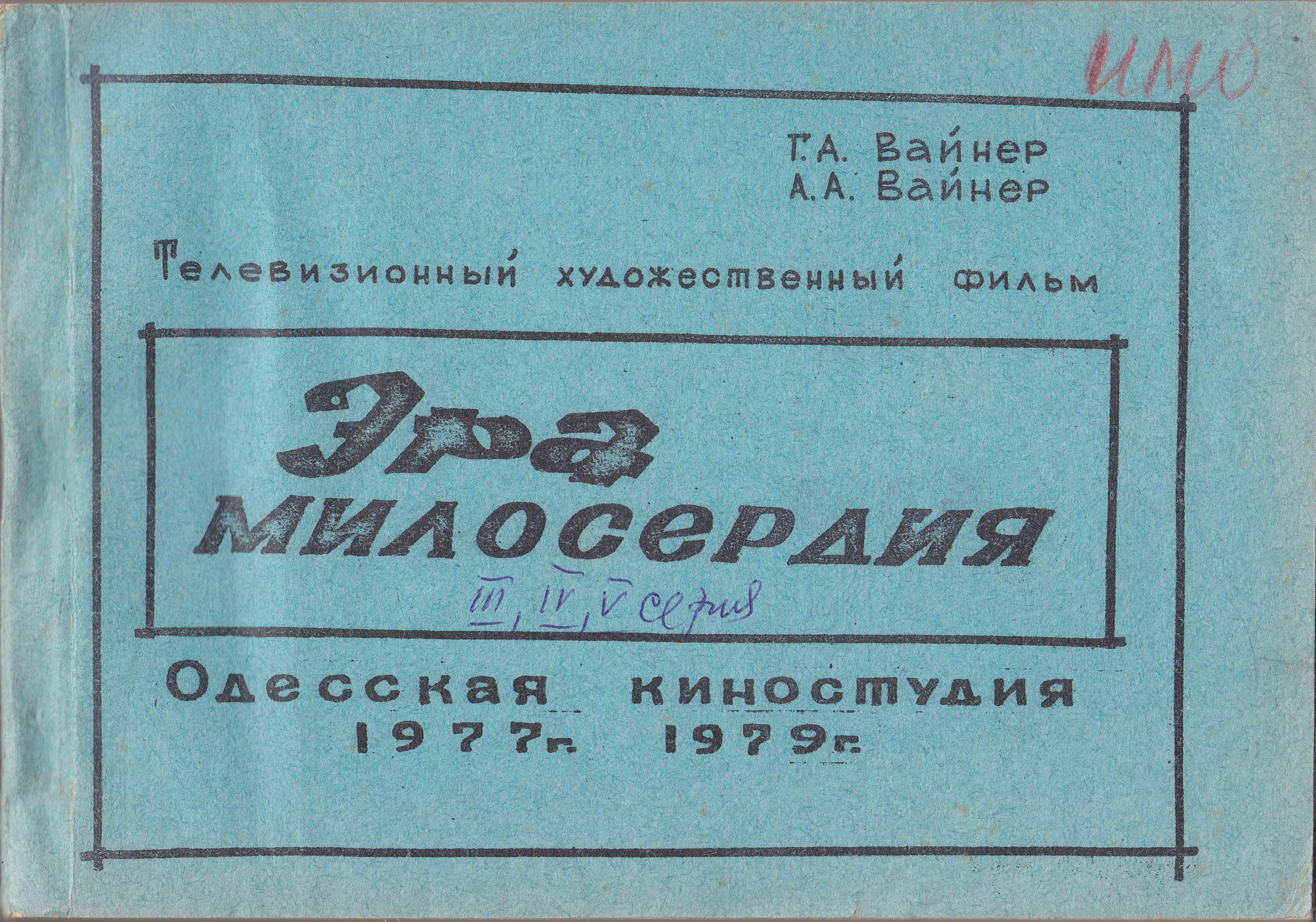
Cover of the director's script of the movie "The Meeting Place Cannot Be Changed".

The script with the original title "The Age of Mercy", on which the Vainera brothers and Stanislav Govorukhin worked in Peredelkino near Moscow, was created with Zheglov-Vysotsky in mind; Vladimir Semyonovich, who regularly visited the dacha village, also offered various options for the development of this or that episode. Auditions, to which Govorukhin deliberately invited "non-passable actors", became a formality — the Hudsoviet Odessa Film Studio easily approved the candidacy of Vysotsky. Clothing for his hero (galliffet, jacket, shirt-apash) actor himself chose in the costume warehouse. The picture went into production in May 1978. Shooting day Vladimir Semyonovich, who had no titles or state awards, paid at first on a low scale — thirteen rubles a day. Later - thanks to the petitions of the Vainer brothers — the rate was increased: Vysotsky began to pay forty-two rubles per shift, Vladimir Konkin -the actor of the Sharapov's role- fifty-two. (Note: According to other sources, June 9, 1978 Vysotsky appealed to the chairman of the USSR Goskino Ermash with a request for a rate increase. On June 15, the director of the Odessa Film Studio G. P. Zbandutu was instructed to "establish the artist Vysotsky VS, who plays the main role of Zheglov in the television film "The Age of Mercy", the rate of film actor of the highest category of the first group, ie 50 rubles per shooting day, for the period of production of the film".)

In "The Meeting Place..." Vysotsky managed to prove himself as a director. When Govorukhin had to leave for a while in the middle of shooting, he entrusted Vladimir Semyonovich with all the work connected with the staging part. He independently filmed the episode about Fox's identification, as well as the scene of Sharapov's interrogation of Dr. Gruzdev. Afterwards, members of the film group recalled how the actor advised them at various stages. For example, Yevgeny Leonov-Gladyshev, who played the role of Vasya Vekshin, said that Vysotsky offered to dress his character in a white officer's scarf, which in the post-war years was worn by young people who did not go to the front (these shots were not included in the film). The actress of the role of Zheltovskaya Yunona Kareva admitted that it was difficult for her, who had no cinematographic experience, to be in front of the camera, but Vysotsky surrounded the actress with "the most real paternal care". According to Stanislav Sadalsky, it was Vladimir Semyonovich who came up with the idea of giving Kirpich's image an unforgettable voice — a whispered "bandit's way of speaking". The actor suggested to the creators of the picture to attract to the shooting Vsevolod Abdulov and Viktor Pavlov, who played Peter Solovyov and Levchenko, respectively, he also recommended to the director to invite to the role of the fox Alexander Belyavsky.

Vysotsky was going to give for the film a number of songs ("Ballad of Childhood", "About the end of the war", "Stay a day you in the policeman's skin..."), but none of them was not included in the picture. According to some sources, the actor himself refused to use them, because he felt that in this case Captain Zheglov risks turning into Vladimir Vysotsky; according to others: the idea of songs was rejected by Govorukhin, who decided that there would be a destruction of the overall drama and the image of the hero. Nevertheless, in one of the episodes Zheglov sang a fragment of Alexander Vertinsky's song "The Lilac Negro", interspersing the lyrics with lines addressed to Sharapov. The theme of the song was played by Vysotsky in 1980 in the dedication, timed to the creative evening of the Vainers, and included the lines: "I didn't sing to you in the movie, although I wanted to, / Even my brothers supported me: / There, according to the book, my Gleb sang somewhere, / And the whole MUR endured all five days, / But in Odessa Zheglov was clamped".

The television broadcast of "The Meeting Place..." began on November 11, 1979. In 1981, at the IX All-Union Film Festival in Yerevan, Vysotsky was awarded a special diploma and a jury prize for his performance as Zheglov. Another posthumous award, the USSR State Prize, was given to him in 1987. The Union of Cinematographers of the USSR, which sent a proposal to the award committee, stated that Vysotsky was nominated "for the performance of the role of Zheglov in the television film 'The Meeting Place Cannot Be Changed', produced by the Odessa Film Studio, and for the author's performance of songs and ballads in the films 'Vertical', 'The Flight of Mr. McKinley', 'War Under the Roofs', 'The Starting Point'". In the final resolution, the wording was corrected — the mention of film works, except for "The Meeting Place...", was deleted.

==== Gleb Zheglov's character ====
The phrase "The Era of Mercy", which carries the key message in the script, is uttered in the communal kitchen by Mikhail Mikhailovich Bomze (Zinovy Gerdt), who dreams of that ideal future when all crime will disappear; in his opinion, it will be defeated not by law enforcement agencies, but by humanity. Until that time has not come, to fight the gang "Black Cat" has to Murovtsy, including Gleb Zheglov and Vladimir Sharapov. The two heroes have a lot in common, but in general they are different. Sharapov is a native Muscovite; Zheglov spent his childhood in the countryside and probably his adolescence as a street kid ("I was such a kid — I slept under the boilers where they boiled asphalt"). Sharapov lives in a room that is spacious by postwar metropolitan standards and furnished with good old furniture; Zheglov, who has no corner of his own, lives in a dormitory. Sharapov is in love with the "right girl," Varya Sinichkina; Zheglov has neither a wife nor a fiancée; his only appearance with a woman takes place at a police party, when the captain, descending the stairs with his companion, has difficulty hiding his triumph - "and he is no worse than others.

At the same time, there are "white spots" in Zheglov's biography that lead researchers to believe that the police captain, who knows the criminal underworld inside out, was once "the king of the street in Zamoskvorechye or Maryina Roshcha". According to film historian Irina Rubanova, Gleb Egorovich's appearance, vocabulary, and intonation suggest a man who "had been in prison"; according to Vysotskology researcher Vladimir Novikov, in the subtext of the script there are indications that the hero is "from the old days". Anna Blinova disagrees with these arguments and believes that there is no "nostalgic sympathy" for criminals in Zheglov; this is confirmed by the phrases bordering on defiance uttered by the hero in the situation with the purse planted by the pickpocket Kirpich: "A thief should be in prison! And people do not care how I put him there!". The art historian Natalia Krymova, for her part, noted that the peculiarity of Zheglov's speech and behavior was due to "those bandit melodies that Vysotsky used to play fluently and that now subordinated the general meaning of the film".

There was no need for make-up. Accurate inner character, as they would say in the old Moscow Art Theater, needs minimal outer color. But it was masterfully done, and that is why the jacket on Gleb Zheglov's shoulders, the hat on his head, the shirt on his body, and the way he himself sat at his desk were so good.

Vysotsky gave the character his own impetuosity, his ability to move quickly and make split-second decisions. Zheglov is the head of the department, but there is no hint of frivolous and bureaucratic bossiness in him: Gleb behaves directly in his office, he can sit on the table with ease, lean freely. The hero easily switches to "you", is able to defuse the situation with a joke and tease one of his colleagues without malice. At the same time, he is unappealing, and the intonation with which Zheglov gives orders excludes the possibility of disobedience. He does not tolerate objections and becomes irritated when subordinates begin to show excessive independence: "You are what, eagle, hold off on your wise questions for now! Got it? Your number sixteen, shut up, got it?" Vysotsky freely and easily used all the material in the script, revealing the many facets of the hero's character. According to Natalia Krymova, the actor who worked on Zheglov's character, "almost for the first time, as they say, broke out. And having broken out, showed unprecedented on the set of the will of the creative order". One of the moral and ethical questions raised and left unanswered in the film is Zheglov's attitude to the law. In the episode with the planted wallet, Gleb Egorovich's opponent is Sharapov, who is convinced that any falsification in the work of the police must be excluded: "If the law is tampered with once, then another time, it will no longer be a law, but a flail! In the final scenes, the characters once again show that they have a different idea of a just world order. Zheglov, not hearing Sharapov's desperate cry, shoots at the fleeing Levchenko.

I agree with almost all the critics, but they all stopped a quarter of the way through, they did not agree, which is still very interesting and important to explore this topic: which of them is right? How should we deal with terror: in the same way or still tolerate it and try to find other ways? Nobody in the world can answer this question. I, for example, agreed to act in this movie in order to ask this question.

==== Little Tragedies ====
The role of Don Juan in Mikhail Schweitzer's television film "Little Tragedies" was the last in Vysotsky's film biography. Afterwards, the director of the film, talking about the choice of the actor, noted that there are stereotypes according to which the image of the fatal seducer should be embodied only by structured artists with spectacular appearance. Vysotsky was not one of them, but in him the director saw the qualities inherent in Don Juan: "He is a poet and a man. <...> You see, Pushkin's heroes live "on the edge of the dark abyss" and find "inexplicable pleasures" to exist in the face of impending doom. Don Juan is one of them. And Vysotsky is one of them".

At the audition for the film, which took place in December 1978, Vysotsky was paired with Tatiana Dogileva, who pretended to be Laura. According to the actress' recollections, they were filmed very thoroughly, together and separately: the work took a whole day at all. In addition to Vladimir Semyonovich, Sergei Yursky and Mikhail Boyarsky tried out for the role of Don Juan. As a result, the candidacy of Dogileva was rejected hudsovete (Laura in the movie played Matluba Alimova), and Vysotsky waited at least two months for the verdict. Schweitzer, initially set on his participation in "Little Tragedies", had to solve the problem with the consent of the actor through Goskino and other instances.

The shooting took place in Lithuania and Azerbaijan. The pavilion was shot at Mosfilm. Vysotsky, who was very busy at that time (at the same time with "Little Tragedies" he took part in the film "The Meeting Place...", acted in the theater and gave concerts), flew to the film expeditions directly to his shift. Being fully focused on the image of Don Juan, the actor did not get in touch with the film group, did not sing during the breaks, and communicated mainly with the partners in the episode and with the director. As told by the operator of the film Mikhail Agranovich, Vysotsky appeared on the set fully ready for filming. If when working with other actors Schweitzer sometimes had to visually show the image of the role, then with Vladimir Semyonovich everything was different: the actor knew the material so well that the director accepted his suggestions almost without comment.

"Little Tragedies" had two premieres. The first took place on February 29, 1980 at the Central House of Cinema. Vysotsky could not come to the first screening because he was giving a concert in one of the research institutes. Nevertheless, during the performance the actor mentioned the film, noting that "Schweitzer made a wonderful, in my opinion, montage of Pushkin's poems". A few months later, in early July, "Little Tragedies" began to be shown on television. This was Vysotsky's last appearance on the screen. Probably Vladimir Semyonovich did not see a single episode of the film (except for the fragments he saw during the dubbing). In the days of the show he was solving the problems connected with the desire to get rid of drug addiction and cure away from Moscow, in the prospecting artel Vadim Tumanov. Attempt to fly to the "Artel" and lock himself up in an isolated cabin, living under the supervision of doctors, failed, despite the purchased tickets. Three and a half weeks later Vysotsky died. Most of the reviews devoted to "Little Tragedies" in general and the image of Don Juan in particular were published after Vysotsky's death and were quite favorable.

But there is one acting performance in this film, in which the "golden ratio" of the image of Don Juan created by Vladimir Vysotsky is found. In a particularly careful, harmonious and musical way of pronouncing the poetic text, the actor, within the limits of the image of Juan, gives the character of both his creator and the poet's thought. How is this achieved? Vysotsky leaves the thinnest gap between himself and the role, thanks to which there is a slight shift, a detachment of the image. <...> Thus a breakthrough is made into a poetic cinema, adequate to the inner world of Pushkin's tragedies.

== Songs for movies ==
In his speeches to the audience, when talking about the work on works for cinema, Vysotsky emphasized that it was always important for him to see: the song organically fits into the plot of the picture, increases the semantic load, adds new facets to the disclosure of the characters. All in all, Vladimir Semyonovich offered no less than one hundred and thirty songs and ballads for various films: some of them written directly for this or that tape, others were created earlier. At the same time, not all the works given to the studios ended up on the screen; according to the author, out of five songs given to him for a film, only two made it to the screen - the rest were either rejected before the start of the film or removed during the production or editing.

When Vysotsky lived, not all professional composers and musicologists were ready to consider him as a colleague. For example, the critic Vasily Kukharsky noted in the pages of the magazine "Soviet Music" (1968, № 10), published under the auspices of the Union of Russian Composers, that Vysotsky creates "muddy nonsense about some Ninka" and his music is "a reprise of blat and semi-blatnoy 'folklore' to a cheesy guitar 'scoop'". Vladimir Semyonovich's creative efforts were not accepted by either Dmitri Kabalevsky or Vasily Solovyov-Sedoy, who wrote in the newspaper "Sovetskaya Rossiya" in 1968: "I am resolutely opposed to the imposition of eloquence, bandit vocabulary and musical primitivism on our young people". It is likely that the lack of official recognition of his music was not recognized. It is likely that the lack of official recognition and membership in the Composers' Union had a direct effect on Vysotsky's relations with cinematographers: in a number of films in which his songs were used, the author's surname was not mentioned at all in the credits. For example, in the film "Quarantine" (Note: "Quarantine", 1968, Dovzhenko Film Studio, director Sulamif Tsybulnik, scriptwriter Yuriy Shcherbak, composer Valentin Silvestrov. The film was proposed, but did not include the songs "Here and parted ways-roads suddenly ..." and, perhaps, "Beautiful love more often and diligently ..." and "The battle cries have thundered ...") Vladimir Semyonovich's song "Long ago the salvos of the guns have fallen silent..." was sung by Yuri Kamorny; the author was not mentioned in the credits. The same thing happened with the work "Long time you went in an envelope, a leaf...", included in the adventure movie Attention, Tsunami!: the song and music theme turned out to be the leitmotif of the picture, the credits indicated the composer Oleg Karavaychuk, the authorship of Vysotsky remained behind the scenes.

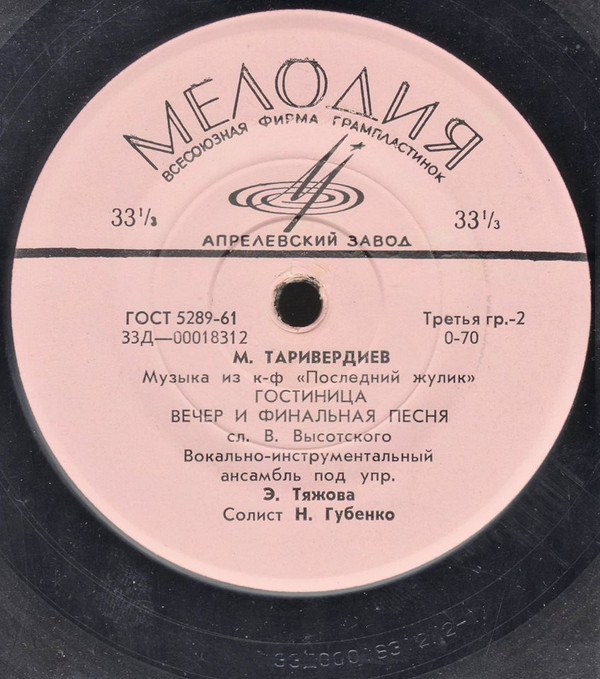
Melody's Minion. Music from the movie "The Last Hustler".

According to Igor Shevtsov, who wrote the screenplay for the film "Mercedes escapes the hunt", Vladimir Semyonovich tried to claim his copyright even at the end of his life. In 1980, when the Dovzhenko Film Studio began to negotiate with him about the transfer of the song "At the End of the War", Vysotsky put forward a condition: "I want to be considered the author not only of the text, but also of the music, because they are shouting: not a composer, not a composer! What's that got to do with it? My song, my melody and the instrumentation are none of their business. Anyway, let them pay for the music!" The studio agreed, the recording took place, but the song was not included in the film.

According to Vysotsky, one of the most successful experiences of working with songs in Soviet cinema was embodied in the film "Vertical". Each of them had an "independent value" and at the same time correlated very precisely with the style of the film, its content and video sequence. The music for "Vertical" was written by Sofia Gubaidulina, who later admitted that the works of Vysotsky sounded in the film — "absolutely extraordinary phenomenon", and she treated them with the utmost tact, editing only one of his songs (it was necessary for the recording with an orchestra) and preserving the arrangement of the author's intonations, their "drama and romanticism". Among those who appreciated Vladimir Semyonovich's songwriting was Mikael Tariverdiev, with whom Vysotsky crossed paths first at the Taganka Theatre (the composer wrote music for the play "The Hero of Our Time"), and then in the films "Sasha, Little Sasha" and "The Last Hustler". With the movie "The Last Hustler", in which three songs based on Vysotsky's poems were performed, the countdown of his discography began: in 1967 Tariverdiev's record with the first recording of Vladimir Semyonovich's work was released, we are talking about the song "That's what: life is beautiful, comrades...", performed by Nikolai Gubenko.

Vysotsky worked with Sergei Slonimsky on songs for the film "Intervention". According to the composer, communication with the poet and actor left him with very pleasant impressions: Vladimir Semyonovich proved to be a professional who was responsible for the task. The picture includes two songs written by Vysotsky and Slonimsky. One of them — "Thunder rumbled" was performed by Yefim Kopelyan. The second — "Brodsky's Song" about wooden costumes was a rather complicated aria, since it contained three melodies; Vysotsky, who sang it, "mastered this performance task brilliantly". Later, with Slonimsky's approval, Vladimir Semyonovich prepared his own version of this song; he performed it at concerts.

External audio
- | "Ballad About Fight"
- | "Song About Time"
- | "Song About Two Dead Swans"
- | "Song of the Free Riflemen"
- | "Song About Hate"
- | "Ballad About Love"

Vysotsky collaborated with composer Isaac Schwartz in three movies. Their first meeting took place on the set of the detective movie "Affairs of Bygone Days...", for which Vladimir Semyonovich wrote the song "The Candles Are Melting..." — a kind of stylization of an old romance in the style of Alexander Vertinsky. As the composer later recalled, when he handed over the lyrics, Vysotsky said that he was not interested in the amount of royalties he would receive for this work, but that it was important for him to have his name in the credits. The result was a tango performed in the film by Inna Varshavskaya. The second meeting between Shvarts and Vysotsky took place during the shooting of the tape "The Black Prince", for which the poet and composer wrote the song "Are we locked in a vicious circle? As Mark Tsybulsky noted, the song, sung by Valentina Tolkunova and placed in the film outside the logic of the plot, did not strengthen the content of the picture. In addition, Shvarts and Vysotsky participated in the creation of the movie "The Flight of Mr. McKinley". According to Vysotsky's recollections, "we made orchestrations, worked a lot at night. It was a very difficult film. As a result, the film, from which seven of Vladimir Semyonovich's ballads were excluded, turned out to be far from the original idea.

In the picture "The Arrows of Robin Hood" Vysotsky was invited as an author and performer of ballads. Vladimir Semyonovich composed six works for it: "Ballad of Love", "Ballad of Struggle", "Song of Time", "Song of Two Dead Swans", "Song of Free Riflemen", "Song of Hate". Music for three songs, according to the idea of the creators of the movie, wrote Veniamin Basner (as performers were supposed to "Pesniary"), the other three were to be played with music Vysotsky in the author's performance. Cooperation with Basner did not take place (according to the composer, he terminated the contract with the studio "due to the fault of zealous ideologists who did not want to let Vysotsky on the screen"). Vysotsky himself until a certain point perceived participation in the film positively: "I wrote six big ballads, wrote the lyrics, music and will record them, probably with the Pesnyars. However, during the delivery of "Arrows of Robin Hood" director Sergei Tarasov was instructed to exclude from the movie all ballads Vysotsky. Thanks to a copy preserved by Tarasov, the original version of the tape was restored in 1997. In addition, four songs were included in the movie "The Ballad of the Valiant Knight Ivanhoe", also released after Vladimir Semyonovich's death in 1982.

Most of Vysotsky's songs are characterized by the greatest subtlety and unconventionality in terms of the number of bars in a phrase, and rhythm, as if creating its own pulse next to the pulse of the metrical basis of his songs. <...> Then there are a lot of such fine details in harmonization, and in melody, and in cadence — in the refusal of stencil kadansov or in deliberately foolish execution of them, from which they immediately fall into semantic quotation marks.

== Voice acting ==
Vladimir Vysotsky acted as a dubbing actor in several cinematographic works. The first experience of this kind occurred while he was still studying at the Moscow Art Theater Studio School — in 1957, student Vysotsky participated in the voicing of the cartoon "Wonderer" directed by Alexander Ivanov. In the then popular animated film about the advantages and useful properties of corn included an episode with a chorus of weeds singing a song on the verses of Lev Pozdneyev and Vladimir Korkin and music by Aleksander Varlamov. According to Lyudmila Abramova, one of the voices in this chorus belonged to Vladimir Semyonovich. Ten years after "Wonderer", Vysotsky's voice was heard in the cartoon "Passion of Spies" — a parody of detective films. Especially for this work there was no recording — the director Yefim Gamburg sped up the previously recorded phonogram of Vysotsky's performance of someone else's song "Black Eyes" and put the resulting "contralto" into the mouth of a restaurant singer in one of the episodes.

In 1974, director Aleksander Bogolyubov, who was shooting the animated film "The Wizard of Emerald City", invited Veniamin Smekhov to play the role of Bastinda. The actor "Taganka" did not forget about his colleague in the theater and introduced the director to Vysotsky. The character of the wolf (Bastinda's servant) was invented by them during the work on the cartoon. The peculiarity of animation in this case manifested itself in the fact that first the character was voiced, and then the filming of puppet characters was superimposed on the voice. The recording was also subjected to technical correction — the timbre of the character was selected by changing the speed of the phonogram playback, as is often done in animation. Vysotsky's character appears in the fourth series of the cartoon — "The Kingdom of Bastinda". According to Mark Tsybulsky, a Vysotsky scholar, the actor coped well with working on this picture.

One of the most popular characters of Soviet animation —the wolf from the cartoon "Well, Just You Wait!"— could have spoken with Vysotsky's voice. The director Vyacheslav Kotyonochkin came to the Taganka Theatre before the start of work on the film and offered the role to Vysotsky. At first the actor refused because of his work, but later, after reading the script, he agreed. But in the past, shortly before the events of the plenum of the Central Committee of the Komsomol, someone called Vysotsky an "odious figure," and this led to the refusal to allow the artist to participate in the cartoon. Nevertheless, in the first series of "Well, wait!", filmed by Kotyonochkin (1969), a fragment of a melody from Vysotsky's song "If a friend was suddenly..." can be heard.

If thirty years ago I had started working on the film "Well, Just You Wait!" with Vysotsky as the wolf, it would have been a completely different film... And there's no question that it's worse or better. It's just a completely different movie. It just reaffirms that animated cinema is also a feature film.

In 1969, simultaneously with the filming of "Dangerous Tour", Vysotsky took part in a voice-over reading of the text for the documentary film Ilf and Petrov (Centrnauchfilm Studios), directed by Yevgeny Ostashenko. The name of the reader was not listed in the credits, and the audience had to recognize Vysotsky by his voice.

== Works in television plays ==
Vladimir Vysotsky's early acting career included participation in television plays. His first experience with television shooting in May 1961 was a production based on the novel "Eagle Steppe" by writer Mikhail Bubennov. The director of the television play was appointed Leonid Aristarkhovich Pchelkin. At the time of work on "Eagle Steppe" Pchelkin was not yet known as "Pchellini Leonid Patriarchovich", as he was respectfully called at backstage in the future, recognizing the merits of the field of television cinema: in 1961 in his creative baggage was only one television play, as well as participation as a second director in the film "Poem of the Sea". Rehearsals for the play were about a month on the stage of the Moscow Pushkin Drama Theater, filming was done in the studio on Shabolovka and on location. In 1988, the director recalled:

Although Volodya was a very young actor at that time, he had some inner strength and conviction. I remember that someone said: "Maybe he'll sing?" That's how the song was born in that scene. Evening scene: the collective farmers are sitting by the fire, and Volodya sings "White Snow...", accompanying himself on the guitar. He suggested this song himself. He sang so well and so intimately that he simply decorated this stage for us. Apart from that, he was involved in 1-2 more scenes. These were passable episodes, but Volodya practiced them with full creative dedication.

Yevgeny Urbansky, Tamara Lyakina, Vsevolod Platov, and Tamara Zyablova also acted in the teleplay. According to Mark Tsybulsky, a Vysotsky researcher, the work on which the teleplay was filmed was not even worth the paper it was written on, and was a typical example of socialist era prose.

Vysotsky's second television work in 1965 was the production of "Room", based on a play by Boris Yermolayev, a graduate of VGIK. The main roles in the television play were played by actors of the Taganka Theatre Lyudmila Komarovskaya and Dalvin Shcherbakov, Veniamin Smekhov, Lyudmila Abramova, Eduard Arutyunyan also took part in it, and the director was again Leonid Pchelkin. The plot of the play was uncomplicated — "two people in love, no apartment; but now it has appeared, and friends have noticed it...". Vysotsky played the role of an artist, a negative character, his wife created the image of a stewardess in love with him. Eduard Harutyunyan, speaking on behalf of the narrator, performed excerpts from Vysotsky's songs "Bolshoy Karetny" ("Where are your seventeen years?...") and "I lived with my mother and father...". The "Room" was shown on television on July 3, 1965, and, as the participants of the screening recall, it did not bring them (the actors of the play) "many happy impressions". The question of the preservation of the recordings of both television performances with Vysotsky remains open.

== Unplayed roles ==
In the early 1960s, Vysotsky ironically called himself a photo actor in private conversations. He emphasized that his "participation" in films was often limited to photo tests in makeup and costumes of characters. Later the situation began to change, nevertheless unrealized projects and unplayed roles made up a significant part of his film biography. For example, Vysotsky was twice invited to play the role of Ostap Bender. In the first case it was a picture of Mikhail Schweitzer's "The Golden Calf". After watching the director's test shots, all the candidates chose Sergei Yursky; Vysotsky, according to Schweitzer, was "too dramatic" on screen. The second opportunity to play a great combiner appeared in Vladimir Semyonovich in Leonid Gaidai's tape "The Twelve Chairs". As recalled Natalia Krachkovskaya, who passed the film auditions in a pair with Vysotsky, he was "a great partner", his work liked the director. But embody on the screen the image of Bender actor did not happen, according to Gaidai, on the eve of filming was a breakdown: "Vysotsky suddenly fell ill and for a long time. We have a plan "burned", so we invited Archil Gomiashvili".

Twice Vladimir Semyonovich was invited to film auditions and Andrei Tarkovsky —in the film "Ivanovo Childhood" Vladimir Semyonovich was offered the role of Captain Kholin, in "Andrei Rublev"— the role of Centurion Stepan. In neither of the films did the cooperation between the actor and the director take place. Georgy Natanson offered Vysotsky the role of Electron in the melodrama "Once More About Love". According to the screenwriter Edward Radzinsky, the auditions were successful, the actor easily found a common language with the actress of the role of Natasha — Tatiana Doronina, but his candidacy was rejected by the head of the creative association Ivan Pyryev.

The list of roles not played by the actor, also included General Khludov from the two-part film "The Flight", based on the works of Mikhail Bulgakov, and Peter from the film by Larisa Shepitko "You and Me". As told by Yuri Vizbor, who in the movie Shepitko played the role of Sasha, "tedious and nervous path of negotiations, photoprobas, kinoprobas led Volodya to failure. Unfortunately, so it happened and in the picture "You and I". Director George Yungvald-Khilkevich, beginning production of the film "D'Artagnan and the Three Musketeers", hoped that the main role will get Vysotsky. However, work on the adaptation of the Duma's novel coincided with the actor's participation in the film "The place to meet can not be changed. According to Mikhail Boyarsky, the role of d'Artagnan was offered to him after Vysotsky refused.

In the late 1960s, Eldar Ryazanov began preparations for the filming of "Cyrano de Bergerac", based on the play by Edmond Rostand. The director expected Yevgeny Yevtushenko to play the role of the Parisian poet and wit. Vysotsky, having learned about the planned work, expressed his desire to pass the film tests, to which Ryazanov, at that time little familiar with his work, replied: "You see, Volodya, I do not want to shoot the actor in this role, I want to shoot the poet. Later the director admitted that his answer contained "incredible tactlessness". Nevertheless, Vladimir Semyonovich came to the studio and rehearsed "very passionately, very temperamentally". Record of film tests both Vysotsky and Yevtushenko, has not survived, there are only photos of candidates in the makeup of Cyrano de Bergerac. The project itself was not realized, but the related theme was continued a few years later, when Ryazanov was presented with a collection of tapes with recordings of songs by Vysotsky. After many hours of listening, the director called Vladimir Semyonovich and said: "You are a wonderful poet, you are beautiful. When Vysotsky asked if Ryazanov would now cast him in the role of Cyrano, the director replied, "I would do it now".

In the list of failed works of the actor included and the role of a young hussar Eugene Krestovsky from the film "The Land of Sannikov". Vysotsky showed himself well at the auditions and prepared for the film three songs: "White Silence", "Ballad of the abandoned ship" and "Capricious Horses". In addition, the tape was supposed to participate Marina Vlady, who was approved for the role of the bride of scientist Ilyin. However, the general director of "Mosfilm" Nikolai Sizov opposed the candidacy of Vysotsky in "Sannikov's Land". As a result, Krestovsky played Oleg Dal. Songs Vysotsky in the picture did not enter. Vladimir Semyonovich told about this story in a letter to Stanislav Govorukhin as follows:

Approved me in the picture "The Land of Sannikov", made an offer, signed a contract, took tickets, I ran with a visa for Marina, release in the theater pulled out with blood from the director and Lyubimov, and the day before departure Sizov — director of "Mosfilm" — said: "It's not necessary." "Why?" — asked the directors. — "And not necessary, and that's all." <...> We just need to break the opinion that has arisen from somewhere, that I can not be filmed, that I am an odious person.

== Scriptwriting and scriptwriting outlines ==
While still a student, Vladimir Semyonovich became a recognized author of scripts for the numerous kapustniks often held at the Moscow Art Theater Studio School. Later, he repeatedly tried his hand at writing scenes for films and full screenplays. The first such experience occurred in 1966 when he participated in the shooting of "The Last Hustler". "Lecture on Dinosaurs" (and presumably "The Gypsy Woman's Fortune Telling"), script outlines of episodes that Vysotsky proposed for the picture, were not accepted by the film group.

At the turn of 1966 and 1967, Karina Filippova, who knew Vysotsky well, showed him her friend Dina Kalinovskaya's monopoem "The Ballad of Recklessness". At first the actor did not like the play, but three days later he called from Odessa, changed his mind, and on his return met with the author and offered to work together: he would write some songs for the picture, himself would act, and the co-author of the script would invite Stanislav Govorukhin. The friends gave their consent, some time was worked on the project of the film. There were two new working titles: "One" and "Remember, the war happened in the forty-first ...". But even at the stage of the script application sent to the Odessa Film Studio, the work was not approved by the State Cinema of Ukraine. According to Filippova and Kalinovskaya, the refusal was due to the fact that in the script the hero "stood up to the collective". In their memoirs, they talked about the memorized line from Vysotsky's unfinished song about the dog for this role — "I really need Bim, I need him..." ("I need Bim"). According to Vysotsky scholar Mark Tsybulsky, the song was not heard anywhere else; it is not found in the drafts either.

Valery Zolotukhin's diaries contain a record of Vysotsky reading him the script "The Amazing Story of a Very Young Man from Leningrad and a Girl from Cherbourg" on May 26, 1969. Different versions of the autograph of the script are preserved in the archives of the poet's mother, Nina Maximovna Vysotskaya, and in the archives of the Lenfilm studio. According to Sergei Zhiltsov, the script was created with the expectation that Marina Vlady and the author would participate in the future film. There is also the manuscript of the short screenplay "Where is the Center?", presumably dated by Sergei Zhiltsov 1969-1970, although the manuscript contains a different date — 1975 (according to Mark Tsybulsky, the assumptions are reasonable). In RGALI there is a script sketch "Dialogue about Sport", written for the film "Sport, Sport, Sport" (1970). The scene describes a conversation between two poets about sports. According to Zhiltsov, the episode was created with the expectation that Vysotsky would participate in it, but it was not proposed for the film. In 1972, Vysotsky submitted the script "Somehow Everything Happened..." (presumably written by him in 1971-1972) to Mosfilm's 6th Creative Association. The studio's art committee rejected the script about a spacesuit test, although the author claimed that the image was particularly relevant after the death of three cosmonauts in June 1971.

In 1974, the Leningrad factory "Russian Gems" decided to precede the release of a series of zodiac jewelry with a promotional film. The USSR Goskino sent an application to the Leningrad Documentary Film Studio. The editor of the studio's advertising association, Sergei Bondarchik, first offered Vysotsky to write a song for the planned film, and then the studio signed a contract with the poet to write the script. The filming was entrusted to director Viktor Petrov, who began preparing "Astrological Signs" in December 1974, and in March 1975 finished work on the three-minute film and submitted the first copy to the State Cinema for approval. Officials saw the film as a cromolya: the lion —the sign of the zodiac— was red, which, in their opinion, associated the Soviet government with a predator. They also disliked the participation of the "disgraced poet" in the making of the film. After changing the episode (instead of the lion appeared) in the summer of 1975, the film was released on the screens of the country. It was shown in cinemas before the sessions and had a successful rental fate. At the same time, director Viktor Petrov was suspended for several years from any serious work at Lennauchfilm. The question of the preservation of copies of Signs of the Zodiac remains open.

A few days before the end of 1978, Vysotsky told Eduard Volodarsky the story of General Voitenko, who had been captured during the war. Volodarsky was interested in the tragic and sometimes funny odyssey, which Vysotsky wrote down in the retired general's words, as a basis for the screenplay. On January 1, 1979, Volodarsky and Vysotsky began work, and as a result of their "twenty-four hours a day" joint activities, the work entitled "Holidays after the War" ("Vienna Holidays") was completed on January 6. Friends showed the script to many directors of the USSR, but all of them wrung their hands and argued that the script was "impassable": it would not pass the censorship. Marina Vlady took the text to Paris, translated it into French and showed it to Gerard Depardieu. He liked the script so much that at a meeting with Vysotsky he expressed his desire to do the film without royalties. The actor Daniel Olbrychski reacted in the same way, but no producer was found for the movie.

In 1979, Igor Shevtsov, who was working on the script for the film "Green Van", asked Vysotsky to compose songs for the film. The project interested Vladimir Semyonovich, and he agreed to become the director and co-author of the screenplay of Kozachinsky's story. Joint activities were not easy, according to Gennady Poloka, certain disagreements were connected with a different world view of the co-authors: "If Vysotsky had been the director, the picture would have been more sentimental and touching". In the rough sketches have survived records indicating that Vladimir Semyonovich planned to play in "Green Van" Handsome; the role of Ermakov he wanted to offer to Ivan Bortnik. For the film, Vysotsky wrote the song "We rode the whole country..."

In the second half of January 1980, the finished script was submitted to the studio's artistic council. Waiting for the verdict dragged on, and in April Vysotsky told Shevtsov that he would probably give up work on "Green Van": "They won't let us shoot what we wanted". In June came the news that Vysotsky had agreed to direct the picture, its artistic director being Poloka. The script itself, according to the decision of the commission, needed revision. The start of production was planned for September of the same year. Until the beginning of the shooting Vysotsky did not live. The script, written by him together with Shevtsov, probably did not survive. The movie "Green Van", shot in the Odessa Film Studio in 1983 according to Shevtsov's original production version, had nothing to do with Vysotsky.

== Critics of Vysotsky's film work ==
Soviet critics of the 1960s and 1970s did not ignore Vysotsky's film roles, and the actor's name often appeared in critical articles and reviews. However, according to Vysotsky scholar Elena Kuznetsova, there were relatively few analytical materials that seriously examined his work in a particular film. Perhaps a certain superficiality of assessments, schematism instead of detailed analysis was related to the public perception of cinema as a mass art, and this "created the illusion of being able to think about it without relying on specialized knowledge" (in contrast to "elite theater criticism", which in its publications on Vysotsky's stage pictures sought a deep art-historical analysis). Nevertheless, even during Vladimir Semyonovich's lifetime, in 1975, Iskusstvo Publishing House published 150,000 copies of the book "Actors of the Soviet Cinema" with a detailed article "Vladimir Vysotsky" by Irina Rubanova, which traced his creative biography since 1965; for several decades these materials were considered the most complete study of the actor's cinematic work.

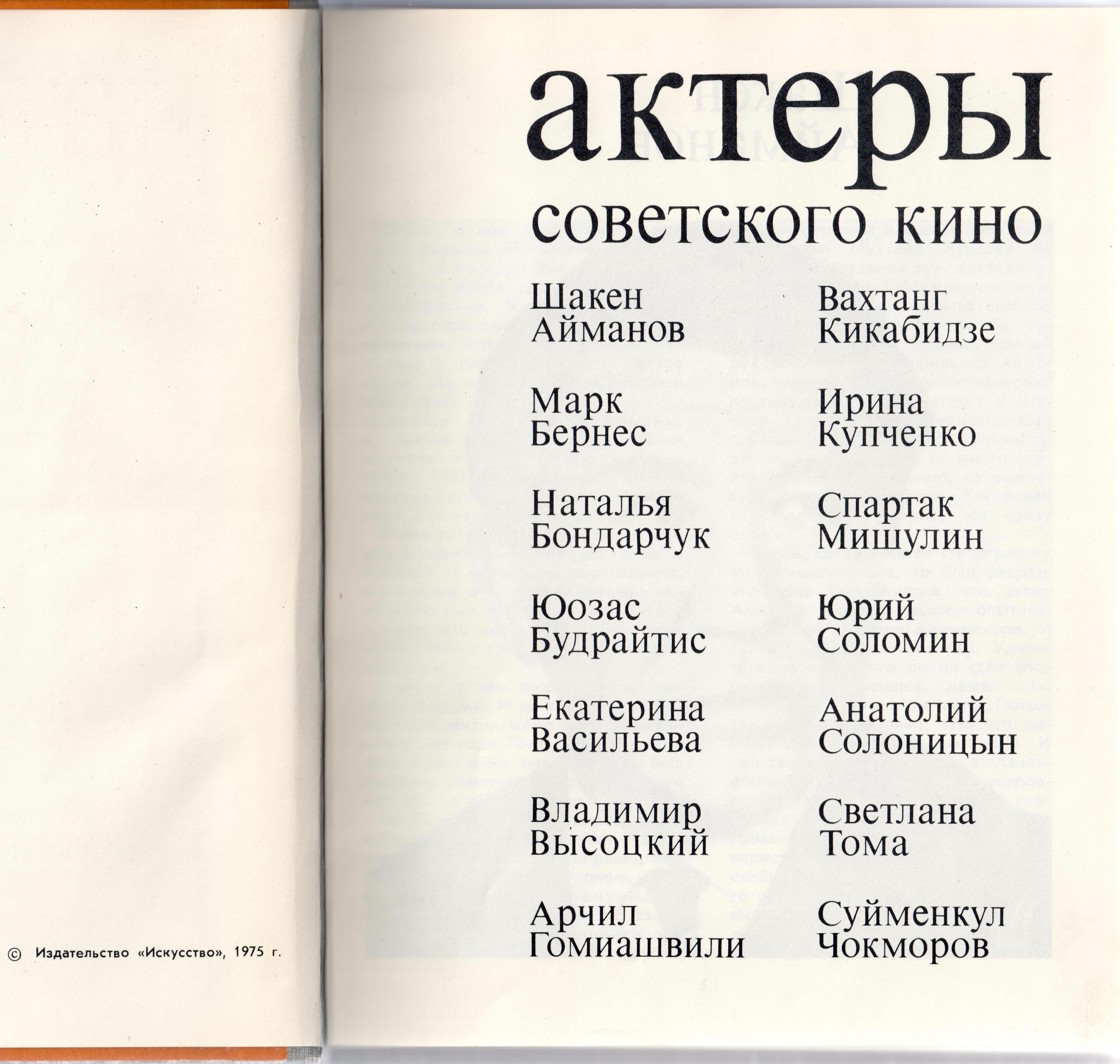
Cover of "Actors of the Soviet Cinema", published in 1975

The first mentions in the press about Vysotsky as an actor were brief: in the publication devoted to the release of the film "713 Requests Permission to Land" his character was written as a "good little man", and in the reviews of the film "The Cook" critics included his character Andrei Pchyolka in the general series of actors, without even mentioning the name of the performer. A certain interest of film critics in Vysotsky was marked after the release of the tape "Vertical"; however, the appearance of his name in publications was more often associated with songs than with acting skills. Thus, V. Baranovsky wrote in the Odessa edition of "Znamya Kommunizma" (July 16, 1967) about the "philosophicality, tact and taste" present in Vysotsky's songs, included in the picture of the mountains; after seeing "Vertical", according to the author of the article, "in the memory remained only songs or music". Despite its limited distribution, the tape "Brief Encounters", in which Vysotsky played the role of a geologist, was quite popular. Opinions about this character ranged from "he is charming, this Maxim" ("Ulyanovskaya Pravda," 1968, February 17) to "just a character with a guitar humming some unforgettable songs" ("Iskusstvo Kino," 1968, № 10).

Reviewers' comments on Vysotsky's character —Lieutenant Brusentsov— from the film "Two Comrades Were Serving" were equally diverse. If the film historians V. Solomatin and Mark Zak considered the work of Vladimir Semyonovich to be of high quality, but traditional, without any professional innovations, the art historian Natalia Krymova, on the contrary, noted that the image of Brusentsov, created by bypassing the stamps, was a demonstration of the magnitude of Vysotsky's acting talent. Very serious analysis appeared after the release of the film "The Bad Good Man", and about the character of Vysotsky —zoologist von Koren— wrote not only film historians, but also theater historians — Konstantin Rudnitsky, Alexander Svobodin and others, which in itself, according to Elena Kuznetsova, was "an indicator of quality: theater historians "take up the pen" only when we are talking about highly artistic material".

All of Vysotsky's subsequent cinematic works were inevitably received by the press, and the interpretations of the images he created sometimes became the subject of polemics. This was the case, for example, with the "shabby seducer" Boris Ilyich from the picture "The One and Only...". Critics perceived the hero as a "defeated demon", then read the role as a "parody of provincial demonism". In the image of a street singer from "The Flight of Mr. McKinley" almost none of the authors of publications failed to notice the key hypostasis — the poet; at the same time, the magazine "The Art of Cinema" pointed out that the inclusion of the hero-singer in the plot of the picture was made for the sake of "a selfish attempt to increase the chances of success". Quite a lot of reviews caused and the release of the film "The Meeting Place Cannot Be Changed". Almost universally noted acting work Vysotsky, whose play was compared "with the school of the old Moscow Art Theater". Even the newspaper "Pravda"(1979, December 17) wrote about Captain Zheglov as an "absolute success of the film", which at that time "actually meant official recognition" of Vysotsky as a film actor. However, according to Elena Kuznetsova, "Vysotsky himself did not have a chance to be recognised".

== Bibliography ==
- Андреев Н. Жизнь Высоцкого. — М.: Доброе дело, 2015. — 672 p. — ISBN 978-5-8493-0327-7.
- Новейшая история отечественного кино. 1986—2000. В 7 т. Part 2. Кино и контекст / составитель Л. Аркус. — СПб.: Сеанс, 2002. — V. 4. 1986—1988. — 760 p. — ISBN 978-5-901586-04-4.
- Бакин В. Владимир Высоцкий без мифов и легенд. — М.: Эксмо, 2010. — 688 p. — ISBN 978-5-699-41173-3.
- Бакин В. Владимир Высоцкий. Жизнь после смерти. — М.: Алгоритм, 2011. — 500 p. — (Лучшие биографии). — ISBN 978-5-457-51403-4.
- Блинова А. И. Экран и Владимир Высоцкий (Размышления об актёрском мастерстве, о ролях, о среде) / науч. ред. О. В. Тенейшвили. — М.: Всероссийский институт переподготовки и повышения квалификации работников кинематографии при Правительстве Российской Федерации, 1992. — 208 p.
- Высоцкий В. 130 песен для кино / сост. и примеч. А. Е. Крылова. — М.: Киноцентр, 1991. — 304 p. — 100 000 copies.
- Высоцкий В. С. Сочинения. В 2 т. / Подготовка текста и комментарии А. Крылова. — М.: Художественная литература, 1993. — V. II. — 544 p. — ISBN 978-5-280-02945-3.
- Высоцкий В. Собрание сочинений в пяти томах / сост. и коммент. С. Жильцова. — Тула: Тулица, 1993. — V. 1. Стихи и песни. 1960—1967. — 401 p. — ISBN 978-5-86152-003-4.
- Высоцкий В. Собрание сочинений в пяти томах / сост. и коммент. С. Жильцова. — Тула: Тулица, 1995. — V. 2. Стихи и песни. 1968—1972. — 542 p. — ISBN 978-5-86152-004-1.
- Высоцкий В. Собрание сочинений в пяти томах / сост. и коммент. С. Жильцова. — Тула: Тулица, 1998. — V. 5. Проза. Драматургия. Дневники. Письма. — 600 p. — ISBN 978-5-86152-007-2.
- Демидова А. С. Мой Высоцкий. — М.: Эксмо, 2016. — 122 p. — ISBN 978-5-699-91510-1.
- Всё не так, ребята…: Владимир Высоцкий в воспоминаниях друзей и коллег / сост. Игорь Кохановский. — М.: АСТ, 2017. — 512 p. — ISBN 978-5-17-098692-7.
- Золотухин В. С. Секрет Высоцкого. Мы часто пели «Баньку» вместе. — М.: Алгоритм, 2013. — 351 p. — (Жизнь в искусстве). — 2000 copies. — ISBN 978-5-4438-0386-9.
- Кузнецова Е. Владимир Высоцкий в кинокритике: Образ, восприятие, оценка // Мир Высоцкого. Исследования и материалы. Вып. V / сост. А. Е. Крылов и В. Ф. Щербакова. — Ком. по культуре Москвы, Рос. культур. центр-музей В. С. Высоцкого. — М.: ГКЦМ В. С. Высоцкого, 2001. — 720 p. — ISBN 978-5-93038-007-1.
- Высоцкий. Исследования и материалы. В 4 т. / сост. Ю. А. Куликов. — М.: ГКЦМ В. С. Высоцкого, 2013. — V. 3, book 1, part 2. Молодость. — 336 p. — ISBN 978-5-901070-17-8.
- Летопись российского кино. 1966—1980: Научная монография / отв. ред. В. И. Фомин. — М.: РООИ «Реабилитация» Канон+, 2015. — 688 p. — ISBN 978-5-88373-445-7.
- Новиков В. И. Высоцкий / науч. конс. А. Е. Крылов и И. И. Роговой. — М.: Молодая гвардия, 2013. — 492 p. — (Жизнь замечательных людей). — ISBN 978-5-235-03554-6.
- Спутницкая Н. Владимир Высоцкий // Актёрская энциклопедия. Кино России. Выпуск 2 / сост. Лев Парфёнов, отв. ред. М. Кузнецова. — М.: Научно-исследовательский институт киноискусства, 2008. — 227 p. — ISBN 978-5-91524-003-1.
- Владимир Высоцкий в кино / сост. И. И. Роговой. — М.: Союз кинематографистов СССР. Всесоюзное ТПО «Киноцентр», 1990. — 224 p. — 400 000 copies.
- Перевозчиков В. Правда смертного часа. — М.: Вагриус, 2003. — 430 p. — ISBN 978-5-264-00837-5.
- Рубанова И. Владимир Высоцкий // Актёры советского кино. Issue 11 / сост. Л. Польская и М. Хаджимурадова. — М.: Искусство, 1975. — 223 p. — 150 000 copies.
- Рубанова И. Владимир Высоцкий. — М.: Всесоюзное бюро пропаганды киноискусства, 1983. — 64 p. — 300 000 copies.
- Вспоминая Владимира Высоцкого / сост. А. Н. Сафонов. — М.: Сов. Россия, 1989. — 384 p. — ISBN 978-5-268-00829-6.
- Сушко Ю. Высоцкий. На краю. — М.: АСТ, 2016. — 573 p. — ISBN 978-5-17-094287-9.
- Владимир Высоцкий: монологи со сцены / лит. запись О. Л. Терентьева. — Харьков: Фолио; АСТ, 2008. — 208 p. — ISBN 978-5-237-04172-9.
- Цыбульский М. Владимир Высоцкий и его «кино». — Нижний Новгород: Деком, 2016. — 464 p. — (Имена). — ISBN 978-5-89533-355-6.
- Цыбульский М. Владимир Высоцкий: Ещё не всё… / гл. ред. Я. И. Гройсман. — Нижний Новгород: Деком, 2017. — 272 p. — (Имена). — ISBN 978-5-89533-385-3.
- Цыбульский М. Владимир Высоцкий в Ленинграде. — СПб.: Студия «НП-Принт», 2013. — 248 p. — ISBN 978-5-91542-210-9.
- Цыбульский М. Жизнь и путешествия В. Высоцкого. — Ростов-на-Дону: Феникс, 2004. — 640 p. — ISBN 978-5-222-04826-9.
- Шилина О. Ю. Владимир Высоцкий и музыка: «Я изучил все ноты от и до...». — Композитор, 2008. — 216 p. — ISBN 978-5-7379-0377-0.
- Владимир Семенович Высоцкий. Что? Где? Когда? Библиографический справочник (1960—1990 г.г.) / авт.-сост. А. С. Эпштейн. — Харьков: Прогресс; М.: Студия-Л, 1992. — 399 p. — 50 000 copies. — ISBN 978-5-87258-006-5.
- Киеня В. Киносудьба Владимира Высоцкого: фильмы, роли, песни. — Гомель: Полеспечать, 1992. — 9000 copies.
