= The Bad Good Man =

- Directed by: Iosif Kheifits
- Written by: Iosif Kheifits
- Starring: Oleg Dahl; Vladimir Vysotsky
- Music by: Nadezhda Simonyan
- Production company: Lenfilm
- Release date: 10 December 1973
- Running time: 1h 38min
- Country: Soviet Union
- Language: Russian

The Bad Good Man (Russian: Плохой хороший человек, romanized: Plokhoy khoroshiy chelovek) is a 1973 Soviet historical drama film based on the novella The Duel by Anton Chekhov.

== Plot ==
The film’s plot centers on the intense ideological clash between two strong personalities, Laevsky (Oleg Dal) and von Koren (Vladimir Vysotsky), each holding distinct life philosophies. Von Koren views Laevsky as the embodiment of human vices, while Laevsky sees von Koren as someone capable of committing cruel acts in the name of abstract ideals, potentially even eliminating those deemed unfit for a new social order. Their mutual friend, Dr. Samoylenko, shares Laevsky’s concerns about von Koren’s harsh principles. For a while, von Koren’s ideas about punishing morally corrupt people remain theoretical, until he makes a disparaging remark about Laevsky’s “hopeless situation,” prompting an angry Laevsky to retort, which von Koren interprets as a “duel challenge” – a comment made half in jest. Despite despising von Koren, Laevsky accepts the duel.

Neither the duelists nor their seconds truly understand the rules, fumbling through what they remember from classic literature. Beforehand, von Koren confidently predicts that Laevsky will shoot into the air, a prediction that proves correct. Von Koren himself claims he wouldn’t waste time risking his life for Laevsky, but goaded by the seconds’ sentimental appeals for reconciliation, he aims his shot at Laevsky, only to miss due to the startled cry of a deacon hiding nearby. This close brush with death deeply changes Laevsky, inspiring him to work hard to repay debts and improve his life, while his wife shifts her focus from social gatherings to managing their household. However, von Koren remains skeptical, doubting the sincerity or longevity of Laevsky’s transformation. He also begins to question his own purpose and the righteousness of his mission to “improve humanity” after his failed attempt in the duel.

== Cast ==
- Oleg Dahl - Layevski
- Vladimir Vysotsky - Von Koren
- Lyudmila Maksakova - Nadezhda Fyodorovna
- Anatoli Papanov - Dr. Samoylenko
- Georgy Korolchuk - Dyacon Pobedov
- Anatoliy Azo - Kirilin
- Ashot Melikjanyan as Achmianov
- Lyubov Malinovskaya as Bityugova
- Yuriy Medvedev as Sheshkovsky
- Andrei Apsolon

== Awards ==
- 1974 - The "Charybdis" prize for the best performance of the male role to Vladimir Vysotsky at the V festival of Nations in Taormina, Italy.
