= Brief Encounters (film) =

- Original Russian film poster
- Directed by: Kira Muratova
- Written by: Kira Muratova; Leonid Zhukhovitsky
- Produced by: A. Serdykov
- Starring: Nina Ruslanova; Vladimir Vysotskiy; Kira Muratova; Yelena Bazilskaya; Olga Vikland; Aleksey Glazyrin
- Cinematography: Gennadi Karyuk
- Edited by: O. Kharakova
- Music by: Oleg Karavaychuk
- Production company: Odessa Film Studio
- Release date: 1967
- Running time: 91 minutes
- Country: Soviet Union
- Language: Russian

Brief Encounters (Russian: Короткие встречи, romanized: Korotkiye vstrechi) is a 1967 Soviet romantic comedy-drama film directed by Kira Muratova.

Two women, employee and her housekeeper are unknowingly both in love with the same man, played by singer and actor Vladimir Vysotsky.

== Plot ==
After leaving their native village, Nadya and her friend travel to the big city, seeking new opportunities. Along the way, Nadya secures a job in a tea house where she meets Maksim, a charming and educated young geologist. With his adventurous profession, romantic demeanor, and guitar-playing, Maksim captivates Nadya, and she quickly becomes enamored with him. However, Maksim already has a romantic relationship with Valentina Ivanovna (Valya), a district council employee, whose pragmatic and organized life contrasts sharply with Nadya’s youthful idealism.

The narrative alternates between Nadya’s story and Valya’s perspective, who only sees Maksim sporadically due to his expeditions, leaving her emotionally strained. When Nadya leaves the tea shop and ends up in Valya's town, their paths cross in an unexpected way. Valya, unaware that Nadya also loves Maksim, hires her as a maid and even offers her a place to stay. While living under the same roof, Nadya becomes a quiet observer of Valya’s strained relationship with Maksim, who continues to come and go unpredictably, causing tension and frustration.

Maksim calls to say he will return, and Valya, despite her anger, eagerly prepares for his arrival. Realizing the depth of Valya’s love for Maksim, Nadya sets the table with festive dishes, symbolically marking the end of her involvement. She quietly leaves the house and their lives, choosing to walk away and not interfere with their bond.

== Cast ==
- Nina Ruslanova – Nadia
- Vladimir Vysotsky – Maxim
- Kira Muratova – Valentina
- Lydia Bazilskaya – Lyubka
- Olga Viklandt – hairdresser
- Alexey Glazyrin – Semyon Semenovich, geologist
- Valery Isakov – Styopa, barman
- Svetlana Nemolyaeva – Lelia, manicurist
- Lyudmila Ivanova – Lidia Sergeevna, fortune-telling neighbor

== Awards ==
1987: Nika Award — Nina Ruslanova for Best Actress

== See also ==
- Vladimir Vysotsky in movies
