= Union of Cinematographers of the Russian Federation =

Russian umbrella trade union for film industry workers

The Union of Cinematographers of the Russian Federation (Russian: Союз кинематографистов России), also known as the Russian Filmmakers' Union, is the trade union of cinematographers, actors, and other professionals of Russian cinema. Founded in 1991, it was preceded by the Guild of Actors of Soviet Cinema in 1988, which became the Russian Film Actors Guild.

== History ==
In 1988 the Guild of Actors of Soviet Cinema was formed, headed by Evgeny Zharikov. Founder Drapeko Elena Grigoryevna (born 1948) was vice-president. In 1991 this was renamed the Russian Film Actors Guild.

The Union of Cinematographers of the Russian Federation was founded on 28 February 1990. The organization charter was adopted on 30 November 1991. It manages the Central House of Cinema in Moscow.

Sergei Zhigunov was president of the Russian Film Actors Guild, possibly from 2000 to 2005.

== Structure ==
The Union of Cinematographers of the Russian Federation, also known as Russian Filmmakers’ Union or UC of Russia, is a non-governmental organisation. As of 2022 the chairman is Nikita Mikhalkov.

The union comprises several smaller unions or guilds, grouped by profession, including:

- Russian Film Actors Guild
- Russian Guild of Film Critics
- Russian Guild of Film Directors
- Guild of screenwriters
- Guild of make-up artists
- Guild of cinematographers
- Guild of artists
- Guild of screen composers
- Guild of producers and distributors
- Guild of sound engineers

== See also ==
- Russian films
