= Matlyuba Alimova =

Uzbek actress

- Born: August 12, 1954 (age 71); Andijan, Uzbek SSR, USSR
- Occupation: actress
- Years active: 1976-2016

Matlyuba Alimova (married name Ahmetova; born on August 12, 1954, in Andijan) is a Soviet, Uzbek, and Russian film actress.

== Biography ==
She was born into a family of Uzbek and a Russian. Her mother was from Ufa, where Farhat Alimov served his conscription. Matlyuba entered the Russian State University of Cinematography(now: Gerasimov Institute of Cinematography) in Boris Babochkin's class, but after the first year of studies, he expelled Matlyuba and three other students citing 'professional incompetence.' However, shortly after, Boris Andreevich died, and the four students were reinstated. She graduated from the Acting Faculty of VGIK in 1978 (under the guidance of Alexey Batalov). Since 1978, she has been an actress at the 'Uzbekfilm' studio. She made her film debut while still a student - in 1975, playing a small role in the movie 'The Ballad of the White Horse'. Her role in the four-part film 'The Gypsy' (1979), where Matlyuba played Nastya, a gypsy passionately but unrequitedly in love with the main character, brought her fame; this was followed by a sequel, 'The Return of Budulai' (1985).

In the 1980s, she was actively involved in filming, in high demand. However, with the collapse of the Soviet film system, roles became scarce, and in the 1990s, Matlyuba was forced to return to her homeland - Uzbekistan, where she engaged in the restoration of Bukhara and Shakhrisabz embroideries.

In the 2000s, she played several minor roles in films and TV series: "Ballads of Hussars" (2005-2007), 'Law & Order: Division of Operational Investigations - 1,' 'Taras Bulba,' 'Gift of Fate,' 'Forensic Experts,' 'Fly Agarics,' and others. In 2004, she moved to Moscow. In 2011, she returned to Tashkent. The actress turned to the Christian faith - largely due to personal life setbacks. 'If it weren't for spiritual life, I would have either drowned myself in alcohol or hanged myself,' she admitted. She lived in the Sretensky Monastery in Moscow, whose abbot, Tikhon, graduated from the scriptwriting faculty of VGIK in 1982. Matlyuba frequently communicates with her fellow student Leonid Kayurov, who also turned to the church and became a deacon".

== Personal life ==
Matlyuba Alimova was married once. Her husband was director Murat Akhmetov. They met at VGIK and lived together for several years. The marriage did not work out due to the incredibly hot-tempered and jealous nature of the spouse. The couple had no children.

== Filmography ==
She played many roles during her career:

- 1979 — "Kichik fojialar"(Small tragedies) — Laura
- 1979 — "Loʻli"(Gypsy) — Nastya
- 1980 — "Sohil boʻyida"(On the beach)-Malika
- 1981 — "Sizlar bilan yana men…"(I'm with you again) — Tanya
- 1982 — "Vasiliy Buslayev"(Vasiliy Buslayev) — Irina,
- 1982 — "Yuqori qorli choʻqqida uchrashuv"(Meeting on a high snowy peak) — Zebo
- 1983 — "Yulduzli yigit haqida ertak"(A tale about a star boy)
- 1983 — "Qobuldagi issiq yoz"(Hot summer in Kabul)
- 1984 — "Fraglar"
- 1985 — "Budulayning qaytishi"(The return of Budulai)— Nastya
- 1986 — "Boʻlmagan narsa haqida"(About something that didn't happen) — Matluba
- 1989 — "Shoqollar"(Jackals)
- 1989 — "Katta urushdagi kichik odam"(A small man in a big war)
- 1990 — "Sharq yoʻlagi yoki Reket"(Eastern Corridor or Racket) — Linda
- 1991 — "Yovvoyi dala"(Wild field) — Fotima
- 1992 — "Ular"(They are)
- 1992 — "Snayper"(Sniper)
- 1992 — "Fir’avn kashfiyotchisi"(Discoverer of Pharaoh)
- 1993 — "Qizil poyezd"(Red train)
- 2002 — "Oʻrtoq Boykenjayev"(Comrade Boykenjayev)
- 2005 — "Gusarlar haqida ballada"(A ballad about hussars) — loʻli Zara
- 2009 — "Taras Bulba" — tatar-xizmatkor Eljbeti
