= Central House of Cinema =

Cinema and museum in Moscow, Russia

Central House of Cinema'
- Центра́льный Дом кино́ (ЦДК)
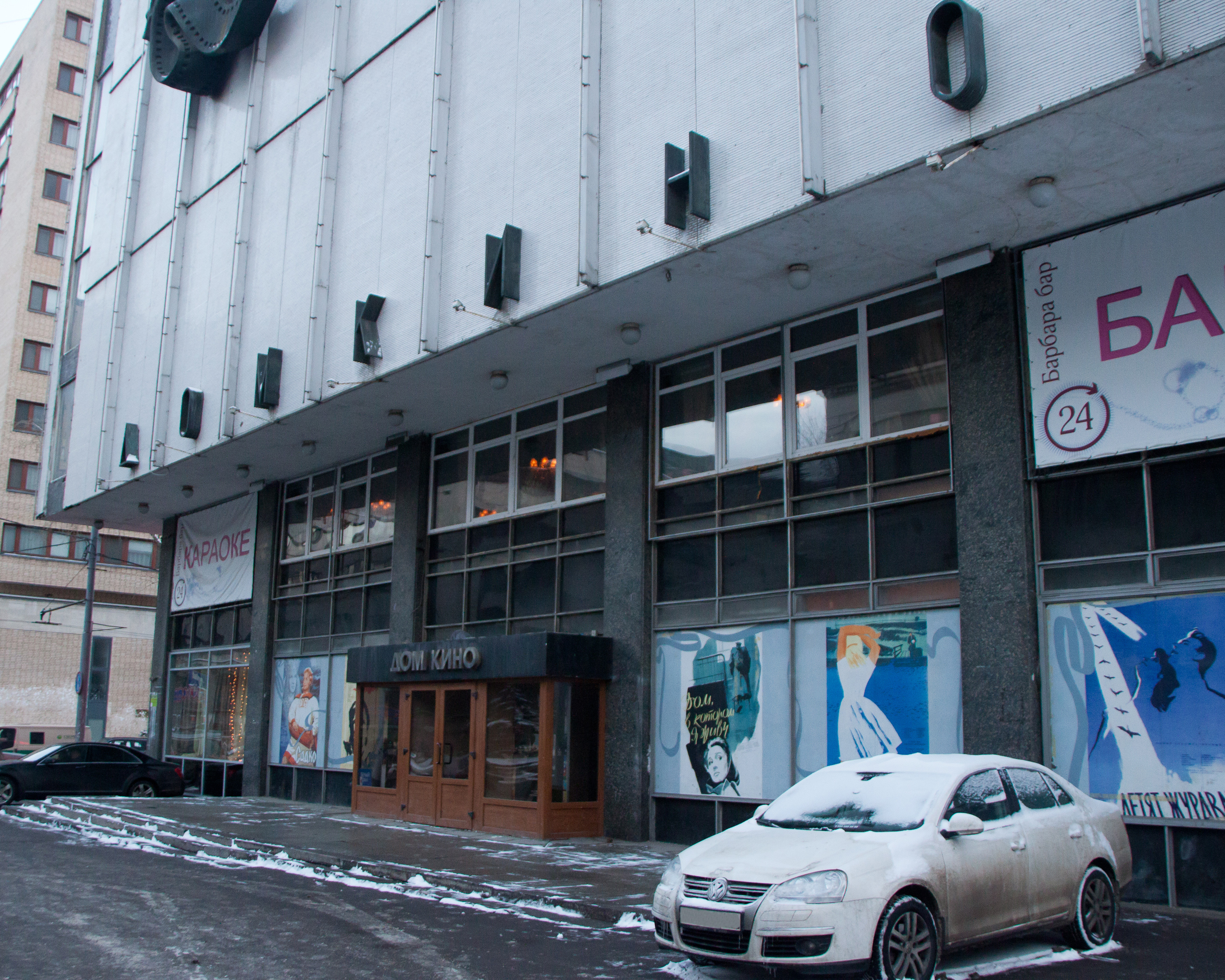
- Central entrance in 2013
- Interactive map of Central House of Cinema'
- Address: Moscow; Russia
- Coordinates: 55.772036°N 37.587946°E
- Owner: Union of Cinematographers of the Russian Federation
- Type: cinema

Construction
- Opened: 1934-05-04
- Architects: Vladimir Serotzinsky, Eugene Stamo

Website
- unikino.ru

Central House of Cinema (CDK) is a movie theater in Moscow, Russia, established in 1934 and currently managed by the Union of Cinematographers of the Russian Federation. CDK is a venue for film premieres, as well as open talks, artistic encounters, conferences, etc.

== History ==
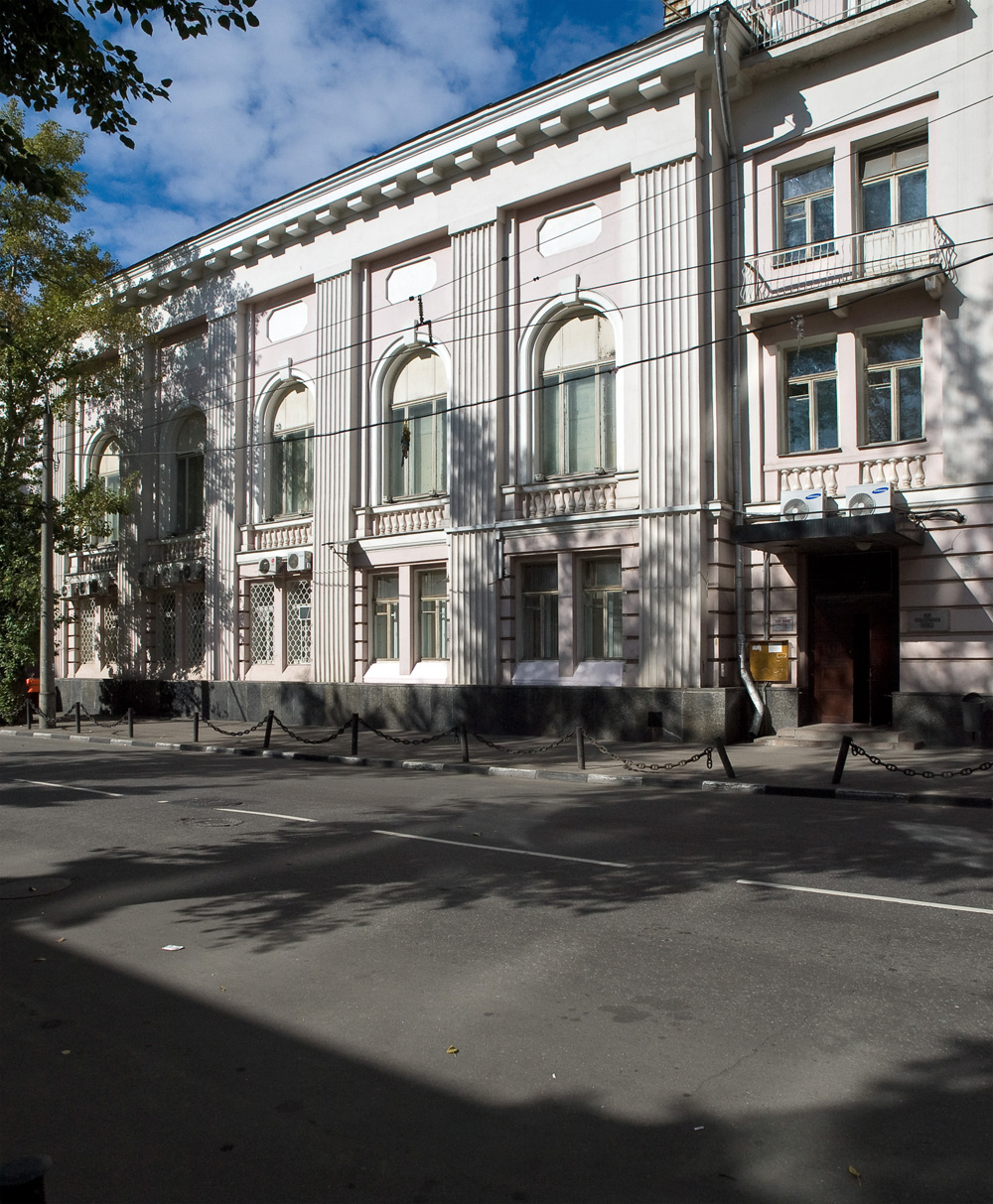
The original building of the Cinema house, arch. Vladimir Serotzinsky

=== Construction ===
In 1908, an Alexeevsky people’s house was opened on the site of the modern CDK. It was intended as a cultural complex for the workers, sponsored and managed by the Moscow Temperance Society. Muscovites and their family members went there to watch theater shows, open readings, art and physical classes. After the Russian Revolution, the building was given to the Soviet administration for offices.

In the early 1930s, Sergei Eisenstein put forward the idea to establish a cinema house in Moscow. The old building was reconstructed and reopened in 1934, its seating capacity exceeded 700. Soon, a plan to construct additional floors was proposed, so CDK had to relocate. It changed several other locations in Moscow, until a final return in 1968. By then, a new building was constructed right next to the old one. It was designed by Eugene Stamo in the then fashionable Constructivism style. A massive stained glass panel by Fernand Léger was donated by the artist's widow Nadia Khodasevich to the new venue.

In the 1970s, CDK was one of the most important cultural venues in the USSR, open only to members of the Cinematographers Union or visitors with special invitations.

== XXI century ==
In 2016, CDK became public. Since then, the tickets went on sale, the venue started hosting open talks and master classes for wide audiences, as well as music concerts and shows.

=== Reconstruction ===
in August 2022, the Union of Cinematographers announced the plan to reconstruct CDK. According to the project, the reconstructed complex will include an apartment building of 29250 square meters, while the cinema hall will be of only 4500 square meters.
