= The Duel (Chekhov novella) =

Novella by Anton Chekhov

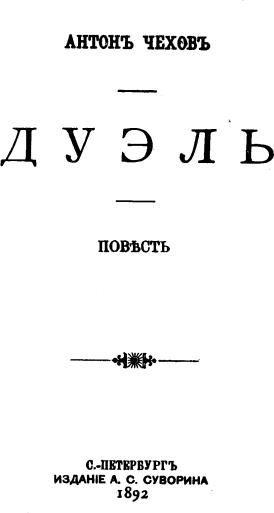
- First edition
- Author: Anton Chekhov
- Original title: Дуэль
- Language: Russian
- Genre: Novella
- Publisher: Novoye Vremya
- Publication date: 1891
- Publication place: Russia
- Media type: Print (Paperback & Hardback)

The Duel (Russian: Дуэль, romanized: Duél') is a novella by Anton Chekhov originally published in 1891; it was adapted for the screen by Iosif Kheifits in 1973 (as The Bad Good Man, starring Vladimir Vysotsky) and by Dover Kosashvili in 2010 (as The Duel).

== Publication ==
"The Duel" was first serialized in Aleksey Suvorin's newspaper Novoye Vremya from October–November 1891, after which Suvorin edited the novella and published it as a separate edition. The book enjoyed nine re-issues during the 1890s. Chekhov included "The Duel" in Volume 6 of his Collected Works, published by Adolf Marks in 1899–1901.

== Background ==
Chekhov started writing the novella in January 1891. According to Mikhail Chekhov, while working upon it Chekhov regularly met with the zoologist and writer Vladimir Wagner. The two had lengthy discussions, one of which was on the subject of the then-popular concept of "the right of the strong one", which formed the basis of the philosophy of the main character of the work, Nikolai Vassilitch von Koren, for whom Wagner apparently served as a template.

== Plot ==
Ivan Andreitch Laevsky is an educated Russian aristocrat who has run off to a Black Sea village with a married woman, Nadezhda Fyodorovna. When the novella begins, he has fallen out of love with Nadezhda Fyodorovna, who is having affairs with other men, and wants to leave her. He receives a letter informing him that her husband has died; however, he hides the letter in a book and does not tell her about it. That, he says, would be like inviting her to marry him.

Laevsky confides in Alexander Daviditch Samoylenko, a military doctor who has befriended Laevsky and looks after him. Samoylenko urges Laevsky to marry Nadezhda Fyodorovna, even if he does not love her. Laevsky says he cannot marry a woman he has no feelings for, but he cannot leave her, because she has no family and relies on him for survival. Samoylenko tells him to give her enough money to live on. Laevsky, however, says he is 2000 rubles in debt and cannot afford to do that.

As for Nadezhda Fyodorovna, she considers herself the most beautiful young woman in the city. She had a one-night stand with police commissioner Kirilin, whom she has been running away from ever since. She owes three hundred roubles to a merchant and thinks of giving herself to his young son Atchmianov, whom she likes, to pay off her debt.

Samoylenko has two lodgers living in his house, and they discuss philosophy, science, and literature around the dinner table and elsewhere. One of them is Nikolay von Koren, a zoologist; the other is the deacon Pobedov of the Russian Orthodox church. The doctor, the zoologist, and the deacon discuss the new idea of evolution. In a friendly discussion, the deacon says that man is descended from God, while Koren argues that man is descended from apes. He explains the survival of the fittest: fitter animals survive to pass their strength on to their descendants, but weaker animals die off.

Koren goes on to use Laevsky as an example of a man who is not fit to survive. When Laevsky came to town, he brought with him habits that the townsfolk view as uncouth. Koren says that Laevsky should not be permitted to reproduce; otherwise there would be children as uncouth as Laevsky all over Russia. Koren goes on to compare Laevsky to the cholera microbe, and says he would like to kill Laevsky himself, as one would kill a pest. Samoylenko and the deacon reject these ideas, Samoylenko out of compassion, and the deacon because he believes in the love taught by Christ. Samoylenko is offended by Koren insulting Laevsky and they reject his "German" ideas.

Laevsky decides to leave town for Petersburg. He says that he will go first and send for Nadezhda Fyodorovna after he is settled, but Samoylenko and Koren know that this is his way of abandoning her. Since he has no money, he asks Samoylenko to loan him 300 roubles. Samoylenko agrees, but does not have the money. He tells Laevsky he will have to borrow it in turn from a third party, then, after Laevsky leaves, asks Koren for a loan. Koren agrees, on the condition that Laevsky takes Nadezhda Fyodorovna with him to Petersburg.

Laevsky returns a day later to get the money. Koren treats him contemptuously and refers to his personal difficulties. Laevsky becomes furious and accuses Samoylenko of betraying his confidence. Samoylenko indignantly denies the accusation, but Laevsky threatens both of them in an attempt to get them to leave him alone. Koren twists this into a challenge to a duel, which he says he accepts. Laevsky agrees, their friends cannot talk them out of it, and they make arrangements for a duel with pistols.

Meanwhile, Nadezhda Fyodorovna is being pursued by Kirilin. He attempts to blackmail her into having sex with him again under the threat of being exposed as an adulterer. She finally agrees to meet him again that night and one more night afterwards. Another of her pursuers, the tailor's son Atchmianov, discovers her assignation with the police captain.

The night before the duel, Laevsky is drinking and playing cards. Atchmianov tells Laevsky to follow him to meet someone about very important business. He leads Laevsky to the room where Kirilin and Nadezhda Fyodorovna are having sex. Laevsky then goes home, more upset about her affair with the police captain than about the duel.

The morning of the duel, both Laevsky's and Koren's friends try to talk them into forgiving each other. Laevsky agrees and apologizes, but Koren insists on going through with it. Laevsky deliberately misses, firing his pistol into the air, but Koren takes aim at Laevsky's head. Meanwhile, the deacon, who has been hurrying to the scene, appears from the bushes and shouts, causing Koren to flinch and miss Laevsky.

Laevsky returns home and has a change of heart. He is now in love with Nadezhda Fyodorovna again, and they are married three weeks later. In the wake of the wedding, Laevsky is a changed man, working hard to pay off his debts. Koren prepares to leave town. He is amazed at Laevsky's transformation and says that if Laevsky had been like this originally, they could have been good friends. Before he leaves, he visits the newlyweds' home, where Laevsky and Nadezhda Fyodorovna greet him awkwardly. Laevsky and Koren shake hands, and they all say emotional goodbyes.
