= The Fourth =

1972 Soviet film by Aleksandr Stolper

- Russian poster
- Russian: Четвёртый
- Directed by: Aleksandr Stolper
- Written by: Konstantin Simonov; Aleksandr Stolper
- Starring: Vladimir Vysotsky; Margarita Terekhova; Sergey Shakurov; Alexander Kaidanovsky; Sergey Sazontev
- Cinematography: Valentin Zheleznyakov
- Music by: Yan Frenkel
- Production company: Mosfilm
- Release date: 1972
- Running time: 71 min.
- Country: Soviet Union
- Language: Russian

The Fourth (Russian: Четвёртый, romanized: Chetvyortyy) is a 1972 Soviet drama film directed by Aleksandr Stolper.

The film tells the story of an American journalist who has to make a difficult choice: publicize the plans of supporters of the war after having lost all his life's benefits or to retreat.

== Plot ==
During World War II, the crew of an American bomber is captured and placed in a German prisoner-of-war camp. Three members of the crew decide to sacrifice their lives to allow the other prisoners a chance to escape. The protagonist, the fourth crew member, wishes to join them in their mission. However, his commander and comrades refuse, explaining that only three are needed for the plan; a fourth person would arouse suspicion among the Germans and make the escape impossible. As he bids farewell to his friends departing on this fatal mission, he says: "-Honestly, Dick (the name of the commander of the "Flying Fortress"), I'll feel ashamed to live." He hears the response - "Then live in a way you won’t feel ashamed."

The three airmen perish, but many prisoners, including the protagonist, succeed in escaping from the camp.

Fifteen years later, the former prisoner has become a well-known and successful American journalist. Before a planned trip to Europe to cover a NATO session, he learns of a clandestine plan by American air intelligence, effectively signaling an imminent military conflict between the USSR and the United States. The protagonist faces a moral dilemma: to make a public statement exposing the provocative plans he's learned of, which would cost him his career and personal comforts, or to remain silent.

On the eve of his departure from the United States, he visits his ex-wife, spending the night with her and reflecting on his life. He recalls the ideals he once fought for during World War II and the Spanish Civil War, as well as his betrayal of friends in the postwar American Communist Party. In the end, he makes a difficult choice about his future.

== Cast ==
- Vladimir Vysotsky
- Margarita Terekhova
- Sergey Shakurov
- Alexander Kaidanovsky
- Sergey Sazontev
- Yury Solomin
- Tatyana Vasileva
- Maris Liepa
- Armen Dzhigarkhanyan
- Juozas Budraitis
- Mihai Volontir
- Lev Durov
- Leonid Kulagin
