= Lukomorye no longer exists =

1967 song by Vladimir Vysotsky

Song by Vladimir Vysotsky

from the album Save our Souls
- Language: Russian
- Released: 1987
- Genre: Bard
- Label: Melodiya
- Songwriter: Vladimir Vysotsky

"Lukomorye no longer exists" (Russian: Лукоморья больше нет) is a song with the subtitle "anti-fairy tale" by Vladimir Vysotsky. It was written between June and September 1967. Alternative titles include: "Lukomorye", "Song-Fairy Tale about Lukomorye", "Song-Anti-Fairy Tale". The song is a travesty of the prologue to the poem Ruslan and Ludmila by Alexander Pushkin. In the song, Vysotsky compares the reality surrounding him with the fairy-tale world of Lukomorye. The text was published during the poet's lifetime, in 1977 in Paris, in the first collected edition of poems and songs Songs of Russian Bards. The author performed the song at concerts until 1976.

The song belongs to the so-called early period of Vysotsky's work. Pushkin, with his encyclopedic and universal creative world, was always interesting to Vysotsky, and this was expressed in 1966–1967 in a series of travesty songs and song-fairy tales, such as "Song about the Prophetess Cassandra", "Song about the Prophetic Oleg" (a travesty of Pushkin's ballad Song of the Prophetic Oleg about the death of Oleg the Wise), "Song-Fairy Tale about Evil Spirits", "From Boring Sabbaths...", "Fairy Tale about Unfortunate Forest Dwellers" («Песня о вещей Кассандре», «Песня о вещем Олеге», «Песня-сказка о нечисти», «От скучных шабашей…», «Сказка о несчастных лесных жителях»), and others. The creation of the anti-fairy tale "Lukomorye no longer exists" is connected with the development of neomythological art — a trend that emerged in the Soviet artistic environment in the 1960s. The Soviet neomythologism of that time demonstrated a pronounced focus on the social aspects of the era, and Vysotsky, drawing on folklore and high poetry, shed new light on the "low" reality surrounding him.

The song contains not only "distant cultural layers" but also clear echoes of sources closer to Vysotsky's era, which influenced or were reflected in his work in one way or another. The traditions of folk humorous and folklore culture of various eras, Vysotsky's reading experiences, and certain events from the life of the bard and his circle had a direct influence on "Lukomorye". All of this, processed through the poet's perspective, is transformed into an organic song-poetic form that expresses the crisis of the world contemporary to him.

In the USSR, the song was first released in 1987 on the record Save Our Souls by the Melodiya company (the second in the series At Vladimir Vysotsky's Concerts), and in printed form, it was published in 1988 in a collection of the poet's selected poems, released by the Sovetsky Pisatel publishing house. The anti-fairy tale "Lukomorye no longer exists" has retained the relevance of the issues it raises for decades after its creation and has had a certain influence on some socio-cultural processes.

== Song history ==
Lukomorye no longer exists

Lukomorye no longer exists,
The oaks have vanished tracelessly,—
An oak would do for parquet—
but no:
Huge louts
Were coming out
From the huts,
They chopped all the oaks
for coffins.

Calm down, calm down, my sorrow,
In my chest!
This is only the prelude,
The fairy-tale comes ahead.

The history of the song's creation is connected, according to researchers, to various circumstances of Vysotsky's life and work. Even in his youth, Vysotsky wrote humorous pieces for student kapustnik performances, toasts for friends, and dedications in the name of literary classics, including the works of Pushkin: "If I ate and drank here, // I could say without hesitation: // I got what I wanted, — // I recall a wondrous moment". Also known is an early humorous poem by Vysotsky about school life: "And there on the stair landings // Traces of unseen people. // The principal there on chicken legs // Without eyes, without brains, without ears". According to literary scholar Anatoly Kulagin, Vysotsky felt an "inner, creative need" to choose Pushkin as a constant "poetic interlocutor", and with the creation in 1967 of a series of humorous songs, the bard's true "dialogue" with the classic began.

Several researchers of Vysotsky's work, analyzing the song, conclude that its origins could stem not only from the poem Ruslan and Lyudmila, but also from its numerous folkloric adaptations popular in the 1930s–1950s, as well as other sources and events from the bard's life and circle: The Tale of Tsar Saltan by A. S. Pushkin, Vysotsky's participation in the play Antiworlds (he began acting in this production in 1964, having joined the Taganka Theatre), and the Soviet theatrical community's acquaintance with the concepts of "anti-drama" and "anti-novel" (used in the mid-20th century in relation to the works of A. Robbe-Grillet, N. Sarraute, S. Beckett, E. Ionesco). The song also reflects knowledge that the poet gained during his student years. For example, information about the folk belief that wood spirits like leshy feed on bark ("Did I not bring berries?! — // The Leshiy wailed again, — // And how many kilos of bark // did I bring!") was acquired by Vysotsky at the MHAT School-Studio during lectures by art history professor B. N. Simolin. During those same student years, the poet met the widow of writer Mikhail Bulgakov, Elena Sergeyevna, and long before its first publication, read the novel the Master and Margarita. Acquaintance with this work was also reflected in the song Lukomorye no longer exists.

According to the memoirs of the poet's wife, Lyudmila Abramova, in the early 1960s, Vladimir Vysotsky became fascinated with reading science fiction literature, particularly favoring the works of the Strugatsky Brothers, and in 1966, he personally met Arkady Strugatsky. According to Abramova, "the mutual impression was, of course, tremendous. The commonality of creative interests was reflected in Vysotsky's writing of the song In the Distant Constellation of Tau Ceti, created against the backdrop of the Strugatsky Brothers' work on Snail on the Slope. The authors took great pride in the fact that their ideas, related to the development of a similar theme, emerged simultaneously. A year after meeting the Strugatskys, Vysotsky wrote a whole series of song-fairy tales: Song-Fairy Tale about Evil Spirits, Fairy Tale about Unfortunate Fairy-Tale Characters, From Boring Sabbaths..., and in June–September 1967, the anti-fairy tale Lukomorye no longer exists. The idea of placing fairy-tale characters in contemporary reality was implemented by the Strugatskys in their 1965 novella Monday Begins on Saturday, where some events take place on Lukomorye Street. However, Vysotsky, drawing on the Strugatskys, demonstrated in the very title of his work that he was developing the theme in a completely opposite direction.

A presumably early version of "Lukomorye" has been preserved, also playing on the prologue to Ruslan and Lyudmila: "I used to read Pushkin all night until dawn — // about the green oak and the golden chain there. // And now I find myself at Lukomorye, // Sent on a mission to Pushkin's places". Further, the narrator recalls how he worked on canals and power plants (hydroelectric power stations and TPPs) and saw there a green oak covered with carved initials and cans lying on "unseen paths". By the narrator's admission, he also encountered March cats there, but they did not respond to his request to "sing". The poem, according to Kulagin's assessment, was close in genre to a poetic feuilleton, but it was also built on contrasts—juxtaposing what the narrator read in Pushkin with what he saw in the surrounding reality.

In the original version, the song's refrain: "Calm down, calm down, my sorrow in my chest, // This is only the prelude, the tale lies ahead" was repeated after each verse, and later, less frequently, in various variations. The first known lifetime recording of the song dates to November 1967, the last to 1974. From 1976 onward, Vysotsky stopped performing Lukomorye at his concerts. Fyodor Razzakov linked this circumstance to Vysotsky's visit to the Tsarskoye Selo Lyceum (this took place in October 1977). According to the researcher, acquaintance with the places where the poet's school years were spent also indicates a change in the bard's attitude toward Pushkin's work — it became more reverent than in his youth.

== First editions, criticism, translations into other languages ==
In 1971, the American branch of the recording company Collector Records released an English-language record titled Songs of the Soviet Underground translated by Mikhail Allen and performed by Nugzar Sharia, a Georgian actor who had emigrated from the USSR. A year after its release, the Paris-based publication Russian Mind published an extensive review by Pyotr Kursky, who thoroughly analyzed the quality of the translation and performance of the song Lukomorye ni longer exists, included in this collection. The critic viewed Lukomorye as "sharp social satire on contemporary Soviet society" and lamented that "deciphering Aesopian language of Vysotsky and explaining the meaning of each image would be highly desirable, especially for those putrid in Western countries". In 1974, a record was released in the USA with an unknown circulation, referred to as the Andrejevsky Album after the Soviet emigrant who illicitly produced it from a mediocre recording of Vysotsky. The first song in the collection was Lukomorye no longer exists. During the poet's lifetime, the song was published in Russian in 1977 in Paris in the collection Songs of Russian Bards, and at the end of 1978, its text was printed in an author's selection included in the first issue of the almanac Metropol.

In the USSR, widespread, uncensored publication of Vysotsky's poetic and prose texts began only after he was posthumously awarded, in 1987, the State Prize of the USSR "for creating the image of Zheglov in the television feature film The Meeting Place Cannot Be Changed and for the author's performance of songs". Lukomorye no longer exists was released in 1987 on the record by the Melodiya company Save Our Souls (the second in the series "At Vladimir Vysotsky's Concerts"). The series, consisting of 21 records, was prepared by Vsevolod Abdulov and Igor Shevtsov with the participation of the commission on Vysotsky's creative legacy. For the first time, in chronological order, the bard's concert activities were showcased, covering a fifteen-year period and over 250 songs. The record covers were designed by artists of the Taganka Theatre—David Borovsky and Semyon Beiderman. The front and back covers, in addition to an annotation (for this record, it was written by Bulat Okudzhava), featured rare, previously unpublished photographs of Vysotsky at concerts. The Save Our Souls record used concert recordings from 1967 (the year the song was created) recorded by Mikhail Kryzhanovsky. In printed form, Lukomorye was included in 1988 in a collection of the poet's selected poems, published by the Sovetsky Pisatel publishing house.

Fyodor Razzakov notes that in the same year, 1987, the RSFSR State Prize named after M. Gorky in literature was awarded to the poet Stanislav Kunyaev for his book — a collection of critical and journalistic articles titled Fire Flickering in a Vessel. One of the critical works in the book was dedicated to Vladimir Vysotsky's work. In particular, the article contained the following postulates:

Vysotsky sacrificed much for stage success. According to Voznesensky, "his Russia should weep" with not a single bright song about it, about its great history, about the Russian character, a song written with love or at least with a Blok-like feeling... The famous bard, for the sake of stage success, "for a catchy phrase," did not spare our national sanctities... His songs did not fight against decay but, on the contrary, aesthetically framed it... A modern child, if they first hear Vysotsky's parody of Lukomorye, is unlikely to experience that soul-forming feeling when reading the real Lukomorye, because its characters have already been hopelessly ridiculed. The fairy tale has been killed...

The twenty pages of text about Vysotsky in Kunyaev's book were a summation of all his journalism about the poet, the first of which was the article From the Great to the Ridiculous, published in 1982 in the Literary Gazette and causing a "ninth wave of indignant responses" both among readers across the country and among specialists. However, there were also critical opinions that aligned with Kunyaev's views on Vysotsky's work. Among Vladimir Vysotsky's fans, a succinct summarizing expression emerged — "to be Kunyaeved".

== Versions of the social subtext ==
"The song is an anti-fairy tale, written against all the fairy tales I've written so far. It's called Lukomorye no longer exists" (September 1967)

...It is aimed at protecting monuments of antiquity. Both literary and architectural"

— Vysotsky V. S. From recordings of concert performances

The first attempt to analyze the subtext contained in the song "Lukomorye no longer exists" occurred in 1972, when reviewer Pyotr Kursky published a detailed article in the Paris newspaper Russian Mind dedicated to Vysotsky's anti-fairy tale. The author evaluated the work as sharp social satire and examined the characters and their actions in the song from the perspective of historical events in the USSR. According to Kursky, the "thirty-three bogatyrs" symbolize in Vysotsky's work "the triumph of party boorishness and philistinism, and the oblivion of the 'high' revolutionary ideals for which 'blood was shed,'" while the "learned cat", likely a member of the Union of Soviet Writers, and his "memoirs about the Tatars" are probably a reference to the deportation of the Crimean Tatars carried out by Stalin in 1944.

"Soviet power destroyed Pushkin's fairy-tale world: "Lukomorye no longer exists" —and the entire song is devoted to describing this destruction"— this is how literary scholar Yakov Korman presents the song in his book "Vladimir Vysotsky: A Key to the Subtext". In the second line of the verse "It's wonderful to live in houses // On chicken legs, // But along came, to everyone's fear, // A reckless fool. // He was a fine fellow: // He got the witch grandmother drunk, // Performed a martial feat— // Burned the house down", the researcher sees the beginning of Soviet history—the emergence of Soviet power. The reckless fool, in his view, is the founder of the Soviet state, and the image of the destroyed house personifies Russia. In Korman's assessment, the ironic characterization of the reckless fool —"he was a fine fellow"— carries a negative connotation.

The huge louts, thirty-three bogatyrs, their uncle, the bearded Chernomor (in the draft of the work, "But the vile Chernomor turned out to be a scoundrel and a thief"), the sorcerer — "a liar, a chatterbox, and a joker," the cat — "a learned son of a bitch," the wood spirit with his wife—all these characters, according to Korman, also represent various figures of Soviet power with negative characteristics. Chernomor's beard symbolizes the antiquity and old age of Soviet statehood and its representatives.

"Thirty-three bogatyrs // Decided it was for naught // <...> // Having stripped the green oak, // Their uncle made a log cabin, // With those around him, he became // Dull and rude"—these lines are interpreted by the researcher as the plundering of the country by Soviet officials, who built luxurious palaces for themselves and refused to communicate humanely with those around them. In the verses "There really walks a Cat, // To the right—he sings, // To the left—he tells // an anecdote. // But the learned son of a bitch: // He sold the golden chain to Torgsin // And with the proceeds—alone // to the store," Korman sees the squandering of all the country's treasures and their "drinking away". The destruction of the fairy-tale world evokes bitter feelings in Vysotsky, described in the song's refrain—"Calm down, calm down, my sorrow, // In my chest!" (variant: "Don't wound my soul!")

On the other hand, according to researcher B. S. Dykhanova, the world depicted by Vysotsky symbolizes the burdensome metamorphoses of the reality surrounding the poet. Coffins are made from oaks, a folkloric symbol of eternal life; the bogatyrs, led by their uncle, forgot their purpose of defending the homeland for the sake of a mercenary goal; the mermaid who gave birth (a symbol of chastity) underwent a physiological transformation altogether. All these images are reflections of irreversible changes in reality that followed a tragic shift in the people's self-consciousness, which abandoned the old fairy tale. Its possible disappearance was prophesied by a character in the novel-chronicle the Cathedral Folk by Leskov: "Live, my dear sirs, Russian people, in harmony with your old fairy tale. The old fairy tale is a wonderful thing! Woe to those who will not have it in their old age..."

== Artistic features ==
=== Parodic adaptations ===
The prologue to Alexander Sergeyevich Pushkin's poem Ruslan and Lyudmila ("In Lukomorye a green oak tree...") inspired the creation of numerous parodies and adaptations. According to researchers, literary scholars have identified and analyzed over fifty textual variants based on the fairy-tale poem. These are thematically divided into several groups, with a significant portion relating to the political realities of various eras. The earliest known adaptation of the prologue dates back to 1899 — a collective work by St. Petersburg students describing the atmosphere at their educational institution ("In a dungeon there science languishes, / The temple of science serves as a prison"). Among the adaptations that have attracted specialists' attention, many are anonymous texts. At the same time, there are literary variants with specific authors, including the poet Vladimir Mayakovsky, the translator Ivan Tkhorevsky, and others.

The song "Lukomorye no longer exists", included in this series, is close to the "parodic form" (a term by prose writer and literary scholar Yuri Tynyanov) — a burlesque and comic poetry known in the Russian tradition as a "reworking". According to literary critic Vladimir Novikov, both during Vysotsky's lifetime and after his death, some critics claimed that the song contained "a certain parodic aggression toward Pushkin". Disagreeing with such assessments, Novikov asserts that "true values are not afraid of being tested by laughter". If in childhood Pushkin's Lukomorye is perceived by the reader as a kind of ideal model of the universe, then, as an adult, one can afford to view it with irony, the literary scholar believes. It is then that it becomes apparent that in the "anti-world" invented by Vysotsky, the intellectual hero behaves differently than in the prologue to Ruslan and Lyudmila: "There really walks a cat, to the right—he sings, / To the left—he tells an anecdote". A similar transformation occurs with other characters of Vysotsky's Lukomorye.

The essence of this kind of parodies (or of this "re-dressing," "turning things inside out") is not to defame the high models of cultures, but to apply high poetry to "low" reality and illuminate it in a new way. <...> So, there is absolutely nothing offensive to Pushkin here. I think Alexander Sergeyevich would not have been offended by such an adaptation. After all, he himself reworked many others!

=== 1960s neomythologism ===
The emergence of Vysotsky's song-fairy tales, including "Lukomorye", is largely connected with the intensive development of neomythological art — a trend that saw a surge of interest in the Soviet artistic environment in the 1960s, aiming to recreate, reinterpret, or reimagine established myths of bygone times. One of the features of neomythologism during the period of the Khrushchev Thaw and subsequent years is a pronounced focus on the social aspects of the era, when the conditional past is replaced by a quite specific, recognizable present. According to philologist Svetlana Tolokonnikova, Vysotsky's plots and characters organically fit into the concept of neomythologism: "Vysotsky's mythological and fairy-tale characters live not in a mythical or vaguely fairy-tale time, but in the so-called our time".

Interest in folkloric motifs appeared in Vysotsky's songs even before "Lukomorye" (for example, he had previously written "The Tale of the Wild Boar" and other works) and became one of the hallmarks of his early work. In the so-called fairy-tale cycle of the poet, folkloric heroes not only move into the plots of modern times but also acquire new, previously uncharacteristic traits. According to literary scholar Igor Sukhikh, an analysis of the poet's thematic series shows that they almost always include two songs at opposite poles of emotional impact — for example, if one contains elements of pathos, the other mutes the elevated tone with irony. In this sense, a kind of counterpart to Lukomorye is the song How Many Wonders Are Hidden Behind the Mists, written by Vysotsky for the feature film Master of the Taiga but ultimately not included in the movie. Literary scholar Vladimir Novikov, developing this theme, included Lukomorye in the conditionally thematic direction of Vysotsky's work Pro et contra (For and Against), in which every life event is examined by the poet from different perspectives: "Pushkin's ideally fairy-tale Lukomorye paradoxically turns into a Soviet total mess".

=== Vysotsky's Fairy-Tale Poetry and his lexical peculiarity ===
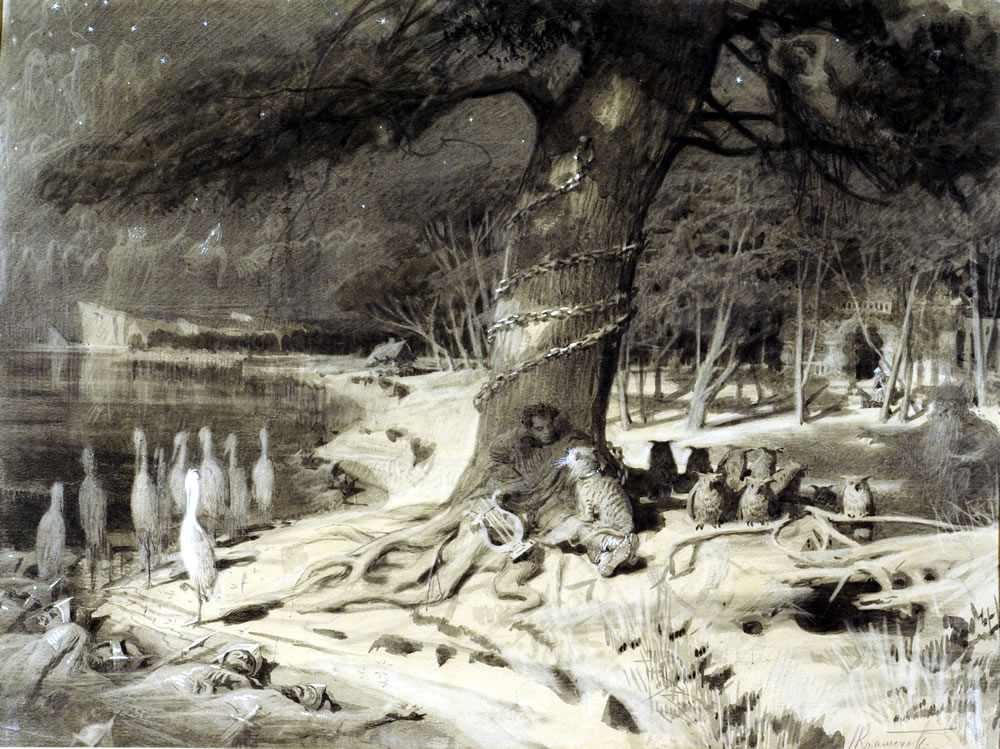
I. N. Kramskoi, 1879. Ruslan and Lyudmila. Illustration to the Prologue — the prototype of the song

The ideological constraints of the second half of the 1960s and 1970s sometimes forced representatives of the Soviet creative intelligentsia to resort to conventions, where narratives about real problems were camouflaged as phantasmagoria. Irony served as a kind of "protective function" for some writers. For Vysotsky, who entered the author's song genre during a period of intense censorship pressure, ironic language acted as a kind of "translator", through which the bard sought to convey thoughts about pressing issues to his audience.

Among Vysotsky's fairy tales, researchers distinguish fantastic fables (e.g., "Song About the Scapegoat"), stylizations (the Alice in Wonderland cycle), works combining various styles ("Constellation of Tau Ceti"), and songs with philosophical subtext (I'm in a binge from loneliness, No, guys, it's all wrong). Lukomorye belongs to the series of everyday fairy tales by the poet; it lacks overt pronouncements about the spiritual emptiness of society, but behind the humor and author's irony lie tragic intonations: "The fantastic, as with Bulgakov, and earlier Gogol, turns out to be a frank reflection of the real situation".

One of the artistic techniques used by Vysotsky in "Lukomorye" is the negation principle — the word "no" appears twice in the first stanza. This is followed by multiple repetitions of either the prefix or the particle "not", reinforcing the idea of the destruction of the ideally sacred world created by Pushkin: "out of work", "not for long", "do not wish", "no secret". The drama gradually intensifies, culminating in a bitter conclusion: "Everything the poet wrote about is nonsense". The refrain ("Calm down, calm down, my sorrow") also employs the technique of negation ("don't wound my soul"). Thus, the work consistently creates an atmosphere of escalation, leading to the key authorial message that Pushkin's Lukomorye has been effectively destroyed.

To demonstrate how the harmonious world of the former Lukomorye differs from modern realities, Vysotsky employs a method that specialists call "vulgarization." Thus, if noble heroes, "splendid knights", act in Pushkin's fairy tale, in the song Lukomorye no longer exists they are replaced by "huge louts." The learned cat behaves differently in the new era than his ancient predecessor—according to the poet, he is a "son of a bitch" who sold his golden chain to Torgsin. Demonstrating the difference between the two worlds, Vysotsky deliberately uses colloquial words: "their," "scram," "booze breath," "tell an anecdote," "old geezer," and others. Researchers particularly highlight the image of the oak, which in Pushkin's work serves as a kind of "world axis." In Vysotsky's version, this axis is eliminated—the oaks have been chopped down and used to make coffins. Moreover, in the rhyme "louts—coffins", a clear cause-and-effect relationship is evident.

=== Anti-World and Anti-Fairy Tale ===
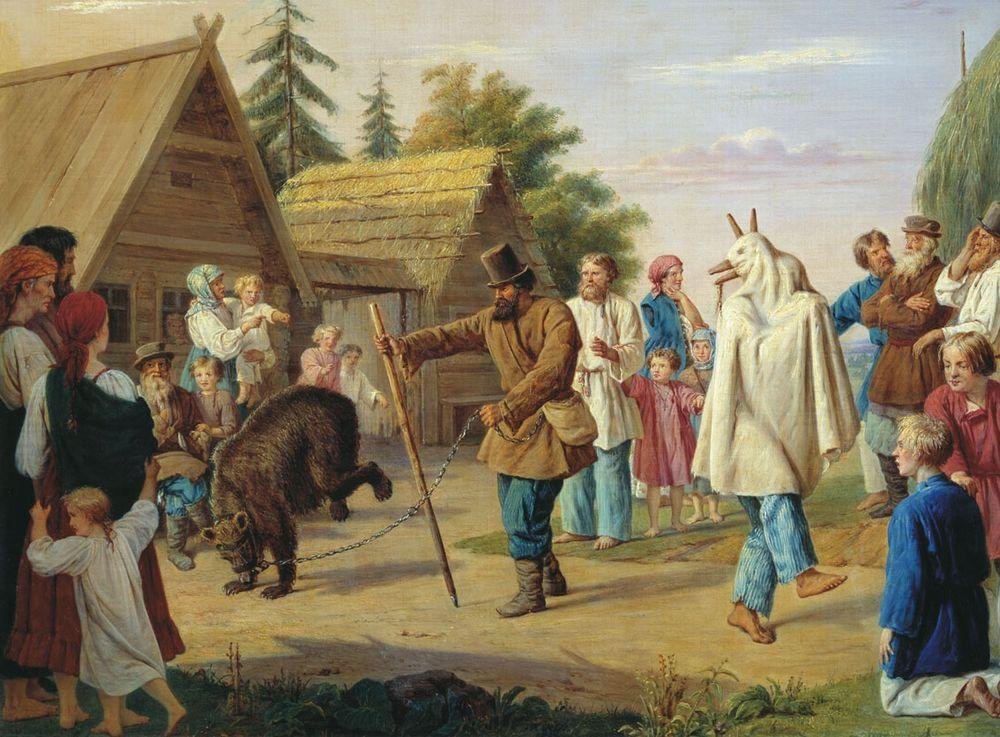
F. N. Riss. Skomorokhs in a Village, 1857

The term "anti-fairy tale" for Lukomorye was coined by Vysotsky himself during a concert in 1967, where he introduced the work with the caveat that his new song was written "against all the fairy tales" he had composed up to that point. The emergence of the prefix "anti-" has various explanations among researchers. Firstly, it relates to the title of the play Antiworlds. The title of the production based on the poems of Andrei Voznesensky was mentioned by the bard in 1964 in the song March of the Physics Students: "The paths to the anti-world are not yet trodden". Secondly, in the literature and theater of the mid-20th century, the concepts of "antinovel" and "antidrama" gained wide currency, associated with the works of several representatives of modernist prose and drama, and the author of Lukomorye may have made a deliberate reference to these terms.

Speaking about the origins of the anti-world created by Vysotsky, Anatoly Kulagin cites the theses of academic Dmitry Likhachev, who wrote that in Ancient Russian humorous culture there existed its own "anti-world", which was also an object of parody—for example, expressions like "The sheep, a skilled craftswoman, orders all shepherds to be shorn" or "The ox did not want to be an ox and became a butcher." Such "inversions" are rooted in the traditions of skomorokh performance, where "anti-behavior" by participants in theatrical rituals was considered the norm. Vysotsky, whom researchers call a "poet with a folkloric consciousness" and a "20th-century skomorokh," uses the same techniques in Lukomorye — he depicts the direct process of transitioning from a harmoniously ordered world to its opposite, demonstrating the replacement of a correct reality with a distorted one, where everything is turned upside down: "chopped down," "decided," "stole". The song also incorporates characters reminiscent of puppets of folk theater; the participants in this performance — both spectators and actors behind the screen— also existed within the framework of a kind of anti-world: some lived in it, others parodied it.

This song is not about individual unsightly aspects of Soviet reality in the 60s (although it is also about them); it is about the crisis of the world, about its general discrepancy with the high ideal set by Pushkin's classical verses, about the anti-world in which the poet and his contemporaries exist.

=== Comparison with Pushkin's text and images' transformation ===
Comparing Pushkin's Ruslan and Lyudmila with Vysotsky's song, researchers note that in the anti-fairy tale, Lukomorye does not merely change — it is completely deformed. In the source text, its image is created with words such as "splendid knights", "unseen beasts", "sea uncle". In Vysotsky's work, an entirely different backdrop emerges: "coffins", "prison", "paralysis", "nonsense", "geezer", "trash", "stole", "scram", and other words. A kind of substitution of-romantic symbols and characters occurs throughout: thus, if in Pushkin's work the sorcerer Chernomor acts, in Vysotsky's version, his place is taken by "Lukomorye's first thief". The notion of valor is also transformed, and thus, for the heroes of the anti-fairy tale, the role model becomes the "fine fellow" reckless fool, who "got the witch grandmother drunk, performed a martial feat, burned the house down".

Vysotsky makes lexical and word-formation substitutions — and the familiar hut on hen's legs turns into a house "on chicken legs", and noble bogatyrs become "louts" who refuse to acknowledge the mermaid's son. Specialists call the song Lukomorye no longer exists a collage, with elements drawn not only from "Ruslan and Lyudmila" but also from both old and new folklore. The substitutions made by the poet invert the familiar plot—resulting in a modern, devoid of romantic flair, original story composed of mini-plots.

The contrast with Pushkin's text is also evident at the verse level: if Pushkin uses his favorite meter — 4-foot iamb, Vysotsky turns to free trochee. It should be noted that, according to B. I. Yarkho, this meter, rare for Russian classical poetry, is found in Pushkin's work. <...> It can be said that Vysotsky actively develops the forms that were on the periphery of the great classic's verse system.

== Literary and folklore parallels ==
=== Echoes of the Strugatsky Brothers' science fiction ===
In the song Lukomorye, as researchers note, there are almost direct references to the Strugatsky brothers' work Monday Begins on Saturday —not only in the name of the street, Lukomorye, where the Scientific Research Institute of Sorcery and Wizardry is located, but also in other significant coincidences: the presence among the characters of a poetry-reciting cat, a large Pushkinian oak, and a mermaid sitting in the tree. However, the Strugatskys’ protagonist —a young Leningrad programmer named Privalov, who finds himself in this environment by chance and observes the wonders occurring there— does not live in a fairy-tale world: he is a materialist scientist capable of providing a scientific explanation for any unusual event. While trying to understand the essence of the fantastic phenomena woven into reality, Privalov gradually sheds his initial astonishment: "I had read something about such cases somewhere and now recalled that the behavior of people who found themselves in similar circumstances always seemed to me extraordinarily, irritatingly absurd".

A similar blending of the fictional and real worlds is present in the song Lukomorye. At the same time, while preserving some of the ambiance of the novella about an institute studying magic, Vysotsky developed the theme, showing that the magical Lukomorye invented by Pushkin (and later shaped by the Strugatskys) has disappeared—it was destroyed by the "age of total cynicism". Thus, if in Monday Begins on Saturday the museum caretaker Naina Gorynych represents a modern version of Baba Yaga with her cunning and natural slyness, in Vysotsky’s fairy tales, the "unclean spirits" behave almost defiantly: "these are brazen modern women, as they say, ‘from the common folk". According to Svetlana Tolokonnikova, the Strugatskys and Vysotsky exhibit "completely different neomythologism":

The combination of two worlds —real modern one and fairy-tale— in the Strugatskys’ work is idealized. <…> And Lukomorye exists, though it resembles a museum more than anything else. <…> Vysotsky, however, by placing the Strugatskys’ mythological images in a different context, reinterprets them: the modern "iron age" (and, it seems, not only in its "Soviet" manifestation) caused the death of the fairy tale, vulgarized and destroyed it. Instead of an ironic utopia, Vysotsky creates neomythological texts of a parodic nature, sometimes with elements of dystopia.

=== Motifs, quotes, and reminiscences ===
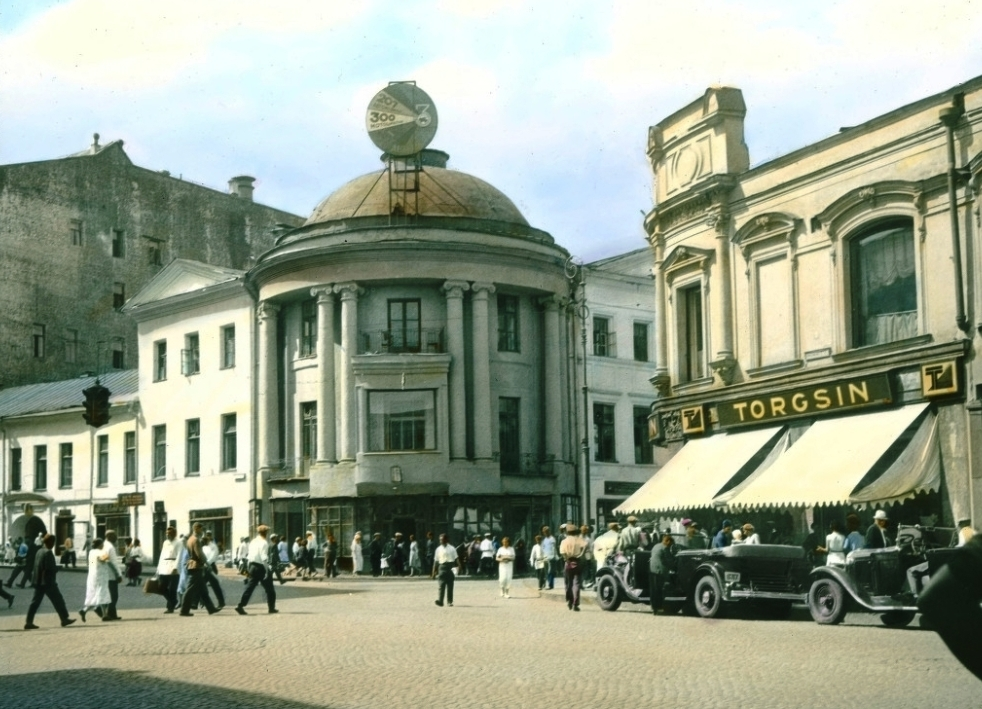
Torgsin building in Moscow, 1931

Researchers analyzing the song have concluded that, in addition to echoes of the Strugatskys’ novella, it contains reminiscences, overt or hidden references to other literary or folklore works. For example, the repeatedly used phrase "This is just the prelude" is a proverb that, in a slightly altered form, was previously used by Pyotr Ershov in The Little Humpbacked Horse ("This is the prelude: wait") and by Alexander Tvardovsky in the poem Vasily Tyorkin ("This is the prelude for now, // The tale lies ahead"). The image of a modern-day Mermaid who "didn’t guard her honor for long" was likely created under the influence of a song written in the 1960s by Mikhail Ancharov, Foolish Lyrical, which includes, in particular, the lines: "Behind the fence—what a thing!— // The girl spread her legs". The mention of the Mermaid giving birth to a "son of the regiment" is a humorous play on the title of Valentin Kataev's novella Son of the Regiment.

Literary scholars have paid particular attention to the cat who took his golden chain to a Torgsin—a store, part of a network established in the 1930s for exchanging currency for scarce goods and considered a predecessor of the Beryozka stores. According to some researchers, the image of the cat was inspired by an episode especially from Master and Margarita's Chapter 28, which describes the visit of Behemoth and Koroviev to a Torgsin at Smolensky Market. The two cats are united by their love for anecdotes and a penchant for memoirs—as evidence, literary scholar Anatoly Kulagin cites a scene from Bulgakov’s novel where Behemoth recalls his wanderings in the desert.

At the same time, the cat from the song’s Lukomorye, called a "son of a bitch" by the poet, is similar in behavior to an Irish Setter — a character from popular pre-war couplets, likely authored by poet Yakov Yadov. The hero of his couplets, having received a medal at a dog show, behaved much like Vysotsky’s cat: "He didn’t give it to me, the son of a bitch, // He took it to Torgsin himself" . Additionally, the image of the cat may have emerged in Vysotsky’s mind after encountering a parodic variation from the 1930s (later published by folklorist Vladimir Bakhtin), which included the lines: "At Lukomorye, the oak was cut down, // The golden chain was taken to Torgsin". Finally, there is a theory that the image of this character bears some resemblance to E.T.A. Hoffmann’s Cat Murr—both express their worldly views through memoirs.

Thus, the creative reinterpretation of Pushkin's images in the song occurs in the traditions of folk comedic culture from various eras; along the way, echoes of recent reading impressions may be drawn into Vysotsky’s poetic world (a high "literary" artist). All this cultural "baggage", passing through the poet’s creative laboratory, ultimately produces an organic poetic alloy, reflecting a sense of crisis in the modern world.

== Cultural impact ==
The song, written in 1967, has not lost its relevance over the decades. Moreover, Vysotsky's anti-fairy tale resonated with certain social processes that took place in Russia in later times. The topicality of the theme set by the bard intensified during the so-called turbulent nineties, when characters reminiscent of those in the song came to the forefront. For example, researchers compared the former "sea uncle" to the new Russians, who acquired "their own plot near Moscow"; the learned cat turned into an alcoholic earning a living by writing memoirs about bygone times; the mermaid transformed into a woman of very loose morals; the wood spirit (one of the most "human-like" mythological characters, possessing human vices) began causing domestic scandals with his wife over financial problems: "You begrudge me a ruble, oh, you louse!" Almost every phrase from "Lukomorye" entered everyday lexical usage and became a modern phraseologism.

The song Lukomorye no longer exists is optionally included in educational programs in Russia and the USA. In Russian schools, since 2005, fifth-grade students study Vysotsky's work in the context of familiarizing themselves with Pushkin's poem Ruslan and Lyudmila. At the University of Texas at Austin, since 2009, the anti-fairy tale has been part of the textbook Using the Music of Vladimir Vysotsky in Teaching Russian.

Lukomorye, like many other songs by Vysotsky, had a certain influence on the development of Russian rock—it is no coincidence that several rock musicians consider the bard their "teacher". For instance, in the song-fairy tale "Swineherd" by the leader of the band Konstantin Arbenin's Zimovye Zverey, there is not only a reference to the eponymous fairy tale by Andersen but also a new perspective on the familiar plot, with characters acquiring different qualities. Similarly, the roles and behavioral functions of characters change in the song I Will Tell You by the band Rada & Ternovnik. The techniques used by these bands, in one way or another, trace back to Vysotsky's anti-fairy tale. Researchers include the band Korol i Shut among the bard's followers, whose horror-fairy tales not only develop the motifs laid down by the poet but sometimes even take them to a kind of ironic absurdity. A direct connection to Lukomorye is also found in Yanka Dyagileva's song Higher Legs Off the Ground with its tragic finale: "Only the fairy tale is fucking bad // And its ending is wrong // Zmey Gorynych killed and ate everyone".

== Bibliography ==
- Bakin, V. (2011). Владимир Высоцкий. Жизнь после смерти [Vladimir Vysotsky. Life after death.]. Лучшие биографии (in Russian). М.: Алгоритм. ISBN 978-5-457-51403-4.
- Volkova, N. V. (2014). "Лукоморья больше нет". Смеховой "антимир" В. С. Высоцкого в контексте экологии культуры ["Lukomorye no longer exists". V. S. Vysotsky's Laughing "Anti-World" in the Context of Cultural Ecology] (in Russian). Новосибирск: Культура. Духовность. Общество. pp. 40–44.
- Vysotsky, V. (1993). Сочинения. В 2 томах [Works. In 2 volumes.] (in Russian). Vol. 1. М.: Художественная литература. p. 639. ISBN 5-280-02943-2.
- Vysotsky, V. (2012). Лукоморья больше нет...: [Стихотворения] [Lukomorye no longer exists...: [Poetry]] (in Russian). СПб.: Амфора. pp. 24–26. ISBN 978-5-367-02113-4.
- Vysotsky, V. (2010). Песни. Стихотворения. Проза [Songs. Poems. Prose]. Библиотека всемирной литературы (in Russian). М.: Эксмо. pp. 691–814. ISBN 978-5-699-44686-5.
- Krylov A. E., Kulagin A. V. (2010). Высоцкий как энциклопедия советской жизни: Комментарий к песням поэта [Vysotsky as an encyclopedia of Soviet life: Commentary on the poet's songs] (in Russian). М.: Булат. p. 384. ISBN 978-5-91-457-008-5.
- Kulagin, A. V. (2002). "Лукоморья больше нет". В жанре антисказки [Vysotsky and others: Collected articles] (in Russian). М.: Благотворительный фонд Владимира Высоцкого. pp. 89–99. ISBN 5-93038-008-2.
- Kulagin, A. V. (2016). Беседы о Высоцком [Conversations about Vysotsky] (in Russian). Издательские решения. p. 164. ISBN 978-5-4474-8196-4.
- Kulagin, A. (2013). Поэзия Высоцкого: Творческая эволюция [Vysotsky's Poetry: Artistic Evolution] (in Russian). Воронеж: Эхо. p. 230.
- Novikov, V. (2013). Высоцкий [Vysotsky]. Жизнь замечательных людей (in Russian). М.: Молодая гвардия. p. 492. ISBN 978-5-235-03554-6.
- Razzakov, F. (2009). В. Высоцкий: козырь в тайной войне. Другая версия биографии великого барда [V. Vysotsky: a trump card in the secret war. Another version of the biography of the great bard]. Книги Раззакова о великих артистах (in Russian). М.: Эксмо. p. 960. ISBN 978-5-699-36352-0.
- Tolokonnikova, S. Yu. (2001). "Бард, неомифологическая ирония и научная фантастика". Мир Высоцкого: исследования и материалы [Vysotsky's World: Research and Materials] (in Russian). М.: ГКЦМ В. С. Высоцкого. pp. 264–273. ISBN 5-93038-007-4.
- Chumak-Zhun I. I., Popkova D. A. (2012). Трансформация прецедентных феноменов в "антисказках" Высоцкого как один из способов художественного отражения "советской действительности" [The transformation of precedent phenomena in Vysotsky's "anti-fairy tales" is one way he artistically reflects "Soviet reality"] (in Russian). Научные ведомости Белгородского государственного университета. pp. 28–34.
