= Anti-fairy =

Anti-fairy may refer to:

- Anti-fairies, characters in The Fairly OddParents
- Anti-fairy tale, a fairy tale that has a tragic ending
