= Tonya and Nancy: The Inside Story =

- Genre: Biography; Drama; Sport
- Written by: Phil Penningroth
- Directed by: Larry Shaw
- Starring: Alexandra Powers; Heather Langenkamp
- Theme music composer: Dennis McCarthy
- Country of origin: United States
- Original language: English

Production
- Executive producer: Brian Pike
- Producers: Robert F. Phillips; Lynn Raynor
- Cinematography: Alan Caso
- Editor: Terry Blythe
- Running time: 95 min.
- Production companies: NBC Productions; Brian Pike Productions

Original release
- Network: NBC
- Release: April 30, 1994

Tonya & Nancy: The Inside Story is a 1994 American made-for-television biographical satirical-drama film written by Phil Penningroth and directed by Larry Shaw. It stars Alexandra Powers as Tonya Harding and Heather Langenkamp as Nancy Kerrigan and focuses on the 1994 Cobo Arena attack on Kerrigan and the extensive media coverage surrounding the infamous incident. It was released on NBC in April 1994, based on public domain material.

== Plot ==
The film portrays figure skaters Tonya Harding and Nancy Kerrigan, and the extensive media coverage following the infamous 1994 Cobo Arena attack on Kerrigan. It features a postmodern breaking of the fourth wall by having Dennis Boutsikaris play its screenwriter, addressing the audience over the course of the story. It also features, as labelled by Variety, various "witnesses" of Greek chorus actors, discussing their perspectives of different issues and themes as they emerge in the story. One of the last lines in it is "We imprisoned [Tonya and Nancy] in images we use to sell newspapers, soup, and TV movies. They're victims of those that the media serve".

== Cast ==
- Alexandra Powers as Tonya Harding
- Heather Langenkamp as Nancy Kerrigan
- James Wilder as Jeff Gillooly
- Susan Clark as LaVona Harding
- Dan Schneider as Shawn Eckardt
- Dennis Boutsikaris as the Screenplay Writer
- Bonnie Burroughs as Dody Teachman
- Steve Eastin as Ted Raynor, the FBI Agent
- Ellen Wheeler as Pam Bannister
- Lilyan Chauvin as the Skating Judge
- Michael Cavanaugh as Evy Scotvold
- Allan Wasserman as the Sports Agent
- Ellen Geer as the Former Skater
- John Di Fusco as the 1960s Activist
- Carlyle King as the Network Executive
- Robert Pine as the Network President

== Production ==
When asked about her role as Tonya, Alexandra Powers stated "In a lot of ways, it's the role of the year. Nothing like this ever happened in figure skating. Tonya and Nancy were all over the media, day in and day out. To me, Tonya has the best poker face I've ever seen. With all the controversy going down, she had a smile on her face. She still went to the Olympics. That makes an actor interested. She's either really innocent or deep in denial or she's insane."

== Release ==
The film premiered on NBC on April 30, 1994, with a rating of 10.4 and share of 19.

== Reception ==
Ray Loynd of Variety stated that Tonya & Nancy: The Inside Story "intelligently captures the chaos of the source material. The story may reek of moral squalor and may already be played out in the print and electronic media, but the moviemakers almost make it look fresh." He enjoyed how the "Rashomon-style multiple viewpoints and array of talking witnesses, presented à la the movie Reds, continually propel the narrative", giving it a satirical tone. Loynd liked how Alexandra Powers portrayed Harding as stranded between figure skating's culture of gentility and her rural heritage. He thought that the film did convey the pressures of competitive sports and the relentless demand to win. Loynd also admired the postmodern perspective of a scene with television network executives debating how to tell this very story.

Scott Williams of The Associated Press praised how writer Phil Penningroth framed the narrative cleverly, beginning with a close-up of Dennis Boutsikaris, as the film's screenwriter, musing "Sometimes, I think this could be a fairy tale...one of those strange dark tales, where monsters eat little children." He liked that Tonya & Nancy: The Inside Story was "interpretive", and thought it was generally well crafted, acted, and sometimes poignant. Williams wrote that Alexandra Powers successfully portrayed Harding's insecurities and vulnerability, and that director Larry Shaw kept the story engaging. He also wrote that, although the film could have been "a hasty 'ripped from the headlines' movie-of-the-week with cartoon characters...overacting stale emotions and restating public record", Tonya & Nancy emerged as less of an "evidence photo" and more of a character study.

John J. O'Connor of The New York Times wrote that the story held few surprises, yet he too admired Phil Penningroth's method of structuring the narrative. O'Connor liked the Dennis Boutsikaris character alluding to fairy tales while addressing the audience about Tonya and Nancy: "Once upon a time there were two little girls..." He praised how various perspectives were offered regarding the caricatures of "Nancy the Good" and "Tonya the Bad". O'Connor also enjoyed the metafictional scene of television network executives discussing how to produce Tonya & Nancy: "an ingenious ploy to undercut any suggestion of NBC cupidity". He liked that the film commented about how the Olympic ideal has evolved and thought that James Wilder portrayed Jeff Gillooly as a compelling character. O'Connor believed that Tonya & Nancy: The Inside Story generally avoided the artifice of other docudramas that "have a nasty habit of distorting facts." He also believed Harding was portrayed with fitting sympathy, as the film chronicled her undoing. The last line in the film was the screenwriter feeling sorry for her: "Some fairy tales don't have a happy ending".

Tom Jicha of the Sun-Sentinel also praised the film's narrative, but did not believe it offered an "inside story" with "significant information". He liked that two versions of Jeff Gillooly approaching the conspiracy meeting are presented, and that "it is up to the viewer to sort out what to believe". Jicha wrote that Tonya & Nancy: The Inside Story was "more Tonya's story than Nancy's", and noted that Harding's mother was portrayed as a greater "domineering" influence over Harding than Gillooly. He also liked that Nancy Kerrigan was represented compassionately with some dimension as she struggles with self-doubt. Jicha was also impressed that "NBC doesn't spare itself" in the cynical network executives scene.

Tom Shales of The Washington Post did not believe the film transcended the "tedious account of that big news story all America is sick to death of". Shales wrote that screenwriter Phil Penningroth did explore themes of celebrity, notoriety, and media ethics – but did so inadequately. He wrote that one of the weaknesses of the film was that none of the characters had a chance to be credible personalities. Shales thought that portions of the film bordered on cliché, although he did concede to some effective comedic moments. He praised the performances of Powers and Langenkamp, stating "Alexandra Powers and Heather Langenkamp do look like Tonya Harding and Nancy Kerrigan and do passable impressions."

The Baltimore Sun praised Langenkamp's portrayal of Kerrigan but was more negative towards Powers' performance stating "Ms. Langenkamp wastes a decent performance here, but Alexandra Powers of L.A. Law is woefully miscast as Tonya Harding."

The Los Angeles Times gave the film a negative review stating:

"By sharply criticizing itself for existing, Tonya & Nancy: The Inside Story is television's first movie in years to have its own out-of-body experience. Unfortunately, that in no way enhances the experience of watching it."
"Ridiculing Gillooly, Shawn Eckardt (Dan Schneider) and their fellow conspirators as clowns, Penningroth and director Larry Shaw try for some of the dark comedy deployed in HBO's Emmy-winning docu-parody The Positively True Adventures of the Alleged Texas Cheerleader-Murdering Mom. Instead, [this film] turns out to be just another dull movie about dull people. After squandering two hours on it, you may be asking: "Why me? Why anyone?"
