= Antihero =

Type of fictional character

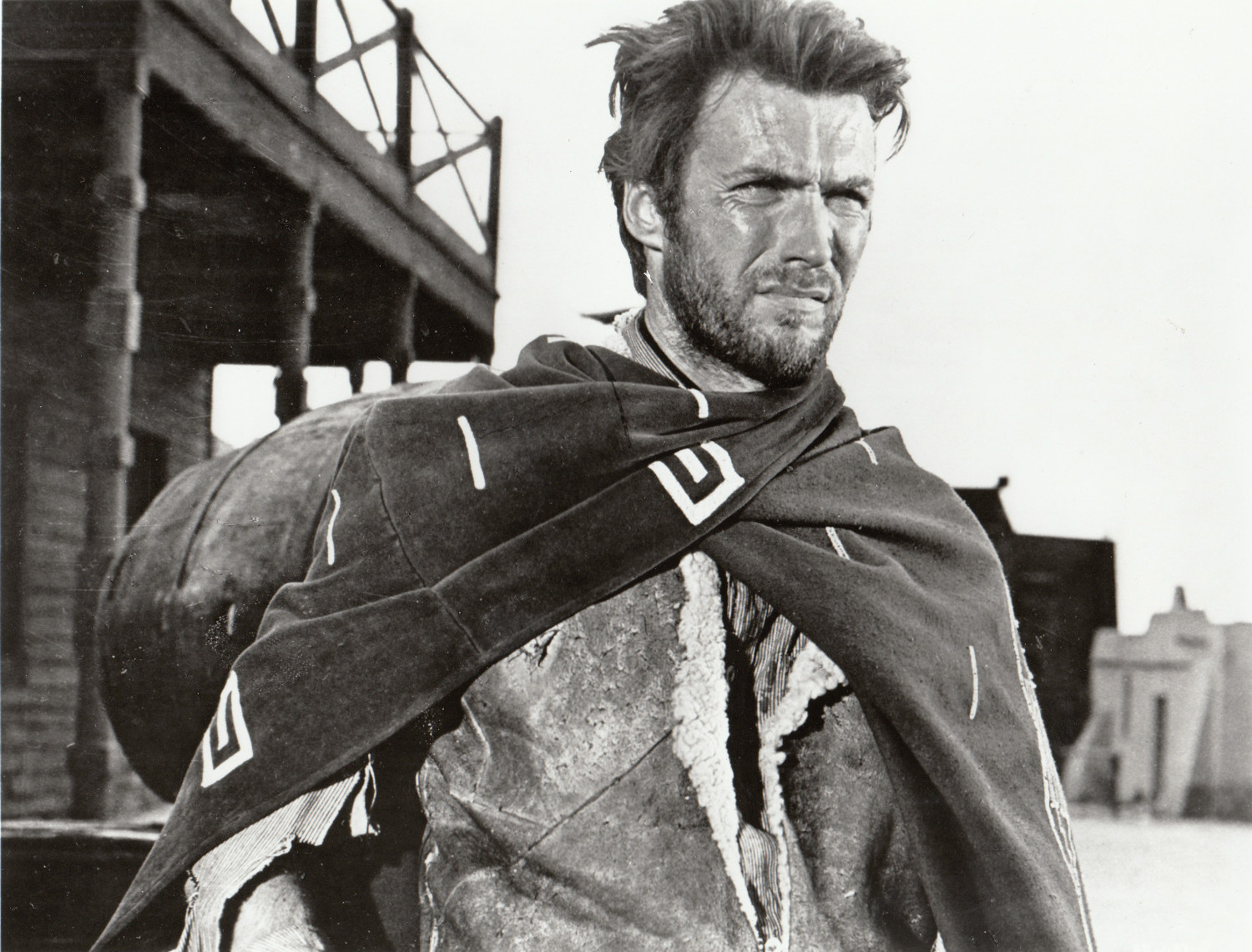
Revisionist Western films commonly feature antiheroes as lead characters whose actions are morally ambiguous. Clint Eastwood, pictured here in A Fistful of Dollars (1964), portrayed the archetypal antihero called the "Man with No Name" in the Italian Dollars Trilogy of Spaghetti Westerns.

Antihero (sometimes spelled as anti-hero or in two words as anti hero) is a literary term that can be understood as standing in opposition to the traditional hero (i.e., one with high social status, well-liked by the general populace). Rather than being nobility, or a super hero, an anti-hero is a regular person. Willy Loman from Death of a Salesman is the quintessential anti-hero, and Tolkien's hobbits, especially Frodo, are exemplars of the type.

The "Racinian" antihero is defined by three factors. The first is that the antihero is doomed to fail before their adventure begins. The second constitutes the blame of that failure on everyone but themselves. Thirdly, they offer a critique of social morals and reality.

Typically, an antihero is the focal point of conflict in a story, whether as the protagonist or as the antagonistic force. This is due to the antihero's engagement in the conflict, typically of their own will, rather than a specific calling to serve the greater good. As such, the antihero focuses on their personal motives first and foremost, with everything else secondary.

== Etymology ==
The term antihero was first used as early as 1714, emerging in works such as Rameau's Nephew in the 18th century, and is also used more broadly to cover Byronic heroes as well, created by the English poet Lord Byron.

== History ==
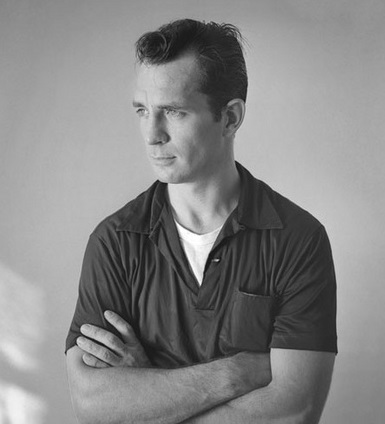
During the 1950s, U.S. writer Jack Kerouac and other figures of the "Beat Generation" created reflective, critical protagonists who influenced the antiheroes of many later works.

=== Classical literature ===
An early antihero is Homer's Thersites, since he serves to voice criticism, showcasing an anti-establishment stance. The concept has also been identified in classical Greek drama, Roman satire, and Renaissance literature such as Don Quixote and the picaresque rogue.

An anti-hero that fits the more contemporary notion of the term is the lower-caste warrior Karna in the Mahabharata. Karna is the sixth brother of the Pandavas (symbolising good), born out of wedlock, and raised by a lower-caste charioteer. He is ridiculed by the Pandavas, but accepted as an excellent warrior by the antagonist Duryodhana, thus becoming a loyal friend to him, eventually fighting on the wrong side of the final just war. Karna serves as a critique of the then-society, the protagonists, as well as the idea of the war being worthwhile itself – even if Krishna later justifies it properly.

=== 19th century ===
Literary Romanticism in the 19th century helped popularize new forms of the antihero, such as the Gothic double. The antihero eventually became an established form of social criticism, a phenomenon often associated with the unnamed protagonist in Fyodor Dostoevsky's Notes from Underground. The antihero emerged as a foil to the traditional hero archetype, a process that Northrop Frye called the fictional "center of gravity". This movement indicated a literary change in heroic ethos from feudal aristocrat to urban democrat, as was the shift from epic to ironic narratives.

Huckleberry Finn (1884) has been called "the first antihero in the American nursery". Charlotte Mullen of Somerville and Ross's The Real Charlotte (1894) has been described as an anti-heroine.

=== Early 20th century ===
The antihero became prominent in early 20th-century existentialist works such as Franz Kafka's The Metamorphosis (1915), Jean-Paul Sartre's Nausea (1938), and Albert Camus's The Stranger (1942). The protagonist in these works is an indecisive central character who drifts through his life and is marked by boredom, angst, and alienation.

=== 1950s–1970s ===
The British version of the antihero emerged in the works of the "angry young men" of the 1950s. The antihero simultaneously entered American literature and cinema in the 1950s and up to the mid-1960s as an alienated figure, unable to communicate. The American antihero of the 1950s and 1960s was typically more proactive than his French counterpart.

The collective protests of Sixties counterculture saw the solitary antihero gradually eclipsed from fictional prominence, though not without subsequent revivals in literary and cinematic form.

The "angry young man" film movement in India originated in the early 1970s with the Hindi films of Salim–Javed, and was personified by the actor Amitabh Bachchan.

=== 2000s to present ===
During the 2000s and early 2020s, antiheroes such as Tony Soprano, Jack Bauer, Gregory House, Dexter Morgan, Walter White, Frank Underwood, Don Draper, Neal Caffrey, Nucky Thompson, Jax Teller, Alicia Florrick, Annalise Keating, Selina Meyer and Kendall Roy became prominent in the most popular and critically acclaimed TV shows.

By the 2020s, television scholarship had expanded to include the "antiheroine," examining complex women protagonists who subvert traditional gender expectations of nurturing and compliance. In Postheroic Heroes – A Contemporary Image (German: Postheroische Helden – Ein Zeitbild), German sociologist Ulrich Bröckling examines the simultaneity of heroic and post-heroic role models as an opportunity to explore the place of the heroic in contemporary society. In contemporary art, artists such as the French multimedia artist Thomas Liu Le Lann negotiate in his series of Soft Heroes, in which overburdened, modern and tired Anti Heroes seem to have given up on the world around them.

== See also ==
- Anti-fairy tale
- Antinovel
- False protagonist
- List of fictional antiheroes
