= Alexandra Powers =

American former actress (active 1980–2001)

- Born: September 9, 1967 (age 59); New York City, U.S.
- Occupation: Actress
- Years active: 1980–2001
- Spouse(s): Barry Del Sherman (m. 1993–199?); Gavin Potter (m. 2000–?)
- Mother: Katharyn Powers

Alexandra Powers is an American former actress.

== Early life ==
Powers was born on September 9, 1967, in New York City. She grew up in an "artsy, liberal environment" on both coasts with her divorced parents. Powers' mother wrote for television programs including Fantasy Island and Charlie's Angels. Her father teaches acting. At the age of six, Powers announced her intentions to become an actress.

== Career ==
Powers appeared in various television and film roles, including Cast a Deadly Spell, 21 Jump Street, and Dead Poets Society. In the film Rising Sun, Powers portrayed a prostitute who attempted to seduce the character played by actor Wesley Snipes. She also had a recurring role on the NBC legal drama L.A. Law. She portrayed "Dusty Brown" in the NBC miniseries A Matter of Justice. On being successfully cast in the NBC program Tonya and Nancy, Powers commented, "In a lot of ways, it's the role of the year". For the program, she received ice-skating lessons from Dody Teachman, former coach to Tonya Harding. In a review for The Orlando Sentinel, Powers received a positive reception: "It should be said that Powers, the Christian lawyer on L.A. Law, is a dead ringer for Tonya ... and that she delivers a convincing performance."

== Personal life ==
Powers said in an interview that her parents "encouraged me to find my own truth". Commenting on her faith, she stated "I pray whenever I feel sad. And I believe that whatever is right will work out." In that same interview, she said that her father was Roman Catholic and her mother Katharyn Powers was interested in metaphysics.

In the early 1990s, Powers said she did not adhere to any religion: "I've sort of looked and searched. I was a Buddhist for about six months." She was married to actor Barry Del Sherman in December 1993, and publicly lamented: "I have to take my ring off when I go to work. And that makes me sad, because I put the ring on and I don't want to ever have to take it off."

In the late 1990s she started following Scientology, the set of beliefs and practices invented by the American author L. Ron Hubbard, and by 2000 had married Gavin Potter and joined Hubbard's Sea Organization of the Church of Scientology.

== Filmography ==
=== Film ===
Year	Title	Role	Notes
1983	The Prodigal	Nancy Pringle	
1985	Mask	Lisa	
1988	Plain Clothes	Daun-Marie Zeffer	
1989	Sonny Boy	Rose	
1989	Dead Poets Society	Chris Noel	
1992	The Player	Herself	
1993	The Seventh Coin	Ronnie Segal	a.k.a. Worlds Apart
1993	Rising Sun	Julia	
1996	Last Man Standing	Lucy Kolinski	
1996	Race	Sylvie	
1997	Out to Sea	Shelly	
1998	One Hell of a Guy	Cassie Springer	Direct-to-video
1999	Storm	Major Tanya Goodman	Direct-to-video; a.k.a. Twister II: Extreme Tornado
2001	Zigs	Sara	a.k.a. Double Down

=== Television ===
Year	Title	Role	Notes
1983	Jennifer Slept Here	Cassidy	1 episode
1983	T. J. Hooker	Sally	1 episode
1984	Silence of the Heart	Andrea	Television movie
1986	Highway to Heaven	Arlene	1 episode
1986	Family Ties	Erin	2 episodes
1987	CBS Schoolbreak Special	Laura Sanders	1 episode
1988	CBS Summer Playhouse	Beth	1 episode
1988	Unholy Matrimony	Patricia "Trish" Jaworsky	Television movie
1989	The Hogan Family	Princess Julia	3 episodes
1990	Dangerous Pursuit		Television movie
1990	21 Jump Street	Officer Kati Rocky	2 episodes
1991	Cast a Deadly Spell	Olivia Hackshaw	Television movie
1993	The Young Indiana Jones Chronicles	Gloria	1 episode
1993	A Matter of Justice	Kathy Charlene "Dusty" Brown	Television movie
1993–1994	L.A. Law	Jane Halliday	22 episodes
1994	Tonya and Nancy: The Inside Story	Tonya Harding	Television movie
1994	Following Her Heart	Nola Lundquist	Television movie
1997	C-16: FBI	Dana Morrison	1 episode
1998	Nobody Lives Forever	Detective Mary Ellen "Dusty" Dustin	Television movie
1998	Maximum Bob	Angelyne Linklater	1 episode
1998	Fantasy Island		1 episode
1999	Brimstone	Ann "Sally" McGee	1 episode
