= Faraway Tsardom =

Mythical kingdom in Russian folklore

The Faraway Tsardom is an undefined realm of East Slavic folklore into which the hero fell or separated from the ordinary world by an impenetrable dense forests, abysses, seas or other obstacles. In Russian language it is referred to as Тридевятое царство ( literally "Thrice-ninth Tsardom" (Note: While "тридевять" superficially looks like a numeric in radix-nine numeric system, no such system is attested anywhere, and this is in fact a folkloric expression referring to something very far away.)), тридесятое царство ( literally "Thrice-tenth Tsardom"; the word тридцать ("thirty") is a contraction of archaic "тридесять").

Some fairy tales use the phrase "In distant lands..." (За тридевять земель...). Example : "In distant lands in the faraway tsardom, beyond the fiery river lives Baba Yaga" (За тридевять земель в тридесятом царстве, за огненной рекою живёт баба-яга) (s:ru:Народные_русские_сказки_(Афанасьев)/Марья_Моревна)

== History ==
In this distant land, a proud and domineering princess reigns, serpents, the firebird, golden-maned horses live, rejuvenating apples grow, springs with living and dead water flow. Sometimes this realm is located underground, but it can also be located on a mountain or under water.

The firebird is always golden in her hot feathers. This feature, as well as its golden cage, is connected with the fact that the bird arrives from another, "Thrice-ninth tsardom", from where everything painted in golden color comes.

The hero comes to this realm for a stolen beauty, for curiosities, rejuvenating apples and living and healing water, which give eternal youth and health. In some tales, Thrice-ninth Tsardom is located underground. There are gardens with fruitful trees. It is also connected with the horizon, thunder can be heard in it.

In the opinion of the Russian folklorist Vladimir Propp, Thrice-ninth tsardom is associated with the views of the Slavs about the other world.

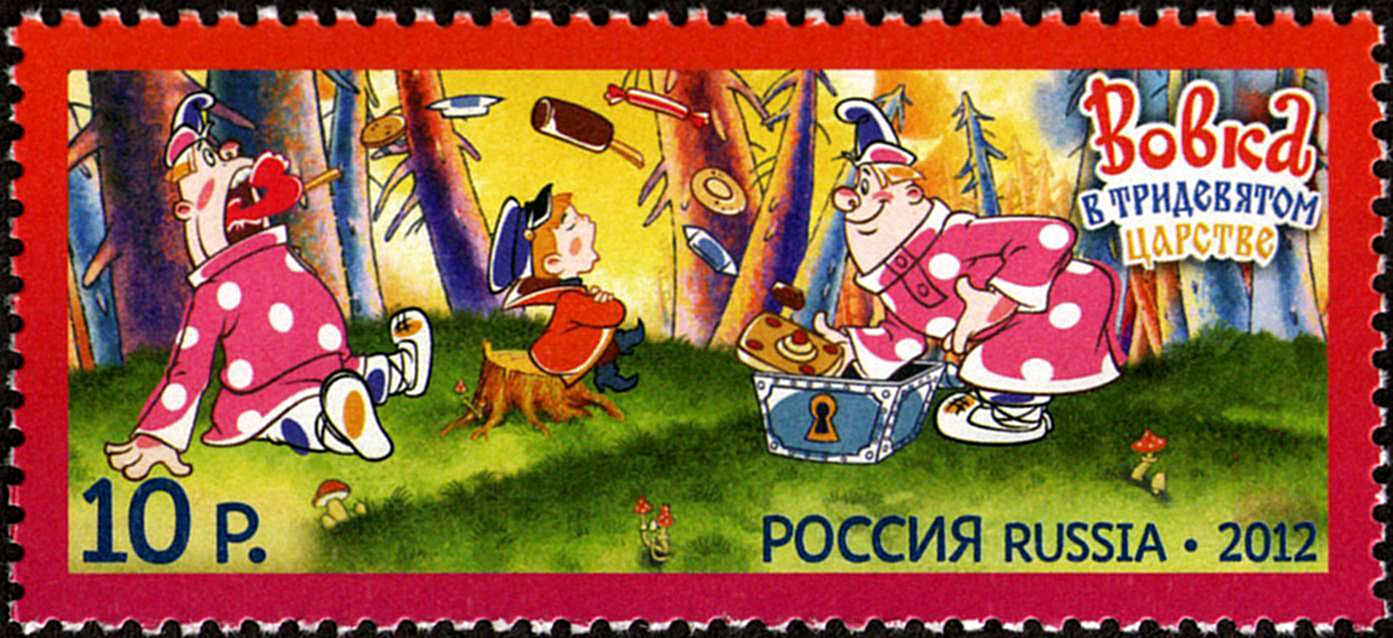
Vovka in Faraway Tsardom, 1965 Soyuzmultfilm's animated film. Stamp of Russia in 2012.

Often, the purpose of the hero's journey to the Thrice-ninth tsardom is to obtain or return a bride to himself. On his way, the hero of a folktale almost always encounters an obstacle in the form of a "dark and dense" forest. In many tales, in the forest there is a hut on chicken legs. Sometimes the faraway realm is separated from the familiar world by a fiery river with a bridge, sea or abyss.

From The Blue Suite Sewn to the Left
by Belarusian folklore

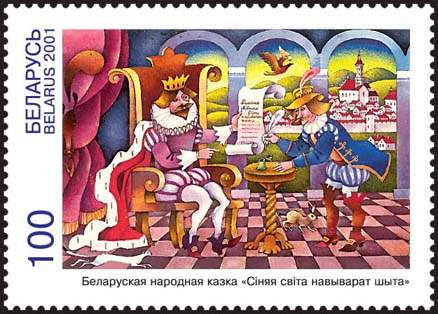

Як бегчы, дык бегчы — забег у трыдзевятае царства.
А ў тым царстве быў дужа вялікі луг.
Прыбег ён на той луг і перакінуўся ў тры кветкі.

If run, then run; so he run into the thrice-ninth tsardom.
And in that kingdom there was a very large meadow.
He ran into that meadow and turned himself into three flowers.

== See also ==
- Iriy
- Lukomorye
- Nav

== Bibliography ==
- Лызлова Анастасия Сергеевна (2019). Cказки о трех царствах (медном, серебряном и золотом) в лубочной литературе и фольклорной традиции [FAIRY TALES ABOUT THREE KINGDOMS (THE COPPER, SILVER AND GOLD ONES) IN POPULAR LITERATURE AND RUSSIAN FOLK TRADITION]. Проблемы исторической поэтики, 17 (1): 26–44. URL: https://cyberleninka.ru/article/n/ckazki-o-treh-tsarstvah-mednom-serebryanom-i-zolotom-v-lubochnoy-literature-i-folklornoy-traditsii (дата обращения: 24.09.2021). (In Russian)
- Матвеева, Р. П. (2013). Русские сказки на сюжет «Три подземных царства» в сибирском репертуаре [RUSSIAN FAIRY TALES ON THE PLOT «THREE UNDERGROUND KINGDOMS» IN THE SIBERIAN REPERTOIRE]. Вестник Бурятского государственного университета. Философия, (10): 170–175. URL: https://cyberleninka.ru/article/n/russkie-skazki-na-syuzhet-tri-podzemnyh-tsarstva-v-sibirskom-repertuare (дата обращения: 24.09.2021). (In Russian)
- Терещенко Анна Васильевна (2017). Фольклорный сюжет «Три царства» в сопоставительном аспекте: на материале русских и селькупских сказок [COMPARATIVE ANALYSIS OF THE FOLKLORE PLOT “THREE STOLEN PRINCESSES”: RUSSIAN AND SELKUP FAIRY TALES DATA]. Вестник Томского государственного педагогического университета, (6 (183)): 128–134. URL: https://cyberleninka.ru/article/n/folklornyy-syuzhet-tri-tsarstva-v-sopostavitelnom-aspekte-na-materiale-russkih-i-selkupskih-skazok (дата обращения: 24.09.2021). (In Russian)
- Будур Н. В. Тридесятое (тридевятое) царство // Сказочная энциклопедия / общ. ред. Н. В. Будур. — М.: Олма-Пресс, 2005. — С. 495. — ISBN 5-224-04818-4. (In Ukrainian)
- Казаченко Б. Тридесятое (тридевятое) царство // Наука и жизнь: журнал. — М., 2007. — № 10. — С. 112—118. — ISSN 0028-1263. (In Ukrainian)
