= A Matter of Justice =

1993 American television movie

- Screenplay by: Dennis Turner
- Directed by: Michael Switzer
- Starring: Patty Duke; Martin Sheen
- Theme music composer: David Michael Frank
- Country of origin: United States
- Original language: English

Production
- Producers: Bernadette Caulfield; Ardythe Goergens
- Cinematography: Robert Draper
- Editor: Mark W. Rosenbaum
- Running time: 240 minutes
- Production companies: Hill-Fields Entertainment; Ron Gilbert Associates

Original release
- Network: NBC
- Release: November 7, 1993

A Matter of Justice is a 1993 American television film directed by Michael Switzer and starring Patty Duke and Martin Sheen. Televised in two parts, it is based on a true story.

== Premise ==
A true story about the mother of a murdered Marine seeking to bring her son's widow to justice and gain custody of her granddaughter.

== Cast ==
- Patty Duke as Mary Brown
- Martin Sheen as Jack Brown
- Alexandra Powers as Kathy Charlene "Dusty" Brown
- Jason London as Lance Corporal Chris Randall Brown
- Jeff Kober as Talbot
- Cole Hauser as Private Ralph G. "Rocky" Jackson
- Danny Nucci as Private Vince Grella
- T. Max Graham as Harry Amblin
- Charles S. Dutton as Mr. McDaniel, Private Investigator

== Production ==
Filming occurred in Kansas.
