= Lukomorye =

Historic region in Russia

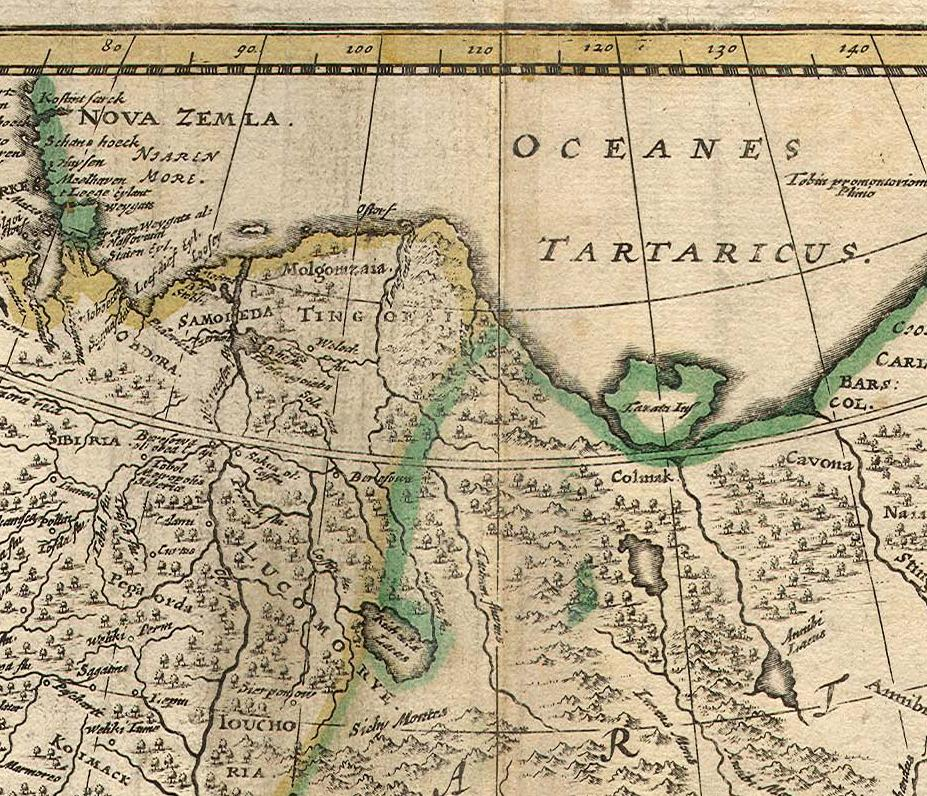
A fragment of a 17th-century map by Gerrit van Schagen that shows Lucomorie

Lukomorye, Lukomorie or Lukomorje (Russian: Лукомо́рье) was a region in ancient Russian lands and is described and depicted not only in Russian sources, but also in different non-Russian old sources. Lukomorye is also a prominent fictional location in Russian folklore.

== Etymology ==
The Russian word itself is an old term for "bight" or "bay". In the word "luk-o-mor-ye", "-o-" is an interfix used to connect two roots, "-ye" is an affix (in this case, of relative location), "luk-" is the root for "bend", "mor-" is the root for "sea". It can also be translated as "curved sea-shore" or "inlet of the sea".

== Middle Ages geography and Early Russian manuscripts ==
The toponym "Sea Bend" (лука моря, luka morya) and the derivations: lukomorye, lukomorians, etc., have been applied to various geographical locations. It is mentioned in The Tale of Igor's Campaign and the Russian chronicles. According to the chronicles, Lukomorye was inhabited by the nomadic Polovtsy people, and the researchers locate it in the region north of the Sea of Azov, where Polovtsy lived in the 11th—12th centuries. These accounts are seen as a source of inspiration for Alexander Pushkin. In modern Russian culture, the word Lukomorye is most commonly associated with Pushkin's fairy tale poem Ruslan and Lyudmila, starting with the line: "There is a green oak-tree by the lukomorye, …" (У лукоморья дуб зелёный, ...; U lukomorya dub zelyony, …).

The land of "Lucomoria" was also depicted in a number of antique maps of Siberia/Moscovia. Cartographers followed the descriptions of Sigismund von Herberstein in his 1549 Notes on Muscovite Affairs:

...which they barter with the Grustintzi and Serponovtzi : these latter people derive their name from the fortress of Serponov Lucomoryae, situated in the mountains beyond the river Oby.
It is said that a certain marvellous and incredible occurrence, and very like a fable, happens every year to the people of Lucomoryae, namely, that they die on the 27th of November, which among the Russians is dedicated to St. George, and come to life again like the frosts in the following spring, generally on the 24th of April.
...
The Cossin is a river which flows down from the mountains of Lucomorya; at its mouth is the fortress of Cossin, which was formerly possessed by the Knes Ventza, but now by his sons.
From the sources of the great river Cossin to this point is a journey of two months. Moreover, from the sources of the same river, rises another river Cassima, which, after passing through the district of Lucomorya, flows into the great river Tachnin; beyond which are said to dwell men of prodigious stature, some of whom are covered all over with hair, like wild beasts, while others have heads like dogs, and others have no necks, their breast occupying the place of a head, while they have long hands, but no feet.

Giles Fletcher in his Of the Russe Common Wealth repeats the fantastic tale of dying/resurrecting Lukomorians.

== Cultural references ==
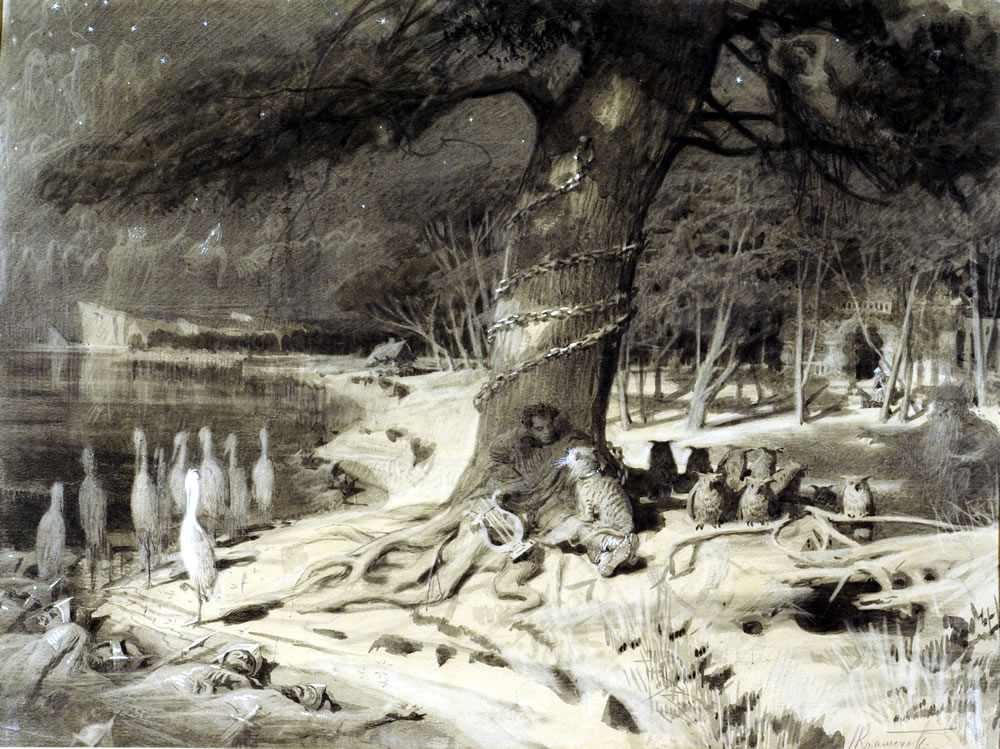
Illustration to the prologue of Ruslan and Lyudmila, showing the oak of Lukomorye and other mythical elements. Ivan Kramskoy, 1879.

"У лукоморья дуб зеленый..."
Excerpt from "Ruslan and Ludmila"

- Widely known in Russia is the prologue to the fairy tale poem Ruslan and Lyudmila by Aleksandr Pushkin which starts with the line "У лукоморья дуб зелёный" ("There is a green oak by Lukomorye").
- Lukomorye magazine, illustrated literary and satirical magazine (Russia, 1914-1917)
- Vladimir Vysotsky has a humorous "anti-fairy-tale" song "Lukomorye no longer exists".
- Chains of Lukomorye is an announced upcoming video game that includes "Slavic realm of Lukomorye"

== See also ==
- Faraway Tsardom
- Hyperborea
