= Kapustnik =

Russian tradition of celebration

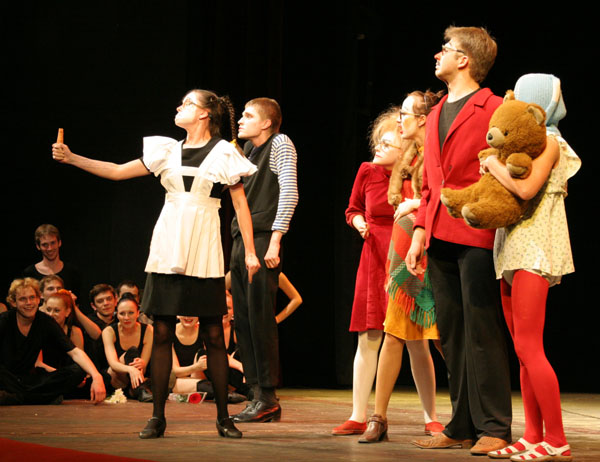
Student kapustnik for the theater faculty of the Saratov Conservatory (2008)

Kapustnik (Russian: капустник, which could be translated in English as "cabbage festival" or "cabbage party") is the Russian tradition of celebration. Generally, it is a medley of well-known songs, in which all the lyrics have been changed to celebrate (or poke fun at) the guests of honor. A typical kapustnik may have several scenes, lasting approximately 10 minutes, and is performed by one or more singers or actors with piano accompaniment, or karaoke-style playback.

== Background ==
=== Origins ===
The Russian word kapustnik refers to cabbage: in the 18th century, kapustniki referred to "harvesting and processing cabbage at the invitation of one's neighbors". It usually involved the women of a village gathering to chop cabbage—which happened to be a long and laborious event. This pertained to the forty days of Lent; people had to abstain from meat, milk, and other animal products, which made cabbage the common food in meals. After chopping the cabbage up and soaking it in brine, people were able to get much of the nutrition they lacked during winter months. The kapustnik pie was baked using the leftover cabbage from the brining barrel. The women at these gatherings often enjoyed each other's company, talking, gossiping, and singing among other things. As Lent restricted the Russians' diet as well as social activity, kapustniki in the form variety shows began in the 19th century. Like cabbage pie, a kapustnik showcases its variety of layers that make up a delicious—and entertaining—product. They were often performed at this time in houses of Russian nobility.

=== Theatre tradition ===
Outside of parties, kapustniki are a tradition in Russian theatre. To have one, actors choose an evening when no performance is planned and show their own funny plays for each other. Although rarely is anyone from outside the theatre's staff invited, many fans try to get in anyway. Due to their questionable copyright, kapustniks can rarely be broadcast or recorded.

An important person in the kapustnik history is Mikhail Shchepkin, one of Russia's most famous actors who rose in fame at the Moscow Maly Theater in the middle of the 19th century. He hosted a great number of post-show parties at his home, where, as a skilled storyteller, he would grab everyone's attention. These gatherings involved much game-playing and improvised performances for actors and writers to poke fun at one another; this came to be known as the satirical kapustnik.

It was not until the early 20th century that the kapustnik became an official form of theatre; the first paying one was staged in 1910 at the Moscow Arts Theatre. This public kapustnik had evolved because the audience was now involved and most productions included satire of current events. This new humor typically poked fun at tricky, intelligent jokes rather than playful ones. Constantin Stanislavski, director of the theatre at the time of the premiere, helped influence the form of other successful ones to come. He was very skilled and understanding of the specific humor needed for kapustniki: "It was just a comic dig at pretense, a caricature of the funny side of things, a satire on the corruptibility [of real problems]."

The following is a description of a typical successful act (here a circus act in the middle of a kapustnik):

"Stanislavsky, as the ringmaster, appeared in top hat and tails, with a huge nose and black mustache. He cracked a whip, and onto the stage galloped a trained stallion, played by another actor. The sketch ended with a quadrille performed by the whole troupe, riding on hobby-horses."

=== Kapustiki (village dances) ===
In a typical Russian village, kapustiki (a variety word of kapustniki) dancing activities followed a night of games and songs. Spring was a popular time for these. Often good-humored and sentimental, the games ranged from "bride and groom" games to "Zavivat Berezku", which involved curling the branches of a birch tree (Russia's national tree) to attract a boyfriend. There were bonfires and mummers wearing animal masks to add to the festivities. The kapustiki dances are accompanied by flutes and balalaikas. Kapustiki have not always been accepted in Russia's changing society. When Christianity became the prominent religion in a region, priests often prohibited dances, like the kapustiki, and replaced them by sviatye or "saintly" events, created to ensure appropriate censorship from sin for the people.

== Miscellaneous ==
Russian for "cabbage eater", kapustnik is another name for the Steller's sea cow, a large sea animal with origins in the North Pacific Ocean; it is presumed extinct since 1768.
