= Antinovel =

Experimental work of fiction that avoids the familiar conventions of the novel

An antinovel is any experimental work of fiction that avoids the familiar conventions of the novel, and instead establishes its own conventions.

== Origin of the term ==
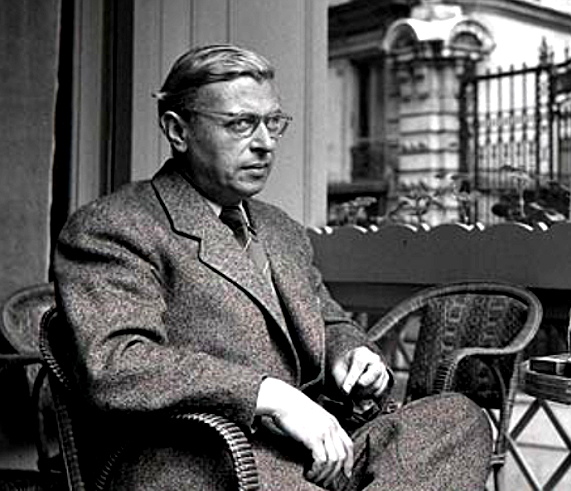
Jean-Paul Sartre coined the term "antinovel"

The term ("anti-roman" in French) was brought into modern literary discourse by the French philosopher and critic Jean-Paul Sartre in his introduction to Nathalie Sarraute's 1948 work Portrait d’un inconnu (Portrait of a Man Unknown). However the term "anti-roman" (anti-novel) had been used by Charles Sorel in 1633 to describe the parodic nature of his prose fiction Le Berger extravagant.

== Characteristics ==
The antinovel usually fragments and distorts the experience of its characters, presenting events outside of chronological order and attempting to disrupt the idea of characters with unified and stable personalities. Some principal features of antinovels include lack of obvious plot, minimal development of character, variations in time sequence, experiments with vocabulary and syntax, and alternative endings and beginnings. Extreme features may include detachable or blank pages, drawings, and hieroglyphs.

== History ==
Although the term is most commonly applied to the French nouveau roman of the 1940s, 1950s and 1960s, similar traits can be found much farther back in literary history. One example is Laurence Sterne's Tristram Shandy, a seemingly autobiographical novel that barely makes it as far as the title character's birth thanks to numerous digressions and a rejection of linear chronology. Aron Kibédi Varga has suggested that the novel in fact began as an antinovel, since the first novels such as Don Quixote and later in the 20th century Naked Lunch, subverted their form even as they were constructing the form of the novel.

It was however in the postwar decades that the term first came into critical and general prominence. To C. P. Snow, the antinovel appeared as "an expression of that nihilism that fills the vacuum created by the withdrawal of positive directives for living", and as an ignoble scene in which "the characters buzz about sluggishly like winter flies". More technically however, its distinctive feature was the anti-mimetic and self-reflective drawing of attention to its own fictionality, a parodic anti-realistic element. Paradoxically, such anti-conventionalism would eventually come to form a distinctive convention of its own.

== See also ==
- Nouveau roman
- Anti-fairy tale
