= Anti-fairy tale =

Fairy tale with a tragic ending, rather than a happy one

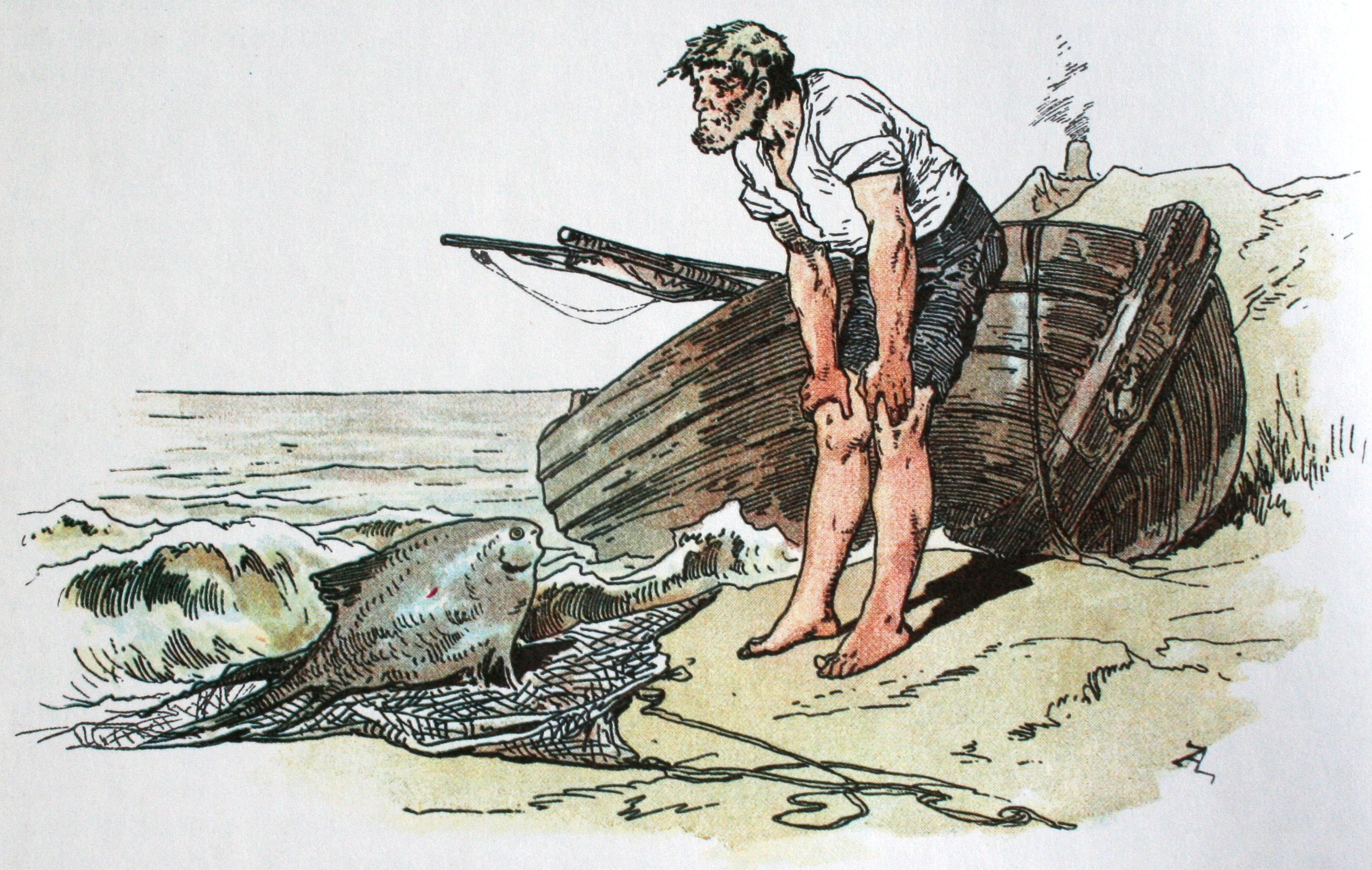
"The Fisherman and His Wife" illustration by Alexander Zick

An anti-fairy tale, also called anti-tale, is a fairy tale which, unlike an ordinary one, has a tragic, rather than a happy ending, with the antagonists winning and the protagonists losing at the end of the story. Whereas fairy tales paint a magical, utopian world, anti-fairy tales paint a dark world of nastiness and cruelty. Such stories incorporate horror, black comedy, mean-spirited practical jokes on innocent characters, sudden and often cruel plot twists, and biting satire. The term (German: Antimärchen) was introduced by André Jolles in his Einfache Formen (1930).

Examples of anti-fairy tales include "The Fisherman and His Wife", and "The Swineherd". A recent example is Fabien Vehlmann's graphic novel Beautiful Darkness.

The term is also used to refer to remakes of traditional "happy" fairy tales into "unhappy" ones.

== See also ==
- Anti-hero
- Antinovel
