= Intervention (1968 film) =

- Directed by: Gennadi Poloka
- Written by: Lev Slavin
- Produced by: S. Rabinov; Vladimir Semenets
- Starring: Vladimir Vysotsky; Valeri Zolotukhin
- Cinematography: Vladimir Burykin; Yevgeny Mezentsev
- Music by: Sergey Slonimsky
- Production company: Lenfilm
- Release date: 10 May 1987
- Running time: 102 minutes
- Country: Soviet Union
- Language: Russian

Intervention (Russian: Интервенция, romanized: Interventsiya) is a 1968 Russian historical musical film directed by Gennadi Poloka. The film was banned in the Soviet Union for nearly 20 years and was released only in 1987.

== Cast ==
- Vladimir Vysotsky as Michel Voronov / Brodsky
- Valeri Zolotukhin as Zhenka Xidias, student of Odessa University
- Olga Aroseva as Banker Xidias, Zhenka's mother, rich widow
- Gelena Ivlieva as Sanyka alias Fyokla, flower-girl, Bolshevik
- Yefim Kopelyan as Philipp, main thief of Odessa
- Rufina Nifontova as Madame Tokarchuk, Mokrushnitsa (criminal jargon — female homicide)
- Vladimir Tatosov as Imertsaki, card-sharper
- Marlen Khutsiev as Philippe Henri Joseph d'Anselme
- Georgy Shtil as Martial, French soldier
- Boris Leskin as businessman
