= Vladimir Nazarov =

Vladimir Nazarov may refer to:

- Vladimir Nazarov (composer) (born 1952), Russian composer, singer, actor, film director, artistic director
- Vladimir Nazarov (footballer) (born 2002), Uzbek footballer
