= Papkin =

Papkin may refer to:

- Aleksandr Papkin (1936–2007) Soviet and Russian diplomat
- Józef Papkin, fictional character from the 1838 Polish comedy The Revenge by Aleksander Fredro and in its film adaptations
- Papkin, nickname of Polish actor Tomasz Dedek when he collaborated with Communist Polish secret service

== See also ==
- Pupkin
