= Master of the Taiga =

- Russian poster
- Russian: Хозяин тайги
- Directed by: Vladimir Nazarov
- Written by: Boris Mozhayev
- Starring: Valeriy Zolotukhin; Vladimir Vysotskiy; Lionella Pyryeva; Mikhail Kokshenov; Dmitry Masanov
- Cinematography: Vladimir Nikolayev
- Music by: Leonid Afanasyev
- Release date: 1968
- Country: Soviet Union
- Language: Russian

Master of the Taiga (Russian: Хозяин тайги) is a 1968 Soviet crime film directed by Vladimir Nazarov.

== Plot ==
The film takes place in one village in which the store is robbed. A forest rafter admits a crime, but the young detective doubts it.

== Cast ==
- Valeriy Zolotukhin as Detective Vasili Snezhkin
- Vladimir Vysotskiy
- Lionella Pyryeva
- Mikhail Kokshenov
- Dmitry Masanov
- Leonid Kmit
- Eduard Bredun
- Ivan Kosykh
- Pavel Shpringfeld
- Vladimir Lippart
