= Vladimir Vysotsky =

Soviet entertainer and poet (1938–1980)

- Владимир Высоцкий
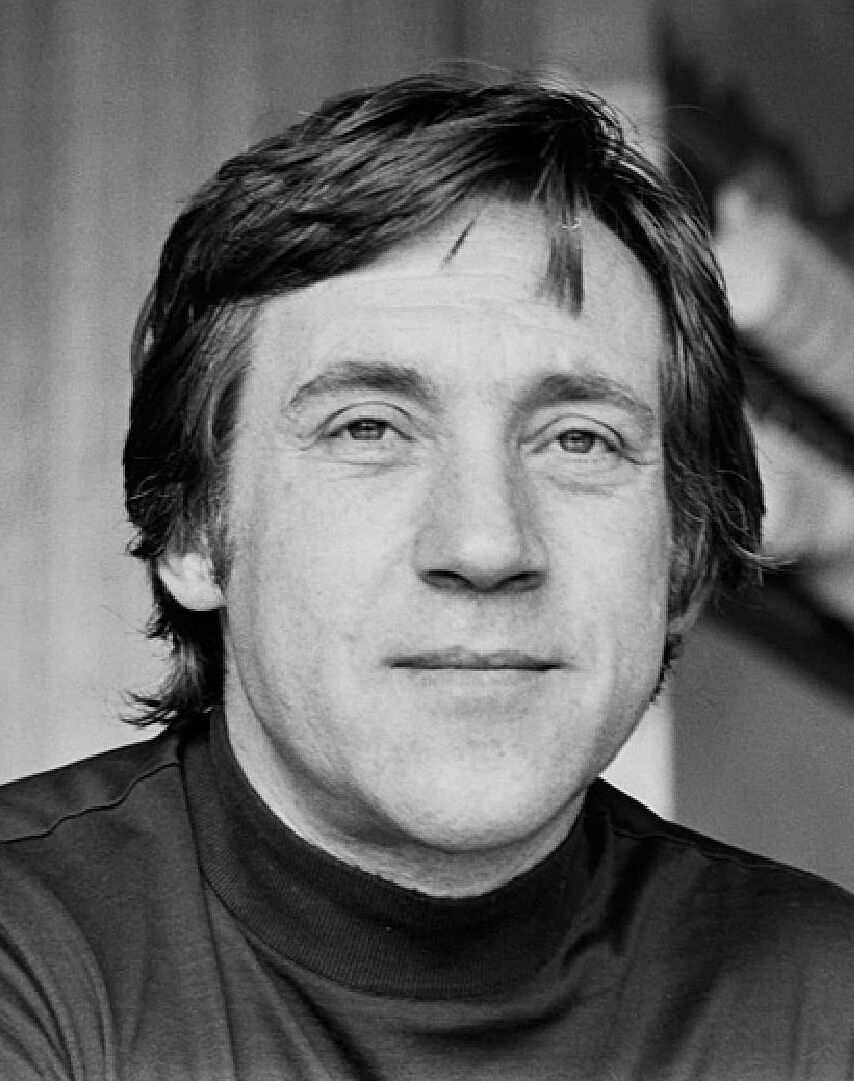
- Born: 25 January 1938; Moscow, Soviet Union
- Died: 25 July 1980 (aged 42); Moscow, Soviet Union
- Resting place: Vagankovo Cemetery
- Education: Moscow Art Theatre School
- Occupations: Singer; songwriter; poet; actor
- Years active: 1959–1980
- Spouses: Iza Zhukova (m. 1960; div. 1965); Lyudmila Abramova (m. 1965; div. 1970); Marina Vlady (m. 1970)
- Children: 2
- Awards: USSR State Prize (1987)
- Musical career
- Genres: Bard; rock; pop; folk
- Instruments: Vocals; guitar; piano

Signature
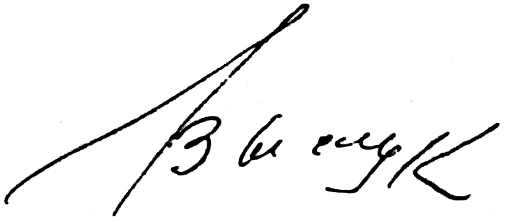

Vladimir Semyonovich Vysotsky (Note: Russian: Владимир Семёнович Высоцкий, romanized: Vladimir Semyonovich Vysotsky, IPA: [vlɐˈdʲimʲɪr sʲɪˈmʲɵnəvʲɪtɕ vɨˈsotskʲɪj]) (Note: In this name that follows East Slavic naming customs, the patronymic is Semyonovich and the family name is Vysotsky.) (25 January 1938 – 25 July 1980) was a Soviet singer, songwriter, poet and actor who had an immense and enduring effect on Soviet culture. He became widely known for his unique singing style and for his lyrics, which featured social and political commentary in often-humorous street jargon. He was also a prominent stage and screen actor. Although the official Soviet cultural establishment largely ignored his work, he was remarkably popular during his lifetime and has exerted significant influence on many of Russia's musicians and actors.

== Early life ==
Vysotsky was born on 25 January 1938, at the 3rd Meshchanskaya Street (61/2) maternity hospital in Moscow. His father was Semyon Vladimirovich (Volfovich) Vysotsky, a Jewish man who came originally from Kiev. His mother, Nina Maksimovna Vysotsky (née Seryogina), was Russian, and worked as a German translator. The family lived in a communal flat at No. 126, 1st Meshchanskaya Street.

Vladimir's theatrical inclinations became obvious at an early age, and were supported by his mother, herself a great fan of theatre. Vysotsky later recalled: "I didn't have anyone in my family who was an actor or a director [...] nobody who was in the arts. But my mother really loved theatre, and every Saturday—from the very earliest age until I was about thirteen or fourteen—she would take me to the theatre. And that probably stuck." His paternal grandmother Dora Bronshteyn also supported his interests. The boy used to recite poems, standing on a chair and "flinging hair backwards, like a real poet," and often used expressions he could hardly have heard at home. Once, at the age of two, when he had tired of the family's guests' poetry requests, he, according to his mother, sat himself under the New Year tree with a frustrated air about him and sighed: "You freeloaders, let the child rest!" (Note: "Darmoyedy! Dayte rebenku otdohnut'!" («Дармоеды! Дайте ребенку отдохнуть!..»)) His sense of humor was extraordinary, but often baffling for people around him. At three years old he would jeer at his father while the latter was in the bathroom, breaking out unexpected poetic improvisation ("Take a look what's happening here! / Our goat's decided to shave!") (Note: "Postmotrite, chto tvoritsya! Nash kozel reshil pobritsya!" («Посмотрите, что творится! Наш козел решил побриться!..»)) or appall unwanted guests with street folk songs. Vysotsky remembered these earliest years of his life in the autobiographical song "Ballada detstva" ("Ballad of Childhood").

Vladimir with "Aunt Zhenya" (bottom left). Also in the photo are Aleksey Vysotsky (top left), Semyon Vysotsky (top right), and Aleksey's wife and child (bottom right).

After the outbreak of World War II, Semyon Vysotsky, who had been a reserve officer, was called up for service in the Red Army. In March 1941 he was sent to the front. Nina and Vladimir were evacuated to the village of Vorontsovka in Orenburg Oblast, where the boy had to spend six days a week at kindergarten while his mother worked twelve hours a day in a chemical factory. In 1943, both returned to their flat in Moscow. In September 1945, Vladimir entered the first grade at the 273rd Moscow Rostokino District School.

In December 1946, Vysotsky's parents divorced. From 1947 to 1949, Vladimir lived with Semyon Vladimirovich (then an army Major) and his Armenian wife, Yevgenya Stepanovna Liholatova, whom the boy called "Aunt Zhenya," at a military base in Eberswalde in the Soviet occupation zone in Germany. "We decided that our son would stay with me. Vladimir came to stay with me in January 1947, and my second wife, Yevgenia, became Vladimir's second mother for many years to come. They had much in common and liked each other, which made me really happy," Semyon Vysotsky later remembered. Here the living conditions were much better than at Nina's communal flat in Moscow; the family occupied the whole floor of a two-story house, and for the first time in his life Vladimir had a room to himself. In 1949, Vladimir and his stepmother returned to Moscow. There he joined the fifth grade of the 128th School of Moscow and settled at 15 Bolshoy Karetny, where they had two rooms of a four-room communal flat to themselves. Vysotsky found "Auntie Zhenya," who was just 28 at the time, to be a woman of great kindness and warmth, and later remembered her as being a second mother to him.

In 1953 Vysotsky, by this point very interested in theater and cinema, enrolled in drama courses led by Vladimir Bogomolov. That same year he received his first-ever guitar, as a birthday present from his mother. His close friend Igor Kokhanovsky, who would go on to become a well-known Soviet pop lyricist, taught him basic chords. In 1955 Vladimir moved into his mother's new home at No. 76, 1st Meshchanskaya Street, and in June of that year he graduated from school with five A's.

== Career ==
=== 1955-1963: Beginnings in theatre, cinema, and music ===
In 1955, Vladimir enrolled in the Moscow State University of Civil Engineering, but dropped out after just one year to pursue an acting career. In June 1956 he joined Boris Vershilov's class at the Moscow Art Theatre School. There he met the third-year student Iza Zhukova, who four years later would become his wife. The two soon settled in a common room at the Meschanskaya flat, where their space was sectioned off by a folding screen. It was also at the MAT School that Vysotsky met Bulat Okudzhava, who at this point was already a popular underground bard. He was even more impressed by his Russian literature teacher, Andrey Sinyavsky, who often invited students to his home to stage improvised disputes and concerts.

In 1958, Vysotsky got his first role at the Moscow Art Theatre: that of Porfiry Petrovich in Crime and Punishment.

In 1959 he was cast in his first cinema role, that of the student Petya in Female Age-Mates.

On 20 June 1960, Vysotsky graduated from the MAT School. He soon joined the Moscow Pushkin Drama Theatre, then led by Boris Ravenskikh, where he spent almost three troubled years (with intervals). His time at the theatre was marred by numerous administrative sanctions for "lack of discipline" and occasional drunken sprees, which were primarily a reaction to the lack of serious roles and his inability to realize his artistic potential.

In 1961 and 1962 Vysotsky appeared in the films Dima Gorin's Career and 713 Requests Permission to Land, respectively. Both roles required him to be beaten up on screen, in the first case by Aleksandr Demyanenko. "That was the way cinema greeted me," Vysotsky joked later.

In 1961 Vysotsky also wrote his first proper song, called "Tatuirovka" ("Tattoo"), starting a long and colorful cycle of artfully stylized criminal underworld romantic stories, full of undercurrents and witty social comments.

In 1962 he did a short stint at the Moscow Theater of Miniatures, then directed by Vladimir Polyakov, which ended with his being fired. The official reason given was "for total lack of a sense of humour."

In June 1963, while shooting Penalty Kick (dir. Veniamin Dorman) Vysotsky used the Gorky Film Studio to record an hour-long reel-to-reel tape of his own songs. Copies of it quickly spread, and Vysotsky's name became known in Moscow and elsewhere, though many of the songs were referred to as being either folk music or anonymous. Only several months later, chess grandmaster Mikhail Tal was heard praising the author of "Bolshoy Karetny," and Anna Akhmatova (in conversation with Joseph Brodsky) quoted from Vysotsky's "Ya byl dushoj durnogo obshhestva" ("I Was the Soul of a Bad Company"), apparently taking it for a brilliant piece of anonymous street folklore.

=== 1964–1970: Taganka Theatre, rise to fame, and backlash ===
Vysotsky as Khlopusha in Pugachov.

==== Taganka Theatre and early work ====
In 1964 Vysotsky auditioned at the Taganka Theatre. Yuri Lyubimov, the theatre's director, recalled the audition many years later: "A young man came to my theatre. When I asked him what role he wanted to read for, he answered, 'I've written some songs of my own. Won't you listen?' I agreed to listen to one song […] Our meeting should have lasted at most five minutes. But I ended up listening without interruption for an hour and a half." Vysotsky was invited to join, and on 19 September 1964 he debuted in Bertolt Brecht's The Good Person of Szechwan as the Second God. (Note: He also performed two minor roles in the same play: the husband and Yang Sun.) Later that year he appeared on stage as a dragoon captain (Bela's father) in an adaptation of A Hero of Our Time.

Outside of the theater, in October 1964 Vysotsky recorded 48 of his songs in chronological order, creating his first The Complete Works of... compilation. This boosted his popularity as a new Moscow folk underground star.

It was at Taganka Theatre that Vysotsky first started to sing on stage. In January 1965 he appeared in the avant-garde production The Poet and the Theater, (Note: Better-known by its later name, Antiworlds.) which combined the poetry of Andrey Voznesensky with sketches and music, and received his first-ever songwriting credit for his contributions. That same month he also appeared in Ten Days That Shook the World, again contributing music and lyrics. In April 1965 Vysotsky also debuted as a solo musical performer, holding two live concerts at the Leningrad Nuclear Physics Institute. He then wrote multiple songs for, and appeared in, Yuri Lyubimov's World War II play The Fallen and the Living, which premiered at Taganka Theatre in October 1965. Vysotsky's musical contributions included "Zvezdy" ("Stars"), "Soldaty gruppy Tsentr" ("Center Group Soldiers"), and "Shtrafniye batalyony" ("Penal Battalions"), all striking examples of a completely new kind of war song.

On 17 May 1966 Vysotsky appeared in his first leading theater role, Galileo in Lyubimov's production of Life of Galileo. The role required Vysotsky to perform numerous acrobatic tricks on stage. Press reaction was mixed, with some reviewers stating they disliked Vysotsky's overt emotionalism, but for the first time his name appeared in Soviet papers.

Around this time Vysotsky also landed his first "serious" (neither comical nor villainous) film role, appearing as Volodya in Viktor Turov's I Come From Childhood (1966). The film featured two of his songs, "Holoda" ("The Cold" (Note: lit. "Colds" (in the sense of climate, not illness).)) and "Bratskie mogily" ("Mass Graves"), the latter sung for the film by Mark Bernes.

==== Breakthrough role and rise to fame ====
Vysotsky's major breakthrough came with his starring role in the mountain climbing drama Vertical (1967), which prominently featured his songs. Mostly written during filming on Mount Elbrus, these included "Pesnya o druge" ("Song About a Friend") and "Voyennaya pesnya" ("War Song"). Due to widely-circulated amateur recordings of his live performances, the songs were already widely known by the time the film premiered. When the film was released, Vysotsky skyrocketed to fame. In January of 1968, thanks to the efforts of producer Anna Kachalina (Chief Variety Editor for the record label Melodiya) and permission from the head of Melodiya, music from the film was released on vinyl. The initial pressing sold out immediately, and record stores placed further orders directly to record factories without Melodiya's authorization.

In 1967 Vysotsky also starred in Kira Muratova's Brief Encounters, which featured another off-the-cuff musical piece, this time the melancholy "Dela" ("Things to Do"). Vysotsky also continued his work at Taganka Theatre, taking the role of Mayakovsky in the experimental play Listen! and holding regular semi-official concerts where audiences greeted him as a cult hero.

At the end of 1967 Vysotsky landed another pivotal theater role, that of Khlopusha in Pugachev, based on Sergei Yesenin's poem Land of Scoundrels. The play is often described as one of Taganka's finest. Several weeks after the premiere, infuriated by the actor's increasing unreliability due to worsening drinking problems, Lyubimov fired him—only to invite him back several months later. This began a cycle of Vysotsky being sacked and then pardoned which would continue for years.

Marina Vlady, describing Vysotsky's popularity during this period, recalled going for a walk on a summer night and hearing his distinctive singing voice from literally every open window.

At least four of Vysotsky's 1968 songs, "Spasitye nashi dushi" ("Save Our Souls"), "Ohota na volkov" ("The Wolfhunt"), "Variatszyi na tsiganskiye temy" ("Gypsy Variations"), and "Ban'ka po belomu" ("Steam-bath in White") were later hailed as masterpieces.

==== Official backlash ====
In June 1968 a smear campaign was launched against Vysotsky in the Soviet press. First, Sovetskaya Rossiya commented on the "epidemic spread of immoral, smutty songs," allegedly promoting "criminal world values, alcoholism, vice and immorality," and condemned their author for "sowing seeds of evil." Then Komsomolskaya Pravda linked Vysotsky with black market dealers selling his tapes in Siberia. Composer Dmitry Kabalevsky, speaking at a conference of the Union of Soviet Composers, criticized Soviet radio for giving an ideologically dubious, "low-life product" like "Song for a Friend" unwarranted airplay. Playwright Alexander Stein, who had used several of Vysotsky's songs in his play Last Parade, was chastised by a Ministry of Culture official for "providing a platform for this anti-Soviet scum." The phraseology prompted commentators in the West to draw parallels between Vysotsky and Mikhail Zoschenko, another Soviet author who had been officially labeled "scum" some 20 years prior.

Two of Vysotsky's 1968 films, Gennadi Poloka's Intervention (in which he was cast as a dodgy if highly artistic character) and Yevgeny Karelov's Two Comrades Were Serving (in which he played a gun-toting White Army officer who in the course of the film shoots his friend, his horse, the protagonist, and, finally, himself) were severely censored, the former shelved for almost twenty years.

In 1969 Vysotsky starred in two films: Master of the Taiga, where he played a villainous, timber-floating Siberian labour-brigade foreman, and Georgi Yungvald-Khilkevich's Dangerous Tour. The latter was criticized in the Soviet press for taking a farcical approach to the subject of the Bolshevik underground activities, though it was well-received by the broader Soviet audience.

=== 1971–1973 ===
In 1971 a drinking spree-related nervous breakdown sent Vysotsky to the Moscow Kashchenko clinic. Many of his songs from this period deal with alcoholism and insanity. After a partial recovery (owed largely to the supportive presence of Marina Vlady) Vysotsky embarked on a successful Ukrainian concert tour, and wrote a cluster of new songs.

On 29 November 1971 Lyubimov's version of Hamlet premiered at Taganka Theatre, a groundbreaking production with Vysotsky in the leading role—in this incarnation a lone intellectual rebel, rising to fight the cruel state machine.

Also in 1971 Vysotsky was invited to play the lead in The Sannikov Land, the screen adaptation of Vladimir Obruchev's science fiction novel. He wrote several songs for it, but was dropped at the behest of the general director of Mosfilm, Nikolai Sizov, ostensibly for being too recognizable as a popular figure. One of the songs written for the film, the doom-laden epic allegory "Koni priveredlivye" ("Picky Horses") became one of Vysotsky's signature tunes.

In 1972 Vysotsky starred in The Fourth. He also appeared on Soviet Estonian TV (Eesti Televisioon) for an episode entitled "Noormees Tagankalt" (Young Man from Taganka), in which he performed his songs and gave an interview.

Songs written by Vysotsky in 1972 included "Pevetz u mikrofona" ("Singer at the Microphone"), "Kanatohodetz" ("The Tightrope Walker"), "My vrashaem zemlyu" ("We Turn the Earth"), "Cherniye bushlaty" ("Black Pea-Coats"), "Beda" ("Disaster"), "Zhertva televidinya" ("Victim of Television"), "Chest' shashmatnoj korony" ("Honor of the Chess Crown"), and "Mishka Shifman."

In April 1973 Vysotsky visited Poland and France. Difficulties with getting travel permits were resolved after French Communist Party leader Georges Marchais made a personal phone call to Leonid Brezhnev, who, according to Marina Vlady's memoirs, rather sympathized with the celebrity couple. Upon their return, Vysotsky discovered that a lawsuit had been brought against him regarding unsanctioned concerts in Siberia the year before. In response, he wrote a defiant letter to the Minister of Culture, Pyotr Demichev. As a result, he was granted the status of a philharmonic artist, guaranteed a payment of 11.5 roubles per concert. Nonetheless, the court found that Vysotsky had to pay a fine of 900 rubles (a substantial sum, given that his monthly salary at Taganka Theatre was 110 rubles).

In 1973 Vysotsky also starred alongside Oleg Dahl in Bad Good Man, playing the role of von Koren. His performance earned him the award of "Best Actor in a Male Role" at the 5th Festival of Nations competition at the Taormina Film Fest in Italy.

That same year Vysotsky wrote some thirty songs for Alice in Wonderland, an audio play in which he also voiced several minor roles. His best-known songs from 1973 include "Chuzhaya koleya" ("Someone Else's Rut"), "Prervannyj polet" ("Interrupted Flight"), and "Pamyatnik" ("Monument").

=== 1974–1977 ===
In 1974 Melodiya released a 7-inch EP featuring four of Vysotsky's war songs: "On ne vernulsya iz boya" ("He Didn't Return From Battle"), "Pesnya o novom vremeni" ("Song About New Times" (Note: lit. '"Song About a New Time"')), "Bratskiye mogily" ("Mass Graves"), and "Pesnya o zemle" ("Song About the Earth"). This represented only a tiny portion of his creative work, by this point owned by millions on tape.

In September 1974 Vysotsky received his first state award, an Honorary Diploma of the Uzbek SSR, following a tour of the Taganka Theatre in Uzbekistan. Also in 1974 he filmed in The Only Road, a joint venture between Mosfilm and the Yugoslav Filmski Studio.

In 1975 Vysotsky was granted membership in the Cinematographers Union of the USSR. This meant he was no longer "anti-Soviet scum," but rather an unlikely link between the state-sanctioned Soviet cinema elite and the "progressive-thinking artists of the West." More films followed, among them the science fiction movie The Flight of Mr. McKinley (1975). Of the nine ballads he wrote for the film, only two made it into the soundtrack.

This period was the height of Vysotsky's popularity. Songs he wrote at the time included "Instruktziya pered poyezdkoj zarubezh" ("Instructions Before a Trip Abroad") and "Pesnya o pogibshem letchike" ("Song About a Fallen Pilot").

Also in 1975 Vysotsky made his third trip to France, where he took the risk of visiting his former tutor, Andrey Sinyavsky, by then a celebrated dissident émigré. Vysotsky also became friends with the Paris-based artist Mikhail Shemyakin, with whom he would often drink. Shemyakin recorded Vysotsky in his home studio. Subsequently, after a brief stay in England, Vysotsky traveled to Mexico and in April performed his first concerts there.

During this time there were changes at Taganka Theatre. Lyubimov took a contract job with La Scala in Milan, and was replaced by Anatoly Efros, who had a radically different directorial approach. Efros put on The Cherry Orchard, which premiered on 30 June 1975 and starred Alla Demidova (as Ranevskaya) and Vysotsky (as Lopakhin). The play caused a sensation, with critics praising the powerful interplay between Demidova and Vysotsky. Lyubimov, who disliked the piece, accused Efros of giving his actors "stardom malaise."

In 1976, the Taganka Theatre made a visit to Bulgaria, where Vysotsky filmed an interview and recorded 15 songs for the Balkanton record label. When the troupe returned to Moscow, Lyubimov (by then back from Milan) declared himself unable to work with Vysotsky any longer and gave the role of Hamlet to Valery Zolotukhin, Vysotsky's best friend. Reportedly, this was when the stressed-out Vysotsky started taking amphetamines.

Songs written by Vysotsky in 1976 included "Kupola" ("Cupolas") and "Ballada o Lyubvi" ("Ballad of Love").

After another trip to Belorussia, Vysotsky and Vlady traveled to France and from there to North America, without requesting or receiving official permission to leave the Soviet Union.

In North America Vysotsky stopped in New York City, where he met Mikhail Baryshnikov and Joseph Brodsky. He also recorded a segment for 60 Minutes with Dan Rather, which aired on 20 February 1977. The program incorrectly stated he had served time in a labor camp and presented him as a dissident, though Vysotsky stressed during his interview that he loved his country and did not want to do it any harm. The unauthorized venture bore no repercussions at home, as by this time Soviet authorities were divided on Vysotsky up to the highest level: while Mikhail Suslov detested the bard, Brezhnev loved his work so much that when Brezhnev was in the hospital he asked Vysotsky to perform at the home of his daughter Galina so that he could listen over the telephone.

During this trip Vysotsky also visited Canada, where he recorded an LP with RCA Victor, backed by an orchestra. The resulting record was released in Paris in 1977 under the title Vladimir Vissotsky and contained eleven songs.

In September 1976 Vysotsky accompanied the rest of the Taganka Theatre troupe to Yugoslavia, where Hamlet won first prize at the annual BITEF festival. He then traveled to Hungary for a two-week concert tour. Once back in Moscow, he played the modest role of Ivan Bezdomny in Lyubimov's production of The Master and Margarita, and the more major role of Svidrigailov in Yury Karyakin's take on Dostoevsky's Crime and Punishment.

Vysotsky's new songs during this time included "Istoriya Bolezni" ("History of Illness"), which concerned his health problems, the humorous "Pochemu Aborigeny Syeli Kooka" ("Why Did the Aborigines Eat Captain Cook"), "Ballada o Pravda i Lzhi" ("Ballad of Truth and Lies"), and "Dve Sud'by" ("Two Fates"), a chilling story of a self-absorbed alcoholic hunted by two malevolent witches.

In 1977 Vysotsky's health deteriorated to such an extent that in April he found himself in a Moscow clinic's reanimation center in a state of physical and mental collapse. He suffered heart, kidney, and liver failures, a jaw infection, and a nervous breakdown.

=== 1977–1980 ===
In 1977 three of Vysotsky's LPs were released in France, including the one he recorded with RCA during his trip to Canada in the previous year. Arranged and accompanied by guitarist Kostya Kazansky, this was the first time Vysotsky enjoyed a relatively sophisticated musical backing.

In August 1977 Vysotsky performed in Hollywood for the film crew of New York, New York (1977), and, according to Vlady, was greeted warmly by actors including Liza Minnelli and Robert De Niro. Further concerts in Los Angeles were followed by an appearance at an annual event held by the French Communist paper L’Humanité.

In December 1977 the Taganka Theatre troupe traveled to France to perform Hamlet, with Vysotsky back in the lead. The play received positive reviews.

External videos
- The Meeting Place Cannot Be Changed film clip. Sharapov (Vladimir Konkin) is furious with Zheglov (Vysotsky) for planting a purse on a thief in order to extort him for information on a worse criminal. Zheglov retorts, "If [he]'s a thief, he belongs behind bars. Nobody cares how I put him there. A thief belongs in prison!"

In March–April of 1978 Vysotsky did a series of concerts in Moscow and Ukraine. Subsequently, in May 1978 Vysotsky began filming in The Meeting Place Cannot Be Changed, a five-part television film about two detectives pursuing a criminal gang in 1945 Moscow. Vysotsky starred as Gleb Zheglov, a ruthless and charismatic cop mentoring his milder and more rule-abiding partner Vladimir Sharapov (played by Vladimir Konkin). The film premiered on 11 November 1978 on Soviet Central TV.

During this time Vysotsky also became involved in Taganka Theatre's Genre-seeking show (performing some of his own songs) and played Aleksander Blok in Anatoly Efros' Neznakomka (The Lady Stranger) radio play, which premiered on 10 July 1979 and later released as a double LP.

In November 1978 Vysotsky took part in the underground censorship-defying literary project Metropol', inspired and organized by Vasily Aksenov. In January 1979 Vysotsky again visited America with highly successful series of concerts. That was the point (according to biographer Vladimir Novikov) when a glimpse of new, clean life of a respectable international actor and performer almost led Vysotsky seriously reconsider his priorities. What followed, though, was a return to the self-destructive theater and concert tours schedule, personal doctor Anatoly Fedotov now not only his companion, but part of Taganka's crew. "Who was this Anatoly? Just a man who in every possible situation would try to provide drugs. And he did provide. In such moments Volodya trusted him totally," Oksana Afanasyeva, Vysotsky's Moscow girlfriend (who was near him for most of the last year of his life and, on occasion, herself served as a drug courier) remembered. In July 1979, after a series of Central Asia concerts, Vysotsky collapsed, experienced clinical death and was resuscitated by Fedotov (who injected caffeine into the heart directly), colleague and close friend Vsevolod Abdulov helping with heart massage. In January 1980 Vysotsky asked Lyubimov for a year's leave. "Up to you, but on condition that Hamlet is yours," was the answer. The songwriting showed signs of slowing down, as Vysotsky began switching from songs to more conventional poetry. Still, of nearly 800 poems by Vysotsky only one has been published in the Soviet Union while he was alive. Not a single performance or interview was broadcast by the Soviet television in his lifetime.

In May 1979, being in a practice studio of the MSU Faculty of Journalism, Vysotsky recorded a video letter to American actor and film producer Warren Beatty, looking for both a personal meeting with Beatty and an opportunity to get a role in the film Reds, to be produced and directed by the latter. While recording, Vysotsky made a few attempts to speak English, trying to overcome the language barrier. This video letter never reached Beatty. It was broadcast for the first time more than three decades later, on the night of 24 January 2013 (local time) by Rossiya 1 channel, along with records of TV channels of Italy, Mexico, Poland, USA and from private collections, in the film Vladimir Vysotsky. A letter to Warren Beatty film by Alexander Kovanovsky and Igor Rakhmanov. While recording this video, Vysotsky had a rare opportunity to perform for a camera, being still unable to do it with Soviet television.

On 22 January 1980, Vysotsky entered the Moscow Ostankino Technical Center to record his one and only studio concert for the Soviet television. What proved to be an exhausting affair (his concentration lacking, he had to plod through several takes for each song) was premiered on the Soviet TV eight years later. The last six months of his life saw Vysotsky appearing on stage sporadically, fueled by heavy dosages of drugs and alcohol. His performances were often erratic. Occasionally Vysotsky paid visits to Sklifosofsky institute's ER unit, but would not hear of Marina Vlady's suggestions for him to take a long-term rehabilitation course in a Western clinic. Yet he kept writing, mostly poetry and even prose, but songs as well. The last song he performed was the agonizing "My Sorrow, My Anguish" and his final poem, written one week prior to his death was "A Letter to Marina": "I'm less than fifty, but the time is short / By you and God protected, life and limb / I have a song or two to sing before the Lord / I have a way to make my peace with him."

== Death ==
Although several theories of the ultimate cause of the singer's death persist to this day, given what is now known about cardiovascular disease, it seems likely that by the time of his death Vysotsky had an advanced coronary condition brought about by years of tobacco, alcohol and drug abuse, as well as his grueling work schedule and the stress of the constant harassment by the government. Towards the end, most of Vysotsky's closest friends had become aware of the ominous signs and were convinced that his demise was only a matter of time. Clear evidence of this can be seen in a video ostensibly shot by the Japanese NHK channel only months before Vysotsky's death, where he appears visibly unwell, breathing heavily and slurring his speech. Accounts by Vysotsky's close friends and colleagues concerning his last hours were compiled in the book by V. Perevozchikov.

Vysotsky suffered from alcoholism for most of his life. Sometime around 1977, he started using amphetamines and other prescription narcotics in an attempt to counteract the debilitating hangovers and eventually to rid himself of alcohol addiction. While these attempts were partially successful, he ended up trading alcoholism for a severe drug dependency that was fast spiralling out of control. He was reduced to begging some of his close friends in the medical profession for supplies of drugs, often using his acting skills to collapse in a medical office and imitate a seizure or some other condition requiring a painkiller injection. On 25 July 1979 (a year to the day before his death) he suffered a cardiac arrest and was clinically dead for several minutes during a concert tour of Soviet Uzbekistan, after injecting himself with a wrong kind of painkiller he had previously obtained from a dentist's office.

Fully aware of the dangers of his condition, Vysotsky made several attempts to cure himself of his addiction. He underwent an experimental (and ultimately discredited) blood purification procedure offered by a leading drug rehabilitation specialist in Moscow. He also went to an isolated retreat in France with his wife Marina in the spring of 1980 as a way of forcefully depriving himself of any access to drugs. After these attempts failed, Vysotsky returned to Moscow to find his life in an increasingly stressful state of disarray. He had been a defendant in two criminal trials, one for a car wreck he had caused some months earlier, and one for an alleged conspiracy to sell unauthorized concert tickets (he eventually received a suspended sentence and probation in the first case, and the charges in the second were dismissed, although several of his co-defendants were found guilty). He also unsuccessfully fought the film studio authorities for the rights to direct a movie called The Green Phaeton. Relations with his wife Marina were deteriorating, and he was torn between his loyalty to her and his love for his mistress Oksana Afanasyeva. He had also developed severe inflammation in one of his legs, making his concert performances extremely challenging.

In a final desperate attempt to overcome his drug addiction, partially prompted by his inability to obtain drugs through his usual channels (the authorities had imposed a strict monitoring of the medical institutions to prevent illicit drug distribution during the 1980 Olympics), he relapsed into alcohol and went on a prolonged drinking binge (apparently consuming copious amounts of champagne due to a prevalent misconception at the time that it was better than vodka at countering the effects of drug withdrawal).

On 3 July 1980, Vysotsky gave a performance at a suburban Moscow concert hall. One of the stage managers recalls that he looked visibly unhealthy ("gray-faced", as she puts it) and complained of not feeling too good, while another says she was surprised by his request for champagne before the start of the show, as he had always been known for completely abstaining from drink before his concerts. On 16 July Vysotsky gave his last public concert in Kaliningrad. On 18 July, Vysotsky played Hamlet for the last time at the Taganka Theatre. From around 21 July, several of his close friends were on a round-the-clock watch at his apartment, carefully monitoring his alcohol intake and hoping against all odds that his drug dependency would soon be overcome and they would then be able to bring him back from the brink. The effects of drug withdrawal were clearly getting the better of him, as he got increasingly restless, moaned and screamed in pain, and at times fell into memory lapses, failing to recognize at first some of his visitors, including his son Arkady. At one point, Vysotsky's personal physician A. Fedotov (the same doctor who had brought him back from clinical death a year earlier in Uzbekistan) attempted to sedate him, inadvertently causing asphyxiation from which he was barely saved. On 24 July, Vysotsky told his mother that he thought he was going to die that day, and then made similar remarks to a few of the friends present at the apartment, who begged him to stop such talk and keep his spirits up. But soon thereafter, Oksana Afanasyeva saw him clench his chest several times, which led her to suspect that he was genuinely suffering from a cardiovascular condition. She informed Fedotov of this but was told not to worry, as he was going to monitor Vysotsky's condition all night. In the evening, after drinking relatively small amounts of alcohol, the moaning and groaning Vysotsky was sedated by Fedotov, who then sat down on the couch next to him but fell asleep. Fedotov awoke in the early hours of 25 July to an unusual silence and found Vysotsky dead in his bed with his eyes wide open, apparently of a myocardial infarction, as he later certified. This was contradicted by Fedotov's colleagues, Sklifosovsky Emergency Medical Institute physicians L. Sul'povar and S. Scherbakov (who had demanded the actor's immediate hospitalization on 23 July but were allegedly rebuffed by Fedotov), who insisted that Fedotov's incompetent sedation combined with alcohol was what killed Vysotsky. An autopsy was prevented by Vysotsky's parents (who were eager to have their son's drug addiction remain secret), so the true cause of death remains unknown.

No official announcement of the actor's death was made, only a brief obituary appeared in the Moscow newspaper Vechernyaya Moskva, and a note informing of Vysotsky's death and cancellation of the Hamlet performance was put out at the entrance to the Taganka Theatre (the story goes that not a single ticket holder took advantage of the refund offer). Despite this, by the end of the day, millions had learned of Vysotsky's death. On 28 July, he lay in state at the Taganka Theatre. After a mourning ceremony involving an unauthorized mass gathering of unprecedented scale, Vysotsky was buried at the Vagankovskoye Cemetery in Moscow. The attendance at the Olympic events dropped noticeably on that day, as scores of spectators left to attend the funeral. Tens of thousands of people lined the streets to catch a glimpse of his coffin.

=== Controversy surrounding circumstances of death ===
According to author Valery Perevozchikov, part of the blame for his death lay with the group of associates who surrounded him in the last years of his life. This inner circle was all people under the influence of his strong character, combined with a material interest in the large sums of money his concerts earned. This list included Valerii Yankelovich, manager of the Taganka Theatre and prime organiser of his non-sanctioned concerts; Anatoly Fedotov, his personal doctor; Vadim Tumanov, gold prospector (and personal friend) from Siberia; Oksana Afanasyeva (later Yarmolnik), his mistress the last three years of his life; Ivan Bortnik, a fellow actor; and Leonid Sul'povar, a department head at the Sklifosovski hospital who was responsible for much of the supply of drugs.

Vysotsky's associates had all put in efforts to supply his drug habit, which kept him going in the last years of his life. Under their influence, he was able to continue to perform all over the country, up to a week before his death. Due to illegal (i.e. non-state-sanctioned) sales of tickets and other underground methods, these concerts pulled in sums of money unimaginable in Soviet times, when almost everyone received nearly the same small salary.

Some money went to Vysotsky, the rest was distributed amongst this circle. At first this was a reasonable return on their efforts; however, as his addiction progressed and his body developed resistance, the frequency and amount of drugs needed to keep Vysotsky going became unmanageable. This culminated at the time of the Moscow Olympics which coincided with the last days of his life, when supplies of drugs were monitored more strictly than usual, and some of the doctors involved in supplying Vysotsky were already behind bars (normally the doctors had to account for every ampule, thus drugs were transferred to an empty container, while the patients received a substitute or placebo instead). In the last few days Vysotsky became uncontrollable, his shouting could be heard all over the apartment building on Malaya Gruzinskaya Street where he lived amongst VIPs. Several days before his death, in a state of stupor he went on a high-speed drive around Moscow in an attempt to obtain drugs and alcohol – when many high-ranking people saw him. This increased the likelihood of him being forcibly admitted to the hospital, and the consequent danger to the circle supplying his habit. As his state of health declined, and it became obvious that he might die, his associates gathered to decide what to do with him. They came up with no firm decision. They did not want him admitted officially, as his drug addiction would become public and they would fall under suspicion, although some of them admitted that any ordinary person in his condition would have been admitted immediately.

On Vysotsky's death his associates and relatives put in much effort to prevent a post-mortem being carried out. This was despite the fairly unusual circumstances: he died aged 42 under heavy sedation with an improvised cocktail of sedatives and stimulants, including the toxic chloral hydrate, provided by his personal doctor who had been supplying him with narcotics the previous three years. This doctor, being the only one present at his side when death occurred, had a few days earlier been seen to display elementary negligence in treating the sedated Vysotsky. On the night of his death, Arkady Vysotsky (his son), who tried to visit his father in his apartment, was rudely refused entry by Yankelovich, even though there was a lack of people able to care for him. Subsequently, the Soviet police commenced a manslaughter investigation which was dropped due to the absence of evidence taken at the time of death.

== Personal life ==
=== Relationships ===
==== Iza Zhukova ====
Vysotsky's first wife was Iza Zhukova. They met in 1956 as fellow students at the MAT theater institute and lived for some time at Vysotsky's mother's flat in Moscow. After her graduation (Iza was 2 years older) they spent months in different cities (she in Kiev, then Rostov) and finally married on 25 April 1960.

==== Lyudmila Abramova ====
Vysotsky met Lyudmila Abramova in September 1961, while they were both filming 713 Requests Permission to Land in Leningrad. Abramova was still a student at Gerasimov Institute of Cinematography, while Vysotsky was then with the Moscow Pushkin Drama Theatre.

They married in 1965 and had two sons, Arkady (born 1962) and Nikita (born 1964). Their relationship ended when she realized that Vysotsky had been cheating on her.

In an interview in 2018, Abramova said that she was largely happy while they were together, even if there were occasional bad times.

==== Tatyana Ivanenko ====
While still married to Lyudmila Abramova, Vysotsky began a romantic relationship with Tatyana Ivanenko, a Taganka actress.

==== Marina Vlady ====
In 1967 Vysotsky fell in love with Marina Vlady, a French actress of Russian descent, who was working at Mosfilm on a joint Soviet-French production at that time. As a result, 1968 marked the point when "proper" love songs started to appear in his repertoire, documenting the beginning of their love affair.

After his visit with Khrushchev in 1969, Vysotsky took Marina Vlady to director Victor Turov's place to investigate her Belarusian roots. They subsequently married on 1 December 1970, causing a furor among Moscow's cultural and political elite. They spent their honeymoon in Georgia, during which time Vysotsky wrote numerous new songs, including "Ya Ne Lyublyu" ("I Don't Like" (Note: lit. "I Don't Love.")).

For 10 years the two maintained a long-distance relationship as Marina compromised her career in France to spend more time in Moscow, and Vladimir's friends pulled strings for him to be allowed to travel abroad to stay with his wife. Marina eventually joined the Communist Party of France, which essentially gave her an unlimited-entry visa into the Soviet Union, and provided Vladimir with some immunity against prosecution by the government, which was becoming weary of his covertly anti-Soviet lyrics and his odds-defying popularity with the masses. The problems of his long-distance relationship with Vlady inspired several of Vysotsky's songs.

== Legacy and remembrance ==
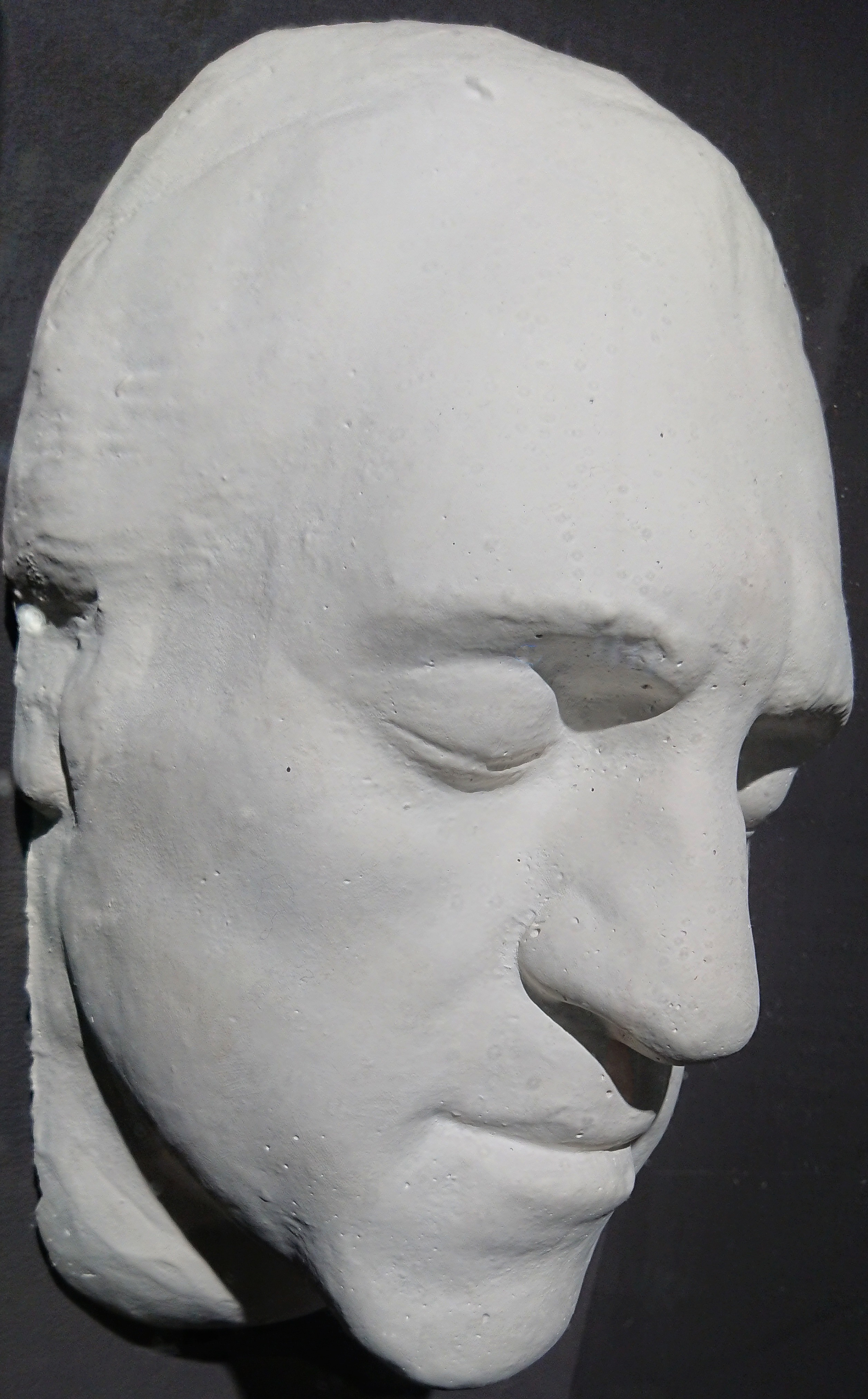
Vysotsky's death mask

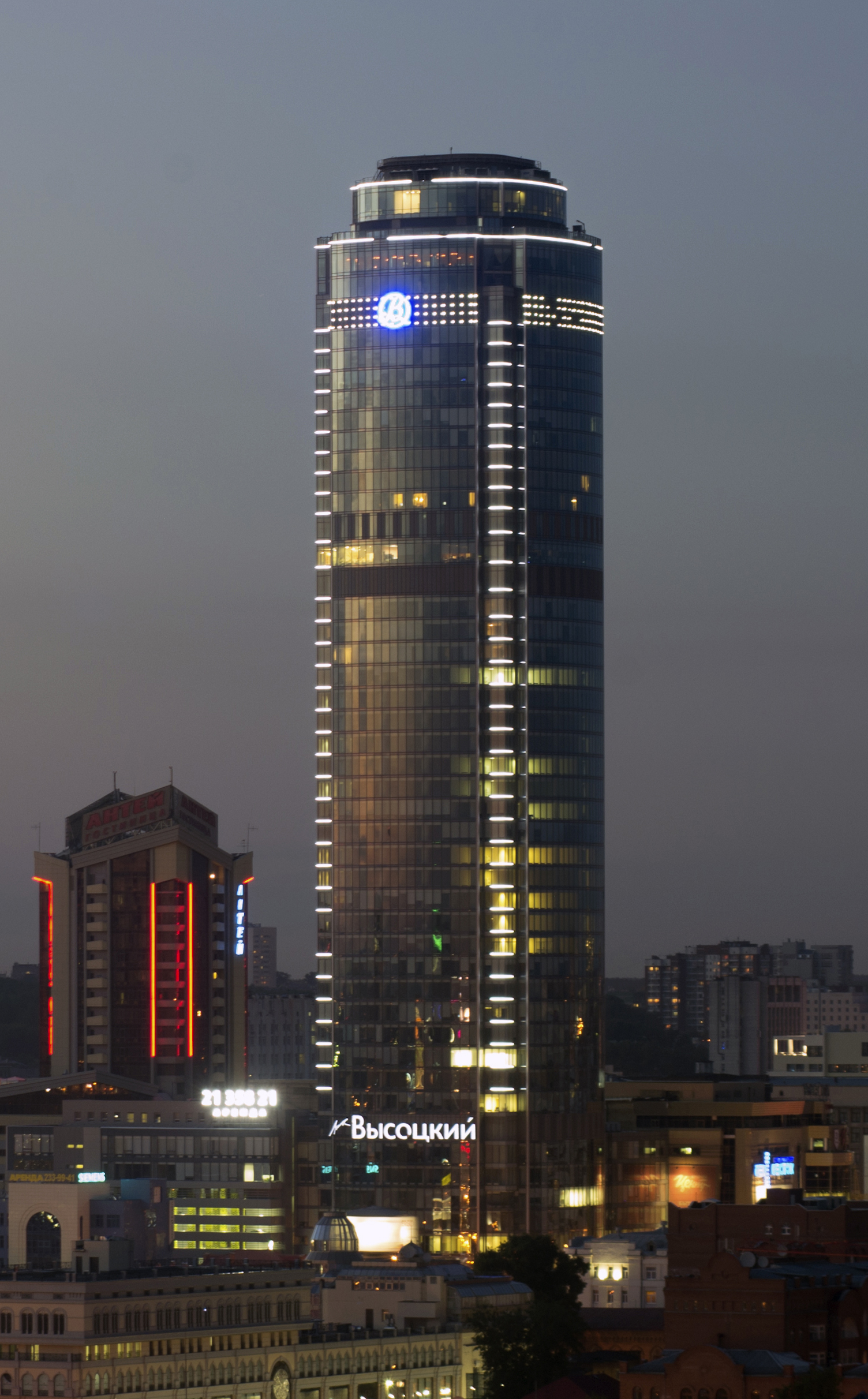
Vysotsky skyscraper in Yekaterinburg.

In the autumn of 1981 Vysotsky's first collection of poetry was officially published in the USSR, called The Nerve (Нерв). Its first edition (25,000 copies) was sold out instantly. In 1982 the second one followed (100,000), then the third (1988, 200,000), followed in the 1990s by several more. The material for it was compiled by Robert Rozhdestvensky, an officially laurelled Soviet poet. Also in 1981 Yuri Lyubimov staged at Taganka a new music and poetry production called Vladimir Vysotsky which was promptly banned and officially premiered on 25 January 1989.

In 1982 the motion picture The Ballad of the Valiant Knight Ivanhoe was produced in the Soviet Union and in 1983 the movie was released to the public. Four songs by Vysotsky were featured in the film.

In 1986 the official Vysotsky poetic heritage committee was formed (with Robert Rozhdestvensky at the helm, theater critic Natalya Krymova being both the instigator and the organizer). Despite some opposition from the conservatives (Yegor Ligachev was the latter's political leader, Stanislav Kunyaev of Nash Sovremennik represented its literary flank) Vysotsky was rewarded posthumously with the USSR State Prize. The official formula – "for creating the character of Zheglov and artistic achievements as a singer-songwriter" was much derided from both the left and the right. In 1988 the Selected Works of... (edited by N. Krymova) compilation was published, preceded by I Will Surely Return... (Я, конечно, вернусь...) book of fellow actors' memoirs and Vysotsky's verses, some published for the first time. In 1990 two volumes of extensive The Works of... were published, financed by the late poet's father Semyon Vysotsky. Even more ambitious publication series, self-proclaimed "the first ever academic edition" (the latter assertion being dismissed by sceptics) compiled and edited by Sergey Zhiltsov, were published in Tula (1994–1998, 5 volumes), Germany (1994, 7 volumes) and Moscow (1997, 4 volumes).

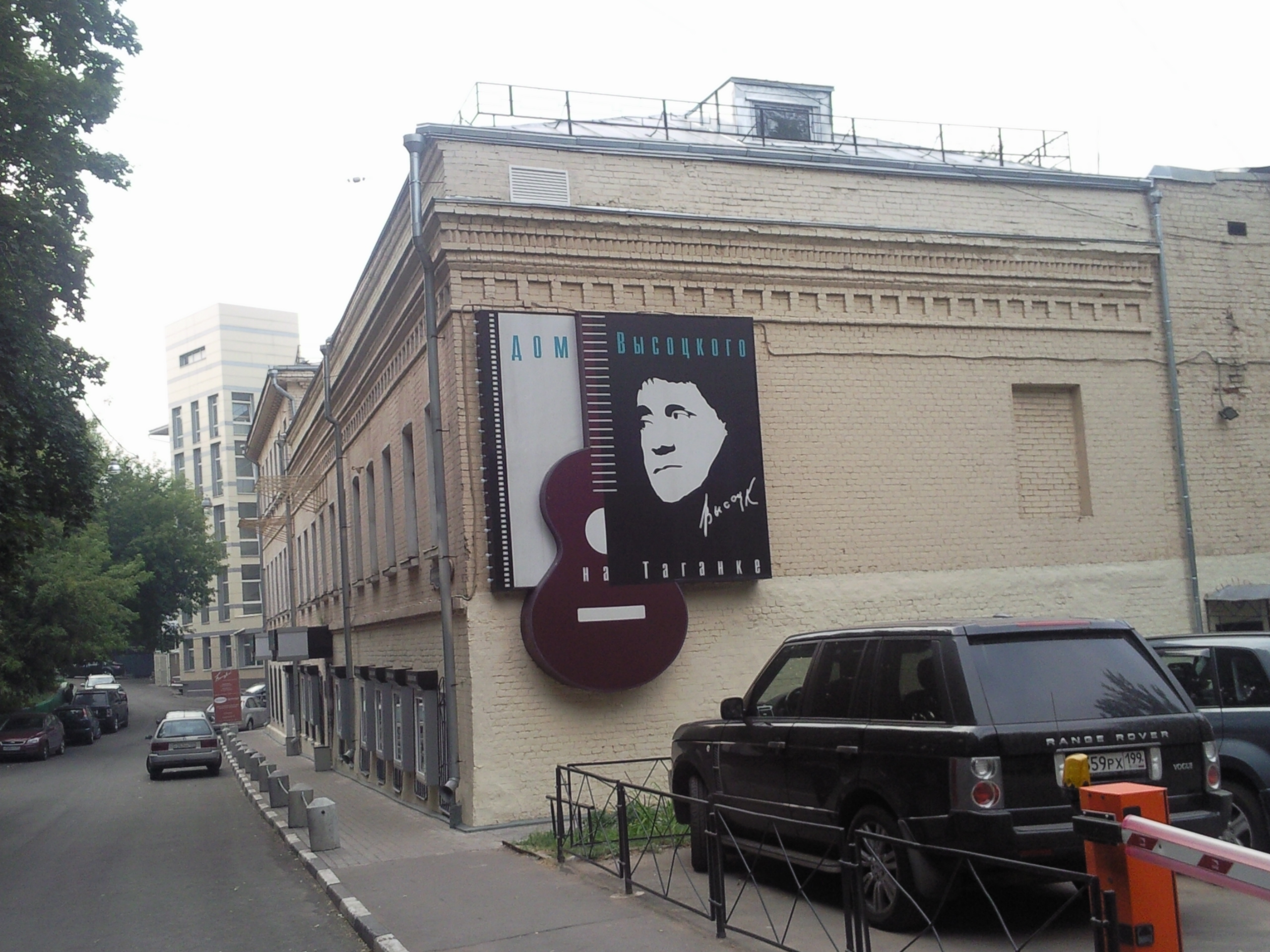
The Vysotsky Museum in Moscow

In 1989 the official Vysotsky Museum opened in Moscow, with the magazine of its own called Vagant (edited by Sergey Zaitsev) devoted entirely to Vysotsky's legacy. In 1996 it became an independent publication and was closed in 2002.

In the years to come, Vysotsky's grave became a site of pilgrimage for several generations of his fans, the youngest of whom were born after his death. His tombstone also became the subject of controversy, as his widow had wished for a simple abstract slab, while his parents insisted on a realistic gilded statue. Although probably too solemn to have inspired Vysotsky himself, the statue is believed by some to be full of metaphors and symbols reminiscent of the singer's life. In 1995 in Moscow the Vysotsky monument was officially opened at Strastnoy Boulevard, by the Petrovsky Gates. Among those present were the bard's parents, two of his sons, first wife Iza, renowned poets Yevtushenko and Voznesensky. Mayor of Moscow Yuri Luzhkov remarked during his speech, "Vysotsky had always been telling the truth. Only once he was wrong when he sang in one of his songs: 'They will never erect me a monument in a square like that by Petrovskiye Vorota.'" A further monument to Vysotsky was erected in 2014 at Rostov-on-Don.

In October 2004, a monument to Vysotsky was erected in the Montenegrin capital of Podgorica, near the Millennium Bridge. His son, Nikita Vysotsky, attended the unveiling. The statue was designed by Russian sculptor Alexander Taratinov, who also designed a monument to Alexander Pushkin in Podgorica. The bronze statue shows Vysotsky standing on a pedestal, with his one hand raised and the other holding a guitar. Next to the figure lies a bronze skull – a reference to Vysotsky's monumental lead performances in Shakespeare's Hamlet. On the pedestal the last lines from a poem of Vysotsky's, dedicated to Montenegro, are carved.

The Vysotsky Business Center and skyscraper was officially opened in Yekaterinburg, in 2011. It is the tallest building in Russia outside of Moscow, has 54 floors, total height: 188.3 m (618 ft). On the third floor of the business center is the Vysotsky Museum. Behind the building is a bronze sculpture of Vladimir Vysotsky and his third wife, French actress Marina Vlady.

In 2011 a controversial movie Vysotsky. Thank You For Being Alive was released, with a script written by his son, Nikita Vysotsky. The actor Sergey Bezrukov portrayed Vysotsky, using a combination of a mask and CGI effects. The film tells about Vysotsky's illegal underground performances, problems with the KGB and drugs, and subsequent clinical death in 1979.

Shortly after Vysotsky's death, many Russian bards started writing songs and poems about his life and death. The best known are Yuri Vizbor's "Letter to Vysotsky" (1982) and Bulat Okudzhava's "About Volodya Vysotsky" (1980). In Poland, Jacek Kaczmarski based some of his songs on those of Vysotsky, such as his first song (1977) was based on "The Wolfhunt", and dedicated to his memory the song "Epitafium dla Włodzimierza Wysockiego" ("Epitaph for Vladimir Vysotsky").

Every year on Vysotsky's birthday festivals are held throughout Russia and in many communities throughout the world, especially in Europe. Vysotsky's impact in Russia is often compared to that of Wolf Biermann in Germany, Bob Dylan in America, or Georges Brassens and Jacques Brel in France.

The asteroid 2374 Vladvysotskij, discovered by Lyudmila Zhuravleva, was named after Vysotsky.

During the Annual Q&A Event Direct Line with Vladimir Putin, Alexey Venediktov asked Putin to name a street in Moscow after the singer Vladimir Vysotsky, who, though considered one of the greatest Russian artists, has no street named after him in Moscow almost 30 years after his death. Venediktov stated a Russian law that allowed the President to do so and propose legislation to name a street by decree. Putin answered that he would talk to Mayor of Moscow and would solve this problem. In July 2015 former Upper and Lower Tagansky Dead-ends (Верхний и Нижний Таганские тупики) in Moscow were reorganized into Vladimir Vysotsky Street.

The Sata Kieli Cultural Association of Finland organizes the annual International Vladimir Vysotsky Festival (Vysotski Fest), where Vysotsky's singers from different countries perform in Helsinki and other Finnish cities. They sing Vysotsky in different languages and in different arrangements.

Two brothers and singers from Finland, Mika and Turkka Mali, over the course of their more than 30-year musical career, have translated into Finnish, recorded and on numerous occasions publicly performed songs of Vladimir Vysotsky.

Throughout his lengthy musical career, Jaromír Nohavica, a famed Czech singer, translated and performed numerous songs of Vladimir Vysotsky, most notably Песня о друге (Píseň o příteli – Song about a friend).

In 2018, chess Grandmaster and former World Chess Champion Garry Kasparov made an appearance on Desert Island Discs, where he discussed his lifelong appreciation for Vysotsky's music. Notably, he revealed that prior to all 96 matches played between the 1984-1985 Championship and the 1985 Championship against Anatoly Karpov, Kasparov would ritually listen to Vysotsky's song Koni priveredlivye (Picky Horses). In discussing the song, Kasparov stated, "We have to act, so that at least something changes today for a better tomorrow...so that we do not lose the lofty title of “human.” That was the axiom of Vysotsky. His life affirmed it by example."

The Museum of Vladimir Vysotsky in Koszalin was founded by Marlena Zimna (1969–2016) in May 1994, in her apartment, in the city of Koszalin, in Poland. Since then the museum has collected over 19,500 exhibits from different countries and currently holds Vladimir Vysotsky's personal items, autographs, drawings, letters, photographs and a large library containing unique film footage, vinyl records, CDs and DVDs. A special place in the collection held by one of Vladimir Vysotsky's guitars, on which he played at a concert in Casablanca in April 1976. Vladimir Vysotsky presented this guitar to Moroccan journalist Hassan El-Sayed together with an autograph (an extract from Vladimir Vysotsky's song "What Happened in Africa"), written in Russian right on the guitar.

In January 2023, a monument to the outstanding actor, singer and poet Vladimir Vysotsky was unveiled in Yuzhno-Sakhalinsk, in the square near the Rodina House of Culture. This monument was created by Vladimir Chebotarev.

=== Books on Vladimir Vysotsky ===
After her husband's death, urged by her friend Simone Signoret, Marina Vlady wrote a book called The Aborted Flight about her years together with Vysotsky. The book paid tribute to Vladimir's talent and rich persona, yet was uncompromising in its depiction of his addictions and the problems that they caused in their marriage. Written in French (and published in France in 1987), it was translated into Russian in tandem by Vlady and a professional translator and came out in 1989 in the USSR. Totally credible from the specialists' point of view, the book caused controversy, among other things, by shocking revelations about the difficult father-and-son relationship (or rather, the lack of any), implying that Vysotsky-senior (while his son was alive) was deeply ashamed of him and his songs which he deemed "anti-Soviet" and reported his own son to the KGB. Also in 1989 another important book of memoirs was published in the USSR, providing a bulk of priceless material for the host of future biographers, Alla Demidova's Vladimir Vysotsky, the One I Know and Love. Among other publications of note were Valery Zolotukhin's Vysotsky's Secret (2000), a series of Valery Perevozchikov's books (His Dying Hour, The Unknown Vysotsky and others) containing detailed accounts and interviews dealing with the bard's life's major controversies (the mystery surrounding his death, the truth behind Vysotsky Sr.'s alleged KGB reports, the true nature of Vladimir Vysotsky's relations with his mother Nina's second husband Georgy Bartosh etc.), Iza Zhukova's Short Happiness for a Lifetime and the late bard's sister-in-law Irena Vysotskaya's My Brother Vysotsky. The Beginnings (both 2005).

A group of enthusiasts has created a non-profit project – the mobile application "Vysotsky"

== Music ==
The multifaceted talent of Vysotsky is often described by the term "bard" (бард) that Vysotsky has never been enthusiastic about. He thought of himself mainly as an actor and poet rather than a singer, and once remarked, "I do not belong to what people call bards or minstrels or whatever." With the advent of portable tape-recorders in the Soviet Union, Vysotsky's music became available to the masses in the form of home-made reel-to-reel audio tape recordings (later on cassette tapes).

Vysotsky accompanied himself on a Russian seven-string guitar, with a raspy voice singing ballads of love, peace, war, everyday Soviet life and of the human condition. He was largely perceived as the voice of honesty, at times sarcastically jabbing at the Soviet government, which made him a target for surveillance and threats. In France, he has been compared with Georges Brassens; in Russia, however, he was more frequently compared with Joe Dassin, partly because they were the same age and died in the same year, although their ideologies, biographies, and musical styles are very different. Vysotsky's lyrics and style greatly influenced Jacek Kaczmarski, a Polish songwriter and singer who touched on similar themes.

Not being officially recognized as a poet and singer, Vysotsky performed wherever and whenever he could – in the theater (where he worked), at universities, in private apartments, village clubs, and in the open air. It was not unusual for him to give several concerts in one day. He used to sleep little, using the night hours to write. With few exceptions, he wasn't allowed to publish his recordings with Melodiya, which held a monopoly on the Soviet music industry. His songs were passed on through amateur, fairly low-quality recordings on vinyl discs and magnetic tape, resulting in his immense popularity. Cosmonauts even took his music on cassette into orbit.

=== Themes ===
Vysotsky's songs—over 600 of them—were written about almost any imaginable theme. The earliest were blatnaya pesnya ("outlaw songs"). These songs were based either on the life of the common people in Moscow or on life in the criminals, sometimes in Gulag. Vysotsky slowly grew out of this phase and started singing more serious, though often satirical, songs. Many of these songs were about war. These war songs were not written to glorify war, but rather to expose the listener to the emotions of those in extreme, life-threatening situations. Most Soviet veterans would say that Vysotsky's war songs described the truth of war far more accurately than more official "patriotic" songs.

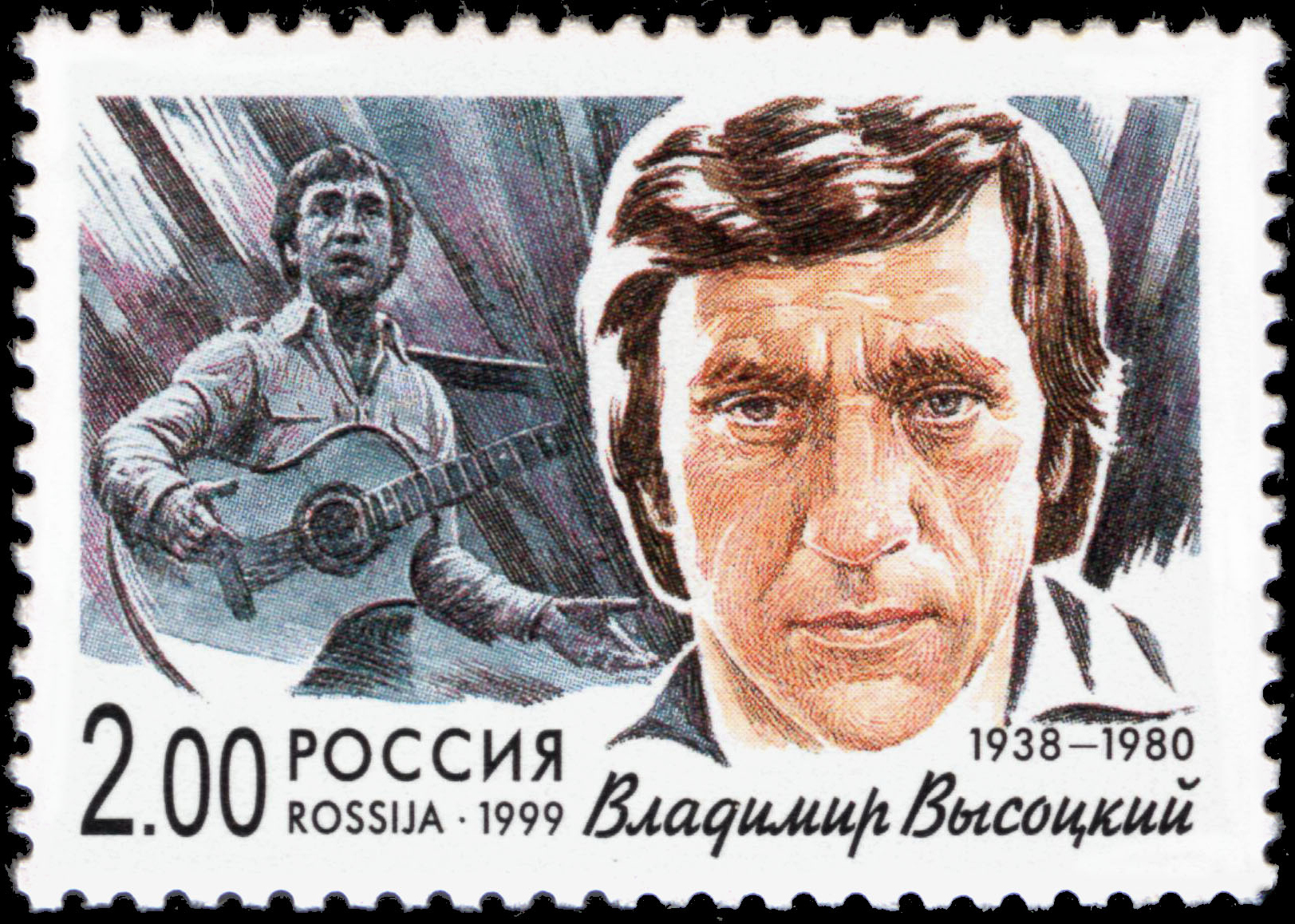
A Russian stamp honoring Vysotsky, 1999.

Nearly all of Vysotsky's songs are in the first person, although he is almost never the narrator. When singing his criminal songs, he would adopt the accent and intonation of a Moscow thief, and when singing war songs, he would sing from the point of view of a soldier. In many of his philosophical songs, he adopted the role of inanimate objects. In essence, Vysotsky's songs were miniature theatrical dramatizations, often with a protagonist and containing many dialogues. He achieved such a high level of authenticity that many real-life former prisoners, war veterans, boxers, and footballers refused to believe that Vysotsky had not himself spent time behind bars, fought in the war, or been a boxer or footballer. Following his first solo concerts at the Leningrad Nuclear Physics Institute, he published a note for his fans with the words: "Now that you've heard all these songs, please, don't you make a mistake of mixing me with my characters, I am not like them at all. With love, Vysotsky, 20 April 1965, XX c." He found it necessary to make similar excuses throughout his career.

Veteran screenwriter Nikolay Erdman said of Vysotsky's work: "I can well understand how Mayakovsky or Seryozha Yesenin did it. How Volodya Vysotsky does it is totally beyond me." (Note: There are other versions of Erdmann's phrase, one of them mentioning Okudzhava and Galich. Biographer V. Novikov insists that Mayakovsky/Yesenin one is the authentic one.)

However, one of the themes in his repertoire was considerably more autobiographical: alcoholism, with which he personally struggled. By the time of his breakthrough in 1967, he had already suffered several physical breakdowns, and once was sent (by the director of the Taganka Theatre) to a rehabilitation clinic, a visit he had to repeat multiple times thereafter.

=== Musical style ===
Musically, virtually all of Vysotsky's songs were written in a minor key, and tended to employ from three to seven chords. Vysotsky composed his songs and played them exclusively on the Russian seven string guitar, often tuned a tone or a tone-and-a-half below the traditional Russian "Open G major" tuning. This guitar, with its specific Russian tuning, makes a slight yet notable difference in chord voicings from those of the standard tuned six string Spanish (classical) guitar, and it became a staple of his sound. Because Vysotsky tuned down a tone and a half, his strings had less tension, which also colored the sound.

His earliest songs were usually written in C minor (with the guitar tuned a tone down from DGBDGBD to CFACFAC), using the following chord shapes:

Chord name	Fret numbers (bass to tenor string)
C minor	[0 × 3 3 2 3 3]
A sharp 7 rootless	[X 0 5 5 3 5 5]
A major	[X 5 5 5 5 5 5]
E major	[X X 6 × 5 6 7]
F 7 rootless	[X X 7 7 5 7 7]
D minor	[X 0 8 8 7 8 8]
F major	[2 2 2 2 2 2 2]

Songs written in this key include "Stars" (Zvyozdy), "My friend has left for Magadan" (Moy drug uyekhal v Magadan), and most of his "outlaw songs".

At around 1970, Vysotsky began writing and playing exclusively in A minor (guitar tuned to CFACFAC), which he continued doing until his death. The main chord shapes he based his songs on were:

Chord name	Fret numbers (bass to tenor string)
A minor	[X X 0 4 4 3 4]
A major	[X X 4 4 4 4 4]
D minor	[X X 5 5 4 5 5]
E 7	[X X X 4 3 2 2]
F major	[2 2 2 2 2 2 2]
C major	[X X X 0 2 3 4]
A 7 rootless	[X X 4 4 2 4 4]

Vysotsky used his fingers instead of a pick to pluck and strum, as was the tradition with Russian guitar playing. He used a variety of finger picking and strumming techniques. One of his favorite was to play an alternating bass with his thumb as he plucked or strummed with his other fingers.

Often, Vysotsky would neglect to check the tuning of his guitar, which is particularly noticeable on earlier recordings. According to some accounts, Vysotsky would get upset when friends would attempt to tune his guitar, leading some to believe that he preferred to play slightly out of tune as a stylistic choice. Much of this is also attributable to the fact that a guitar that is tuned down more than one whole step (Vysotsky would sometimes tune as much as two and a half steps down) is prone to intonation problems.

=== Singing style ===
Apart from his recognizable raspy voice, Vysotsky had a unique singing style. He had an unusual habit of elongating consonants instead of vowels; when a syllable was sung for a prolonged period, he would extend the consonant.

== Filmography ==
- 1959: Female Age-Mates (Сверстницы) (Mosfilm, Director: Vasiliy Ordynsky)
- 1961: Dima Gorin's Career (Карьера Димы Горина) (Gorky Film Studio, Director: Frunze Dovlatyan & Lev Mirsky) as Sofron
- 1962: 713 Requests Permission to Land (713-й просит посадку) (Lenfilm, Director: Grigory Nikulin) as an American sailor
- 1962: Shore Leave (Увольнение на берег) (Mosfilm, Director: Feliks Mironer) as Pyotr
- 1962: Greshnitsa (Director: Gavriil Egiazarov and Fyodor Filippov)
- 1963: Penalty Kick (Штрафной удар) (Gorky Film Studio, Director: Veniamin Dorman) as Aleksandr Nikulin
- 1964: The Living and the Dead (Живые и мёртвые) (Mosfilm, Director: Aleksandr Stolper)
- 1965: Our House (Наш дом) (Mosfilm, Director: Vasily Pronin) as Mechanic
- 1965: On Tomorrow's Street (На завтрашней улице) (Mosfilm, Director: Fyodor Filipov) as Pyotr Markin
- 1965: The Cook (Стряпуха) (Mosfilm, Director: Edmond Keosayan)
- 1966: Stryapukha (Director: Edmond Keosayan)
- 1966: I Was Born in Childhood (Я родом из детства) (Belarusfilm, Director: Viktor Turov)
- 1966: Vertical (Вертикаль) (Odessa Film Studio, Director: Stanislav Govorukhin and Boris Durov) as Volodya, the radio operator
- 1966: Sasha-Sashen'ka (Саша-Сашенька) (Belarusfilm, Director: Vitaly Chetverikov) as Singer with Guitar (uncredited)
- 1967: Brief Encounters (Короткие встречи) (Odessa Film Studio, Director: Kira Muratova) as Maksim
- 1967: War Under the Rooftops (Война под крышами) (Belarusfilm, Director: Victor Turov)
- 1968: Two Comrades Were Serving (Служили два товарища) (Mosfilm, Director: Yevgeny Karelov) as Alexander Brusentsov
- 1968: Intervention (Интервенция) (Lenfilm, Director: Gennadi Poloka) as Michel Voronov / Brodsky
- 1969: Master of the Taiga (Хозяин тайги) (Mosfilm, Director: Vladimir Nazarov)
- 1969: Dangerous Tour (Опасные гастроли) (Odessa Film Studio; Director: Georgi Yungvald-Khilkevich) as George Bengalsky
- 1969: White Explosion (Белый взрыв) (Odessa Film Studio, Director: Stanislav Govorukhin) as Kapitan
- 1973: The Fourth (Четвёртый) – Mosfilm; Director: Alexandr Stolper
- 1973: Bad Good Man (Плохой хороший человек) (Lenfilm, Director: Iosif Kheifits) as Von Koren
- 1975: The Only Road (Единственная дорога) (Mosfilm & Titograd Studio, Director: Vladimir Pavlovich) as Sofer Solodov
- 1975: Kontrabanda (Director: Stanislav Govorukhin) (singing voice)
- 1975: The Flight of Mr. McKinley (Бегство мистера Мак-Кинли) (Mosfilm, Director: Mikhail Schweitzer) as Bill Siger, a singer
- 1976: The Only One (Единственная) (Lenfilm, Director: Iosif Heifits) as Boris Ilyich, muzikalno-khorovogo kruzhka
- 1976: How Czar Peter the Great Married Off His Moor (Сказ про то, как царь Пётр арапа женил) (Mosfilm, Director: Alexander Mitta) as Ibragim
- 1976: 72 gradusa nizhe nulya (Director: Sergei Danilin and Yevgeni Tatarsky) (singing voice)
- 1977: The Two of Them (Они вдвоём) (Mafilm, Director: Márta Mészáros)
- 1979: The Meeting Place Cannot Be Changed (Место встречи изменить нельзя) (TV Mini-Series, Director: Stanislav Govorukhin) as Gleb Zheglov
- 1979: Little Tragedies (Маленькие трагедии) (TV Mini-Series, Director: Mikhail Schveytser) as Don Juan (final appearance)

== Bibliography ==
- Wladimir Wyssozki. Aufbau Verlag 1989 (DDR): Zerreißt mir nicht meine silbernen Saiten....
- Vysotsky, Vladimir (1990): Hamlet With a Guitar. Moscow, Progress Publishers. ISBN 5-01-001125-5
- Vysotsky, Vladimir (2003): Songs, Poems, Prose. Moscow, Eksmo. ISBN
- Vysotsky, Vladimir / Mer, Nathan (trans) (1991): Songs & Poems. ISBN 0-89697-399-9
- Vysotsky, Vladimir (1991): I Love, Therefore I Live. ISBN 0-569-09274-4
- Vlady, Marina (1987): Vladimir ou Le Vol Arrêté. Paris, Ed. Fayard. ISBN 2-213-02062-0 (Vladimir or the Aborted Flight)
- Влади М. Владимир, или Прерванный полет. М.: Прогресс, 1989.
- Vlady, Marina / Meinert, Joachim (transl) (1991): Eine Liebe zwischen zwei Welten. Mein Leben mit Wladimir Wyssozki. Weimar, Aufbau Verlag. ISBN

=== Other books ===
- Novel about Girls (Roman o devochkah)
- Vacation in Vienna (Venskie kanikulyi)

== Discography ==
=== Lifetime ===
- Selected songs Melodiya, 1974
- Tightrope (Натянутый канат), PolyGram, 1977
- Алиса в стране чудес / Alice in Wonderland (1976) [2 vinyls]. Musical play, an adaptation of Alice in Wonderland, with Klara Rumyanova, Vladimir Vysotsky, Vsevolod Abdulov. Lyrics and music by Vladimir Vysotsky

=== Posthumous releases ===
==== Bulgaria ====
- Автопортрет / Self-Portrait (1981) [12-inch vinyl] [LP] Balkanton

==== France ====
- Le Vol Arrêté (1981) [LP], (2000) [CD]
- Le Monument (1995) [CD]

==== Germany ====
- Wir drehen die Erde (1993) [CD]
- Lieder vom Krieg (1995) [CD]

==== Russia ====
- Песни / Songs (1980) [LP] Melodiya
  - Collection of songs published shortly after his death. [Melodiya Stereo C60-14761.2]
- Sons Are Leaving For Battle (1987) [double LP] Melodiya
  - War songs. Archive recordings from between 1960 and 1980. [Melodiya MONO M60 47429 008/006]
- На концертах Владимира Высоцкого / At Vladimir Vysotsky's concerts
  - 01, 02, 03, ... 21 (1986–1990) [12-inch vinyl]
- Marina Vlady and Vladimir Vysotsky (1996) [CD] [Melodiya]
- Vysotsky On Compact Cassettes – 30 individual cassettes in total, also sold as a box set (1996) [Aprelevka Sound Production]
- MP3 Kollektsiya: Vladimir Vysotsky [SoLyd Records]
  Concert and Studio recordings, (period 1979–1980) (2002) [CD: MP3 192 kbit/s]
  - Disk 1,
  - Disk 2,
  - Disk 3
  - Disk 4
- Platinovaya Kollektsiya: Vladimir Vysotsky (2003) [2 CDs]: CD 1, CD 2

== See also ==
- Vladimir Vysotsky filmography
- Conversation at the Television Set
- Lukomorye no longer exists
