= Code of Duty =

- Written by: Andrey Tumarkin
- Directed by: Mikhail Vasserbaum
- Starring: Aleksandr Konstantinov; Maksim Mityashin; Dmitriy Pchela; Vladimir Sterzhakov; Andrey Papanin; Darya Kovalevskaya; Yevgeny Bakalov
- Composer: Vitaliy Mukanyaev
- No. of seasons: 1
- No. of episodes: 16

Production
- Producers: Denis Berezin; Sergei Shcheglov; Andrey Tumarkin; Inessa Yurchenko
- Cinematography: Vladislav Gurtchin

Original release
- Network: NTV
- Release: 5 November 2024

Code of Duty (Russian: Комитет) is a 2022 Russian television series directed by Mikhail Vasserbaum. It stars Aleksandr Konstantinov and Maksim Mityashin.

== Plot ==
The series begins in Leningrad. The film follows a group of friends who begin their service in the KGB. They will experience the war in Afghanistan, Perestroika, and the gangsterism of the 1990s.

== Cast ==
- Aleksandr Konstantinov as Dmitriy Vasilev
- Maksim Mityashin as Vladimir Naumov
- Dmitriy Pchela as Pavel Ivanov
- Vladimir Sterzhakov
- Andrey Papanin
- Darya Kovalevskaya as Zhenya Ivanova
- Yevgeny Bakalov

== Production ==
Filming took place in Saint Petersburg.
