= Lidiya Seifullina =

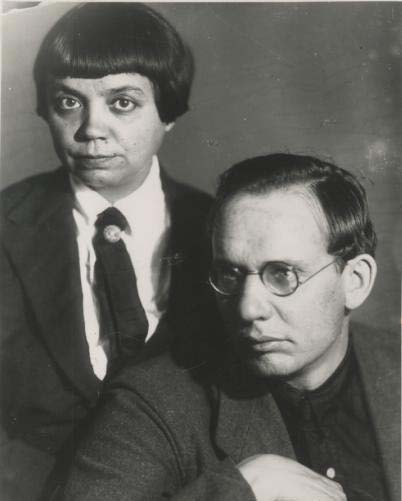
Portrait of Seifullina and Pravdukhin

Lidiya Nikolaevna Seifullina (Russian: Ли́дия Никола́евна Сейфу́ллина; 23 March 1889 – 25 April 1954) was a Soviet journalist, playwright, novelist, and short story writer. Her short story "Virineia" serves as the basis for an opera by Sergei Slonimsky.

== Biography ==
Born near Magnitogorsk, Seifullina was the daughter of a peasant woman, who died when she was five, and a Tatar raised by an Orthodox priest; her father would go on to become a priest himself. She began working at 17, publishing her first short stories in 1917 and graduating from the Moscow Higher Pedagogical Courses in 1920. She moved to Novosibirsk and there wrote the short novel Four Chapters, which was published in 1922 and earned her some notice. She continued to write stories and novels depicting the clash between the new order and the old. After the 1920s she turned more to journalism and education. She is best known for her short story "Virineia", about a peasant woman who, having become a believer in Soviet ideals, begins to chafe at the restrictions placed on her by traditional patriarchal society. It serves as the basis for an opera by Sergei Slonimsky, completed in 1967.

Seifullina was married to the literary critic and journalist Valerian Pravdukhin, who assisted in adapting "Virineia" as a play that was greatly popular in Soviet theaters. He was executed in 1939 during the Great Purge, and some sources claim that as the wife of an "enemy of the people" she was arrested and sent to the gulag, released only after the death of Joseph Stalin. Other sources state that she remained free and living in Moscow, aiding the war effort. It was in that city that she died.
