= Monument to Vladimir Vysotsky (Rostov-on-Don) =

Coordinates: 47.22878°N 39.73718°E

- Russian: Памятник Владимиру Высотскому
- Interactive map of Monument to Vladimir Vysotsky
- Location: Rostov-on-Don, Rostov Oblast, Russia
- Designer: Anatoly Sknarin
- Material: bronze
- Height: 3.4 m (11 ft)
- Opening date: July 25, 2014
- Dedicated to: Vladimir Vysotsky

The Monument to Vladimir Vysotsky is a bronze monument installed and opened in the summer of 2014 in Rostov-on-Don on Pushkinskaya Street.

== History ==
In 2009, the Fund-raising for the creation of the monument to Vladimir Vysotsky was organized and started. A competition was held, as a result of which the sculptors presented several projects of the work, among which the winner was the project of Anatoly Sknarin.

The opening of the memorial took place on July 25, 2014, the day of the 34th anniversary of the death of the poet, not far from the House of Cinema in Pushkinskaya Street.
