= Dima Gorin's Career =

- Russian: Карьера Димы Горина
- Directed by: Frunze Dovlatyan; Lev Mirsky
- Written by: Boris Medovoy
- Starring: Aleksandr Demyanenko; Tatyana Konyukhova; Vladimir Vysotsky
- Edited by: A. Klebanova
- Music by: Andrei Eshpai
- Release date: 1961
- Running time: 100 min.
- Country: Soviet Union
- Language: Russian

Dima Gorin's Career (Russian: Карьера Димы Горина) is a 1961 Soviet comedy film directed by Frunze Dovlatyan and Lev Mirsky.

The film tells about the employee of the savings bank, who as a result of his mistake was forced to go to the construction site in Siberia, where he found his love.

== Plot ==
Dmitry Gorin is an exemplary employee of a Soviet savings bank, eagerly awaiting a promotion to branch manager. However, just as his promotion seems certain, he accidentally gives out an excess sum of money to a worker from the taiga involved in constructing the Siberia–Urals power line. The worker promptly leaves for Siberia, and to retrieve the money and restore his standing with his superiors, Dmitry is compelled to follow him into the remote wilderness. Yet, Dmitry finds himself in no hurry to return to Moscow.

Shortly before his departure, Dmitry, trying to obscure what he considers an unflattering image in a newsreel, pieces together a collage of his ideal woman from scraps of various photographs. By coincidence, upon arriving in Siberia, he meets the very woman from his collage: the beautiful and spirited Galina Berezka, who happens to be a team leader at the construction site.

Dmitry bids farewell to his career in the savings bank and becomes a laborer in the team led by Gennady Drobot—the man to whom he had mistakenly given the extra money. Overcoming the challenges of learning a new trade, adapting to the harsh conditions of the taiga, and forming meaningful friendships, Dmitry undergoes a profound transformation. He ultimately wins the heart of Galina, the woman of his dreams. Although the narrator at the film's conclusion hints at the possibility of Dmitry returning to finance in the future, it emphasizes that for him, "personal happiness is forever."

== Cast ==
- Aleksandr Demyanenko as Dmitry Grigoryevich Gorin
- Tatyana Konyukhova as Galya Beryozka, brigadier
- Vladimir Seleznyov as Gennady Drobot, brigadier
- Vladimir Vysotsky as driver Sofron
- Yevgeny Kudryashyov as Ivan Moskalyov, brigade member from Mosikha
- Nikolai Kazakov as member of Drobot brigade
- Aleksei Vanin as Panteley, member of Drobot brigade
- Vitaly Chermenyov as Pavlik
- Valentina Ananina as member of Beryozka brigade
- Zinovy Gerdt as narrator
