= Popkin =

Popkin is a surname. Notable people with the surname include:

- Anne Hunter Popkin, founding member of Bread and Roses
- Barry Popkin (born 1944), professor of nutrition at UNC-Chapel Hill
- Cedric Popkin (1890–1968), suspected killer of the Red Baron
- Gary Popkin, professor at New York City College of Technology
- Lenka Popkin (born 1978), Czech trampolinist
- Richard Popkin (1923–2005), academic philosopher
- Samuel L. Popkin (born 1942), political scientist
- Zelda Popkin (1898–1983), fiction author

== See also ==
- Popkins, a British racehorse
- Popkin, a term meaning "sandwich" used in Stephen King's book The Drawing of the Three
- Pupkin
