= Female Age-Mates =

- Russian: Сверстницы
- Directed by: Vasili Ordynsky
- Written by: Alla Belyakova
- Starring: Lyudmila Krylova; Lidiya Fedoseyeva-Shukshina; Margarita Koselyeva; Vladimir Kostin; Vsevolod Safonov
- Cinematography: Igor Slabnevich
- Edited by: N. Anikina
- Music by: Venyamin Basner
- Release date: 1959
- Running time: 84 minute
- Country: Soviet Union
- Language: Russian

Female Age-Mates (Russian: Сверстницы) is a 1959 Soviet romantic drama film directed by Vasili Ordynsky.

== Plot ==
The life paths of three school friends diverged: Tanya began to study medicine, Kira decided to become an actress, and Svetlana as a result of unsuccessful exams began working at the factory. All of them will experience a feeling of love, but only one of them will be happy.

== Cast ==
- Lyudmila Krylova as Svetlana
- Lidiya Fedoseyeva-Shukshina as Tanya (as Lidiya Fedoseeva)
- Margarita Koselyeva as Kira (as Margarita Koshelyova)
- Vladimir Kostin as Vassya
- Vsevolod Safonov as Arkadi
- Kirill Stolyarov as Yurotschka
- Vladimir Koretsky as Gleb
- Vladimir Vysotskiy
