= Gennadi Poloka =

Russian film director, screenwriter and actor

- Born: Gennadi Invanovich Poloka; 15 July 1930; Kuybyshev, RSFSR, Soviet Union (now Russia)
- Died: 5 December 2014 (aged 84); Moscow, Russia
- Other name: Egor Gorashchenko (alias)
- Occupations: Film director, screenwriter, actor
- Years active: 1956–2010

Gennadi Ivanovich Poloka (Russian: Генна́дий Ива́нович Поло́ка; 15 July 1930, Kuybyshev – 5 December 2014, Moscow) was a Soviet and Russian film director, screenwriter, producer and actor. People's Artist of Russia (1998). IV Class Order "For Merit to the Fatherland" (2011).

== Early years ==
Gennadi Poloka was born in Kuybyshev (now Samara). His family name comes from his Slovak great-grandfather who left Austria-Hungary for the Russian Empire just before the start of the World War I, saving from ethnic cleansing of Slavs. Poloka commented on his ethnicity: I come from a multinational family: there were Poles, Germans, Ukrainians... I have a strange surname. Every time I arrive in some country, there's always a question at the press-conference about my ethnicity. But I have a straight answer: 'I am Russian'. I really love Russia and can't live more than ten days abroad. Poloka decided to become a film director since the age of 10, after he saw The Great Waltz. He survived the war in evacuation in Novosibirsk, together with his mother.

== Education ==
After the end of war Poloka tried to enter director's courses, but was rejected for being too young. From 1947 to 1951 he studied at the Mikhail Shchepkin Higher Theatre School, actor's lab. In 1957 he graduated from VGIK, finally becoming a film director.

== Career ==
Poloka started his career in cinematography in 1956. He directed several documentary films and worked as an assistant director with Grigori Aleksandrov, Mikhail Romm, Boris Barnet and others. In 1962 a children's movie Kapron Fishnet was released, co-directed by Poloka and Levan Shengeliya. Four years later he directed his first independent feature – The Republic of ShKID based on the acclaimed children's novel by two former orphans (who served as screenwriters). It became one of the leaders of the Soviet box office in 1967. Between 1967 and 1968 Poloka worked on Intervention based on the drama of the same name by Lev Slavin. It was not released for political reasons until 1989.

Poloka later worked in various genres: adventure film (One of Us), comedy-romance (Melody for Two Voices), criminal comedy (Was There Karotin?) and adventure comedy (The Return of the Battleship), which Poloka also wrote and produced. Between 1976 and 1980 he worked at Studio Ekran as the head of the Musical Films Studio department. In 1996 he was awarded a prize by the presidential council film festival Kinotavr. In addition, he appeared in films as an actor.

== Death ==
Gennadi Poloka died at the age of 84 in Moscow in 2014. He was buried at Vagankovo Cemetery. He was survived by his wife Olga and two daughters, Natalia and Veronika.

== Selected filmography ==
Year	English Title	Original Title	Notes
1962	Kapron Fishnet	Капроновые сети	Co-director with Levan Shengeliya
1965	Fury	Ярость	Actor
1966	The Republic of ShKID	Республика ШКИД	Director
1968	Intervention	Интервенция	Director
1969	Castling Long	Рокировка в длинную сторону	Actor
1970	One of Us	Один из нас	Director
1972	The Prince and the Pauper	Принц и нищий	Actor
1974	One at Once	Одиножды один	Director
1980	Our Mission	Наше призвание	Director, screenwriter
1989	Was There Karotin?	А был ли Каротин?	Director, screenwriter
1996	The Return of the Battleship	Возвращение «Броненосца»	Director, producer, screenwriter, actor
2010	An Eye for an Eye	Око за око	Director, screenwriter
