= Vladimir Sterzhakov =

Russian film and theater actor

- Владимир Стержаков
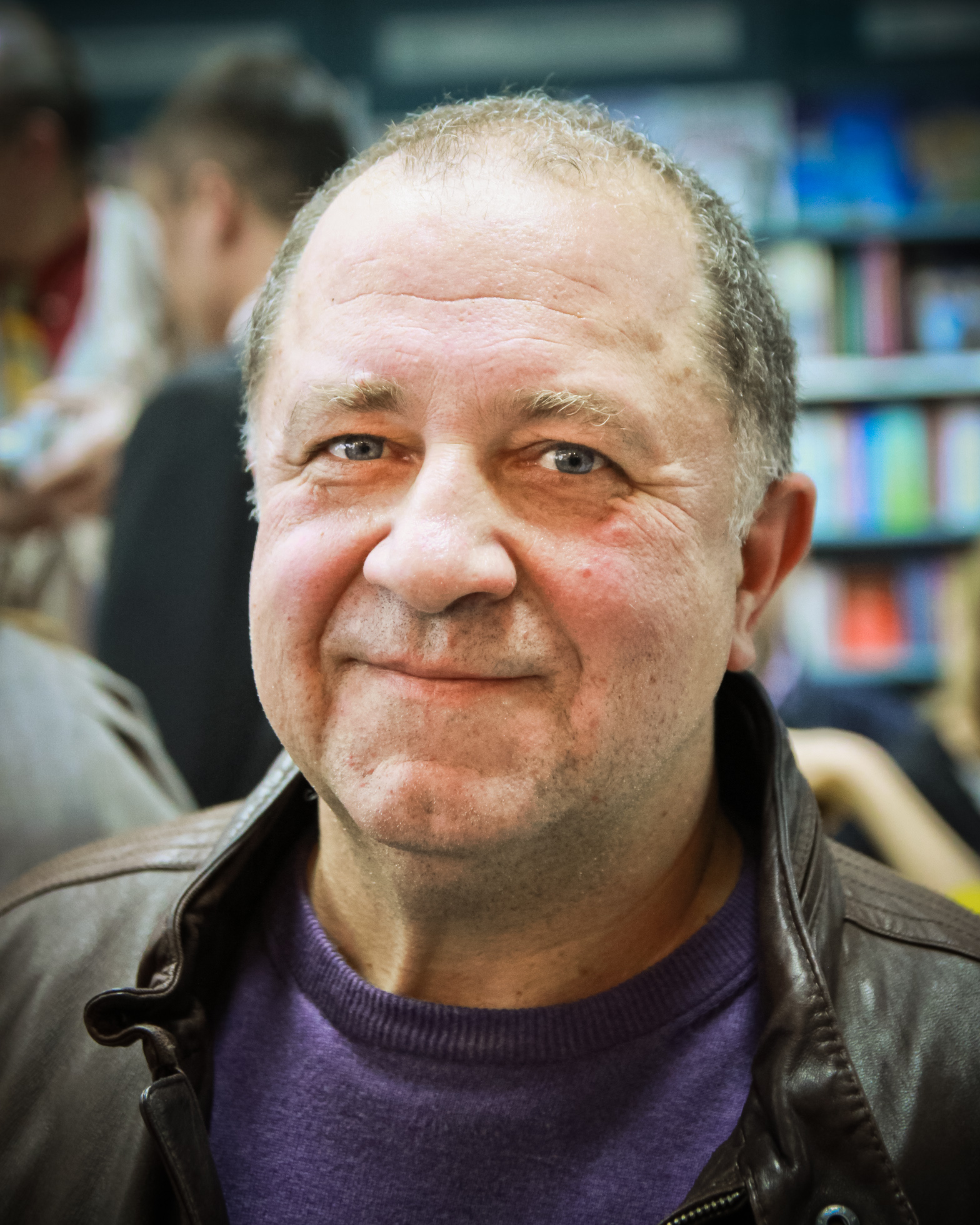
- Sterzhakov in 2013
- Born: Vladimir Alexandrovich Sterzhakov; 6 June 1959 (age 66); Tallinn, Estonia
- Occupation: Actor
- Years active: 1981–present
- Spouse: Alla Sterzhakova
- Children: 2

Vladimir Alexandrovich Sterzhakov (Russian: Владимир Александрович Стержаков; born June 6, 1959) is a Soviet and Russian actor of theater and cinema.

== Biography ==
Since 1981 to 2001 he worked at the Moscow Art Theater.

== Selected filmography ==
- 1986 Plumbum, or The Dangerous Game as bartender
- 1990 Enemy of the People – Bukharin as Mikhail Koltsov
- 1990 Taxi Blues as Musician in the Taxi
- 1995 Fatal Eggs as Morzhansky
- 1996 The Return of the Battleship as Lyubim Avdeyevich Polishchuk
- 2000 House for the Rich as architect
- 2005 Not by Bread Alone as Ganichev
- 2007 Valery Kharlamov. Overtime as Anatoly Tarasov
- 2011-2012 Daddy's Daughters as Anton Stepanovich, director
- 2011 Comrade Stalin as Kliment Voroshilov
- 2013 Metro as Head of Moscow Metro
- 2014 Molodezhka as Semyon Valerievich Krasnitskiy, sports manager
- 2014 Spiral as Mikhail, lawyer
- 2015 Kitchen as Daniil Alyokhin
- 2018 Yolki 7 as train manager
- 2022 Mister Knockout as Chairman of the USSR Boxing Federation
- 2022 Code of Duty
