= The Return of the Battleship =

- Russian: Возвращение «Броненосца»
- Directed by: Gennadi Poloka
- Written by: Vladimir Bragin; Aleksei Kapler; Gennadi Poloka
- Produced by: Gennadi Poloka; Mikhail Zusmanovich
- Starring: Mikhail Urzhumtsev; Lyudmila Potapova; Elena Mayorova; Vladimir Sterzhakov; Ivan Bortnik
- Cinematography: Yevgeniy Davydov
- Edited by: G. Sviridenko
- Music by: Veniamin Basner
- Production companies: Lenfilm; Belarusfilm; Gorky Film Studio
- Release date: 1996
- Running time: 160 minutes
- Countries: Russia; Belarus
- Language: Russian

The Return of the Battleship (Russian: Возвращение «Броненосца», romanized: Vozvrashchenie 'Bronenostsa') is a 1996 Russian-Belarusian comedy film directed by Gennadi Poloka.

== Plot ==
The film tells about a man who does a lot of funny things, for example, marries a prostitute to re-educate her, challenges the criminal world and faces the famous Sergei Eisenstein.

== Cast ==
- Mikhail Urzhumtsev as Iogann Gerts
- Lyudmila Potapova as Klavdiya
- Elena Mayorova as Verka
- Alexander Lenkov as Verka's boyfriend
- Vladimir Sterzhakov as Lyubim Avdeyevich Polishchuk
- Ivan Bortnik as Syrovegin
- Tatyana Vasilyeva as Lizaveta
- Valentin Burov as Kovbasyuk
- Georgy Shtil as Solomon Getman
- Armen Dzhigarkhanyan as Filipp
- Boris Novikov as Pikeinyj zhilet
- Igor Kvasha as Mikitov-Razumnik
- Aleksey Buldakov as Pankrat
- Georgy Martirosyan as Lev
- Valery Nosik as Khan-Suleiman
- Igor Dmitriev as Bizon-Nemigailo
- Boris Brunov as Fedya Boyarov
- Yaroslav Boyko as worker from the Eisenstein's film crew
- Gennadi Poloka as film director
- Elena Obraztsova as cameo
