= Pupkin =

Pupkin is a surname. Notable persons of the surname include:

- María Paulina Milada Kantor Pupkin, or Pauline Kantor, Chilean politician and journalist
- Claude Pupkin, CEO of American Shale Oil, defunct American company

== Fictional characters ==
- Anton Mitrofanovich Pupkin, a fictional character invented by characters of the Russian novel The Republic of ShKID
- Archie Pupkin III from Box Office Poison
- Peter Pupkin from Sunshine Sketches of a Little Town
- Pupkin the Puppy, a collectible toy from the Shopkins series
- Rupert Pupkin, stand-up comedian from The King of Comedy (film) and other films
- Samuel Pupkin, psychiatrist from Narco (film)
- Vasya Pupkin, Russian placeholder name for an average man
- Vasha Pupkin (ヴァーシャパプキン, Bāsha Papukin) is among the main characters of Yakitori: Soldiers of Misfortune, a Japanese novel series
- Anton Mitrofanovich Pupkin (Russian: Антон Митрофанович Пупкин), a "twice-fictional" name from the Russian novel The Republic of ShKID: Pupkin was a character in amateur films shot in the ShKID orphanade

== See also ==
- Pupkin (Pupkin Film), a Dutch film production company under French TF1 Group holding company
- Puppchen
- Puppy
- Pup (disambiguation)
- Papkin (disambiguation)
- Pepkin
- Pipkin (disambiguation)
- Popkin
