= Museum of Vladimir Vysotsky in Koszalin =

Museum in Poland

Coordinates: 54.1895°N 16.1847°E

The Museum of Vladimir Vysotsky in Koszalin (Polish: Muzeum Włodzimierza Wysockiego w Koszalinie) is a private museum dedicated to Russian singer and actor Vladimir Vysotsky in Koszalin, Poland.

== History ==
The museum was started by enthusiast, author, and publicist Marlena Zimna (1969 – 2016) in May 1994 in her apartment. The base collection is Marlena's, which she began to collect in 1984. The initial collection had 300 exhibits, and has since grown to over 19,500 exhibits from different countries.

== Collection ==
The collection holds poet's personal items, autographs, drawings, drafts, letters, photographs, unique film footage, vinyl records, CDs, DVD, a large library, a video library, artistic productions dedicated to Vysotsky, posters, playbills, theater pamphlets, documents, bookplates, postal stamps, and even items made in accordance with the well-known principle of "three K" (commerce, conjuncture, kitsch): dolls matryoshkas "Vysotsky", matchboxes with a portrait of the poet, stereo greeting card, calendars, and even plastic bags.

=== Poem on guitar ===
A special place in the collection takes guitar, on which Vysotsky played at a concert in Casablanca in April 1976. It was stored by Moroccan journalist Hassan El-Sayed, to whom Vladimir presented it together with an autograph, a paraphrase of Vysotski's song "What Happened in Africa" (Что случилось в Африке), written on the guitar:

Original Russian text

В желтой жаркой Африке,
Забыв мороз московский,
Как-то вдруг вне графика
Выступил Высоцкий.

English translation

In the yellow hot Africa,
Forgetting about Moscow frost,
Outside his schedule
Vysotsky gave a concert.

Africa, Casablanca, 1976, April. To Hassan from Volodya. [Signature].

== Activities ==
Among the activities of the museum - dedicated to the 30th anniversary of the death of Vysotsky's concert in Koszalin with participation polish stars, including Daniel Olbrychski (2000), the annual International Festival of Documentary Films about Vladimir Vysotsky "Pasje według świętego Włodzimierza" ("St. Vladimir Passions") with participation film directors, screenwriters, the bibliographers by Vladimir Vysotsky, musicians, singers, actors from different countries (since 2003), International project of translations by Vysotsky poems in languages of the world (so far carried out 114 translations of poems and songs in 157 languages with participation 62 poets and translators from 26 countries).

On May 29, 2014, the 20th anniversary, a private Vladimir Vysotsky Institute (Polish: Instytut im. Włodzimierza Wysockiego) was established based on the museum.

== See also ==
- List of music museums
