= Valeri Zolotukhin =

Soviet and Russian stage and cinema actor (1941–2013)

- Валерий Золотухин
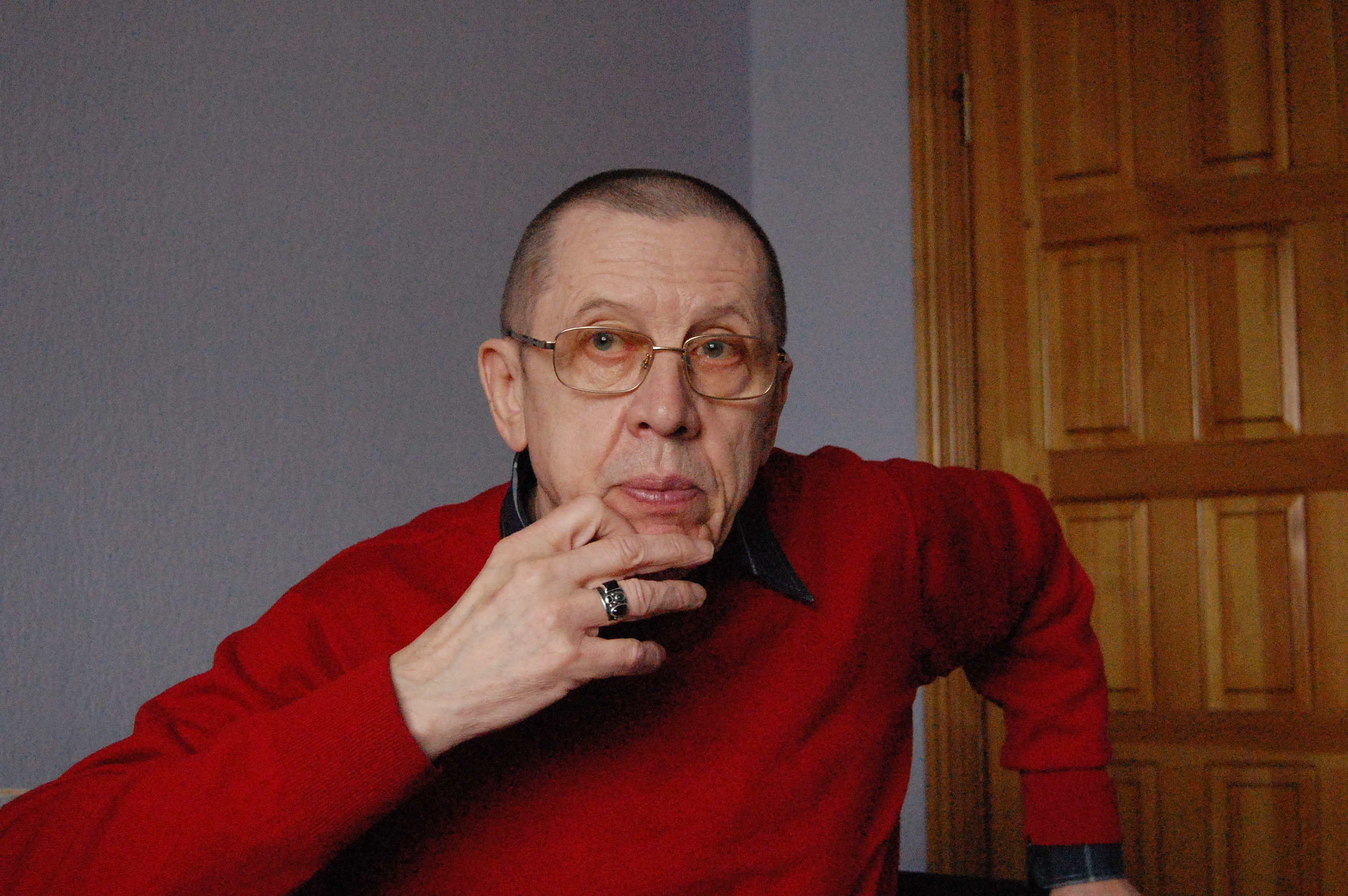
- Zolotukhin in 2009
- Born: Valeri Sergeevich Zolotukhin; 21 June 1941; Bystry Istok, Altai Krai, Russian SFSR, Soviet Union
- Died: 30 March 2013 (aged 71); Moscow, Russia
- Education: Russian Academy of Theatre Arts
- Occupations: Actor, singer, writer
- Years active: 1963—2013

Valeri Sergeevich Zolotukhin (Russian: Валерий Сергеевич Золотухин, 21 June 1941 – 30 March 2013) was a Soviet and Russian stage and cinema actor who performed at the Taganka Theatre which he also headed between 2011 and 2013. He was named People's Artist of the RSFSR in 1987.

== Biography ==
Zolotukhin was born in the Bystry Istok village (modern-day Bystroistoksky District of the Altai Krai, Russia) into a peasant family just one day before the Great Patriotic War started. He was one of the three sons of Sergei Illarionovich Zolotukhin, the head of the local kolkhoz who left for the frontline the next day. Valeri spent war years with his mother Matryona Fedoseyevna Zolotukhina. At the age of seven he survived osteomyelitis of one of his legs, spent three years in bed and had to learn to walk again. He remained lame by the time he decided to enter a theatre institute and had to hide it.

In 1963 Zolothukhin graduated from the Russian Academy of Theatre Arts, the faculty of musical theater, and entered the Mossovet Theatre where he served for a year. In 1964 he moved to the newly established Taganka Theatre under Yuri Lyubimov where he spent the rest 50 years, taking part in many plays. He was a close friend of Vladimir Vysotsky and regularly performed alongside him, both on stage and in movies. He later published several books of memoirs about their friendship and Taganka Theatre in general.

In 1965 Zolothukhin appeared in his first movie Package based on the children's novel by L. Panteleyev, in the leading part of a goofy Red Army soldier. In 1966 the film won Grand Prix at the Zlatá Praha International Television Festival (Czechoslovakia). But real fame came to Zolothukhin only in 1971 after the Bumbarash TV movie where he played a similar goofy soldier. The actor has been closely associated with the Bumbarash character ever since.

In addition to acting Zolotukhin also performed as a singer, wrote stories and read them from stage. He remained at the Taganka Theatre after the 1993 split, when a number of actors headed by Nikolai Gubenko left it following Lyubimov's plans to privatize the theatre and move to the contract system.

In 2007 he took part in the 5th State Duma elections as A Just Russia candidate, heading the Perm Krai regional group. After winning the race he passed his mandate to another party member Konstantin Beschetnov and left politics.

In 2010 another internal conflict happened, also caused by Lyubimov's decision to move to a contract system. Finally he left the theatre, and the remaining actors chose Zolotukhin as the head of Taganka despite his health problems. He still managed the theatre both as a managing and artistic director and, according to Gubenko, released five or six new plays.

On 5 March 2013 it was reported that Zolotukhin had been taken to the intensive care unit due to unknown illness. RBK mentioned that he had already resigned from his post and basically hadn't been working since December 2012 following his first hospitalization. He was later diagnosed with brain tumor.

Valeri Zolotukhin died on 30 March aged 71. In accordance with his will, he was buried in his native village Bystry Istok at the Altai Krai, on the territory of the Russian Orthodox church which he had built.

He was survived by his second wife, a violinist Tatiana Zolotukhina, his son from the first marriage to an actress Nina Shatskaya – Denis (b. 1969), an Orthodox priest, and Ivan (b. 2004) — his late son from an actress Irina Lindt. His only son from the second marriage, Sergei (b. 1979), committed suicide at the age of 27.

== Partial filmography ==
- Package (1965) — Petka Trofimov
- Intervention (1967) — Evgeny Xydias
- The Master of Taiga (1968) — Detective Vasili Snezhkin
- Late Flowers (1970) — knyaz Yegorushka
- The Flight (1970) — singer
- Hail, Mary! (1971) — Nestor Makhno
- The Twelve Chairs (1971) — vocal (voice)
- Bumbarash (1972, TV Movie) — Bumbarash
- Ivan Vasilievich: Back to the Future (1973) — George Miloslavsky (singing voice, uncredited)
- For the Rest of His Life (1975, TV Mini-Series) — uncle Sasha
- How Czar Peter the Great Married Off His Moor (1976) — Filka
- Little Tragedies (1980, TV Mini-Series) — Mozart
- Charodei (1982) — Ivan Kivrin
- Treasure Island (1982, TV Movie) — Ben Gunn
- Mother Mary (1982) — captive
- Dead Souls (1984, TV Mini-Series) — postmaster Ivan Andreevich / captain Kopeikin
- Man with an Accordion (1985)
- The Life and Extraordinary Adventures of Private Ivan Chonkin (1994) — Kilin
- Don't Play the Fool (1997) — Ivan Tarataikin
- Night Watch (2004) — Kostya's father
- Adjutants of Love (2005, TV Series) — Alexander Suvorov
- The Master and Margarita (2005, TV Mini-Series) — Nikanor Bosoy
- Brezhnev (2005, TV Series) — Igor the gamekeeper
- Deadly Force 6 (2005, TV Series) — Yuri Danilov
- Not Born Beautiful (2005–2006, TV Series) — taxi driver
- Day Watch (2006) — Kostya's father
- 1612 (2007) — stylite
- Black Lightning (2009) — Pavel Perepyolkin the inventor
- Burnt by the Sun 2 (2010) — Pindurin the barge captain
- Iron Lord (2010) — Churila
- Five Brides (2011) — grandfather
- Rzhevsky Versus Napoleon (2012) — Suvorov
- Viy (2014) — Yavtukh (final film role)
