= Boris Leskin =

Soviet and American actor (1923–2020)

- Борис Лёскин
- Born: Boris Vulfovich Leskin; 5 January 1923; Petrograd, Soviet Union
- Died: 21 February 2020 (aged 97); New York City, U.S.
- Other name: Boris Lyoskin
- Occupation: Actor
- Years active: 1953–2009

Boris Vulfovich Leskin (Russian: Борис Вульфович Лёскин; 5 January 1923 – 21 February 2020) was a Soviet and American film and theater actor.

== Biography ==
Leskin was born on 5 January 1923. In 1937 his father was arrested and executed. During World War II Leskin was employed as a sapper at the front and was wounded. He was awarded the Order of the Red Star and medals.

In 1952 he graduated from the Ostrovsky Leningrad Theatre Institute (Leonid Makaryev course). From 1951 to 1980 he worked as an actor in the Tovstonogov Bolshoi Drama Theater.

In 1980 he began his career in the United States as a theater actor in New York City. He was included on the nomination committee for Academy Awards. In 2011 director Eduard Staroselsky made a documentary about him: Bob Has Been Removed. Minesweeper Bolshoi Drama (with Sergei Yursky). Leskin died on 21 February 2020.

== Awards ==
- 2006: Pacific Meridian: Best Actor (Everything Is Illuminated)

== Filmography ==
Year	Title	Role	Notes
1953	Lyubov Yarovaya	orchestra conductor	uncredited
1954	Did We Meet Somewhere Before	viewer	
1955	Unfinished Story	malingerer	
1955	Footprints in the Snow	Vasin	
1956	Maksim Perepelitsa	Mikola	
1957	Storm	Savandeyev	
1957	At the Turning Рoint	Dimka	
1961	Dostigaev and others	Zybin	TV Movie
1963	Two Sundays	Grisha	
1965	Going Inside a Storm	pilot	
1966	First Visitor	official	
1966	12 chairs	auctioneer	TV Movie
1966	Three Fat Men	courtier	uncredited
1966	The Republic of ShKID	policeman	
1967	Wedding in Malinovka	bandit	uncredited
1968	Intervention	entrepreneur	
1969	The Truth! Nothing But the Truth!	Breshko-Breshkovskaya's teammate	uncredited
1972	Property of the Republic	episode	
1972	Boba and elephant	circus administrator	
1974	A+ for the Summer	bus driver	
1974	Tsarevich Prosha	Duke Derdidas' guard	
1975	Diary of a School Director	Olya's father	
1976	The Only One	visitor	
1976	Heavenly Swallows	Gustav Christo	
1977	An Almost Funny Story	bag and suitcase repairman	TV Movie
1978	Khanuma	prince's friend	TV Movie
1985	The Falcon and the Snowman	Mikhael	
1988	The House on Carroll Street	Hürwitz	
1988	Vampire's Kiss	Fantasy Cabbie	
1989	The Package	Soviet Foreign Minister	
1990	Cadillac Man	soviet husband	
1992	Black and White	episode	
1993	The Nick of Time	Shmonkin	
1996	A Couch in New York	cab driver #1	
1997	Men in Black	cook	
1998	World War III	Yuri Rubanov	TV Movie
2005	Everything Is Illuminated	grandfather	
2009	Cold Souls	donor	(final film role)
