= The Republic of ShKID (film) =

- Directed by: Gennadi Poloka
- Written by: Grigori Belykh; Leonid Panteleyev
- Starring: Sergei Yursky; Yulia Burygina; Pavel Luspekayev
- Cinematography: Dmitri Dolinin; Aleksander Chechulin
- Music by: Sergei Slonimsky
- Production company: Lenfilm
- Release date: 1966
- Running time: 103 min.
- Country: USSR
- Language: Russian

The Republic of ShKID (Russian: Республика ШКИД, romanized: Respublika ShKID) is a 1966 Soviet comedy-drama directed by Gennadi Poloka. The premiere of The Republic of ShKID was held on December 29, 1966; in 1967, the film became a box-office leader – it was seen by 32.6 million viewers (12th place).

== Synopsis ==
The action takes place in Petrograd in the early 1920s. Throughout the country, as reported in the credits, four million children are homeless. Juvenile offenders are caught by the Cheka and sent to boarding schools and gated colonies. Children who are not chosen by school leaders and colonies are sent to prison. Vikniksor, director of the school-commune named for Dostoevsky (Школа-коммуна имени Достоевского, ShKID), prepares the teaching staff and personnel to welcome the first set of students. They set the table for breakfast, but no one comes to the dining room: the children haven stolen keys from the janitor, Meftahutdyn, and left the school.

The children throw the keys into a tree so that it is difficult to lock the gates, and the tree is eventually cut down in order to get the keys. Having reveled enough, the children return to school on the evening of the same day and bully the staff. Most of their ire is focused on Elanlyum, the German-language teacher.

Vikniksor decides to treat the children more strictly; in the morning, the teachers and the staff send them first into the shower, then into the dining room, where they are dismissed from the table for the slightest infractions, and finally are seated at their desks. Palvan, teacher of literature, has his own "method of education"; fawning before the disorderly street children, he sings them songs (mainly "urban folklore") during lessons, without burdening them with studies.

Two weeks later, Vikniksor loses patience and dismisses Palvan. Disgruntled students start a row – they declare war on teachers under the slogan "Beat the Chaldeans!". Teachers accept the challenge, but in the end are forced to negotiate peacefully. The main "Chaldean" finds a common language with the pupils when he writes the hymn for their state.

The senior students chastise a new ShKID member, Alexei Panteleyev, because he refuses to steal cakes from Vikniksor's half-blind mother. Senior leader Kupa Kupych, "the Genius", cares for a new pupil, stunted one-eyed Kostya Fedotov, nicknamed "Mommy", as for a younger brother, but on the first night, after robbing his comrades, including Kupa, Mommy tries to escape from the school.

Kupa's disappointment rehabilitates Mommy; it changes him in such a manner that Vikniksor trust him to pick up an oxygen pillow and medicines for his sick mother; so that he does not freeze, Vikniksor gives him his own jacket. But on the way back, Mommy meets his former comrades. They take Vikniksor's jacket and wallet away from him and throw the oxygen bag into a fire. Not daring to go back to school empty-handed, Mommy is again on the street.

== Cast ==
- Sergei Yursky as Viktor Nikolaevich Sorokin (Vikniksor), director of the school
- Julia Burygin as Ella Andreevna Lyumberg (Elanlyum), teacher of German language
- Pavel Luspekayev as Konstantin Aleksandrovich Mednikov (Kostalmed), teacher of gymnastics
- Alexander Melnikov as Alexander Nikolaevich Popov (Alnikpop), teacher of history
- Anatoly Pillars as Pavel Ivanovich Arikov (Palvan), teacher of literature
- Georgy Kolosov as Meftahutdyn, Tatar, watchman and janitor
- Vera Titova as Martha, cook
- Violetta Zhuhimovich as Tonya Marconi
- Leo Weinstein as Grigori Chernykh (Yankel)
- Victor Perevalov as Goga
- Anatoli Podshivalov as Nikolai Gromonostsev (Gypsy)
- Yuri Rychkov as Carl Maria Ernst Gottfried Heinrich Dietrich von Offenbach Kaufman
- Alexander Tovstonogov as Giorgi Dzhaparidze (Jo)
- Vyacheslav Golubkov as Giorgi Ionin (also known as the "Japanese")
- Artur Isaev as Aleksey Panteleev (also known as Lyonka)
- Alexander Knights as Kostya Fedotov (Mommy)
- Vladimir Kolesnikov as Slayonov
- Aleksei Dogadaev as Savin (Savushka)
- Vyacheslav Romanov as Sparrow
- Boris Leskin as policeman

== Production ==
The scenario was based on a fictionalized autobiographical story by former pupils of the school-commune for difficult teenagers named after Fyodor Dostoevsky (ShKID), Grigori Belykh (in the story - Chernykh, aka Yankel) and Alexei Eremeev, who wrote under the pseudonym of "L. Panteleev". Written in 1926 and published a year later, the story The Republic ShKID tells of the fate of homeless adolescents who, for various reasons, find themselves in the school-commune, founded in 1920 by educator Viktor Nikolaevich Sorok-Rosinskiy, whose pupils, quite in the spirit of the time shortened his name to "Vikniksor".

The screenplay was written by one of the coauthors of the novel, Alexei Panteleyev, by then already a well known author of children's literature. Despite Panteleyev's popularity, none of the eleven directors whom he contacted were interested in making the film. Gennady Poloka, according to his own testimony, was brought in as a literary assistant to work on the film, together with Eugene Mitko:

And then someone said:"He has a director's education. Let him film it!"

Some homeless children depicted in the film were played by real juvenile delinquents, which gave the director the additional task of having to make sure that they would not break any laws.

Although Poloka's film immediately gained popularity, Panteleyev was rather disappointed; he wrote in 1967 in "Komsomolskaya Pravda":

In our school theft, card games, and usury flourished. There were violent fights. Not for a moment did the war between "ShKID" members and the "Chaldeans" abate. But there was something else ... We also read a lot with enthusiasm. Learned foreign languages. Wrote poems. There was a time when in our tiny republic of sixty people about sixty newspapers and magazines were released ... a museum existed. There was a theater where "Boris Godunov" and contemporary revolutionary plays were staged. None of this (or almost nothing) is depicted in the film. ... Life of ShKID on the screen looks poorer and rougher than it actually was.

But in Poloka's movie, unlike the original story, the protagonist became Vikniksor and the storyline shifted its focus to his hard struggle against the evil inclinations acquired by the teenagers on the street.

== Awards ==
- 1967 – Grand Prix at the festival of children's films in Moscow.
- 1968 – Second Prize for Best Children and Youth Film at the third All-Union Film Festival in Leningrad.
