= 713 Requests Permission to Land =

1962 film directed by Grigori Nikulin

- Directed by: Grigory Nikulin
- Written by: Alexey Leontyev
- Produced by: Ya. Rodin
- Starring: Vladimir Chestnokov; Otar Koberidze; Yefim Kopelyan
- Cinematography: Veniamin Levitin; Yuri Veksler
- Edited by: Alexandra Borovskaya
- Music by: Georgy Portnov
- Production company: Lenfilm
- Release date: 3 April 1962
- Running time: 78 minutes
- Country: USSR
- Language: Russian

713 Requests Permission to Land (Russian: 713-й просит посадку, romanized: 713 prosit posadku) is a 1962 Soviet disaster film. It was directed by Grigori Nikulin and filmed at Lenfilm studio.

The premiere took place on April 3, 1962.

== Synopsis ==
In an attempted political assassination, the crew of transatlantic flight 713 is poisoned by contaminated coffee, gradually rendering them unconscious, and leaving the plane to temporarily fly on autopilot. The passengers, however, remain oblivious. Soon the cockpit door is opened and the state of the crew is discovered and panic erupts. The aircraft begins losing altitude. A doctor, played by Vladimir Chestnokov, forces his way into the cockpit and regains control of the plane. Now he must guide the aircraft to a safe landing.

== Cast ==
- Vladimir Chestnokov as Richard Gunther, doctor-antifascist, hiding under the name of Philip Dubois
- Otar Koberidze as unemployed lawyer Henry, JD (voiced the role of Artyom Karapetyan)
- Lev Krugly as Jiri, journalist, and chronicler
- Lyudmila Abramova as Eva Priestley
- Nikolai Korn as secret service agent
- Yefim Kopelyan as salesman, pharmacist
- Lyudmila Shagalova as Teresa
- Joseph Konopatsky as missionary
- Vladimir Vysotsky as US Marine
- Sergey Golovanov as American
- Nina Agapova as American woman
- Nonna Ten as Vietnamese girl
- Vladimir Marev as crew commander
- Eve Kivi as stewardess

== Film distribution in USSR ==
In the Soviet box office in 1962, the film ranked 13th (27.9 million viewers).
