= Sergei Slonimsky =

Soviet composer (1932–2020)

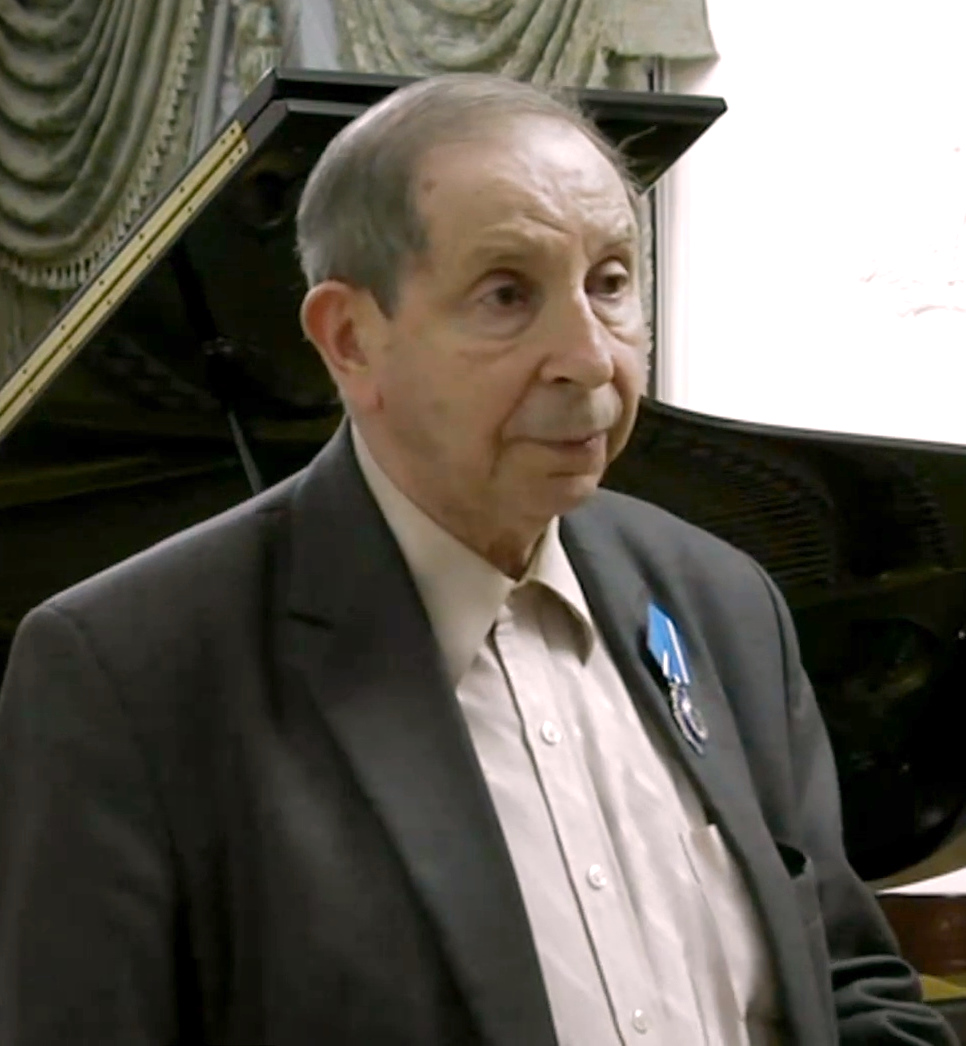
Sergei Slonimsky in October 2017

Sergei Mikhailovich Slonimsky (Russian: Серге́й Миха́йлович Слони́мский; 12 August 1932 – 9 February 2020) was a Russian and Soviet composer, pianist and musicologist.

== Biography ==
He was the son of the Soviet writer Mikhail Slonimsky and nephew of the Russian-American composer Nicolas Slonimsky. He studied at the Musical College in Moscow from 1943 until 1950. From 1950 Slonimsky was at the Leningrad Conservatory. He studied composition under Boris Arapov, Vissarion Shebalin and Orest Yevlakhov, polyphony under Nicolai Uspensky and piano under Anna Artobolevskaya, Samari Savshinsky and Vladimir Nielsen. Slonimsky was a professor at the St. Petersburg Conservatory. While the majority of his students were Russian, Slonimsky taught a large percentage of the international composition students at the Conservatory from countries including Colombia, Korea, China, Italy, Germany, Israel, Iran and the United States.

Among Slonimsky's notable students is Daniel Kidane.

Slonimsky died in Saint Petersburg on 9 February 2020 after a long illness.

== Music and style ==
Sergei Slonimsky composed more than a hundred pieces: 5 operas, 2 ballets, 34 symphonies and works in all genres of chamber, vocal, choral, theatre and cinema music, including Pesn' Volnitsy (The Songs of Freedom, for mezzo-soprano, baritone and symphony orchestra based on Russian folk songs, 1962), A Voice from the Chorus, a cantata set to poems by Alexander Blok, Concerto-Buffo, Piano Concerto (Jewish Rhapsody), Cello Concerto, 24 preludes and fugues, etc.

Mostly eclectic, he experimented with a folkloric style as well as with 12-tone techniques and new forms of notations. He also used forms and styles of jazz and neo-romantic music.

== Operas ==
- Virinea, an opera in 7 scenes. Libretto by S. Tsenin after the novel by Lidiia Seifullina (1967)
- Ioann the Terrible's vision Russian tragedy in 13 visions with 3 epilogues and overture. Libretto by Ya. Gordin after historical documents (1970)
- Tsar Iksion monodical drama after ancient myth and tragedy by Innokenty Annensky. Libretto by S. Slonimsky (1970) premiered January 31, 1981, Kuibyshev.
- Mary Stuart, a ballad opera in 3 acts. Libretto by Y. Gordin after the novel by Stefan Zweig (1980)
- Master and Margarita, a chamber opera in 3 acts. Libretto by Y. Dimitrin and V. Fialkovsky after the novel by Mikhail Bulgakov (1970), (1985) 25'
- Hamlet, dramma per musica in 3 acts. Libretto by Ya. Gordin and S. Slonimsky after Shakespeare's tragedy translated by Boris Pasternak, (1990)

== Ballets ==
- Ikarus, a ballet in 3 acts. Libretto by Y. Slonimsky after an ancient Greek myth (1971)
- Magic nut, ballet, libretto by Michael Shemjakin, 2005, premiere May 14, 2005, Mariinsky Theatre

== Selected filmography ==
- The Republic of ShKID (1966)
- The Mysterious Wall (1967)
- Summer Impressions of Planet Z (1986)
- Tomorrow Was the War (1987)
