= The Republic of ShKID =

1927 children's novel by Belych and Panteleev

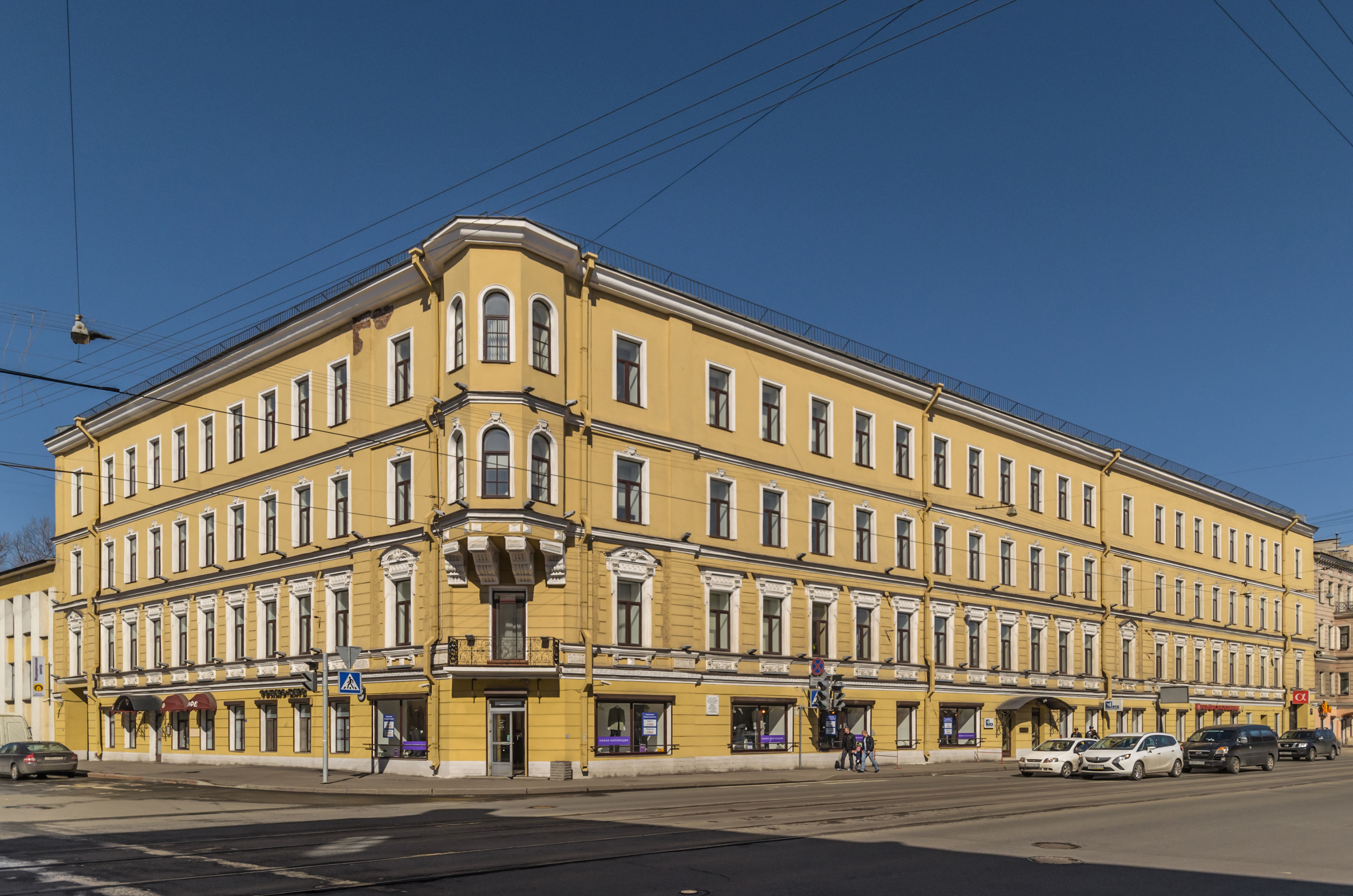
ShKID building, Leningrad

The Republic of ShKID (Russian: Республика ШКИД) is an adventure, partly autobiographical children's novel by L. Panteleyev and Grigori Belykh written in 1926 and printed in 1927.

The book is about the fate of Russian street boys (besprizorniks) who landed in the Fyodor Dostoyevsky School-Commune for Difficult Teenagers. "ШКИД" (ShKID) stands for Школа-коммуна имени Достоевского ("Dostoyevsky School-Commune ").

In 1966 Lenfilm produced a movie The Republic of ShKID based on the novel.

The novel was included into the 2013 list 100 Books for Schoolchildren recommended by the Ministry of Education and Science (Russia).
