= Vladimir Nazarov (composer) =

Russian composer

- Born: Vladimir Vasilievich Nazarov; February 24, 1952 (age 74); Novomoskovsk, Dnipropetrovsk Oblast, USSR
- Occupations: composer, director, filmmaker, singer, actor, teacher
- Years active: 1975–present

Vladimir Vasilievich Nazarov (Russian: Владимир Васильевич Назаров; born February 24, 1952) is a Russian composer, singer, actor, film director, artistic director of the Music Theatre of National Arts, Professor Gnessin State Musical College and R. Glier Kyiv Institute of Music. Honored Artist of the RSFSR (1987). People's Artist of Russia (2004).

Member of the Union of Theatre Workers of the Russian Federation and Union of Cinematographers the Russian Federation.

== Biography ==
Vladimir Nazarov was born February 24, 1952, in the town of Novomoskovsk Dnipropetrovsk region in the family chauffeur. His mother worked in a hospital. The future composer was the middle of three brothers. He graduated with honors from high school and music class school bayan (pedagogue Pyotr Martynovich Kostev)

Then he entered the Dnipropetrovsk cultural-educational school specialty Manager of the orchestra of folk instruments.

He graduated from the Moscow State Art and Cultural University

After serving in the Army, he moved to Moscow.

=== Career ===
Founder and director of the ensemble of Russian folk wind instruments Zhaleika (1975–1982), Ensemble of Folk Music (1982–2002) and the State Music Theater of National Art (2002).

Since 1984, Vladimir Nazarov participated in the creation of animation films.

In 1986, the folk music ensemble has participated in concerts for the liquidators of Chernobyl disaster.

In 1993, Vladimir Nazarov graduated from GITIS (Faculty Direction the stage). In 1998, Nazarov started his own singing career.

In February 2002, the State Ensemble of Folk Music acquires the building. Based State Music Theatre of National Arts under the direction of Vladimir Nazarov.

In 2004, Nazarov was given the title People's Artist of Russia.

In 2012, Vladimir became a member of the Council on Public Television of Russia. In 2015, he resigned from the Board due to the fact that, in his opinion, the OTP does not respond to topical issues in the country, but also because of the negative assessments of the Ukrainians by the Council Head Oleg Tabakov. Has criticized the policies of President Vladimir Putin with regard to Ukraine, Putins actions in Ukraine and Crimea in 2014. In March 2016 he wrote in an open letter to Putin (about Ukrainian pilot Nadiya Savchenko) "not even in my worst nightmares could I have imagined that I would have to ask you not to kill a woman".

In 2014 he retired as artistic director of the State Music Theatre of National Art because of disagreement with the results of the ministerial review. In August of the same year established an autonomous Musical Theatre of National Arts.
