= List of Soviet films of 1975 =

== 1975 ==
Title	Original title	Director	Cast	Genre	Notes
1975
Afonya	Афоня	Georgi Daneliya	Leonid Kuravlyov, Yevgeny Leonov, Yevgeniya Simonova	Comedy	
Anna Karenina	Анна Каренина	Margarita Pilikhina	Maya Plisetskaya	Ballet film	Screened at the 1975 Cannes Film Festival where it premiered out of competition.
At the World's Limit	На край света…	Rodion Nahapetov	Vera Glagoleva	Drama	
Bonus	Премия	Sergey Mikaelyan	Yevgeny Leonov, Vladimir Samojlov, Oleg Yankovsky, Mikhail Gluzsky, Armen Dzhigarkhanyan	Drama	
Captain Nemo	Капитан Немо	Vasily Levin	Vladislav Dvorzhetsky, Yuri Rodionov, Mikhail Kononov, Volodymyr Talashko	Science fiction	
The Captivating Star of Happiness	Звезда пленительного счастья	Vladimir Motyl	Igor Kostolevsky, Irina Kupchenko, Aleksey Batalov, Natalya Bondarchuk, Oleg Strizhenov	Drama, history	
The Arrows of Robin Hood	Стрелы Робин Гуда	Sergei Tarasov	Boris Khmelnitsky	Action	
Dersu Uzala	Дерсу Узала	Akira Kurosawa	Maxim Munzuk, Yury Solomin	Biopic, Adventure	USSR-Japan co-production, won the Golden Prize at Moscow
Diary of a School Director	Дневник директора школы	Boris Frumin	Oleg Borisov	Drama	
Eleven Hopes	Одиннадцать надежд	Viktor Sadovsky	Anatoly Papanov	Comedy	
The Flight of Mr. McKinley	Бегство мистера Мак-Кинли	Mikhail Schweitzer	Donatas Banionis, Zhanna Bolotova	Science fiction	
From Dawn Till Sunset	От зари до зари	Gavriil Egiazarov	Nikolai Pastukhov, Igor Ledogorov, Zhanna Prokhorenko, Lyubov Sokolova, Boris Ivanov	Drama	
Front Without Flanks	Фронт без флангов	Igor Gostev	Vyacheslav Tikhonov	Drama	
For Whole Remaining Life (TV)	На всю оставшуюся жизнь...	Petr Fomenko	Alexey Eybozhenko	War drama	Adaptation if Vera Panova novel The Train. 1976 Tbilisi TV Movie Festival Award
Hedgehog in the Fog	Ёжик в тумане	Yuriy Norshteyn	Alexei Batalov, Maria Vinogradova, Vyacheslav Nevinniy	Animation	
Hello, I'm Your Aunt!	Здравствуйте, я ваша тётя!	Viktor Titov	Aleksandr Kalyagin, Tamara Nosova, Tatyana Vedeneyeva, Valentin Gaft, Mikhail Lyubeznov, Oleg Shklovsky	Musical, comedy	
The Irony of Fate	Ирония судьбы, или С лёгким паром!	Eldar Ryazanov	Andrey Myagkov, Barbara Brylska, Yuri Yakovlev	Romantic Comedy	
It Can't Be!	Не может быть!	Leonid Gaidai	Mikhail Pugovkin, Nina Grebeshkova, Vyacheslav Nevinny, Mikhail Svetin, Oleg Dahl, Svetlana Kryuchkova, Michael Kokshenov	Comedy	
I Want the Floor	Прошу слова	Gleb Panfilov	Inna Churikova	Drama	
The Last Victim	Последняя жертва	Pyotr Todorovsky	Margarita Volodina	Drama	
The Lost Expedition	Пропавшая экспедиция	Venyamin Dorman	Viktor Sergachyov	Drama	
The Mirror	Зеркало	Andrei Tarkovsky	Margarita Terekhova, Ignat Daniltsev, Larisa Tarkovskaya, Alla Demidova, Anatoly Solonitsyn, Tamara Ogorodnikova	Drama	
New Year Adventures of Masha and Vitya	Новогодние приключения Маши и Вити	Igor Usov, Gennadi Kazansky	Natasha Simonova, Yura Nakhratov, Igor Efimov	Children's film, musical	
One Hundred Days After Childhood	Сто дней после детства	Sergei Solovyov	Boris Tokarev	Romance	
Other People's Letters	Чужие письма	Ilya Averbakh	Irina Kupchenko	Drama	
Rikki-Tikki-Tavi	Рикки-Тикки-Тави	Nana Kldiashvili and Aleksandr Zguridi	Igor Alekseyev	Family	
Step Forward	Шаг навстречу	Naum Birman	Lyudmila Gurchenko	Comedy	
Take Aim	Выбор цели	Igor Talankin	Sergei Bondarchuk	History, drama, biography	
Teens in the Universe	Отроки во вселенной	Richard Viktorov	Innokenti Smoktunovsky, Vasili Merkuryev, Lev Durov	Science fiction, comedy	
The Red Apple	Красное яблоко	Tolomush Okeyev	Gulsara Adzhibekova, Suimenkul Chokmorov	Drama	Entered into the 9th Moscow International Film Festival
They Fought for Their Country	Они сражались за Родину	Sergei Bondarchuk	Vasily Shukshin	War	
Town People	Горожане	Vladimir Rogovoy	Nikolay Kryuchkov	Drama	
Upright Magic	Честное волшебное	Yuri Pobedonostsev	I. Fominskaya	Family	
We Didn't Learn This	Это мы не проходили	Ilya Frez	Natalya Rychagova	Drama	
