= Deaths in March 1981 =

The following is a list of notable deaths in March 1981.

Entries for each day are listed alphabetically by surname. A typical entry lists information in the following sequence:

- Name, age, country of citizenship at birth, subsequent country of citizenship (if applicable), reason for notability, cause of death (if known), and reference.

== March 1981 ==
=== 2 ===
- Tony Gulotta, 77, American racing driver, he made thirteen starts in the Indy 500, with a best finish of third in 1927, his second start.

=== 3 ===
- William S. Burroughs Jr., 33, American novelist, he wrote two autobiographical novels, and was working on a third, the novels relate the experiences of a teenage runaway in the early 1960s, death by acute gastrointestinal hemorrhage, associated with micronodular cirrhosis
- Oleg Dal, 39, Soviet actor, his film credits included appearances in Zhenya, Zhenechka and Katyusha (as Zhenya Kolyshkin, 1967), Chronicles of a Dive Bomber (as Eugene Sobolevsky, 1967), An Old, Old Tale (as soldier and puppeteer, 1968), King Lear (as the Jester, 1970), The Land of Sannikov (as Yevgeny Krestovsky, 1974), It Can't Be! (as Barygin-Amursky, 1975), and The Suicide Club, or the Adventures of a Titled Person (as Prince Florizel, 1981, death by heart attack while sleeping in his hotel room in the city of Kiev

=== 4 ===
- Torin Thatcher, 76, Indian-born British actor from Bombay,cancer

=== 5 ===
- Brenda de Banzie, 71, British actress, she reportedly appeared in many films produced by the Rank Organisation, death due to post-surgery complications, following a brain surgery.
- Yip Harburg, 84, American lyricist and librettist, he wrote the lrics for all of the songs for the film The Wizard of Oz (1939), including Over the Rainbow, he championed racial, sexual, and gender equality and labor unionism, and he was an ardent critic of high society and religion, death due to a heart attack while driving, he had stopped at a red light at the time of his death.
- Paul Hörbiger, 86, Austrian actor,he portrayed the porter who "talks too much" in the British film noir The Third Man (1949);, as Hörbiger did not speak English at the time, he learned his lines phonetically.
- Red Saunders, 69, American jazz drummer and bandleader, in 1937, Saunders joined the house band at the Club DeLisa, and he eventually became its bandleader, he remained in control of the Club DeLisa house band, playing four to six shows nightly, until the club closed in 1958, he only had a relatively brief hiatus between 1945 and 1947, when he led a smaller band at other venues in both Chicago and Indianapolis.
- Totti Truman Taylor, 65, British actress,in 1953, she portrayed Aunt Sally in the children's television series Worzel Gummidge Turns Detective.

=== 6 ===
- George Geary, 87, English first-class cricketer, primarily a bowler, he took 46 wickets in 14 Tests.
- Garry Marsh, 78, English actor,he started off in films as a leading man, but he later became a character actor, playing self-important roles, during World War II he served as a flying officer in the Royal Air Force (RAF).

=== 7 ===
- Peter Birch, Irish cleric, he served as the Bishop of Ossory from 1964 until his death in 1981, he was reportedly an unpopular figure in the Irish hierarchy, supporting the progressive ideals of the Second Vatican Council (1962-1965) and calling for improvements in the living conditions of rural women, going against the social conservatism of his fellow clerics.
- Bosley Crowther, 75, American journalist, writer, and film critic for The New York Times, he was the film critic for the Times until he semi-retired in 1967 and became the critic emeritus,following his semi-retirement, he was employed by the film studio Columbia Pictures, tasked with identifying stories and films to buy, heart failure
- Kirill Kondrashin, 67, Russian conductor, in the first International Tchaikovsky Competition in 1958, Kondrashin was the conductor for American pianist Van Cliburn, who won the first prize,; following the competition, Kondrashin toured the United States with Cliburn, being the first Soviet conductor to visit the United States since the beginning of the Cold War.
- Red Pollard, 71, Canadian horse racing jockey, he was hired in 1936 by the horse trainer Tom Smith to ride Charles S. Howard's horse, Seabiscuit, he continued to ride into the 1950s, mostly in New England,; following his retirement as a jockey, he became a jockey's valet at Narragansett Park in Rhode Island.
- Hilde Krahwinkel Sperling, 72, German-Danish tennis player, according to A. Wallis Myers and John Olliff of The Daily Telegraph and the Daily Mail, Sperling was ranked in the world top 10 from 1930 through 1939 (no rankings issued from 1940 through 1945), reaching a career high of world no. 2 in these rankings in 1936, in recognition of her winning the French Championships three times, being a Wimbledon finalist twice, reaching the semifinals of the French Championships and Wimbledon an additional six times, and being ranked in the top 10 for 10 consecutive years, Sperling was posthumously inducted into the International Tennis Hall of Fame in 2013.

=== 9 ===
- Max Delbrück, 74, German-American biophysicist, in 1935, he published a collaboration with Nikolay Timofeev-Ressovsky and Karl Zimmer, the major work Über die Natur der Genmutation und der Genstruktur which was considered to be a major advance in understanding the nature of gene mutation and gene structure, the work was a keystone in the formation of molecular genetics.

=== 13 ===
- Robin Maugham, 64, British novelist, travel writer, playwright, and biographer, he was the son and heir of Frederic Maugham, 1st Viscount Maugham, but he was reportedly "unashamedly homosexual", he never married, and the viscountcy became extinct upon his death, he died from a pulmonary embolism, compounded by long-standing diabetes mellitus

=== 14 ===
- Ken Barrington, 50, English international cricketer, he was regarded as the backbone of the England team during the 1960s, always best in a crisis, he was reputedly appreciated overseas more than he was at home, winning widespread admiration in Australia and hero-worship in India, death by heart attack. An ambulance was summoned at his location, but he died before its arrival.
- Eleanor Perry, 66, American screenwriter and author, she was an advocate for women's rights and screenwriters' recognition, often criticizing the film industry, cancer

=== 15 ===
- René Clair, 82, French filmmaker and writer, as the author of all of his own scripts, who also paid close attention to every aspect of the making of a film, including the editing, Clair was one of the first French filmmakers to establish for himself the full role of an auteur,his first four sound films in the early 1930s portrayed an affectionate and idealized view of working class life, and they established a popular romantic image of Paris
- Derek Roy, 58, English comedian,he made his first stage appearance at the age of 14, in 1946, he became the resident comedian on the BBC radio show Variety Bandbox, sharing the role on alternate weeks with Frankie Howerd, with whom he developed a friendly rivalry, he remained popular through the 1950s and the 1960s, especially in the Midlands, he made several successful tours of South Africa, cancer

=== 17 ===
- Paul Dean, 68, American Major League Baseball right-handed pitcher, he was nicknamed "Daffy" by the press, in contrast to his quiet and serious demeanor, heart attack
- Dorothy Dwan, 74, American actress and columnist for Photoplay, she portrayed Dorothy Gale in the fantasy adventure film The Wizard of Oz (1925), lung cancer

=== 18 ===
- Cahide Sonku, 68, Yemeni-born Turkish film director, actress, model, and writer, she was the first female film director in Turkey

=== 19 ===
- Frank Lane, 86, American sports executive, primarily associated with professional baseball, he variously served as the general manager in Major League Baseball for the Chicago White Sox, the St. Louis Cardinals, the Cleveland Indians, the Kansas City Athletics and the Milwaukee Brewers for over fifteen seasons between 1948 and 1972.

=== 20 ===
- Gerry Bertier, 27, Amerivan high school football player and Paralympian, having recovered from a car accident in 1971, he decided to occupy himself in Wheelchair Track and Field, the Wheelchair Basketball League, and the United States Paralympics, setting state and national records, mortally injured in a second car accident, caused by a drunk driver
- Edith Schultze-Westrum, 76, German actress, she portrayed Mrs. Hudson in the mystery film Sherlock Holmes and the Deadly Necklace (1962).

=== 22 ===
- Jumbo Elliott, 65, American track and field coach.
- John S. McCain Jr., 70, American admiral, in April 1968, at the height of the Vietnam War, he was named by then-President Lyndon Johnson as the commander in chief of the United States Pacific Command, stationed in Honolulu, while also serving as the commander of all American forces in the Vietnam theater, McCain played an important part in the expansion of the American involvement in Cambodia, death by heart attack while traveling aboard a military aircraft.His son attributed McCain's long-term health problems to the admiral's many years of habitual binge drinking.

=== 23 ===
- Claude Auchinleck, 96, English military officer, he was a commander of the British Indian Army and a veteran of both world wars, following the see-saw of Allied and Axis successes and reverses in North Africa, Auchinleck was appointed to succeed General Sir Archibald Wavell as Commander-in-Chief Middle East Command in July 1941;when the Partition of India was effected in August 1947, Auchinleck was appointed Supreme Commander of all British forces remaining in both India and Pakistan, he remained in this role until the winding up and closure of the Supreme H.Q. at the end of November 1947, this marked his effective retirement from the army
- Mike Hailwood, 40, British racing driver and motorcycle road racer, he initially left Formula One after being injured badly at the 1974 German Grand Prix at the Nürburgring, he retired to New Zealand, where he was involved with a marine engineering business, death due to fatal injuries from a car accident, when his executive car collided with a lorry which made an illegal turn through the barriers. Hailwood died two days following the accident.
- Beatrice Tinsley, 40, British-born New Zealand astronomer and cosmologist, in 1974 she received the American Astronomical Society's Annie J. Cannon Award in Astronomy, awarded for "outstanding research and promise for future research by a postdoctoral woman researcher", in recognition of her work on galaxy evolution, in 1978, she became the first female professor of astronomy at Yale University, melanoma

=== 26 ===
- C. D. Darlington, 77, English biologist, cytologist, geneticist, and eugenicist, he discovered the mechanics of chromosomal crossover,he was listed by the Southern Poverty Law Center as an example of a prominent race scientist who espoused antisemitism, eugenics, racism, and social Darwinism.

=== 27 ===
- Mao Dun, 84, Chinese novelist, journalist, playwright, and literary critic, he served as Mao Zedong's secretary and Culture Minister from 1949 until 1965,the female characters in his early literary works were primarily examples of the New Woman concept, but he then shifted to depicting female characters within traditionalist Chinese families, having no individual names or identities

=== 29 ===
- Frank Tieri, 77, Italian-American mobster, he served as the front boss of the Genovese crime family from 1975 until 1980, in 1981, he became the first Mafia boss to be convicted under the new RICO Act, he died due to an unspecified "long illness"
- Eric Williams, 69, Trinidad and Tobago politician and historian, he served as the first prime minister of Trinidad and Tobago from 1962 until his death in 1981,as a historian, he is primarily known for the book Capitalism and Slavery (1944) which covers the economic history of sugar and slavery into the 19th century and discusses the decline of the Caribbean sugar plantations from 1823 until the emancipation of the slaves in the 1830s,; the book also notes the British government's use of the equalisation of the sugar duties acts in the 1840s, to reduce protectionism for sugar from the British West Indian colonies, and to promote free trade in sugar from Cuba and Brazil, where it was cheaper.

=== 30 ===
- Sherman Edwards, 61, American composer, jazz pianist, and songwriter, he wrote the score for the children’s musical Who’s Afraid of Mother Goose? (1967), with lyrics by Ruth Batchelor, this one-hour show was broadcast on ABC-TV, heart attack
- Douglas Lowe, 78, British Olympic Games champion, in the 1924 Summer Olympics in Paris, he won the 800 metres gold medal in a new European record time of 1:52.4.,in the 1928 Summer Olympics in Amsterdam, he won the 800 metres in a personal best performance of 1:51.8, a full second and eight yards ahead of a world class field,; he also anchored the British 4×400 metres relay team that finished 5th.

=== 31 ===
- Enid Bagnold, 91, British playwright, novelist, and memoirist, her own biography, written by Anne Sebba and published in 1987, revealed some of the more problematic and contradictory aspects of Bagnold's life: her literary feuds, her marriage, her approach to motherhood, her pro-Nazi beliefs during the interwar period, her morphine addiction, and her contempt for the many leading actors who appeared in her plays, death by bronchopneumonia
- Hank Henry, 74, American comedian, he got his start in American burlesque, and he was the comic foil to the straight man Robert Alda when they performed as a duo, cancer.

== Sources ==
- Arlott, John (1986). John Arlott's 100 Greatest Batsmen. MacDonald Queen Anne Press. ISBN 978-0-356-12365-3.
- Arnold, Peter (1985). The Illustrated Encyclopaedia of World of Cricket. W.H. Smith. ISBN 978-1-85435-322-1.
- Heathcote, Tony (1999). The British Field Marshals 1736–1997. Barnsley (UK): Pen & Sword. ISBN 0-85052-696-5.
- Mackenzie, Compton (1951). Eastern Epic. Chatto & Windus, London. ASIN B0011DPGZ4.
- McCain, John; Salter, Mark (2002). Worth the Fighting For. New York: Random House. ISBN 0-375-50542-3.
- Peel, Mark (1992). England Expects, A biography of Ken Barrington. The Kingswood Press. ISBN 978-0-413-66370-2.
- Sebba, Anne (1987). Enid Bagnold: A Biography. Taplinger. ISBN 978-0-8008-2453-2.
- Shawcross, William (1979). Sideshow: Kissinger, Nixon, and the Destruction of Cambodia (paperback). Pocket Books. ISBN 0-671-83525-4.
- Warner, Philip (1982) [1981]. Auchinleck. The Lonely Soldier. London: Sphere Books. ISBN 0-7221-8905-2.
