= Pavel Morozenko =

Soviet actor, stage actor and film actor (1939–1991)

- Born: Pavel Semyonovich Morozenko; 5 July 1939; Snizhne, Ukrainian SSR, USSR
- Died: 14 July 1991 (aged 52); Rostov Region, RSFSR, USSR
- Occupation: Actor
- Years active: 1960–1991
- Spouse: Anna Mikhailovna Morozenko
- Children: Andrey Pavlovich Morozenko

Pavel Semyonovich Morozenko (Russian: Павел Семёнович Морозенко; Ukrainian: Павло Семенович Морозенко; Pavlo Semenovych Morozenko; 5 July 1939, in Snizhne, Ukrainian SSR – 14 July 1991, in Rostov Region, RSFSR) was a Soviet theatre and film actor, Merited artist of the Ukrainian SSR (1973).

== Biography ==
Pavel Morozenko was born on 5 July 1939 in Snizhne, Ukraine, Soviet Union.

In 1960 he graduated from the National University of theatre, cinema and television of Karpenko-Kary. In the same year made his debut in cinema played the main male role in the military melodrama directed by Vladimir Denisenko «Roman and Francesca» (on the basis of the plot a touching love story of a Soviet sailor Roman and Italian a simple girl Francesca will the fate of separated The Great Patriotic War). The shooting took place in the city of Sochi – the magnificent landscapes of the Southern town, a great game of actors (the main female role was played by the popular Soviet actress Ludmila Gurchenko, this film is very fond of the Soviet audience). In 1967 Pavel starred in one of the main roles in the film done by Vladimir Motyl Zhenya, Zhenechka and Katyusha. This picture brought the actors who starred great fame (the film also starred Oleg Dahl, Galina Figlovskaya, Mikhail Kokshenov, a popular Soviet singer Mark Bernes).

During 31 years of his creative career Pavel Morozenko starred in more than 30 films, the collaborated with the theater: Kiev Ivan Franko Academic Theater, Nikolayev Vasily Chkalov Russian Drama Theater, Rostov-on-Don Maxim Gorky Drama Theater, Kiev theatre of drama and comedy on the Left Bank of Dnieper, Moscow Vladimir Mayakovsky Academic Theater.

In 1973, the actor was awarded the title of Honored artist of the Ukrainian SSR. Also actively worked behind the scenes over the voice-over in Russian language of Soviet and foreign films − Of the most famous works, dubbing the film «Blood Brothers / Blutsbrüder», a production of the East German film studio DEFA. Morozenko dubbed the main character in the film, played by Gojko Mitić. Among foreign works of films: «Favorite Raja / Raja Jani» Production of India, duplicate the character in the performance of the actor Premnath; «Two Strangers / Do Anjaane» Production of India, duplicate the character in the performance of the actor Abhi Bhattacharya; «All and Nobody / Wszyscy i nikt» Production of PRP, duplicate the main character in the performance of the actor Emil Karewicz; «Destination (Sorry, Aruna!) / Manzil» Production of India, duplicate the character in the performance of the actor Shreeram Lagoo; «Your love / Hum Tere Ashiq Hain» Production of India, duplicate the character in the performance of the actor Om Shivpuri; «Aszparuh / Аспарух: 681 – Величието на хана» Production of PRB, duplicate the main character in the performance of the actor Stoyko Peev.

Morozenko died on 14 July 1991 when he drowned in Don River.

== Filmography ==
- 1960 – «Roman and Francesca / Роман и Франческа» – sailor Roman
- 1961 – «Years girls / Годы девичьи» – Alexey
- 1962 – «The Law of Antarctica / Закон Антарктиды» – Nikolai Shvorkin
- 1962 – «Wedding of Svichka / Свадьба Свички» – the overseer
- 1963 – «Meet Baluyev! / Знакомьтесь, Балуев!» – Vasily Marchenko
- 1965 – «Over us Southern cross / Над нами Южный крест» – Fedor Boyko
- 1966 – «Mediocre / Бесталанная» – Gnat
- 1966 – «Why smiled at the stars / Почему улыбались звёзды» – student Yuriy
- 1967 – «Zhenya, Zhenechka and Katyusha» / Женя, Женечка и «Катюша» – sergeant of the Red Army Alexey Zyrianov
- 1967 – «The Tenth step / Десятый шаг» – commissar of the Red Army Osip Dzuyba
- 1967 – «Not destined / Не суждено» – Dmitry Kovban
- 1968 – «Someone else's house / Чужой дом» – Fedor
- 1968 – «In the early Sunday potion collected / В воскресенье рано зелье собирала»
- 1968 – «Introduction / Интродукция» – Lisenko
- 1968 – «Love and dollars / Любовь и доллары»
- 1970 – «The Unexpected love / Нечаянная любовь» – sailor Alexey Kontsevoi
- 1980 – «Take everything on myself / Берём всё на себя» – admiral of the Red Army
- 1981 – «The Last game / Последний гейм» – leader of band
- 1981 – «The Tankodrome / Танкодром» – colonel tank troops of the Soviet Army Fomin
- 1982 – «Tenderness to roaring beast / Нежность к ревущему зверю» – general of the Soviet Army Savely Petrovich Dobrotvorski
- 1983 – «The Price of the return / Цена возврата» – Sergey
- 1985 – «Such a strange night in the narrow family circle / Такой странный вечер в узком семейном кругу» – forest ranger
- 1986 – «Oncoming lane band / Встречная полоса» – judge
- 1988 – «And the light shines in the darkness / И свет во тьме светит» – joiner Jakob
- 1988 – «The Investigation leads Znatoki. Without knives and brass knuckles / Следствие ведут Знатоки. Без ножа и кастета» – general of the Soviet Militsiya
- 1989 – «Women who were lucky / Женщины, которым повезло» – Eduard Matveevich Kutepov
- 1990 – «Ten years without the right of correspondence / Zehn Jahre ohne das Recht der Korrespondenz / Десять лет без права переписки» (Co-Production FRG–USSR) – the father of Mikhail
- 1990 – «Tomorrow was the war / Завтра была война» – the representative of the district Committee
- 1990 – «The War in the Western direction / Война на Западном направлении» – general of the Red Army Konstantin Ivanovich Rakutin

== Recognition and awards ==
- Honored artist of the Ukrainian SSR (1973)
- State Prize RSFSR name of Stanislavski (1976)
- Medal "In Commemoration of the 1500th Anniversary of Kiev" (1982) − for significant contribution to Socio-cultural development of Kiev (1982)

== Links ==
- Pavel Morozenko at IMDb
- Pavel Morozenko on the site «Kino-Teatr.ru» (in Russian)
- Pavel Morozenko on the site «RUSKINO.ru» (in Russian)
- Pavel Morozenko on the site »Rusactors.ru» (in Russian)
- Pavel Morozenko on the site «Bestactors.ru» (in Russian)
- Pavel Morozenko on the site «Kino-Search (Kinopoisk.ru)» (in Russian)
- Pavel Morozenko on the site of Rostov-on-Don Maxim Gorky Academic Drama Theater (in Russian)
- Pavel Morozenko on the site of Moscow Vladimir Mayakovsky Academic Theater (in Russian)
