= Bulat Okudzhava =

Soviet-Russian singer (1924–1997)

Bulat Okudzhava Булат Окуджава
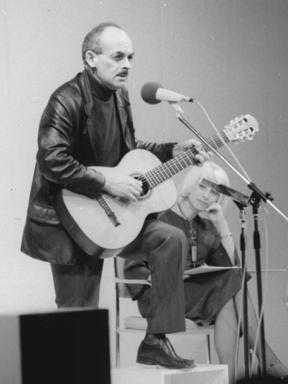
- Okudzhava performing at Palace of the Republic, East Berlin, East Germany, 1976

Background information
- Born: Bulat Shalvovich Okudzhava; May 9, 1924; Moscow, Soviet Union
- Origin: Soviet Union
- Died: June 12, 1997 (aged 73) Clamart, France
- Genre: Author song
- Occupations: Musician, poet, editor, novelist, short story writer
- Instruments: Vocals, guitar
- Years active: 1946–1997

Bulat Shalvovich Okudzhava (Russian: Була́т Ша́лвович Окуджа́ва; Georgian: ბულატ ოკუჯავა; Armenian: Բուլատ Օկուջավա; May 9, 1924 – June 12, 1997) was a Soviet and Russian poet, writer, musician, novelist, and singer-songwriter of Georgian-Armenian ancestry. He was one of the founders of the Soviet genre called "author song" (авторская песня, avtorskaya pesnya), or "guitar song", and the author of about 200 songs, set to his own poetry. His songs are a mixture of Russian poetic and folk song traditions and the French chansonnier style represented by such contemporaries of Okudzhava as Georges Brassens. Though his songs were never overtly political, the freshness and independence of Okudzhava's artistic voice presented a subtle challenge to Soviet cultural authorities, who were thus hesitant for many years to give him official recognition.

== Life ==
Bulat Okudzhava was born in Moscow on May 9, 1924, into a family of communists who had come from Tbilisi, the capital of Georgia, to study and to work for the Communist Party. The son of a Georgian father, Shalva Okudzhava, and an Armenian mother, Ashkhen Nalbandyan, Bulat Okudzhava spoke and wrote only in Russian.

Okudzhava's mother was the niece of a well-known Armenian poet, Vahan Terian. His father served as a political commissar during the Civil War and as a high-ranking Communist Party member thereafter, under the protection of Sergo Ordzhonikidze (1886-1937). His uncle Vladimir Okudzhava was an anarchist and terrorist who left the Russian Empire after a failed attempt to assassinate the Kutaisi governor. Vladimir was listed among the passengers of the infamous sealed train that delivered Vladimir Lenin, Grigory Zinoviev and other revolutionary leaders from Switzerland to Russia in 1917.

=== Terror and war ===
Shalva, Okudzhava's father, was arrested in February 1937 during the Great Purge, accused of Trotskyism and wrecking. He was shot on 4 August, along with his two brothers. His wife was arrested in 1939 "for anti-Soviet deeds" and sent to the Gulag. Bulat returned to Tbilisi to live with his relatives. His mother was released in 1946, but arrested for the second time in 1949, spending another 5 years in labor camps. She was fully released in 1954 and rehabilitated in 1956, along with her husband.

In 1942, at the age of 17, 9th-grader Bulat Okudzhava volunteered for the Red Army infantry, and from 1942 he participated in the war against Nazi Germany. After his discharge from the service in 1944, he returned to Tbilisi where he passed his high school graduation exams and enrolled at Tbilisi State University, graduating in 1950. After graduating, he worked as a teacher, first in a rural school in the village of Shamordino in the Kaluga Region, and later in the city of Kaluga itself.

=== Return to Moscow ===
In 1956, three years after the death of Joseph Stalin, Okudzhava returned to Moscow. Following his parents' rehabilitation and the 20th Party Congress at which Khrushchev denounced Stalin, Bulat Okudzhava was able to join the Communist Party, of which he remained a member until 1990. In the Soviet capital he worked first as an editor in the publishing house Molodaya Gvardiya (Young Guard), and later as the head of the poetry division at the most prominent national literary weekly in the former USSR, Literaturnaya Gazeta ("Literary Newspaper"). It was then, in the middle of the 1950s, that he began to compose songs and to perform them, accompanying himself on a Russian guitar.

Soon he was giving concerts. He only employed a few chords and had no formal training in music, but he possessed an exceptional melodic gift, and the intelligent lyrics of his songs blended perfectly with his music and his voice. His songs were praised by his friends, and amateur recordings were made. These unofficial recordings were widely copied as magnitizdat, and spread across the USSR and Poland, where other young people picked up guitars and started singing the songs for themselves. In 1970, his lyrics appeared in the classic Soviet film White Sun of the Desert.

Georgian Song (1967)
- Bulat Okudzhava singing
- Georgian Song on YouTube

=== Songwriter, poet and novelist ===
Though Okudzhava's songs were not published by any official media organization until the late 1970s, they quickly achieved enormous popularity, especially among the intelligentsia – mainly in the USSR at first, but soon among Russian-speakers in other countries as well. Vladimir Nabokov, for example, cited his Sentimental March in the novel Ada or Ardor.

Okudzhava, however, regarded himself primarily as a poet and claimed that his musical recordings were insignificant. During the 1980s, he also published a great deal of prose (his novel The Show is Over won him the Russian Booker Prize in 1994). By the 1980s, recordings of Okudzhava performing his songs finally began to be officially released in the Soviet Union, and many volumes of his poetry were also published. In 1991, he was awarded the USSR State Prize. He supported the reform movement in the USSR and in October 1993, signed the Letter of Forty-Two.

Okudzhava died in Paris on June 12, 1997, and is buried in the Vagankovo Cemetery in Moscow. A monument marks the building at 43 Arbat Street where he lived. His dacha in Peredelkino is now a museum that is open to the public.

A minor planet, 3149 Okudzhava, discovered by Czech astronomer Zdeňka Vávrová in 1981 is named after him. His songs remain very popular and frequently performed.

== Music ==
Okudzhava, like most bards, did not come from a musical background. He learned basic guitar skills with the help of some friends. He also knew how to play basic chords on a piano.

Okudzhava tuned his Russian guitar to the "Russian tuning" of D'-G'-C-D-g-b-d' (thickest to thinnest string), and often lowered it by one or two tones to better accommodate his voice. He played in a classical manner, usually finger picking the strings in an ascending/descending arpeggio or waltz pattern, with an alternating bass line picked by the thumb.

Initially Okudzhava was taught three basic chords, and towards the end of his life he claimed to know a total of seven.

Many of Okudzhava's songs are in the key of C minor (with downtuning B♭ or A minor), centering on the C minor chord (X00X011, thickest to thinnest string), then progressing to a G 7 (00X0433), then either an E♭ minor (X55X566) or C major (55X5555). In addition to the aforementioned chords, the E♭ major chord (X55X567) was often featured in songs in a major key, usually C major (with downtuning B♭ or A major).

By the nineties, Okudzhava adopted the increasingly popular six string guitar but retained the Russian tuning, subtracting the fourth string, which was convenient to his style of playing.

== Fiction in English translation ==
- "The Art of Needles and Sins", (story), from The New Soviet Fiction, Abbeville Press, NY, 1989.
- "Good-bye, Schoolboy!" and "Promoxys", (stories), from Fifty Years of Russian Prose, Volume 2, M.I.T Press, MA, 1971.
- The Extraordinary Adventures of Secret Agent Shipov in Pursuit of Count Leo Tolstoy, in the year 1862, (novel), Abelard-Schuman, UK, 1973, translated by Heather Maisner.
- Nocturne: From the Notes of Lt. Amiran Amilakhvari, Retired, (novel), Harper and Row, NY, 1978.
- A Taste of Liberty, (novel), Ardis Publishers, 1986.
- "Girl of My Dreams", (story), from 50 Writers: An Anthology of 20th Century Russian Short Stories, Academic Studies Press, 2011.

== Selected discography ==
- Wonderful waltz, 1969
- While the Earth is still turning, 1994
- And when the first love comes... (А как первая любовь), 1997
- Piosenki (Songs), Polish edition, 2000
- Green lantern, On Smolensk road, Main song, Record on stone, and Your Honor – records made during last years of his life

== Selected filmography ==
Year	Title	Original title		
Year	Title	Original title	Lyrics	Other
1961	My Friend, Kolka!	Друг мой, Колька!	Merry Drummer; Over Sea, Over Land	
1962	Chain reaction	Цепная реакция	Last Trolleybus; Old Pier	actor (bus passenger)
1964	I Am Twenty	Мне двадцать лет	Sentimental March	cameo (as himself)
1965	Faithfulness	Верность		screenplay
1966	July Rain	Июльский дождь	A Song About Infantry	music
1967	Zhenya, Zhenechka and Katyusha	Женя, Женечка и «катюша»	Danish King's Elixir	screenplay, vocal, cameo (soldier)
1970	White Sun of the Desert	Белое солнце пустыни	Your Honor, Lady Luck	
1970	Belorussian Station	Белорусский вокзал	We Need Only One Victory	music
1974	The Straw Hat	Соломенная шляпка	all songs	
1975	The Captivating Star of Happiness	Звезда пленительного счастья	romances	cameo (bandmaster)
1975	The Adventures of Buratino	Приключения Буратино	Lamplighters; Papa Carlo; Karabas Barabas (two songs); About Greed-Guts; The Field of Wonders; Pierrot's Serenade	
1976	The Key That Should Not Be Handed On	Ключ без права передачи	Let's Exclaim	cameo (as himself)
1976	The Strogovs	Строговы		actor (officer)
1977	One-Two, Soldiers Were Going...	Аты-баты, шли солдаты...	Take the Greatcoat, Let's Go Home	
1979	The Wife Has Left	Жена ушла	One More Romance	vocal
1982	The Pokrovsky Gate	Покровские ворота	Sentries of Love; Painters; Ditty About Arbat	vocal
1984	Dear, Dearest, Beloved, Unique...	Милый, дорогой, любимый, единственный...	One Wishes to Get Rich	vocal
1985	Legal Marriage	Законный брак	This Woman in the Window; The Skies are Freer After the Rain	actor (train passenger)
1986	Guard Me, My Talisman	Храни меня, мой талисман	One Can't Return the Past; Family Photo Against Pushkin	cameo (as himself)
2000	Still Waters	Тихие омуты	Youth Ends Quickly	music
2005	The Turkish Gambit	Турецкий гамбит	Autumn Rain	
