= Zhenya, Zhenechka and Katyusha =

1967 Soviet comedy-drama war film

Zhenya, Zhenechka and "Katyusha"
- Directed by: Vladimir Motyl
- Written by: Bulat Okudzhava; Vladimir Motyl
- Starring: Oleg Dal; Galina Figlovskaya
- Cinematography: Konstantin Ryzhov
- Music by: Isaac Schwartz
- Production company: Lenfilm
- Release date: 1967
- Running time: 81 minutes
- Country: Soviet Union
- Language: Russian

Zhenya, Zhenechka and "Katyusha" (Russian: Женя, Женечка и «Катюша», romanized: Zhenya, Zhenechka i "Katyusha") is a 1967 Soviet war comedy-drama film directed by Vladimir Motyl.

The film is set during the Great Patriotic War and tells about the romance between an intelligent young man, Evgeny «Zhenya» Kolyshkin, who is a guards soldier, and the communications officer Evgeniya «Zhenechka» Zemlyanikina.

== Plot ==
Guards Private Evgeniy Kolyshkin (Oleg Dal), a young intellectual from Moscow, returns to the frontlines after recovering in a hospital during the Great Patriotic War. Immersed in a world of books and fantasies, Kolyshkin finds it difficult to adapt to the harsh realities of war. His dreamy and naive nature often leads to comical misunderstandings and blunders, much to the frustration of his unit commander, Guards Lieutenant Romadin (Georgy Shtil). Despite his well-meaning efforts, Kolyshkin's behavior frequently results in headaches for Romadin, who tries to manage the challenges of commanding amidst the chaos of war. The young private's idealism, however, sets him apart from his more pragmatic comrades, making him both endearing and exasperating to those around him.

One day, Kolyshkin crosses paths with Evgeniya Zemlyanikina (Galina Figlovskaya), a no-nonsense liaison officer in a regiment of Katyushas. Zemlyanikina, with her stern demeanor and focus on duty, initially regards Kolyshkin as little more than a bumbling, inexperienced boy. She often teases him, finding his awkward attempts to impress her amusing. Over time, however, Zemlyanikina begins to see a different side of Kolyshkin—his genuine kindness, unwavering optimism, and gentle heart. As the two grow closer, they develop a tender, mutual affection that offers a brief respite from the horrors of war. When Zemlyanikina is transferred to the divisional headquarters, Kolyshkin later reunites with her in Berlin, in a house being used as the division's base of operations. Their joy at seeing each other leads to a playful game of hide-and-seek, a fleeting moment of happiness amidst the turmoil of war.

However, tragedy strikes when Zemlyanikina encounters an armed German soldier in the house. Startled and frightened, the soldier shoots and kills her before fleeing. Overcome with grief and anger, Kolyshkin pursues and kills the man, but his sorrow cannot be assuaged. As the war comes to an end, Kolyshkin and his unit celebrate Victory Day near the Reichstag, but the atmosphere is bittersweet. The loss of Zemlyanikina weighs heavily on Kolyshkin, who now carries a quiet, somber demeanor. His comrades, recognizing his pain, try to honor Zemlyanikina's memory in small ways, such as inscribing a memorial on a wall. Kolyshkin, once full of romantic ideals and youthful exuberance, stands apart from the celebration, silently weeping as he mourns the woman he loved and the innocence he has lost.

== Cast ==
=== Leading roles ===
- Oleg Dal as Evgeniy (Zhenya) Kolyshkin, Private Guard
- Galina Figlovskaya as Evgeniya (Zhenechka) Zemlyanikina, junior sergeant of the Guards, communications officer of the regiment
- Mikhail Kokshenov as Zahar Kosykh, Lance Corporal of the Guards
- Pavel Morozenko as Alexey Zyryanov, senior sergeant of the Guards
- George Shtil as Romadin, lieutenant (later captain) of the Guards
- Mark Bernes as Karavaev, Colonel of the Guard (voiced by Gregory Gaius)
- Adolf Ilyin as division commander (voiced by Yefim Kopelyan)
- Bernd Schneider as Siegfried

=== Episodic roles ===
- Nelly Ilyina-Gutsol as passenger in the car
- Tatyana Ignatova as laughing girl
- Vladimir Ilyin as fellow soldier Kolyshkin
- Lyubov Malinovskaya as mistress of the hut
- Igor Mikhailov as the captain
- Nikolay Marton is a German officer
- Vladimir Musatov as German officer
- Boris Polynitsyn as episode
- Alexander Ulyanov as episode
- V. Fedorov as episode
- B. Yantz as episode
- Bulat Okudzhava as military man at the New Year's Eve

== Production ==
=== Script ===
Vladimir Motyl came up with the idea for the script after reading the story of Bulat Okudzhava "Good health, schoolboy!". The humor and plot of the story led Motyl to the idea of a plot about an intellectual schoolboy who finds himself at war and is finding himself ill-equipped. The director's idea was that there would be a romance that could even turn into a tragedy through the fault of the protagonist in order to remind the spectator of the war. Having about 25 sheets of the screenplay, Motyl went to Leningrad to meet with Bulat Okudzhava. He initially refused, saying that the script is already complete and his participation is not needed, but Motyl managed to persuade the poet to become a co-author. Unlike the young director, Bulat Okudzhava was a veteran of the Great Patriotic War and contributed small but important details to the script, dialogues and images that were inaccessible to Motyl. For example, the dialogue for the scene, when Zahar Kosykh overhears Zhenya and Zhenechka talking on the phone and takes it at his own expense, was completely written by Okudzhava. In turn, the decision to kill Zemlyanikina was taken by Motyl during filming: thus the director wanted to show the tragedy of the war.

Many real facts were portrayed were also portrayed in the script. The story of a Soviet soldier getting lost with a parcel and spending the New Year with the Germans was borrowed from front-line newspapers. Unlike Zhenya Kolyshkin, the soldier concealed that he was in the enemy's quarters, and this was only discovered by the end of the war. The scene in the Baltic, where Zemlyanikina and Kolyshkin get separated by a few steps and end up failing to meet, came to the director from a personal tragedy experienced in childhood.

Mosfilm rejected the finished script. According to Vladimir Motyl, the film did not meet the instructions of the party and government, as well as the Main Political Administration of the Army. Then Motyl turned to Lenfilm, where he got consent to the shooting. However, after a while the script was again declined and the order of the directorate was completely closed for the same reasons as at Mosfilm. An additional barrier was Bulat Okudzhava's participation in the writing of the script, which, according to Motyl, was "under suspicion," since he did not submit to anyone, and his books were severely criticized by the press.

The filming process was set in motion by chance. The picture "The Children of Pamir" by Motyl was nominated for the Lenin Prize, but during the discussion Philip Ermash, deputy head of the Culture Department of the CPSU Central Committee, made a speech that it would be wrong to give the award, as Mirshakar, author of the poem that formed the basis of the script, already had The Stalin Prize. Yermash also gave slanderous statements about Vladimir Motyl about which he later found out. Having threatened an official with a complaint to the CPSU Central Committee, Motyl has obtained permission to shoot "Zhenya, Zhenechka ...".

=== Cast ===
For the film Motyl immediately planned to engage Oleg Dahl along with other candidates. The director liked Dahl for his roles in the theater Sovremennik, and despite having little physical resemblance to the character, he was found to be suitable because of his personality. From the first meeting the actor surprised the director, by coming dressed in a bright crimson jacket. Despite lacking in popularity and having a scarce number of proposals at that time, Dahl was very independent and condescendingly agreed to participate in the film. Dahl almost lost his role by failing the first and second tests because of his alcohol dependence and Lenfilm was against his approval precisely for these reasons. Motyl, who saw in Dahl a "sniper choice for the role of Kolyshkin," persuaded Dahl to pass the screening tests in a sober state, and the third time Oleg passed brilliantly. Subsequently, Dahl confessed to Motyl that having been expelled from all theaters for the disruption of performances, he suffered greatly without work, and Kolyshkin's role became a "salvation" for him.

During work on the script, both authors confessed to each other that in their youth they were scrawny and ungainly and fell in love with strong and powerful girls who talked to them in a highly mocking manner. In this regard, the image of Zhenechka Zemlyanikina in the imagination of Vladimir Motyl was formed in advance: the director was looking for a charming and attractive woman, "a little rough in appearance". Contrary to the point of view of the leaders of Lenfilm who insisted on the nomination of Natalya Kustinskaya, Motyl considered the actress "infinitely distant" from the front-line soldier conceived by him, since "there was no organic coarseness of the belligerent communications officer". After much searching, the director found Galina Figlovskaya through the supervisors of the Shchukin school, who helped with the search among the talented but little-known recent graduates. At that time, Figlovskaya did not work on the stage and it was not easy to find her. According to the memoirs of Motyl, the institution where Galina Viktorovna worked was closed, and the director managed to find her only thanks to the help of her acquaintances. Many crew members sympathized with the actress, and Dahl, unlike his timid character, in every possible way teased Figlovskaya, calling her a "Fig".

Mikhail Kokshenov definitely got into the character of Zahar Kosyh the first time. The 102-kilogram actor, for whom costumers had to alter gymnast and riding breeches, looked like the opposite of sensible Dahl, but despite this contrast they became friends during the filming. Also Kokshenov partly acted as the editor of his role: the actor liked to go to the pubs and listen to people talk, which allowed him to create the image of his character. Later, Mikhail Kokshenov said that he often used the character of a brazen commoner in everyday situations, and Bulat Okudzhava gave the actor a book with the inscription: "To Misha Kokshenov, a well-disguised intellectual". Vladimir Motyl jokingly characterized the actor, saying: "One hundred and three kilos and not a single thought in the eyes - civilization has passed by".

Mark Bernes was attracted to the role of a "Colonel, similar to the actor Mark Bernes from Odessa"; Germans were played by students of the Leningrad University from the GDR.

=== Music ===
The main musical theme of the film - "The Danish King's Drops" - was written for the poem of Bulat Okudzhava by composer Isaak Schwartz, who later worked many times with Vladimir Motyl, for example, in the films White Sun of the Desert (1970) and The Captivating Star of Happiness (1975). Subsequently, Schwartz said that before work began he was very worried, as he was afraid to make mistakes when working with Okudzhava. After acquainting himself with the material for the film, the composer wrote a song beginning with vigorous notes and by the end turned it into a sad melody. Okudzhava was very pleased with the resulting work, and he decided to perform it himself. In the duet with Okudzhava this song was sung by Alexander Kavalerov, who played in the film the episodic role of soldier.

=== Filming ===
Filming took place mainly in Kaliningrad and the Kaliningrad Oblast, some episodes were shot in Vsevolozhsk, Leningrad Oblast. The director tried not to focus on the battle scenes, considering it more important to penetrate into the inner world of the characters. The missile units that took part in the film, were used in a limited way because of their secrecy. By order of the command, the cars moved to the given square and after shooting the scenes they moved back to classified positions.

In between the shooting, Oleg Dahl, Pavel Morozenko and Mikhail Kokshenov walked around the city in military uniforms of the 1943 model, as a result of which the local population often took them for conscripted soldiers. During one of the campaigns to the market, the actors drank and went to rest on the bank of the Pregolya River. When seeing the yellow rocket signaling the beginning of the shooting, the actors ignored the signal, for which Vladimir Motyl "punished" them, forcing many times to "duplicate" the take, without saying that the camera was off all the time. Quite often there were other funny events: Dahl and Kokshenov, who used to drive the Willys MB in a complete outfit (including automatic weapons), repeatedly attracted the attention of the military patrol. The military actors answered the questions, calling non-existent and absurd troops, such as "Separate part of the railway fleet" or "Sea cavalry". Once Kokshenov simulated a pursuit of Dahl by screaming and shooting in the air, as a result of which the locals who decided to help almost hurt the "fugitive".

During the shooting, there was also an incident related to alcohol: Oleg Dahl was rude to a hotel attendant and was arrested for fifteen days "for hooliganism". Motyl came to an agreement with the chief of the department, and in the morning the actor was escorted under supervision to the set, and in the evening he was again taken to the "serve time". Gentle conversation of Zhenya Kolyshkin on the phone with Zhenechka while sitting in the military prison was filmed at this time.

== Release ==
A difficult fate awaited the picture: the film was recognized as "harmful", which was the reason for the director's first ban on the profession. The press was full of harsh and insulting comments, the film was shown "underground", at clubs and outskirts cinemas, but it had a considerable resonance with the viewer. The picture came to the wide screen only thanks to the sailors of the Baltic and Northern fleets, among whom Bulat Okudzhava's songs were popular. Vladimir Motyl visited the presentation of the film in Severomorsk and Murmansk and, having received the enthusiastic approval of the staff, appealed to the admirals to write an official review about the film. They readily responded. After collecting a lot of such reviews, Motyl sent a telegram to Alexei Kosygin, chairman of the Council of Ministers of the Soviet Union, who, though indifferent to the film, regarded it as a profitable product that would attract a large number of spectators.

The official film premiere of the film in the USSR was held on August 21, 1967. The audience of the picture consisted of more than 24.5 million moviegoers.

Despite success with the public, the film seriously slowed down the career of its creator, who became practically blacklisted as director. According to the memoirs of Motyl, for forty years of working in the cinema, he put out only one film in four or five years, since the film authorities, as a rule did not give green-light to his script submissions. For example, his application for the film "Comet, My Destiny" about Ivan Annenkov was rejected, although later this theme was realized in the film The Captivating Star of Happiness (1975).

A tragic fate awaited many actors: Mark Bernes died two years after the premiere, Oleg Dahl died at the age of 39, Galina Figlovskaya was seriously ill in the following years and died of a severe polyarthritis attack, Pavel Morozenko (who played Alexei Zyryanov) drowned at the age of 52 years.
