= Isaak Shvarts =

Isaak Shvarts may refer to:

- Isaac Schwartz (1923–2009), Soviet composer
- Isaac Izrailevich Schwartz (1879–1951), director of the Ukrainian Cheka and member of the Communist Party of Ukraine
