= Chronicles of a Dive Bomber =

1967 film

- Directed by: Naum Birman
- Written by: Vladimir Kunin; Naum Birman
- Produced by: Igor Lebed
- Starring: Lev Vainshtein; Aleksandr Grave; Oleg Dahl
- Cinematography: Aleksandr Chirov
- Edited by: Maria Pen
- Music by: Alexander Kolker
- Production company: Lenfilm
- Release date: 1967
- Running time: 74 min.
- Country: Soviet Union
- Language: Russian

Chronicles of a Dive Bomber (Russian: Хроника пикирующего бомбардировщика, romanized: Khronika pikiruyuschego bombardirovschika) is a 1967 Soviet war film directed by Naum Birman based on the novel of the same name by Vladimir Kunin about the everyday life of frontline aviation during the Great Patriotic War.

== Plot ==
The Great Patriotic War is taking place but it is quiet at the front airfield of the bombers — there is fog, therefore the planes are stationary. The command poses the task of finding and photographing an enemy airfield on which Focke-Wulf fighters are based. The crew of a young but experienced junior lieutenant Chervonenko flies to the task. Before flying out he learns from the report of the Soviet Information Bureau that his native town of Pinsk has been liberated.

Enterprising and inventive shooter-radio operator Zhenya Sobolevsky (Oleg Dahl) from the crew of Arkhiptsev (Gennady Saifulin) from the military trade shop brings raspberry syrup and antifreeze from the hydraulic system of the aircraft and prepares the "Chassis liqueur". Crews of aircraft celebrate the liberation of Pinsk with the prepared "liqueur", but then comes the news that Chervonenko is coming to the landing across the start. Chervonenko is killed, his navigator lands the plane (Leonid Reutov). Chervonenko manages to photograph the enemy airfield, but it turns out to be false.

In the evening, in the dining room, the captain of the medical service (Heliy Sysoev) is verbally abusive to the girlfriend of the navigator (Lev Weinstein) which leads to the commander and the navigator throwing him out of the dining room, and he in turn threatens to write a report. The whole crew of Arkhiptsev is put in the guardhouse, commander and navigator for punching the head of the medical unit, and the shooter for producing the "liqueur".

The command once again decides to conduct reconnaissance of the airfield, for this the experienced crew of Arhiptsev is most suitable, and they are prematurely released from the guardhouse. During the first departure, Arkhiptsev also discovers a false airfield, and again several bombers attack the bomber. Sobolevsky knocks down one fighter. The crew hardly leaves the pursuit of enemy fighters, imitating when diving, that they were shot down.

To complete the task, they need to fly again. Arkhiptsev wants to test his assumption that the airfield is near the railway station. The entire air regiment is waiting for messages from Arkhiptsev about the coordinates of the airfield, in order to fly out of it to bomb. Arkhiptsev is looking for an airfield, but again five enemy fighters attack him from ambushes. Arkhiptsev uses up all his ammunition, Sobolevsky is killed. The fighters surround the plane and want to force him to board their airfield. Having understood the enemy's plan, Arhiptsev together with the navigator make the decision to ram the fighter planes standing on the ground.

== Cast ==
- Lev Vainshtein as Veniamin Gurevich, navigator of the crew of Arhiptsev
- Aleksandr Grave as Ivan Alekseevich, commander of the regiment
- Oleg Dal as Yevgeny Sobolevsky, the shooter—radio operator of the crew of Arhiptsev
- Igor Efimov as regiment deputy
- Viktor Ilichyov as ordinary mechanic Osadchy (voiced by Leonid Bykov)
- German Kolushkin as Gribov; performs on the accordion "Song of the Four Ivanov"
- George Korolchuk as Chervonenko
- Leonid Reutov as Pastukhov
- Gennady Saifulin as Sergei Arkhiptsev, commander of the crew
- Elena Sanko as Katya
- Konstantin Sorokin as seller of the military
- Heliy Sysoev as chief medical officer of the regiment
- Yuri Tolubeyev as mechanic Kuzmichev
- Nikolay Trofimov as major, commandant of the airfield
- Pyotr Shcherbakov as Chief of Staff of the Regiment
- Boris Arakelov as gunsmith
- Arkady Vovsi as grandfather of Gurevich, shoemaker
