= We Looked in the Death's Face =

- Russian: Мы смерти смотрели в лицо
- Directed by: Naum Birman
- Written by: Yuri Yakovlev
- Starring: Oleg Dahl; Lyubov Malinovskaya; Larisa Tolkachyova; Yuri Zhukov; Boris Naumov
- Cinematography: Genrikh Marandzhyan
- Music by: Vladimir Deshov
- Release date: 1980
- Country: Soviet Union
- Language: Russian

We Looked in the Death's Face (Russian: Мы смерти смотрели в лицо) is a 1980 Soviet drama film directed by Naum Birman.

== Plot ==
The film takes place in March 1942. Lieutenant Obrant received the task of organizing a dance group. He found his former students and went with them to the Leningrad Front, where they held their first concert.

== Cast ==
- Oleg Dahl
- Lyubov Malinovskaya
- Larisa Tolkachyova
- Yuri Zhukov
- Boris Naumov
- Olga Kuznetsova
- Yuliya Slezkinskaya
- Aleksandr Dovgalyov
- Aleksandr Zenkevich
- Igor Kustov
