= Forest (1980 film) =

1980 film

- Russian: Лес
- Directed by: Vladimir Motyl
- Written by: Vladimir Motyl; Aleksandr Ostrovskiy
- Starring: Lyudmila Tselikovskaya; Boris Plotnikov; Vyacheslav Kirilichev; Stanislav Sadalskiy; Elena Borzova
- Cinematography: Vladimir Ilin
- Music by: Aleksandr Zhurbin
- Release date: 1980
- Running time: 97 minute
- Country: Soviet Union
- Language: Russian

Forest (Russian: Лес) is a 1980 Soviet comedy-drama film based on Alexander Ostrovsky's comedy directed by Vladimir Motyl.

== Plot ==
The film tells about the elderly lady Gurmyzhskaya, who lives in the province. Suddenly, a nephew comes to her and Gurmyzhskaya begins to flirt with him.

== Cast ==
- Lyudmila Tselikovskaya as Gurmyzhskaya
- Boris Plotnikov as Gennadiy Neschastlivtzev
- Vyacheslav Kirilichev
- Stanislav Sadalskiy
- Elena Borzova
- Aleksandr Solovyov
- Mikhail Pugovkin
- Kira Kreylis-Petrova
- Viktor Tsepaev
- Yuriy Chernitsky
