= A Teacher of Singing =

- Russian: Учитель пения
- Directed by: Naum Birman
- Written by: Emil Braginskiy
- Starring: Andrei Popov; Irina Alfyorova; Igor Bogdanov; Nikolay Boyarskiy; Aleksandr Demyanenko
- Cinematography: Yevgeni Mezentsev
- Music by: Venyamin Basner
- Release date: 1972
- Country: Soviet Union
- Language: Russian

A Teacher of Singing (Russian: Учитель пения) is a 1972 Soviet musical comedy film directed by Naum Birman.

== Plot ==
The film tells about the fun and witty Efrem Nikolayevich Solomatin, who wants to open a music school in which he will cultivate in his students a love not only for music, but also for life and the world around him.

== Cast ==
- Andrei Popov as The teacher of singing
- Irina Alfyorova as The teacher's daughter
- Igor Bogdanov
- Nikolay Boyarskiy as Cameo
- Aleksandr Demyanenko
- Yevgeny Yevstigneev
- Lyudmila Ivanova
- Konstantin Koshkin
- Yevgeniya Sabelnikova
- Natalya Sayko
