= Town People =

- Russian: Горожане
- Directed by: Vladimir Rogovoy
- Written by: Vladimir Kunin
- Starring: Nikolay Kryuchkov; Marina Dyuzheva; Mikhail Vaskov; Aleksey Mironov; Boris Chirkov
- Cinematography: Inna Zarafyan
- Edited by: Svetlana Desnitskaya; Olga Katusheva
- Music by: Rafail Khozak
- Release date: 1975
- Country: Soviet Union
- Language: Russian

Town People (Russian: Горожане, romanized: Gorozhane) is a 1975 Soviet romantic drama film directed by Vladimir Rogovoy.

== Plot ==
The film tells about a good and decent taxi driver who meets new people every day. Some people bring him joy, others bring problems.

== Cast ==
- Nikolay Kryuchkov as taxi driver
- Marina Dyuzheva as Masha (as Mariyka Kukushkina)
- Mikhail Vaskov as Yura
- Aleksey Mironov as Fofanov
- Boris Chirkov
- Lyudmila Khityaeva
- Oleg Dahl
- Georgiy Yumatov
- Larisa Udovichenko
- Iren Azer
