= Black and White Magic =

- Russian: Магия чёрная и белая
- Directed by: Naum Birman
- Written by: Valeriy Priyomykhov
- Starring: Pavel Plisov; Anton Granat; Margarita Ivanova; Aleksandr Lenkov; Marianna Kazyonnaya
- Cinematography: Genrikh Marandzhyan
- Edited by: Tamara Lipartiya
- Music by: Aleksandr Zhurbin
- Release date: 1983
- Country: Soviet Union
- Language: Russian

Black and White Magic (Russian: Магия чёрная и белая) is a 1983 Soviet comedy film directed by Naum Birman. The film tells the story of two inseparable schoolboys who navigate friendship, mischief, and self-discovery as they reluctantly befriend a new girl and learn that true passion lies not in hobbies but in loyalty to each other.

== Plot ==
Two schoolboys, Seva "Kitchen" Kukhtin and Vitya "Screw" Elkhov, are best friends and sit together in the same class. But one day, a new student, Elvira Sabonite, joins their class, along with a new homeroom teacher, Valentin Dmitrievich, known to the students as "Mitya." Mitya places Elvira at Vitya’s desk, separating the boys and causing them to resent the newcomer from the Baltic region. Mitya tries to engage the class by suggesting a summer hiking trip to untouched wilderness, sparking excitement among the students—especially Seva and Vitya. However, as the school year ends, their poor academic performance, with Seva struggling in math and Vitya failing a dictation, threatens their participation in the trip. During a class discussion, Elvira suggests that the boys’ lack of interest in learning comes from having no real hobbies. She proposes that if they don't improve their grades, they should be excluded from the trip. Though her health prevents her from joining, she agrees to help Seva and Vitya find a passion. Elvira introduces them to various hobbies, from music to stamp collecting, but nothing captures their interest.

Their classmate Bryandya changes things when he gives them a magic trick book instead of Treasure Island. The boys become fascinated by magic tricks and entertain their classmates. At the market, Vitya demonstrates the "Tomato Disappearance" trick to a tomato vendor, who misunderstands and accuses them of theft, resulting in the boys being taken to the police station. To avoid trouble, they claim they’re from a distant village, Vozzhayevka. The officer puts them on a train, but after realizing how far it is, they jump off midway. They seek help at a nearby station, contacting Elvira’s father, who works as a railway official, to arrange their return home, where they face their parents’ anger. Disillusioned with hobbies, they decide to give up, even if it means missing the trip. Unexpectedly, Mitya allows them to join, explaining that their friendship itself is the most valuable hobby. Seva and Vitya are thrilled but ultimately decide to support Elvira by staying in the city with her. Mitya commends their selfless choice.

== Cast ==
- Pavel Plisov
- Anton Granat
- Margarita Ivanova
- Alexander Lenkov
- Marianna Kazyonnaya
- Denis Levin
- Aleksandr Sukhanov
- Natalya Popova
- Andrei Puzanov
- Nikolay Volkov
