= Igor Dmitriev =

Soviet and Russian actor (1927–2008)

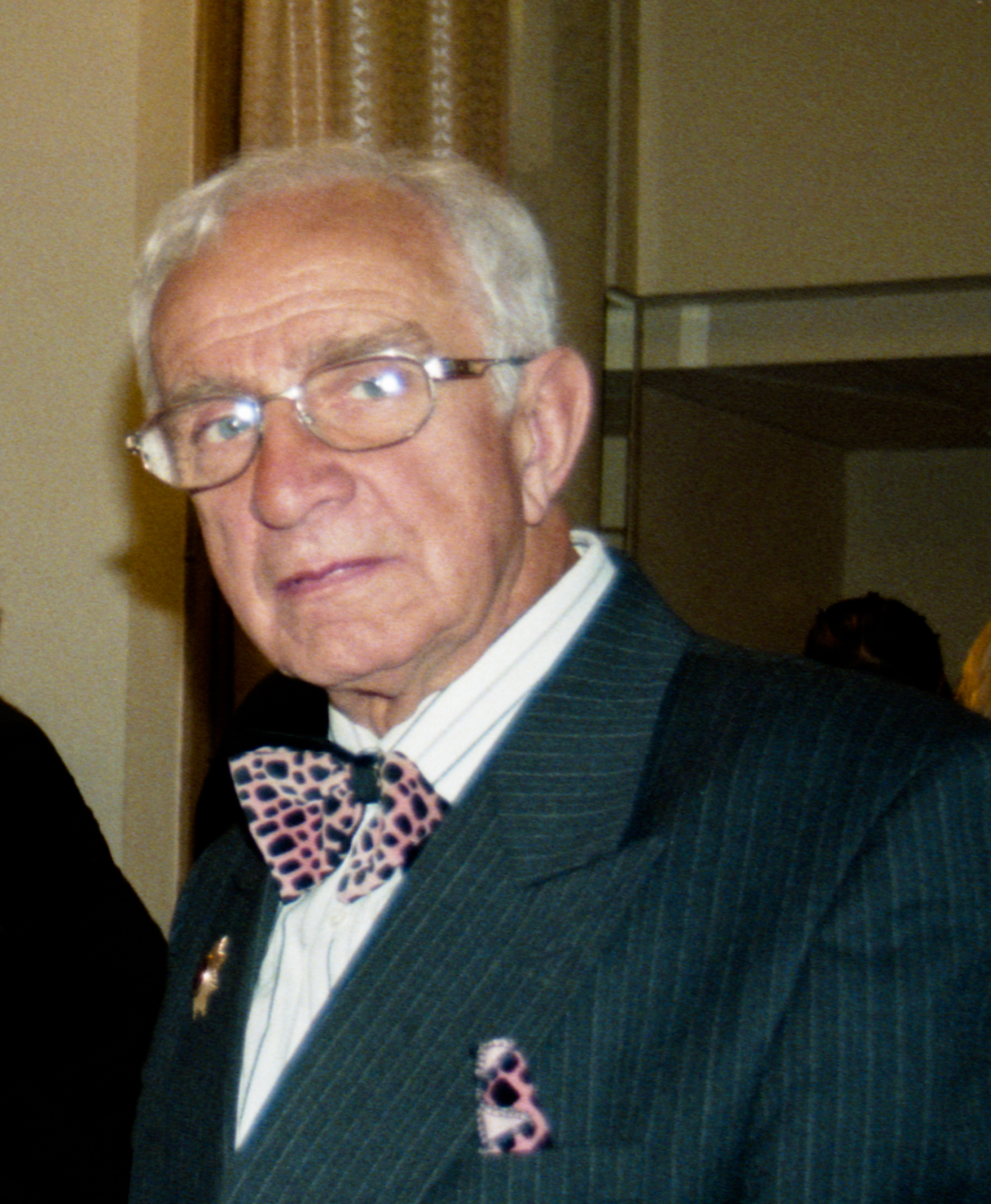
- Born: 29 May 1927; Leningrad, Russian SFSR, Soviet Union (now Saint Petersburg, Russia)
- Died: 26 January 2008 (aged 80); Saint Petersburg, Russia
- Occupation: Actor
- Years active: 1948—2008

Igor Borisovich Dmitriev (Russian: И́горь Бори́сович Дми́триев) (29 May 1927 – 26 January 2008) was a Soviet and Russian film and theatre actor who specialized in playing aristocratic characters in costume productions (e.g., Rosencrantz in Grigori Kozintsev's Hamlet).

Igor Dmitriev was born in Leningrad to parents Boris Petrovich Dmitriev, a professional yachtsman and Elena Tauber, a ballerina. In 1948 he graduated from the Studio of the Moscow Art Theatre and in 1949 became an actor of the Vera Komissarzhevskaya Theater of Drama in Leningrad. From 1967 to 1984 he worked at Lenfilm. In 1984 he started working at the Nikolay Akimov Theater of Comedy. Dmitriev worked with Georgi Tovstonogov, Sergei Gerasimov, Yan Frid. He acted in more than 120 films, not only in the Soviet Union, but also in Hungary, Poland, East Germany, the United States, Morocco and Algeria.

He became People's Artist of the RSFSR in 1988. In 2000 he played the benefit performance in the play of George Bernard Shaw and Jerome Kilty Dear Liar: A Comedy of Letters. He also worked as a radio narrator, being one of the first actors to do so, he recited the novels of Leo Tolstoy, Theodore Dreiser, Guy de Maupassant, Émile Zola, Anton Chekhov and many others.

== Selected filmography ==
- Ivan Pavlov (1950) as student
- She Loves You (1956) as Anatoly Pylnikov
- And Quiet Flows the Don (1957–1958) as Evgeny Listnitsky
- In the Days of October (1958) as Alexander Blok
- Under the Knock of the Wheels (1958) as Vasily Kovalsky
- Virgin Soil Upturned (1960) as Lyatyevsky
- Black Gull (1962) as wounded
- Kain XVIII (1963) as General
- Hamlet (Гамлет, 1964) as Rosencrantz
- Speckle (1965) as Igor Borisovich
- Green Coach (1967) as Nikolai Osipovich Dyur
- Nikolay Bauman (1967) as Vasily Kachalov
- No Password Needed (1967) as lieutenant Mordvinov
- An Old, Old Tale (1968) as prince
- Lyubov Yarovaya (1970) as Elysatov
- Franz Liszt. Dreams of love (1970) as prince Nikolay Petrovich Wittgenstein
- Dauria (1971) as esaul Solomonov
- Goya or the Hard Way to Enlightenment (1972) as Duke of Alba
- Farewell to St. Petersburg (1972) as Grand Duke Konstantin
- The Captivating Star of Happiness (1975) as Ludwig Lebsteltern
- Trust (1976) as Vladimir Bonch-Bruyevich
- The Blue Bird (1976) as Pleasure to Beloved Himself
- Golden Mine (1977) as Dr. Podneix
- The Dog in the Manger (1978) as Count Federico
- A Glass of Water (1979) as Marquis de Torcy
- Die Fledermaus (1979) as Frank, director of the prison
- Sherlock Holmes and Dr. Watson (1979) as Inspector Gregson
- The Suicide Club, or the Adventures of a Titled Person (1981) as Colonel Geraldine
- The Pokrovsky Gate (1982) as Gleb Orlovich
- Magistral (Russian: Магистраль) as Passender Igor
- Return from Orbit (1983) as Kuznetsov's fellow traveler on the train
- Crazy Day of Engineer Barkasov (1983) as Krutetsky
- Anna Pavlova (1983-1986) as Léon Bakst
- The Hobbit (1985) as Gollum
- The Mountains are Smoking (1988) as Baron von Steinberg
- A Bright Personality (1989) as Bernardov
- Cyrano de Bergerac (1989) as Monflery
- Musketeers Twenty Years After (1992) as François de Vendôme, Duc de Beaufort
- Beautiful Stranger (1992) as retired military
- Tartuffe (1992) as Cleanthes
- Streets of Broken Lights (1999) as director
- Give Me Moonlight (2001) as Eduard Sorokin
