= Roksana Babajan =

Soviet/Russian pop singer (born 1946)

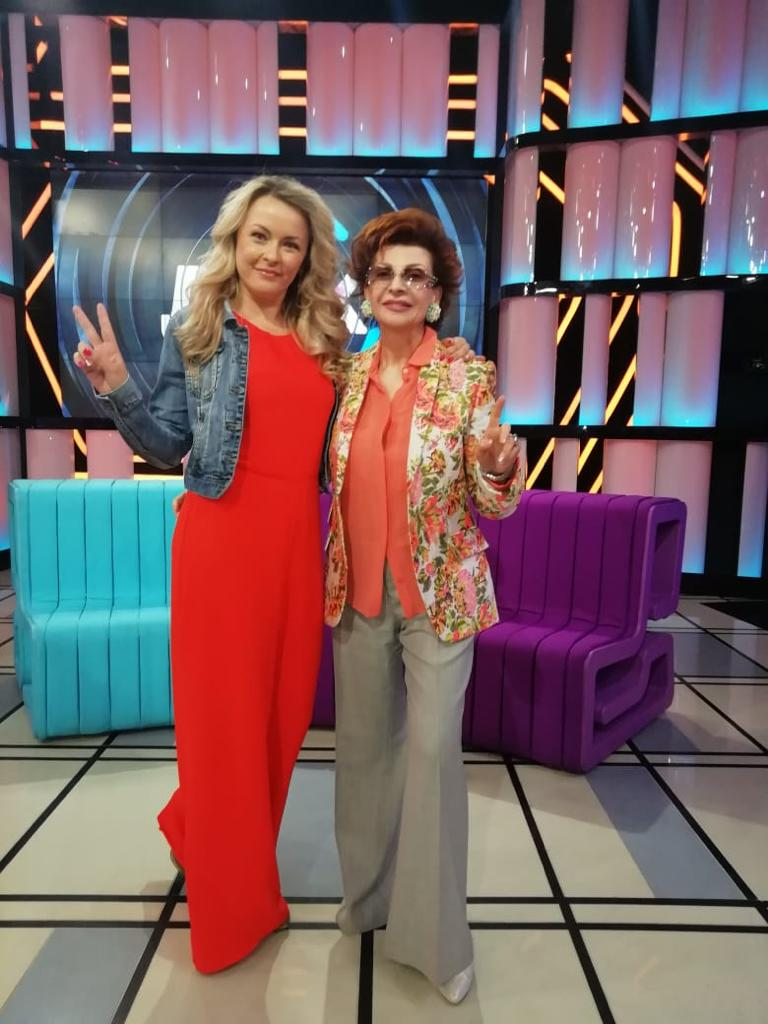
- ← Yulia Arinicheva and Roksana Babajan →

Background information
- Born: Roksana Rubenovna Babajan; 30 May 1946 (age 80); Tashkent, Uzbek SSR, Soviet Union
- Genres: Music of the Soviet Union, pop
- Occupations: Singer, actress
- Years active: 1973–present

Roksana Rubenovna Babajan (Armenian: Ռոքսանա Ռուբենի Բաբայան, Russian: Рокса́на Рубе́новна Бабая́н; born 30 May 1946, Tashkent, Uzbek SSR, USSR) is a Soviet Armenian and Russian pop singer and actress. People's Artist of the Russian Federation (1999). Active participant in the protection of homeless animals, President of the Russian League for the Protection of Animals.

The widow of People's Artist of the RSFSR Mikhail Derzhavin (1936–2018), she officially bears his surname, but performs under her mother's surname.

== Biography ==
Roksana Babajan was born on 30 May 1946 in Tashkent in the family of engineer Ruben Mikhailovich Mukurdumov and singer and pianist Seda Grigorievna Babajan.

In 1970 she graduated from the Tashkent Institute of Railway Transport Engineers, Faculty of Industrial and Civil Engineering (ASG). Studying at the institute, she participated in amateur performances, taking prizes at singing competitions. In the year graduating from the university, the head of the State Variety Orchestra of Armenia, People's Artist of the USSR Konstantin Orbelyan invited Roksana to her orchestra, to Yerevan, where she later became a professional singer. Since 1973 (according to other sources since 1975) Roxana becomes a soloist of the VIA Blue Guitars.

The turning point in the career was the participation in the International Festival of Internationales Schlagerfestival Dresden on 16–19 September 1976 in the East Germany. Despite the very strong composition of the contestants and the constant sympathy of the German jury to their performers from the GDR (in 9 of the 17 festivals they were the winnersу), Babajan was able to win.

In 1983 she graduated from the administrative and economic faculty of the GITIS.

A new period of popularity came from the late 1980s, when Babayan annually appeared in the finals of the festival Pesnya Goda from 1988 to 1996.

The widow of People's Artist of the RSFSR Mikhail Derzhavin (1936–2018), with whom he was married since 1980.

Member of the Russian political party United Russia.

== Discography ==
- 2014 — Formula of Happiness (CD)
- 1996 — Enchantment Witchcraft (CD)
- 1991 — Another Woman (Vinyl)
- 1984 — When We Are Together (Vinyl)

== Awards ==
- January 8, 1999 — honorary title "People's Artist of the Russian Federation" (for great services in the field of art).
