= The Sunday Daddy =

- Russian: Воскресный папа
- Directed by: Naum Birman
- Written by: Eduard Akopov
- Starring: Dmitriy Grankin; Yuriy Duvanov; Tamara Akulova; Galina Polskikh; Boris Shcherbakov
- Cinematography: Genrikh Marandzhyan
- Music by: Venyamin Basner
- Release date: 1985
- Running time: 85 minute
- Country: Soviet Union
- Language: Russian

The Sunday Daddy (Russian: Воскресный папа) is a 1985 Soviet children's drama film directed by Naum Birman.

== Plot ==
The film tells about a boy whose parents divorced. And now he can see his father only on Sundays, but he does everything he can to keep his parents together again.

== Cast ==
- Dmitriy Grankin
- Yuriy Duvanov
- Tamara Akulova
- Galina Polskikh
- Boris Shcherbakov
- Vera Glagoleva
- Anna Nakhapetova
- Mikhail Kokshenov
- Anton Granat
