= Decembrists' women =

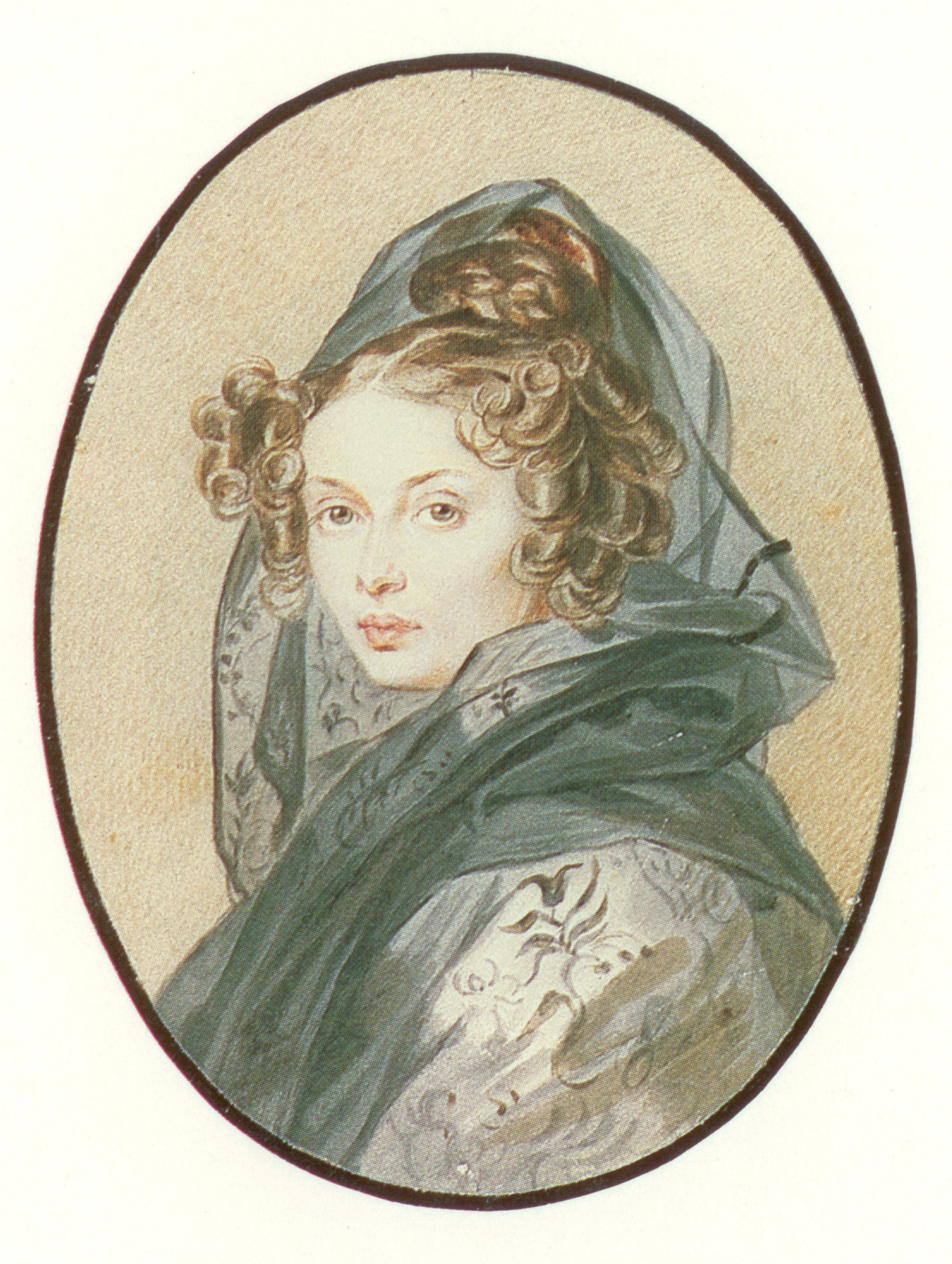
Alexandra Muravyova

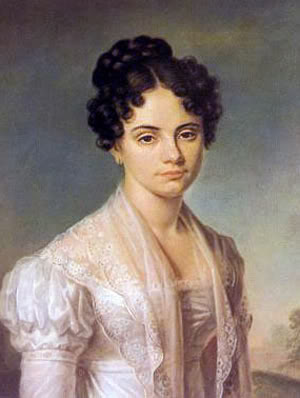
Maria Volkonskaya

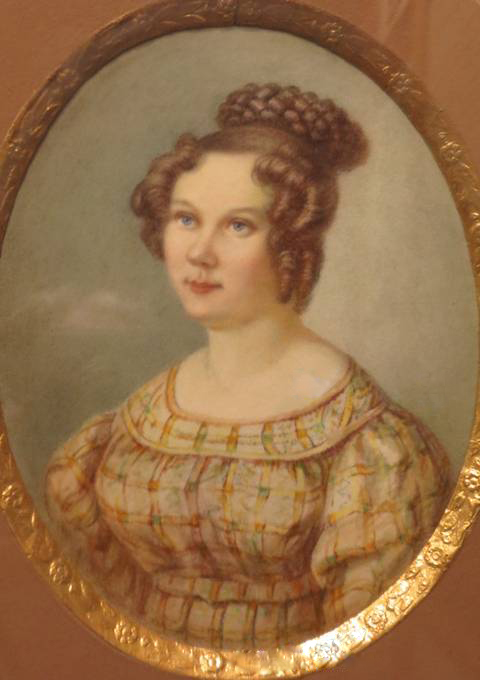
Ekaterina Trubetskaya

Decembrist Women were the wives, fiancées, sisters, and mothers of Decembrist rebels sentenced to forced labor who voluntarily accompanied them to exile in Siberia.

== Voluntary exile ==
The Supreme Criminal Court convicted 121 Decembrists, of whom 23 were married, all officers, with 15 from the high-ranking military. Three bore princely titles (S. G. Volkonsky, S. P. Trubetskoy, F. P. Shakhovskoy), and two had baronial titles (A. E. Rosen and V. I. Shteyngel). Some Decembrists had close ties to the imperial court.

Upon moving to Siberia, Decembrist women, like their husbands, lost noble privileges and were treated as wives of convicts: they faced restrictions on travel, communication, and property rights. Decembrist wives were prohibited from taking their children, and returning to European Russia was often restricted, even after their husbands' deaths.

Overcoming numerous obstacles, the first women to reach the Transbaikal mines in 1827 were Maria Volkonskaya, Alexandra Muravyova, and Ekaterina Trubetskaya. Between 1828 and 1831, others joined them at Petrovsky Zavod and Chita:

- fiancée of Ivan Annenkov - Pauline Gueble,
- fiancée of Vasily Ivashov - Camilla Le Dentu,
- wife of Vasily Davydov - Alexandra Davydova,
- wife of Andrei Yentaltsov - Alexandra Yentaltsova,
- wife of Mikhail Naryshkin - Elizaveta Naryshkina,
- wife of Andrei Rosen - Anna Rosen,
- wife of Mikhail Fonvizin - Natalia Fonvizina,
- wife of Aleksei Yushnevsky - Maria Yushnevskaya,
- sister of Nikolay Bestuzhev - Elena Bestuzheva

Many Decembrist women were denied permission to join their relatives in Siberia. The mother of the Bestuzhev brothers, for instance, petitioned with her daughters to join her sons in Selenginsk, but Emperor Nicholas I denied her request. After her death in 1844, her daughters were finally granted permission to travel to Siberia.

== Legacy ==
The Decembrist wives were the subject of the poem Russian Women by Nikolay Nekrasov, originally titled "Decembrist Women."

In 2008, a monument to eleven Decembrist wives was erected in a park near the historic Zavalnoye Cemetery in Tobolsk.

On September 12, 2011, a monument to Decembrist wives was unveiled in Irkutsk.

The story of the Decembrists and their wives was recounted in the 1975 Soviet film, The Captivating Star of Happiness.

== Sources ==
- Pavlyuchenko, E. A. In Voluntary Exile. Moscow: Nauka, 1986.
- Silberstein, I. S. The Decembrist Artist Nikolai Bestuzhev. Moscow: Izobrazitelnoe Iskusstvo, 1988.
- Notes of Princess Volkonskaya. Chita, 1991.
- A. E. Rosen. Memoirs of a Decembrist. Chapter Eight. In Chita.
