= Three Men in a Boat (1979 film) =

- Written by: Semyon Lungin
- Directed by: Naum Birman
- Starring: Andrei Mironov; Alexander Schirvindt; Mikhail Derzhavin
- Music by: Alexander Kolker
- Country of origin: Soviet Union
- Original language: Russian

Production
- Cinematography: Genrikh Marandzhan
- Running time: 127 min
- Production company: Lenfilm

Original release
- Release: 1979

Three Men in a Boat (To Say Nothing of the Dog) (Russian: Трое в лодке, не считая собаки, romanized: Troe v lodke, ne schitaya sobaki) is a 1979 Soviet two-part musical-comedy miniseries directed by Naum Birman and based on the eponymous 1889 novel by Jerome K. Jerome.

== Plot ==
Three friends: J, Harris and George, tired of idleness and wanting to correct their ill health, decide to go on a boat trip along the Thames. Together they take the Fox Terrier Montmorency. Before their journey, they agree to travel without females. But almost immediately on the road, they meet three women going the same way as themselves: Anne, Emily and Patricia. First, the heroes try to keep their agreement, but then fall in love with these women, and the women fall in love with them. In the finale, they are three couples in love.

In the final episode of the film, it is understood that Jerome K. Jerome invented his friends and the whole story from loneliness.

== Cast ==
- Andrei Mironov as Jerome K. Jerome / J. / Mrs. Baikli (1 series) / Uncle Podger (ibid.) / Innkeeper (2 series) / visitor to the inn (ibid.)
- Alexander Schirvindt as Sir Samuel William Harris (partly voiced by Igor Efimov)
- Mikhail Derzhavin as George
- Larisa Golubkina as Anne
- Alina Pokrovskaya as Emily
- Irina Mazurkiewicz as Patricia
- Zinovy Gerdt as gravedigger (1 series)
- Nikolai Boyarsky as 1st Grenadier (ibid.)
- Grigory Shpigel as 2nd Grenadier (ibid.)
- Yuri Katin-Yartsev as 3rd Grenadier (ibid.)
- Anna Lisyanskaya as the hostess of the salon, whom the performance of comic songs leaves without guests (ibid.)
- Georgy Shtil as mustachioed captain
- Tatyana Pelttser as Mrs. Poppits, the landlady
- Fox Terriers "Duke" and "Sin" as Montmorency
