= Black Gull =

1962 film

- Russian: Чёрная чайка
- Directed by: Grigoriy Koltunov
- Written by: Grigoriy Koltunov
- Starring: Anatoliy Adoskin; Saida Dadasheva; Igor Dmitriev; Dzheikhun Dzhamal; Aleksei Loktev
- Cinematography: Dmitry Meskhiev
- Music by: Antonio Spadavekkia
- Release date: 1962
- Country: Soviet Union
- Language: Russian

Black Gull (Russian: Чёрная чайка) is a 1962 Soviet adventure film directed by Grigoriy Koltunov.

== Plot ==
The film takes place in Cuba after the revolution, in a fishing village by the sea. The United States is still trying to return the old regime and send sabotage groups there. The film tells about a group of guys in whose eyes this is happening.

== Cast ==
- Anatoliy Adoskin
- Saida Dadasheva as Panchita
- Igor Dmitriev
- Dzheikhun Dzhamal as Manolo
- Aleksei Loktev
- Anatoliy Podshivalov as Sardinka
- Viktoriya Vika as Silviya
- Sergei Yursky
