= Mikhail Derzhavin =

Soviet and Russian actor

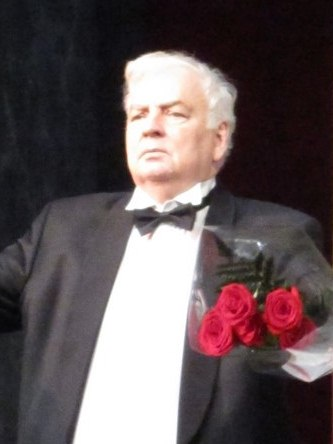
- Mikhail Derzhavin (2011)
- Born: Mikhail Mikhajlovich Derzhavin; 15 June 1936; Moscow, Soviet Union
- Died: 10 January 2018 (aged 81); Moscow, Russia
- Education: Boris Shchukin Theatre Institute
- Occupation: Actor
- Spouse: Roksana Babajan (3rd wife)
- Children: Marija Derzhavina

Mikhail Mikhajlovich Derzhavin(Russian: Михаи́л Миха́йлович Держа́вин; 15 June 1936 in Moscow – 10 January 2018 in Moscow) was a Soviet and Russian actor.

== Biography ==
Mikhail Mikhajlovich Derzhavin was born in the family of the People's Artist of the RSFSR, who was the leading actor of Vakhtangov’s Theatre, Mikhail Derzhavin and Iraida Derzhavina. He grew up in a house on the Vakhtangov Street, home to numerous actors, artists and musicians. The next entrance was to the Shchukin Theater School. All children's games were centered on improvised theatrical stage: children staged tales, wrote scripts, assigned roles and were both actors and audience. The famous “Vakhtangovs”, such as Ruben Simonov and Viktor Koltsov, visited Derazhavin's apartment frequently.

After the start of the Great Patriotic War, the Vakhtangov's Theater was evacuated to Omsk. During the evacuation Mikhail Derzhavin attended all performances of his father, but he especially liked "Marshal Kutuzov". At the age of five, Mikhail learned by heart Kutuzov's monologue, and he read it in front of injured in the hospital. In 1954 he entered the Shchukin's Theater School, after he worked at the Lenkom Theatre in 1959. In 1965 he moved to the Theater on Malaya Bronnaya, and since 1968 he worked in the Moscow Theater of Satire. He was a friend and constant partner of Alexander Shirvindt's cabaret since 1957. In the mid-1980s, they hosted the program "Morning Post” together, and beginning in 2013 they hosted "I want to know".

== Death ==
Derzhavin died on 10 January 2018, aged 81, following a long illness. Information about Derzhavin's death was confirmed by his widow, Roksana Babajan.

== Family ==
- Mother – Iraida Ivanovna Derzhavina, actress of Vakhtangov's Theatre.
- Father – Mihail Stepanovich Derzhavin, actor of Vakhtangov's Theatre.
- First wife – Ekaterina Arkad'evna Rajkina, daughter of actor Arkady Raikin
- Second wife – Nina Semjonovna Budjonnaja, daughter of Marshal of the Soviet Union Semyon Budyonny
- Daughter – Marija Mihajlovna Derzhavina (born 1963)
- Grandsons – Peter and Paul
- Third wife – Roksana Rubenovna Babajan (singer)

== Selected filmography ==
- The Artamanov Affair (1941) as Pyotr Artamonov
- They Were the First (1956) as Yevgeny Gorovskoy
- The Dream (1964) as Karl Bryulov
- Three Men in a Boat (1979) as George
- Investigation Held by ZnaToKi (1980) as Valetny
- Winter Evening in Gagra (1985) as episode
- Old Hags (2000) as Secretary of the Communist ideology

== Awards ==
- Honored Artist of the RSFSR (1974)
- People's Artist of the RSFSR (1989)
- Order of Friendship (1996)
- Order "For Merit to the Fatherland" IV class (2006)
- Order "For Merit to the Fatherland" III class (2011)
- Order of Honour (2017)
