= Isaac Schwartz =

Soviet and Russian composer (1923–2009)

- Born: Исаак Иосифович Шварц; 13 May 1923; Romny, Ukrainian SSR, USSR
- Died: 27 December 2009 (aged 86); Siversky, Leningrad Oblast, Russia
- Other name: Isaak Shvarts
- Education: Leningrad Conservatory
- Occupation: composer
- Known for: film music
- Awards: Nika Award (1992)

Isaac Iosifovich Schwartz (Russian: Исаак Иосифович Шварц; 13 May 1923 – 27 December 2009), also known as Isaak Shvarts, was a Soviet composer.

Schwartz was born in Romny in the Ukrainian SSR in 1923. His family moved to Leningrad in 1930, where he learned to play the piano. He gave his first concert in 1935 with the Leningrad Philharmonic Orchestra.

Schwartz's father was professor of archeology at the Leningrad State University: he was arrested in 1936 and executed two years later as part of the Great Purge. Schwartz's family was exiled to Kyrgyzstan in 1937, and Schwartz gave private music lessons in Frunze (now Bishkek) as well as occasionally accompanying the silent films at the cinema with live music.

During the Second World War, Schwartz directed one of the sections of the Red Army Choir. During that time, he met Mariya Dmitriyevna, the sister of Russian composer Dmitri Shostakovich, who introduced him to her brother. Shostakovich helped Schwartz gain entry to the Rimsky-Korsakov Conservatory in Leningrad, whence he graduated with a diploma in composition in 1951. He joined the Union of Soviet Composers in 1955. Only years later did he discover that Shostakovich had paid for his education. When Shostakovich was dismissed from the Conservatory, Schwartz was asked to denounce Shostakovich, but he refused.

Schwartz's first major commission was the music for the film Our Correspondent in 1959. He went on to compose the music for more than 100 Soviet films, including White Sun of the Desert (Белое солнце пустыни, 1969) and The Captivating Star of Happiness (Звезда пленительного счастья, 1975). Perhaps his best known work outside of the Soviet Union was for Akira Kurosawa's 1975 film Dersu Uzala. He won the prestigious Nika Award of the Russian Academy of Cinema Arts and Sciences for 1992 for his music for the films White King, Red Queen (Белый король, красная королева) and Luna Park (Луна-парк).

Schwartz also composed music for ballets and theatrical performances and, to a lesser extent, for television. His one symphony, Gelbe Sterne – Purimspiel im Ghetto, composed in 1993, was first performed in Saint Petersburg in 2000: it was inspired by the story of the Kovno Ghetto in Lithuania. The work was recorded on Capriccio with Russian National Philharmonic Orchestra under Vladimir Spivakov in 2005 (currently available as a download only).

Schwartz died in Siversky, near Saint Petersburg, Russian Federation, on 27 December 2009, aged 86.

== Selected filmography ==
- Zhenya, Zhenechka and Katyusha (1967)
- The Seventh Companion (1967)
- The Brothers Karamazov (1969)
- The Stationmaster (1972)
- The Straw Hat (1974)
- The Flight of Mr. McKinley (1975)
- Dersu Uzala (1975)
- Melodies of a White Night (1976)
- Where were you, Odysseus? (1978)
- Do Not Shoot at White Swans (1980)
- Sofia Kovalevskaya (1985)
- Wild Pigeon (1986)
- An Umbrella for Lovers (1986)
- Luna Park (1992)
- Empire under Attack (2000)
