= Naum Birman =

- Born: Naum Borisovich Birman; 19 May 1924; Leningrad
- Died: 19 September 1989 (aged 65); Leningrad
- Resting place: Memorial Cemetery, Leningrad Oblast
- Years active: 1965–1989
- Notable work: Three Men in a Boat (1979)
- Children: 2

Naum Borisovich Birman (Russian: Нау́м Бори́сович Би́рман; 1924—1989) was a Soviet director of theater and cinema, screenwriter.

Cavalier of the Order of Friendship of Peoples (1986).

He worked as an actor and director in the Leningrad theaters, as director of the productions of Arkady Raikin.

He was buried at the Memorial Cemetery in Komarovo near Leningrad.

First wife Emilia Popova (1928—2001), actress of Tovstonogov Bolshoi Drama Theater. Son Anatoly Popov, actor. Since the second marriage there is a son Boris (born 1966).

== Filmography ==
- 1965 — Accident
- 1967 — Chronicles of a Dive Bomber
- 1970 — The Magic Power
- 1972 — A Teacher of Singing
- 1973 — I Serve On the Border
- 1975 — Step Forward
- 1978 — The Trace on the Earth
- 1979 — Three Men in a Boat
- 1980 — We Looked in the Death's Face
- 1983 — Black and White Magic
- 1985 — The Sunday Daddy
- 1986 — Sunday's Father
- 1989 — Cyrano de Bergerac
