= The Suicide Club, or the Adventures of a Titled Person =

1981 Soviet adventure film

- Written by: Edgar Dubrovsky
- Directed by: Yevgeny Tatarsky
- Starring: Oleg Dahl; Donatas Banionis; Igor Dmitriev
- Narrated by: Yevgeny Tatarsky
- Music by: Nadezhda Simonyan
- Country of origin: Soviet Union
- Original language: Russian

Production
- Producer: Yuri Gubanov
- Cinematography: Konstantin Ryzhov
- Editor: Tamara Guseva
- Running time: 190 minutes
- Production company: Lenfilm

Original release
- Release: 12 January – 14 January 1981

The Suicide Club, or the Adventures of a Titled Person (Russian: Клуб самоубийц, или Приключения титулованной особы, romanized: Klub samoubiyts, ili Priklucheniya titulovannoi osoby) is a 1981 Soviet three-part television adventure film directed by Yevgeny Tatarsky. It is based on two series of novels by Robert Louis Stevenson's — The Suicide Club and The Rajah's Diamond. It was shown in January 1981 on TV under the title The Adventures of Prince Florizel. The original title was restored in the 1990s.

== Plot ==
Adventure seeker Prince Florizel of Bacardia walks around London in the clothes of a simple townsman along with his friend, Colonel Geraldine. At night on the embankment they meet a young man with a stone on his neck, preparing to commit suicide. He turns out to be an artist who has lost all hope in life and does not have enough money to join the mysterious Suicide Club, where only for 40 pounds each man can die like a gentleman. The next victim and "performer" are selected randomly from the members of the club. The mysterious chairman is in charge of everything.

Florizel decides to enter the club and at the second meeting of the club, having pulled out an ace of spades becomes in the position of the victim. Geraldine does not allow the execution of the verdict and soon all members of the club appear before the court of the prince. However, to dispose of the chairman or to hand him over to the organs of justice, Florizel can not - he is bound by duties when joining the club. Then he decides to send the chairman on a journey with his brother Geraldine. Perhaps in the long journey the chairman will give an occasion to call him to a duel and only so it will be possible to settle accounts with him. During his trip to Europe, the President manages to escape.

At the same time, events are unfolding in connection with the theft of the famous diamond of Rajah from the collection of General Wendeler. The precious stone is hunted by both the chairman and Prince Florizel. To find the criminal, the prince turns to the help of Europe's underworld and finds the daughter and son of the chairman, the cowboy Frank Scrimgeour. In the end, Florizel goes on the trail of his opponent, thanks to the long-standing passion of President Jeannette, who agrees to help. The prince summons the criminal to a duel and kills him. The find the diamond, which was the cause of many deaths, and it is thrown by His Highness into the Thames so that it will no longer be a temptation to hunters for profit.

== Cast ==
- Oleg Dahl as Prince Florizel
- Donatas Banionis as Chairman, he is Nick Nichols, he is also Checkered (voiced by Aleksandr Demyanenko)
- Igor Dmitriev as Colonel Geraldine
- Lyubov Polishchuk as Jeannette
- Vitaly Ilyin as Mark
- Igor Yankovsky as Geraldine Jr.
- Askhab Abakarov as Perkins (voiced by Vyacheslav Baranov)
- Elena Solovey as Lady Wendeler
- Boris Novikov as General Wendeler
- Ivan Mokeev as Charlie Pendreghon
- Vladimir Shevelkov as Harry Hartley
- Vladimir Basov as Inspector Trenton
- Mikhail Pugovkin as gardener of the Raburn
- Yevgeny Kindinov as Simon Rolls, theologian
- Valery Matveyev as cowboy Frank Scrimgeour
- Elena Tsyplakova as Joan
- Anatoly Stolbov as newspaper employee
- Valentin Golubenko as gangster Sam-station wagon
- Vyacheslav Vasilyev as Malthus, member of the Suicide Club
- Vladimir Losev as member of Suicide Club
- Mikhail Birbraer as member of the Suicide Club
- Anatoly Podshivalov as member of the Suicide Club
- Valery Mironov as member of the Suicide Club
- Helium Sysoev as Detective Kraft
- Ilya Reznik as criminal in a wheelchair (voiced by Lev Milinder)
- Maria Belkina as a young Englishwoman on a ship
- Lyubov Malinovskaya as an elderly Englishwoman on a ship
- Valery Filonov as moustachioed criminal, fleeing in Constantinople
- Yevgeny Ilovaisky as man sentenced to death

== See also ==
- The Suicide Club Adaptations
