= White Sun of the Desert =

- Directed by: Vladimir Motyl
- Written by: Valentin Yezhov; Rustam Ibragimbekov
- Produced by: Experimental Studio of Mosfilm
- Starring: Anatoly Kuznetsov; Spartak Mishulin; Pavel Luspekayev
- Cinematography: Eduard Rozovsky
- Music by: Isaac Schwartz (song lyrics by Bulat Okudzhava)
- Distributed by: Lenfilm; Mosfilm
- Release date: 30 March 1970
- Running time: 85 min
- Country: Soviet Union
- Language: Russian

White Sun of the Desert (Russian: Белое солнце пустыни, romanized: Beloye solntse pustyni) is a 1970 Soviet Ostern film.

Its blend of action comedy, music and drama made it highly successful at the Soviet box-office and resulted in a number of memorable quotes. It retains high domestic approval. Its main theme song, "Your Noble Highness Lady Fortune" (Ваше благородие, госпожа удача, music: Isaac Schwartz, lyrics: Bulat Okudzhava, performed by Pavel Luspekayev) became a hit. The film is watched by Russian cosmonauts before most space launches as a good luck ritual.

== Plot ==
The setting is the east shore of the Caspian Sea (modern Turkmenistan) where the Red Army soldier Fyodor Sukhov has been fighting the Civil War in Russian Asia for a number of years. The movie opens with a panoramic shot of a bucolic Russian countryside. Katerina Matveyevna, Sukhov's beloved wife, is standing in a field. Awakening from this daydream, Sukhov is walking through the Central Asian desert – a stark contrast to his homeland. He finds Sayid buried in the sand. Sukhov frees Sayid, and they strike a friendly but reticent relationship. Sayid, an austere Central Asian, comes to Sukhov's rescue in sticky situations throughout the movie. While traveling together they are caught up in a desert fight between a Red Army cavalry unit and Basmachi guerrillas. The cavalry unit commander, Rakhimov, leaves to Sukhov's temporary protection the harem of the Basmachi leader Abdullah, left behind by him. Rakhimov also leaves a young Red Army soldier, Petrukha, to assist Sukhov, and proceeds to pursue the fleeing Abdullah.

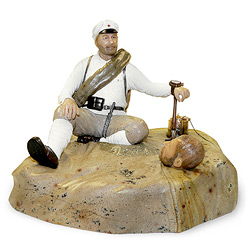
A timepiece portraying the scene from the film when Sukhov sees Sayid buried in sand

Sukhov and women from Abdullah's harem return to a nearby shore village. There, Sukhov charges the local museum's curator with protecting the women, and prepares to head home. Sukhov hopes to "modernize" the wives of the harem, and make them part of the modern society. He urges them to take off their burqa and reject polygamy. The wives are loath to do this, though, and as Sukhov takes on the role of protector, the wives declare him their new husband.

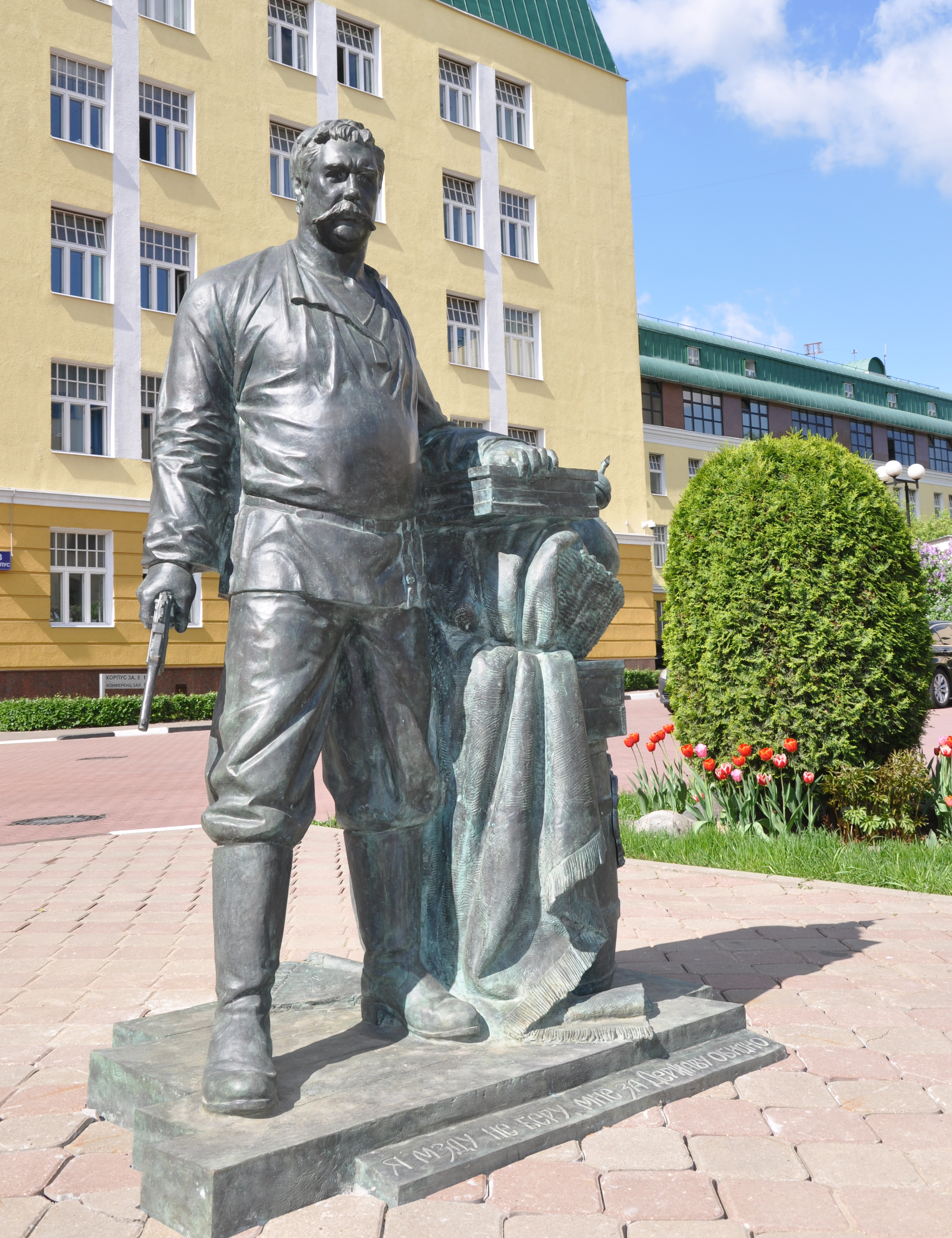
A monument to Vereshchagin

Soon, looking for a seaway across the border, Abdullah and his gang come to the same village and find Abdullah's wives. Sukhov is bound to stay. Hoping to obtain help and weapons, Sukhov and Petrukha visit Pavel Vereschagin, a former Tsar's customs official. Vereschagin warms to Petrukha who reminds him of his dead son, but after discussing the matter with his nagging wife, Vereschagin refuses to help Sukhov. Sukhov finds a machine gun and a case of dynamite that he plants on Abdullah's ship. Meanwhile, Abdullah has confronted his wives, and is preparing to punish them for their "dishonor", as they did not kill themselves when Abdullah left them. Sukhov manages to capture and lock Abdullah as a hostage, but after he leaves, Abdullah convinces Gyulchatai, the youngest wife of the harem, to free him and then kills Gyulchatai and Petrukha.

The museum curator shows Sukhov an ancient underground passage that leads to the sea. Sukhov and the women of the harem attempt to escape through the passage, but on arriving at the seashore they are impelled to hide in a large empty oil tank. Abdullah discovers them and makes plans to set the oil tank on fire.

Enraged at the cold-hearted murder of Petrukha, Vereschagin decides to help Sukhov and takes Abdullah's ship. Sayid also helps Sukhov, and together they fend off Abdullah's gang. Vereschagin, unaware of the dynamite on the ship and not hearing Sukhov's shouted warnings, dies on the exploding ship.

Sukhov kills Abdullah and his gang, returns the harem to Rakhimov and bids farewell to Sayid. He then begins his journey home on foot, having refused a horse since a horse is merely "a nuisance".

== Cast ==
Mishulin as Sayid

- Anatoly Kuznetsov as Fyodor Ivanovich Sukhov – a Red Army soldier, who returns home on foot through the desert after recovering in a hospital from wounds sustained in the war. He shows much wisdom and skill in his actions and a gentle human side in his graphical dreams, in which he mentally writes letters to his beloved wife.

Georgi Yumatov was chosen for the role, but was dismissed for a drunken brawl right before the shooting. Therefore, Motyl called for Kuznetsov, who was the second choice during the selection.

- Pavel Luspekayev as Pavel Vereschagin – a former tsarist customs official. Vereschagin lives a lonely life as the only Russian, along with his wife, in a remote village. The walls of his house are covered with pictures of the military campaigns where he was awarded and wounded. The Civil War has left him without an official job and a place to go. He is a big man and a straightforward person with a tendency for alcoholism due to the nostalgia for his past. He has an arsenal of weapons that brings both conflicting parties (Sukhov and Abdullah's men) to his house at some point in the film. Initially neutral, he eventually takes the side of Sukhov.

This was Luspekayev's last role. A World War II veteran and an experienced stage actor, both of his feet were amputated in the 1960s due to past injuries. Given Luspekayev's condition, Motyl wrote a script for a man on crutches. Luspekayev refused, arguing that his character should appear not as a cripple, but as a strong person who died prematurely. While filming, he walked on prosthetic legs and had to take regular rests due to pain. He died in 1970.

- Spartak Mishulin as Sayid – a skilled man of few words. He seeks revenge on Dzhavdet, a Basmachi gang leader who killed his father, robbed his family and buried him in sand for a slow death; otherwise his motives and reactions are unclear and unexpected. For example, after Sukhov dug him out, Sayid, instead of thanking him, says, "Why did you dig me out? There will be no rest while Dzhavdet is alive." Sayid suddenly appears every now and then to help Sukhov against bandits, but when asked why, simply replies that he has "heard shooting," giving an impression that he just seeks Dzhavdet via any armed conflict nearby.

In contrast with Luspekayev, this was one of the first movie roles for Mishulin, although he was previously active as a TV and stage actor.

- Kakhi Kavsadze as Abdullah – a cunning Basmachi leader with no respect for human life. Both he and Sayid originate from poor families, and their fathers were friends. However, contrary to Sayid, Abdullah took the path of banditry.

Kavsadze, a Georgian by nationality, fit very well into the role of an Asian gang leader. However, he had never ridden a horse, while his character was supposed to be a keen horse rider. He never actually rides in the film, but only sits on a horse, or even on the shoulders of an assistant.

- Nikolai Godovikov as Petrukha – a young Red Army soldier. He attempts to court Gyulchatai, aiming to start a family.

Coincidentally, Godovikov started dating Denisova (one of the actresses who played Gyulchatai) after filming.

- Raisa Kurkina as Nastasia, Vereschagin's wife and a homemaker.
- Galina Luchai as Katerina Matveyevna, Sukhov's wife – she appears in the film only through Sukhov's dreams, to elaborate his character.

Abdullah's wives

- Alla Limenes – Zarina
- Tatyana Krichevskaya, Galina Dashevskaya and Galina Umpeleva as Dzhamilya
- Zinaida Rakhmatova as Gyuzel
- Svetlana Slivinskaya as Saida
- Velta Chebotarenok (Deglav) as Khafiza
- Tatyana Tkach as Zukhra
- Lidiya Smirnova as Leila
- Zinaida Rachmatova as Zulfia
- Tatiana Fedotova and Tatiana Denisova as Gyulchatai – the youngest and most inquisitive wife of Abdullah. She is the only wife who interacts with outsiders, i.e., Sukhov and Petrukha.

Most of Abdullah's wives were portrayed by non-professional actors. As they wore burqas most of the time, they were often replaced by other women, and even by male soldiers from the military unit stationed nearby. Motyl shot a few semi-nude scenes involving some of the wives for character development, but those scenes were cut by censors.

== Weapons ==
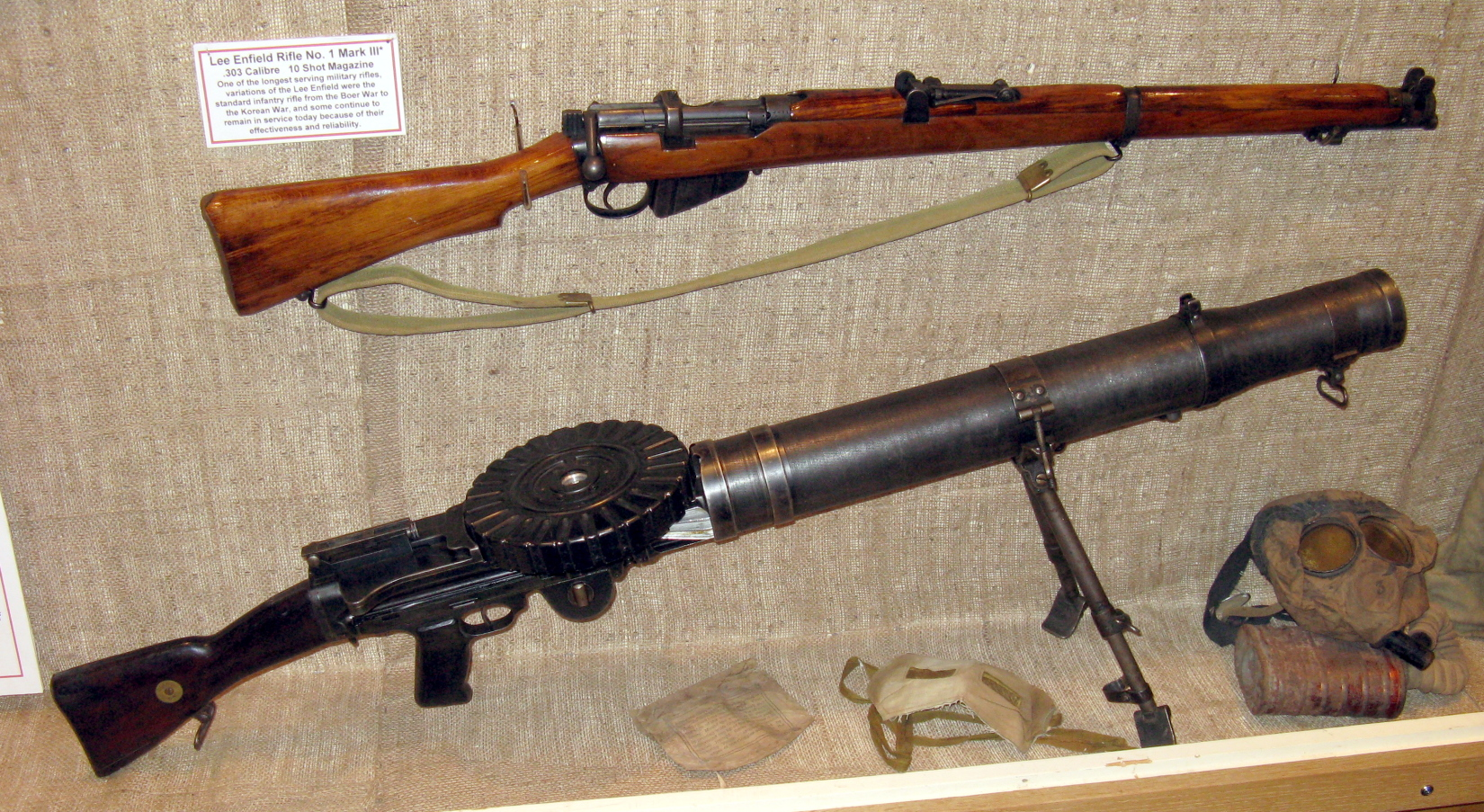
Sukhov supposedly uses a Lewis gun (bottom), though in some scenes it is replaced by a Russian DT gun with an attached dummy cooling shroud. Abdullah's gang members carry rifles similar to the one shown on top.

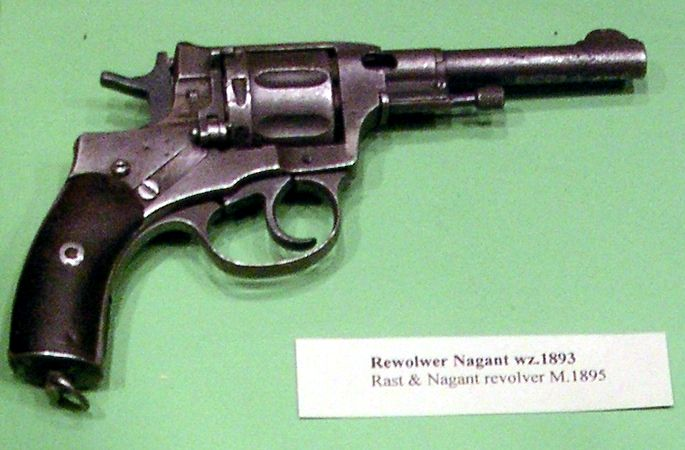
Nagant revolver similar to that used by Sukhov

Weaponry is explicitly used to characterize and develop the characters. Sayid is found barehanded in the beginning; he acquires all his weapons through the film and uses them skillfully. Sukhov gives him a knife, which Sayid later throws to kill an attacker. He shoots a carbine taken from a bandit, whom he strangled using rope as a lasso (while helping Sukhov). His skills in riding are demonstrated when he jumps on a horse, back first, while walking backwards and keeping his enemy at gunpoint. He then slowly rides away, sitting backwards on the horse.

Vereschagin, despite having an arsenal of small arms, fights barehanded, which accentuates his brute force and straightforwardness. Both Sukhov and Abdullah use handguns rather than rifles, as appropriate to their leading, officer-like positions. Sukhov carries a Nagant M1895 revolver, a personal gift from brigade commander M. N. Kovun, whereas Abdullah uses a Mauser C96. To deal with Abdullah's gang, Sukhov fetches and fixes a machine gun. Petrukha has a rifle that jams and never fires when needed. Abdullah's gang members carry carbines and long knives characteristic of the time and region.

== Development and script ==
The director, Vladimir Motyl, said such films as Stagecoach and High Noon influenced him and he has described the film as being a "cocktail" of both an adventurous Russian folktale and a western. Initially several directors, including Andrei Tarkovsky and Andrei Konchalovsky, were offered the film but they turned it down, Motyl claims, for two main reasons. Firstly, Konchalovsky thought only American actors could pull off the part of a lead role in a western, and secondly the screenplay was considered weak. Motyl also initially turned down the offer, but then found himself in a no-choice situation, as he would not be given any other film to direct.

After the first version of the film was turned down by Mosfilm, Valentin Yezhov and Rustam Ibragimbekov were assigned to improve the script. Ibragimbekov was chosen by his nationality as an expert on the East, though in reality he was raised in Russia and never been in the region. A war veteran told Yezhov a story of a harem abandoned by a Basmachi leader on the run, which became the pivot of the new script. Further rewriting came from Motyl after he replaced Konchalovsky as director. Motyl completely reshaped and put forward the character of Vereschagin – all his dialogues, as well as about 60% of the entire script, were rewritten and improvised during the filming. Motyl also came up with the idea of revealing Sukhov's personality through his dreams, in which he writes letters to his beloved wife. Those letters were composed by Mark Zakharov, a friend of Motyl's.

Years later, Konchalovsky praised the final script as a masterpiece.

== Filming ==
Sukhov's dream scenes were filmed first, near Luga, Leningrad Oblast, while the bulk of the film was shot on the western shore of the Caspian Sea near Makhachkala, Dagestan. The sand dune scenes were shot in the Karakum Desert near Mary, Turkmenistan, with the museum scenes filmed in the nearby ancient city of Merv. The distinctive Kyz Kala (Gyz Gala) fortress, for example, figures prominently. The dune scenes were demanding for actors, who had to make large circles in the scorching heat to approach the shooting location without leaving telltale traces in the sand. However, the heaviest burden fell on Mishulin, who spent in total several days in a box buried in sand while preparing for several takes of the opening scene. The village buildings and Vereschagin's house were temporary mockups that had to be regularly repaired due to damage from frequent winds.

Horse riding scenes were performed by the special stunt unit formed for the War and Peace film series. Although it did not perform any stunts in this film, one member of the unit died in an accident during filming. Some other accidents occurred due to poor overall discipline and security. For example, a cut is seen on Vereschagin's face when he fights on the ship. He received this cut in a drunken brawl the day before. Also, some props were stolen by local thieves one night. Security was improved after Motyl hired a local criminal leader for the role of a member of Abdullah's gang.

The film involved two dangerous stunts, the first when Abdullah's officer, supposedly thrown out by Vereschagin, breaks through a second-floor window and falls to the sand below. The other is when Sukhov jumps from an oil tank set on fire. Both stunts were performed by Valentin Faber.

== Soundtrack ==
"Your Noble Highness, Lady Luck" (Russian: Ваше благородие, госпожа Удача, lit. 'Vashe blagorodye, gospozha Udacha'), sung by Vereschagin accompanied by a guitar, is a musical motif in the film. The lyrics talk about loneliness, humanity’s dependence on luck, and hope for love. These lyrics mirror many of the film's central themes, including Vereschagin's sadness and Sukhov's separation from Katerina. The song was written by Okudzhava on personal request by Motyl, who had worked with him in the past. A line from this song, "Nine grams into your heart, wait, don't call," is included as an homage in the script of the 1985 Soviet action film The Detached Mission.

== Reception ==
On review aggregator website Rotten Tomatoes, White Sun of the Desert has an 86% approval rating based on 34 reviews.

White Sun of the Desert became one of the most popular movies of all time in the Soviet Union, where it has attained the status of a classic. With 34.5 million viewers, it was one of the most popular films of 1970. The film received no awards during the Soviet era. It was nominated for the 1970 USSR State Prize, but lost to By the Lake. The latter one was seen as "ideologically correct", while the first one was seen as pure entertainment, i.e., of low ideological value. In the opinion of film director Motyl the film was not allowed to film festivals abroad, because the Soviet ideologists were sure that it will receive awards there, which was ideologically inadmissible. Only in 1998 was it awarded the Russian State Prize by a special decree of President Boris Yeltsin, being recognized as culturally significant.

The film received limited attention in the West. It was shown at a Soviet film festival at the Little Carnegie Theatre in 1973, meant to tie in with Leonid Brezhnev's visit to the United States. Roger Greenspun, the New York Times movie critic, classified it as an "escapist entertainment" (together with another Soviet film, a comedy Ivan Vassilyevich Changes His Profession) and describes it as a "picaresque adventure".

== Legacy ==
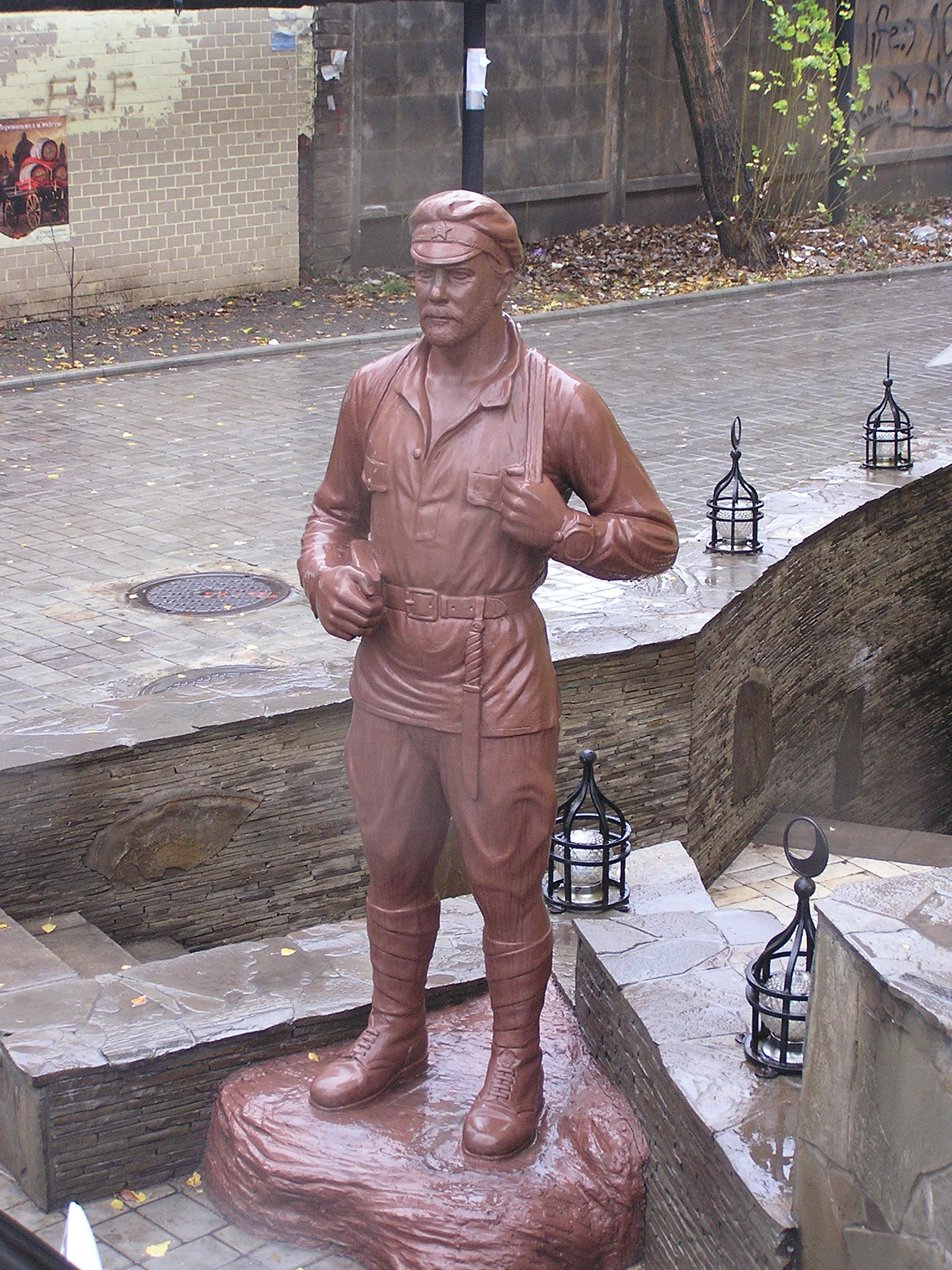
Monument of Sukhov in Donetsk

In 1998, the creators of the film were awarded the 1997 Russian Federation State Prize in Literature and Arts, nearly 30 years after the film left the silver screen. A Russian computer game was released based on the film. Vereschagin became a symbol of a customs officer, with monuments honoring him erected in Amvrosiivka (2001), Kurgan (2007), Moscow (2008) and Luhansk (2011). Monuments of Sukhov are known in Donetsk (ca. 2009) and Samara (2012)

All crew members boarding Russian space flights are committed to watch "White Sun of the Desert" before the launch, and the names of Abdullah's wives are assigned to craters on Venus: Зарина, Джамиля, Гюзель, Саида, Хафиза, Зухра, Лейла, Зульфия, Гюльчатай.

== Popular quotes ==
Many popular sayings have entered the Russian language from the film. The first is by far the best known.

- The Orient is a delicate matter (Восток — дело тонкое); refers to any complicated or difficult matter, not necessarily "oriental" in nature.
- I feel sorry for the great state (Мне за державу обидно); used in the face of failure of the state or collapse of its institutions. This phrase, among other things, was used as the title of several books by notable writers.
- Are there questions? No, there aren't! (Вопросы есть? Вопросов нет!); refers to the commanding tone of an officer that will not hear objections to his command. This line was reused in the 2005 Afghanistan war epic The 9th Company.
- Customs gives the green light (Таможня дает добро!); refers to any type of approval, especially reluctant approval.
- His grenades are the wrong caliber (Да гранаты у него не той системы); refers to or to comment upon any kind of excuse, particularly a pathetic one. The line wasn't scripted, but improvised by the actor. It is similar to the English "The wrong type of snow"
- Gyulchatai, show your sweet face (Гюльчатай, открой личико); a popular Russian saying for boys to say to girls.

Gyulchatai has become a placeholder name for a Central Asian girl.

- Mahmud, light the fire (Махмуд, поджигай!); used when embarking cheerfully on some difficult potentially dangerous mission.
- I'm unlucky in death, maybe I'll be lucky in love (Не везёт мне в смерти, повезёт в любви); the refrain of the theme song

== Bibliography ==
- Yezhov, Valentin and Ibragimbekov, Rustam (2001) Белое солнце пустыни, Vagrius, ISBN 5-264-00694-6
