= It Can't Be! =

- Film poster
- Directed by: Leonid Gaidai
- Written by: Vladlen Bahnov; Leonid Gaidai
- Based on: Crime and Punishment, Fun Adventure and Wedding Event by Mikhail Zoshchenko
- Starring: Mikhail Pugovkin; Nina Grebeshkova; Vyacheslav Nevinny; Oleg Dahl; Svetlana Kryuchkova; Mikhail Kokshenov; Natalya Seleznyova; Evgeny Zharikov; Leonid Kuravlyov; Valentina Telichkina; Lyudmila Shagalova; Georgy Vitsin; Savely Kramarov
- Cinematography: Sergei Poluyanov
- Music by: Aleksandr Zatsepin
- Distributed by: Mosfilm; Experimental Creative Association
- Release date: 1975
- Running time: 92 min.
- Country: Soviet Union
- Language: Russian

It Can't Be! (Russian: Не может быть!, romanized: Ne mozhet byt'!) is a 1975 Soviet anthology comedy film directed by Leonid Gaidai. It consists of three short stories, based on the works of Mikhail Zoshchenko: Crime and Punishment, Fun Adventure and Wedding Event.

== Plot summary ==
=== Crime and Punishment ===
==== Plot ====
The first segment describes the complexity of the shop manager, Gorbushkin living in Soviet times, the end of the 1920s on unearned income. Being called to the investigator, he thoroughly believes that this will not bring anything good. These thoughts go to his wife, Anna, and his brother-in-law. Anna Vasilyevna, his wife, decides that in order to prevent the inevitable confiscations of their property, they must urgently sell everything that was acquired by "back-breaking" labor. In addition, Anna hastily divorces Gorbushkin and marries a neighbor, Vitaly Borisovich. And in the end, Gorbushkin, who is only called as a witness (a week before he still got arrested), returns home happily.

==== Cast ====
- Mikhail Pugovkin — Gorbushkin, store manager
- Nina Grebeshkova — Anna Vasilyevna, Gorbushkin's wife
- Vyacheslav Nevinny — Gorbushkin's brother-in-law, beer seller
- Mikhail Svetin — Vitaly Borisovich Bananov, Gorbushkin's neighbor
- Radner Muratov — militiaman
- Lev Polyakov — investigator
- Natalya Krachkovskaya — buyer of paintings
- Igor Yasulovich — Lyolik, buyer of paintings' husband
- Georgy Svetlani — beer lover
- Viktor Uralsky — little man with a pig
- Vladimir Gulyaev — the one-eyed furniture buyer
- Eduard Bredun — assistant buyer of furniture

=== Fun Adventure ===
==== Plot ====
The following short story of the film shows the intricacies of extramarital relations. Heading into the weekend supposedly to work, but in reality to his mistress, and sometimes hard to imagine that her husband's mistress could be lover lover friend, neighbor, friend and lover in the communal - a lover of your own wife. In the end, all six characters is purely coincidental, with interesting circumstances intersect together and gathered around the table, trying to find a way out of this situation, but in the end did not need and did not come. In any case, such a conclusion can be drawn from rolling in extreme caricature dispute sixes at the table.

==== Cast ====
- Oleg Dahl — Anatoly (a.k.a. Anatole) Barygin-Amurskiy
- Svetlana Kryuchkova — Zinaida (a.k.a. Zinulya), Nicholas's wife
- Mikhail Kokshenov — Sophia's neighbor
- Natalya Seleznyova — Tatiana (a.k.a. Tanya) Barygin-Amurskya, Anatoly's wife
- Evgeny Zharikov — Nicholas (a.k.a. Coca), Zinaida's husband
- Larisa Eryomina — Sophia (a.k.a. Sofochka), Zinaida's friend and «former ballerina of noblewomen»
- Zoya Isayeva — Sophia's neighbor, wash clothes in the basin
- Elena Volskaya — flower-girl
- Georgi Yumatov — passer-by with a bulldog

=== Wedding Event ===
In the final segment, a young man, Vladimir Zavitushkin, comes to his own wedding, where he is unable to recognize his fiancée/bride, since they only met once before. Moreover, the time is winter and, since they only met outside, he doesn't remember her without outer clothing. Desperate attempts to discreetly find out which of the women present at the wedding is his future wife, lead to unpredictable consequences - the groom mistakes his future mother-in-law and then her friend for his fiancée, who has concealed a couple of important things from him.

==== Cast ====
- Leonid Kuravlyov — Vladimir Zavitushkin, groom
- Valentina Telichkina — Catherine, Zavitushkin's fiancée/bride
- Lyudmila Shagalova — mother of Catherine
- Georgy Vitsin — father of Catherine
- Savely Kramarov — Sergei Ivanovich (a.k.a. Seryoga), Zavitushkin's friend, womanizer and heartthrob
- Svetlana Kharitonova — Elmira, Catherine's friend, always says: «enchanting!»
- Sergey Filippov — singer
- Natalya Krachkovskaya — 1st guest
- Igor Yasulovich — 2nd guest
- Eve Kivi — wife of Ivan Izrailevich
- Gotlib Roninson — Ivan Izrailevich, one of the guests
- Klara Rumyanova — one of the wedding guests

== Soundtrack ==
External videos
- It's not beer that spoils people The beer seller knows his work.

External videos
- Black horseshoes The wedding singer performs while Zavitushkin tries to recognize his bride.

Translation	Original title	Transliterated title	Performer
It's not beer that spoils people	«Губит людей не пиво»	Gubit lyudei ne pivo	Vyacheslav Nevinny
Cupid	«Купидон»	Kupidon	Oleg Dal
Black horseshoes	«Чёрные подковы»	Chyornye podkovy	Robert Mushkambaryan
Everything is possible	«Всё может быть»	Vsyo mozhet byt'	Oleg Anofriyev
At the samovar, me and my Masha	«У самовара я и моя Маша»	U samovara ya i moya Masha	instrumental ensemble
