= Vladimir Kunin =

Vladimir Vladimirovich Kunin (Владимир Владимирович Кунин) (actually Vladimir Feinberg, 19 June 1927, Leningrad - 4 February 2011, Munich) was a Russian writer, playwright and screenwriter. Kunin was a member of the Union of Cinematographers of the Russian Federation, the Union of Writers of Russia (Союз писателей России) as well as an honorary member of the International association of writers and publicists (Международная ассоциация писателей и публицистов).

One of his books, Intergirl (Интердевочка), first published in 1988, was adapted to become a highly popular Soviet movie in 1989 (see Intergirl).

== Works ==
=== Books ===
- Intergirl, 1988, English ed. 1991
- Ivanov i Rabinovich, ili "Ay gou tu Hayfa"
- Hronika pikiruyuschego bombardirovschika (Chronicle of the dive bomber) (in Russian). 2003. ISBN 5-17-017805-0.
- Tolchok vosem' ballov
- Coupe Dvukhmestnoe kupe
- Кыся в Голливуде / Kysia v Gollivude (Kysya in Hollywood). ISBN 5755900299.
- Emigratsiia: Dve povesti i roman (emigration: two stories and a novel). 1994. ISBN 5879490211.
- Russkie khroniki (Russian chronicles) (in Russian). Novyĭ Gelikon. 1994. ISBN 5879490173.
- Russkie na Marienplats (Russians on Marienplatz). ISBN 5957800678., (movie adaptation: 2022)
- Noch s Angelom (Night with Angel) (in Russian). AST, Tranzitkniga. 2003. ISBN 5957802824.

=== Screenplay ===
- Rebro Adama (Adam's rib), 1990
