= Vladimir Motyl =

Soviet-Belarusian director and screenwriter

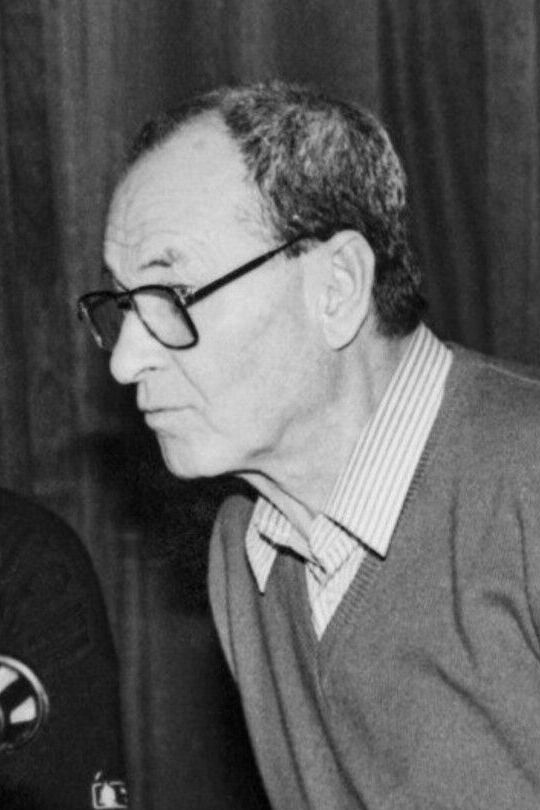
- Born: 26 June 1927; Lepiel, Byelorussian SSR, Soviet Union
- Died: 21 February 2010 (aged 82); Moscow, Russia
- Occupations: Film director, theatre director, screenwriter
- Years active: 1963–2010
- Notable work: White Sun of the Desert (1970)
- Title: People's Artist of Russia (2003)

Vladimir Yakovlevich Motyl (Russian: Влади́мир Я́ковлевич Моты́ль; 26 June 1927 – 21 February 2010) was a Soviet and Russian film director and screenwriter.

Vladimir Motyl was born in Lepiel, Belarus. His father was a Polish émigré, who was arrested in 1930 and sent to Solovki and died there the following year. Many of his other relatives suffered similar treatment. Vladimir and his mother were exiled to the Northern Urals, where he became fascinated in theatre and cinema, and later graduated from the Sverdlovsk Theatrical Institute. For about 10 years he worked in various theatres in the Urals and Siberia and eventually became chief director of Sverdlovsk Young Spectator's Theatre.

He decided to start afresh in cinema, despite having no technical qualifications. Eventually he directed his first film, Children of Pamirs (1963) (Detyi Pamira/Дети Памира) in Tajikistan. This work was met with public success, as well as earning him the State Prize of Tajik SSR (1964), and the title of honorary citizen of Dushanbe (1977).

His next film Zhenya, Zhenechka and Katyusha (1967) (Женя, Женечка и "Катюша"), a romantic comedy/drama set in 1944, was warmly accepted by the public as well, but earned the displeasure of the Soviet agitprop for "disrespectful" treatment of the Second World War theme, and the director fell into disfavor.

Nevertheless, he was invited to direct a film which was to become one of the most popular Soviet cult films, the "Red Western" (or technically, "Ostern") White Sun of the Desert. Notably, this film has a strong theme about exile, as its protagonist, Sukhov finds himself waylaid in Central Asia when trying to return home.

For his work, Motyl received numerous awards.

== Filmography ==
- 1963: Children of Pamirs (Дети Памира), film director
- 1967: Zhenya, Zhenechka and Katyusha (Женя, Женечка и Катюша), playwright, film director
- 1969: White Sun of the Desert (Белое солнце пустыни), film director
- 1975: The Captivating Star of Happiness (Звезда пленительного счастья) (the title is a line from a verse by Pushkin), playwright, film director
- 1980: Forest (Лес), playwright, film director
- 1984: Unbelievable Bet (Невероятное пари), film director
- 1987: My Best Respects (Честь имею), playwright
- 1991: Let's Part while we're alright (Расстанемся, пока хорошие), playwright, film director
- 1993: Okhlamon (Охламон), playwright, play director
- 1996: Nesut menya koni (Несут меня кони), playwright, film director, music for the songs
- 2009: Crimson Colour of the Snowfall (Багровый цвет снегопада), playwright, film director, music for the songs

== Awards ==
- 1996:Order of Honour for the film White Sun of the Desert
- 1998: State Prize of the Russian Federation category Literature and Arts for year 1997, for the film White Sun of the Desert
- 2003: Honorary title of People's Artist of Russian Federation

== Death ==
On 5 February 2010, Vladimir Motyl was at home alone when he felt ill. On the same day he was hospitalized in the city clinical hospital No. 67. Initially, he was suspected of a stroke, but in the hospital doctors found a fracture of the cervical vertebrae and pneumonia.

On 21 February 2010 at approximately 11 pm Vladimir Motyl died at the age of 83.
