= Oleg Dal =

Soviet actor

- Олег Даль
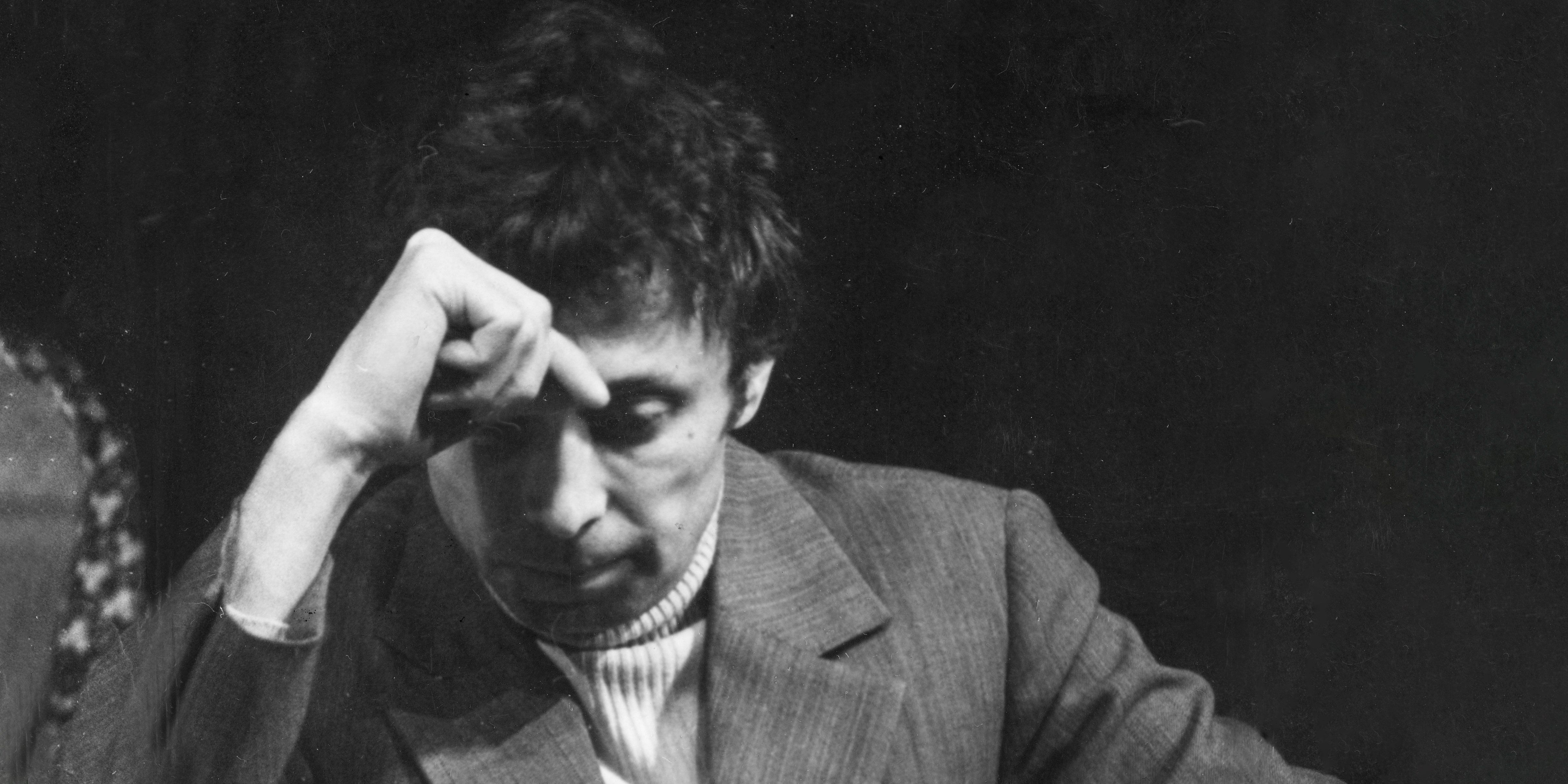
- Dal on a 2016 Russian postcard
- Born: Oleg Ivanovich Dal; 25 May 1941; Moscow, Russian SFSR, USSR
- Died: 3 March 1981 (aged 39); Kiev, Ukrainian SSR, USSR
- Occupations: Actor, poet, dramatist
- Years active: 1962–1981

Oleg Ivanovich Dal (Russian: Олег Иванович Даль; 25 May 1941 – 3 March 1981) was a Soviet Russian stage and film actor.

He acted in films, from classics of drama to fairy tales and adventures. His most popular works included Zhenya, Zhenechka and Katyusha (1967), Chronicles of a Dive Bomber (1967), An Old, Old Tale (1970), King Lear (1971), On Thursday and Never Again (1977), September Vacation (1979). Dal played his last cinema role in Uninvited Friend by Leonid Maryagin in 1981.

He worked in the Sovremennik Theatre (1963–1971, 1973–1975) and in the Malaia Bronnaia Theatre (1975–1978).

== Early life and education ==
Oleg Dal was born on 25 May 1941 in Lyublino, Moscow Oblast (presently Lyublino District, Moscow). His father, Ivan Zinovyevich Zherko (Иван Зиновьевич Жерко), was an engineer, and mother, Praskovya Petrovna, was a teacher. Zherko changed his surname to Dal (Даль). In 1959, Oleg Dal graduated from high school and entered the Mikhail Shchepkin Higher Theatre School at the State Academic Maly Theater (course of Nikolay Annenkov), from which he graduated in 1963.

== Acting career ==
=== Theatre ===
After graduation, he was invited to the Sovremennik Theatre, where he worked on and off until 1976. During the first five years, Dal played only minor roles: Henry in The Naked King, Mishka in Eternally Living, Cyril in The Elder Sister, Dwarf Thursday in Snow White and the Seven Dwarfs (all the performances were staged in 1963), Marquis Brisail in Cyrano de Bergerac (1964), Igor in Always on Sale (1965), Pospelov in Ordinary History (1966), episode in The Decembrists (1967).

Over the years, Dal's position in the theater did not improve, roles became fewer. Soon he left the Sovremennik, but then came back again and received the first significant role – Vaska Ashes in Maxim Gorky's The Lower Depths (the premiere of the performance took place in 1968).

In 1971, after leaving the troupe of the Sovremennik Theater again, he left for Leningrad, where he entered the Lenkom Theatre and for two seasons played Dvoinikov in the play Choice based on Aleksei Arbuzov's play.

In mid-1973, he left the Leningrad Lenkom troupe and agreed to return to Sovremennik, where he received the roles of Balalaikin in Balalaikin and K. Gusev in Valentin and Valentina, Kamaev in Provincial Anecdotes, and others.

In March 1976 Dal was fired from Sovremennik for systematic violations of labor discipline. After leaving Sovremennik, the actor decided to devote himself to directing and entered the High Courses for Scriptwriters and Film Directors at the VGIK in the studio of Iosif Kheifits, but did not finish them.

In 1976, Dal came to the Theater headed by Anatoly Efros on Malaya Bronnaya. In this team he worked only two years, playing two roles there – Belyaev in the play A Month in the Country and an investigator in the play Veranda in the Forest. In the autumn of 1978, he left the theater in Malaya Bronnaya and joined the Maly Theater troupe, where he was introduced to the role of Alex in the play "The Coast" by Yuri Bondarev. In early 1981, Dal actively rehearsed the role of Yezhov in the production of the Maly Theater Foma Gordeev.

Between 1980 and 1981 Dal taught acting at VGIK.

=== Film ===
Dal became widely popular with his roles in film. His cinematic debut took place in 1962, when he was still a student. He played one of the main roles in the film directed by Alexander Zarkhi My Younger brother, based on Vasily Aksyonov's novel Star Ticket.

Then there were the films The First Trolleybus (Sanya, 1963), Zhenya, Zhenechka and Katyusha (Zhenya Kolyshkin, 1967), Chronicles of a Dive Bomber (Eugene Sobolevsky), An Old, Old Tale (soldier and puppeteer), King Lear (Jester, 1970), Shadow (Christian Theodore and his shadow, 1971), Bad Good Man (Ivan Laevsky, 1973), The Land of Sannikov (Yevgeny Krestovsky), Omega (Scorin / Paul Krieger), It Can't Be! (Barygin-Amursky), Alternative, Ordinary Arctic (Anton Semenovich, 1976), Personal Happiness (Kanavkin, 1977), Holidays in September ( Zilov, 1979), The Suicide Club, or the Adventures of a Titled Person (Prince Florizel, 1980), Uninvited Friend (Victor Sviridov, 1981) and others.

He starred in Anatoly Efros's television productions: On the pages of the Pechorin magazine (Grigory Alexandrovich Pechorin) and Islands in the ocean (messenger).

== Death ==
Dal died from a heart attack, on 3 March 1981, in his hotel room in Kiev, apparently in his sleep. He was buried in Vagankovo Cemetery in Moscow. In 1987, at the XII All-Union Film Festival Dal was awarded posthumously Prize for the best performance of the role in the film Holidays in September.

== Personal life ==
Dal was married three times: his first wife was actress Nina Doroshina, the second was actress Tatyana Lavrova; and the third was Elizabeth Eichenbaum, whom he met on the set of the film King Lear. She was grand daughter of Boris Eichenbaum.

Dal wrote verses that were put down and preserved in his diaries and personal correspondence.

== Filmography ==
- My Younger Brother (1962) as Alik Kramer
- The First Trolleybus (1963) as Senya
- The Bridge Is Built (1966) as Yulian
- Zhenya, Zhenechka and Katyusha (1967) as Zhenya Kolyshkin
- Chronicles of a Dive Bomber (1968) as Yevgeni Sobolevski
- An Old, Old Tale (1968) as Soldat i kukolnik
- King Lear (1970–1971) as jester of the king Lear
- Shadow (1971) as Scientist / His Shadow
- The Land of Sannikov (1973) as Yevgeny Krestovsky
- The Bad Good Man (1973) as Layevski
- Variant "Omega" (1975, TV Mini-Series) as Sergey Nikolayevich Skorin
- It Can't Be! (1975) as Anatoly (Anatole) Barygin-Amurskiy
- The Captivating Star of Happiness (1975) as nachalnik karaula v Petropavlovskoy kreposti
- Town People (1976) as passenger
- How Ivanushka the Fool Travelled in Search of Wonder (1977) as Ivanushka, durachok
- Golden Mine (1978) as Kosov
- On Thursday and Never Again (1978) as Sergey
- September Vacation (1979) as Zilov
- The Suicide Club, or the Adventures of a Titled Person (1979, TV Movie) as Prince Florisel
- We Looked in the Death's Face (1980) as Boris Korbut
- Uninvited Friend (1981) as Viktor Sviridov (final film role)
