= The Star of Captivating Happiness =

1975 film

- Directed by: Vladimir Motyl
- Written by: Vladimir Motyl; Oleg Osetinsky; Mark Zakharov
- Starring: Igor Kostolevsky; Irina Kupchenko; Aleksey Batalov; Natalya Bondarchuk; Oleg Strizhenov
- Cinematography: Dmitriy Meshiev
- Edited by: Ye. Sadovskaya
- Music by: Isaak Schwarz
- Production company: Lenfilm
- Release date: November 11, 1975
- Running time: 167 min.
- Country: Soviet Union
- Language: Russian

The Star of Captivating Happiness (Russian: «Звезда пленительного счастья», romanized: Zvezda plenitelnogo schastya) is a 1975 Soviet historical romance. The title is an allusion to a line from the poem To Chaadayev by Alexander Pushkin. It is a drama with the dedication "to the women of Russia".

== Plot ==
The story is set in the aftermath of the Decembrist revolt against Tsar Nicholas I in 1825. The revolt is suppressed, the investigation proceeds, and five Decembrists are executed. Other military officers involved are sentenced to exile in Siberia, leaving their wives, known as the Decembrists' women (Dekabristki), to decide whether to follow them.

In the center of the plot is the fate of Decembrist Ivan Annenkov and his beloved, French seamstress Polina Gueble, whose exile to Siberia unexpectedly provides a chance for them to find happiness together. Polina, without title or wealth, works in a fashionable shop in Moscow, and their marriage would have been impossible before the uprising. After Annenkov’s arrest, trial, and sentence to exile, Polina relentlessly pursues permission to join him, ultimately overcoming resistance from Annenkov’s proud mother and the emperor himself. Alongside Polina are Ekaterina Trubetskaya, who fights for the right to join her husband, Sergei Trubetskoy, out of deep mutual love, and Maria Volkonskaya, who follows her husband to Siberia despite having married him under family pressure. Through flashbacks, the film recounts moments of the Decembrists' lives, including the uprising, trial, and consequences, all while highlighting the sacrifices and resolve of these remarkable women.

== Cast ==
- Irina Kupchenko as Princess Ekaterina Ivanovna Trubetskaya
- Aleksey Batalov as Prince Sergei Trubetskoy
- Natalya Bondarchuk as Princess Mariya Volkonskaya
- Oleg Strizhenov as Prince Sergey Volkonsky
- Ewa Szykulska as Polina Göbl-Annenkova, in marriage Praskovya Yegorovna
- Igor Kostolevsky as Ivan Aleksandrovich Annenkov, Decembrist, cavalergard
- Lev Ivanov as Nikolay Raevsky, a general from the cavalry (not in the credits)
- Raisa Kurkina as Sofya Alekseevna Raevskaya, the wife of NN Raevsky
- Tatyana Pankova as Anna Annenkova, the mother of IA Annenkov
- Aleksandr Porokhovshchikov as Pavel Pestel
- Victor Kostetskiy as Pyotr Kakhovsky
- Yuri Rodionov as Sergey Muravyov-Apostol
- Oleg Yankovsky as Kondraty Ryleyev
- Tatyana Fedorova as Natalia Ryleeva, the wife of KF Ryleev
- Vasily Livanov as Emperor Nicholas I
- Innokenty Smoktunovsky as Ivan Bogdanovich Zeidler, Irkutsk Governor
- Vladislav Strzhelchik as Count Laval
- Dmitry Shilko as Count Mikhail Miloradovich, St. Petersburg Governor-General
- Igor Dmitriev as Count Lebzeltern, Austrian Envoy in St. Petersburg
- Boris Dubensky as Emperor Alexander I
- Victor Terekhov as Vasily Vasilyevich Levashov, Adjutant-General
- Vadim Makarovsky as Vosh
- Arkady Trusov as Fedor, valet Annenkov
- Mikhail Kokshenov as Nikita, servant of Annenkov-senior
- Aleksei Kozhevnikov as Paphnutius, servant of Zeidler

== Production ==
After making the 1970 hit film White Sun of the Desert, Motyl received no directorial projects for five years.

When Motyl got the green light from Goskino to make a film about the Decembrists, he still had problems and had to do many rewrites because the authorities believed that the picture had too many parallels with the Soviet regime and allusions to Soviet dissidents.

Nevertheless, the screenplay was rejected. Then Motyl went to Leningrad, to the regional party committee. He handed the script to the secretary on ideology; the woman did not have time to read it and instead gave the text to her daughter who ended up adoring it. The mother called Filipp Yermash, Soviet Minister of Cinematography and declared that "The Leningrad Regional Committee is interested in the film about the Decembrists!" Thus the script reached Lenfilm, but the budget was cut to 1.5 million rubles from the initial 3.5 million.

Filming locations included Peterhof and the Winter Palace.
