= With You and Without You =

- Russian: С тобой и без тебя
- Directed by: Rodion Nakhapetov
- Written by: Aleksandr Popov; Mikhail Zhestev
- Starring: Marina Neyolova; Juozas Budraitis; Stanislav Borodokin; Mayya Bulgakova; Vladimir Zeldin
- Cinematography: Sergey Zaytsev
- Edited by: L. Dzhanazyan
- Music by: Bogdan Trotsyuk
- Release date: 1973
- Country: Soviet Union
- Language: Russian

With You and Without You (Russian: С тобой и без тебя, tr. S toboy i bez tebya) is a 1973 Soviet drama film directed by Rodion Nakhapetov.

The film takes place during the formation of Soviet power. The rich farmer Fedor marries his girlfriend. But it is difficult for her to get used to the farm life and she decides to return to her native village.

== Plot ==
Stesha (Marina Neyolova), a carefree and cheerful village girl, enjoys a simple life with her loving mother (Maya Bulgakova) and her fiancé, Ivan Sukhanov (Stanislav Borodokin), a dedicated activist in the local agricultural cooperative. However, Ivan’s constant involvement in community matters leaves little time for the couple to be together. Unbeknownst to him, Stesha has caught the attention of Fyodor Bazyrin (Juozas Budraitis), a brooding resident of a distant homestead, whose growing infatuation for her culminates in an audacious act. One day, Fyodor kidnaps Stesha, taking her to his home despite her protests. Initially enraged, Stesha destroys his belongings in a fit of anger but is gradually disarmed by his sincere confessions through the night. The next morning, when Ivan arrives with the police to rescue her, Stesha surprises everyone by declaring that she is now Stepanida Bazyrina, having chosen to stay with Fyodor.

Fyodor’s gestures of affection begin to win Stesha over. On a trip to the market, he buys her gifts—dresses, shoes, and scarves—lavishing her with attention in a way she has never experienced before. Touched, Stesha starts to adapt to her new life on the homestead, though isolation weighs heavily on her. She spends long autumn and winter days gazing out the window, feeling cut off from the world. In the summers, however, she finds joy in running the household and embracing her role. Yet, their peace is overshadowed by rumors that Fyodor will be exiled if the family refuses to join the collective farm. Despite this looming threat, Stesha begins to assert her independence, finding a new sense of agency in her life with Fyodor. A visit to her old village to show off her new outfits leads to an emotional encounter with Ivan, where she firmly explains her decision to live her own life on her terms.

Tensions escalate when the couple is summoned to a cooperative meeting. At the gathering, Ivan accuses Fyodor of resisting collectivization, prompting Stesha to defend her husband and her newfound identity as a mistress of her home. However, Fyodor, feeling increasingly cornered by the pressures of the village and collective farm, begins hiding livestock and household items in the forest. This creates friction between him and Stesha, leading to a heated argument that drives her to return to her mother’s home in the village. Left behind, Fyodor is haunted by memories of their brief happiness. Unable to bear her absence, he ultimately abandons his homestead and follows her, driven by the hope of reconciliation.

== Cast ==
- Marina Neyolova as Stesha
- Juozas Budraitis as Fedor Bazyrin
- Stanislav Borodokin as Ivan
- Mayya Bulgakova as Darya - Stesha's Mother
- Vladimir Zeldin as Yevstigney - Fyodor's Father
- Ivan Kosykh as Grishka
- Nikolai Pastukhov as Roman
- Valentin Zubkov as Investigator
- Viktor Kosykh as Militiaman
- Nikolay Gorlov as Countryman
