= An Umbrella for Lovers =

- Russian: Зонтик для новобрачных
- Directed by: Rodion Nakhapetov
- Written by: Ramiz Fataliyev
- Starring: Aleksey Batalov; Nijolė Oželytė-Vaitiekūnienė; Vera Glagoleva; Nikita Mikhaylovsky
- Cinematography: Vladimir Shevtsik
- Edited by: Polina Skachkova
- Music by: Isaac Schwartz
- Production company: Mosfilm
- Release date: October 13, 1986
- Running time: 89 min.
- Country: Soviet Union
- Language: Russian

An Umbrella for Lovers (Russian: Зонтик для новобрачных, romanized: Zontik dlya novobrachnykh) is a 1986 Soviet romantic drama film directed by Rodion Nakhapetov.

== Plot ==
The film begins in autumn on the Crimean coast in Sudak, then moves to Moscow and concludes on New Year's Day. Zoya and Tolya, two young lovers, meet a married couple—addiction specialist Dmitry Pavlovich and lab technician Vera Ivanovna—while on vacation by the sea. They ask to spend the night at the couple’s house, where Dmitry and Vera are staying, and come to admire them as an ideal: a happy marriage, three children, and complete mutual understanding after many years together.

As the vacation ends, Zoya and Tolya leave, only to discover that Dmitry Pavlovich's image of marital bliss is a myth. In reality, he is married to another woman and has secretly met with his true love for years.

Several months later, Vera receives a telegram from their vacation acquaintances, who plan to visit and celebrate New Year's together. Not wanting to shatter the illusion, Vera persuades Dmitry to once again play the role of a happy family for their young friends.

== Cast ==
- Aleksey Batalov as Dmitriy Pavlovich Kraskov
- Nijolė Oželytė-Vaitiekūnienė as Vera (voiced by Inna Churikova)
- Vera Glagoleva as Zoya
- Nikita Mikhaylovsky as Tolya
- Vyacheslav Ezepov as Yuriy
- Igor Nefyodov as Gosha
- Alla Meshcheryakova as Kraskov's wife
- Galina Petrova as Lida
- Galina Dyomina as Vera's mother
- Vladimir Nosik as Frolikov

== Criticism ==
Alexander Fedorov noted in his review: "Aleksey Batalov, preserving in the image of his hero all the charm of Gosha from the memorable melodrama "Moscow Does Not Believe in Tears", plays the drama of a strong personality, a talented, witty man, who is unable to make a choice. Dmitry Pavlovich is tired of the dual "conspiratorial" life, but his love for children does not allow him to break out of the vicious circle... Rodion Nakhapetov's melodrama is staged psychologically ambiguously and subtly..."
