= Nijolė Oželytė-Vaitiekūnienė =

Lithuanian actress

Nijolė Oželytė-Vaitiekūnienė (born 31 March 1954 in Vilnius) is a Lithuanian actress. In 1990, she was one of the signatories of the Act of the Re-Establishment of the State of Lithuania.

In 1996, she was elected as a deputy of the Seimas of the Republic of Lithuania on the party list of the Homeland Union (Lithuanian Conservatives).

== Filmography ==
- 1974 Ievutė – Žvangutis, dir. Gytis Lukšas
- 1976 Frida – Seklio Kalio nuotykiai, dir. Arūnas Žebriūnas
- 1977 Stasė – Vaikinas iš Darbo gatvės, rež. Algirdas Dausa
- 1978 Dela – Nebūsiu gangsteris, brangioji, rež. Algimantas Puipa
- 1978 Rubė Adam – Veidas taikinyje, rež. Almantas Grikevičius
- 1979 Briun – Dead Mountaineer's Hotel, dir. Grigori Kromanov
- 1980 Adelė – Dičiaus karjera, dir. Balys Bratkauskas
- 1980 Bušė – Kelionė į rojų, dir. Arūnas Žebriūnas
- 1980 Maksimova – Aliarmas, dir. Jevgenijus Makarovas
- 1981 Airinė – Raudonmedžio rojus, 5 serijos, dir. Bronius Talačka
- 1981 Bertina – Amerikietiška tragedija, dir. Marijonas Giedrys
- 1981 Kamilė – Arkliavagio duktė, dir. Algimantas Puipa
- 1982 Inga – Atsiprašau, dir. Vytautas Žalakevičius
- 1983 Stasė – Jo žmonos išpažintis, dir. Almantas Grikevičius
- 1984 Ana Zaiceva – Du husarai, dir. Viačeslavas Krištofovičius
- 1984 Helga Vedekind – Veik pagal situaciją, dir. Ivanas Gorobecas
- 1984 Rožytė – Čia mūsų namai, dir. Saulius Vosylius
- 1985 Ana – Legenda apie nemirtingumą, dir. Borisas Savčenko
- 1986 Jelena Tarasova – Tik vienas posūkis, dir. Aleksandras Grišinas
- 1986 Vera – An Umbrella for Lovers, rež. Rodion Nakhapetov
- 1987 Katerina Zinkevič – Norite – mylėkite, norite – ne…, dir. Vladimiras Kolosas
- 1989 Marusia – Pabaiga, dir. Nikolajus Košeliovas
- 2005 Klara Dalrympl – Zebriukas Dryžius
