= Do Not Shoot at White Swans =

Do not Shoot at White Swans
- DVD cover
- Directed by: Rodion Nakhapetov
- Written by: Kirill Rapoport; Boris Vasilyev
- Starring: Stanislav Lyubshin; Nina Ruslanova; Vladimir Zamansky; Viktor Anisimov; Vera Glagoleva; Ivars Kalnins
- Cinematography: Nikolay Nemolyayev
- Music by: Isaac Schwartz
- Production company: Mosfilm
- Release date: 1980
- Running time: 136 minutes
- Country: Soviet Union
- Language: Russian

Do not Shoot at White Swans (Russian: Не стреляйте в белых лебедей, romanized: Ne strelyayte v belykh lebedey) is a 1980 Soviet drama film in two parts by the director Rodion Nakhapetov, based on the novel of the same name by Boris Vasilyev.

== Plot ==
Egor Polushkin (Stanislav Lyubshin) lives in a village. The villagers, including his wife, nickname him as the "Harbinger of Woes" - for all for what he undertakes, any work or business ends in disaster.

Egor is quite different from the villagers, which are practical and sensible. Polushkin is endowed with the talent of a true artist, with his own outlook on life. After a long search, Polushkin finally finds his calling - he gets a job as a gamekeeper. White swans become Yegor's only friends, of which he takes care of with utmost tenderness. But one day his luck ends: to the forest come poachers who without hesitation kill the tame swans.

== Cast ==
- Stanislav Lyubshin
- Nina Ruslanova
- Vladimir Zamansky
- Viktor Anisimov
- Vera Glagoleva
- Ivars Kalnins
- Ivan Agafonov
- Yevgeni Nikitchenko
- Nastasya Gladkova
- Grigori Shpigel
- Anatoli Vedenkin
- Lyubov Sokolova
- Konstantin Grigoryev
