= Alexander Ovechkin =

Russian ice hockey player (born 1985)

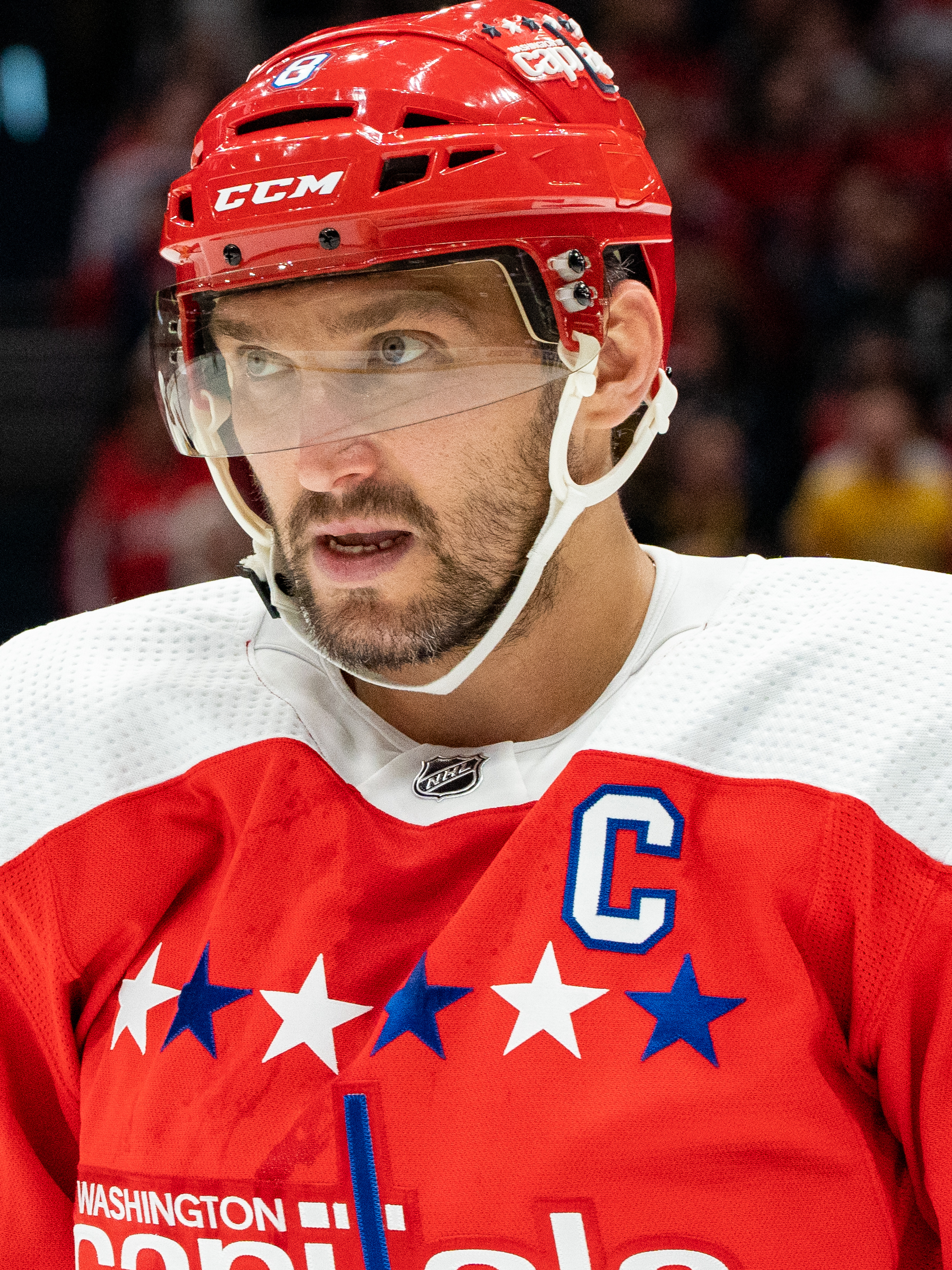
- Ovechkin with the Washington Capitals in February 2020
- Born: 17 September 1985 (age 41) Moscow, Russian SFSR, Soviet Union
- Height: 6 ft 3 in (191 cm)
- Weight: 238 lb (108 kg; 17 st 0 lb)
- Position: Left wing
- Shoots: Right
- NHL team Former teams: Washington Capitals; Dynamo Moscow
- National team: Russia
- NHL draft: 1st overall, 2004; Washington Capitals
- Playing career: 2001–present

Alexander Mikhailovich Ovechkin (Russian: Алексaндр Михайлович Овечкин, romanized: Aleksandr Mikhaylovich Ovechkin, pronounced [ɐlʲɪˈksandr ɐˈvʲetɕkʲɪn]; born 17 September 1985) is a Russian professional ice hockey player who is a left winger and captain for the Washington Capitals of the National Hockey League (NHL). Nicknamed "the Great 8" (in reference to his jersey number) and "Ovi", as well as "Alexander the Great" (Russian: Александр Великий) by Russian media, Ovechkin has scored the most career goals in NHL regular season history, and is the only player in NHL history to have scored 900 regular season goals.

Ovechkin began his professional career with Dynamo Moscow of the Russian Superleague in 2001, playing there for four seasons. Ovechkin was selected by the Capitals first overall in the 2004 NHL entry draft. In the 2005–06 season, Ovechkin captured the Calder Memorial Trophy as rookie of the year and finished third overall in league scoring.

Ovechkin has won the Maurice "Rocket" Richard Trophy as the NHL's leading goal scorer a record nine times and been runner-up once. He holds the NHL record for most 40-goal seasons with fourteen, and shares with Mike Bossy and Wayne Gretzky the record for most 50-goal campaigns with nine. He is the only player to have tallied 200 or more goals in three different decades, with 245 in the 2000s, 437 in the 2010s, and 247 in the 2020s. He also holds multiple other NHL records, including the most power play goals, most goals in away games, most overtime goals, most game-winning goals, most individual goalies scored upon, and most goals with one team.

He has won the Hart Memorial Trophy for most valuable player three times (in 2008, 2009, and 2013) while also being a finalist two other times (2010 and 2015), and the award for best player as voted on by the National Hockey League Players' Association three times (2008, 2009, and 2010) while also being a finalist two other times (2013 and 2015). In 2018, the Capitals won the Stanley Cup for the first time, and Ovechkin was awarded the Conn Smythe Trophy for most valuable player in the 2018 playoffs. He has also been named to the NHL first All-Star team eight times, and the second All-Star team four times. In 2017, Ovechkin was named one of the 100 Greatest NHL Players of all time.

Internationally, Ovechkin has represented Russia in multiple tournaments. His first International Ice Hockey Federation (IIHF) tournament was the 2002 World U18 Championship. The following year he made his debut at the World Junior Championship, helping Russia win the gold medal. He played two more years at the World Juniors, as well as once more at the World U18 Championships. Ovechkin's first senior tournament was the 2004 World Championship, and he also played in the World Cup that year. Ovechkin has also played for Russia at the Winter Olympics in 2006, 2010, and 2014. Overall, Ovechkin has represented Russia at thirteen World Championships and three Winter Olympics in his career, winning the World Championship three times.

== Early life ==
Ovechkin was born on 17 September 1985 in Moscow, the son of Soviet athletes. His mother, Tatyana Ovechkina, is a two-time Olympic gold medalist (1976, 1980) and world champion (1975) in basketball. His father, Mikhail, was a soccer player. His mother sensed her youngest son was destined for "sporting greatness". "From birth, it was obvious," she said. "In a child, it's clear immediately. He was very active and walking and curious." His favorite NHL team growing up was the San Jose Sharks and also was the first NHL jersey he received. He was two years old when he first picked up a hockey stick. Whenever a hockey game came on television, he would drop whatever he was doing, refusing to allow his parents to change the channel.

In early childhood, he moved with his family to a high-rise building surrounded by a "crumbling neighborhood" on the outskirts of Moscow. There he attended public school No. 596, infamous for military discipline and a "tyrannical" principal, completing eight and a half grades before starting at Dynamo Moscow's sports school. (Note: The development program of Dynamo Moscow of the Russian Superleague (RSL).) While he saw his friends "getting high and getting dead," Ovechkin was attending daily training sessions morning and night. "You dive into sport with your head and arms and legs, and there's no time for anything else," he said of this early training.

Whenever his parents were no longer able to get young Alex to hockey events, his elder brother Sergei stepped up, making sure his little brother got where he needed to go. When Ovechkin was 10, Sergei died of a blood clot following a car accident. Ovechkin had a youth hockey game the next day, which his parents insisted he play in. Ovechkin credits his elder brother Sergei for introducing him to hockey and encouraging him to pursue it. When he scores, Ovechkin will often kiss his glove and point to the sky in a salute to his brother.

Ovechkin established his reputation within the Dynamo Moscow system by scoring 56 goals at the age of 11, surpassing the previous record held by Pavel Bure, who had scored 53 goals. Meanwhile, Ovechkin dreamed of playing in the NHL, keeping the cards of star players stashed in his room, especially those of his idol, Mario Lemieux. "It's the best hockey there is," Ovechkin would say of the NHL.

== Playing career ==
=== Dynamo Moscow (2001–2005) ===
Ovechkin began playing in the Russian Super League (RSL) for Dynamo Moscow at the age of 16. Making his professional debut in the 2001–02 season, he scored four points in 21 games. He would spend three seasons there prior to being drafted into the NHL, and he would rack up 36 goals and 32 assists in 152 career games.

The following off-season, Ovechkin was selected first overall in the 2004 NHL entry draft by the Washington Capitals. He had been projected as the first overall pick for nearly two years and had earned comparisons to Mario Lemieux. He was so highly regarded that the Florida Panthers attempted to draft him in the 2003 NHL entry draft in the ninth round, even though his birthday was two days after the cut-off (15 September 1985). Rick Dudley, the general manager of the Panthers, claimed the pick was legitimate, claiming that Ovechkin was old enough with leap years taken into consideration.

Due to the 2004–05 NHL lockout, Ovechkin remained with Dynamo for one more season. In the playoffs, he helped Dynamo win the RSL title.

With the threat of the lockout canceling another NHL season, Ovechkin signed a contract with rival Russian team Avangard Omsk. To maintain his eligibility for the NHL in the event that the lockout ended, the contract contained an out clause with a 20 July 2005 deadline. Although a new NHL collective bargaining agreement (CBA) had not yet been reached between players and owners, Ovechkin decided to opt out and signed with the Capitals on 5 August 2005. The deal was a three-year, entry-level contract worth the rookie maximum of $984,200 per season with performance-based bonuses to inflate his annual salary to as much as $3.9 million.

=== Washington Capitals (2005–present) ===
==== Debut and Calder Trophy (2005–2007) ====
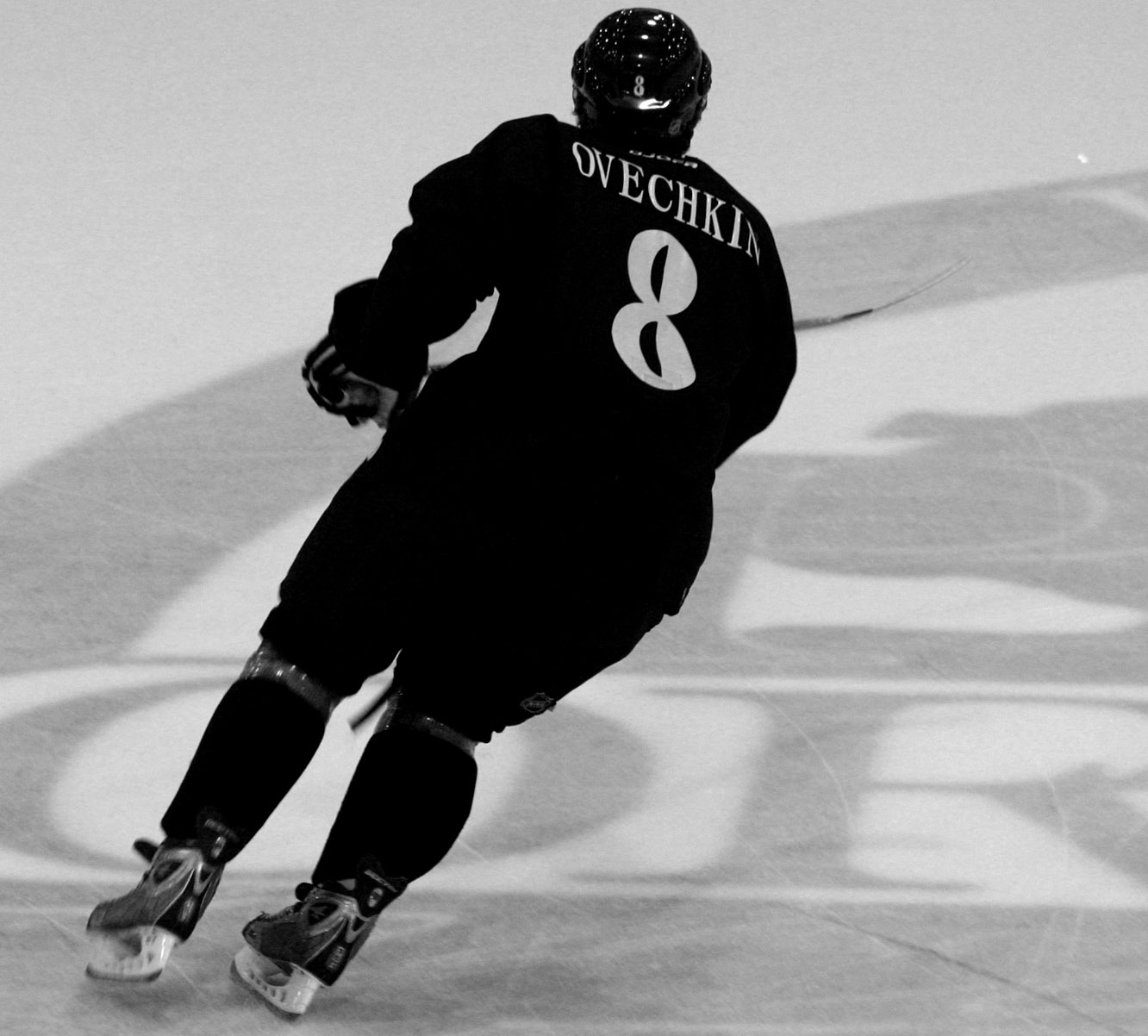
Ovechkin in September 2005 at the Washington Capitals training camp prior to the 2005–06 season

Two days after signing, the lockout ended with a new CBA. Ovechkin played his first game with the Capitals in the 2005–06 season opener on 5 October 2005, scoring two goals against goalie Pascal Leclaire in a 3–2 victory over the Columbus Blue Jackets. On 13 January 2006, in Anaheim, Ovechkin scored his first career hat trick against Jean-Sébastien Giguère of the Mighty Ducks of Anaheim to help Washington win the game. Three days later, on 16 January, he scored a goal that veteran hockey commentator Bill Clement called "one of the greatest goals of all time." Knocked down by Phoenix Coyotes defenseman Paul Mara and sliding on his back facing away from the net, Ovechkin was able to hook the puck with one hand on his stick and slide it into the net past goalie Brian Boucher for his second goal of the night. It became referred to as "The Goal." Auston Matthews, a future Toronto Maple Leafs first overall selection, was in attendance during the game; he said in an interview in November 2016, shortly into the 2016–17 season that it was the best goal he ever saw live. On 1 February, Ovechkin was named NHL Rookie of the Month for January 2006 as well as being named Offensive Player of the Month, becoming only the third player in NHL history to earn both honors simultaneously. Ovechkin finished the 2005–06 season leading all NHL rookies in goals, points, power play goals and shots. He finished third overall in the NHL in scoring with 106 points and tied for third in goals with 52 and 54 assists. His 425 shots led the league, set an NHL rookie record, and was the fourth-highest total in NHL history. Ovechkin's point total was the second-best in Washington Capitals history and his goals total tied for third in franchise history. He was also named to the NHL first All-Star team, the first rookie to receive the honor in 15 years. After the season ended, Ovechkin received the Calder Memorial Trophy, awarded to the NHL's best rookie. He was also a finalist in his rookie season for the Lester B. Pearson Award, which ultimately went to New York Rangers winger Jaromír Jágr. EA Sports made him one of the cover athletes for NHL 07.

In the 2006–07 season, Ovechkin appeared in his first NHL All-Star Game on 24 January 2007. He completed his second NHL season with 46 goals, 46 assists and 92 points in all 82 games. However, the Capitals finished last in their division for the second time in Ovechkin's two years with the team.

==== Hart Trophy wins, beginning of captaincy (2007–2013) ====
On 12 October 2007, Ovechkin scored his 100th NHL goal against goaltender Henrik Lundqvist in a 3–2 loss to the New York Rangers. Playing in the final season of his rookie contract, in 2007–08, Ovechkin signed a 13-year contract extension worth $124 million with the Capitals on 10 January 2008. The contract, which averaged $9.5 million per year, was the richest in NHL history. Working without an agent, Ovechkin negotiated with Capitals owner Ted Leonsis and former general manager George McPhee. Later in the season on 3 March against the Boston Bruins, Ovechkin notched his 50th, 51st, and 52nd goals of the campaign for his fourth career NHL hat trick and hit the 50-goal mark for the second time in his career. Later that month, on 21 March, Ovechkin scored his 59th and 60th goals of the season against the Atlanta Thrashers, becoming the first NHL player to score 60 goals in a season since Mario Lemieux and Jaromír Jágr in 1995–96, and 19th player overall. Four days later, on 25 March against the Carolina Hurricanes, Ovechkin scored his 61st goal of the season to break the Washington Capitals' team record for goals in a single season previously held by Dennis Maruk. He also went on to break Luc Robitaille's record for most goals by a left winger in one season on 3 April, by scoring two goals for his 64th and 65th of the season. He also became the first NHL player to score at least 40 even-strength goals in one season since Pavel Bure in 1999–2000. Leading the league in scoring with 65 goals, 47 assists and 112 points in all 82 games played, Ovechkin captured both the Art Ross Trophy and the Maurice "Rocket" Richard Trophy in 2007–08. It was the first time in 41 seasons that a left-winger led the NHL in points since Bobby Hull led the league with 97 points in 1965–66. Ovechkin helped lead a rejuvenated Capitals team back to the Stanley Cup playoffs for the first time since 2003 with a stronger supporting cast that included winger and countryman Alexander Semin, rookie center Nicklas Bäckström and defenseman Mike Green as the team finished third in the East. He scored the game-winning goal in his NHL playoff debut with less than five minutes left in game one of the first round of the 2008 playoffs on 11 April against the sixth-seeded Philadelphia Flyers. He scored nine points (four goals and five assists) in all seven games against the Flyers as the Capitals were eliminated in the opening round. After the season ended, Ovechkin was awarded the Lester B. Pearson Award as the most outstanding player voted by the National Hockey League Players' Association (NHLPA) and the Hart Memorial Trophy as the league's MVP, becoming the first player in the history of the NHL to win four major regular season awards, including the Art Ross and Rocket Richard trophies. Ovechkin was also awarded his third consecutive Kharlamov Trophy as the best Russian NHL player.

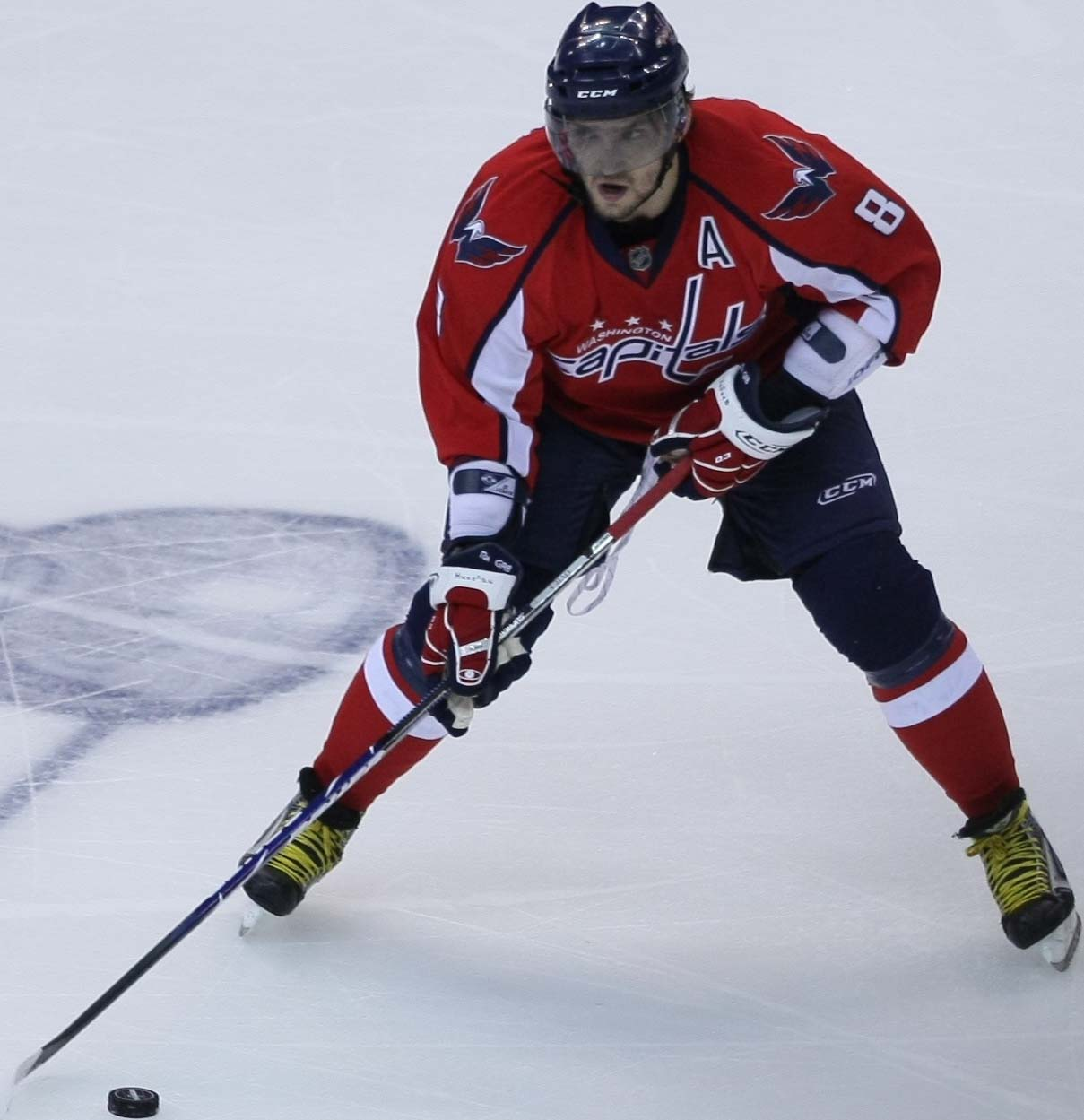
Ovechkin during the first round of the 2009 Stanley Cup playoffs. He recorded his first playoff hat trick in the second round that year.

On 27 October 2008, shortly into the 2008–09 season, Ovechkin returned home to Moscow to visit his ailing grandfather, missing only the second game of his career up to that point, ending a consecutive streak of 203 games played. On 5 February 2009, Ovechkin scored his 200th goal, against Jonathan Quick of the Los Angeles Kings, becoming only the fourth player in the NHL to reach the milestone in four seasons, joining Wayne Gretzky, Mike Bossy and Mario Lemieux. On 19 March, he scored his 50th goal of the season against the Tampa Bay Lightning, becoming the first Washington Capitals player to reach the 50-goal mark three times. He finished the campaign with 56 goals to capture his second consecutive Rocket Richard Trophy, joining Jarome Iginla and Pavel Bure as the third player to win the award twice and the second player after Bure (2000 and 2001) to win the award in back-to-back seasons. With 110 points (56 goals and 54 assists), he finished as runner-up to countryman Evgeni Malkin of the Pittsburgh Penguins for the Art Ross Trophy. Ovechkin and the Capitals repeated as division champions en route to meeting the New York Rangers in the opening round. After advancing to the second round in seven games and erasing a 3–1 series deficit against the Rangers, Ovechkin notched his first NHL playoff hat trick on 4 May, in game two against the Pittsburgh Penguins to help Washington to a 4–3 win. Sidney Crosby also scored a hat trick in game two. The Capitals were eventually defeated by Pittsburgh in seven games. Ovechkin finished the 2009 playoffs with 21 points (11 goals, 10 assists) in Washington's 14 games. He went on to win the Hart and Pearson trophies for the second consecutive year, becoming the seventeenth player in league history to win the Hart multiple times.

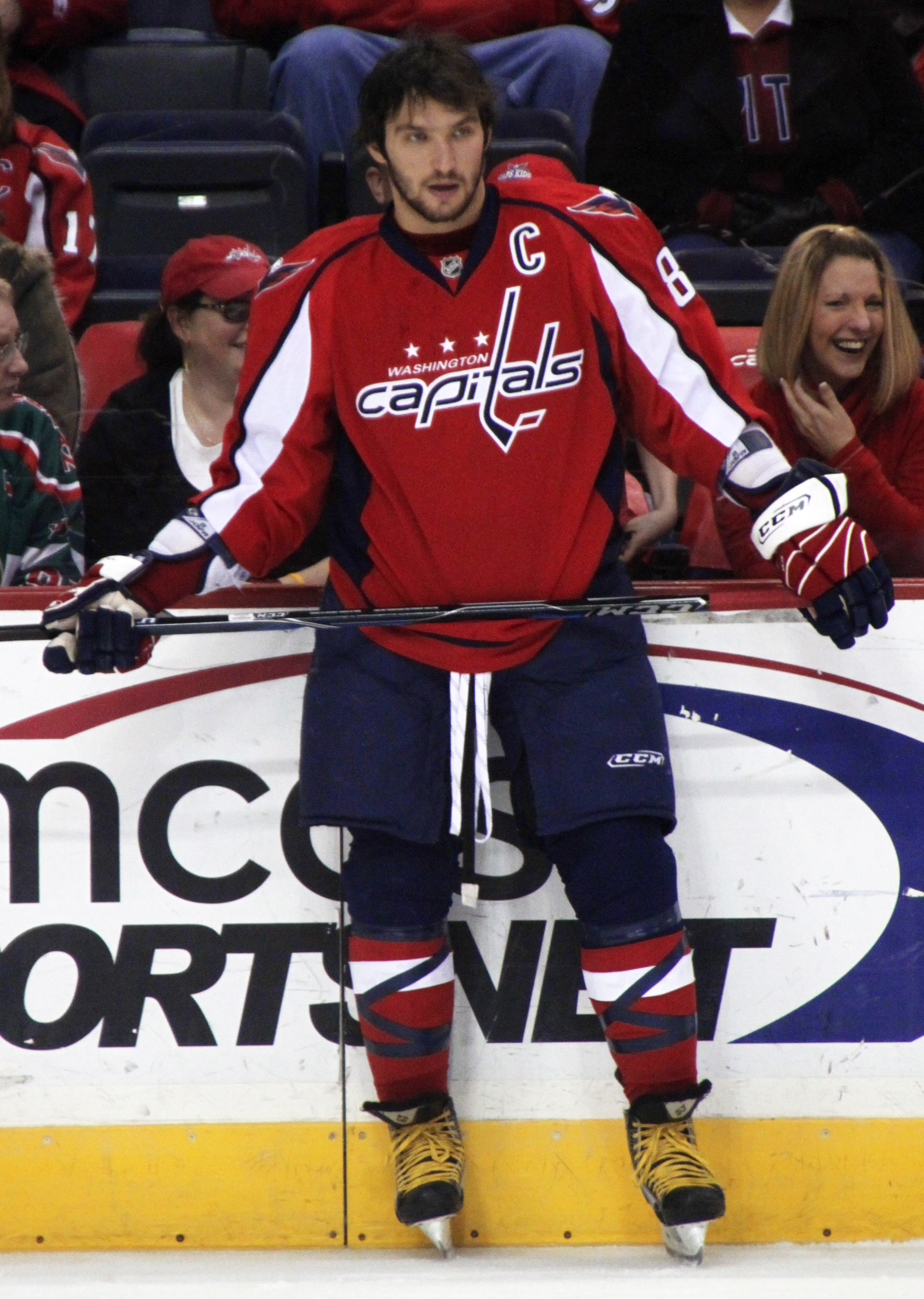
Ovechkin in January 2010. He was named the captain of the Capitals on 5 January 2010

Just over a month into the 2009–10 season, Ovechkin suffered an upper-body injury during a game against the Columbus Blue Jackets on 1 November 2009, after a collision with opposing forward Raffi Torres. After returning, Ovechkin was suspended by the NHL on 1 December for two games (one for the action, and one for a second game misconduct penalty during the season) for a knee-on-knee hit to Carolina Hurricanes defenseman Tim Gleason during a game the previous day. Both Gleason and Ovechkin had to be helped off the ice, although Gleason later returned during the game, while Ovechkin did not. Ovechkin was assessed a five-minute major penalty and a game misconduct at the time. Capitals head coach Bruce Boudreau commented that Ovechkin's style of play was at times "reckless". The suspension was Ovechkin's first of his career, causing him to forfeit $98,844.16 in salary. On 5 January 2010, Ovechkin was named captain of the Washington Capitals after previous captain Chris Clark was traded to the Columbus Blue Jackets. He became the first European, second-youngest and 14th overall captain in team history. On 5 February, at a game against the New York Rangers, Ovechkin, with his second goal and third point of the game, reached the 500-point milestone of his NHL career. He is the fifth player to achieve the milestone in only five seasons, reaching it in 373 career games. On 14 March, at a game against the Chicago Blackhawks at United Center, Ovechkin sent Blackhawks' defenseman Brian Campbell into the boards after Campbell had dumped the puck to the blue line. Ovechkin was called for boarding, receiving a five-minute major and a game misconduct, and was suspended for two games (for a third game misconduct of the season, a two-game suspension is automatic). Campbell suffered a fractured clavicle and fractured rib, and was expected to be out seven-to-eight weeks. After the season, Ovechkin won the Ted Lindsay Award, becoming the third player in NHL history to win the Pearson/Lindsay Award in three consecutive years. (Note: The Lester B. Pearson Award was renamed the Ted Lindsay Award in 2010.) He also led the NHL in goals per game and points per game for three straight seasons, from 2008 to 2010. His 50 goals made him the runner up for the Richard Trophy which went to Pittsburgh Penguins forward and captain Sidney Crosby and Tampa Bay Lightning forward Steven Stamkos who both had 51 goals for league leader(s) in goals. Ovechkin was also the runner up for the Art Ross Trophy for the second straight season (alongside Crosby with both players having 109 points) only behind Vancouver Canucks forward Henrik Sedin, who ended with 112 points. In 2009–10 Ovechkin surpassed the mark of Hall of Fame goaltender Bill Durnan (first four seasons from 1943 to 1944 through 1946–47) and became the first player in NHL history voted a First Team All-Star in each of his first five seasons. Ovechkin also recorded 10 points (five goals and assists) in the 2010 playoffs as the Capitals would lose the series in seven games to the eighth-seeded Montreal Canadiens, surrendering a 3–1 series lead in the process.

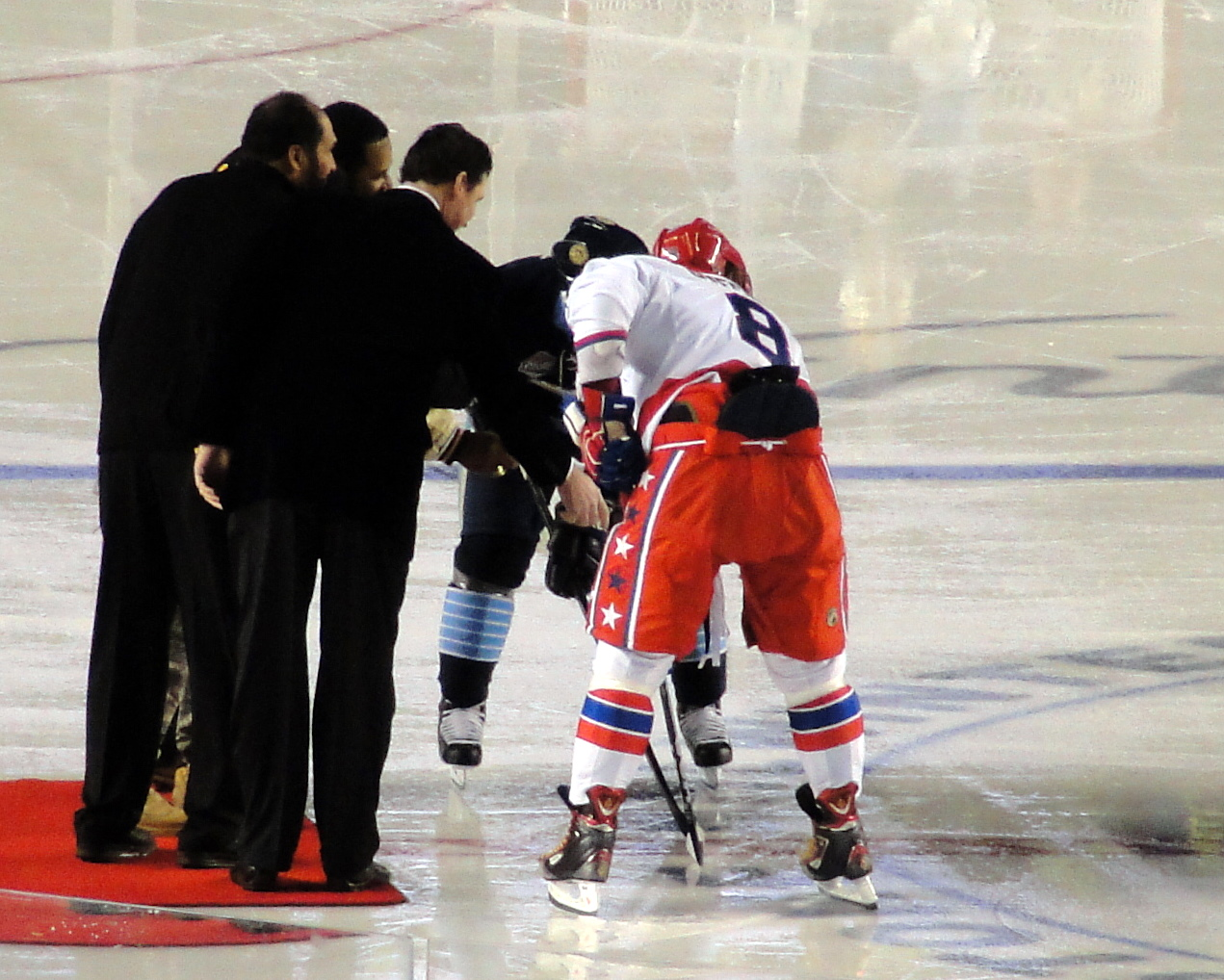
Ovechkin takes a ceremonial puck drop at the 2011 NHL Winter Classic against Pittsburgh Penguins captain Sidney Crosby.

On 1 January 2011, Ovechkin and the Capitals took part in the New Year's Day NHL Winter Classic, facing the Pittsburgh Penguins. While Ovechkin did not score any points in his first career outdoor game, the Capitals won 3–1. On 9 March, in a 5–0 victory over the Edmonton Oilers, Ovechkin recorded his 600th career point with an assist on a goal by Eric Fehr. On 5 April against the Toronto Maple Leafs, Ovechkin scored his 300th career goal against Maple Leafs goaltender James Reimer, becoming the sixth-youngest and seventh-fastest player to do so. He ended the 2010–11 season with 32 goals and 53 assists for 85 points in 79 contests. In the 2011 playoffs, Ovechkin recorded 10 points (five goals and assists) in all nine games as the top-seeded Capitals defeated the eighth-seeded New York Rangers in five games in the first round, before they were swept in the second round by the fifth-seeded Tampa Bay Lightning.

On 3 December 2011, Ovechkin played in his 500th NHL game in a 3–2 overtime win over the Ottawa Senators and ended the game with an assist recorded on a goal by Troy Brouwer. On 23 January 2012, Ovechkin received a three-game suspension for a hit on Zbyněk Michálek of the Pittsburgh Penguins. The following day, Ovechkin announced he would not attend the 2012 NHL All-Star Game due to the suspension. Ovechkin ended the 2011–12 season with 38 goals and 27 assists for 65 points in 78 games as the Capitals as a team finished as the seventh seed in the East. In the 2012 playoffs, Ovechkin and the Capitals would upset the defending Stanley Cup champion and second-seeded Boston Bruins in seven games, before falling in the second round by the top-seeded New York Rangers in seven games. He would end the playoffs with five goals and four assists for nine points in all 14 games.

During the lockout in the first half of the shortened 2012–13 season, Ovechkin went to play in the KHL and re-joined Dynamo Moscow with his teammate Nicklas Bäckström. In 31 games for the team, Ovechkin scored 19 goals, 21 assists and 40 points. At the end of the season, the Dynamo would go on to win the Gagarin Cup, albeit after the NHL lockout concluded and Ovechkin and Bäckström returned to North America in January 2013. However, Ovechkin and Bäckström still received championship rings from the team. In the abbreviated 2012–13 season, Ovechkin led the NHL in goal scoring with 32, earning him his third Rocket Richard Trophy. He also added 24 assists to give him 56 total points in all 48 games played of the season, good for third-most points in the NHL with only Tampa Bay Lightning stars Steven Stamkos and league leader Martin St. Louis ahead. In the 2013 playoffs, Ovechkin was limited to a goal and an assist for two points in all seven games as the third-seeded Capitals would lose in the first round in seven games by the sixth-seeded New York Rangers and giving up a 3–2 series lead during the series. After the season ended, he was also awarded the Hart Memorial Trophy for the third time in his career. Ovechkin was also a finalist for the Ted Lindsay Award for the fifth time in his career, which was eventually given to Pittsburgh Penguins captain and center Sidney Crosby. After the season, Ovechkin made history by being named to both the first and second NHL All-Star teams. He had switched to playing right wing that entire season and thus was voted the first All-Star team's right wing, but some voters were not aware of the change, and voted for him at his traditional left wing position, thereby also landing him at left wing on the second All-Star team.

==== Stanley Cup championship and Conn Smythe Trophy (2013–2019) ====
On 20 December 2013, in a game against the Carolina Hurricanes, Ovechkin scored into an empty net for his 400th career goal. He became the sixth-fastest player to ever reach that mark, getting it in 634 games, one fewer than Pavel Bure. At the conclusion of the 2013–14 season, Ovechkin had the strange distinction of winning the Maurice "Rocket" Richard Trophy, scoring 51 goals, while going −35, one of the NHL's worst, in the plus-minus statistic. However, the Capitals missed the 2014 playoffs by three points, marking the first time since 2006–07 where Ovechkin and the Capitals missed the playoffs.

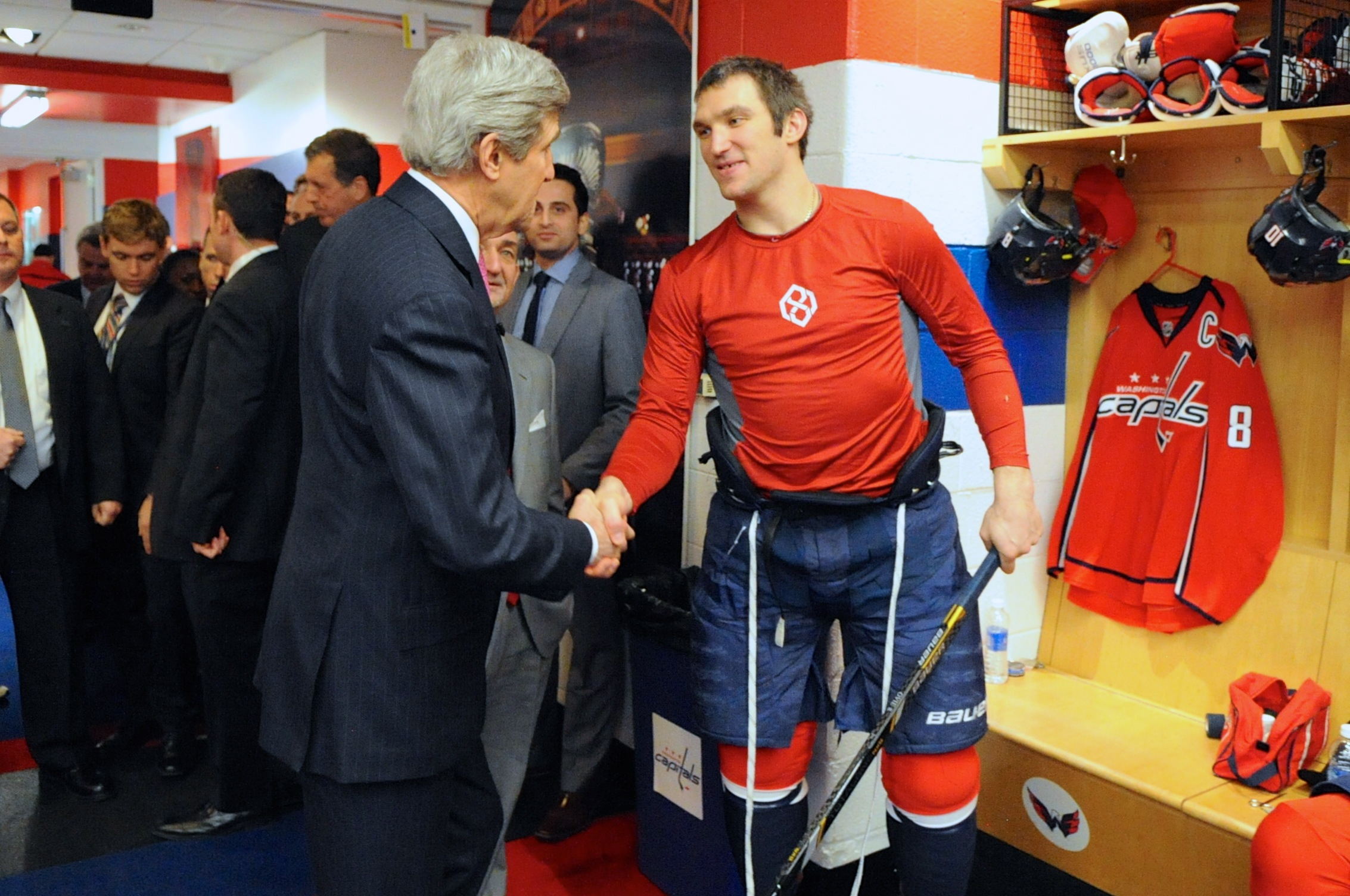
Ovechkin meeting U.S. Secretary of State John Kerry in the Capitals locker room on 6 February 2014

On 4 November 2014, in a game against the Calgary Flames, Ovechkin recorded his 826th point, a franchise record, surpassing Peter Bondra, who previously held the record with 825 points. On 31 March 2015, in a game against the Carolina Hurricanes, Ovechkin scored his 50th goal of the year on Hurricanes goaltender Cam Ward and became the sixth player in NHL history to have six 50-goal seasons, joining Guy Lafleur, Mike Bossy, Wayne Gretzky, Marcel Dionne and Mario Lemieux. On 2 April, Ovechkin scored his 51st and 52nd goals of the season in a 5–4 shootout win against Carey Price of the Montreal Canadiens, surpassing Bondra as the franchise leader in goals scored. It was also his 15th multi-goal game of the season, none of which was a hat trick. Ovechkin finished the 2014–15 season with 81 games played and 53 goals, 28 assists and 81 points. His 53 goals once again led the league in goal scoring, capturing his fifth Rocket Richard Trophy as a result. Ovechkin was named a finalist for the Hart Memorial Trophy for the fifth time in his career and the Ted Lindsay Award for the sixth time, both awards were ultimately awarded to Montreal Canadiens goaltender Carey Price. In the 2015 playoffs, Ovechkin recorded five goals and four assists for nine points in all 14 playoff games as the fourth-seeded Capitals defeated the fifth-seeded New York Islanders in seven games in the first round before getting defeated in the second round in seven games by the Presidents' Trophy-winning New York Rangers (despite the Capitals initially having a 3–1 series lead before the eventual 4–3 series defeat).

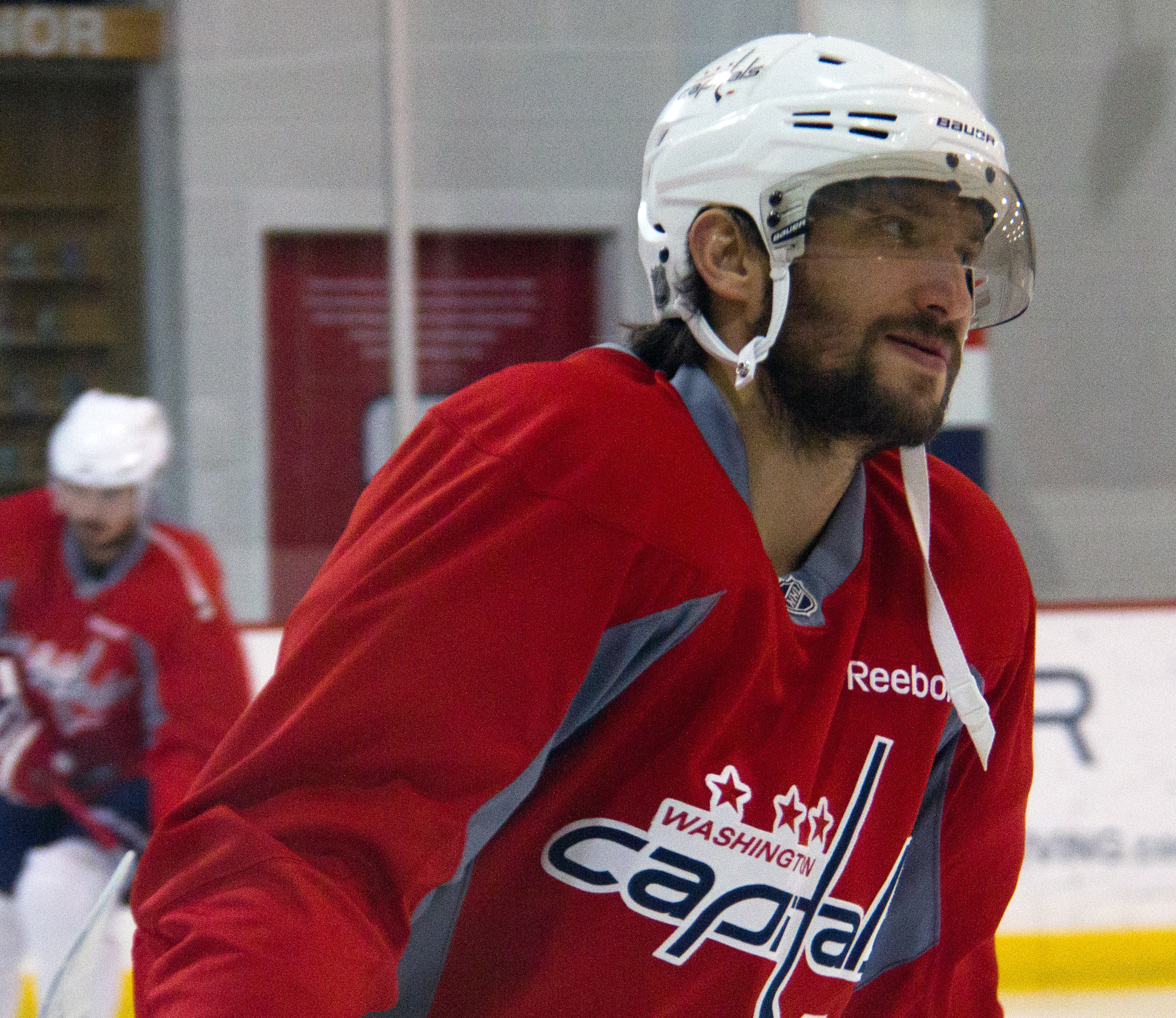
Ovechkin at a Capitals practice in October 2015. During the 2015–16 season, he became the first Russian player to reach the 500-goal plateau in the NHL.

On 7 November 2015, shortly into the 2015–16 season, in the second period of a game against the Toronto Maple Leafs, Ovechkin scored his eighth goal of the season to tie Sergei Fedorov's tally for the most goals among Russian born players, with 483. On 19 November, Ovechkin scored his ninth goal of the season against goaltender Kari Lehtonen in a 3–2 loss to the Dallas Stars; that goal broke Fedorov's record. On 10 January 2016, Ovechkin scored his 500th and 501st goals in a 7–1 victory over the Ottawa Senators against goaltender Andrew Hammond, becoming the 43rd player to reach the 500-goal plateau, and the fifth-fastest player to do so in his 801st game, as well as the first Russian. On 9 April, in the 2015–16 season finale against the St. Louis Blues, Ovechkin scored his 50th goal of the season and became the third player in NHL history to have seven or more 50-goal seasons. During the 2015–16 season, Ovechkin, for the first time in his career, did not lead the Washington Capitals in points, although he still led the team in goals and the entire league with 50 for his sixth Rocket Richard Trophy, and finished second on the team in points with 71, behind fellow countryman Evgeny Kuznetsov, who finished with 77. The Capitals would win the Presidents' Trophy as the regular season champions. Ovechkin was named a finalist for the Mark Messier Leadership Award for his contributions both on and off the ice during the regular season, which was eventually awarded to Nashville Predators defenseman and captain Shea Weber. After defeating the Philadelphia Flyers in six games in the first round of the 2016 playoffs, the Capitals lost their second-round series to the Pittsburgh Penguins in game six after a 4–3 overtime defeat.

On 11 January 2017, Ovechkin scored his 1,000th career point with a goal on Marc-André Fleury in a 7–1 win over the Pittsburgh Penguins, becoming the 37th player in NHL history to reach 1,000 points with only one team. Ovechkin finished the 2016–17 season playing all 82 games with 33 goals, 36 assists and 69 points to help the Capitals clinch their second consecutive presidents' Trophy and third in franchise history. In the 2017 playoffs, the Capitals defeated the eighth-seeded Toronto Maple Leafs in the first round. Still, they were defeated in the second round for the second consecutive year by the eventual Stanley Cup champion Pittsburgh Penguins, this time in seven games. In the fallout of their playoff loss, Ovechkin was considered among the greatest players to have never won the Stanley Cup. Upon returning to training camp the following season, Ovechkin arrived in Washington two weeks early and predicted: "We're not going to be suck this year [sic]."

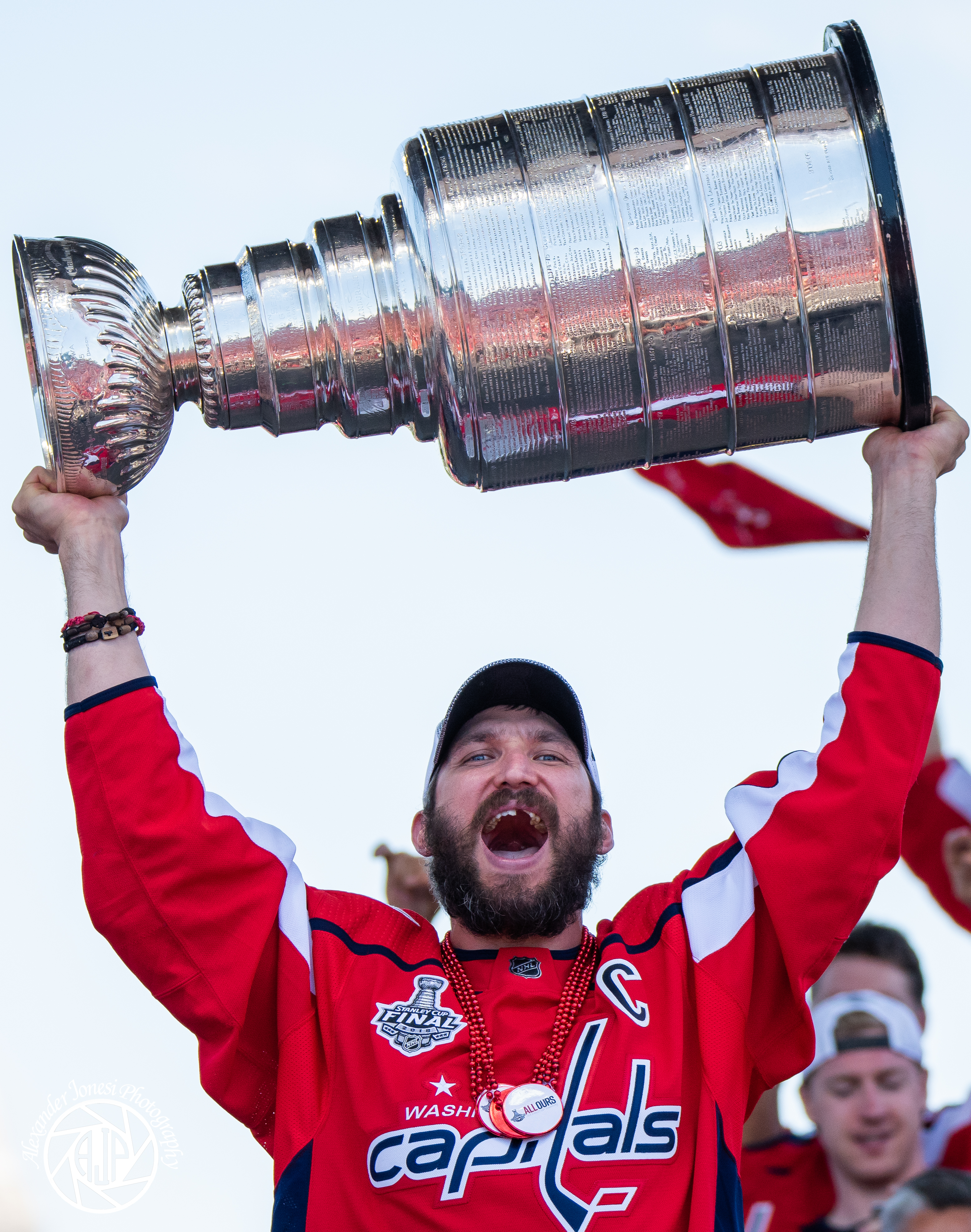
Ovechkin with the Stanley Cup in June 2018

Ovechkin broke many NHL and Capitals' records during the 2017–18 season. On 7 October 2017, he became the first player in 100 years with back-to-back hat tricks to start the season against the Ottawa Senators and Montreal Canadiens, respectively. On 21 October, in a game against the Detroit Red Wings, Ovechkin surpassed Jaromír Jágr for most regular season overtime goals with the 20th of his career. On 25 November, Ovechkin passed Peter Bondra as the team's all-time leader in hat tricks with the 20th of his career. On 25 January 2018, Ovechkin recorded his 500th career assist on a Nicklas Bäckström goal in a 4–2 win over the Florida Panthers. On 12 March, Ovechkin scored his 600th career goal against Connor Hellebuyck of the Winnipeg Jets, making him the 20th player to do so, and the fourth to do so in fewer than 1,000 games. On 1 April, Ovechkin would play against the Pittsburgh Penguins in his 1,000th NHL game, becoming the first Capitals player to play 1,000 games and the 54th NHL player to do so with the same franchise. At the conclusion of the season, Ovechkin was awarded the Rocket Richard trophy for the seventh time in his career with his league leading 49 goals. He became the second player, tied with Bobby Hull, to win the NHL's goal scoring title seven times. Besides his 49 goals, Ovechkin also recorded 38 assists for 87 points in all 82 contests played as the Capitals finished as the second seed in the Eastern Conference and fifth in the NHL overall. During the 2018 playoffs, Ovechkin scored 15 goals, 12 assists and 27 points in all 24 games averaging 20:44 of ice time per game. After defeating the seventh-seeded Columbus Blue Jackets in six games in the first round, the Capitals would once again meet their longtime rivals, the Pittsburgh Penguins, in the second round for the third straight season; headed by Penguins center and captain Sidney Crosby, Ovechkin's main rival for the greatest player of their generation. Ovechkin assisted on Evgeny Kuznetsov's game six overtime goal for 4–2 defeat in the series against the two-time defending Stanley Cup champion and fourth-seeded Penguins to clinch his first Eastern Conference Final appearance in 13 seasons. After defeating the Penguins in round two, Ovechkin would face another main rival of his generation in Tampa Bay Lightning center and captain Steven Stamkos in the Eastern Conference Final. Ovechkin and the Capitals recovered from a 3–2 series deficit to defeat the top-seeded Lightning in seven games and reach the Stanley Cup Final, the second time in franchise history (they previously did in 1998 before Ovechkin came to the team), and defeated the second-seeded Vegas Golden Knights in five games to win the Stanley Cup for the first time in franchise history and first in Ovechkin's career. Ovechkin won the Conn Smythe Trophy, awarded to the most valuable player for his team in the playoffs by NHL commissioner Gary Bettman.

On 6 December 2018, Ovechkin became the fastest player in NHL history and ninth overall to take 5,000 shots on goal, reaching that mark in 1,031 career games. Marcel Dionne, the previous holder of the record, required 184 more games than Ovechkin. He scored the 21st hat trick of his NHL career in a 6–2 win over Detroit Red Wings on 11 December, passing Pavel Bure for most by a Russian-born player in league history. On 14 December in a 6–5 shootout win over the Carolina Hurricanes, Ovechkin recorded his 23rd career hat trick with one of those goals being the 237th power play goal of his career on Hurricanes goaltender Scott Darling to pass Mario Lemieux for most power play goals with one franchise. Ovechkin had a career-best 14 game point streak from 16 November to 15 December, which included back-to-back hat tricks against the Red Wings on 10 December and Hurricanes on 15 December, respectively. (Note: The first player to score two back-to-back hat tricks in his NHL career since Alexei Kovalev in 2001.) On 2 January 2019, Ovechkin was named a captain for the upcoming 2019 National Hockey League All-Star Game, but announced that he was choosing to skip the game to rest, forcing him to serve an automatic one-game suspension as a result. On 5 February, Ovechkin recorded an assist on a T.J. Oshie goal for his 1,180th career point in a 3–2 win over the Vancouver Canucks, surpassing Sergei Fedorov for the most points recorded by a Russian-born player, doing so in 193 fewer games than Fedorov. Ovechkin ended the 2018–19 season with 51 goals, 38 assists and 89 points in 81 games played while the Capitals as a team finished as the Metropolitan division champions for the fourth consecutive season and the second seed in the Eastern Conference overall for the second consecutive season and fourth in the NHL overall. His 51 goals earned him the Rocket Richard Trophy for the eighth time in his NHL career. Ovechkin would also record four goals and five assists for nine points in all seven playoff games as the defending Stanley Cup champion Capitals were upset in seven games in the first round of the 2019 playoffs by the seventh-seeded Carolina Hurricanes, despite having a 3–2 series lead at one point.

==== Chasing goals record (2019–2025) ====
On 30 November 2019, in a 5–2 win over the Detroit Red Wings at Little Caesars Arena, Ovechkin recorded his 24th career hat trick which passed Jari Kurri for 10th most hat tricks in NHL history. In that same game, he also recorded an assist on a goal by Tom Wilson for a four-point night. On 24 January 2020, Ovechkin was named to the NHL all decade team for the 2010s. He ended the 2010s decade as the leading goal scorer (437 goals between 1 January 2010 to 31 December 2019) and the third most points (with 780), only trailing Sidney Crosby (788) and Patrick Kane (802), respectively. Ovechkin would be named captain for the 2020 National Hockey League All-Star Game, and again chose to skip the game on 26 January, to rest, and would serve another automatic one-game suspension. On 22 February, Ovechkin scored his 700th career goal in the third period of a 3–2 loss against the New Jersey Devils at Prudential Center, making him the eighth player in NHL history to accomplish the feat. The 2019–20 season ended three weeks early due to restriction surrounding the COVID-19 pandemic, so Ovechkin and Boston Bruins forward David Pastrňák were named co-winners of the Rocket Richard Trophy, with each having 48 goals at the time.

The 2020–21 season would mark the first time in Ovechkin's NHL career where he would not score at least 30 goals and having finished with 24 goals mainly due to the season being shortened due to the ongoing COVID-19 pandemic.

Ovechkin signed a five-year, $47.5 million contract extension with the Capitals on 27 July 2021. Ovechkin was a pending free agent at the time of the 2021 NHL expansion draft, allowing the Capitals to leave him unprotected for the Seattle Kraken to select and to protect other players; the Kraken ultimately selected goaltender Vítek Vaněček as their pick from Washington. He scored his 28th career hat trick, tying Marcel Dionne and Bobby Hull for sixth most in NHL history, on 26 November against the Florida Panthers. On 31 December, Ovechkin scored his 275th power play goal against the Detroit Red Wings, breaking Dave Andreychuk's all-time record. On 15 March 2022, Ovechkin scored his 767th career NHL goal in a 4–3 win over the New York Islanders, moving him into third place for goals scored all-time in the NHL, passing Jaromír Jágr; he achieved the feat in 477 fewer games than Jágr, yet had also taken 400 more shots on goal. On 20 April, in a 4–3 overtime loss against the Vegas Golden Knights, he scored his 50th goal of the season for the ninth time in his career, tying Mike Bossy and Wayne Gretzky for having the most 50-goal seasons in NHL history. At 36 years and 215 days of age, he is the oldest player to score 50 goals in a season; the previous oldest was Johnny Bucyk, doing so at the age of 35 years and 308 days. He ended the 2021–22 season with 50 goals, 40 assists and 90 points in 77 games played as the Capitals finished the season as the eighth and final seed in the Eastern Conference. His 50 goals ranked him fourth in the league, only behind the 52 goals by New York Rangers winger Chris Kreider, 55 goals by Edmonton Oilers center Leon Draisaitl and the league-leading 60 goals by Toronto Maple Leafs center Auston Matthews, respectively. Ovechkin would also record a goal and five assists for six points in all six playoff games in the Capitals first round loss in the 2022 playoffs by the Presidents' Trophy-winning Florida Panthers.

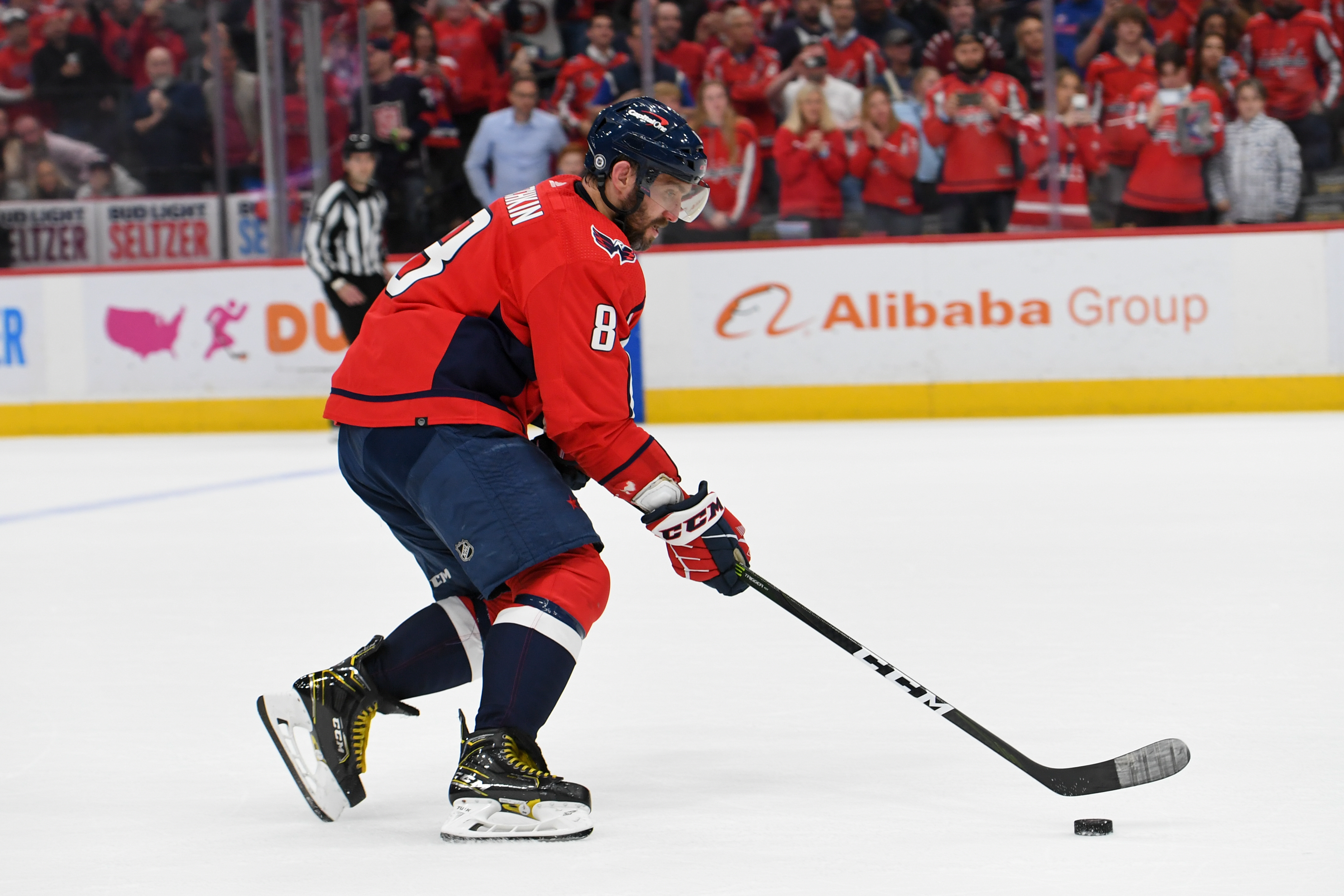
Ovechkin in March 2022

On 5 November 2022, Ovechkin scored his 787th goal with the Washington Capitals against the Arizona Coyotes, setting a new NHL record for most goals with one team, a record previously held by Gordie Howe. He set another NHL best on 29 November, surpassing Gretzky for most road goals with 403, after scoring two goals against the Vancouver Canucks. Ovechkin became the third player in NHL history to score 800 regular season goals, behind Howe and Gretzky, by scoring a hat trick against the Chicago Blackhawks at United Center on 13 December. It was also his 29th hat trick in the NHL, giving him the sixth most hat tricks by any player in the league's history. On 23 December, Ovechkin scored his 801st and 802nd career goals in a 4–1 win against the Winnipeg Jets, passing Gordie Howe for the second most goals in NHL history, behind only Wayne Gretzky. Ovechkin tied Mike Gartner for having the most 30-goal seasons upon recording a 30-goal season for the 17th time on 14 January 2023, in a 3–1 loss to the Philadelphia Flyers. He surpassed Gretzky to set a new NHL record for most 40-goal seasons after securing his 13th on 21 March, in a 7–6 overtime loss to the Columbus Blue Jackets. The Capitals would miss the 2023 playoffs by 12 points in the standings mainly due to injuries to other players on the team, marking the first time since 2014 where the Capitals missed the playoffs. Despite the team difficulties, Ovechkin still continued his individual success by having ended the 2022–23 season with 42 goals, 33 assists and 75 points in 73 games played.

On 7 December 2023, Ovechkin recorded his 1,500th point with an assist on a goal scored by Dylan Strome in a 5–4 shootout loss to the Dallas Stars to become the 16th player in NHL history to reach the mark. Ovechkin later scored his 57th career empty-net goal in a 3–0 Capitals win over the Boston Bruins on 10 February 2024, passing Wayne Gretzky for the most all-time. On 9 April, Ovechkin scored his 30th goal of the season on Detroit Red Wings goaltender Alex Lyon for his 18th 30-goal campaign, passing Mike Gartner for most 30-goal seasons in NHL history. He finished the 2023–24 season with 31 goals, 34 assists and 65 points in 79 games played. Ovechkin and the Capitals narrowly got back into the playoffs as the eighth and final seed in the Eastern Conference, however, Ovechkin did not record a single goal or assist as the Capitals were swept in four games by the Presidents' Trophy-winning New York Rangers in the first round of the 2024 playoffs.

On 15 October 2024, Ovechkin recorded his 700th career assist on a goal by Aliaksei Protas in a 4–2 win over the Vegas Golden Knights, becoming the 60th player in NHL history to reach the mark. On 2 November, he became the fourth player in NHL history 39 years of age or older to record three points in consecutive games (a goal and two assists in a 6–3 win against the Montreal Canadiens on 31 October and a goal and two assists in a 7–2 victory against the Columbus Blue Jackets on 2 November) after Tim Horton (1968–69), Gordie Howe (1968–69) and Jean Ratelle (1980–81). On 18 November, in a 6–2 win over the Utah Hockey Club, Ovechkin sustained a broken fibula as a result of a knee-on-knee collision with Utah forward Jack McBain, sidelining him for four-to-six weeks. At the time of this injury, Ovechkin had a league-leading 15 goals (including two goals earlier in the game against Utah prior to the injury) along with 10 assists for 25 points in the first 18 games of the 2024–25 season. After missing 16 games, Ovechkin returned to the Capitals lineup on 28 December in a 5–2 win over the Toronto Maple Leafs, where he would record an empty-net goal.

On 11 January 2025, Ovechkin scored an empty-net goal in a 4–1 win over the Nashville Predators, making him the second player in NHL history to record 20 consecutive 20-goal seasons, after Gordie Howe. On 16 January, Ovechkin recorded the lone goal of the game in a 1–0 overtime win against the Ottawa Senators. This goal on Senators goaltender Leevi Meriläinen resulted in Ovechkin surpassing Jaromír Jágr for most goalies scored on in NHL history with 179 different goaltenders since the start of his NHL career in 2005. On 23 February, Ovechkin recorded his 32nd career hat trick in a 7–3 victory against the Edmonton Oilers, making him the first player in NHL history to score 200 or more goals in three different decades (245 goals in the 2000s, a league high 437 goals in the 2010s and 200 in the 2020s). Over a month later, on 4 April, Ovechkin scored his 893rd and 894th goals in a 5–3 victory over the Chicago Blackhawks, tying Wayne Gretzky for the all-time goals record. His 893rd goal also marked his 40th of the season, extending his own record for 40-goal seasons to 14 and becoming only the second player in NHL history, after Gordie Howe, to record a 40-goal season at age 39 or older. During the Capitals' next game two days later, on 6 April, against the New York Islanders, Ovechkin scored the Capitals' only goal in the second period of a 4–1 loss on a power play against goaltender Ilya Sorokin to become the all-time NHL leading goal scorer. Ovechkin's record-breaking 895th goal came in his 1,487th career game, the same number of games as Gretzky's career total.

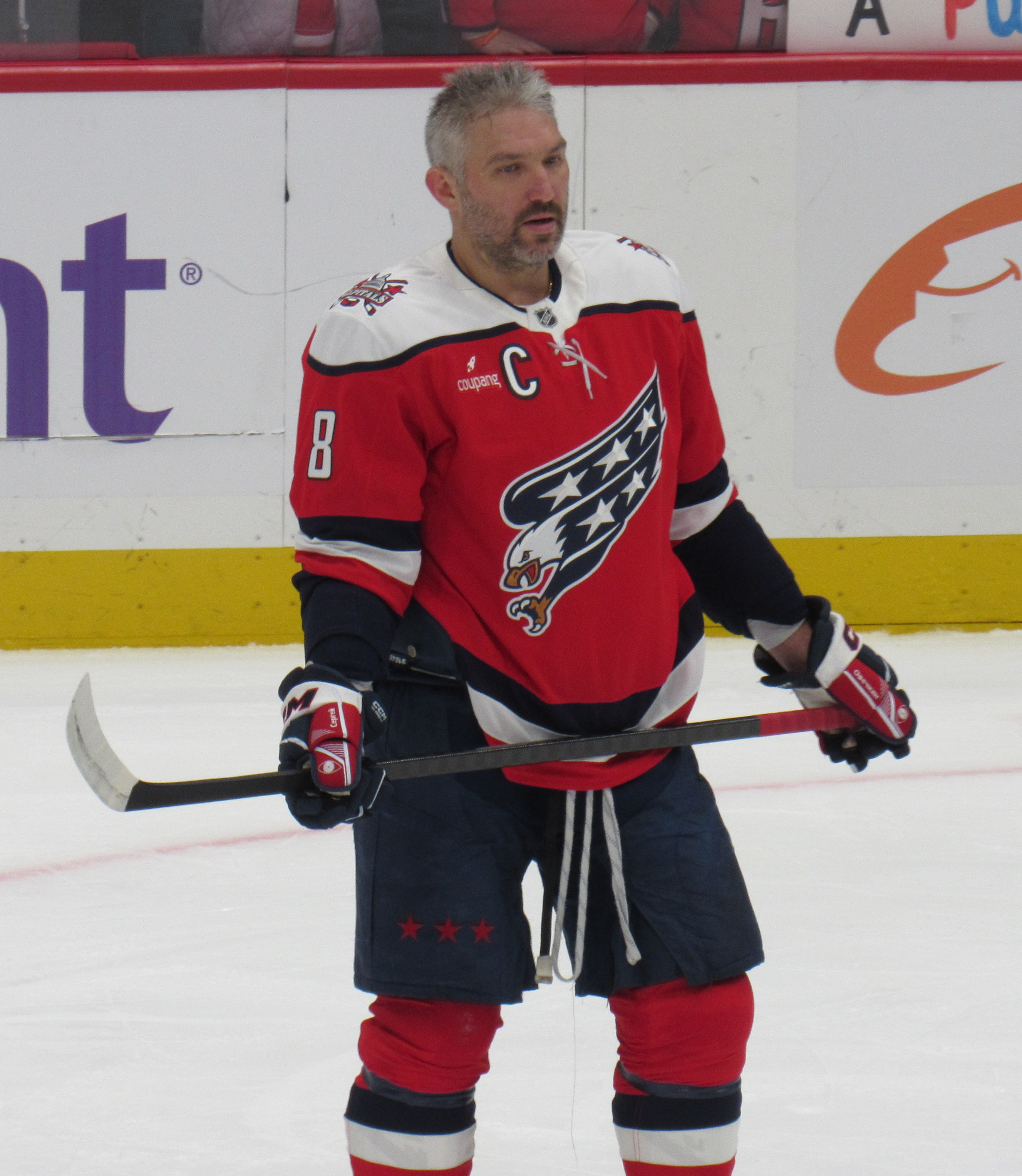
Ovechkin in February 2026

Ovechkin ended the season with 44 goals and 29 assists for 73 points in 65 games as the Capitals as a team finished as the top seed in the Eastern Conference and the Presidents' Trophy runner-up. His 44 goals ranked third in the league only behind the 45 goals by Toronto Maple Leafs' winger William Nylander and the league-leading 52 goals by Edmonton Oilers' center Leon Draisaitl, respectively. Ovechkin was also named the Capitals' nominee for the Bill Masterton Memorial Trophy as the player who shows the best qualities of perseverance, sportsmanship and dedication to the game of hockey but was not named a top three finalist by the NHL. On 21 April, in the first game of the first round of the 2025 playoffs against the Montreal Canadiens, Ovechkin recorded two goals (including the game-winner) on goaltender Sam Montembeault and an assist on a goal by Anthony Beauvillier. The game-winning goal was Ovechkin's first career playoff overtime goal to give the Capitals a 3–2 overtime victory to give the Capitals a 1–0 lead in the series. Ovechkin and the Capitals would eventually defeat the eighth-seeded Canadiens in five games, marking the first time the Capitals won a playoff series of any kind since the 2018 Stanley Cup Final. The Capitals, however, were upset in the second round in five games by the Carolina Hurricanes. Ovechkin ended the playoffs with five goals and an assist for six points in all 10 games. For his efforts in the season and his continued impact off the ice, Ovechkin was named the winner of the Mark Messier Leadership Award by Mark Messier himself as the most superior leader within their sport by setting a positive example through on-ice performance and as a contributing member of his community.

==== NHL's all-time leading goal scorer (2025–present) ====
Prior to and during the 2025–26 season, Ovechkin had stated multiple times that he was not decided on whether or not he would retire following the final year of his contract, which was set to expire following the conclusion of the season.

On 5 November 2025, in a 6–1 victory over the St. Louis Blues at Capital One Arena, Ovechkin scored his 900th career goal on goaltender Jordan Binnington, making him the first player in NHL history to reach that milestone. In a 2–1 victory over the Los Angeles Kings, Ovechkin scored his 442nd goal in Capital One Arena on 17 November, surpassing Gordie Howe for the most regular season goals scored in one building.

On 22 March 2026, Ovechkin scored a goal in a 3–2 overtime loss against the Colorado Avalanche, becoming only the second player, after Gretzky, to score 1,000 career goals combined between the regular season and Stanley Cup playoffs. On 26 March, Ovechkin scored the 34th hat trick of his career against the Utah Mammoth, breaking Brett Hull's NHL record for the most hat tricks against different teams, with 21. His performance also surpassed Hull for the 4th most hat tricks in NHL history. Ovechkin scored his 30th goal of the season against the Philadelphia Flyers on 31 March, extending his own record for the most 30-goal seasons to 20. In doing so, he became the fourth player in NHL history to score 30 goals at age 40 or older, with the only others being Gordie Howe in 1968–69 and 1969–70, Johnny Bucyk in 1975–76 and Teemu Selänne in 2010–11. On 10 April, Ovechkin was named as the Capitals' nominee for the King Clancy Memorial Trophy, awarded to the player who best exemplifies leadership qualities and makes notable contributions to the community, but was not named a top three finalist by the league. On 12 April, Ovechkin and the Capitals played their final home game of the regular season against the Pittsburgh Penguins. It was widely believed by fans that this would be Ovechkin's final game in Washington before retirement. Prior to puck-drop, Capitals center Dylan Strome intentionally violated faceoff rules in order for Ovechkin to take the draw against Penguins captain Sidney Crosby. The Capitals would end up winning the game 3–0, with Ovechkin getting an assist. After the game, the Pittsburgh Penguins remained on the ice to take part in a ceremonial handshake line led by Crosby, but Ovechkin waved them off the ice before it could begin, much to the delight of the crowd in Washington. Following chants of "One more year," from the Washington crowd, Ovechkin responded in a post-game interview that he "will think about it."

On 1 July 2026, Ovechkin became a free agent for the first time in his career. However, the next day, it was announced that the Capitals re-signed him to a one-year, $4.25 million contract that also featured a $4.75 million bonus if he appeared in at least 10 games during the season. On 5 October, Ovechkin announced that the 2026–27 season would be his last in the NHL.

== Player profile ==
"When (other) guys shoot it, it goes in somewhat of a straight line. His is dipping, diving, rising, sinking. It just comes at you. It's not like any other shot.

— Dallas Stars goaltender Ben Bishop on Ovechkin, February 2019.

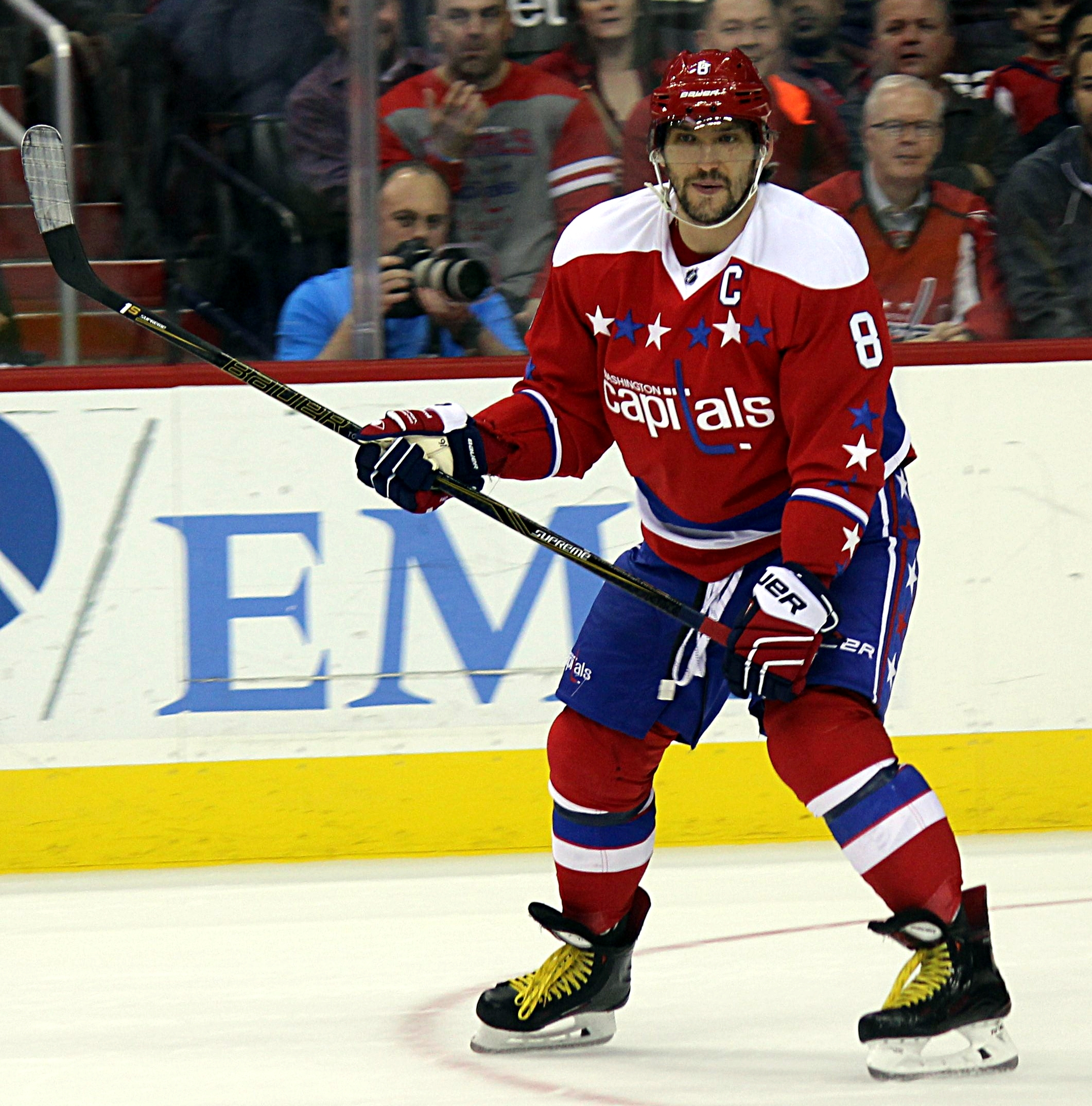
Ovechkin waits for the pass for a one-timer from the inside of the faceoff circle during a game in March 2016

Ovechkin is widely considered a generational talent and the greatest goal scorer in NHL history. He overtook Wayne Gretzky in total career goals (894) in April 2025. Gretzky himself had stated he was cheering for Ovechkin to break his record, and when asked about it in April 2019, Gretzky stated he wanted to be the first one to shake Ovechkin's hand if he were to do so; Gretzky went down to ice level to congratulate Ovechkin when he set the new record on 6 April 2025.

He is known for his deadly one-timer, which he usually fires from the left faceoff circle, an area known as his "office". In August 2006, New York Rangers forward Jaromír Jágr expressed admiration for Ovechkin's goal scoring productivity by quoting "All his goals, they are not flukes. Most of the time, he beats guys one-on-one, then you get your highlight". In October 2014, teammate Brooks Orpik said of his one-timer: "You know it's going there, and you still can't stop him." Ovechkin proves "the exception rather than the rule when it comes to success" on one-timers, which "can be very difficult to pull off," involving "taking a hard pass and timing a shot perfectly, when the puck may be rolling or on end, while also aiming at a small net, particularly from far distances." In October 2014, Tampa Bay Lightning captain Steven Stamkos said of Ovechkin's playing style, "He's a guy that not only uses his skill set, but his physicality, that's what sets him apart. He's willing to go to those areas and has one of the best shots in the league." In July 2015, Los Angeles Kings goaltender Jonathan Quick quoted Ovechkin's powerful shooting skills by saying "Guys like Ovi shoot it so hard that it's almost like you're a batter in baseball. You see the blur of the puck coming at you in frames."

Ovechkin's ability to shoot and hit heavily as a power forward has been well documented. After clinching the hardest shot title at the 2018 National Hockey League All-Star Game skills competition with a 98.8 mph first attempt, he became the only player in the 2018 All Star game to break the century mark, surpassing 100 mph on his second shot, stepping "up to plate and delivered a blistering 101.3 MPH blast." In April 2025, Capitals teammate Tom Wilson exclaimed on Ovechkin's capabilities by saying: “He's a machine. He's out there creating energy for our team, scoring. ... That's what a leader does. It's one thing to be good all season long, but the guys that show up and hit and block shots and lead the team, that's why he's a legend.”

Ovechkin has been awarded the Hart Memorial Trophy honoring the most valuable player in the league three times (2008, 2009, 2013) and was also a finalist for the award two other times (in 2010 and 2015). Ovechkin's most enduring nickname is "The Great 8". (Note: His nickname "Great 8" refers to the Capitals uniform number he wears.)

While Ovechkin has been well known for being a prolific goal-scorer with his powerful shooting skills, he has also been shown to be a proficient passer and setting up goals scored by teammates. On 25 January 2018, when Ovechkin recorded his 500th assist on a Nicklas Bäckström goal in a 4–2 win over the Florida Panthers, then–Capitals head coach Barry Trotz said after the game, "He's a legendary player. He's getting the points, the goals, the assists. Everybody thinks of Alex as a pure goal-scorer, which he is, and he's got to those numbers hundreds of games before other people have reached that number but you always tend to forget he's a pretty good playmaker as well." On 22 October 2018, in a game against the Vancouver Canucks, after Vancouver had pulled their goalie, Ovechkin passed the puck to teammate T. J. Oshie rather than score the easy hat trick for himself since he had scored twice earlier in the game. "[Oshie asked] 'Why did you pass me the puck?'" Ovechkin said. "But he was so wide open and I try to give him pass. Save mine for next time." On 9 February 2025, after a 5–4 shootout loss to the Utah Hockey Club, a game where Ovechkin was held goalless but recorded three assists, Capitals head coach Spencer Carbery described Ovechkin's passing abilities by remarking "Everybody is so focused on his shot when he gets the puck, you're always thinking shot, shot, shot. But he's got that look-off pass too, the shot-pass, I call it".

Ovechkin has also been recognized for showing opposing players respect for either returning to their team after overcoming hard obstacles off the ice or by their performance on the ice. In a game against the Montreal Canadiens on 19 November 2018, early in to the 2018–19 season, Canadiens goaltender Carey Price made a sprawling stop on Ovechkin's signature left circle slapshot in the dying seconds of the third period with both teams tied 4–4 and Ovechkin having scored twice earlier in the game. Ovechkin skated over to Price and applauded him for his effort in denying him a hat trick and the game-winner in regulation. The Capitals would go on to defeat the Canadiens in OT 5–4 with former Canadien Lars Eller scoring the winning goal for the Capitals. Also, in a game against the Canadiens on 16 April 2022, towards the end of the 2021–22 season, Ovechkin showed respect and admiration for Price by giving him a fist bump from across their respective benches during a stoppage of play. The Canadiens game the previous day against the New York Islanders was Price's first game back from a knee injury he sustained the previous summer in the 2021 Stanley Cup Final loss against the Tampa Bay Lightning. He had multiple setbacks in his recovery and a brief stint in the NHL Players' Assistance Program to get help with his mental health after coming forward about his struggles from alcohol abuse. When asked about this welcome back gesture in a post-game interview, Ovechkin responded "Obviously, he's one of the best players in the league. He's a warrior and good for him, his organization, his family and the game of hockey."

The Capitals' morning skate ritually begins with Ovechkin "sprinting around the rink, a solo lap to the sound of sticks tapping from his teammates." After he completes the lap, the rest of the team comes onto the ice to join him. Ovechkin is known as a durable player, losing little time to injuries, illnesses, or suspensions. After being struck on the foot by a teammate's wrist shot during an 26 October 2006 practice in Vancouver, he "crumpled to the ice and had to be helped to the locker room." Exhibiting no ill effects in practice the next day, Ovechkin famously told reporters, "I'm okay; Russian machine never breaks."

Late in the 2008–09 season, Ovechkin garnered some criticism over his exuberant after-goal celebrations. On 28 February 2009, during a segment of Hockey Night in Canada's Coach's Corner, Canadian hockey analyst Don Cherry likened Ovechkin's celebrations of jumping into the boards and his teammates to that of soccer players, concluding that this was not the Canadian way and advising Canadian kids to ignore Ovechkin's example. Then-Capitals head coach Bruce Boudreau came to Ovechkin's defense, stating Cherry "doesn't know Alex like we know Alex", and Ovechkin himself stated that he "doesn't care" about Cherry. The next notable incident happened on 19 March 2009, in a game against the Tampa Bay Lightning. After scoring his 50th goal of the season, Ovechkin put his stick on the ice, pretending to warm his hands over it because it was "hot". The incident sparked an immediate response from then–Tampa Bay head coach Rick Tocchet, who said that "[Ovechkin] went down a notch in my books." Boudreau had also stated that he would discuss the incident with Ovechkin, and then-teammate Mike Green, despite being the first to celebrate with Ovechkin afterwards, commented that he did not wish to join in the pre-meditated celebration. Ovechkin himself was unapologetic, and said about Don Cherry in particular, "He's going to be pissed off for sure...I love it!".

After using and endorsing CCM equipment for most of his career, Ovechkin made the move to Bauer Hockey in August 2011 following a decline in his point production in the 2010–11 season. He continued to use Bauer equipment until the Stanley Cup-winning 2017–18 season, when he switched back to CCM. Beginning in the 2023–24 season, Ovechkin began using a custom-manufactured-and-branded stick, featuring his own "8" logo.

== International play ==
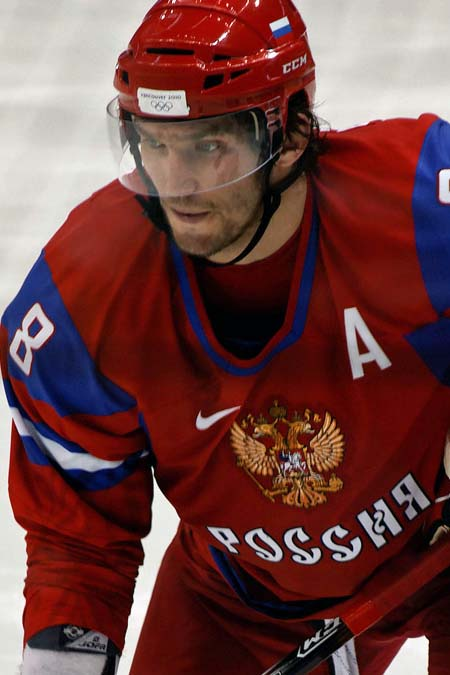
- Ovechkin at the 2010 Winter Olympics

Medal record

Men's ice hockey

Representing Russia

World Championships
Gold medal – first place	2008 Canada	
Gold medal – first place	2012 Finland/Sweden	
Gold medal – first place	2014 Belarus	
Silver medal – second place	2010 Germany	
Silver medal – second place	2015 Czech Republic	
Bronze medal – third place	2005 Austria	
Bronze medal – third place	2007 Russia	
Bronze medal – third place	2016 Russia	
Bronze medal – third place	2019 Slovakia	

World Junior Championships
Gold medal – first place	2003 Canada	
Silver medal – second place	2005 United States	

World U18 Championships
Silver medal – second place	2002 Slovakia	
Bronze medal – third place	2003 Russia	

At the age of 16, Ovechkin played at the 2002 World U-17 Hockey Challenge, where he scored two hat tricks, one against Switzerland and one against the United States, and an assist.

At the age of 17, when he was selected by Russian coach Viktor Tikhonov to play in the Česká Pojišťovna Cup EuroTour tournament, Ovechkin became the youngest skater ever to play for the Russian national team. In that tournament, he also became the youngest player ever to score for the national team. He also was selected to play at the 2002 World U18 Championships, in which he amassed 14 goals and four assists in eight games, leading the Russia under-18 team to a silver medal. Ovechkin now shares the single tournament goals record with Cole Caufield, who scored as many in seven games at the 2019 World U18 Championships.

At the age of 18, Ovechkin was named captain of the Russia junior team. Russia finished fifth in the tournament. In 2003, the team would go on to win a gold medal in the World Junior Championships.

At the age of 19, Ovechkin was named to the Russian senior team for the 2004 World Cup of Hockey, making him the youngest player to play in the tournament. That same year, Ovechkin was named captain of the junior team in the 2005 World Junior Championships. The tournament, lasting from 25 December 2004 to 4 January 2005, was Ovechkin's third and last. At the conclusion of the tournament, he had collected seven goals, tied for the tournament lead. His team received the silver medal after losing the gold medal game to Canada on 4 January, and Ovechkin was named the Best Forward of the tournament as well as selected to the tournament All-Star team. In 2005, Ovechkin played in his first World Championship. He scored five goals and three assists, landing eighth in the top scorers list and sharing third place in goal scoring.

In 2006, Ovechkin played in his first Winter Olympics. Although Russia came away from the games without a medal, Ovechkin scored five goals in the tournament, including the game-winner against Canada's Martin Brodeur, eliminating Canada from the tournament. Ovechkin was the only non-Swedish or Finnish player named to the all-tournament team, with the former two nations having won the gold and silver medals.

At the 2006 World Championship, Ovechkin scored six goals and three assists (nine points) in seven games before Russia lost 4–3 to the Czech Republic in the quarterfinals. For his efforts, Ovechkin was one of six players selected to the Media All-Star team.

At the 2008 World Championship, Ovechkin helped lead Russia to the gold medal by finishing with 12 points (six goals, six assists) in nine games. He was selected to the Media All-Star team for the second time in five tournament appearances.

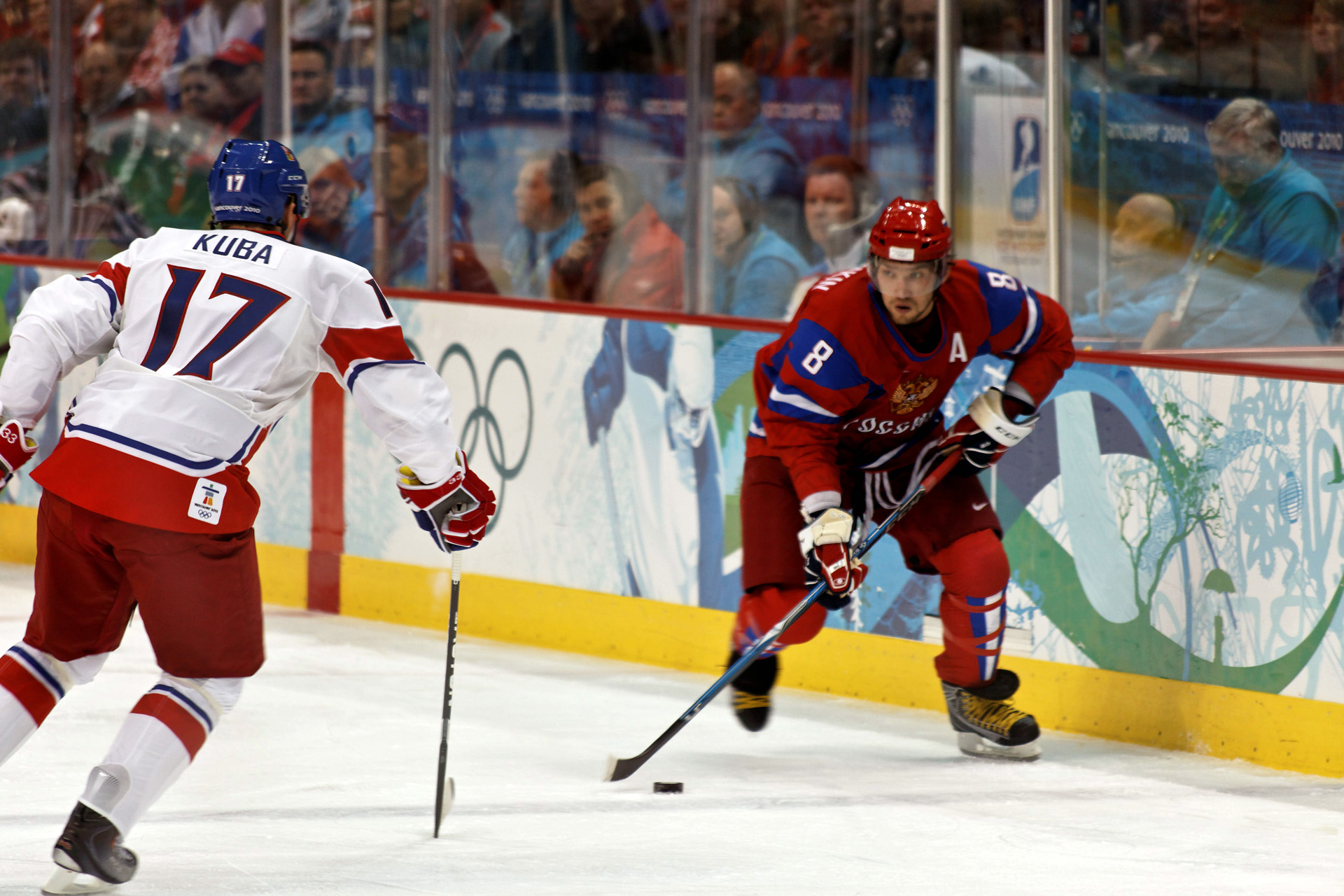
Ovechkin with the Russian national men's ice hockey team skates the puck forward during the 2010 Winter Olympics.

In the 2010 Winter Olympics, Ovechkin and the Russian team were one of the favorites to win the gold medal. Despite high expectations, Russia lost to Canada 7–3 in the quarterfinals. Ovechkin finished with two goals and two assists in Russia's four games.

After being eliminated in the first round of the 2010 Stanley Cup playoffs, Ovechkin joined Russia for the 2010 World Championship along with many other Russian stars, such as Evgeni Malkin, Pavel Datsyuk and Ilya Kovalchuk. Despite being heavily favored to win the tournament, Russia lost to the Czech Republic in the finals.

Ovechkin also joined the Russian team for the 2011 World Championship after the Capitals were eliminated from the Stanley Cup playoffs. He played in five games for the Russian team, but did not manage to score any points, the first time he failed to score any points in a World Championship tournament.

Ovechkin played in Russia's last three games of the 2012 World Championship. He recorded two goals and two assists as Russia won the tournament.

Ovechkin also represented Russia in 2013 World Championship. He joined the national team after the Capitals were eliminated from the 2013 Stanley Cup playoffs. Russia had already advanced to the first playoff round where they faced the United States. The Americans defeated Russia 8–3, eliminating them from the tournament.

In the 2014 Winter Olympics, Ovechkin represented Russia under enormous pressure as the tournament was hosted on home ice in Sochi. Russia lost to arch-rivals Finland 3–1 in the quarterfinal round.

Ovechkin participated in the 2014 World Championship where Russia won gold. After the tournament, he asked Vladimir Putin to reward the Russian team on an equal basis with the 2014 Olympic champions. That was criticized as the World Championship was considered insignificant compared to Olympic gold, which Russia had failed to win earlier that year in Sochi. He also joined the Russian team late in the 2015 World Championship, where Russia won the silver medal.

== Off the ice ==
Ovechkin was the cover athlete of 2K Sports hockey simulation video game NHL 2K10, as well as the cover athlete of EA Sports' NHL 07 and NHL 21. On 11 June 2008, Ovechkin launched his own line of designer streetwear with CCM. On 6 July 2009, Ovechkin was named an ambassador for the 2014 Winter Olympics in Sochi, Russia. In late 2009, he was named GQ's 48th most powerful person in Washington, D.C. In 2011, Ovechkin signed a long-term sponsorship deal with sportswear brand Nike.

On 4 January 2011, halfway into the 2010–11 season, Ovechkin was featured in one of ESPN's This is SportsCenter commercials, in which he laughed off a question by ESPN personality Steve Levy accusing him of being a Russian spy before being pulled upward by a line through an open ceiling tile by countryman and then-Capitals teammate Semyon Varlamov.

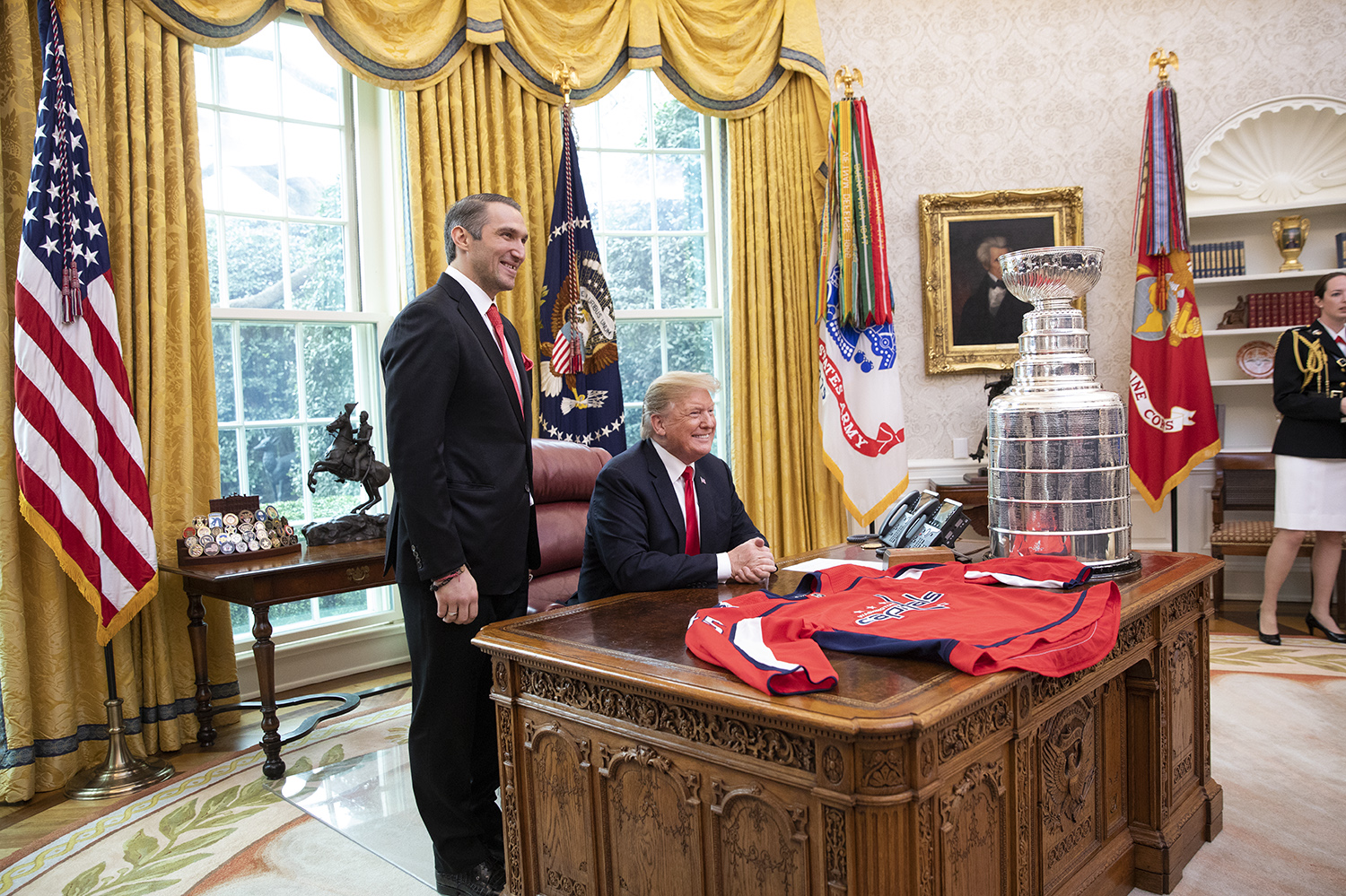
Ovechkin and United States President Donald Trump at a White House ceremony celebrating the Capitals' Stanley Cup championship in March 2019

Ovechkin is a dedicated car enthusiast, owning many fine automobiles, such as a Mercedes-Benz SL65 AMG Black Series and a custom Mercedes S63 AMG. In January 2015, at the 2015 NHL All-Star Game, Ovechkin lobbied Honda for a new car, and brought an element of silliness to the "draft" where he was chosen third to last; the last two players selected, Ryan Nugent-Hopkins and Filip Forsberg, each received a new car, but Ovechkin would not give up. When Honda representatives asked his agent why he wanted a car so badly, they were told that he planned to donate it to the American Special Hockey Association, and at the end of the event, he was handed the keys to a new Honda Accord. That Accord was auctioned off, and the proceeds used to benefit the charity Ovechkin highlighted and brought attention to with his antics.

Following the Capitals' 2018 Stanley Cup victory, Ovechkin participated in a number of memorable celebrations, including an incident on 9 June 2018, two days after the Capitals' victory, where he and teammates T. J. Oshie, Braden Holtby, Lars Eller and Tom Wilson swam in the fountains at the Georgetown waterfront with the Cup. The summer of 2018 was dubbed by the Washington media as "The Summer of Ovi."

Ovechkin is a keen soccer fan and an avid supporter of Liverpool F.C. In May 2021, he was reportedly also an investor in the Washington Spirit, a professional team in the National Women's Soccer League, but Sportico reported in June 2022 that he might not have formally completed the process to acquire the stake, and that even if he had, it was unclear whether he retained his stake after the club was sold in February 2022. In June 2022, he signed a one-game contract with FC Dynamo Moscow, the club his father played for, in a friendly against FC Amkal Moscow. He wore the number 3 jersey in honor of his father, who wore the number when he played for the club. Ovechkin scored a goal in the match.

Ovechkin has appeared in three films: Zaytsev, zhgi! Istoriya shoumena (2010) as an actor, and NHL: Just Like Me (2008) and Boys to the Bigs (2008) as himself. He also served as an inspiration for the character of Ilya Rozanov in Rachel Reid's Game Changers novel series, most notably in Heated Rivalry (2019) and its sequel The Long Game (2022). In 2025, the novels were adapted into the television series Heated Rivalry, in which Rozanov was portrayed by Connor Storrie.

On 23 August 2025, it was announced that he had become one of the official ambassadors of Intervision 2025.

=== Philanthropy ===
In 2006, Ovechkin created a program called Ovi's Crazy 8's, a program through which he purchases and donates eight Capitals season tickets to 'Most Valuable Kids' which allows fans who normally wouldn't have access to tickets the opportunity to attend Capitals home games. As of 2024, more than 5,700 individuals have had a chance to see a game free of charge through this program.

Since 2014, Ovechkin has been an ambassador for the American Special Hockey Association, a charity which supports individuals with intellectual, developmental and physical disabilities and the mission to give them a chance to learn and grow by playing ice hockey.

In March 2025, Ovechkin announced that he would be partnering up with Hockey Fights Cancer and the V Foundation to raise money and awareness for pediatric cancer for every goal he scores as he closed in on breaking the all time goal-scoring record.

=== Russian politics ===
In January 2017, Ovechkin said: "I have a good relationship with Russians and with Americans. So, I'm neutral." In November 2017, Ovechkin started a movement called PutinTeam in support of Russian President Vladimir Putin during the 2018 Russian presidential election. Asked whether it was political, Ovechkin described his actions as a show of support for Russia, "I just support my country, you know? That's where I'm from, my parents live there, all my friends. Like every human from different countries, they support their president. It's not about political stuff." Of his participation in PutinTeam, Ovechkin also said:

I'm not a politic. I don't know what's happening out there. I know it's a hard situation, but it is what it is. You know, I play here, and this is my second home. I don't want to fight between two countries, because it's going to be a mess.

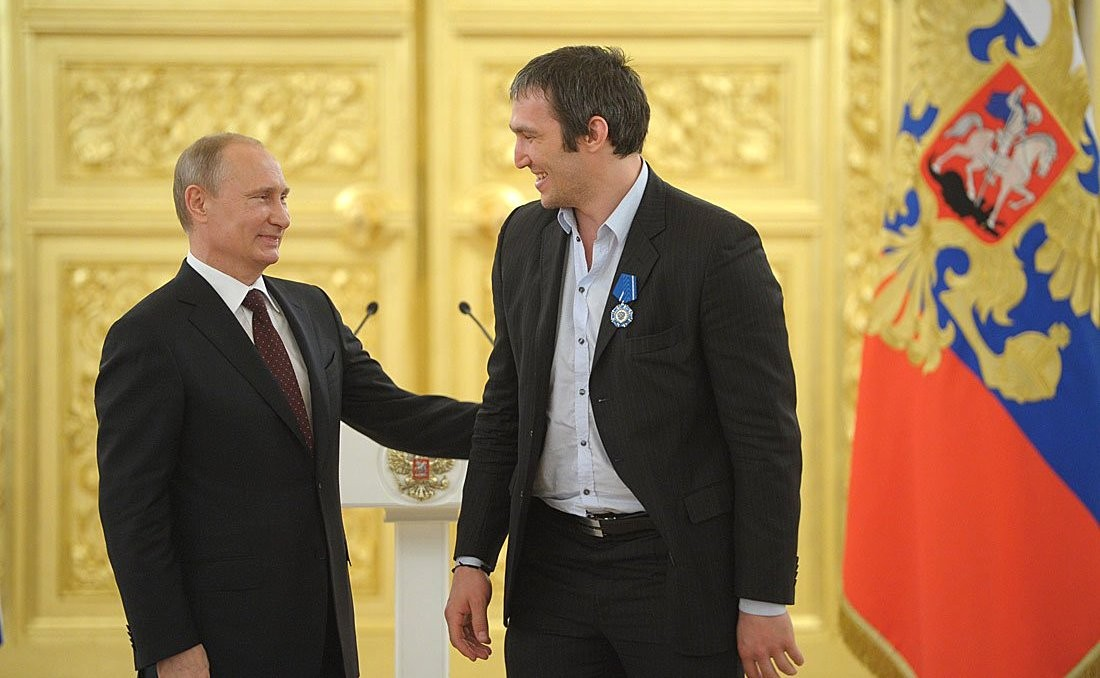
Ovechkin with Vladimir Putin during an award ceremony for the Russian national ice hockey team at the Grand Kremlin Palace in May 2014

PutinTeam was first announced in a 2 November 2017 post on Ovechkin's Instagram account, which has over one million followers. On 23 November, Ovechkin announced on his Instagram that the group's official website had been launched. On the soft launch of the site, visitors were encouraged to sign up for the team, track related news, participate in contests and attend and organize events. Ovechkin has claimed that the idea for PutinTeam was all his and that the group is non-political in its nature. Vedomosti, a Russian financial newspaper, reported that Kremlin sources have said that IMA-Consulting were behind the creation of the organization. A Kremlin-supported public-relations firm, IMA-Consulting reportedly held a $600,000 contract to promote the 2018 Russian presidential elections. The Kremlin spoke in support of the movement after its announcement. According to The Washington Post, Ovechkin has a personal relationship with Putin. Ovechkin has a personal phone number for Putin, who is a big hockey fan, and received a gift from Putin at his 2016 wedding. Ovechkin said that he and Putin do not have much in common: "We talk about hockey and all that stuff. That's it."

On 25 February 2022, following the Russian invasion of Ukraine, Ovechkin called for peace and no more war without mentioning Russia or Ukraine directly. He said "I have family back in Russia. It's scary moments. We can't do anything. We just hope it's going to end soon and everyone's going to be all right." In May 2022, Ovechkin responded to a question about Putin: "He is my president, right? I am Russian. What else can I say?" According to some experts and people close to Ovechkin, renouncing Putin and condemning the invasion of Ukraine could have negative consequences for Ovechkin and his family members living in Russia, given the repressive nature of Putin's regime. Ovechkin reportedly wanted to change his Instagram profile picture from Putin to a peace symbol after the invasion but was warned that doing so would potentially put his family in Russia in danger.

In September 2026, Ovechkin appeared in a political advertisement ahead of the 2026 Russian legislative election alongside notable figures Sergey Lavrov and Margarita Simonyan for United Russia, which received significant backlash. A spokesperson for the Washington Capitals stated that Ovechkin was "asked to participate in the video campaign while back in his home country this summer", as figures such as Dominik Hašek condemned Ovechkin's participation by stating that "Everyone in this photograph has chosen to officially support Russia's imperialist war in Ukraine... because of each of them, many Ukrainians and Russians will be killed". During an official Capitals press conference regarding the campaign on 17 September, Ovechkin stated that he did not tell the Capitals organization before participating in the video. Capitals general manager Chris Patrick told reporters that if the team had been aware Ovechkin planned to partake in the ad, "we would have worked to avoid the situation very hard. And I doubt we'd be standing where we're standing right now if he had run it by us." On 17 September, Ovechkin was banned from entering Latvia indefinitely.

=== Feud with Evgeni Malkin ===
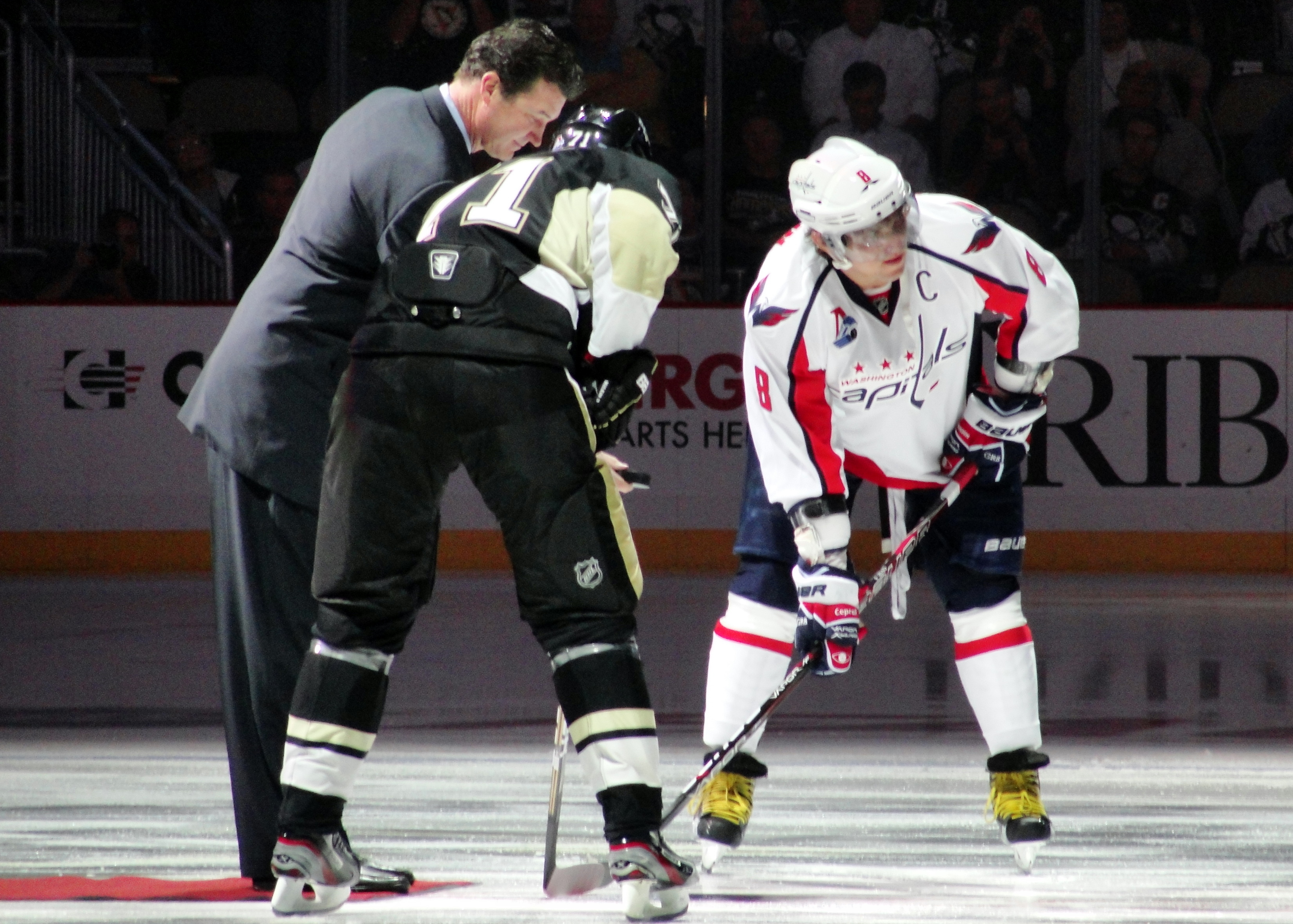
Evgeni Malkin and Ovechkin take a ceremonial face-off with Mario Lemieux dropping the puck for the face-off in October 2011, nearly three years after their feud had ended.

Ovechkin was involved in a feud with Pittsburgh Penguins forward Evgeni Malkin, who was drafted second behind Ovechkin in the 2004 NHL entry draft. Though the two were reported to be good friends when they roomed together during the 2006 Winter Olympics in Turin, Italy, this friendship quickly saw tension arise. The feud may have started in August 2007 when Ovechkin punched Malkin's Russian agent, Gennady Ushakov, at a Moscow nightclub. Ovechkin denied that version of events, while Malkin confirmed it. On 21 January 2008, in Pittsburgh, Ovechkin took a run at Malkin, which would have seemingly resulted in a devastating hit had Malkin not ducked out of the way just in time. The two would also not make eye contact at the 2008 NHL Awards Ceremony. Ovechkin has repeatedly denied "having it out" for Malkin. In 2009, in an interview with RT, Ovechkin would confirm that the event in which he punched Malkin's agent was true, while also stating "but is okay".

The feud raised many concerns as to its effect on the league, and the Russian national team at the 2010 Winter Olympics in Vancouver. On 24 January 2009, at the SuperSkills Competition, Malkin assisted Ovechkin in his stunt during the Breakaway Challenge. Malkin handed Ovechkin his props for the stunt as well as handing him his stick and pouring some sports drink down Ovechkin's throat. It has been reported that Ilya Kovalchuk, who was then the Atlanta Thrashers' captain and a teammate of Ovechkin and Malkin on the Russian national team, brokered the peace between the two.

Malkin gave a speech at Ovechkin's 35th birthday party in September 2020. The two are reportedly very close friends again, with the feud long in the past.

== Personal life ==
In 2006 at a preseason charity golf tournament in Springfield, Virginia, while playing golf for his first time, Ovechkin made a hole in one on a par 3 hole.

Ovechkin was formerly engaged to tennis player Maria Kirilenko. On 21 July 2014, Kirilenko announced that the wedding was called off and that the two were no longer seeing each other. On 11 September 2015, Ovechkin announced his engagement to Nastya Shubskaya, the daughter of Russian actress Vera Glagoleva, whom he subsequently married.

Ovechkin and his wife have two children. In August 2018, the couple had a son, and in May 2020, the couple had a second son.

By June 2021, Ovechkin was studying for and close to obtaining a Candidate of Sciences, the Russian equivalent of a PhD. Ovechkin's field of study is Pedagogical Sciences.

== Career statistics ==
=== Regular season and playoffs ===
(Sources:)

Bold indicates led league
Bold italics indicate NHL record

			Regular season					Playoffs
Season	Team	League	GP	G	A	Pts	PIM	GP	G	A	Pts	PIM
2001–02	Dynamo Moscow-2	RUS-3	19	18	8	26	20	—	—	—	—	—
2001–02	Dynamo Moscow	RSL	21	2	2	4	4	3	0	0	0	0
2002–03	Dynamo Moscow	RSL	40	8	7	15	29	5	0	0	0	2
2003–04	Dynamo Moscow	RSL	53	13	11	24	40	3	0	0	0	2
2004–05	Dynamo Moscow	RSL	37	13	13	26	32	10	2	4	6	31
2005–06	Washington Capitals	NHL	81	52	54	106	52	—	—	—	—	—
2006–07	Washington Capitals	NHL	82	46	46	92	52	—	—	—	—	—
2007–08	Washington Capitals	NHL	82	**65**	47	**112**	40	7	4	5	9	2
2008–09	Washington Capitals	NHL	79	**56**	54	110	72	14	11	10	21	8
2009–10	Washington Capitals	NHL	72	50	59	109	89	7	5	5	10	8
2010–11	Washington Capitals	NHL	79	32	53	85	48	9	5	5	10	10
2011–12	Washington Capitals	NHL	78	38	27	65	56	14	5	4	9	8
2012–13	Dynamo Moscow	KHL	31	19	21	40	14	—	—	—	—	—
2012–13	Washington Capitals	NHL	48	**32**	24	56	46	7	1	1	2	4
2013–14	Washington Capitals	NHL	78	**51**	28	79	49	—	—	—	—	—
2014–15	Washington Capitals	NHL	81	**53**	28	81	58	14	5	4	9	6
2015–16	Washington Capitals	NHL	79	**50**	21	71	33	12	5	7	12	2
2016–17	Washington Capitals	NHL	82	33	36	69	50	13	5	3	8	8
2017–18	Washington Capitals	NHL	82	**49**	38	87	32	24	**15**	12	27	8
2018–19	Washington Capitals	NHL	81	**51**	38	89	40	7	4	5	9	19
2019–20	Washington Capitals	NHL	68	**48**	19	67	30	8	4	1	5	2
2020–21	Washington Capitals	NHL	45	24	18	42	12	5	2	2	4	2
2021–22	Washington Capitals	NHL	77	50	40	90	18	6	1	5	6	0
2022–23	Washington Capitals	NHL	73	42	33	75	48	—	—	—	—	—
2023–24	Washington Capitals	NHL	79	31	34	65	20	4	0	0	0	0
2024–25	Washington Capitals	NHL	65	44	29	73	14	10	5	1	6	6
2025–26	Washington Capitals	NHL	82	32	32	64	26	—	—	—	—	—
RSL totals			151	36	33	69	106	21	2	4	6	35
NHL totals			1,573	929	758	1,687	857	161	77	70	147	83
KHL totals			31	19	21	40	14	—	—	—	—	—

=== International ===
Year	Team	Event	Result	GP	G	A	Pts	PIM
2002	Russia	U17		5	12	2	14	17
2002	Russia	WJC18	2nd place, silver medalist(s)	8	14	4	18	0
2003	Russia	WJC	1st place, gold medalist(s)	6	6	1	7	4
2003	Russia	WJC18	3rd place, bronze medalist(s)	6	9	4	13	6
2004	Russia	WJC	6th	6	5	2	7	25
2004	Russia	WC	10th	6	1	1	2	0
2004	Russia	WCH	QF	2	1	0	1	0
2005	Russia	WJC	2nd place, silver medalist(s)	6	7	4	11	4
2005	Russia	WC	3rd place, bronze medalist(s)	8	5	3	8	4
2006	Russia	OLY	4th	8	5	0	5	8
2006	Russia	WC	5th	7	6	3	9	6
2007	Russia	WC	3rd place, bronze medalist(s)	8	1	2	3	29
2008	Russia	WC	1st place, gold medalist(s)	9	6	6	12	8
2010	Russia	OLY	6th	4	2	2	4	2
2010	Russia	WC	2nd place, silver medalist(s)	9	5	1	6	4
2011	Russia	WC	4th	5	0	0	0	4
2012	Russia	WC	1st place, gold medalist(s)	3	2	2	4	2
2013	Russia	WC	6th	1	1	1	2	0
2014	Russia	OLY	5th	5	1	1	2	0
2014	Russia	WC	1st place, gold medalist(s)	9	4	7	11	8
2015	Russia	WC	2nd place, silver medalist(s)	2	1	1	2	0
2016	Russia	WC	3rd place, bronze medalist(s)	6	1	1	2	2
2016	Russia	WCH	SF	4	1	2	3	6
2019	Russia	WC	3rd place, bronze medalist(s)	10	2	1	3	2
Junior totals				37	53	17	70	56
Senior totals				106	45	34	79	85

== Honors, awards, and achievements ==
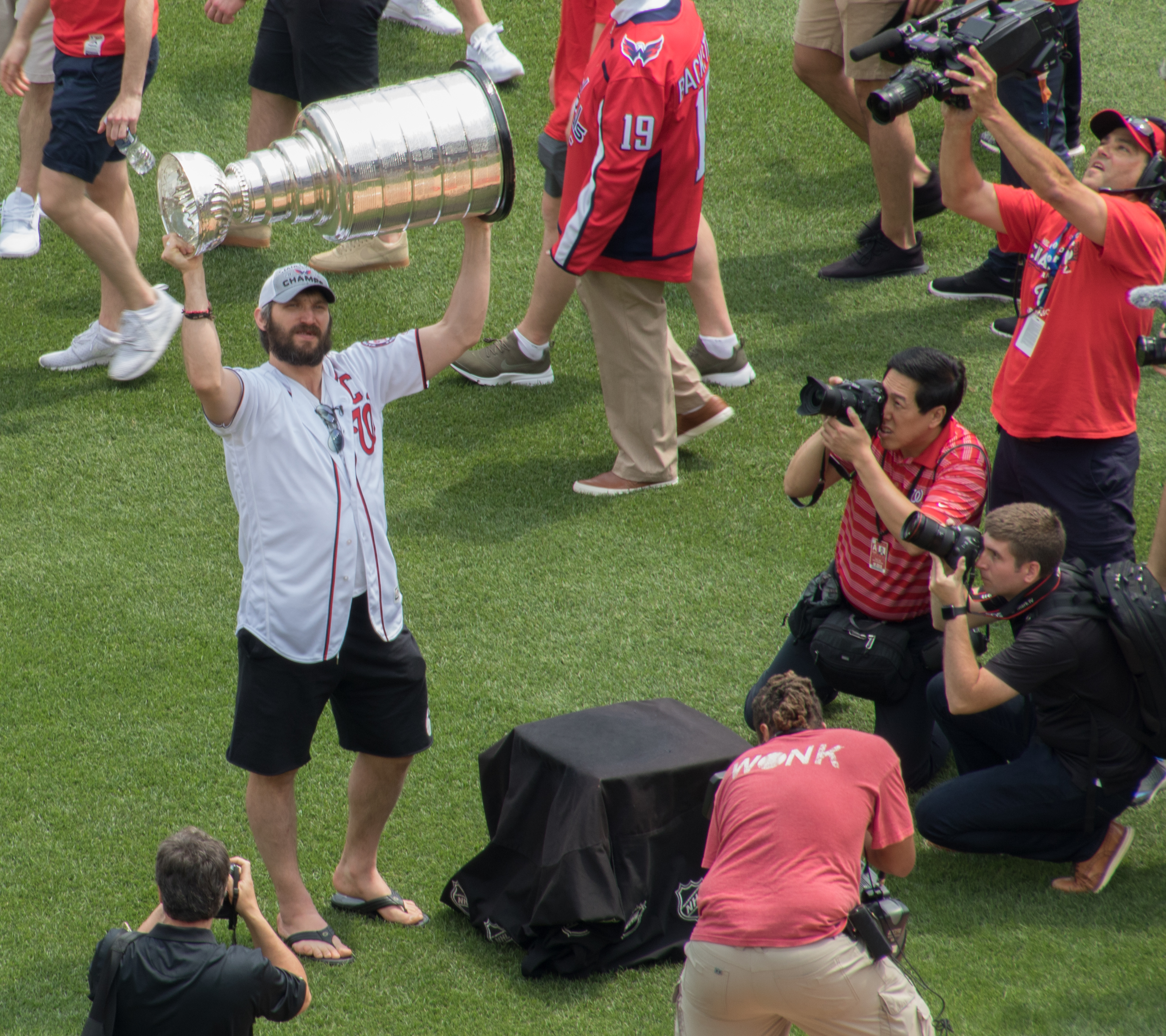
Ovechkin hoisting the Stanley Cup at Nationals Park in June 2018 following the Capitals' victory in the 2018 Stanley Cup Final.

Award	Year	Ref
NHL
Calder Memorial Trophy	2006	
NHL All-Rookie Team	2006	
NHL First All-Star team	2006, 2007, 2008, 2009, 2010, 2013, 2015, 2019	
NHL All-Star Game	2007, 2008, 2009, 2011, 2012, 2015, 2016, 2017, 2018, 2019, 2020, 2022, 2023	
EA Sports NHL cover athlete	2007, 2021	
NHL All-Star Game SuperSkills Competition Breakaway Challenge Winner	2008, 2009, 2011	
Art Ross Trophy	2008	
Maurice "Rocket" Richard Trophy	2008, 2009, 2013, 2014, 2015, 2016, 2018, 2019, 2020	
Hart Memorial Trophy	2008, 2009, 2013	
Lester B. Pearson Award/Ted Lindsay Award	2008, 2009, 2010	
NHL 2000s All-Decade First Team	2009	
NHL Second All-Star team	2011, 2013, 2014, 2016	
NHL All-Star Game SuperSkills Competition Hardest Shot Winner	2018	
Stanley Cup champion	2018	
Conn Smythe Trophy	2018	
NHL 2K cover athlete	2010	
NHL 2010s All-Decade First Team	2020	
Mark Messier Leadership Award	2025	
RSL/KHL
Russian Superleague champion	2005	
Gagarin Cup champion	2013	
International
World Junior Championships All-Star team	2005	
Winter Olympics All-Star team	2006	
World Championships All-Star team	2006, 2008	
Kharlamov Trophy	2006, 2007, 2008, 2009, 2010, 2014, 2015, 2018, 2025	
Wayne Gretzky International Award	2019	
Sources:

- Order of Honour
- Asteroid 257261 Ovechkin was named in his honor by Leonid Elenin.
- Ride of Fame honored Alex Ovechkin with a double-decker sightseeing bus in Washington, D.C.
- The day after he received his first Hart Memorial Trophy as league MVP for the 2007–08 season, he was given the key to the city by Washington Mayor Adrian M. Fenty for being the first Washington MVP winner in a major sport since Joe Theismann of the Washington Redskins in 1983.
- In 2023, was ranked number 6 in The Athletic’s list of the 100 greatest hockey players of all time

== Records ==
=== NHL official records ===
- Most regular season career goals (929)
- Most goals scored by a left wing in a career (929)
- Most goals by a left winger in a single season (65)
- Most points scored by a left wing rookie (106)
- Most career points by a left winger (1,687)
- Most career shots on goal (7,108)
- Most career game-winning goals (140)
- Most overtime goals career (27)
- Most career power-play goals (331)
- Most goaltenders scored on (189)
- Most career 30-goal seasons (20)
- Most career 40-goal seasons (14)
- Most career 50-goal seasons (9) – tied with Wayne Gretzky and Mike Bossy
- Most consecutive 30-goal seasons (15) – tied Jaromír Jágr

=== NHL unofficial records ===
- First player to win the Art Ross Trophy, Maurice Richard Trophy, Lester B. Pearson Award, and Hart Memorial Trophy in a single season. (Note: Prior to the establishment of the Richard Trophy for the league's leading goal-scorer in 1998–99, Wayne Gretzky had five seasons in which he led the league in goals and won the Art Ross, Pearson Award and Hart Trophy. Mario Lemieux also did so twice, and Phil Esposito and Guy Lafleur each did once.)
- Only player to be named to the NHL first All-Star team in each of his first five seasons
- Most goals for a single team – 929
- Most goals scored on the road in a career – 411 (As of 16 February 2023)
- Most shots on goal by a left wing in a season – 528 (2008–09)
- Most shots on goal by a rookie in a season – 425 (2005–06)
- Most regular season points by a Russian-born NHL rookie – 106 (2005–06)
- Only player to be named to both the NHL first and second All-Star teams in the same season (2012–13)
- Most goals scoring titles (9)
- Most goals by a Russian-born player – 929
- Most points by a Russian-born player – 1,687
- Most career empty net goals – (61)
- Most career game-opening goals – 136
- Most franchises scored against with a hat trick (21)
- Most Maurice Richard Trophies (9)

=== Washington Capitals records ===
- Most seasons with 50 or more goals – 9 (2005–06, 2007–08, 2008–09, 2009–10, 2013–14, 2014–15, 2015–16, 2018–19, 2021–22)
- Most shots on goal in a season – 528 (2008–09)
- Most goals in a season – 65 goals (2007–08)
- Most power play goals – 331
- Most power play goals in a season – 25 goals (2014–15)
- Most career penalty shots attempted – 12 shots (most recent on 19 January 2016)
- Most goals in a season by a rookie – 52 goals (2005–06)
- Most points in a season by a rookie – 106 points (2005–06)
- Point streak by a rookie – 11 games (17 points; 5 goals, 12 assists; 18 March–7 April 2006)
- Point streak by a rookie to start the season – 8 games
- Goal streak by a rookie – 7 games (10 February–8 March 2006)
- Most career hat tricks – 34 (as of 27 March 2026)
- Most career goals – 929
- Most career points – 1,687
- Most goals in a single postseason – 15 (2017–18)
- Fastest overtime goal (6 seconds)

== See also ==
- List of NHL players with 50-goal seasons
- List of NHL players with 500 goals
- List of NHL players with 100-point seasons
- List of NHL players with 1,000 games played
- List of NHL players with 1,000 points

== Notes ==
Awards and achievements
Preceded by Marc-André Fleury	NHL first overall draft pick 2004	Succeeded by Sidney Crosby
Preceded by Eric Fehr	Washington Capitals first-round draft pick 2004	Succeeded by Jeff Schultz
Preceded by Andrew Raycroft	Winner of the Calder Memorial Trophy; 2006	Succeeded by Evgeni Malkin
Preceded by Sidney Crosby	Winner of the Art Ross Trophy; 2008	Succeeded by Evgeni Malkin
Preceded by Sidney Crosby	Winner of the Hart Memorial Trophy; 2008, 2009	Succeeded by Henrik Sedin
Preceded by Sidney Crosby	Winner of the Lester B. Pearson Award; 2008, 2009	Renamed Ted Lindsay Award
Preceded by Vincent Lecavalier	Winner of the Rocket Richard Trophy; 2008, 2009	Succeeded by Sidney Crosby and Steven Stamkos
New award Formerly the Lester B. Pearson Award	Winner of the Ted Lindsay Award; 2010	Succeeded by Daniel Sedin
Preceded by Evgeni Malkin	Winner of the Hart Memorial Trophy; 2013	Succeeded by Sidney Crosby
Preceded by Steven Stamkos	Winner of the Rocket Richard Trophy; 2013, 2014, 2015, 2016	Succeeded by Sidney Crosby
Preceded by Sidney Crosby	Winner of the Rocket Richard Trophy; 2018, 2019, 2020 (with David Pastrňák)	Succeeded by Auston Matthews
Preceded by Sidney Crosby	Conn Smythe Trophy winner 2018	Succeeded by Ryan O'Reilly
Sporting positions
Preceded by Chris Clark	Washington Capitals team captain 2010–present	Incumbent
