= Vera Glagoleva =

Soviet and Russian actress and director

- Вера Витальевна Глаголева
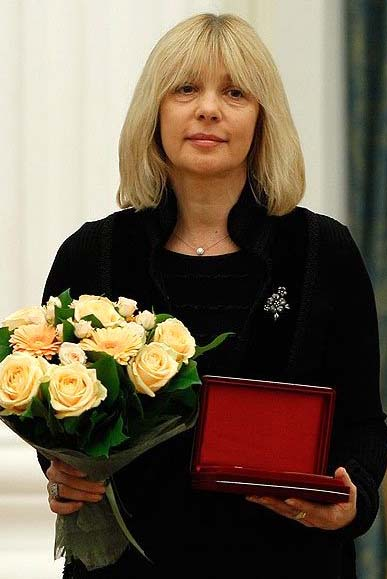
- Born: Vera Vitalievna Glagoleva; 31 January 1956; Moscow, Russian SFSR, Soviet Union
- Died: 16 August 2017 (aged 61); Baden-Baden, Germany
- Spouses: Rodion Nakhapetov (1974–1988); Kirill Shubsky
- Children: 3
- Parent(s): Vitali Glagolev; Galina Belotserkovskaya

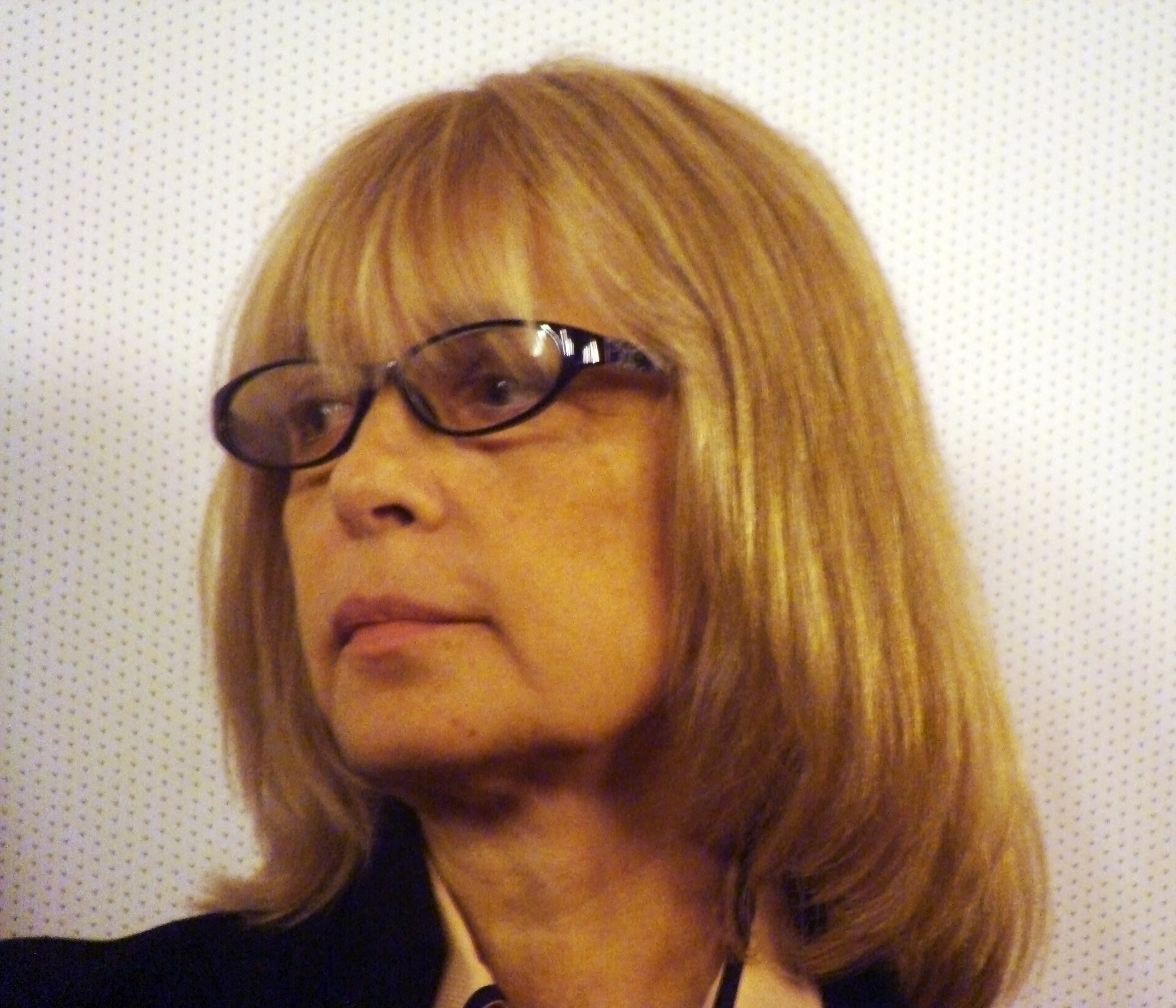
Glagoleva in October 2015

Vera Vitalievna Glagoleva (Russian: Вера Витальевна Глаголева; 31 January 1956 – 16 August 2017) was a Soviet and Russian actress and film director.

Glagoleva was born in Moscow, Russian SFSR, Soviet Union in 1956. She starred in her first film in 1975 after graduating from high school. She was known for her roles in melodramas and romantic comedies, and her most known roles were particularly in At the End of the World, Do Not Shoot at White Swans, To Marry a Captain, Poor Sasha, and in Offending Women is Not Recommended. She made her directorial debut in 1990. In 2014, her film Two Women was released, with Ralph Fiennes starring in it. Glagoleva was awarded the People's Artist of Russia in 2011.

== Personal life ==
Glagoleva was first married to actor Rodion Nakhapetov from 1974 to 1988. The couple had two children. Later, she married for the second time to businessman Kirill Shubsky and had one daughter.

Glagoleva's daughter, Nastya Shubskaya is married to hockey great Alexander Ovechkin, and acted in a commercial with her husband and his teammate, Nicklas Backstrom, for MassMutual Insurance. They have two children.

Glagoleva died at a hospital in Germany on 16 August 2017 of cancer at the age of 61.
