= Sergei Zaytsev =

Russian footballer

Personal information
- Full name: Sergei Vladimirovich Zaytsev
- Date of birth: 9 March 1969 (age 57)
- Height: 1.80 m (5 ft 11 in)
- Positions: Forward; midfielder

Youth career
- FC Saturn Andropov

Senior career*
Years	Team	Apps	(Gls)
1986	FC SKA Khabarovsk	2	(0)
1988–1991	FC Vympel Rybinsk		
1992	FC Shinnik Yaroslavl	3	(0)
1993–1995	FC Vympel Rybinsk	65	(1)
1996–1997	FC Neftyanik Yaroslavl	47	(0)
2000	FC SKA-Zvezda Rybinsk		
- * Club domestic league appearances and goals

Sergei Vladimirovich Zaytsev (Russian: Сергей Владимирович Зайцев; born 9 March 1969) is a former Russian football player.

== Club career ==
He made his Russian Premier League debut for FC Shinnik Yaroslavl on 30 August 1992 in a game against FC Fakel Voronezh.
