= Rodion Nakhapetov =

American film director

- Born: Rodion Rafailovich Nakhapetov; 21 January 1944 (age 81); Piatykhatky, Dnipropetrovsk Oblast, Ukrainian SSR, Soviet Union
- Occupations: Actor, director, screenwriter
- Years active: 1964–present
- Spouse(s): Vera Glagoleva (m. 1974; div. 1988) Natasha Shliapnikoff (m. 1991)
- Children: 2
- Awards: (1976) (1985) (1985) (2015)
- Website: rodionnahapetov.com

Rodion Rafailovich Nakhapetov (Russian: Родион Рафаилович Нахапетов; born 1944) is a Soviet-American-Russian actor, film director and screenwriter. He received the People's Artist of the RSFSR (1985). Asteroid 256697 Nahapetov, discovered by Russian amateur astronomer Timur Krjačko in 2008, was named in his honour. The official naming citation was published by the Minor Planet Center on 15 June 2011 (M.P.C. 75353).

== Filmography ==
=== As actor ===
- 1964 — There Is Such a Lad
- 1964 — The First Snow
- 1965 — I Am Twenty
- 1965 — A Mother's Heart
- 1966 — A Mother's Fidelity
- 1966 — Tenderness
- 1967 — No Password Necessary
- 1967 — Direct Line
- 1969 — Lovers
- 1969 — Old House
- 1973 — That Sweet Word: Liberty!
- 1975 — Dream and live
- 1975 — A Slave of Love
- 1978 — Suspicious
- 1980 — Valentina
- 1981 — Before the Door Closed
- 1981 — Súdim ta láskou
- 1982 — Two chapters of the family chronicle
- 1982 — The Man Who Closed the Town
- 1983 — Late Love
- 1983 — Seraphim Polubes and Other Inhabitants of the Earth
- 1983 — Torpedo
- 1984 — Forgive Us, First Love
- 1985 — Leap
- 1985 — Someone Has to...
- 1986 — Attempted Electrification
- 1988 — Flight of Birds
- 1988 — Morning Road
- 1989 — It
- 1997 — Telepath
- 2001 — Destructive Power 2
- 2001 — The Blood of Success
- 2002 — Russian in the City of Angels
- 2004 — Lovers 2
- 2004 — Border Blues
- 2005 — My Big Armenian Wedding
- 2007 — Contamination
- 2008 — Legacy
- 2013 — Swear to defend
- 2015 — Spider

=== As director ===
- 1972 — Dandelion Wine
- 1973 — With You and Without You
- 1975 — To the Edge of the World...
- 1977 — The Enemies
- 1979 — Do Not Shoot at White Swans
- 1981 — About You
- 1984 — The Follower
- 1986 — An Umbrella for Lovers
- 1987 — At the End of the Night
- 1997 — Telepath
- 2002 — Russian in the City of Angels
- 2004 — My Big Armenian Wedding
- 2004 — Border Blues
- 2007 — Contamination

=== As screenwriter ===
- 1972 — Dandelion Wine
- 1981 — About You
- 1984 — Walking Trail
- 2002 — Russian in the City of Angels
- 2004 — Border Blues
- 2007 — Contamination
