= The Dog in the Manger (disambiguation) =

The Dog in the Manger is a story and metaphor derived from an old Greek fable.

The Dog in the Manger may also refer to:

- The Dog in the Manger (play), a 1618 play by Lope de Vega
- The Dog in the Manger (1978 film), a Soviet musical-comedy film, based on the play
- The Dog in the Manger (1996 film), a Spanish film, based on the play
