= Yan Frid =

Soviet screenwriter and film director (1908–2003)

- Born: 31 May 1908; Krasnoyarsk, Russian Empire
- Died: 21 December 2003 (aged 95); Stuttgart, Germany
- Occupations: Writer, Director
- Years active: 1939–1992 (film)

Yan Borisovich Frid (Russian: Ян Борисович Фрид; 1908–2003) was a Soviet screenwriter and film director.

== Life and career ==
Yan Borisovich Frid was born on May 31, 1908, in Krasnoyarsk.

In 1932 he graduated from the directing department of the Leningrad Theatrical Institute (workshop of Vladimir Solovyov), and in 1938, from the VGIK, where his mentor was Sergei Eisenstein.

Since 1938, the director started working at Lenfilm, where he made his debut with a short film based on Anton Chekhov's short story "Surgery." Then he made the children's adventure film "Patriot".

Starting from October 1941 he participated in the Great Patriotic War. Between January 1944 and May 1945 he was head of the Army House of the Red Army of the 15th Air Army. He fought on the Leningrad and 2nd Baltic fronts. Participated in the defense and lifting of the blockade of Leningrad, the liberation of the Baltic states. He exited the war with the rank of a major. Member of the CPSU (b) since 1939.

In the early 1950s, Yan Frid filmed documentaries.

In 1953 he directed the film-play Lyubov Yarovaya, and in 1955 he adapted Twelfth Night by William Shakespeare for screen.

Later, the director made pictures of various genres, but from the beginning of the 1970s he specialized in the genre of musical film, making the film Farewell to St. Petersburg about the stay of Johann Strauss II in Russia.

Yan Frid received all-union recognition after Dog in the Manger hit the television screens, which was based on the play of Lope de Vega, with Mikhail Boyarsky Margarita Terekhova in the lead roles.

Great success awaited Yan Frid with films Die Fledermaus (based on the operetta of Johann Strauss II) with Yuri and Vitaly Solomin, Lyudmila Maksakova; "Silva" (based on Emmerich Kálmán's operetta) with Ivar Kalninsh; "Pious Marta" (Tirso de Molina) with Margarita Terekhova and Emmanuel Vitorgan; "Don Cesar de Bazan" with Anna Samokhina, Mikhail Boyarsky and Yuri Bogatyrev. In addition to the above, the director has directed the films "The Road of Truth", "Another's Trouble", The Green Carriage, "Free Wind", "Tartuffe".

In 1932–1962 Frid taught at the Leningrad Ostrovsky Theatre Institute; since 1970 he was a professor at the Saint Petersburg Conservatory.

In the mid-1990s, Yan Frid, along with his wife Victoria Gorshenina (who was an actress at the Satyricon Theater for many years) moved to permanent residence in Stuttgart, Germany.

He died on December 19, 2003, in Stuttgart.

== Selected filmography ==
- Surgery (1939)
- Lyubov Yarovaya (1953)
- Twelfth Night (1955)
- The Green Carriage (1967)
- Farewell to St. Petersburg (1972)
- The Dog in the Manger (1978)
- Die Fledermaus (1979)

== Awards ==
- Honored Art Worker of the Buryat Autonomous Soviet Socialist Republic (1951)
- Order of the Patriotic War (1945, 1985)
- Order of the Red Star (1944)
- Order of the Red Banner of Labour
- Order of Friendship (2003)

== Bibliography ==
- Klossner, Michael. The Europe of 1500–1815 on Film and Television: A Worldwide Filmography of Over 2550 Works, 1895 Through 2000. McFarland & Company, 2002.
