= Post chaise =

Horse-drawn traveling carriage

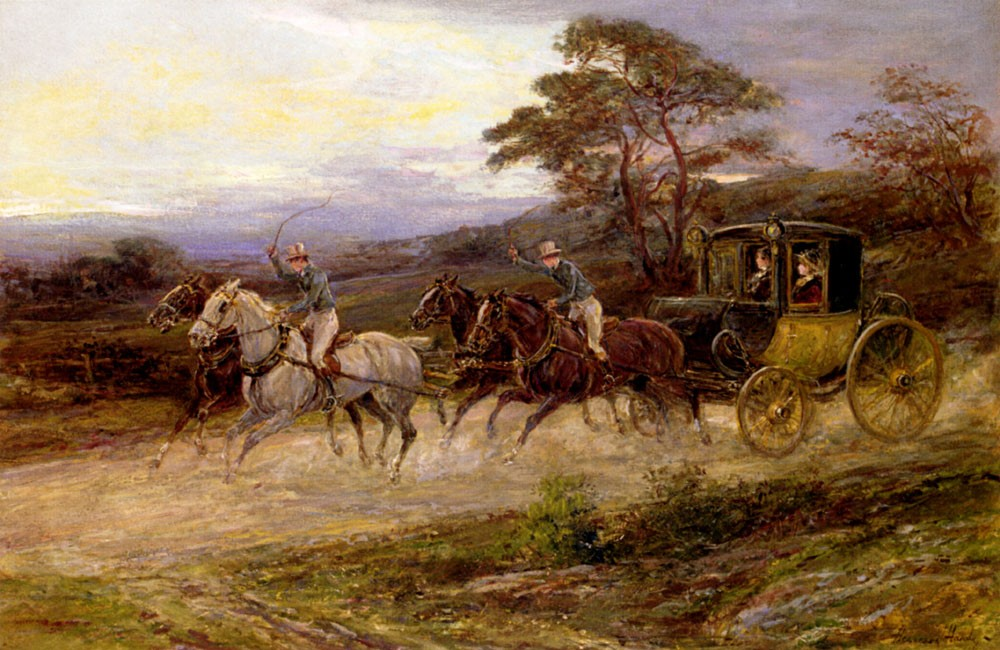
A typical post-chaise arrangement: carriage, four horses, and two postilions (riders)

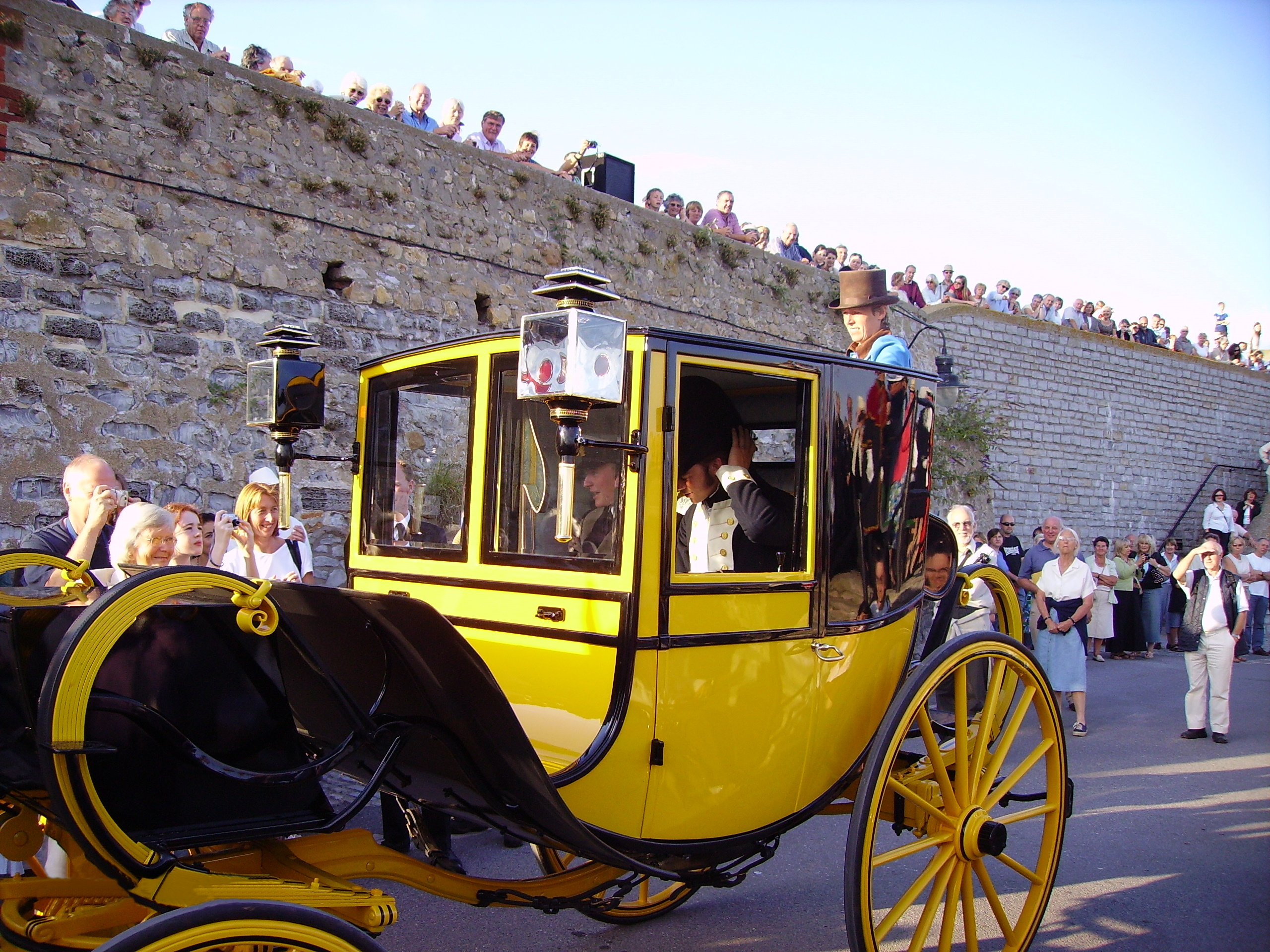
A closeup of a post chaise (2005)

A post-chaise is a travelling carriage operated in the 18th and early 19th centuries, travelling from staging post-to-post, and changing horses at each stage. With an enclosed body on four wheels, seating two people, and drawn by two or four horses, it is basically a chariot carriage with the coachman's seat removed. Riders, called postilions, rode the near-side (left) horse of each pair pulling the carriage.

Hired when long-distance travel at speed was very important, a post chaise would be taken with its own postilions and horses. At the next posting station the postilions would most likely return to their base with their own horses but might continue the journey with fresh horses.

Private posting was expensive, and passengers — particularly if the only passenger was a woman — would be accompanied by one or two of their own footmen riding behind the body of the post chaise. The footmen would be responsible for making all travel arrangements.

Private individuals did own their own post chaises; some had their light chariots made with the coachman's seat removable. Designed to withstand rapid long-distance travel, the post chaise should have been utilitarian, but private vehicles might be extravagantly decorated and finished.

== History ==
In a 1967 article in The Carriage Journal, published for the Carriage Association of America, Paul H Downing recounts that the word post is derived from the Latin postis which in turn derives from the word which means to place an upright timber (a post) as a convenient place to attach a public notice. The words postal and postage follow from this. Medieval couriers were caballari postarus or riders of the posts. The riders mounted fresh horses at each post on their route and then rode on. The word post came to be applied to the riders, then to the mail they carried, and eventually to the whole system. In England regular posts were set up in the 16th century.

The riders of the posts carried government messages and letters. The local postmasters delivered the letters as well as providing horses to the royal couriers. They also provided horses to other travellers.

The system of "posting" was common in France. An artillery officer, John Trull, entered business in England in 1743 hiring out travelling carriages. At first these carriages had two wheels but they were soon replaced by four wheel carriages given the same name, Post-chaise.

The original French design was amended, a conventional pole was fitted, no driver was provided for — leaving a view through the front window for the passengers — and the horses were ridden by postilions or post-boys. The postilions went from post to post, stayed with their own horses and took them back home at the end of that stage.

=== America ===
At that time there was no perfected posting system in America. George Washington's tour of the South in 1791 had a target (when there were no other commitments) of an average 35 miles (56 km) a day whereas in England an average speed of 8 to 10 miles per hour (13 to 16 km/h) might be achieved right round the clock.

An actual chaise is an open two-wheeled carriage with a crosswise seat for two passengers. Given two more wheels it would have been, if the name had been used then, a phaeton. A phaeton was for the owner to drive and generally drawn by one or two horses. A four-wheeled chaise would be drawn by at least four horses.

Around the time Trull was introducing post-chaises to England, Americans began to use the same name for what had been called a four-wheeled chaise.

Artwork of post-chaises

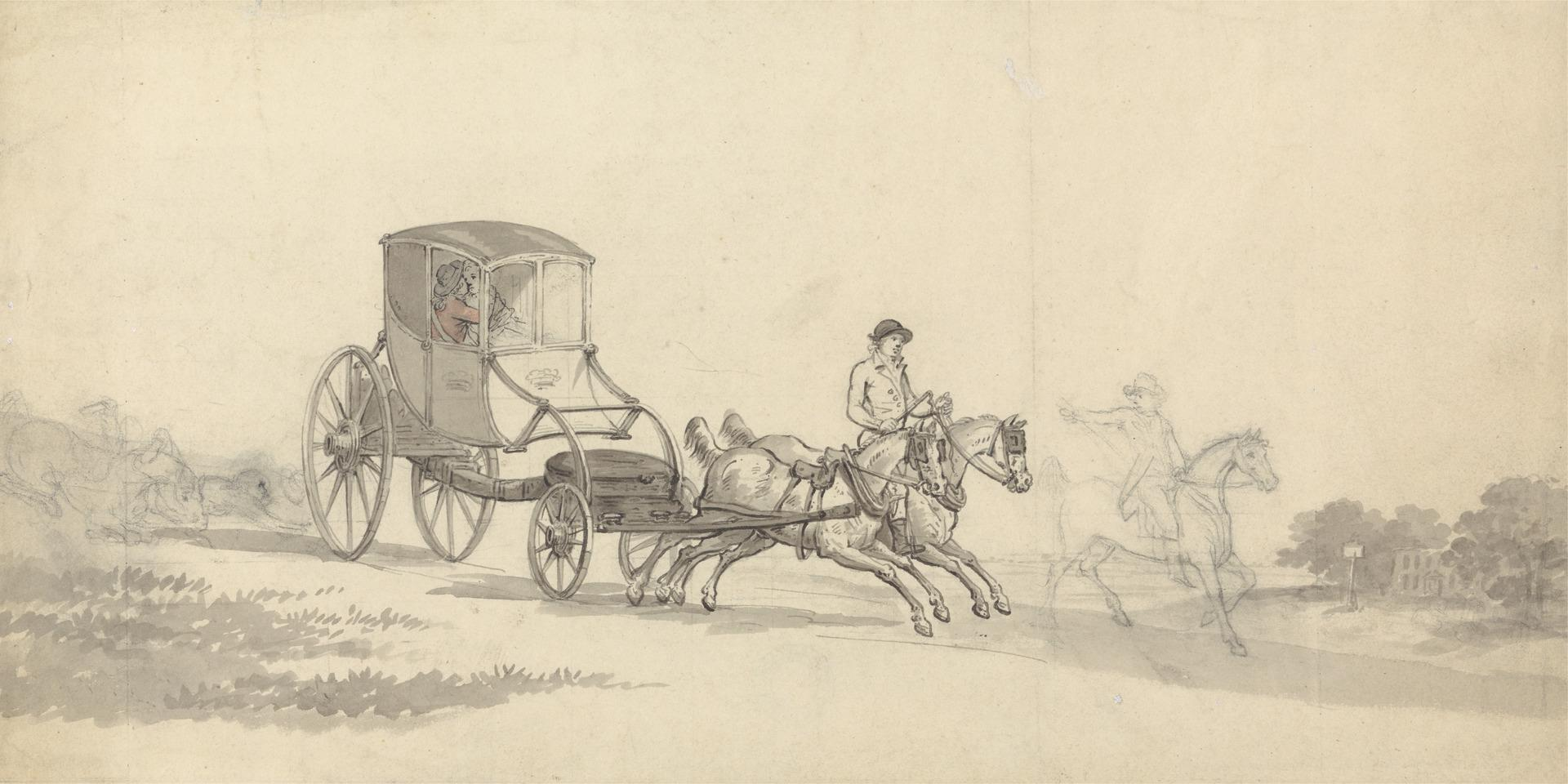
Samuel Howitt (1756–1822)

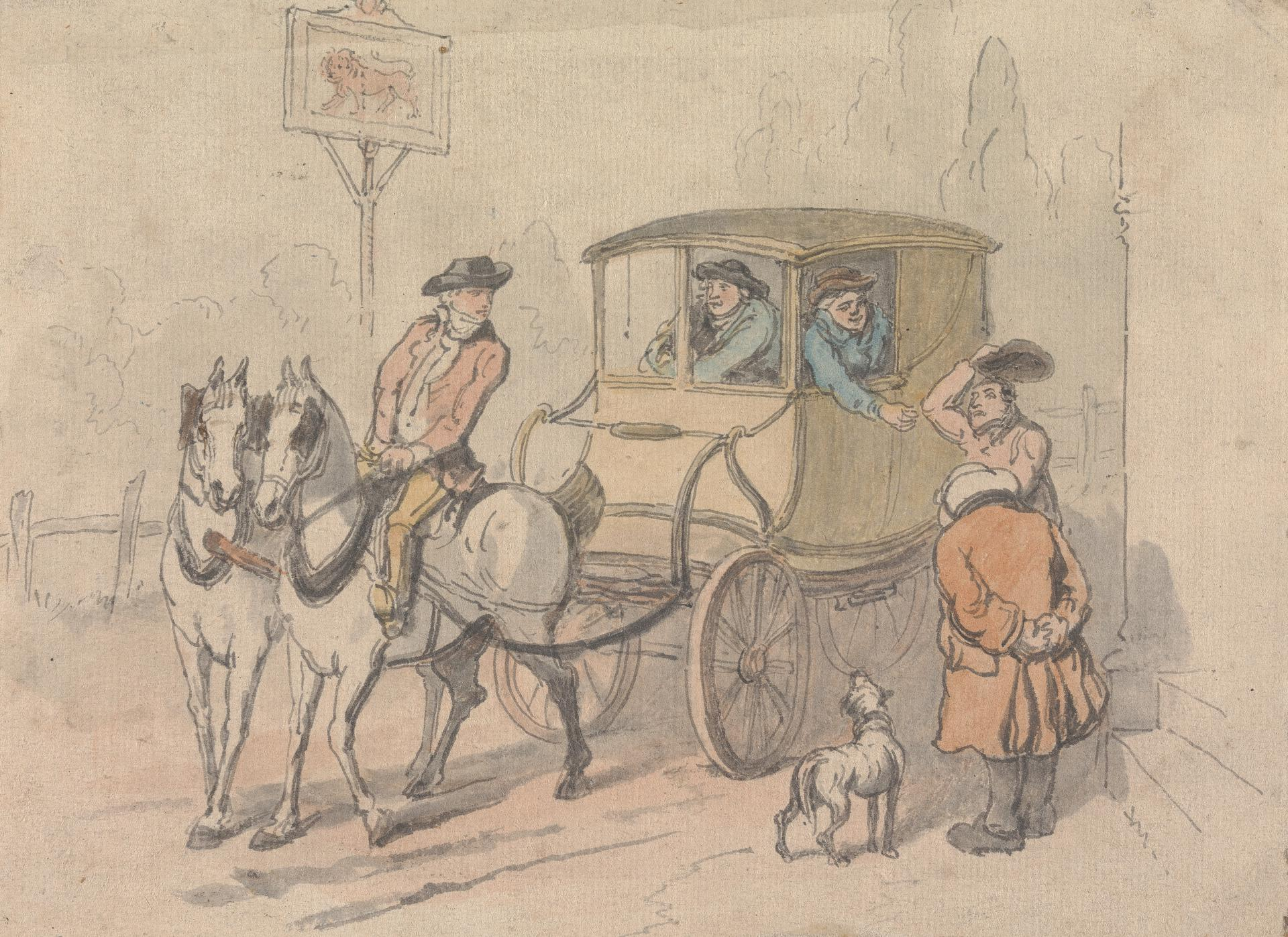
Samuel Howitt (1756–1822)

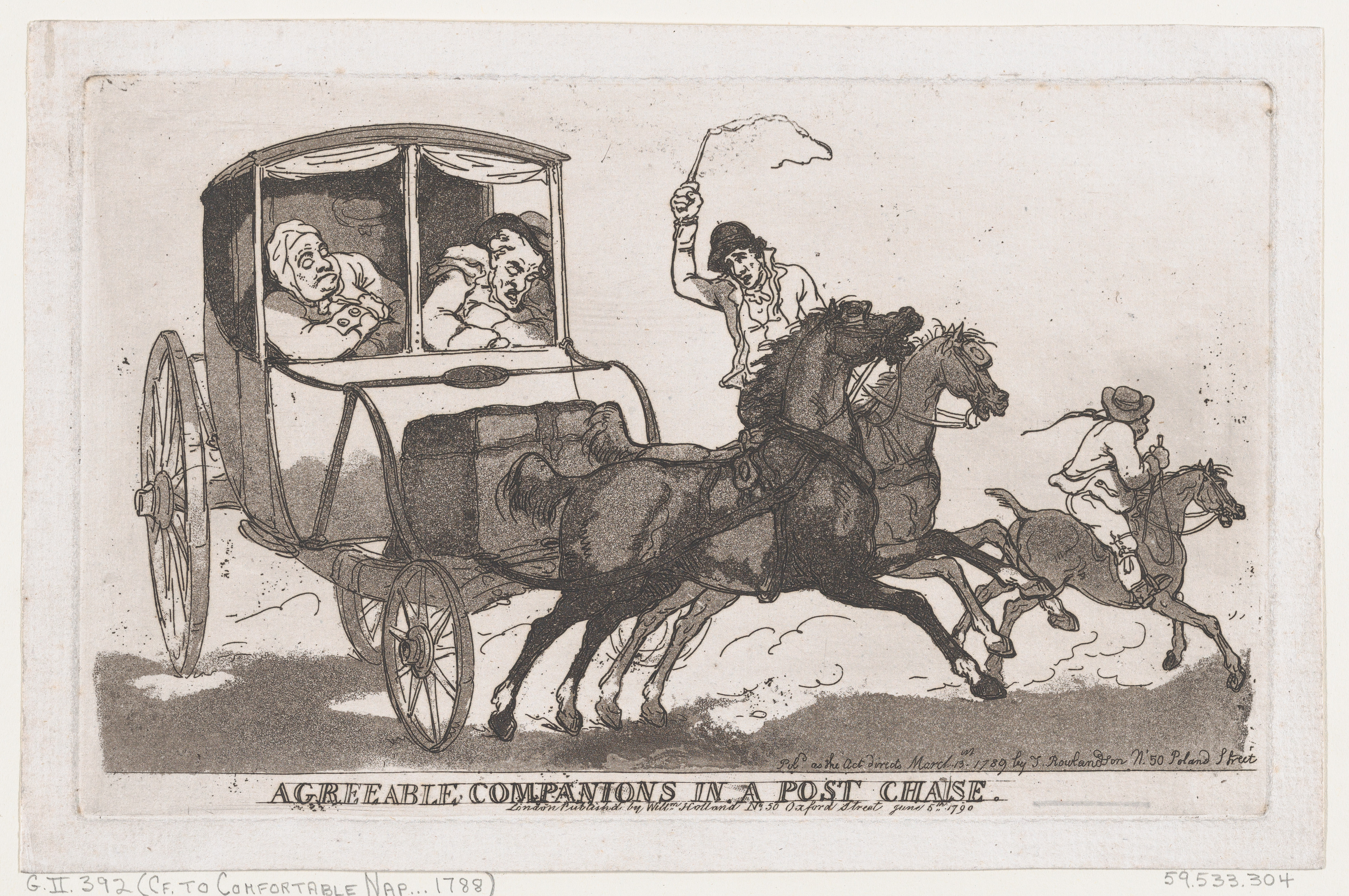
Thomas Rowlandson (1790)
