= Heavenly Slug =

- Directed by: Semyon Timoshenko
- Written by: Semyon Timoshenko
- Starring: Nikolai Kryuchkov; Vasili Merkuryev; Vasily Neschiplenko
- Music by: Vasily Solovyov-Sedoi
- Production company: Lenfilm
- Release date: 1945
- Country: Soviet Union
- Language: Russian

Heavenly Slug (Russian: Небесный тихоход, romanized: Nebesny Tikhokhod) is a 1945 Soviet comedy film directed and written by Semyon Timoshenko.

The film tells the story of three wartime fighter pilot friends, sworn to avoid love until the war's end, find their vow tested when they are reassigned to a squadron of female pilots, leading to unexpected romance and newfound respect.

== Plot ==
The film tells the story of three wartime fighter pilot friends—Vasily Bulochkin, Semyon Tucha and Sergei Kaysarov—who make a pact to remain unattached to any women until the war ends, no matter how tempting the prospect. However, the circumstances change when Major Vasily Bulochkin is reassigned to the slower, less glamorous U-2 biplane squadron after an injury renders him unfit to fly high-speed fighters. Bulochkin, accustomed to the speed and agility of fighter aircraft, initially finds his new role with the “night witches,” a squadron consisting entirely of female pilots, both humbling and frustrating.

As the men interact with the women of the U-2 squadron, their pledge begins to unravel. Kaysarov is the first to break the pact, revealing that he has secretly been married for three months. When a reporter Valentina "Valya" Petrova from Pionerskaya Pravda, arrives at the airfield, Bulochkin finds himself drawn to her and soon follows suit, abandoning his vow of bachelorhood. Meanwhile, Tucha strikes up a mutual affection with navigator Ekaterina Kutuzova, a staunch advocate for staying single. Over time, Bulochkin comes to appreciate the unique strengths of the U-2 aircraft, realizing that what he once saw as its weaknesses can be significant advantages in certain situations. He ultimately declines an offer to return to fighter aviation, choosing to remain with the U-2 squadron.

By the end of the film, the U-2 is officially renamed the Po-2 in honor of its designer, Nikolai Polikarpov. The three friends each dance with their new partners: Kaysarov with his wife Svetlova, Bulochkin with Valentina, and Tucha with Kutuzova. Tucha even jokes about forming a new kind of “squadron” with Kutuzova—a family unit, neither fully male nor female, but mixed. Valentina introduces Bulochkin and his friends to her father, a general in the air force, who good-naturedly points out the irony of the self-proclaimed bachelors succumbing to romance. The film ends with a celebration of newfound connections and mutual respect among the pilots.

== Facts ==
In 1944 Joseph Stalin ordered the production a lighthearted war comedy. The film was shot in 1944-1945 while the war was still going on. Filming began near Leningrad, right after the end of the Leningrad Blockade. At the start of the movie one can see the original Yelagin Palace ruined during bombing (it was later rebuilt). In the dance scene female parts are performed by professional dancers from the youth war ensemble headed by Arkady Obrant. The ensemble gave around 3000 performances during the war, both at the front line and in the cities, including Leningrad during the blockade. The film was shown in theaters on April 1, 1946 to great success. It was the first Soviet post-war comedy film. Despite the success with the audience, critics met the film coldly.

In the film Vasily Bulochkin (played by Nikolai Kryuchkov) falls in love with Valya Petrova (played by Alla Parfanyak). After the end of shooting the actor Nikolai Kryuchkov also divorced his first wife and married Alla Parfanyak. They lived together for 12 years.

In 1970 the film was "restored". As with many other films of the Stalinist era, it was redubbed (mostly by the same actors, although Ranevskay's part was given to a different actress with a different voice) and censored. About 10 minutes were cut out from the original film, including the scene where Soviet newspaper Pionerskaya Pravda is compared to The Times.

By 2012, the restoration and colorization of the film was completed by order of Channel One. It was also fully restored: this time with original scenes and voices. The colorized version of the film was shown on May 6, 2012.

== Cast ==
- Nikolai Kryuchkov as major Vasily Bulochkin
- Vasili Merkuryev as senior lieutenant Semyon Tucha
- Vasily Neschiplenko as captain Sergei Kaisarov
- Alla Parfanyak as Valya Petrova, reporter of the newspaper Pionerskaya Pravda and the daughter of an aviation Major General
- Lyudmila Glazova as senior lieutenant Ekaterina Kutuzova
- Tamara Alyoshina as lieutenant Masha Svetlova
- Faina Ranevskaya as professor of medicine
- Konstantin Skorobogatov as Konstantin Vasilyevich Petrov, aviation Major General
- Vladimir Taskin as a German Flying ace
