= Die Fledermaus (1979 film) =

Soviet operetta film

- Written by: Yan Frid
- Directed by: Yan Frid
- Starring: Yury Solomin; Lyudmila Maksakova; Vitaly Solomin; Larisa Udovichenko
- Music by: Johann Strauss II
- Country of origin: Soviet Union
- Original language: Russian

Production
- Cinematography: Anatoliy Nazarov
- Running time: 141 minutes
- Production company: Lenfilm

Original release
- Release: 1979

Die Fledermaus (Russian: Летучая мышь, romanized: Letuchaya mysh) is a 1979 Soviet two-part operetta film directed by Yan Frid. It is based on Johann Strauss II's 1874 work of the same name.

== Plot ==
The Viennese banker Heinrich Eisenstein has committed a minor offense for which he must go to jail. However, his friend Falke, director of a local theater, persuades him to spend this evening at a ball given by the well-known patron of art, Prince Orlovsky, who came from Russia. For the sake of this celebration, Heinrich is ready to postpone the prison and also do something more difficult — to lie to his wife Rosalinde. But what he does not suspect is that the insidious Falke decided to play a prank on him with the help of Heinrich's own maid Adele, who, according to Falke's plan, should also come to the ball in a spectacular costume of a bat and seduce her master. Adele agrees to this step, but only because she wants to become an actress in Falke's theater and by successfully tricking Heinrich she will prove her acting abilities.

Heinrich is making it look as though he is getting ready for prison, but in reality what he prepares for is a night of dance and fun. Rosalinde, accidentally overhearing the conversation between Falke and Adele, finds out where her husband is going to spend the night. Adele tries to ask Rosalinde for permission to visit the grave of her grandmother, but when caught in a lie confesses everything to the hostess. A clever plan is born in Rosalinde's mind as to how to teach her mischievous husband and his frivolous friend a lesson. To do this, she decides to appear in the attire of the bat herself at the ball, and to send Adele there under the guise of some baroness.

After the friends depart from Eisenstein's house, Alfred arrives, who is a student and a secret admirer of Rosalinde. At first Rosalinde does not want to let him in, but then she allows him inside, since Heinrich will soon have a prison coach coming. Rosalinde gets the unlucky admirer drunk and sends him to prison in her husband's stead.

Meanwhile, Heinrich and Falke are having an enjoyable time. In the midst of the merriment of the ball come Rosalinde and Adele. The husband does not recognize his wife under the mask and starts to passionately flirt with her. Having lost his head, he gives her a watch as a sign of loyalty which was previously given to him by Rosalinde herself. And the "baroness", meanwhile, successfully charms many admirers who are ready to immediately offer her their hand in marriage.

In the morning after the ball Heinrich goes to prison to serve his sentence, but with amazement learns that there is already an "Eisenstein" sitting there who requires a lawyer. Suspecting his wife of infidelity, Heinrich, in the guise of a lawyer, intends to find out the details, convict the traitor and punish him. But instead he gets caught himself due to the recklessly presented watch and ends up asking his wife for forgiveness, which he receives. As a result, the frivolous friends are embarrassed and forgiven, the student gets deserved freedom, and the talented maid — a place of an actress in the theater.

== Cast ==
- Yury Solomin — Heinrich Eisenstein, Rosalinde's husband, baron (sings Vladimir Barlyaev)
- Lyudmila Maksakova — Rosalind Eisenstein, wife of Heinrich, baroness (sings Larisa Shevchenko)
- Vitaly Solomin — Falke, Heinrich's friend, theater director (sings Alexander Murashko)
- Larisa Udovichenko — Adele, a maid in the house of Eisenstein, an actress (sings Sofia Yalysheva)
- Oleg Vidov — Alfred, Rosalinde's admirer, a student (sings Makar Alpatov)
- Yuri Vasiliev — Prince Orlovsky (sings Vyacheslav Timoshin)
- Igor Dmitriev — Frank, director of the prison (sings Boris Smolkin)
- Yevgeny Vesnik — Prosecutor Amedey, husband of Amalia, father of Lotta
- Glikeriya Bogdanova-Chesnokova — Amalia, the wife of the prosecutor, Lotta's mother
- Olga Volkova — Lotta, daughter of Amalia and prosecutor Amedeya
- Sergey Filippov — forester / waiter
- Ivan Lyubeznov — Frosch, duty jailer
- Vladimir Lyakhovitsky — Frosch's assistant
- Aleksandr Demyanenko — Blind, lawyer
