= Mama, I'm Alive =

- Film poster
- Directed by: Konrad Wolf
- Written by: Wolfgang Kohlhaase
- Starring: Peter Prager
- Cinematography: Werner Bergmann
- Edited by: Evelyn Carow
- Release date: 24 February 1977
- Running time: 103 minutes
- Countries: East Germany; Soviet Union
- Languages: German, Russian

Mama, I'm Alive (German: Mama, ich lebe) is a 1977 East German and Soviet film directed by Konrad Wolf. It was chosen as East Germany's official submission to the 50th Academy Awards for Best Foreign Language Film, but did not manage to receive a nomination. It was also entered into the 27th Berlin International Film Festival.

== Plot ==
In a Soviet prisoner-of-war camp, the German soldiers Becker, Pankonin, Koralewski and Kuschke have decided to work with the Red Army against the German troops. The Baltic-Soviet Major Mauris accompanies the new comrades, now wearing Soviet uniforms, to the front.

On their long journey on the train, which is very comfortable by wartime standards, the four get to know the people and living conditions of the country they once fought against and reflect on their situation. The viewer gradually learns the story of each of them and can understand their inner development.

When they arrive at the front, only three of them decide to take up arms against their fellow countrymen. At the decisive moment, however, they hesitate to shoot at them, resulting in the death of their Soviet comrade and friend Kolja.

Meanwhile, the fourth of them, Pankonin, has taken on the task of listening in on German radio transmissions together with the Red Army woman Svetlana. He and Svetlana fall in love.

Finally, three of them, chosen by lot, are dropped behind enemy lines for a commando operation in German uniforms and are killed trying to get back to the Soviet side. Among the dead is Svetlana's lover Pankonin.

The only survivor was Becker, who had received a note from a fellow German prisoner in the camp with his address and the sentence "Mama, I'm alive".

== Cast ==
- Peter Prager as Günther Becker
- Uwe Zerbe as Walter Pankonin
- Eberhard Kirchberg as Karl Koralewski
- Detlef Gieß as Helmuth Kuschke
- Donatas Banionis as Mauris
- Margarita Terekhova as Svetlana
- Ivan Lapikov as General
- Yevgeni Kindinov as Victor Glunsky
- Bolot Bejshenaliyev as Chingiz
- Mikhail Vaskov as Kolya
- Anatoli Papanov as home owner
- Anatoli Rudakov as Vasya
- Svetlana Kryuchkova as Military headquarters in Chingiz

== See also ==
- List of submissions to the 50th Academy Awards for Best Foreign Language Film
- List of German submissions for the Academy Award for Best Foreign Language Film
