= Twelfth Night (1955 film) =

Soviet film by Yan Frid

Dvenadtsataya noch
- Directed by: Yan Frid
- Written by: Yan Frid; William Shakespeare (play)
- Based on: Twelfth Night by William Shakespeare
- Produced by: Yan Frid
- Starring: Klara Luchko; Alla Larionova
- Cinematography: Yevgeny Shapiro
- Music by: Aleksey Zhivotov
- Production company: Lenfilm
- Release date: 21 November 1955 (Soviet Union)
- Running time: 90 minutes
- Country: Soviet Union
- Language: Russian

Twelfth Night (Russian: Двенадцатая ночь, transliteration Dvenadtsataya noch) is a 1955 Soviet romantic comedy-drama film produced by Lenfilm, based on Shakespeare's play Twelfth Night, or What You Will. The script was written by Yan Frid. The film was released in the Soviet Union on 21 November 1955, and in the United States on 3 March 1956.

== Plot ==
During a storm at sea, a shipwreck separates twin siblings Viola and Sebastian. Viola lands in the country of Illyria, and later, her brother arrives there as well. Viola meets Duke Orsino and falls in love with him. To stay close to her beloved, she disguises herself as a man, taking the name Cesario to enter his service. Orsino, who loves the beautiful Olivia, sends "Cesario" to deliver messages of his love. However, Olivia instantly falls in love with "Cesario."

Olivia’s household is home to a lively group: her uncle Sir Toby, the servants Maria and Fabian, and the fool Feste. These four amuse themselves in various ways, often at the expense of others. One of their targets is Sir Andrew Aguecheek, a guest in the house. They also play a cruel prank on Olivia’s pompous steward, Malvolio.

In the end, after a series of comedic and occasionally dramatic situations where Sebastian is mistaken for Viola and vice versa, the twins are reunited. The misunderstandings are resolved: Sebastian finds happiness in marrying Olivia, while Orsino realizes that the person he truly loves is not Olivia, but Viola.

== Cast ==
- Klara Luchko as Viola/Sebastian
- Alla Larionova as Olivia
- Vadim Medvedev as Duke Orsino
- Mikhail Yanshin as Sir Toby Belch
- Georgi Vitsin as Sir Andrew Aguecheek
- Vasili Merkuryev as Malvolio
- Bruno Freindlich as Feste
- Sergei Filippov as Fabian
- Anna Lisyanskaya as Maria
- Nina Urgant as a maidservant
- Aleksandr Antonov as Sea Captain
- Sergei Lukyanov as Antonio
