= The Bear and the Bees =

North Italian fable

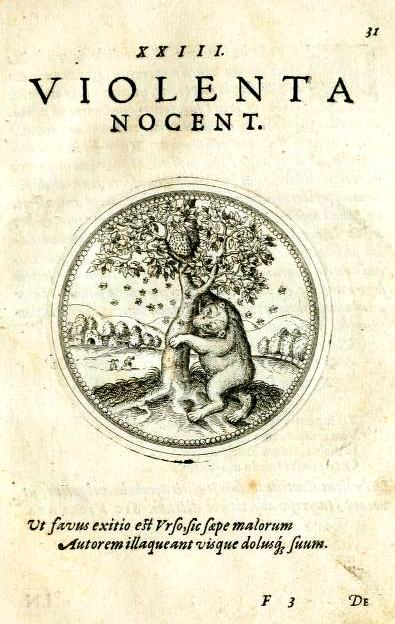
Emblem 23 from the Symbolorum et Emblematum Centuriae Quatuor of Joachim Camerarius

The Bear and the Bees is a fable of North Italian origin that became popular in other countries between the 16th - 19th centuries. There it has often been ascribed to Aesop's fables, although there is no evidence for this and it does not appear in the Perry Index. Various versions have been given different interpretations over time and artistic representations have been common.

== A question of ascription ==
Fable collections since the 16th century have ascribed the fable of "The Bear and the Bees" to Aesop, although in fact its first appearance was under the title De urso et apibus among the hundred short fables in Laurentius Abstemius' Hecatomythium (1495). In 1519 all of these were subsequently included, along with the work of other authors, in the Aesop compilation associated with Martinus Dorpius (1485–1525), which then went into many editions across Europe. But whereas several of those other authors had only translated from Greek into Latin fables traditionally ascribed to Aesop, the work of Abstemius was largely original.

Sometimes Abstemius had taken his ideas from popular material like, for example, already existing proverbs for which he provided an explanatory framework. In the case of "The Bear and the Bees" he made use of a symbol in an earlier Italian work of pious morality from the first half of the 15th century, the "Flowers of Virtue and of Manners" (Fiore de virtu e de costumi). There it was stated that "Anger can be connected to the bear eating honey", followed by a description of how a bear stung by a bee will chase it until another stings him; his anger then becomes diverted and he starts to chase that one and so never kills any. The passage was accompanied by illustrations of bees swarming round the bear's head in both the 15th century and the 16th century.

In this instance Abstemius has provided a structured narrative leading to a more general moral conclusion in a text soon to be incorporated into the body of Aesopic lore.

== Interpretations ==
=== Diplomacy and politics ===
When Roger L'Estrange compiled his Fables of Aesop and Other Eminent Mythologists (1692), those of Abstemius and other authors in the Dorpius collection were translated under their own names and kept apart from those ascribed to Aesop in the main body of the book in a rare acknowledgement of his authorship. L'Estrange's version is slightly more condensed even than his: "A Bear was so enrag'd once at the Stinging of a Bee, that he ran like mad into the Bee-Garden, and over-turn'd all the Hives in revenge. This Outrage brought them out in whole Troops upon him; and he came afterwards to bethink himself, how much more advisable it had been to pass over one Injury, than by an unprofitable Passion to provoke a Thousand."

Just as Abstemius had seen the moral merit of the Mediaeval symbol of the bear and the bees, so the compilers of Renaissance Emblem books were to follow him in using it to point to the consequences of giving way to anger. Joachim Camerarius the Younger included it under the title Violenta Nocent as Emblem 23 in his Symbolorum et Emblematum Centuriae Quatuor (1595). The accompanying distich warns that violence brings ill to its author and Camerarius goes on to comment that the Italian writer Luca Contile had earlier associated the symbol with violence. Another who used the emblem was Cristoph Murer under the title of Libido Vindictae (desire for vengeance) in XL emblemata miscella nova, which was posthumously published in 1620. He also noted that rage is immediately followed by a similar reply.

French and English authors who include the fable in their collections often stay close to the Abstemius version. In Isaac de Benserade's Les fables d'Ésope, mises en françois, avec le sens moral en quatre vers (1678), the warning on which he closes is to beware of calling up many enemies by seeking vengeance on one. Robert Dodsley tells his version of a bear taking revenge for a single sting and coming to the painful conclusion of how much better it would have been "to have patiently acquiesced in one injury, than thus by an unprofitable resentment to have provoked a thousand".

But beyond the generalised moral message, the Cavalier losers in the English Civil War saw in the fable a further application as advising acquiescence in their own circumstances for a while rather than stirring up endless civil strife and further personal misery. So John Ogilby's "The Bear and Bees" ends by counseling against "Making a private quarrel national", while Francis Barlow's illustration of "The Bear and Beehives" is summed up by the verse, "So petty tumults, by the rout persu'd, / Have often mighty common wealths subdu'd". Nor were they the only ones to realise that the fable was politically adaptable. A poem of the same title as Barlow's was written by one English patriot to refer to the likely result of Napoleon's Continental System after 1806. Later in the 19th century, the illustrator John Tenniel, realising that the bear was traditionally the symbol for Russia, used the fable in a cartoon for the satirical magazine Punch to comment on the outcome of Russia's belligerence towards the Turks in 1853.

=== Self-restraint and religion ===
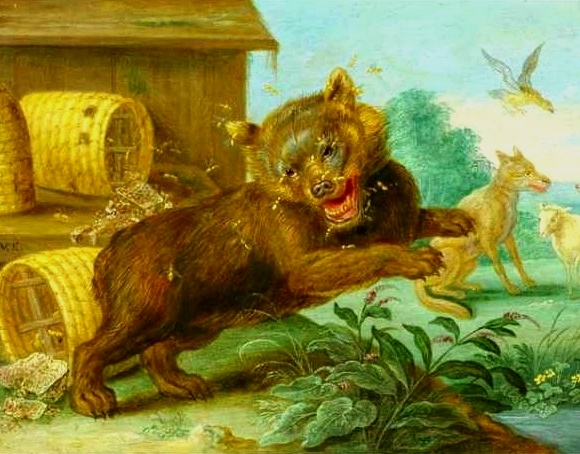
The fable of the bear and the bees by Jan van Kessel, oil on copper, 1672

A different moral reading of the fable occurs in another Emblem book, Eduard de Dene's De Warachtighe Fabulen der Dieren (true animal fables, 1567). The illustration there of "The Bear and the Honey-bees" by Marcus Gheeraerts the Elder was eventually used for a trencher in England with a translation of the moral about the rim: "The bees do feircely sting the Beare/ While he their hony Hives do tear/ So some that Pleasure seek in Haste/ With sower Sawce their Sweet do taste." It is not the bear's angry response that is emphasised in De Clerck's version of the fable but its despotic greed.

English and French writers adopted this interpretation in different ways. When it appeared in George Wither's A collection of emblems: ancient and modern (1635), he was reusing the German plates of Gabriel Rollenhagen from twenty years earlier. Device 23 pictures the bear scrambling up a tree, his head surrounded by angry bees, and has the title Patior Ut Potiar (suffering for success). The accompanying poem points out that as the bear is prepared to suffer in pursuit of its appetite, so should the virtuous aspire to grow. James Merrick's poem of "The bears and the bees" (1763) introduces two of the animals (as had the 16th century illustration of Flowers of Virtue and of Manners). Though it concludes that "Pleasure's ever bought with pain", it does not draw the same moral parallel. The poem was much reprinted, including by Thomas Bewick in his 1818 edition of Select Fables of Aesop.

Meanwhile, in France Claude Joseph Dorat versified the story as L'ours et les mouches à miel in his Fables nouvelles (1773). His conclusion was that we should moderate our desires since, in a reversion of the earlier moral lesson, "At the heart of our pleasures, pain is born". Advancing further down the religious path, the 18th century churchman Samuel Croxall interpreted the stung bear's self-laceration as the pain of remorse. The Catholic writer William Henry Anderdon followed him in The Christian Æsop: ancient fables teaching eternal truths (1871), seeing in the episode a lesson in the need for confession as the accompaniment of penitent sorrow.

== The fable in the applied arts ==
On both occasions where the fable has been made a subject by painters, it has been as part of a set. In the case of Jan van Kessel the Elder, the other three scenes included "The Wolf, the Deer and the Sheep", "The Lion and the Boar" and "The Sick Stag". Though he often had a unifying theme when creating such sets, none has been suggested here, other than that all are fables by Aesop. Where the "Bear attacked by bees" of Georg Ernst Sandner (1736–1811) is concerned, its companion piece, "A boar sow and its young", is not a fable. Both paintings feature black-coloured animals at the centre of a verdant landscape.

Since the fable was short and featured only a single episode, it did not furnish much scope for illustrators who, for the most part, confined themselves to depicting a bear crouching by an overturned skep and trying to protect its muzzle and eyes from the encircling bees. Such illustrations lent themselves to use in ornamenting domestic items, such as the wooden fireplace in Somerset House, Halifax, West Yorkshire, from about 1760 or the design on a 1770 Royal Worcester painted plate. A century later, the fable figured on the set of six tiles produced by the Mintons Hollins company. The source of the illustrations for these is documented as the copperplates in Samuel Howitt's album A New Work of Animals (1811), which was largely devoted to Aesop's fables.

In the 20th century there was the animated feature film, The Bears and the Bees (1932), although this retained little more of the original fable's story-line than that bees will combine effectively against a large marauder.
