= Vasili Merkuryev =

Soviet actor

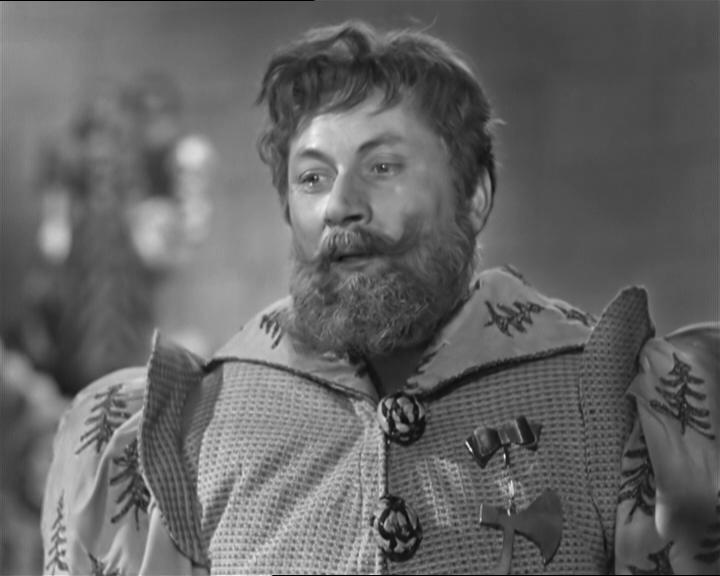
- Born: Vasili Vasilyevich Merkuryev; 6 April 1904; Ostrov, Pskov Governorate, Russian Empire
- Died: 12 May 1978 (aged 74); Leningrad, Soviet Union
- Education: Saint Petersburg State Theatre Arts Academy
- Occupations: Actor, theater director, pedagogue
- Years active: 1920–1978
- Children: 1

Vasili Vasilyevich Merkuryev (Russian: Васи́лий Васи́льевич Мерку́рьев; 6 April 1904 – 12 May 1978) was a Soviet and Russian stage and film actor, theater director and pedagogue. People's Artist of the USSR (1960). Stanislavsky State Prize of the RSFSR (1979 – posthumously).

== Biography ==
Vasili Merkuryev was born into a mixed Russian-German family. His father Vasily Ilyich Merkuryev was a Russian laborer turned merchant. He ran a successful business selling tar and fish. His mother Anna Ivanovna Grossen was of German descent. She emigrated from Switzerland along with her brother Heinrich. Vasili was the fourth of their six sons.

He was raised in his native town of Ostrov and became an actor of the local theater at the age of 16. In 1921 he moved to Petrograd and entered the Saint Petersburg State Theatre Arts Academy which he finished in 1926. He later returned to the academy to work as a teacher and became a professor in 1961. Between 1926 and 1937 Merkuryev had worked in five different drama theaters, all based in Leningrad. In 1937 he entered the Alexandrinsky Theatre where he served till his death, both as an actor and stage director.

He is mostly remembered for his comedy roles in movies such as True Friends (1954), Heavenly Slug (1945) and Cinderella (1947). He also played one of the main parts in the war drama The Cranes Are Flying directed by Mikhail Kalatozov that won the Palme d'Or at the 1958 Cannes Film Festival.

He continued his theater and movie career when the war started. During the evacuation he served as a director of the Narym Theater (1942-1944), as well as a director of the Novosibirsk Youth Theatre in 1944-1945.

Merkuryev died on 12 May 1978 in Leningrad. He was buried in the Volkovo Cemetery.

== Family ==
Vasili Merkuryev was married to Irina Meyerhold, daughter of the acclaimed Russian/Soviet stage director Vsevolod Meyerhold, also of German descent. Together they had two daughters (Anna and Ekaterina) and one son Pyotr Merkuryev (1943—2010), who also became a prominent Soviet/Russian actor and musicologist.

Merkuryev had five brothers, each of them lived a very different and tragic life.

- Leonid (1896—1915) was killed during World War I.
- Aleksandr (1898—1942) lived in Leningrad and starved to death during the Leningrad Blockade.
- Yevgeny (1900) was a Russian composer and conductor who left Russia after the October Revolution with his German uncle and was never heard from ever again.
- Pyotr (1906—1940) was arrested in 1939 during the Stalinist repressions and died in prison. His children Vitaly, Yevgeny and Natalia - were adopted by Vasili. He also named his own son in the memory of his brother. Yevgeny Merkuryev (1936—2007) became a famous Soviet/Russian actor as well.
- Vladimir died at the age of 9.

During the war Vasili Merkuryev also adopted two children who had lost their parents. They had lived with him up till 1947 when their mother was found. By that time Merkuryev's family consisted of 14 people.

== Filmography ==
- Girl Friends (1936) – Postman
- The Return of Maxim (1937) – Student-Menshevik
- The Defense of Volotchayevsk (1937) – Drunk docker
- Komsomolsk (1938) – Construction military representative
- Professor Mamlock (1938) – Krause
- Member of the Government (1939) – Stashkov
- Tanker "Derbent" (1941) – Aleksei Petrovich Dogailo, boatswain
- Heavenly Slug (1945) – Senior lieutenant Semyon Tucha
- The Great Glinka (1946) – Yakob Ulyanych Ulanov – Stalin Prize second degree (1947)
- The Vow (1946) – General Nikolay Voronov
- Cinderella (1947) – Forester
- Tale of a True Man (1948) – Stepan Ivanovich, starshina – Stalin Prize second degree (1949)
- The Star (1949) – Anikanov, starshina
- The Battle of Stalingrad (1949) – General Nikolay Voronov
- The Miners of Donetsk (1950) – Sidor Trofimovich Gorovoy, mine manager – Stalin Prize second degree (1952)
- The Unforgettable Year 1919 (1951) – Bryzgalov
- The Encounter of a Lifetime (1952) – Vasily Nikanorovich
- Jambyl (1952) – Doctor
- A Comrade's Honour (1953) – Starshina Privalov
- World Champion (1954) – Fyodor Ivanovich Bessonov, wrestling coach
- True Friends (1954) – Vasily Vasilyevich Nestratov, architecture academician
- Did We Meet Somewhere Before (1954) – Anatoly Verkhoturov, theater director
- Twelfth Night (1955) – Malvolio
- World Champion (1955) – Fyodor Bessonov
- Behind the Footlights (1956) – Lev Gurych Sinichkin, actor
- The Cranes Are Flying (1957) – Fyodor Ivanovich
- People on the Bridge (1959) – Ivan Denisovich Bulygin
- Chronicle of Flaming Years (1960) – Bogdanovsky, surgeon
- Sleepless Night (1960) – Snegiryov
- Splendid Days (1960) – Uncle Kostya
- Cherry Town (1962) – Fyodor Mikhailovich Drebednyov
- Whistle Stop (1963) – Pavel Pavlovich, academician
- Roll Call (1965) – General Viktor Ilyich Zhuravlyov
- A Nest of Gentry (1969) – Sergei Petrovich Gedeonovsky
- The Seven Brides of Lance-Corporal Zbruyev (1970) – Vasily Vasilyevich Lukyanov
- Farewell to St. Petersburg (1971) – Leybrok
- Moscow-Cassiopeia (1973) – Nikolai Kirillovich Blagovidov
- Ksenia, Fedor's Beloved Wife (1974) – Personnel department manager
