= Stage station =

Place of rest provided for stagecoach travelers

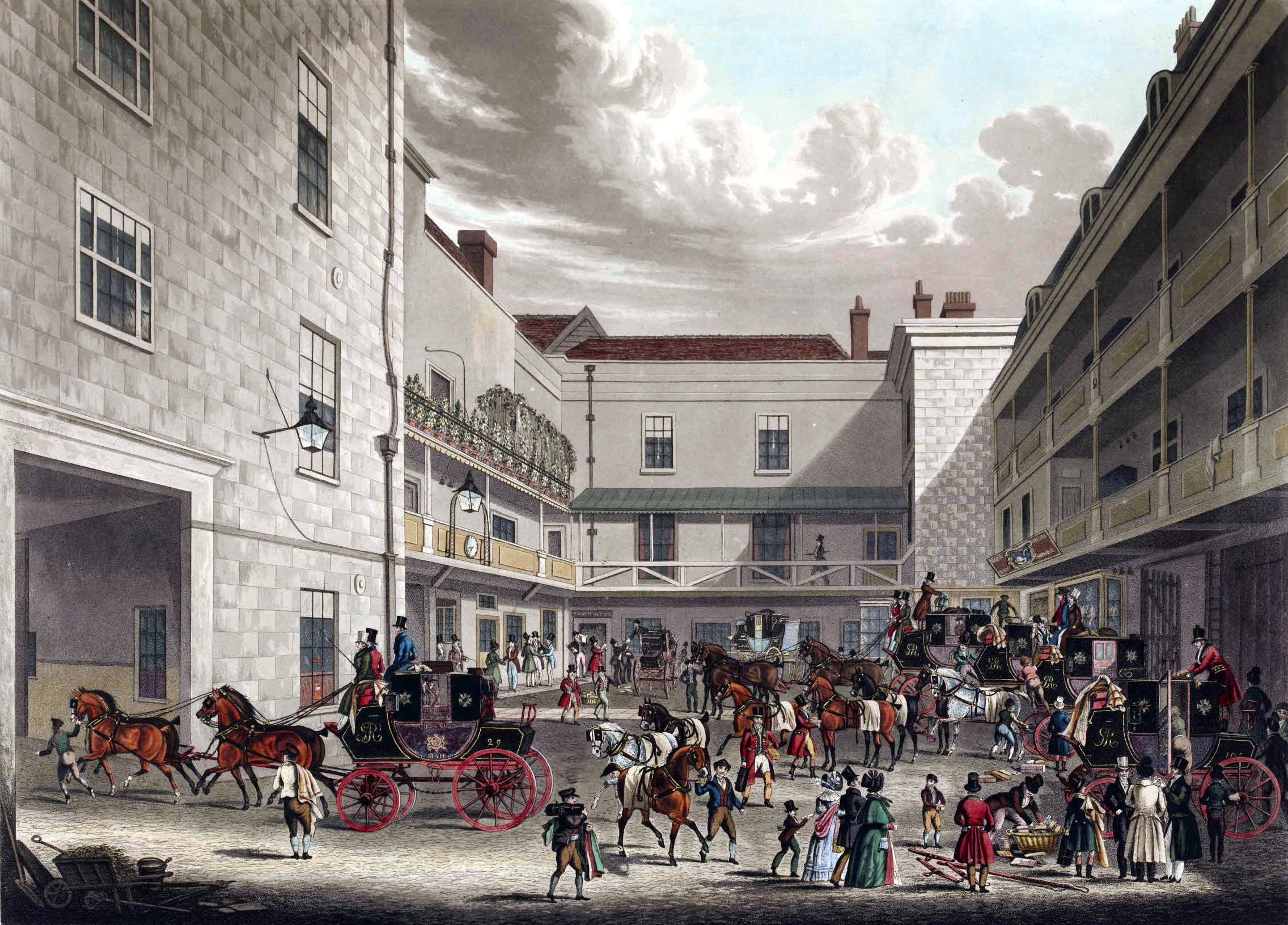
Yard of the Swan with Two Necks, Lad Lane, London, 1831

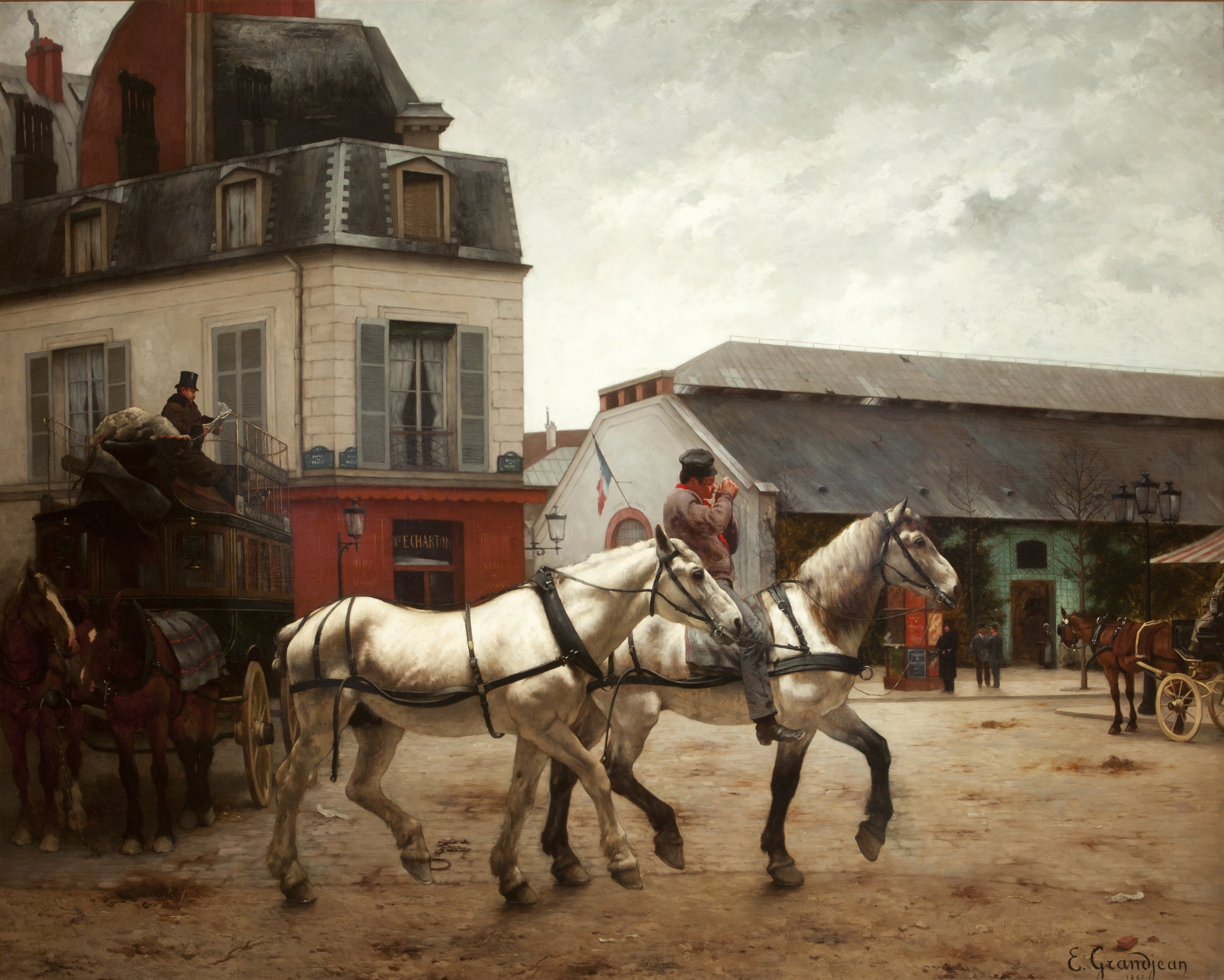
Spent coach-horses Place de Passy, Paris

A stage station, also known as a relay station, posting station or a staging post, is a facility along a main road or trade route where a traveller can rest or replace exhausted horses for fresh ones, since long journeys are much faster when using well fed and rested mounts. A stage is the space between the stops known as stations, posts, or relays.

Organised long-distance land travel became known as staging or posting. Stagecoaches, post chaises, private vehicles, individual riders and the like followed the already long-established system for messengers, couriers and letter-carriers.

Through metonymy the name stage also came to be used for a stagecoach alone.

== Posting and staging ==
=== Purpose ===
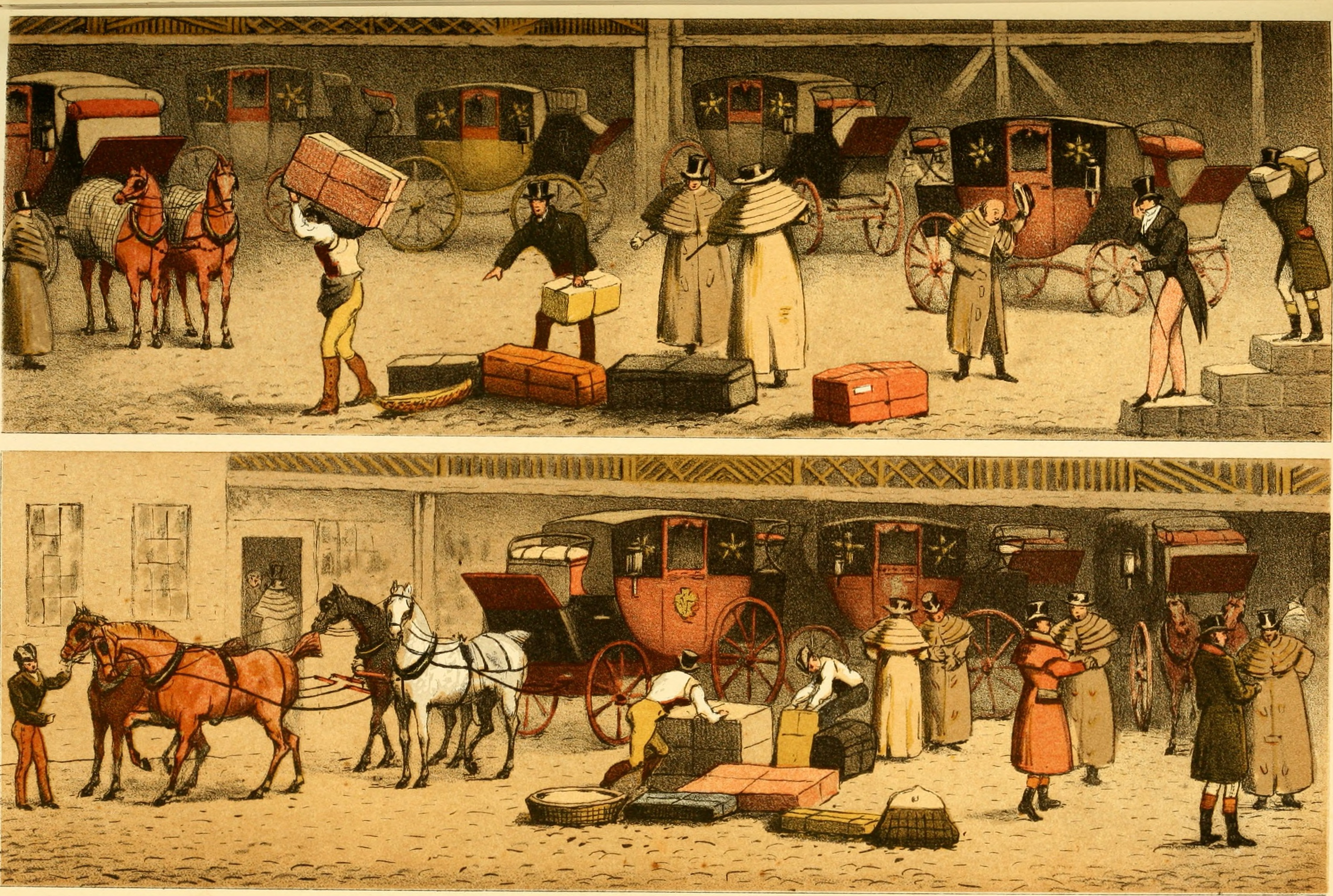
The Bull and Mouth's yard, St. Martin's Le Grand in 1838

Until well into the 19th century an overland traveller anxious to reach a destination as fast as possible depended on animals. Systems of arranging a supply of fresh horses to expedite travel along a particular route had been in use at least as far back as the ancient Romans when they were used by messengers and couriers or bearers of letters. Individually mounted riders are subject to their personal endurance limits. Posting could continue indefinitely with brief stops for fresh horses and crew. In addition to a carriage's obvious advantages (a degree of safety and shelter for the inside passengers and accessibility to non-riders) on long trips it tended to be the most rapid form of passenger travel.

=== Stagecoaches ===
In 18th century England, a posting-coach on good roads when regularly provided with fresh horses traveled as fast as 10 miles per hour (16 km/h). Post-horses, ridden by postilions (also called post-boys), were hired from a postmaster at a post house. At the next stage when new horses were harnessed, the post-boys were responsible for returning their horses to their starting post. Distances of each stage ranged from 8 to 20 miles apart. Common in England and continental Europe, posting declined once railways provided faster transport that was much more comfortable.

Posting remained popular in France and other European countries with less developed rail networks. Stagecoaches and mail coaches were known in continental Europe as diligences and postcoaches. Stage travel in the US averaged 60 to 70 miles (97 to 113 km) in a day.

=== Origin of the name posting ===
In a 1967 article in The Carriage Journal, published for the Carriage Association of America, Paul H. Downing recounts that the word post is derived from the Latin postis which in turn derives from the word which means to place an upright timber (a post) as a convenient place to attach a public notice. Postal and postage follow from this. Medieval couriers were caballari postarus or riders of the posts. The riders mounted fresh horses at each post on their route and then rode on. Post came to be applied to the riders then to the mail they carried and eventually to the whole system. In England regular posts were set up in the 16th century.

The riders of the posts carried the government’s letters. The local postmasters delivered the letters as well as providing horses to the royal couriers. They also provided horses to other travellers.

Each country has their own terms to suit their own systems of transporting mail and travellers. Some of the English-language terms which have been used include:

- Stagecoach station — a general term for stops where stagecoaches changed horses and passengers rested.
- Post house — a station for changing horses, often managed by the postal service.
- Relay station — where fresh horses (relays) were kept ready to replace tired ones.
- Inn or coaching inn (Britain) — provided lodging, meals, and horse services.
- Coach stop — used in casual speech, especially for passenger pickup/drop-off.
- Swing station (American West) — No passenger services, just quick horse swaps.
- Home station (American West) — More substantial, offering rest, meals, and repairs.

== Early routes ==
=== United States ===
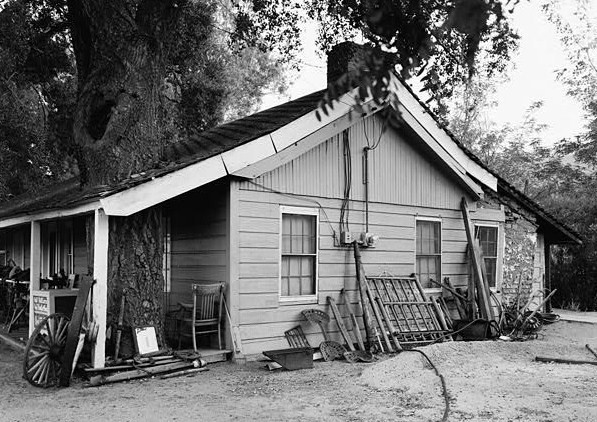
Butterfield stage station, Oak Grove, CA. built 1858, photographed 1960

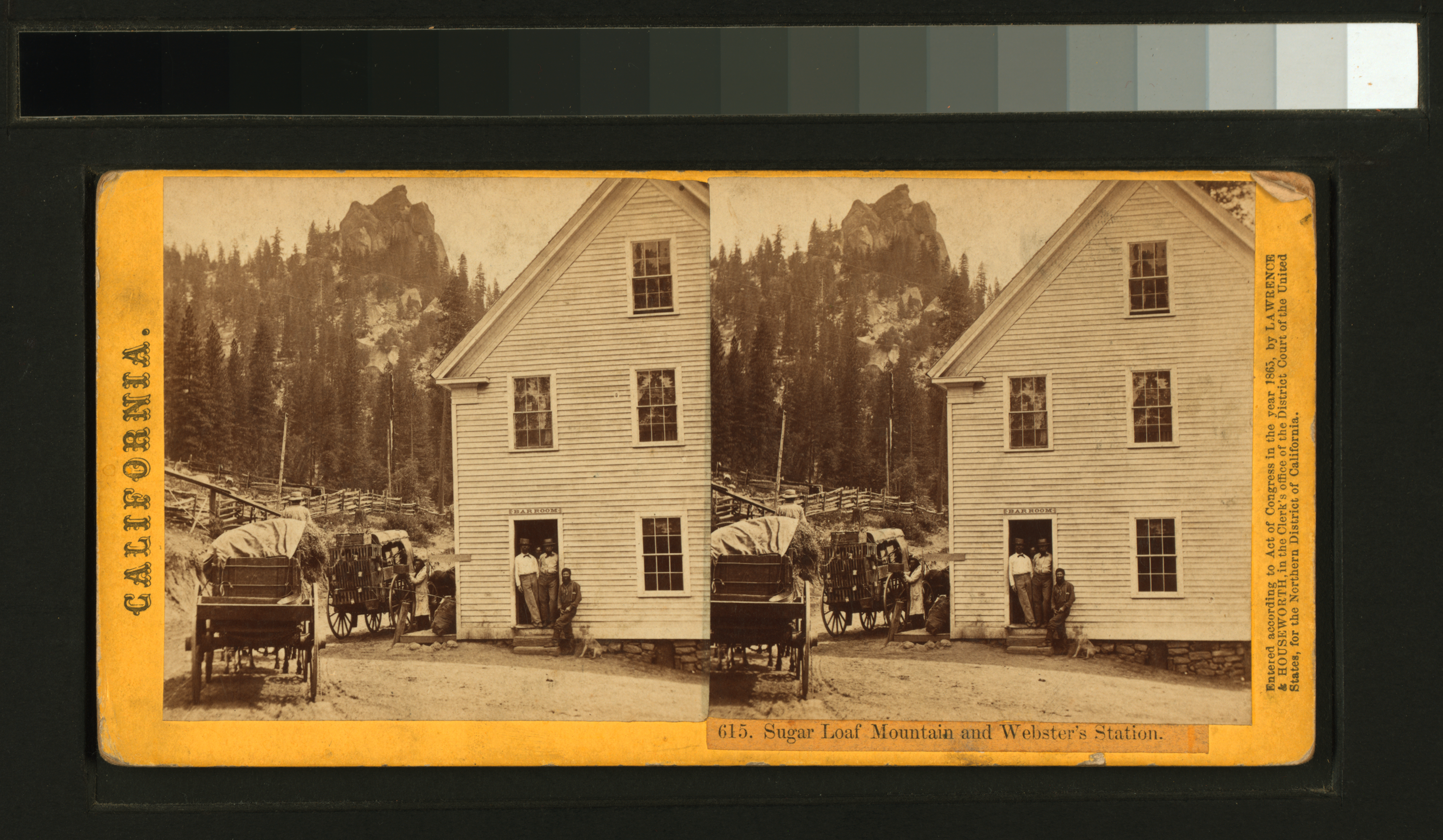
Bar room door, Webster's Station, Kyburz near Lake Tahoe

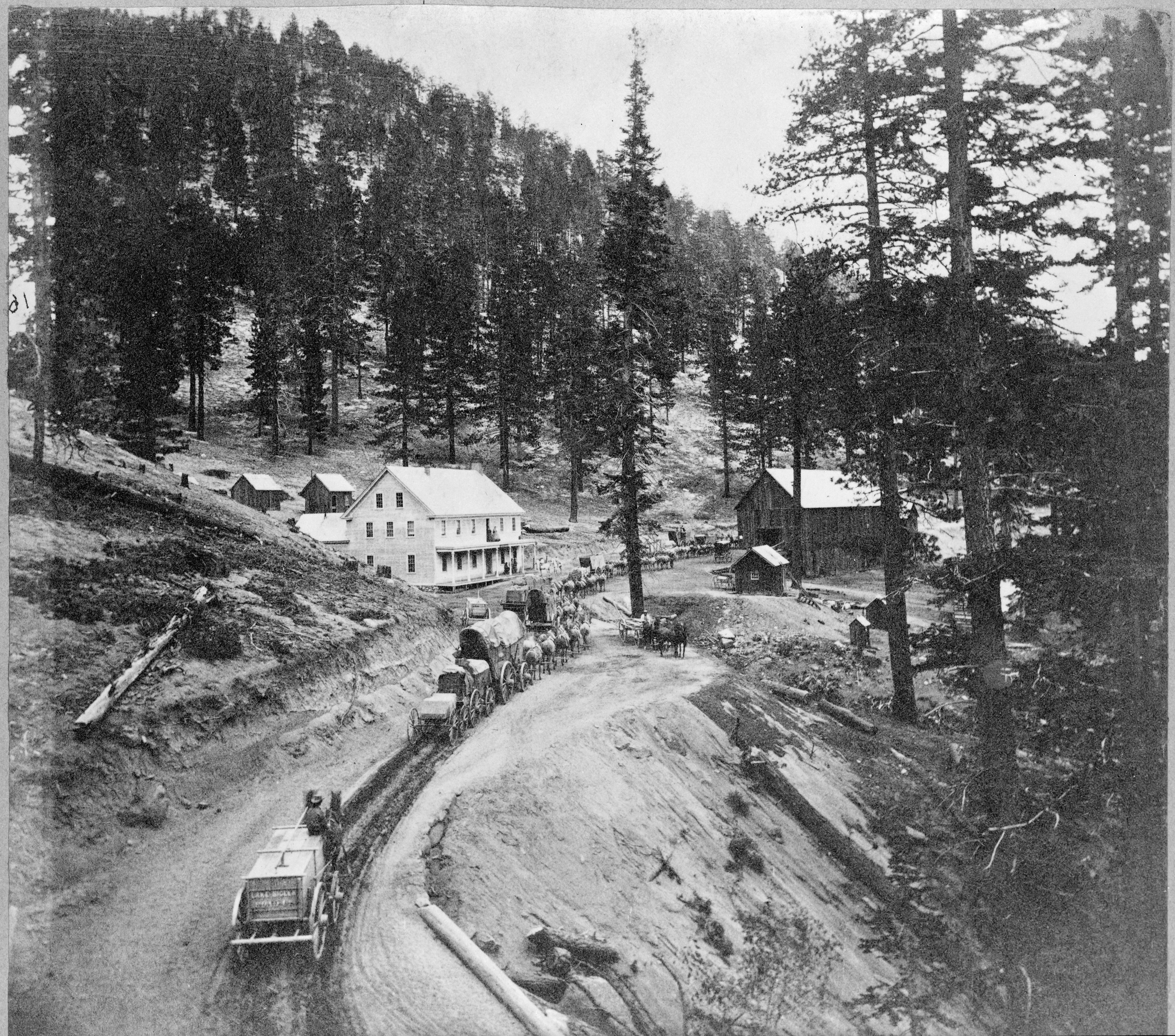
1866 Swift's Station, Carson and Lake Bigler Road

Beginning in the 18th century crude wagons began to be used to carry passengers between cities and towns, first within New England in 1744, then between New York and Philadelphia in 1756. Travel time was reduced on this later run from three days to two in 1766 with an improved coach called the Flying Machine. The first mail coaches appeared in the later 18th century carrying passengers and the mails, replacing the earlier post riders on the main roads. Coachmen carried letters, packages and money, often transacting business or delivering messages for their customers. By 1829 Boston was the hub of 77 stagecoach lines; by 1832 there were 106.

The Pioneer Stage Company ran four stages in 1864, daily and in each direction, between Sacramento and Virginia City — now the path of US Route 50.

Stops	Distances between stops in miles
Sacramento	0
Folsom (by railroad)	22
Latrobe (by railroad)	15
Placerville	16
Sportsman's Hall	11
River-Side Station	10
Webster's	9.5
Strawberry Valley	11
Yank's	11
Lake Bigler	9
Glenbrook	9
Carson	13.5
Virginia City	16

==== Home or swing station ====
A station master lived at a home station and travellers would be supplied with meals. A swing station only provided fresh horses.

=== England and Scotland ===
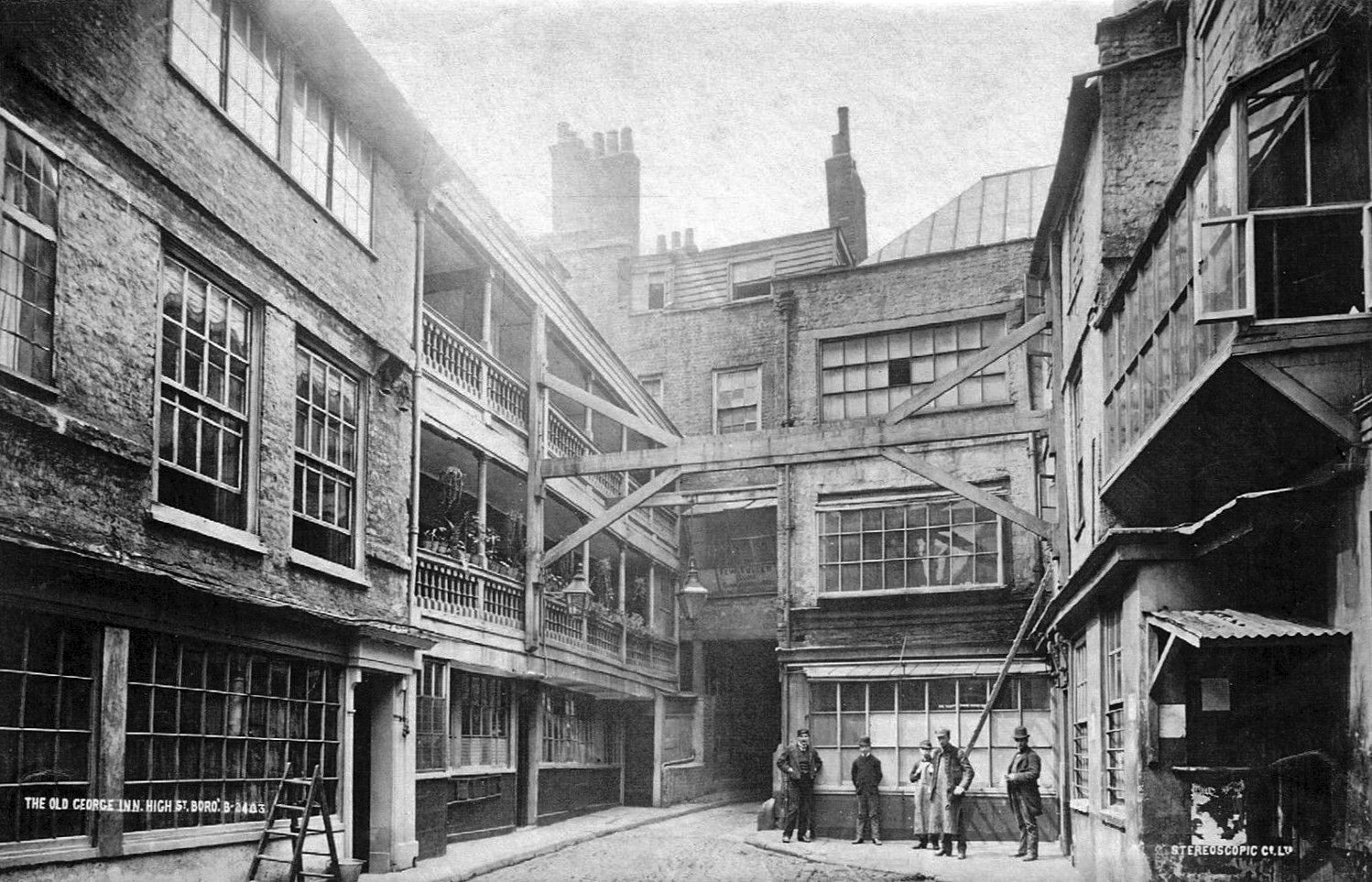
The empty yard of The George Inn, Southwark in 1889

The first route started in 1610 and ran from Edinburgh to Leith. By the mid 17th century, a basic infrastructure had been put in place. This was followed by a steady proliferation of other routes around the country.

By the mid 17th century a coach would depart every Monday and Thursday from London to Liverpool and, during the summer months, take about ten days to make the journey.

By the end of the 17th century, stage-coach routes ran up and down the three main roads in England. The London-York route was advertised in 1698:

Whoever is desirous of going between London and York or York and London, Let them Repair to the Black Swan in Holboorn, or the Black Swan in Coney Street, York, where they will be conveyed in a Stage Coach (If God permits), which starts every Thursday at Five in the morning.

==== Economic purposes ====
1. Stagecoaches carried small parcels like samples and patterns and bundles of bank notes.
2. They took over the business of carrying mail (proving as fast and reliable yet cheaper than couriers or mail carriers) and newspapers.
3. They took businessmen about their business which could now be conducted in person without agents.

==== Growth and early competition ====
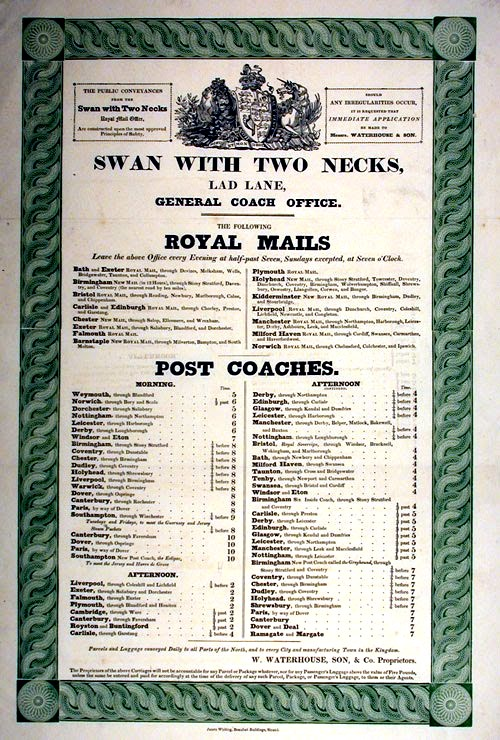
Timetable of coach departures. n.d.

At first travel by coach was regarded as effeminate for a man. The first public scheduled stagecoach service was in 1637 and long-distance coaches are believed to have begun in the 1650s. There were at least 420 stagecoach services to and from London each week in 1690, but only about a quarter of them took passengers beyond 40 miles (64 km) from London. Provincial routes developed in the following century, particularly in the 1770s. There was another burst of expansion from the mid 1820s until rail took the passengers.

During this time improving incomes allowed people to travel, there were more people and there was much more economic activity. Speeds improved from 4 or 5 mph (6.4 or 8.0 km/h) in the 1690s to 10 mph (16 km/h) in the 1830s. Part of this was due to greatly improved roading — see Turnpike trusts — and part to improved vehicles. Better suspension allowed coaches to travel faster and remain safe. Lighter, faster and better-bred horses were used as the road surfaces smoothed and heavy mud-slogging could be forgotten. By 1830, some journey times had fallen to as little as 20 per cent of the same route in 1790.

In the 18th and 19th centuries passenger transport was almost exclusively by road, though there were coastal passenger vessels and, later, passenger boats on canals. Still later, steam vessels and some canal boats could provide stagecoach speeds at much lower prices.

==== Ownership of posting stations ====
Innkeepers were involved from the start. Once they had attracted passengers they arranged partnerships with the others along their route and after deducting wages and hire of vehicles divided surplus takings according to the work done by their horses. An owner's financial success depended on finding the right horses and suitable feed for them at a good price. Profits could be high but well-capitalised competition could cut fares below cost. For financial stability ownership moved to a few major innkeepers. In London in the 1830s the three largest coach masters provided 80 per cent of the horses for the 342 services each week. Chaplin alone had 1,800 horses and 2,000 employees. Their coaches were built in Long Acre and maintained at Millbank.

==== Luxury market ====
The posting system provided horses for riding their routes (after about 1820 riding was no faster than a stagecoach) and for drawing private carriages and sometimes hired out post chaises, lighter and more comfortable closed carriages with a postilion riding one of the horses in place of a coachman. The cost of this private travel was at least twice that of travel by stagecoach but by the 1830s there were as many travelled by post or by hired two-wheeled gig (particularly commercial travellers) as by stagecoach.

==== Coaching inns ====
Strings of coaching inns provided passengers with overnight accommodation as well as fresh horses. William Shakespeare's first plays were performed at coaching inns such as The George Inn, Southwark.

The Angel and Royal in Grantham on the Great North Road — until 1866 known as The Angel — is believed to be England's oldest coaching inn. The façade of the main building as it appears today was built about 600 years ago. Its characteristic layout beyond the central coach entrance from the Market Square has a long enclosed rear courtyard, old stables and another entrance to the rear.

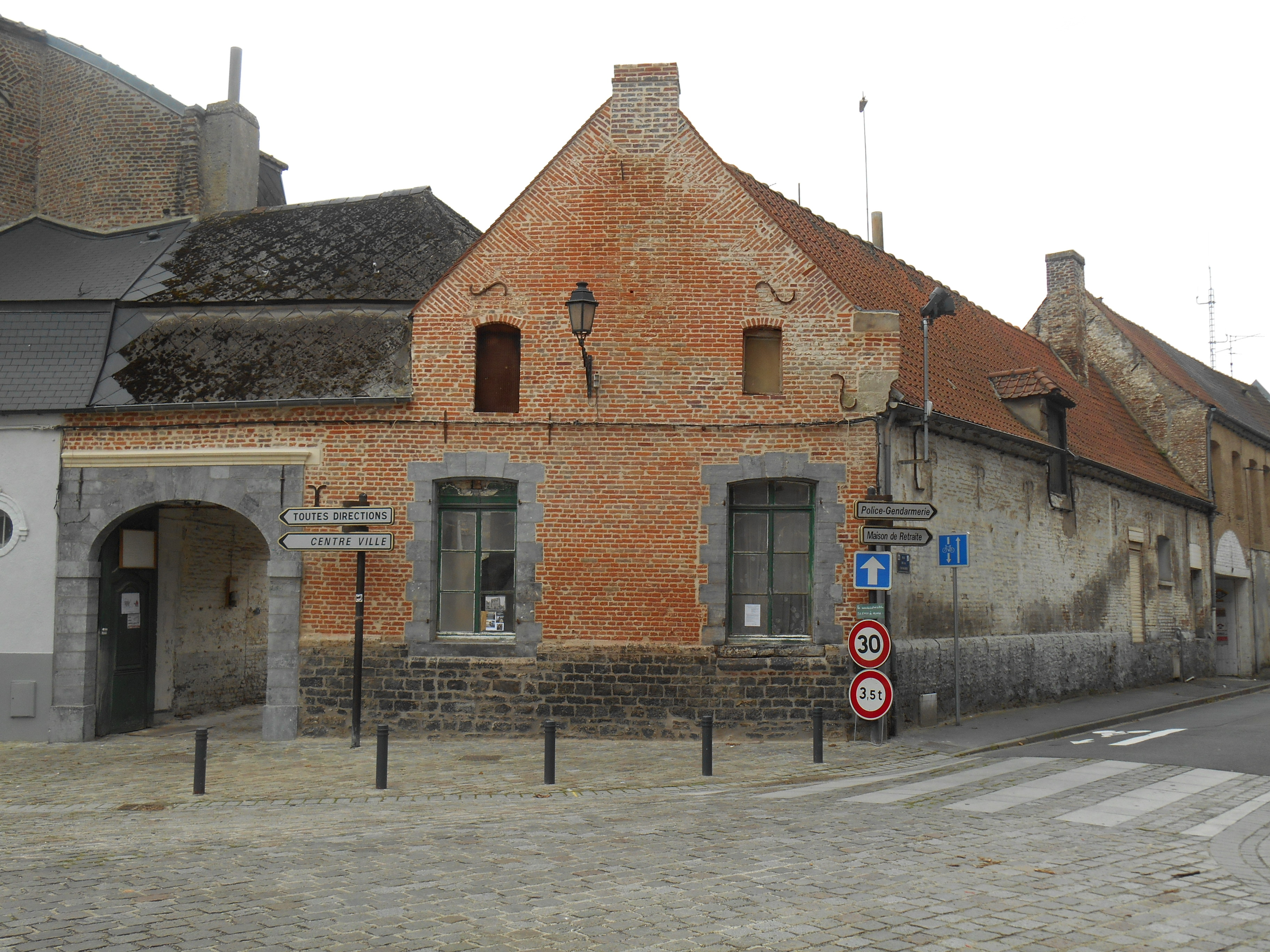
Old relay post, Condé-sur-l'Escaut, France

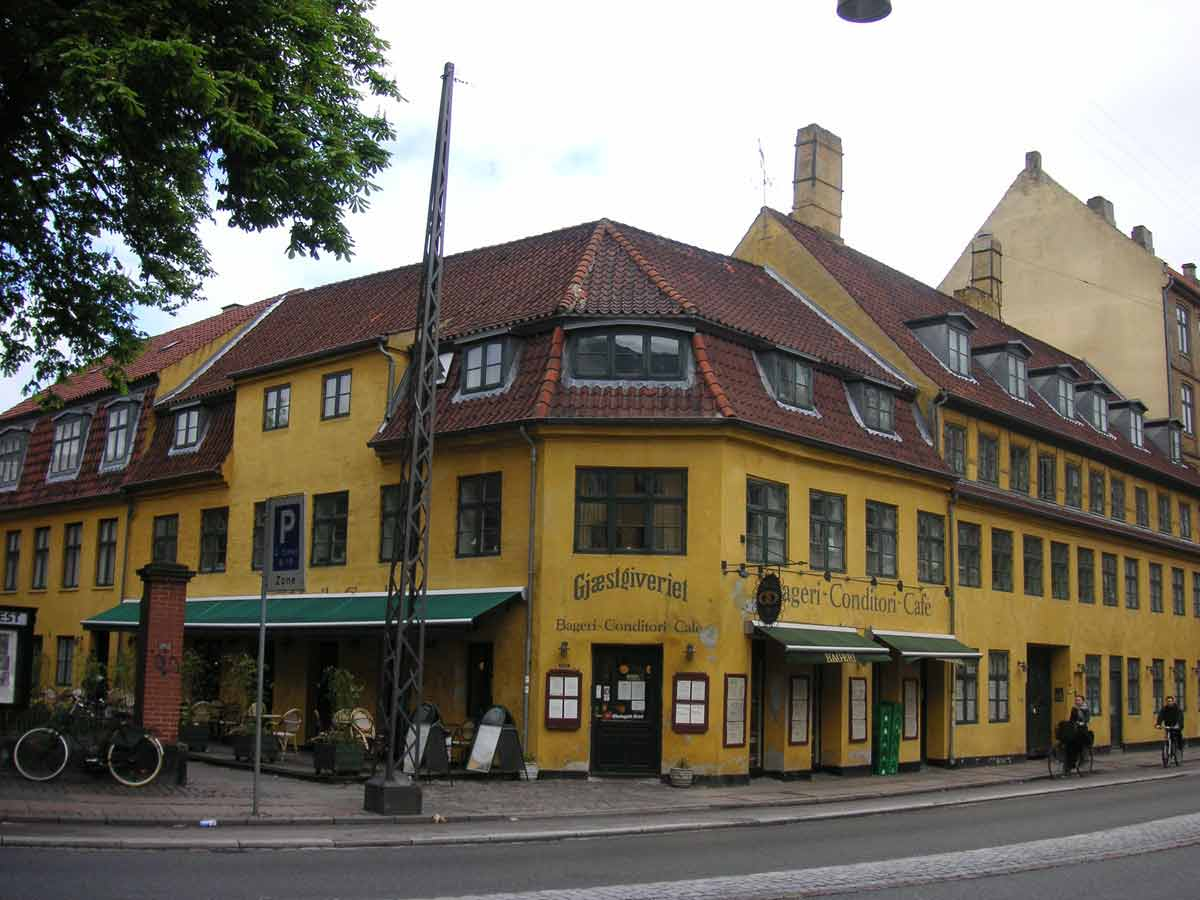
Black Horse relais de poste, Copenhagen

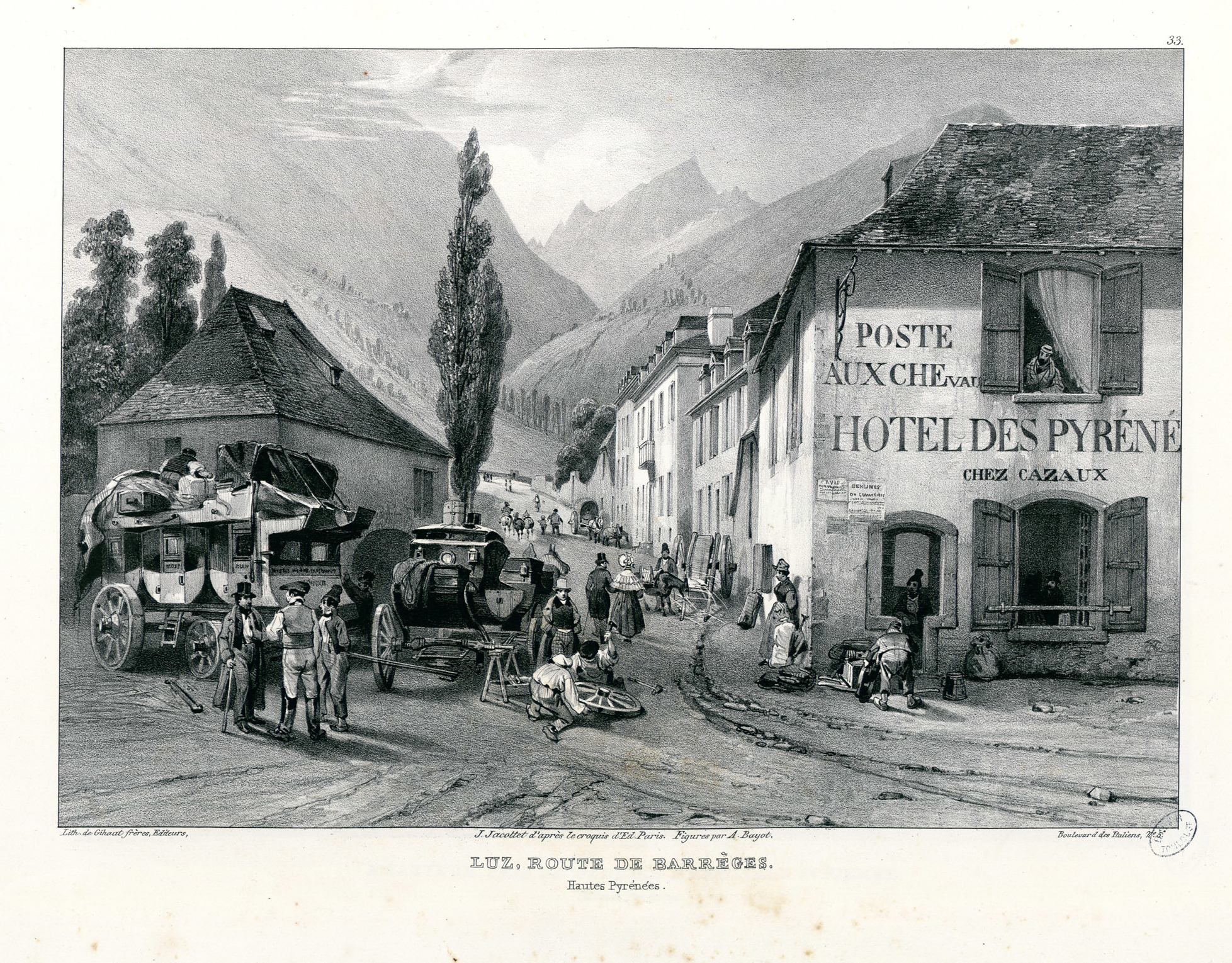
Replacing a wheel

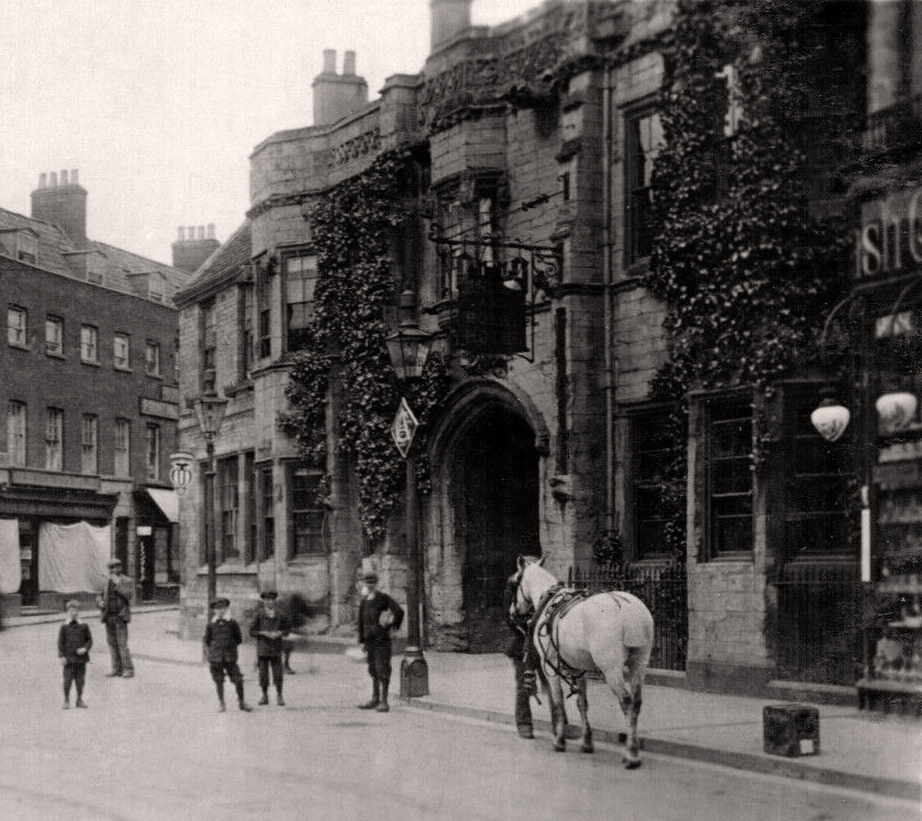
600 year-old facade of the Angel and Royal Inn showing its central entrance for coaches. c. 1900

== Napoleon's travel arrangements ==
The Duc de Rovigo gives the following account of Napoleon's arrangements for his journeys:—

"The establishment of saddle-horses was divided into brigades of nine horses each—two for the emperor, and seven for those whose duties attached them immediately to his person.

The establishment of carriage-horses was divided into relays; each relay being composed of three sets of horses.

Each brigade and each relay had also an escort attached to it. Suppose the emperor had to perform a journey of twenty leagues on horseback, six brigades would in general be stationed upon the road. ...

If the journey was to be performed in carriages, six relays were placed at the stations upon the road, in lieu of six brigades of saddle-horses. ...

The emperor's aides-de-camp were required to have a horse with each brigade when the journeys were performed on horseback; on other occasions they had places in the carriages.”

== See also ==
- Caravanserai – Type of roadside inn
- Shukuba – Post stations of Japan in the Edo period
- Yam (route) – Postal service system originating from the Mongol period
- Layover – Pause during scheduled transportation
- Fuelling station – Facility for dispensing coal or oil for vehicles and power plants
