= Farewell to St. Petersburg (film) =

- Directed by: Yan Frid
- Written by: Anatoly Grebnev
- Starring: Girt Yakovlev; Tatiana Bedova; Tatyana Piletskaya; Vasili Merkuryev; Pavel Kadochnikov
- Cinematography: Oleg Kukhovarenko
- Music by: Vladlen Chityakov
- Production company: Lenfilm
- Release date: 1971
- Running time: 98 minutes
- Country: Soviet Union
- Language: Russian

Farewell to St. Petersburg (Russian: Прощание с Петербургом, romanized: Proshchaniye s Peterburgom) is a 1972 Soviet biopic film directed by Yan Frid. The film is about the Austrian composer Johann Strauss's stay in Russia, his concerts in Pavlovsk in the summer of 1857, and his love towards the Russian aristocrat Olga Smirnitskiy, to whom he dedicated several works.

== Cast ==
- Girt Yakovlev - Johann Strauss (voiced by Aleksandr Demyanenko)
- Tatyana Bedova - Olga Smirnitskaya, Russian aristocrat
- Tatyana Piletskaya - Natalia G. Smirnitskaya
- Vasili Merkuryev - Leybrok
- Pavel Kadochnikov - Pavel Maksimov
- Igor Dmitriev - Grand Duke
- Sergey Karnovich-Valois - manager
- Yelena Anderegg as Olga Nikolayevna (as Ye. Anderegg)
- Viktoriya Gorshenina
- Pavel Kashlakov as Nechayev

== Awards ==
Director Yan Frid received honorary diplomas at the Film Festival of Workers in Czechoslovakia (1973).
