= Aleksey Zhivotov =

Russian composer

Aleksey Semyonovich Zhivotov (Russian: Алексей Семенович Животов, 1 November or 14 November 1904 – 27 August 1964) was a Russian composer, who was born in Kazan and died in Leningrad. He studied at the Leningrad Conservatory with Vladimir Shcherbachyov. He was a committee member of the Leningrad Composers' Union. His best-known works are his song cycles.

He lived to the age of 59, and there is very little on his life via primary sources, biographical information, or other records. He was buried in Leningrad's Serafimovskoe Cemetery.

== Works ==
- Sketches for Nonet (1929)
- Suite for a large orchestra (1928)
- "West" symphonic cycle (1932)
- Festive Overture
- Heroic March
- Theatrical Suite
- Dance Suite

== Filmography ==
- 1932 - Glory of the World
- 1937 - For the Soviet Motherland
- 1955 - Twelfth Night
