= Margarita Terekhova =

Soviet and Russian actress

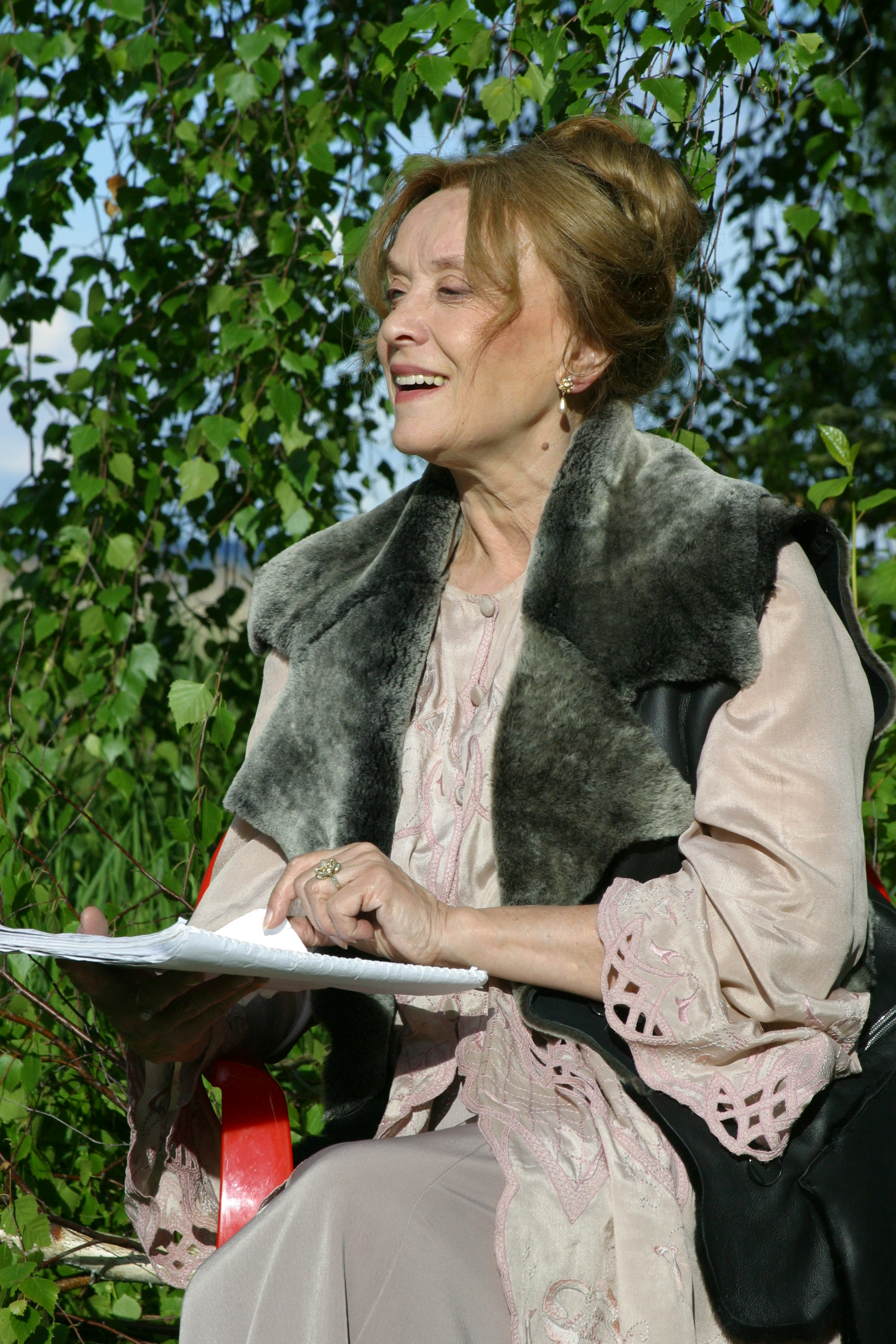
- Margarita Terekhova in 2003
- Born: Margarita Borisovna Terekhova; August 25, 1942 (age 84); Turinsk, Sverdlovsk Oblast, Russian SFSR, Soviet Union
- Occupation: Actress
- Years active: 1964-2005
- Children: 2

Margarita Borisovna Terekhova (Russian: Маргари́та Бори́совна Те́рехова; born August 25, 1942, in Turinsk, Sverdlovsk Oblast, Russian SFSR) is a Soviet and Russian film and theatre actress. She was awarded the title People's Artist of Russia in 1996.

== Biography ==
Margarita Terekhova was born on August 25, 1942, in the town of Turinsk, Sverdlovsk Oblast. In school, Margarita was interested in sport and was a basketball captain. She finished school with a gold medal.

From 1959 she studied at the physics and mathematics faculty at the Tashkent State University from 1959 until 1961. After that she went to Moscow and tried to get into VGIK but her application was declined. After that she enrolled to study at the school-studio of Yuri Zavadsky at the Mossovet Theatre.

After her graduation in 1964 she worked for many years as an actress of the Mossovet Theatre. From 1983 to 1987 she acted in the theatre group "The Puppet Show" organized by her and Igor Talkov.

Terekhova's acting debut was in 1965 in the film Hello, That's Me!. Margarita became particularly popular in the late 1970s, after the release of a costumed musical TV films The Dog in the Manger and D'Artagnan and Three Musketeers. At first she played the capricious Countess Diana de Belflor, in the second - the treacherous Milady. Leading roles followed in films made by directors including Andrei Smirnov and Ilya Averbakh (Monologue, 1972) as well as the dual-role in Andrei Tarkovsky's acclaimed Mirror (1975). And more international co-productions came after, including George Cukor's The Blue Bird (1976) and Konrad Wolf's Mama, I'm Alive (1977). Terekhova's subsequent work in film proved her high level of acting expertise but did not attain the success as her earlier work.

Margarita Terekhova worked and was friends with Igor Talkov. They had a close relationship and worked for some time together at the musical theatre collective "Balaganchik".

In 2005 she made her debut as a director, shooting the film The Seagull based on the work of Anton Chekhov. Since then, Terekhova has retired from acting and almost never gives interviews due to her struggle with Alzheimer's disease. She rarely appears in public and hardly ever attends public events.

== Family ==
- Father - Boris Terekhov - actor of the Sverdlovsk Theater.
- Mother - actress Galina Stanislavovna Tomasevic.
- Her first husband (1964-1967) - Vyacheslav Butenko, actor, Honored Artist of Russia.
- Second husband (1967-1969) - Savva Kirillovich Hashimov (March 5, 1940 - January 11, 2012), Bulgarian actor. They met on the set of Running on Waves.
- Third husband (1980-1995) - Georgiy Yurievich Gavrilov (born 1958), director.
- Daughter - actress Anna Terekhova (born 1967 or 1970), grandson Mikhail Dobrynin (born in 1988), from second husband Savva Hashimov.
- Son - actor, photographer, artist Alexander Terekhov (born July 12, 1981). His father is Georgiy Gavrilov.
- Daughter-in-law - Tatiana Naynik, daughter Vera Terekhova (b. 2015).

== Awards ==
- Honored Artist of the RSFSR (1976)
- Grand Prix of the International Film Festival of Auteur Pictures in San Remo, Italy (1991, for participation in the film "For Crazies Only")
- Prize of the International Film Festival Nordic in Rouen, France (1992, for participation in the film "For Crazies Only")
- International Film Festival prize in Bruges, Belgium (1993, for participation in the film "For Crazies Only")
- People's Artist of Russia (1996)
- Honorary Diploma and a prize (for her contribution to cinema) Tenth Moscow Festival of National Cinema "Moscow Premiere" (2012)
- Order of Honour (2013)

== Stage Roles and filmography ==
=== Theatre ===
==== Mossovet Theatre ====
- Cleopatra in the play Caesar and Cleopatra by Bernard Shaw (1964);
- Gertrude in the play Hamlet by William Shakespeare
- Marie in the play The Clown based on the novel by Heinrich Böll (1968);
- Sonya in the play Crime and Punishment based on the novel by Fyodor Dostoyevsky (1971);
- Elizabeth in "Royal Hunt" based on the play by Leonid Zorin (1977);
- Lybov Sergeevna in "Theme with Variations" by Samuel Aleshin (1979).

=== Selected filmography ===
- 1966 Hello, That's Me! as Tanya
- 1970 Belorussian station as Natasha Shipilova, Sasha's girlfriend
- 1972 Monologue as Tasya, Sretensky's daughter
- 1975 For the Rest of His Life as Faina and one-legged pregnant woman
- 1975 Mirror as the young Natalya/the mother
- 1976 The Blue Bird as Milk
- 1976 Trust as Aleksandra Kollontai
- 1977 Mama, I'm Alive as Svetlana
- 1978 The Dog in the Manger as countess Diana de Belflor
- 1978 D'Artagnan and Three Musketeers as Milady de Winter
- 1989 It as Anelka Lydohovskaya
- 1990 Ainult hulludele ehk halastajaõde as Rita
