= The Dog in the Manger =

Metaphor about spitefulness

The fable in a 1912 collection of Aesop's Fables

The story and metaphor of The Dog in the Manger derives from an old Greek fable which has been transmitted in several different versions. Interpreted variously over the centuries, the metaphor is now used to speak of one who spitefully prevents others from having something for which one has no use. Although the story was ascribed to Aesop's Fables in the 15th century, there is no ancient source that does so.

== Greek origin ==
The short form of the fable as cited by Laura Gibbs is: "There was a dog lying in a manger who did not eat the grain, but who nevertheless prevented the horse from being able to eat anything either."

The story was first glossed in the 1st century CE lexicon of Diogenianus as "The dog in the manger, concerning those who neither themselves use nor allow others to use: Insofar as the dog neither itself eats the barleycorns, nor allows the horse to". It was twice used in the following century by Greek writer Lucian: in "Remarks addressed to an illiterate book-fancier" and in his play "Timon the Misanthrope". One other contemporary poetic source is a paederastic epigram by Straton of Sardis in the Greek Anthology.

At roughly the same time, an alternative version of the fable was alluded to in Saying 102 of the apocryphal Gospel of Thomas. This example involves oxen rather than a horse: "Jesus said, 'Woe to the Pharisees, for they are like a dog sleeping in the manger of oxen, for neither does he eat nor does he let the oxen eat'." The saying seems to be similar to his criticism of the Pharisees in the canonical Gospel of Matthew (23.13): "Woe to you, teachers of the law and Pharisees, you hypocrites! You shut the kingdom of heaven in men's faces; you do not enter yourselves, nor will you let others enter."

== Later use in Europe ==
Illustration of the fable by Wenceslaus Hollar (1666)

The fable does not appear in any of the traditional collections of Aesop's Fables and is not attributed to him until Heinrich Steinhowel's Esopus (c. 1476). There it is titled "Of the envious dog" (de cane invido) and illustrates a moral proposition: "People frequently begrudge something to others that they themselves cannot enjoy. Even though it does them no good, they won't let others have it." After the cattle that it hinders from eating remonstrate with it, Steinhöwel goes on to mention that "The same thing happened when a dog was holding a bone in his mouth: the dog couldn't chew on the bone that way, but no other dog was able to chew on it either."

There were, however, earlier 14th century poetic references to the fable. In John Gower's Confessio Amantis (c. 1390) it is related:

Though it be not the hound's habit
To eat chaff, yet will he warn off
An ox that commeth to the barn
Thereof to take up any food.

Though the next reference in English is in John Lydgate's The Pilgrimage of the Life of Man (1426), where it is applied to a personification of miserliness, the work was written almost a century before in French by Guillaume de Deguileville (1335).

While a horse figures in some allusions by later writers, the ox is the preferred beast in Renaissance emblem books. It appears as such in a Latin poem by Hieronymus Osius (1564), although the accompanying illustration shows both an ox and an ass and the dog there, as in Steinhöwel, carries a bone clenched between its teeth. Oxen appear also in the Latin prose version of Arnold Freitag (1579) and in the English poem by Geoffrey Whitney (1586). Most of these authors follow Steinhöwel in interpreting the fable as an example of envy, but Christoph Murer's emblem of 1622 is titled meanness (Kargheit) and the accompanying verse explains that such behaviour is miserly, not using what one has for oneself nor for the relief of others in need.

Later on the dog's behaviour is reinterpreted as malicious, a reading made clear in Roger L'Estrange's pithy version: "A churlish envious Cur was gotten into a manger, and there lay growling and snarling to keep the Provender. The Dog eat none himself, and yet rather ventur'd the starving his own Carcase than he would suffer any Thing to be the better for't. THE MORAL. Envy pretends to no other Happiness than what it derives from the Misery of other People, and will rather eat nothing itself than not to starve those that would." Samuel Croxall echoes L'Estrange's observation in Fables of Aesop and Others (1722). "The stronger the passion is, the greater torment he endures; and subjects himself to a continual real pain, by only wishing ill to others." It is with this understanding that the idiom of "a dog in a manger" is most often used currently. However, a recent study has noted that it seems to be falling out of use, in America at least, concluding that "the majority of [respondents] do not know it or even recall ever having heard it".

== Sexual interpretation ==
One of Lucian's allusions to the fable gives it a metaphorically sexual slant: "You used to say that they acted absurdly in that they loved you to excess, yet did not dare to enjoy you when they might, and instead of giving free rein to their passion when it lay in their power to do so, they kept watch and ward, looking fixedly at the seal and the bolt; for they thought it enjoyment enough, not that they were able to enjoy you themselves, but that they were shutting out everyone else from a share in the enjoyment, like the dog in the manger that neither ate the barley herself nor permitted the hungry horse to eat it." (Timon the Misanthrope)

In the 1687 Francis Barlow edition of the fables, Aphra Behn similarly sums up the sexual politics of the idiom: "Thus aged lovers with young beautys live, Keepe off the joys they want the power to give." It was of exactly such a situation involving a eunuch and his slaveboys that Straton had complained in the Greek anthology. But the idiom was also applied to occasions of heterosexual jealousy between equals, as for example in Emily Brontë's Wuthering Heights, where it arises during an argument between Catherine Linton and Isabella Linton over Isabella's love for Heathcliff.

A Spanish story involving sexual jealousy and selfishness appears in Lope de Vega's play El Perro del Hortelano (English: The Gardener's Dog; 1618). In this case, De Vega's title alludes to the parallel European idiom involving a variant story in which a gardener sets his dog to guard his cabbages (or lettuces). After the gardener's death the dog continues to forbid people access to the beds, giving rise to the simile "He's like the gardener's dog that eats no cabbage and won't let others either" or, for short, "playing the gardener's dog" (faire le chien du jardinier). In the Martinique Creole there is also the similar-sounding proverb, "The dog doesn't like the banana and he doesn't want the hen to eat it."

== Artistic use ==
Political cartoon showing William Jennings Bryan as the dog in the manger (1902)

Popular artistic allusions to the fable, or the idiom arising from it, were especially common during the 19th century. Where Lope de Vega had adapted the theme to a problem play in the 17th century, the Belgian composer Albert Grisar used it as the basis for his one-act comic opera of 1855, Le chien du jardinier. The idiom was also taken up in the US by the successful writer of farces, Charles H. Hoyt, where a horse rather than the more common ox figured on the 1899 poster (see left). The title has also been used in various media since then, but without reference to the fable in publicity or on covers.

Several well-known artists had illustrated fable collections and their designs were recycled for various purposes. Among these may be mentioned Wenceslaus Hollar's print for the 1666 Ogilby edition of Aesop's fables, in which a dog occupies the manger and barks at a single ox being driven into a wooden barn. Shortly afterwards, Francis Barlow pictured the dog snarling on a pile of hay in a brick-built barn, while the dog does so in a more open farmyard structure in Samuel Howitt's A New Work of Animals (1810). Hollar's design of the ox turning its head to look round at the dog with the barn's brick entrance behind was clearly an influence on later illustrators, including those for the various editions of Samuel Croxall's fable collection and for Thomas Bewick's of 1818.

Such illustrations were influential too on those who created designs for crockery. That on a Spode serving dish from 1831 is also related to the Barlow design, although the action takes place outside the barn. A Staffordshire nursery dish of 1835, however, has more in common with Howitt's design. The fable also figured on the popular alphabet plates from Brownhills Pottery later in the 19th century, although in this case only the ox's head is featured as it gazes at the dog reared up and barking.

In Britain artistic preference was for the anecdotal and the sentimental among 19th century genre artists, who found the fable ideal for their purposes. The most successful, and typical of many others, was Walter Hunt (1861–1941), whose "Dog in the Manger" (1885) was bought by the Chantrey Bequest and is now in Tate Britain. At least two versions exist of the work. In one two calves peer at a Jack Russell puppy that sits looking back in the hay that they want to eat. In the Tate version, a different breed is curled up asleep in their manger.

The idiom was also put to figurative use during the 19th century. In much the same anecdotal tradition, the print-maker Thomas Lord Busby (1782–1838) used the title to show a dyspeptic man eyeing askance a huge dinner, while hungry beggars and an importunate dog look on, in a work from 1826. Later on Charles H. Bennett revisited the scene in his The Fables of Aesop and Others Translated into Human Nature (1857), where a dog dressed as a footman and carrying food to his master bares his teeth at the poor ox begging at the door. In this case the fable was rewritten to fit the scenario.

Such work, bordering on the cartoon, provided a profitable avenue for social commentary. An American example appeared in the illustration to a children's book of 1880, where a dog dressed as a ruffian stands on the straw, cudgel in hand, warning off a cow and her calf (see above). It ushers in use of the theme in illustrated papers a little later. J. S. Pughe's centrefold in Puck pictures a dog in the uniform of a U.S. Marine holding off European nations that wish to participate in the Nicaragua Canal scheme. It was followed by the cover cartoon of Harper's Weekly picturing William Jennings Bryan as the dog, obstructing the choice of the Democratic presidential candidacy and preventing others getting at the White House oats.
