= The Dog in the Manger (1978 film) =

1978 film by Yan Frid

- Written by: Yan Frid
- Directed by: Yan Frid
- Starring: Margarita Terekhova; Mikhail Boyarsky; Igor Dmitriev
- Music by: Gennady Gladkov
- Country of origin: Soviet Union
- Original language: Russian

Production
- Cinematography: Evgeniy Shapiro
- Running time: 129 minutes
- Production company: Lenfilm

Original release
- Release: 1978

The Dog in the Manger (Russian: Собака на сене, romanized: Sobaka na sene) is a 1978 Soviet musical-comedy film directed by Yan Frid based on the eponymous 1618 play by Lope de Vega.

== Plot ==
Teodoro, secretary of the Countess Diana de Belflère, is in love with the maid Marcella. The lady suddenly feels jealousy awakening in her as she watches their romance develop. But conventions and burden of prejudice have strong power over the independent and self-willed Diana. She, who teases her noble fiancées, can not go so low as to confess her love to an uncultivated servant. Teodoro has no choice - he has to leave Diana's house and go to seek happiness in some other place although the souls of lovers belong to each other. Then his servant Tristan, a wily and witty scoundrel comes to the rescue. And Teodoro suddenly turns out to be an aristocratic nobleman, in no way inferior in his ancestry and wealth to Diana.

== Cast ==
- Margarita Terekhova - Diana, Countess de Belfleur (vocals: Elena Driatskaya)
- Mikhail Boyarsky - Teodoro
- Igor Dmitriev - Count Federico (vocals: Mikhail Boyarsky)
- Nikolai Karachentsov - Marquis of Ricardo, Diana's suitor
- Ernst Romanov - Count Ludovico, father of Teodoro
- Elena Proklova - Marcela, Diane's maid and former beloved of Teodoro (vocals: Elena Driatskaya)
- Armen Dzhigarkhanyan - Tristan, lackey and friend of Teodoro (voiced by Igor Efimov, Mikhail Boyarsky sang the couplets of drinking companions)
- Victor Ilichev - Fabio, servant of Diana
- Zinaida Sharko - Anard, Diana's maid and girlfriend
- Gelena Ivlieva - Dorotea, Diana's maid and girlfriend of Marcela
- Fyodor Nikitin - Ottavo, Diana's majordomo (voiced by Aleksandr Demyanenko)

== Production ==
Initially, Oleg Yankovsky and Oleg Dahl auditioned for the role of Teodoro, and Mikhail Boyarsky was to play the role of the Marquis of Ricardo, which eventually was played Nikolai Karachentsov.

The film was shot in Livadia Palace, its gardens and in Lenfilm pavilions.
