= Pionerskaya Pravda =

Soviet and Russian newspaper for children

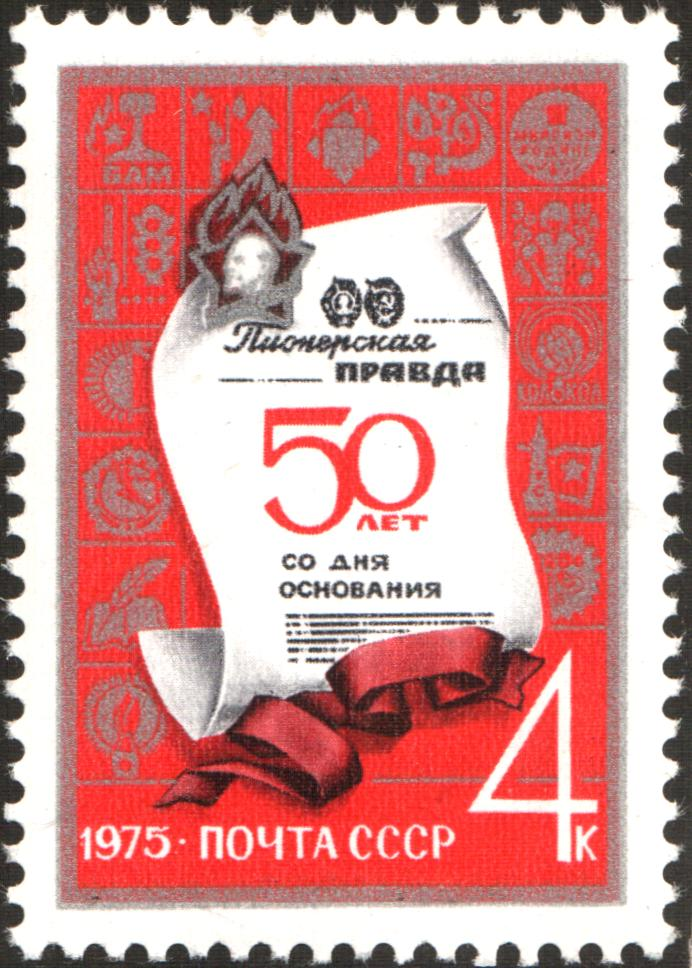
USSR stamp: Masthead of "Pionerskaya Pravda" and Pioneer Badge. Series: 50th Anniversary of the Newspaper "Pionerskaya Pravda"

Pionerskaya Pravda (Пионе́рская пра́вда) is an all-Russian newspaper. Initially it was an all-Union newspaper of the Soviet Union. Its name may be translated as "Truth for Young Pioneers".

== History ==
The newspaper was founded March 6, 1925 in Moscow and published under the name School Pravda and later under Pioneer Truth. Nikolai Bukharin was the first editor of the newspaper. Different poets and artists, like Mikhail Zoshchenko, Ilya Ilf, Evgeny Petrov and Vladimir Mayakovsky, cooperated with the newspaper. On March 6, 1927, the newspaper became part of the Central and Moscow Committees of the All-Union Young Communist League. From 1958, it formed part of the Central Committee of the All-Union Young Communist League and the Central Council of the All-Union Pioneers' Organization. From February 4, 1928, a newspaper was published twice a week, and since October 3, 1928 it has been published three times a week.

The newspaper became a weekly printed body of the Moscow RKSM Committee. In the 1970s and 1980s its circulation approached 10,000,000 (almost every child in the Soviet Union had a subscription). Its title followed the name of the main Soviet newspaper of the time, Pravda, as did multiple other newspapers. In 1991, following the collapse of the USSR, the newspaper was reorganized and became a national newspaper for children and adolescents.

The newspaper continues to exist, but now it is not associated with Young Pioneers, and the circulation is greatly reduced.

== Chief editors ==
- М. Stremyakov (1925–1926)
- В. Lyadova (1927–1930)
- Н. Lyalin (1931)
- Г. Soldiers (1932–1933)
- А. Stroyev (1933)
- А. Gusev (1934–1935)
- А. Stroyev (1935–1938)
- Н. Danilov (1938–1940)
- И. Andreev (1940–1945)
- В. Gubarev (1945–1947)
- В. Semyonov (1947–1949)
- З. Tumanova (1949–1952)
- С. Potemkin (1952–1953)
- Т. Matveeva (1953–1961)
- Н. Chernova (1961–1982)
- О. I. Grekova (1983–2006)
- М. Barannikov (since 2006)

== Awards and recognitions ==
In 1995 Pionerskaya Pravda was awarded the Red Banner of Labor, in 1950 the Order of Lenin and in 1985 the Order of Friendship of Peoples.

== Other Pioneer newspapers ==
Similar newspapers were published in other languages of the USSR: as of 1974, six newspapers in Russian and 22 in other languages.

Republic	Title	Translation	City	Language	Founded
USSR	Пионерская правда	Pioneer's Truth	Moscow	Russian	1925
Russian SFSR	Ленинские искры	Lenin's Sparks	Leningrad	Russian	1924
Baskhir ASSR	Башҡортостан пионере	Pioneer of Bashkria	Ufa	Bashkir	1930
Chuvash ASSR	Пионер сасси	Pioneer's call	Cheboksary	Chuvash	1930
Mari ASSR	Ямде лий	Be ready	Yoshkar-Ola	Mari	1933
Tatar ASSR	Яшь ленинчы	Young Leninist	Kazan	Tatar	1924
Udmurt ASSR	Дась лу	Be ready	Izhevsk	Udmurt	1930
Yakut ASSR	Бэлэм буол	Be ready	Yakutsk	Yakut	1936
Ukrainian SSR	Зірка	Little Star	Kiev	Ukrainian	1925
Ukrainian SSR	Юный ленинец	Young Leninist	Kiev	Russian	1922
Byelorussian SSR	Піянер Беларусі	Pioneer of Belarus	Minsk	Belarusian	1929
Byelorussian SSR	Зорька	Dawn	Minsk	Russian	1945
Uzbek SSR	Ленин учқуни	Lenin's Spark	Tashkent	Uzbek	1929
Uzbek SSR	Пионер Востока	Pioneer of the East	Tashkent	Russian	1927
Karakalpak ASSR	Жеткиншек	Change	Nukus	Karakalpak	1932
Kazakh SSR	Қазақстан пионерi	Pioneer of Kazakhstan	Almaty	Kazakh	1930
Kazakh SSR	Дружные ребята	Friendly children	Almaty	Russian	1933
Georgian SSR	ნორჩ ლენინელი	Young Leninist	Tbilisi	Georgian	1931
Azerbaijani SSR	Азәрбајҹан пионери	Pioneer of Azerbaijan	Baku	Azerbaijani	1938
Lithuanian SSR	Lietuvos pionierius	Pioneer of Lithuania	Vilnius	Lithuanian	1946
Moldavian SSR	Тынэрул ленинист	Young Leninist	Chișinău	Moldavian	1941
Moldavian SSR	Юный ленинец	Young Leninist	Chișinău	Russian	1941
Latvian SSR	Pionieris	Pioneer	Riga	Latvian	1946
Kyrgyz SSR	Кыргызстан пионери	Pioneer of Kyrgyzstan	Frunze (Bishkek)	Kyrgyz	1933
Tajik SSR	Пионери Тоҷикистон	Pioneer of Tajikistan	Dushanbe	Tajik	1929
Armenian SSR	Պիոներ Կանչ	Pioneer's call	Yerevan	Armenian	1925
Turkmen SSR	Мыдам тайяр	Always ready	Ashkhabad	Turkmen	1930
Estonian SSR	Säde	Spark	Tallinn	Estonian	1946

== See also ==
- Eastern Bloc information dissemination
