= The Dog in the Manger (play) =

Comedy of Lope de Vega

The Dog in the Manger or The Gardener's Dog (Spanish: El Perro del Hortelano [el ˈpero ðel oɾteˈlano]) is a 1618 play by the Spanish playwright Lope de Vega. Its title refers to the proverb of the dog in the manger – it is an adaptation of a Spanish version of the story which deals with the emotional complications of class conflict. The haughty countess Diana rejects her many aristocratic suitors and falls in love instead with her handsome young secretary, Teodoro, who is the lover of her maid. Unwilling to let the couple marry, she is also unwilling to marry him herself.

De Vega's title relates to the parallel European idiom current in Dutch, Danish, German, French, Portuguese, Polish and Italian as well. It refers to a variant story in which a gardener sets his dog to guard his cabbages (or lettuces). After the gardener's death the dog continues to forbid people access to the beds, giving rise to the simile "he's like the gardener's dog that eats no cabbage and won't let others either" or, for short, "playing the gardener's dog" (Spanish: ser el perro del hortelano, French: faire le chien du jardinier, Polish: (być jak) pies ogrodnika, etc.).

The play was adapted for Russian TV as Собака на сене (Sobaka na sene) in 1977 and released in the USA as The Dog in the Manger. The same title was applied to the Spanish film made of the play by Pilar Miró, released in 1996.
