= Samuel Howitt =

English painter

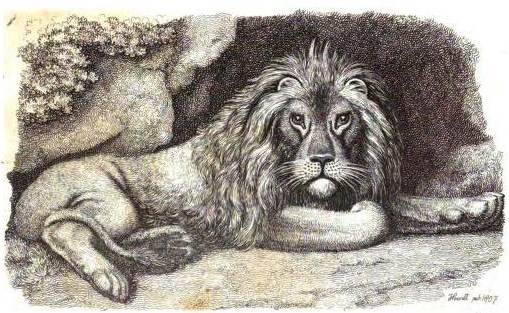
Lion resting, copper engraving included in Groups of Animals (1811)

Samuel Howitt (1756/57–1822) was an English painter, illustrator and etcher of animals, hunting, horse-racing and landscape scenes. He worked in both oils and watercolors.

== Life and work ==
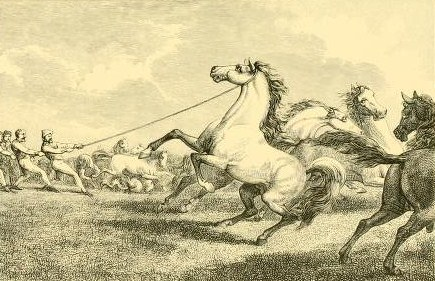
Taking wild horses on the plains of Moldavia (wood engraving after Howitt))

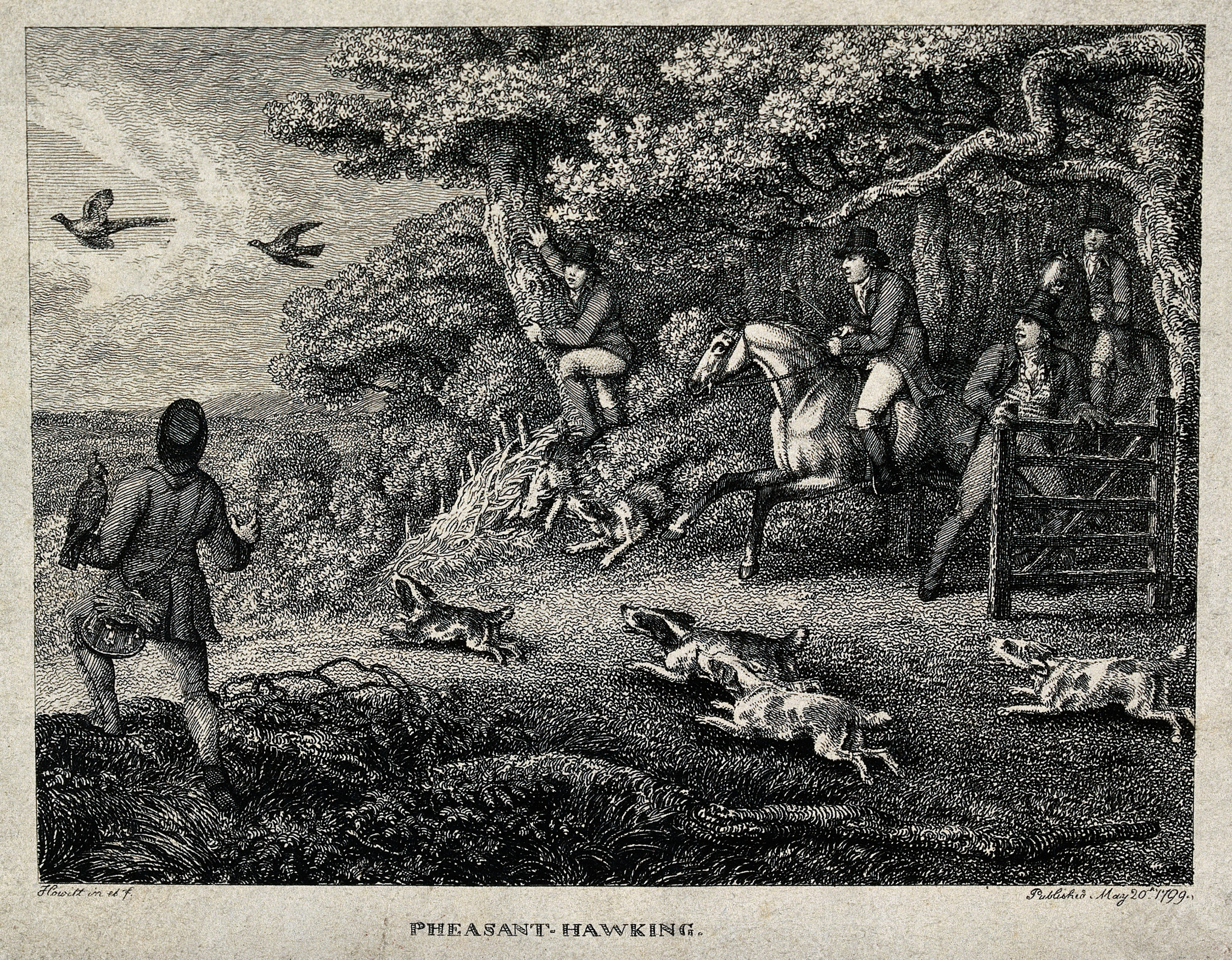
Pheasant hawking, 1799

Howitt was a member of an old Nottinghamshire Quaker family. In early life he lived at Chigwell, near Epping Forest, Essex, was financially independent and devoted himself to field sports. However he ran into financial difficulties and was obliged to turn to art as a profession - which up until then he had engaged in as a talented amateur.

Coming to London, he was for a time a drawing master at Samuel Goodenough's school in Ealing. In 1783, he exhibited 3 coloured drawings of hunting subjects with the Incorporated Society of Artists. From time to time he continued to exhibit there and at the Royal Academy, beginning in 1784 with a hunting piece, followed in 1785 by two landscapes - "A view of the ruins of an abbey" and "Fairlop Oak". In 1793 he showed "Jaques and the Deer" and "A Fox Hunt"; in 1794, "Smugglers alarmed"; in 1800, two pictures titled "Deer"; in 1814 "Dead game"; and in 1815, "Bella, horrida Bella". He probably exhibited so little because he was in such demand as a commercial illustrator.

Howitt worked both in oils and water-colours, for the most part confining himself to sporting subjects and illustrations of natural history, which were carefully executed, spirited and truthful. These, as Howitt represented in his New Work of Animals, were “drawn from the life" and published so as to "assist the pencil of the designer who has not had an opportunity to pay the same attention to this branch of the art”. However, notes in one sketchbook containing watercolours of apes and monkeys indicate that, while some there certainly were viewed in private menageries, others were studies of stuffed specimens from William Bullock’s museum and the British Museum.

Howitt was closely associated in his art with Thomas Rowlandson, whose sister he married, and his works did, at one time, often pass for those of his brother-in-law; but, unlike Rowlandson, he was a practical sportsman, and his scenes were more accurately composed. He was a clever and industrious etcher, and published a great number of plates similar in character to his drawings, and delicately executed with a fine needle. He also produced a number of caricatures in the manner of Rowlandson.

Howitt was particularly noted for the illustrations in (Captain) Thomas Williamson's Oriental Field Sports (1807), based on sketches made by the author in India . He also illustrated several other works: Thoughts on Hunting (London: D. Bremner, 1798), Other publications included Miscellaneous Etchings of Animals (50 plates, 1803); British Field Sports (20 coloured plates, 1807); The Angler's Manual (12 plates, 1808); A New Work of Animals (100 plates, 1811); Groups of Animals (24 plates, 1811); The British Sportsman (70 plates, 1812); Foreign Field Sports (110 plates, 1819).

In 1822 Howitt died in Somers Town, London, and was buried in St. Pancras cemetery.

== A new work of animals ==
Some idea of Howitt’s ingenuity and commercial resourcefulness can be gained from considering his compilation of A New Work of Animals, a series of copper engravings in quarto format “principally designed from the fables of Aesop, Gay and Phaedrus”. The idea of an album of animal portraits is presented in a prefatory note as a new venture that “strange as it may appear, has never before been done by any British artist”. Howitt “has preferred representing most of the animals in fables, as allowing more scope for delineating the expression, the character and the passions,” and he hopes that, by being "studious to attain correctness, he may deserve the approbation of the natural historian" and instruct fellow painters. This will explain why, out of a hundred plates, only 56 illustrate fables, the rest being of animal or hunting subjects.

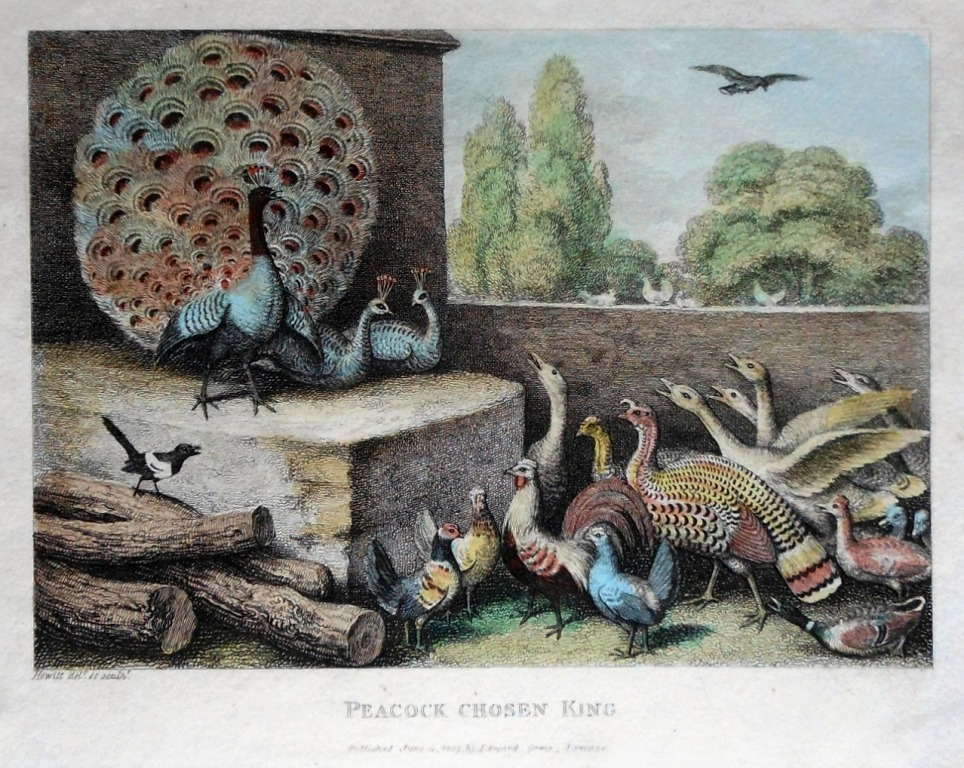
The fable of "The Peacock Chosen King", a tinted plate from A New Work of Animals

For the text of the fables, Howitt had extracted those of Aesop (and Phaedrus) from the prose collection of Samuel Croxall, including his lengthy moralising "applications". John Gay's fables are in rhyme and only account for 27 pages out of 106 of text. Separate plates were bound in sideways opposite the title, followed by one of the supplementary illustrations. However, beneath the title of each plate there is an inscription indicating that some of these were designed in the years 1809-10, antedating the publication of the book itself in 1811 and suggesting that they were sold separately at that date, and probably afterwards too. Since fables carried a moral, they had wider popular appeal than elitist sporting subjects and could be mounted on walls for the edification of whoever saw them. Such plates were available in both black and white and in tinted versions. In addition, Howitt also created watercolours from the designs that were sold with the moral printed round the card mount. In this way, from a single work the artist was able to extract three sources of income.

A second edition of the whole book was published in 1818. Howitt's plates were also to be republished after his death. Further evidence of the esteem in which his work continued to be held was the use made of six illustrations as the basis of the Mintons, Hollins set of Aesop's Fables tiles, first issued in 1870, sixty years later. These included “The Tortoise and the Hare”, “The Cock, the Dog and the Fox”, “The Sick Stag”, “The Boar and the Fox”, “The Bear and the Travellers” and “The Bear and the Bees”.

== Bibliography (selected) ==
Illustrated by Howitt:

- Oriental Field Sports: Being a Complete, Detailed, and Accurate Description of the Wild Sports of the East; and Exhibiting, in a Novel and Interesting Manner, the Natural History of the Elephant, the Rhinoceros, the Tiger, the Leopard, the Bear, the Deer, the Buffalo, the Wolf, the Wild Hog, the Jackall, the Wild Dog, the Civet, and Other Undomesticated Animals: As Likewise the Different Species of Feathered Game, Fishes, and Serpents, London 1807, Volume 1
- Groups of Animals, Containing Forty-four Plates, Drawn from the Life and Etched, London 1811
- A New Work of Animals, London 1811; a better and more complete copy is accessible in the Online Archive
- Foreign Field Sports, Fisheries, Sporting Anecdotes,&c, London 1819
