= Vitaly Goryaev =

Soviet artist (1910–1982)

- Born: April 14, 1910; Kurgan, Tobolsk Governorate, Russian Empire
- Died: 12 April 1982 (aged 71); Moscow, Soviet Union
- Education: Moscow State University of Printing Arts
- Style: Painting, graphics, illustration, caricature
- Awards: Order of the Red Star; 1945; Medal For Courage; 1943; Medal "For Battle Merit" Jubilee Medal "In Commemoration of the 100th Anniversary of the Birth of Vladimir Ilyich Lenin" Medal "For the Victory over Germany in the Great Patriotic War 1941–1945" Jubilee Medal "Twenty Years of Victory in the Great Patriotic War 1941–1945" Jubilee Medal "Thirty Years of Victory in the Great Patriotic War 1941–1945" Medal "For the Capture of Königsberg" Jubilee Medal "50 Years of the Armed Forces of the USSR" Jubilee Medal "60 Years of the Armed Forces of the USSR" Order of Friendship; 1974

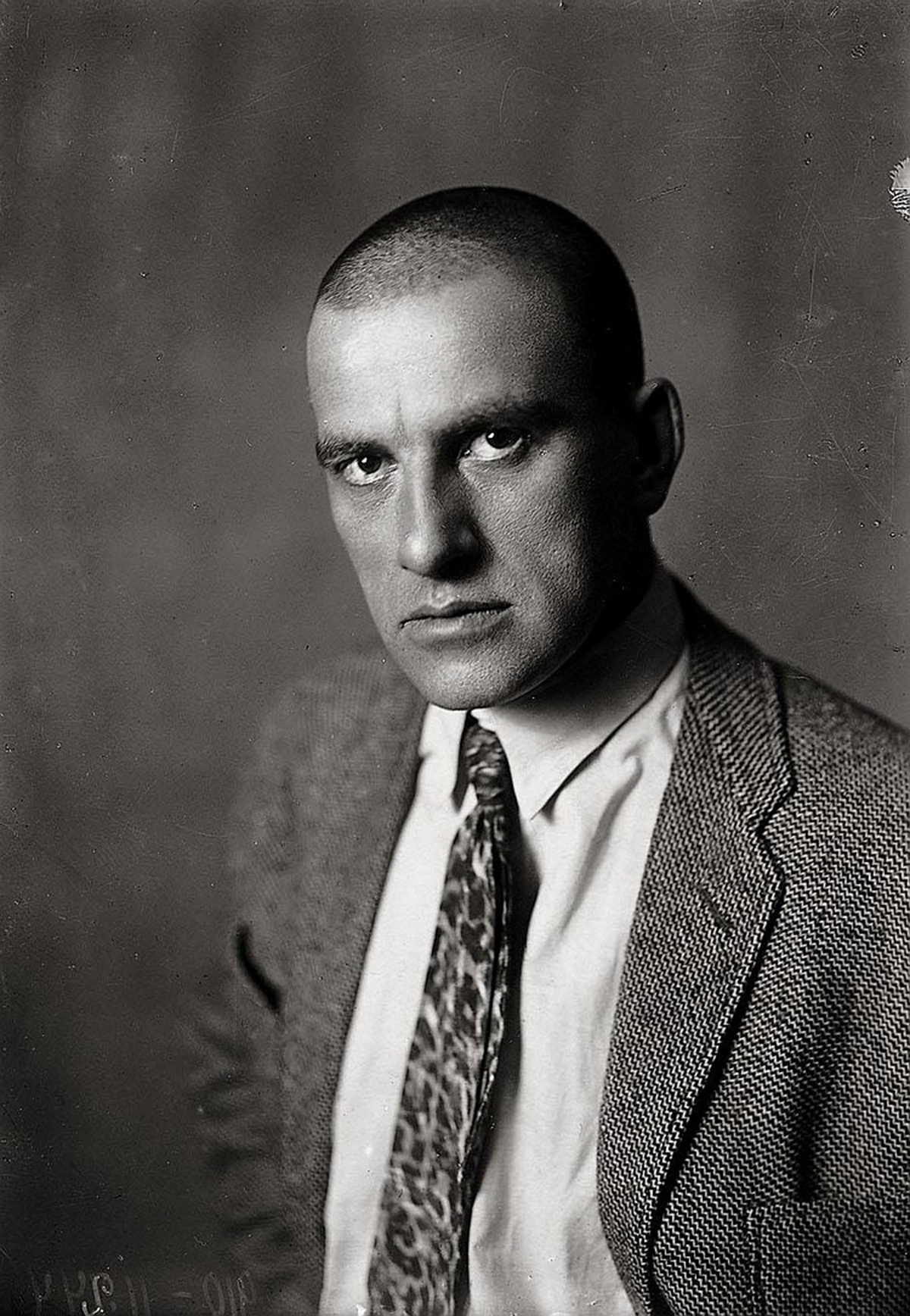
Vladimir Mayakovsky

Vitaly Nikolayevich Goryaev (Russian: Виталий Николаевич Горяев; 14 April [O.S. 1 April] 1910 – 12 April 1982) was a Soviet and Russian painter, graphic illustrator and caricaturist. He was awarded the title People's Visual Artist of the USSR in 1981 and a recipients of the USSR State Prize in 1967.

== Biography ==
=== Early years ===
Vitaly Goryaev was born on 14 April 1910 in the family of a bank manager in Kurgan, Tobolsk Governorate (now the administrative centre of the Kurgan Oblast).

In 1921, he relocated with his family to Chita, where he began his creative journey. He received guidance from the local artist, Ivan Sverkunov, and accompanied him on study trips. He drew caricatures for the school newspaper in the style of popular magazines such as Smekhach and Prozhektor, and attempted to create illustrations in the style of Vladimir Lebedev. As a schoolboy, he started contributing to Zabaikalsky Rabochiy. Initially, he cut out other people's drawings on linoleum, but later he began creating his own.

The artist-to-be had other interests besides drawing. At 17, he experimented with circus and operetta, but ultimately designed sets, posters, and programs for productions. He also wrote poems in the style of V. Mayakovsky, which were eagerly printed by Chita newspapers. He made acquaintances with local poets and was accepted into the Chita Association of Proletarian Writers. However, in his later life, poems played a less significant role than the drawings he used to illustrate his own manuscripts.

In 1929, after graduating from high school, he enrolled in the Moscow Higher Technical School with the intention of studying bridge design. It was during this time that he had a fateful encounter with the poet V. Mayakovsky. The artist recounted the details of this meeting in various ways. According to Soviet sources, a student from a technical school approached the Moscow Association of Proletarian Writers to have a collection of Chita poets reviewed. However, he was unable to obtain a response or a manuscript. V. Mayakovsky assisted him in obtaining the manuscripts and agreed to assess his poems. Later, Mayakovsky's attention was drawn to a folder of drawings that the young man was carrying with him. During the modern period, the artist's family claims that he met V. Mayakovsky while playing billiards. They struck up a conversation and the artist challenged the famous poet to a game, which he won. As a result, the artist asked Mayakovsky to evaluate his manuscripts, which included illustrations of his own work in addition to poems. Although Mayakovsky was not interested in the poems, he was impressed by the drawings and convinced the artist to pursue a career in art instead of his technical speciality. V. Mayakovsky himself retrieved his documents from the school and went to the rector of the Higher Art and Technical Institute (VKhUTEIN), Pavel Novitsky, with Goryaev, to persuade Novitsky to hold an exam for the young man, despite the admission tests having already ended. As a result, Goryaev was admitted as a student of the Higher Art and Technical Institute.

Acquaintance with V. Mayakovsky changed the poet's life and developed into a friendship and creative collaboration. Mayakovsky entrusted him with the design of his exhibitions, including the exhibition 20 Years of Mayakovsky's Work in 1930, shortly before his death. In his book I Saw Them..., cartoonist Joseph Igin cites a story that his friend from the institute, V. Goryaev, told him in 1970s. During his cooperation with V. Mayakovsky, V. Goryaev was experiencing financial difficulties. Upon learning of this, the poet assisted him in securing a job as a costume designer at the Bolshoi Theatre. Due to his good physical condition, V. Goryaev was able to perform on stage as part of the corps de ballet in the production Footballer.

=== Studies ===
In his second year at VKhUTEIN, he joined the poster and lithographic department led by Dmitry Moor. Later, he enrolled at the Polygraphic Institute (now the Moscow State University of Printing Arts), which was formed by merging Moscow and Leningrad VKhUTEIN. There, he studied under Alexandr Deyneka, Sergey Gerasimov, Pavel Pavlinov, Konstantin Istomin, Lev Bruni, and Vladimir Favorsky.

From 1931, he was a member of the Young October Art Association, and from 1932, he joined the newly formed Union of Artists of the USSR. At the insistence of D. Moore, while still a student, he began to participate in exhibitions and work for newspapers and magazines such as Bezbozhnik, Smena, Pioneer, and Propagandist. In 1934, he graduated from the institute, but, according to his son, was left without a diploma due to his difficult character.

His institute acquaintance Sergey Urusevsky recalled how in 1936, together with artist Viktor Vakidin they decided to sketch Vsevolod Meyerhold's productions. To gain access to the theatre, they created a petition on behalf of the institute. They reviewed and observed numerous productions, and this experience had a lasting impact on their future work. Goryaev spoke with Vs. Meyerhold, who suggested that he draw what was happening behind the scenes of the theatre instead of the events on stage. V. Goryaev was fascinated and created many drawings of backstage life, but unfortunately, they were lost in a fire during the war.

== Creative work ==
=== Magazine graphics ===
After graduating, he was assigned to the publishing house Izobrazitelnoye Iskusstvo, where he worked until the spring of 1935. During this time, he created several posters that were awarded competitive prizes. Following this, he accepted an invitation from the People's Commissariat of the River Fleet to become an artist on the propaganda steamer Propagandist. He travelled along the Volga and Kama rivers until the autumn of 1936, working at the wharves. At each new stop, the artist and the propaganda steamer's management learned about the state of local affairs, identified achievements and problems. The artist then worked on cartoons, slogans, and caustic caricatures. One individual who took issue with his drawing filed a complaint with the editorial office, alleging that he was impersonating a staff member of the magazine Krokodil. The magazine took notice and requested a meeting with the artist to discuss the matter. After clarifying the situation, the editorial board expressed appreciation for the artist's work and commissioned him to create a full-page drawing featuring water transport. Since then, he has frequently collaborated with Krokodil. His colleagues at the publication, including Leonid Soifertis, Yuliy Ganf, and Ivan Semyonov, became his good friends, and Lev Brodaty also became his teacher. He also collaborated with other illustrated publications, such as Smena and Tridtsat Dney. His cooperation with the magazine Yunost was particularly long, where he was a member of the editorial board from 1955 to 1981. The artist's cartoons published in the magazines were also published in independent collections.

=== Working as a war correspondent ===
His initial war writings date back to the autumn of 1939 when he was sent as a war correspondent to the territories of Western Ukraine and Western Belarus, which were annexed to the USSR as a result of the Polish campaign of the Red Army. He signed most of the sheets as Western Ukraine. During this trip, he created numerous genre drawings and watercolours, which were exhibited in Moscow in 1940. He also visited the annexed Baltic states.

During the early stages of the war between the USSR and Germany, he was employed at Okna TASS. In under six months, he produced 80 posters with the primary objective of exposing the 'new order' imposed by the Nazis in Western Europe. At the end of 1941, he led the Kuibyshev branch of Okna TASS for a period of time. Together with Nikolai Sokolov of the Kukryniksy team, he created several iconic posters, including the well-known caricature poster of Adolf Hitler and his entourage, Crows in Peacock Feathers.

In January 1942, the artist was suspended from work on Okna TASS after being denounced by a fellow graphic artist. The following month, he was drafted into the Workers' and Peasants' Red Army by the Soviet district military commissariat of Moscow. He was sent to the Western Front to serve as an art director and executive secretary of the military satirical magazine Frontovoy Yumor. This magazine was published in the format of unfolded sheets under the size of an officer's tablet and contained feuilletons, journalistic notes from the front line, poems and caustic caricatures of the enemy, designed to maintain the army's morale. Poets Alexey Surkov and Mikhail Matusovsky wrote to the magazine. Graphic artists Orest Goncharov, Yevgeny Yevgan, Andrey Goncharov, Boris Yefimov, Ivan Semyonov and Kukryniksy, painters Alexander Bubnov, Pavel Sokolov-Skalya and Pyotr Shukhmin collaborated under the guidance of the artist. Frontovoy Yumor was printed in city printing houses near the front line and in dugouts. After the liberation of Smolensk, the editorial office had a topography train. The magazine was edited by P. Bannik, M. Kogan, T. Mironov, M. Slobodskoy, and L. Shapiro. Between 1941 and 1945, the publication frequency of the magazine varied: 4 issues were published in 1941, 17 in 1942, 12 in 1943, 12 in 1944, and 6 in 1945. Between 1941 and 1945. The editorial office of Krasnoarmeyskaya Pravda, where the artist's drawings were also published, was located near Frontovoy Yumor, and the artist formed a strong friendship with its chief editor, Aleksandr Tvardovsky.

My father did not like to talk about the war and did not give any details to his family. But once I heard a television interview in which he told a story of how he had gone to the front line with Tvardovsky. How afraid he was, but he tried not to show it, because looking like a coward in Alexander Trifonovich's eyes was even scarier...

— Lyubov Goryaeva, daughter of Vitaly Goryaev

For each issue of Frontovoy Yumor, he drew one or two cartoons. During the war, he created genre drawings based on real-life experiences and fresh impressions, depicting scenes from the front and the work of the home front. Several caricatures from the series New Order in Western Europe were exhibited at the Great Patriotic War exhibition in Moscow in 1943. The works comprising the On the Roads of War series were created through lithography. In 1944, they were exhibited alongside other war works by graphic artists Lev Brodaty and Aminadav Kanevsky. The artist finished the war in Königsberg with the rank of captain and was awarded the Order of the Red Star, as well as the medals "For Bravery", "For Battle Merit", "For the Capture of Koenigsberg", and "For the Victory over Germany in the Great Patriotic War 1941–1945."

=== Creative trips ===
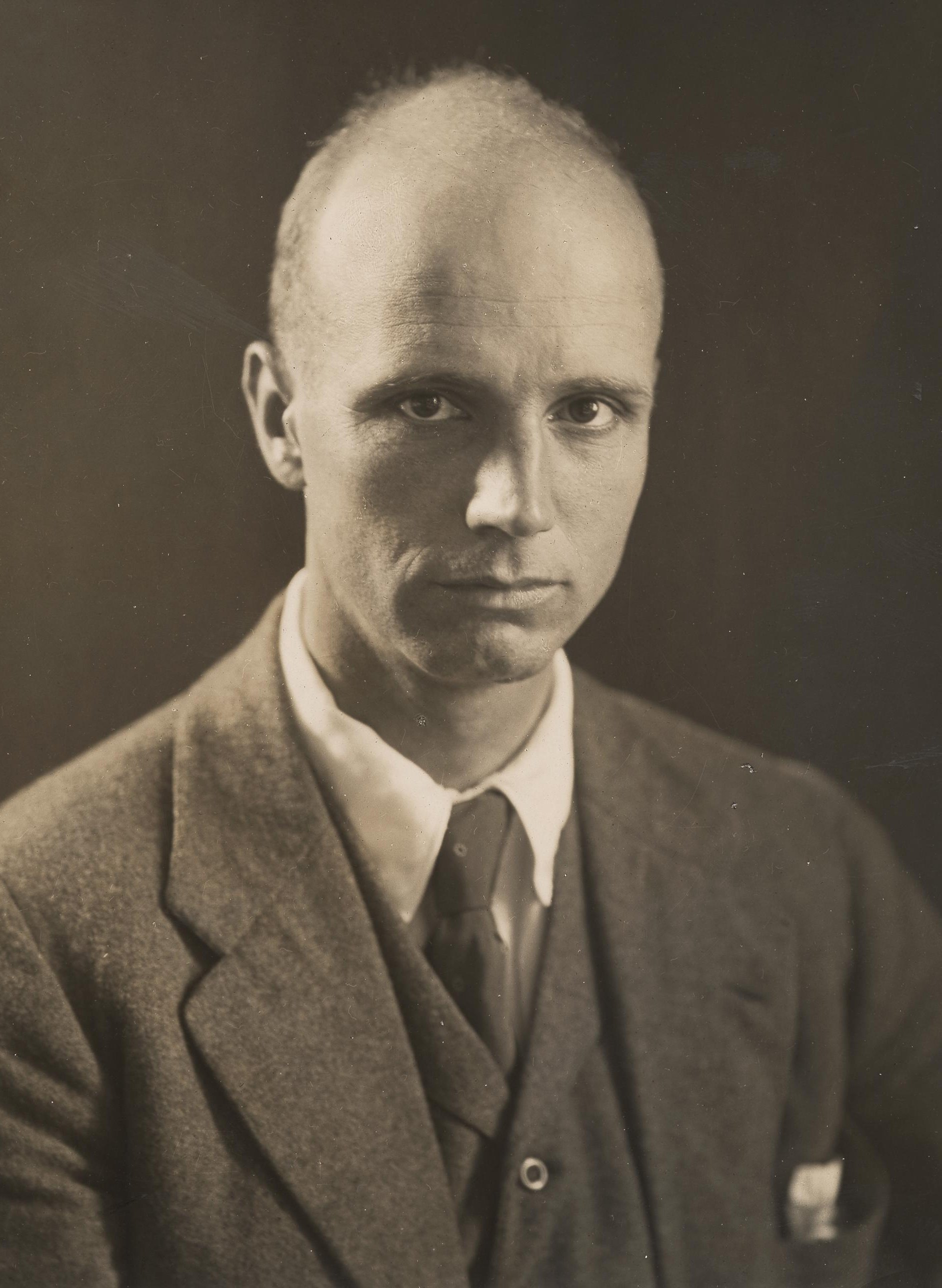
Rockwell Kent

During the 1950s, the artist travelled extensively throughout the Soviet Union and abroad during the Khrushchev Thaw. He visited the Kakhovka Dam construction site twice in 1953–1954, where he created a series of genre drawings and watercolours. In 1956, he presented these works, along with post-war illustrations, at a joint exhibition with Konstantin Dorokhov, Sulamifi Zaslavskaya, Sarra Lebedeva, Andrei Goncharov, and Ilya Slonim in Moscow. It was, in fact, six separate expositions under a common roof, which became the artists' first large solo exhibitions.

In 1958, he was among the first Soviet intellectuals to visit the United States after the war. He travelled with the artist Ivan Semyonov, invited by the editorial office of Krokodil to attend the congress held in Indianapolis by the Association of American Editorial Cartoonists. Following the event, he missed his flight due to unforeseen circumstances. As flights between the countries were infrequent, the American side offered to extend his visa. In May–June 1958, he visited Indianapolis, New York City, Washington, D.C., and Boston, and had the opportunity to meet with President Dwight Eisenhower. During the trip, he earned money through his drawings. He arranged for publications in the New-York Tribune, and during the famous Indianapolis races, he drew illustrations for the hourly rush issues of newspapers. His sketches and observations formed the basis of a series of 40 drawings titled 'Americans at Home', which were exhibited and appreciated in both the USSR and the USA. For instance, the Moskovsky Khudozhnik newspaper for 1959 published a letter by the American artist Rockwell Kent in No. 6-7:

Dear Mr Editor!
This letter, believe me, is not so much an occasion to thank you for the small, friendly article about me in No. 11 of your magazine for 1958, as it is an opportunity to express my admiration, which I think all Americans should feel when looking at the most beautiful satirical drawings of Vitaly Goryaev. Robert Burns wrote:

Oh who could give us the power / To see ourselves through the eyes of others.

The magazine "Culture and Life", publishing drawings by V. Goryaev, has given us such a power. The Soviet artist's drawings, sharp, full of friendly humour, will help us to see ourselves from the outside and will contribute to the establishment of friendship between our two peoples.

— Yours sincerely, Rockwell Kent.

During the summer of 1959, the artist took a creative trip to Palanga in the Lithuanian SSR, where he produced approximately 60 genre drawings and compositions. In the autumn, he travelled to France with a group of journalists and writers, where he had the opportunity to meet with Pablo Picasso, Nadia Léger, and Jean Effel. During this trip, the artist produced over 100 drawings from life, which was a departure from his usual method of collecting impressions and sketches during the day and reproducing them in the evening. In the same year, his French works were presented in a group exhibition. Additionally, personal exhibitions featuring works from various journeys taken between 1958 and 1959 were held in Vilnius and Kaunas in March and April 1960. The artist travelled to Finland, Bulgaria, the GDR, Romania, France, Czechoslovakia, Poland and Ceylon. Each trip resulted in a new series of drawings. Additionally, the artist revisited the US, where acquaintances attempted to arrange a meeting with Ernest Hemingway due to their similar appearance, but it was not realised.

=== Illustrations ===
The artist began illustrating fiction in the late 1930s, but only revealed himself in this capacity after the war. His early works include illustrations for several stories published in magazines, as well as the books Diary of a Provincial in St Petersburg, The Tashkenters Clique by Mikhail Saltykov-Shchedrin, and My Street by Sergey Mikhalkov.

The artist created illustrations for Mark Twain's The Adventures of Tom Sawyer and Adventures of Huckleberry Finn twice – first in 1948 and then in 1960 after his trip to the United States. The illustrations created in 1948 were well-received and bought by both the Russian Museum and the State Tretyakov Gallery. Tom Sawyer was reprinted multiple times, while only some of the illustrations for Huckleberry Finn were published. Additionally, he produced illustrations for several other Mark Twain stories, including The Man That Corrupted Hadleyburg, Senator Dilworthy, and How I Edited an Agricultural Newspaper.

Agniya Barto practically granted him a monopoly on illustrating her works. His drawings were published in Swings (1946), The House Has Moved (1947 and 1949), Poems for Children, Petya Draws, The Redskins, and About the Big and the Small (1959). The artist is credited with the first illustrations for Yury Olesha's The Three Fat Men, which became a reference point for the style chosen by the authors of the 1966 film adaptation. His illustrations were used to illustrate several works, including 'About the Tsar and the Shoemaker' and 'A True Story' by Samuil Marshak, 'The White Sail is Lonely' by Valentin Kataev, 'What is Good and What is Bad' by Vladimir Mayakovsky, Little Pete Stories by Leila Berg (1956), and 'Old Man Hottabych' by Lazar Lagin. He illustrated several works including O. Henry's short stories, Theodore Dreiser's An American Tragedy, Hans Scherfig's The Scorpion, and Martti Larni's pamphlet novel The Fourth Vertebra.

Illustrations for classic Russian literature, including works by Alexander Pushkin, Nikolai Gogol, and Fyodor Dostoevsky, held a special place in the artist's work. The illustrations for Gogol's Petersburg Tales, which the artist worked on from the late 1950s to the mid-1960s, were awarded the USSR State Prize in 1967. In 1971, F. Dostoevsky's The Idiot was published with illustrations by the artist. Four years later, the illustrations earned him a gold medal at the Leipzig Book Fair. However, in the USSR, the illustrations were met with a scathing review in the magazine Communist due to their artistic avant-garde. In 1974, a two-volume book of Pushkin's Poems and Tales with drawings by the artist was published, and in 1979 – Dead Souls by N. Gogol. His last major work in this direction was The Adolescent by F. Dostoevsky, published after the artist's death.

=== Painting ===
The artist's interest in painting began in 1929 after he was introduced to the work of Paul Cézanne through a small painting titled Morning on the Marne. He continued to paint for the rest of his life, but did not achieve fame as a painter. His works, which stylistically followed the post-impressionists and avant-gardists of the 1920s and were close to cubism and miriskusniki, were unexpected for their time and did not align with the ideals of socialist realism. The artist received harsh criticism from Vladimir Kemenov, vice-president of the USSR Academy of Arts, for being avant-garde. Despite being a famous artist and winner of the State Prize, he was denied admission to the academy more than 10 times, which is an exceptional case. In 1980, the only lifetime exhibition of the artist's paintings took place, coinciding with his 70th birthday. Recently, in 2012, a major exhibition of the artist's work was held at the Central House of Artists, where the paintings were presented to the general public for the first time since the exhibition in 1980. The artist executed approximately 100 paintings, with only a small number acquired by major museums.

== Public activity ==
Member of the VKP(b) since 1951.

He was involved in public life, frequently communicating with colleagues and art enthusiasts, and had a significant impact on the younger generation of Soviet artists. He participated in the activities of the Board of the Moscow Organization of the Union of Artists (MOSKh) and the Secretariat of the Union of Artists of the USSR, and served on many juries and commissions. The artist headed the commission responsible for allowing works by avant-garde artists of the New Reality studio to be exhibited at the 30 Years of the Moscow Artists' Union exhibition in the Moscow Manege in 1962. During Nikita Khrushchev's visit to the exhibition, he was infuriated by the non-conformist art, and as a result, the artist responsible for the exhibition was disgraced and had his contracts cancelled. They resumed working with him in 1964, only after Khrushchev had resigned as General Secretary of the Communist Party of the Soviet Union.

Vitaly Nikolayevich Goryaev died on 12 April 1982 in Moscow. He is buried in Vagankovskoye Cemetery (plot 24).

== Creative method ==
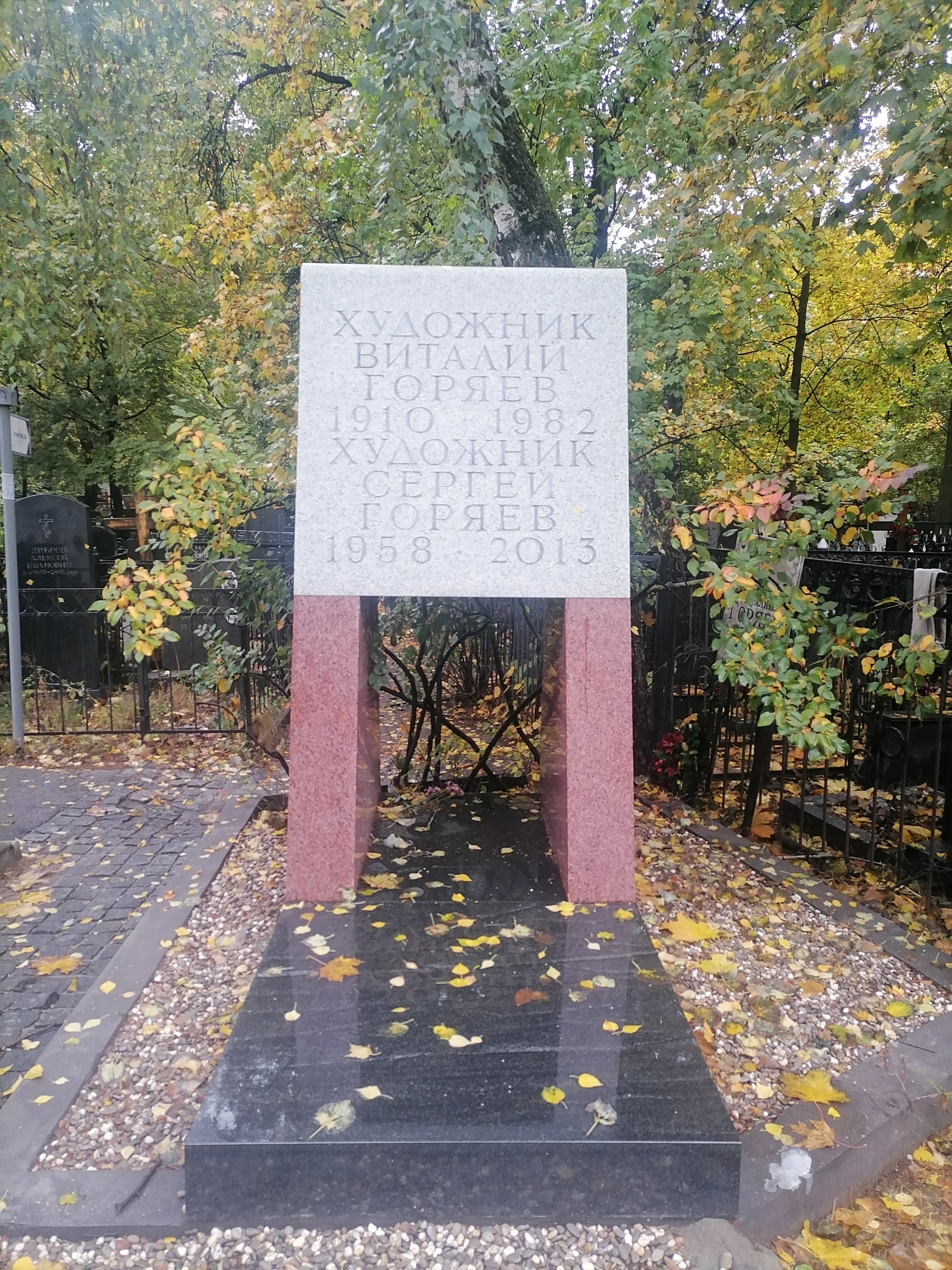
Grave at Vagankovskoye cemetery

According to family members, the artist was highly productive. He began each morning by creating a few illustrations for urgent orders, and then proceeded to paint an easel work every day, whether it be a portrait, still life, or landscape. Colleagues noted that the artist worked in various locations, including at home, in the studio, on the street, and on the road. He was constantly sketching future works in his diaries and recording observations during meetings and appointments. In contrast, his illustrations for literary works required years of meticulous effort. For each book, he created approximately one hundred original illustrations and numerous preliminary drawings to develop the mise-en-scene and characters. He began with a blank book of the necessary format, planning the arrangement of illustrations and text to ensure a consistent unfolding of the story from page to page. The process of preparing the illustrations was complex. The artist created a pencil drawing, which was then transferred to photographic paper. A chemist adjusted the contrast according to instructions, and the final result was finished with ink and whites to ensure high-quality printing within the limited possibilities of printing.

The authorial style of the artist developed and crystallised over time. In the 1930s, the artist incorporated means and methods into his graphic works for magazines that were atypical for this art form. For example, he used thin lines in an Impressionist manner to convey the material flesh of things. During his time at Frontovoy Yumor, the artist's visual language became clearer and more concise due to difficult working conditions, tight deadlines, scarce printing resources, and the need to convey ideas to a wide audience. His works during this period for the magazine were not limited to caricatures, but also included genre works depicting military life. The satirical element was often conveyed through the use of sharp captions.

The artist's main method for genre drawing was not to work directly from nature, but to fixate impressions in memory or create quick sketches and reproduce what he saw in the studio. The artist did not aim to reproduce reality faithfully, but rather to reveal and emphasise the most important details. This approach resulted in works that were even more natural and truthful than the artist's own sketches. The artist developed his own system of studying people, focusing on how their character and social status are reflected in their postures, habits, gestures, and behaviour in different surroundings. He reduced the variety of human states to a few basic plastic positions, which he recorded on paper for many years by cultivating his powers of observation.

There is a tendency that guides me in choosing what I paint. It is my understanding of the world, my connection to it. A tendency is the desire of my people, my party, which has become my desire, dictating my choice and determining my attitude to what I want to paint. A trend gives rise to the artist's vision and method. It determines the strength and direction of his work.

In life drawings I am interested in contrasts: the meeting of dark with light, soft with hard, big with small, a stone city with a mountain or water, violence with passivity, prickly with soft, and so on. This search for contrasts allows me to operate freely with elements of nature and develop a compositional vision. I used to draw from life with little or no plastic connection between individual parts, objects and figures. Now I try to extract the truth of the artistic image from the elements of nature. What I have drawn is not documentary, but characteristic. Often, building the composition of the sheet, I put in the drawing figures, details, objects not in the place they occupy in nature, but from this depicted scenes do not lose their vitality, on the contrary, they become more convincing.

In order for me to start drawing from life, apart from a substantial and interesting subject, it is important for me to have what I call a "constructive stimulus", i.e. to be interested in some unexpected turn, combination of forms, construction and design of figures, movement. These constructive features best and most fully express both the psychology and character of a person and his actions – that is, habits, movements, postures.

— Vitaly Goryaev

=== Family ===
- First wife – Valentina Pavlovna Deopik (1907–1990).
  - Son – Dega Vitalievich Deopik (born 1932), Doctor of Historical Sciences, professor, orientalist.
- Second wife – Taisia Borisovna Lobach-Zhuchenko (1920–2017).
  - Son – Sergey Vitalievich Goryaev (1958–2013), People's Artist of the Russian Federation, professor.
  - Daughter – Lyubov Vitalievna Goryaeva (born 1946), candidate of philological sciences, researcher and translator of ancient Malay manuscripts.

== Awards and titles ==
=== Titles ===
- Honored Artist of the RSFSR (1966)
- People's Artist of the RSFSR (1976)
- People's Artist of the USSR (1981)

=== State awards ===
- USSR State Prize (1967) – for illustrations for Dostoevsky's Petersburg Tales
- Order of the Red Star (1945)
- Medal "For Courage" (1943)
- Medal "For Battle Merit"
- Jubilee Medal "In Commemoration of the 100th Anniversary of the Birth of Vladimir Ilyich Lenin" (1970)
- Medal "For the Capture of Königsberg"
- Medal "For the Victory over Germany in the Great Patriotic War 1941–1945"
- Jubilee Medal "Twenty Years of Victory in the Great Patriotic War 1941–1945"
- Jubilee Medal "Thirty Years of Victory in the Great Patriotic War 1941–1945"
- Jubilee Medal "50 Years of the Armed Forces of the USSR"
- Jubilee Medal "60 Years of the Armed Forces of the USSR"
- Order of Friendship (1974, Czechoslovakia)

=== Creative Awards ===
- First degree diploma of the All-Union contest The Best Books (1962) – for illustrations to Adventures of Huckleberry Finn by Mark Twain
- First degree diploma of the All-Union contest The Best Books (1965) for illustrations to Petersburg Tales by Nikolai Gogol
- Second degree diploma of the International Book Exhibition in Bratislava (1967) – for illustrations to Petersburg Tales by Nikolai Gogol
- Gold Medal of the Czechoslovak Union of International Relations (1969) for services in the development of friendship and co-operation with Czechoslovakia
- Honorary plaquette Golden Apple (1975) – for participation in the organisation and holding of the International Biennale of Children's Books (BIB) in Bratislava
- Gold Medal of the International Exhibition of Book Art in Leipzig (1975) – for a series of illustrations for Fyodor Dostoevsky's novel The Idiot

== Exhibitions and publications ==
=== Exhibitions ===
List of Vitaly Goryaev's exhibitions

Lifetime exhibitions

- 1931 – Exhibition of Young Artists (Vsekohudozhudozhnik), Moscow
- 1936–1937 – Exhibition of graphic artists, Moscow
- 1937 – Exhibition of works by Moscow masters of Soviet satire, Moscow
- 1938 – Exhibition of works by the masters of Soviet satire, Moscow
- 1939 – Exhibition of illustrations to the works of M.E. Saltykov-Shchedrin, Moscow
- 1939 – Exhibition of paintings and graphic drawings, Moscow
- 1940 – Exhibition of drawings, illustrations and posters, Moscow
- 1941 – Exhibition of works by Moscow masters of Soviet satire, Moscow
- 1941 – Exhibition of the best works of Soviet artists, Moscow
- 1942 – Works of Moscow artists during the Great Patriotic War, Moscow
- 1943 – The Great Patriotic War Exhibition, Moscow
- 1944 – Exhibit of the 6 (Brodaty, Goryaev, Kanevsky and others)
- 1946 – Exhibition of graphics, watercolours and drawings by Soviet artists, Warsaw
- 1946 – Exhibition of Soviet satire, Prague
- 1947 – Annual Reporting Exhibition of DETGIZ, Moscow
- 1948 – Travelling exhibition of Soviet painting and graphics, Dnipropetrovsk
- 1949 – Travelling exhibition of Soviet satire, Moscow
- 1950 – Exhibition of painting, sculpture, political satire and graphics by Moscow artists, Moscow
- 1950 – Exhibition Struggle for peace, against warmongers, Moscow
- 1950 – All-Union Art Exhibition, Moscow
- 1951 – Exhibition of works by artists of satire, Moscow
- 1951 – All-Union Art Exhibition, Moscow
- 1951 – Exhibition of books and book graphics by DETGIZ, Moscow
- 1952 – Exhibition of Soviet Satire, Moscow
- 1953 – Exhibition of Soviet graphic satirists, London
- 1953 – Exhibition of works of Soviet art and collections of the State Tretyakov Gallery
- 1954 и 1955 – All-Union Art Exhibition, Moscow
- 1956 – Exhibition of works by A. Goncharov, V. Goryaev, K. Dorokhov, S. Zaslavskaya, S. Lebedeva, I. Slonim, Moscow
- 1957 – Exhibition for the First All-Union Congress of Soviet Artists, Moscow
- 1957 – 6th exhibition of works by book artists, Moscow
- 1958 – Exhibition of V. Goryaev and G. Nissky, Moscow
- 1958 – All-Union exhibition for the 40th anniversary of the Komsomol, Moscow
- 1959 – Exhibition of Works of Fine Art of Socialist Countries, Moscow
- 1959 – Exhibition of drawings and watercolours by V. Goryaev and I. Semyonov made during a trip to the USA in May–June 1958, Moscow
- 1959 – Exhibition of works by V. Goryaev, E. Kibrik, I. Semyonov What we did in France, Moscow
- 1960 – Exhibition of works by Soviet artists Across France
- 1960 – Personal exhibition of Goryaev's works America, France, Palanga – 1959, Vilnius, Kaunas
- 1961 – Exhibition of works by V. Goryaev, Ceylon. Colonialism is a thing of the past, Moscow, Colombo
- 1961 – Exhibition Moscow – the Capital of our Motherland, Moscow
- 1962 – Personal exhibition, Moscow
- 1963 – Exhibition of drawings and caricature of Krokodil magazine – I am 40 years old, Moscow
- 1963 – International Exhibition of Satirical Artists, New York City
- 1964 – All-Union Art Exhibition, Moscow
- 1964 – Personal exhibition of works by V. Goryaev, Moscow
- 1964 – 2nd exhibition of works by artists-journalists, Moscow
- 1964 – Exhibition of works by children's book illustrators
- 1965 – Personal exhibition (illustrations to works by N. Gogol, M. Twain, series of drawings and watercolours "On Yugoslavia), Moscow
- 1965 – Republican art exhibition Soviet Russia, Moscow
- 1966 – Personal exhibition, Moscow
- 1966 – Art exhibition for the 25th anniversary of the defeat of the Nazi troops near Moscow, Moscow
- 1966 – Exhibition Moscow artists of the front press, 1941–1945, Moscow
- 1967 – Exhibition 50 Years of Soviet Rule, Moscow
- 1967 – Republican art exhibition Soviet Russia, Moscow
- 1967 – All-Union Exhibition Soviet Political Poster for 50 Years, Moscow
- 1967 – Exhibition Artists of Moscow to the 50th Anniversary of the October Revolution, Moscow
- 1967 и 1968 – Exhibition "Artists-Journalists", Moscow
- 1969 – Exhibition On Guard of the Motherland, Moscow
- 1970 – Republican art exhibition Soviet Russia, Moscow
- 1970 – Personal exhibition (Petersburg Tales by N. Gogol, The Idiot by F. Dostoevsky, beginning of the Dialogues series), Bucharest, Constanta
- 1971 – Solo Exhibition (Gogol, Dostoevsky), Prague, Bratislava, Banská Bystrica
- 1971 – International Exhibition Books for Six Years (1965–1971) IBA, Leipzig
- 1972 – Exhibition of Soviet children's book illustrations, Munich
- 1973 – Personal exhibition, Moscow
- 1974 – Personal exhibition, Moscow
- 1975 – Personal exhibition (from military series, Pushkin, portraits of friends, Moscow and Muscovites), Moscow
- 1975 – Personal exhibition from the series Abramtsevo, Abramtsevo
- 1976 – All-Union Art Exhibition "Glory to Labour", Moscow
- 1976 – Personal exhibition (Gogol's Dead Souls), Moscow
- 1977 – All-Union exhibition Soviet Portrait, Moscow

Contemporary exhibitions

- 2010 – Exhibition dedicated to the 100th anniversary of the artist's birth, Samara Regional Art Museum, Samara
- 2010' – Vitaly Goryaev: Half a Century in Art (as part of the festival of the same name), Kurgan Regional Art Museum, Kurgan
- 2010 – Exhibition dedicated to the 100th anniversary of his birth, Russian Academy of Arts, Moscow
- 2012 – Life Line, Central House of Artist, Moscow
- 2012 – Vitaly Goryaev. Artist and War (war graphics, illustrations to famous post-war works, as well as watercolours of the war years), New Manege, Moscow
- 2017 – The Truth of Nudity (an exhibition of nude works by Goryaev, Semyon Chuikov and Nikolai Kuzmin), Abramtsevo Museum-Reserve

=== Books ===
Books illustrated by Vitaly Goryaev

Fiction

- Barto A. L. Swings (Качели). Детгиз, Мoscow – Leningrad, 1946.
- Barto A. L. The House Moved (Дом переехал). Детгиз, Мoscow – Leningrad, 1947.
- Barto A. L. Petya Draws (Петя рисует). Детгиз, 1954.
- Barto A. L. Redskins (Краснокожие). Детгиз, 1959.
- Barto A. L. If he needs you (Если вы ему нужны). – Мoscow: Дет. лит., 1988.
- Barto A. L. To the winter forest for flowers (За цветами в зимний лес). – Мoscow: Дет. лит., 1970.
- Barto A. L. Lyoshenka, Lyoshenka (Лёшенька, Лёшенька). – Мoscow:Дет. лит., 1965.
- Barto A. L. Down the lane, down the boulevard... (По дорожке, по бульвару…) — Мoscow: Дет. лит., 1967
- Barto A. L. Teenagers, teenagers… (Подростки, подростки…) — Мoscow: Дет. лит., 1980.
- Barto A. L. About the big and small (Про больших и про маленьких). – Мoscow: Сов. писатель, 1958.
- Barto A. L. Poems for kids (Стихи детям). In 2 vol. – Мoscow: Дет. лит., 1966, 1976.
- Berg L. Little Pete Stories (Маленькие рассказы про маленького Пита). Детгиз, 1956.
- Bershadsky R.Y., Khelemsky Y. A. Everything on one planet (Всё на одной планете). – Мoscow: Дет. лит., 1965.
- Gashek Y. Confessions of an Old Bachelor («Исповедь старого холостяка»), 1944 (Library of the magazine «Красноармеец», № 14/19).
- O’Henry. Short Stories («Рассказы»). Детгиз, 1948.
- Gogol N. V. Petersburg Tales (Петербургские повести). – Мoscow: Худож. лит., 1965.
- Dostoevsky F. M. The Idiot (Идиот). – Мoscow: Худож. лит., 1971.
- Dostoevsky F. M. The Adolescent (Подросток). – Мoscow: Худож. лит., 1986.
- Dragunsky V. He's alive and glowing (Он живой и светится). 1960.
- Dreiser Т. American Tragedy (Американская Трагедия) (publ. «Огонёк»), 1955.
- Dreiser Т. American Tragedy (Американская Трагедия). – Мoscow: Худож. лит., 1978.
- Kalma N. Children of mustard heaven (Дети горчичного рая). Детгиз, Мoscow – Leningrad, 1950.
- Kassis V. B. Outside the walls of the old fort (За стенами старого форта). – Мoscow: Просвещение, 1962.
- Kassis V. B. Rubber sprue (Каучуковый спрут). – Мoscow: Дет. лит., 1964.
- Kataev V. P. The Lonely White Sail (Белеет парус одинокий). Детгиз, 1954.
- Kataev V. P. The Lonely White Sail (Белеет парус одинокий). – Мoscow: Худож. лит., 1967.
- Kataev V. P. Waves of the Black Sea (Волны Чёрного моря). Vol. 1. – Мoscow: Детгиз, 1961.
- Kataev V. P. A farmstead in the steppe (Хуторок в степи). – Мoscow: Детгиз, 1956.
- Kim R. The Girl From Hiroshima (Девушка из Хиросимы). – Молодая гвардия, 1956.
- Larni M. The fourth vertebre (Четвёртый позвонок). Мoscow, 1959.
- Marshak S. True-untrue story (Быль-небылица). Детгиз. 1947.
- Mayakovsky V. A skyscraper dissected (Небоскрёб в разрезе). (Library of the magazine «Крокодил», 1948, №29).
- Mayakovsky V. What is good and what is bad (Что такое хорошо и что такое плохо). Детгиз, 1954.
- Mikhailov N. N., Kosenko Z. V. Americans: a travelling tale (Американцы: путевая повесть). — Мoscow: Сов. писатель, 1960.
- Nosov N. N. On the hill (На горке). Детгиз. 1951.
- Nosov N. N. Steps (Ступеньки). – Мoscow: Дет. лит., 1965.
- Olesha Y. K. The three fat men (Три толстяка). – Детгиз, 1951.
- Olesha Y. K. The three fat men (Три толстяка). – Мoscow: Дет. лит., 1969.
- Prokofyeva S. L. Adventures of the Yellow Suitcase (Приключения жёлтого чемоданчика). – Мoscow: Дет. лит., 1965.
- Sterling D. Mary Jane (Мэри Джейн). Transl. from Eng. – Мoscow: Дет. лит., 1964.
- Strelnikov B. G. How are you in America? (Как вы там, в Америке?) — Мoscow: Мол.гвардия, 1965.
- Twain М. Adventures of Tom Sawyer (Приключения Тома Сойера). – Детгиз, 1948; ГИХЛ, 1949; Дет. лит., 1965.
- Twain М. Adventures of Huckleberry Finn (Приключения Гекльберри Финна). Детгиз, 1948; ГИХЛ, 1949.
- Twain M. Adventures of Tom Sowyer; Adventures of Huckleberry Finn (Приключения Тома Сойера; Приключения Гекльберри Финна). — Мoscow: Правда, 1980.
- Twain M. Senator Dilworthy; The Stolen White Elephant; Goldsmith’s Friend Abroad Again, Letters I–IV; My Watch and other short stories (Сенатор Дильворти; Похищение белого слона; Письмо китайца; Мои часы; и др. Рассказы). «Избранное», vol. I and II, ГИХЛ, 1949.
- Tess T. N. American Women (Американки). – Мoscow: Дет. лит., 1966.
- Sherfig H. The Scorpion (Скорпион). Изд-во иностранной литературы, Мoscow, 1956.
- Ural: a monthly lit-artistic and social-political journal (Урал: ежемес. лит-худож. и общ.-полит. журн.). — Sverdlovsk: Сред.-Урал. кн. изд-во, 1986, — №12.

Collections of works

- Goryaev V. N. Illustrations to the works of F. M. Dostoevsky (Иллюстрации к произведениям Ф. М. Достоевского). – Мoscow: Сов.художник, 1971.
- Goryaev V. N. Ceylon: colonialism is becoming a thing of the past (Цейлон: колониализм уходит в прошлое)/ drawing and text by V. N. Goryaev. — Мoscow: Советский художник, 1962.
- V. Goryaev: Booklet (Буклет). — Мoscow: Советский художник, 1965. — 12 p.: ил.
- Vitaly Nikolayevich Goryaev: Exhibition in Prague: in a foreign language (Виталий Николаевич Горяев: Выставка в Праге: на ин. яз.) — Prague, 1971. — 8 p.: ил.
- Vitaly Goryaev. Graphic series: Pushkin. Gogol. Dostoevsky (Графические серии: Пушкин. Гоголь. Достоевский)/ Author — comp. and author В.Воронов. — Мoscow: Советский художник, 1979. — 83 ил.
- Vitaly Nikolayevich Goryaev (USSR): Cat. exhibition in Romanian language (Виталий Николаевич Горяев (СССР): Кат. выст.: на рум. Яз). — Бухарест, 1970. — 20 p.: ill. Горяев В. Н.
- Drawings (Рисунки). – Мoscow: Изд. «Крокодила»; 1961. — 48 p.: ill. — (Мастера советской карикатуры).

== Legacy ==
Goryaev's works are featured in several prestigious collections, including the Tretyakov Gallery, the Russian Museum, the Pushkin State Museum of Fine Arts, the State Literary Museum, the Museum of Russian Art in Harbin, and various art galleries in Odesa, Perm, Yekaterinburg, Kursk, and other cities. The Kurgan Regional Art Museum houses over 250 of Goryaev's works, generously donated by his widow, Taisia Lobach-Zhuchenko.

A home museum, organised by Sergei Goryaev, the artist and architect son of the late Goryaev Sr., presents a vast collection of paintings, caricatures, book and magazine graphics. The museum is located in house No. 7 on Begovaya Street, also known as the 'House of Artists on Begovaya' or the building of the Moscow Regional Union of Artists. Goryaev Sr. purchased the flat from the 1st Artists' Co-operative Society in 1957 and lived there until his passing. The studio he occupied from 1970 is also part of the museum. In the 1990s, the artist's son inherited his workshop and subsequently organised an exposition, which led to the opening of a museum in 1996. In 2012, he also initiated the installation of a memorial plaque on the house. The museum's collection comprises paintings, sketches, book graphics, archives, and the artist's personal art collection. Notably, it includes works by Pyotr Miturich, Dmitry Mitrohin, Mikhail Kupriyanov, Aleksandr Sokolov, Vladimir Konashevich, and a lithograph hand-painted in watercolour gifted by Pablo Picasso.

== Memory ==
- On 7 May 1985, Chernoozernaya Street, located in the Northern settlement of Kurgan, was named after the artist.
- A memorial plaque by N. B. Nikoghosyan was erected in 2012 on the house located at 7/9 Begovaya St. in Moscow, where V. N. Goryaev lived and worked from 1957 to 1982.
- A festival was held in the Kurgan region from March to June 2010 to commemorate the 100th anniversary of the birth of Vitaly Nikolayevich Goryaev, a People's Artist of the USSR.
- In 2010–2012, several anniversary exhibitions were held in Moscow, Kurgan, Samara, and Abramtsevo to commemorate Goryaev.
