= Aleksey Batalov =

Soviet and Russian actor, film director, screenwriter and pedagogue

- Алексей Баталов
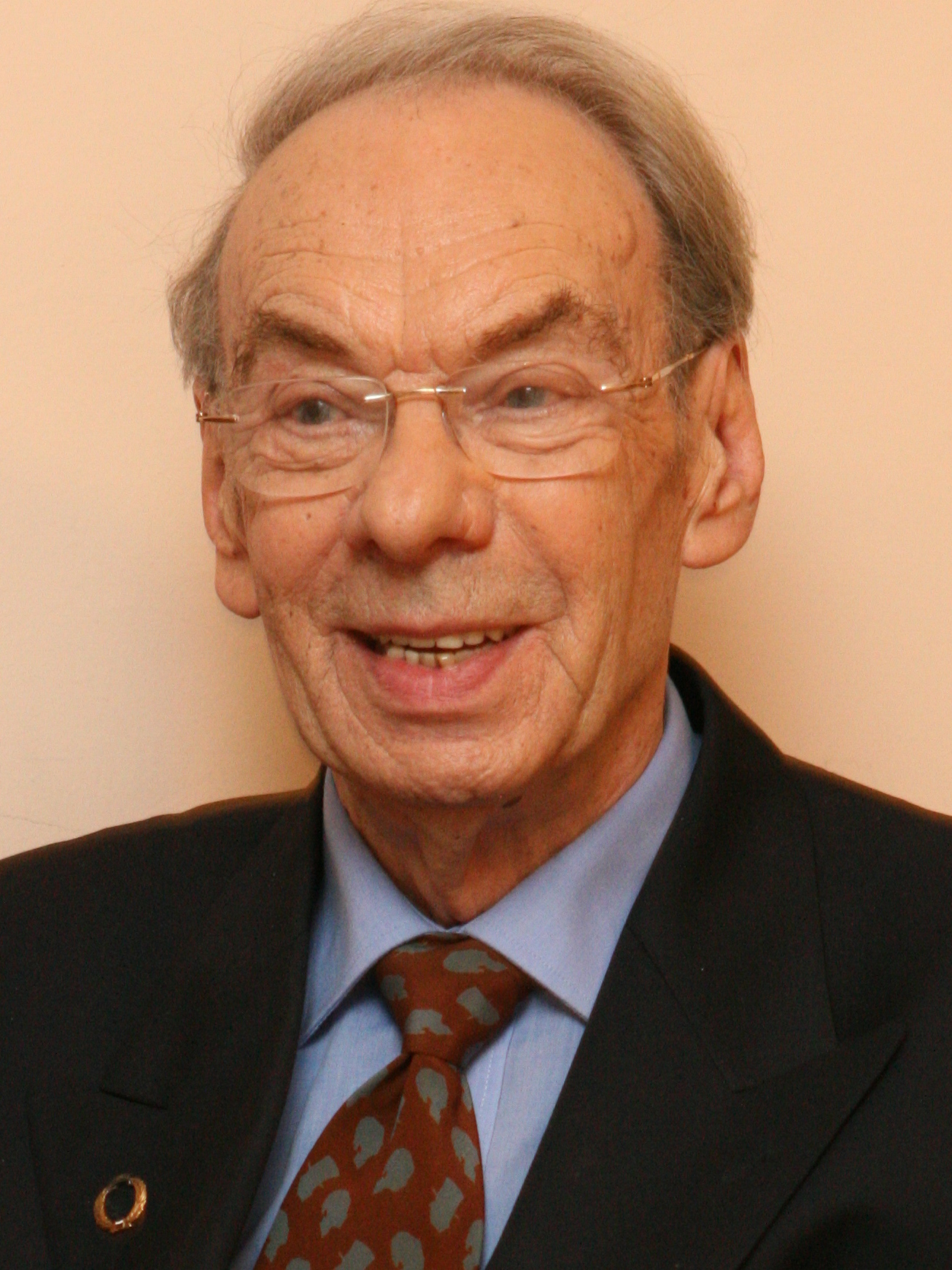
- Batalov in 2016
- Born: 20 November 1928; Vladimir, Russian SFSR, Soviet Union
- Died: 15 June 2017 (aged 88); Moscow, Russia
- Occupations: Actor, film director, screenwriter, pedagogue
- Spouse: Gitana Leontenko (m. 1963)

Aleksey Vladimirovich Batalov (Note: Russian: Алексей Владимирович Баталов, romanized: Aleksey Vladimirovich Batalov) (20 November 1928 – 15 June 2017) was a Soviet and Russian stage and film actor, film director, screenwriter, and pedagogue acclaimed for his portrayal of noble and positive characters. He was named a People's Artist of the USSR in 1976 and a Hero of Socialist Labour in 1989.

== Life and career ==
Batalov was born on 20 November 1928 in Vladimir, into a family associated with the theatre. His uncle Nikolai Batalov starred in Vsevolod Pudovkin's classic Mother (1926). The Modernist poet Anna Akhmatova was a family friend, and he painted a well-known portrait of her in 1952. Batalov joined the Moscow Art Theatre in 1953 but left three years later to concentrate on his career in film. During the Khrushchev Thaw he was one of the most recognizable actors in the Soviet Union. The Cranes Are Flying (1957) is his best-regarded film of the period, and the one which won the Palme d'Or at the Cannes Film Festival. He also starred in Mikhail Romm's Nine Days of One Year (1962). In 1967 he was a member of the jury of the 5th Moscow International Film Festival. In 1973 he was a member of the jury at the 8th Moscow International Film Festival.

During the 1960s and 1970s, Batalov became known for his fastidious approach towards choosing roles for himself. He appeared mostly in film adaptations of Russian classics, including Anton Chekhov's The Lady with the Dog (1960) and Bulgakov's The Flight (1970). He also directed screen versions of Gogol's The Overcoat (1960) and Yuri Olesha's Three Fat Men (1966). In the 1970s he concentrated on a professorship at the Gerasimov Institute of Cinematography.

In 1979, Batalov was invited to play Gosha, a mill machinist, in the melodrama Moscow Does Not Believe in Tears. After much hesitation, Batalov agreed to play his part in the movie, for which he won the USSR State Prize. The role was central to the film's Soviet message. As one character says in the picnic scene: "Seventy percent of my doctorate was due to Gosha's mechanical genius". After that, he effectively retired from acting and devoted his time to coaching new generations of film actors. Boris Yeltsin presented the Lifetime Achievement Nika Award to him in 2002. Batalov was awarded the State Prize of the Russian Federation (2005).

In 2007, he received a Lifetime Achievement Award at the 29th Moscow International Film Festival.

In March 2014, he signed a letter in support of the position of the President of Russia Vladimir Putin on Russia's military intervention in Ukraine.

== Death ==
Batalov died on 15 June 2017 in Moscow from complications of a fall, which resulted in a hip fracture, at the age of 88.

== Honours and awards ==
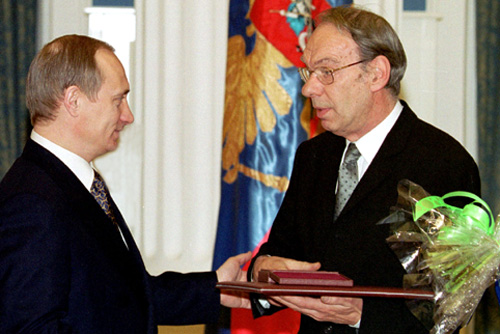
With Vladimir Putin, 1 March 2000

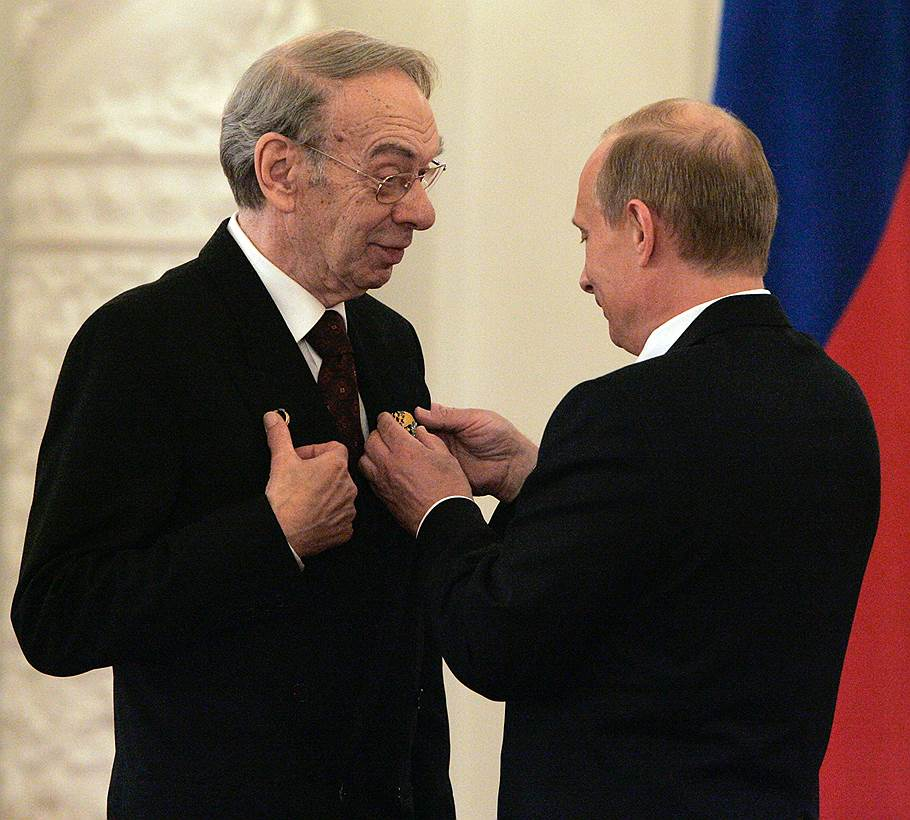
Russian President Vladimir Putin awarded on 2005 State Prize, 12 June 2006

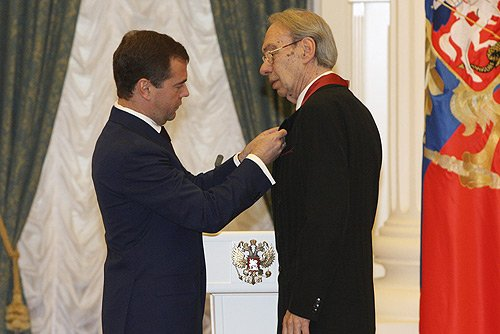
Russian President Dmitry Medvedev awarded of the Order "For Merit to the Fatherland", 2nd class, 23 December 2008

Awards of Russia and the USSR

- Hero of Socialist Labour (1989)
- Order "For Merit to the Fatherland":
  - 2nd class (20 November 2008) – for outstanding contribution to the development of national culture, for his many years of creative and educational activities
  - 3rd class (10 November 1998) – for outstanding contributions to the development of national cinematography
- Vasilyev Brothers State Prize of the RSFSR (1966) – for his role in the movie Nine Days in One Year
- Two Orders of Lenin (1967, 1989)
- Lenin Komsomol Prize (1967)
- Honored Artist of the RSFSR (1964)
- People's Artist of the RSFSR (1969)
- People's Artist of the USSR (1976)
- USSR State Prize (1981) – for his role in the movie Moscow Does Not Believe in Tears
- State Prize of the Russian Federation (2005)
- Russian Presidential Prize in Literature and Art in 1999 (17 February 2000)

Foreign awards

- Order of St. Cyril and Methodius (Bulgaria)

Community Awards

- Order of Peter the Great (Academy of Security, Defence and Law Enforcement, 2003)
- Juno Award (1997)
- Idol Award (2002) – For high service to art
- Commemorative Medal for the 150th anniversary of Anton Chekhov, by the Moscow Art Theatre (2005)

== Filmography ==
=== Actor ===
- Zoya (Зоя, 1944) as Alyosha Batalov, Zoya's classmate (uncredited)
- A Big Family (1954) as Aleksey Ilich Zhurbin
- Mikhaylo Lomonosov (1955) as Muzhik
- Mother (1955) as Pavel Vlasov
- The Rumyantsev Case (Дело Румянцева, 1956) as Sasha Rumyantsev
- The Cranes Are Flying (1957) as Boris
- Dorogoy moy chelovek (1958)
- Shinel (1959) (uncredited)
- The Lady with the Dog (1960) as Dmitri Dmitrievich Gurov
- Nine Days of One Year (Девять дней одного года, 1962) as Dmitri Gusev
- A Day of Happiness (1963) as Alexander Nikolaevich Beryozkin
- Svet dalyokoy zvezdy (1965) as Lukashov
- Three Fat Men (1966) as Tibul
- V gorode S. (1967) as Shergov
- The Seventh Companion (Седьмой спутник, 1968) as commissar
- The Living Corpse (Живой труп, 1968) as Fyodor Protasov
- Vnimanie, cherepakha! (1970)
- The Flight (Бег, 1971) as Sergei Pavlovich Golubkov
- Vozvrata net (1974) as Aleksey Vladimirovich Yegorov
- A Very English Murder (1974) as Dr. Botwink
- Nezabytaya pesnya (1975) as Mikola
- The Captivating Star of Happiness (Звезда пленительного счастья, 1975) as Sergei Petrovich Trubetskoy
- Rikki-Tikki-Tavi (1979)
- Moscow Does Not Believe in Tears (Москва слезам не верит, 1980) as Georgy Ivanovich "Gosha"
- Speed (Скорость, 1983) as Igor Vladimirovich Lagutin
- O lyudyakh atomakh (1983)
- Time for rest from Saturday to Monday (Время отдыха с субботы до понедельника, 1984) as Pavel
- Dose cheloveka v 'Mersedese' (1986)
- Zontik dlya novobrachnykh (1987) as Dmitriy Pavlovich Kraskov
- Stalin's Funeral (Похороны Сталина, 1990) as Eugene's father
- Poltergeyst-90 (1991)
- ...Pervaya lyubov (1995) (voice)
- Rokovye yaytsa (1996)
- Malenkaya printsessa (1997)
- Karnavalnaya noch 2, ili 50 let spustya (2007) (final film role)

=== Director ===
- The Overcoat (1959)
- Three Fat Men (1966)
- The Gambler (1972)

=== Voice ===
- Hedgehog in the Fog (1975) as Narrator
- The Adventures of Lolo the Penguin (1988) as Narrator
