= Dubravka (film) =

- Russian: Дубравка
- Directed by: Radomir Vasilevsky
- Written by: Yuri Chulyukin; Radij Pogodin
- Starring: Lina Braknyte; Nijolė Vikiraitė; Vitali Fadeyev
- Cinematography: Vasili Kirbizhekov; Nikolai Lekanev
- Music by: Eduard Lazarev
- Release date: 1967
- Running time: 80 minute
- Country: Soviet Union
- Language: Russian

Dubravka (Russian: Дубравка) is a 1967 Soviet family film directed by Radomir Vasilevsky.

== Plot ==
The film centers on the emotional journey of Dubravka, a teenage girl navigating the turbulent transition from childhood to adolescence. Set against the backdrop of Crimea's picturesque Black Sea coast, Dubravka spends her days playing soccer, swimming, and racing with boys. However, as she begins to mature, she finds herself in a liminal space: uninterested in childish activities but still overlooked by older peers. Her attempts to fit in are met with indifference, as illustrated during a rehearsal of The Snow Queen, where she feels excluded by the older cast members.

Dubravka’s life takes a turn when Valentina Grigoryevna, a charming and beautiful woman, temporarily moves into her home. Mistaken by locals for a famous actress, Valentina is actually a textile engineer on vacation. Initially enamored with Valentina, Dubravka idolizes her, but tensions arise when Valentina forms a bond with Dubravka’s neighbor, Pyotr Petrovich, a single father of two. Jealous and hurt, Dubravka tells Valentina outrageous lies about Pyotr, including that he poisoned one of his former wives. Dubravka’s frustration deepens when Pyotr accidentally breaks a prized seashell she had painstakingly retrieved for Valentina. Overwhelmed by conflicting emotions, Dubravka struggles to reconcile her feelings of jealousy, admiration, and the desire for attention.

As the story unfolds, Dubravka learns the complexities of human relationships and the value of empathy. She resolves her conflicts, making peace with her rival "Iron," gaining mutual understanding with Pyotr, and realizing she unfairly hurt Valentina. In the film's closing scenes, Dubravka bids farewell to friends leaving for Leningrad and promises to share Valentina's address with Pyotr, symbolizing her growth and newfound emotional maturity.

== Cast ==
- Lina Braknyte as Dubravka
- Nijolė Vikiraitė as Valentina
- Vitali Fadeyev as Pyotr Petrovich
- Kostya Usatov as Seryozhka
- Olga Anikina as Natashka
- Georgi Slabinyak as Ilya Fomich
- Sergey Tikhonov as Utyug
- Misha Chernysh as Zelyonka
- Alla Vitruk as Snow Queen
