= Izabelė Pinaitytė =

Lithuanian film ediror (born 1930)

Izabelė Pinaitytė (born March 2, 1930) is a Lithuanian film editor.

In 1959, she graduated from the Vincas Kapsukas State University (now Vilnius University), faculty of history and philology. Since 1958 she has worked as a film editor.

In 2016, at the Silver Crane awards, she received the "Golden Crane" statuette for lifetime achievements in Lithuanian cinema.

== Selected filmography ==
- 1960: Novella Mums nebereikia [We Don't Need It Anymore] in the film Gyvieji didvyriai [Living Heroes], the first work.
- 1962: Žingsniai naktį
- 1965: Nobody Wanted to Die
- 1964: The Girl and the Echo
- 1969: Ave, Vita
- 1974: Žvangutis
