= Envy (novel) =

1927 novel by Yury Olesha

- First English edition (cover by V. Kozlinsky, 1936)
- Author: Yury Olesha
- Original title: Зависть
- Language: Russian
- Genre: Satirical novel
- Publisher: Krasnaya Nov
- Publication date: 1927
- Publication place: Soviet Union

Envy (Russian: Зависть, romanized: Zavist') is a satirical novel by the Russian writer Yury Olesha, first published in 1927.

== Plot summary ==
The novel is about a pathetic young man named Nikolai Kavalerov, who refuses to accept Communist values and is consumed by loathing and envy for his benefactor Andrei Babichev, a model Soviet citizen who manages a successful sausage factory. With Andrei Babichev's brother Ivan, Kavalerov attempts to stage a comeback of all the old, petty feelings that were crushed under communism. In the end, Ivan and Kavalerov are crushed by their own iniquity.

== Background ==
Envy first appeared in Krasnaya Nov, a Soviet literary magazine, in late 1927. Olesha wrote the novel while working at the Gudok, a widely read newspaper of the Railway Workers' Union. Other authors of the newspaper were Mikhail Bulgakov, Isaac Babel, Ilya Ilf, and Yevgeny Petrov.

== Style ==
Encyclopædia Britannica calls Envy "a satire in the tradition of Notes from the Underground".

== Themes ==
The central social theme of Envy is the fate of the intelligentsia in Russia's postrevolutionary society. The novel presents a clash between the rational industrial state and the creative aspirations of Nikolay Kavalerov, which results with Kavalerov throwing his potential away. Despite Olesha's enthusiasm for the new state of affairs, Envy is one of a number of 20th-century Russian novels in which the protagonists clash with Soviet reality and as a result find themselves marginalized.

== English translations ==
- MacAndrew, Andrew R., and Yuri Olesha. Envy and Other Works. Doubleday & Co.
- Olesha, Yuri. Envy. Trans. Marian Schwartz. New York Review of Books, 2004
