= Lina Braknytė =

Lithuanian actress

Lina Braknytė (19 October 1952, Vilnius) is a Lithuanian actress. She was voted the Best Actress in the republican film festival in 1967. She retired after several films and became Lina Paknienė after marriage.

== Life ==
She played several roles during the Soviet era, from 1964 to 1972. She became famous after her premiere in the lead role in the 1964 movie The Girl and the Echo. In Lithuanian, it is known as The Last Day of Vacations. The movie, based on a story by Yuri Nagibin, depicts a young girl Vika enjoying the last days of summer vacations in a sea resort somewhere in the south. A scene where she is depicted swimming nude was criticized by teachers from Klaipėda who requested city officials to forbid its distribution.

For her role in Dubravka, Braknytė was awarded the Best Actress in the republican film festival in 1967.

After graduating from high school, Lina graduated from the Faculty of History, Vilnius University, worked as a librarian, and never acted again.

She married Lithuanian photographer Raimondas Paknys. They have a daughter (named Vika, after her role in the film The Girl and the Echo) and a grandson.

== Filmography ==
- 1964 - The Girl and the Echo (Девочка и эхо; Lithuanian title: Paskutinė atostogų diena (The Last Day of Vacations))
- 1965 - Two in Love (Двое)
- 1966 - Three Fat Men (Три толстяка)
  In the film she played a girl acrobat Tutti impersonating the living doll Suok of the ruler's heir
- 1967 - Dubravka (Дубравка)
- 1971 - The Sea of Our Hope (Море нашей надежды)
- 1972 - The Last Fort (Последний форт)
- 1978 - I want to Be an Actor... (Noriu būti artistu...)
  A documentary by Arūnas Žebriūnas about young Lithuanian actors. Lina played herself (a history student).
