= The Girl and the Echo =

- Directed by: Arūnas_Žebriūnas
- Starring: Lina Braknytė; Valery Zubarev; Bronius Babkauskas
- Cinematography: Jonas Gricius
- Edited by: Izabelė Pinaitytė
- Production companies: Lithuanian Film Studios, Lenfilm (dubbing into Russian)
- Release date: December 28, 1964
- Running time: 59 minutes
- Country: Soviet Union
- Languages: Lithuanian; Russian

The Girl and the Echo (Russian: Девочка и эхо, romanized: Devochka i ekho; original title: The Last Day of Vacation, Lithuanian: Paskutinė atostogų diena) is a 1964 Soviet romantic drama film directed by Arūnas Žebriūnas and produced by Lithuanian Film Studios. It is based on a short story Echo by Yury Nagibin, who also wrote the screenplay.

== Plot ==
Vika is staying for the last day at her grandfather's, a fisherman. Today her father should come but she does not want to leave. In the morning her grandfather goes to sea to check the nets and Vika wanders along the beach and talks with her rocks-friends. The pensive girl creates a special world of relationships with people and nature.

Meanwhile, on the bank the children from the coastal village decide who should be the leader in their crew. Vika proclaims that the ringleader is cheating his friends: he has hidden the marked crab which the next leader should catch in the sea amongst the rocks and has thrown an unmarked one into the sea. Vika takes the crab from its hiding place and reveals the deception. Here on the shore she meets Roman. He has arrived at the coast only for one day and does not know anyone. Vika sees him as her friend and in secret tells Roman about her amazing collection – the diverse echoing voices in the rocks.

However, when the leader decides to take revenge on Vika and hides her dress during her bath, Roman gets into a situation where he has to pass a test on friendship. Because of the guys ridicule, Roman chickens out and does not deliver dress to Vika who is sitting naked in the water. Vika passes through the formation of the boys herself to pick up the dress and throws into the boy's face the worst thing that he can hear, – the accusation of cowardice. To justify himself against the charge of cowardice and to win the trust of the new clique, Roman leads them into the rocks and boasts of the secret received from the girl. But the echo is silent. Vika's father arrives and meets crying Roman – he was nearly beaten for his lie. But their joint efforts to initiate the echo also do not lead to success.

However, the girl is also suffering from his betrayal. In a purely childish way she restores her confidence in humanity by calling from a village telephone random phone numbers and wishing strange interlocutors health and to have a good day.

Before leaving, Vika makes her father promise that they will come back here next year. Roman, experiencing a quarrel with Vika, tries by all means to prove that he is not a coward, and gets a marked crab, rushing to the sea waves. He brings the crab to Vika insisting that he is not a coward, and that now he will be the leader but Vika does not forgive his betrayal.

== Casting ==
- Lina Braknytė - Vika
- Valery Zubarev - Roman
- Bronius Babkauskas - Vika's father
- Kaarel Karm - Vika's grandfather

== Production ==
At the age of 11, Lina Braknytė was not so embarrassed to have to shoot a scene where she was swimming completely naked, but after the film was released, the young actress had a hard time. "I was teased at school. In the first days I had to sit in the toilet at every break. Only after two weeks everything was somehow calmed down", she said.

== Awards ==
- Special Prize of the Jury of the XVIII Locarno International Film Festival "Majority's Silver Sail" (1965).
