= Speed (1983 film) =

- Russian: Скорость
- Directed by: Dmitry Svetozarov
- Written by: V. Musakhanov; Mariya Zvereva
- Starring: Aleksey Batalov; Dmitriy Kharatyan; Merle Talvik; Vsevolod Shilovskiy; Angelina Stepanova
- Cinematography: Sergey Astakhov
- Music by: Vladimir Deshov; Aleksandr Kutikov; Andrey Makarevich; Aleksandr Zajtsev
- Production company: Lenfilm Studio
- Release date: 1983
- Running time: 93 minutes
- Country: Soviet Union
- Language: Russian

Speed (Russian: Скорость) is a 1983 Soviet sports drama film directed by Dmitry Svetozarov.

== Plot ==
Unknown Grigory Yakovlev suddenly overtook top racers in racing car competitions and as a result was invited to the laboratory of the head of the design bureau.

== Cast ==
- Aleksey Batalov as Igor Vladimirovich Lagutin
- Dmitry Kharatyan as Grigory Yakovlev
- Merle Talvik as Krista Tammet
- Vsevolod Shilovskiy as Sergey Trofimovich Levko
- Angelina Stepanova as Elizaveta Alekseyevna
- Baadur Tsuladze as Guram
- Yevgeniya Polyakova
- Olga Vikladt
- Gennadiy Bogachyov
- Viktor Mikhaylov
