= Jonas Gricius =

Lithuanian cinematographer (1928–2021)

Jonas Augustino Gricius (5 August 1928 – 1 February 2021) was a Lithuanian cinematographer, known for his work on a number of classical films starting from the late 1950s, including Hamlet, The Girl and the Echo, and The Blue Bird.

== Biography ==
In 1954 he graduated from the All-Union Institute of Cinematography, a course by Boris Volchek. He worked at the film studio Lenfilm, as an assistant to director Andrei Moskvin. Since 1958 – Operator of the Lithuanian Film Studio (LKS). Secretary of the LSSR Cinematographers' Union (1963–1968), chairman (1981–1988). Director of the Lithuanian Film Studio (1978–1989). Gricius died on 1 February 2021, at the age of 92.
