= The Blue Bird (1976 film) =

1976 film by George Cukor

- Theatrical film poster
- Directed by: George Cukor
- Written by: Aleksei Kapler; Lyrics by Tony Harrison
- Screenplay by: Hugh Whitemore; Alfred Hayes
- Story by: Irina Golovanj; Irina Tarsanova
- Based on: The Blue Bird; 1908 play by Maurice Maeterlinck
- Produced by: Paul Maslansky
- Starring: Elizabeth Taylor; Jane Fonda; Cicely Tyson; Will Geer; Todd Lookinland; Patsy Kensit; Nadezhda Pavlova; Ava Gardner
- Cinematography: Jonas Gricius; Freddie Young
- Edited by: Stanford C. Allen; Tatyana Shapiro
- Music by: Irwin Kostal; Andrey Petrov
- Production company: Lenfilm
- Distributed by: Twentieth Century-Fox Film Corporation
- Release date: April 5, 1976
- Running time: 99 minutes
- Countries: United States; Soviet Union
- Languages: English; Russian
- Budget: $12 million
- Box office: $3.5 million (US/ Canada)

The Blue Bird is a 1976 American-Soviet children's fantasy film directed by George Cukor. The screenplay by Hugh Whitemore, Alfred Hayes, and Aleksei Kapler is based on the 1908 play L'Oiseau bleu by Maurice Maeterlinck. It was the fifth screen adaptation of the play, following two silent films, the 1940 version starring Shirley Temple, and a 1970 animated feature. It was famous as one of the few cinematic co-productions between the United States and the Soviet Union during the Cold War. However, unlike prior adaptations, the film received little-to-no critical praise and was a flop at the box office.

== Plot ==
Mytyl and her brother Tyltyl are peasant children who are led on a quest for the Blue Bird of Happiness by the Queen of Light. She gives them a hat with a magic diamond that allows them to call forth the souls of all things, both living and inanimate.

On their journey, they are accompanied by the human personifications of a dog, a cat, water, sugar, bread, milk, and fire. They visit the kingdoms of the past and future and the queendoms of night and luxury, absorbing more wisdom at each place. Eventually, they discover that the blue bird they have been seeking has been in their own backyard all along.

== Cast ==
- Elizabeth Taylor as Queen of Light/Mother/Witch/Maternal Love
- Jane Fonda as Night
- Ava Gardner as Luxury
- Cicely Tyson as Tylette, the Cat
- Robert Morley as Father Time
- Leonid Nevedomsky as Father
- Harry Andrews as The Oak
- Todd Lookinland as Tyltyl
- Patsy Kensit as Mytyl
- Will Geer as Grandfather
- Mona Washbourne as Grandmother
- George Cole as Tylo, the Dog
- Richard Pearson as Bread
- Georgy Vitsin as Sugar
- Margarita Terekhova as Milk
- Valentina Ganibalova as Water
- Yevgeny Shcherbakov as Fire
- Nadezhda Pavlova as The Blue Bird
- Grant Bardsley as Little Blue Brother
- Oleg Popov as Clown

== Production ==
Edward Lewis optioned the film rights to The Blue Bird in 1968 and worked with Tower International to try to secure a co-production with the Soviet Union through a cultural exchange program in the United Kingdom. In 1974, Lewis reached an agreement with Lenfilm to create an international co-production co-written by Alfred Hayes and Aleksei Kapler. Lewis initially hired Arthur Penn to direct, but Soviet authorities deemed him "too liberal" and as a compromise George Cukor was hired as a "non-political" American director. Lewis convinced the Soviet studios to co-produce the film with the promise that Marlon Brando would be cast in a role, but this never materialized. Katharine Hepburn and Shirley MacLaine initially were signed to star, but both dropped out of the production before shooting began. Taylor approached David Bowie to star in the film but he turned it down.

The film was shot on location in Moscow and Leningrad. At times, both work and living conditions bordered on the primitive, and the non-Russian cast found it difficult to cope with the severe weather and mostly inedible food. James Coco, originally cast as Tylo, could digest only bread and butter and eventually suffered a gall bladder attack that necessitated his being replaced, and Elizabeth Taylor dealt with amoebic dysentery throughout filming. After viewing her appearance in the first week's dailies, Taylor flew to London and demanded that the director of cinematography Jonas Gricius, a Soviet Lithuanian cinematographer who was inexperienced in shooting with color film, be replaced. All of Taylor's scenes were reshot in post-production. Gricius became a member of the second unit crew while Freddie Young became the cinematographer. Communication between the English and Russian-speaking crews was nearly impossible, and George Cukor frequently resorted to sign language in a feeble effort to make himself understood. According to Cukor, Jane Fonda "was grim when she arrived but soon relaxed." He encountered more difficulties with Cicely Tyson, whom he accused of trying to jinx the production by casting voodoo spells on the set. When these issues caused the production to be delayed by a month, 20th Century Fox replaced Lewis with Paul Maslansky, who had experiences filming in the Soviet Union from The Red Tent and spoke Russian, as producer. Principal photography took place from January 20 to August 11, 1975. Taylor spent $8,000 buying additional costumes for her roles.

== Critical reception ==
The film premiered at the John F. Kennedy Center for the Performing Arts in Washington D.C., on May 5, 1976.

Vincent Canby of The New York Times described the film as "two films that want to compete but don't, everyone being polite, accepting compromise, effectively neutered. One of these films is blandly American, like the sort of processed cheese sold in jars that can later be used as water glasses. The other is dimly Russian but without any real Russian character, except for the sets, which aren't great. They look like stuff left over from the Bolshoi Opera's last road tour...Spectacle for spectacle's sake no longer is the rage in this country. It can still work sometimes if it's put on a large patch of ice, but the romantic notions that motivate The Blue Bird are enough to send most American children, to say nothing of the ancients who may accompany them to the film, into antisocial states beginning with catatonia and ending in armed rebellion...Mr. Cukor...seems to have had less chance to direct in this case than to act as the goodwill ambassador who got his actors on and off the sets on time...None of the English-speaking actors can do much but behave as if he was in a very unlikely pageant...The Soviet cast members, who speak in badly dubbed English, are no better except when they are given a chance to dance."

Variety wrote "Nobody's going to laugh in ridicule at any of it (it's that good) but nobody's going to be strongly moved (it's that bad)."

Time Out New York called the film "a desperately pedestrian, hideously glitzy version of Maeterlinck's delicate fantasy" and added, "You'd never believe in a month of Sundays that Cukor directed it."

Gene Siskel of the Chicago Tribune gave the film one star out of four and said that its production problems "show on the screen. Elizabeth Taylor has never looked uglier than she does portraying the spirit of light. She wears a '50s-spangled gown topped by a lava-like tiara. The Russians in the cast appear as interlopers, their speeches badly dubbed. The two starring children are as disingenuous as most movie children. Artistically grotesque moments abound. The film couldn't have its heart in a more right place, but what's up on the screen make this "The Blue Bird" one of unhappiness."

== Awards and nominations ==
The film was nominated for the Saturn Award for Best Fantasy Film but lost to The Holes.

== See also ==
- The Blue Bird, a 1940 children's film, also released by 20th Century Fox and also based on Maurice Maeterlinck's play.

== Works cited ==
- Medved, Harry; Medved, Michael (1984). The Hollywood Hall of Shame: The Most Expensive Flops in Movie History. Angus & Robertson. ISBN 0207149291.
