= Three Fat Men (film) =

- Directed by: Aleksey Batalov; Iosif Shapiro
- Written by: Aleksey Batalov; Mikhail Olshevsky
- Based on: Three Fat Men by Yury Olesha
- Starring: Lina Braknytė; Pyotr Artemyev; Aleksey Batalov; Valentin Nikulin
- Music by: Nikolai Sidelnikov
- Production company: Lenfilm
- Release date: 18 November 1966
- Running time: 85 minutes
- Country: Soviet Union
- Language: Russian

Three Fat Men (Russian: Три толстяка, romanized: Tri tolstyaka) is a 1966 Soviet children's fantasy film directed by Aleksey Batalov and Iosif Shapiro based on the eponymous novel by Yury Olesha.

== Plot ==
The story is set in an unnamed, fantastical city ruled by the Three Fat Men, who mercilessly exploit the people. A traveling caravan of performers, including the clown Augustus, the acrobat Tibul, and the young girl Suok, arrives in the city just as a miners' uprising erupts. Tibul joins the rebels, but their revolt is crushed by the forces of General Karaska. During the bombardment from the palace, a mishap damages the mechanical doll of the heir, Tutti—a lifelike toy resembling a young girl. Meanwhile, the rebel leader Prospero is captured and brought to the palace as part of a victory celebration.

While evading soldiers, Tibul seeks refuge in the home of the renowned scientist Dr. Gaspard Arneri, who helps him disguise himself. That same night, Dr. Arneri is summoned to the palace to repair the damaged doll and is sent home with it under heavy guard. However, the rebels ambush the carriage, mistaking the doctor for a high-ranking official, and the horses bolt with the carriage and the doll. Searching for the lost doll, Dr. Arneri stumbles upon Augustus’s caravan and reunites with Tibul. It is discovered that Suok bears an uncanny resemblance to the doll, and Tibul devises a plan: Suok will impersonate the doll to infiltrate the palace. Suok, posing as the repaired doll, is delivered to Tutti’s chambers, where the lonely boy discovers her secret but chooses not to expose her. Suok retrieves the key to the royal prison and frees Prospero, but her deception is revealed when the real doll is found elsewhere. Suok and Dr. Arneri are arrested and sentenced to execution.

As the execution looms, Tibul and the rebels infiltrate the palace through an underground passage, sparking a second uprising that overthrows the Three Fat Men. Tutti, defending Suok, is injured and learns that he has a real heart, not a mechanical one as he had been told. Suok and Dr. Arneri are freed, and the performers give a grand concert in the city square to celebrate the rebellion’s victory. In the end, the performers depart in their caravan, with Tutti joining them for a new life on the road.

== Cast ==
- Lina Braknytė as Suok (in some scenes voiced by Alisa Freindlich)
- Pyotr Artemyev as Tutti
- Aleksey Batalov as Tibul
- Valentin Nikulin as Gaspar
- Aleksandr Orlov as August
- Rina Zelyonaya as Ganimed
- Roman Filippov as Prospero
- Sergei Kulagin as Fat Man #1
- Yevgeny Morgunov as Fat Man #2
- Boris Khristoforov as Fat Man #3
- Pavel Luspekayev as Gen. Karaska (half-voiced by Grigory Gai)
- Boris Ardov as Capt. Bonaventura
- Nikolai Valyano as Chancellor (voiced by Nikolay Trofimov)
- Nikolai Kornoukhov as balloon seller
- Viktor Sergachyov as Razdvatris
- Andrei Kostrichkin as Fat Men's courtier
- Aleksei Smirnov as Fat Men's confectioner
- Irina Zarubina as Razdvatris' accompanist (uncredited)
- Valeri Zolotukhin as regiment officer (uncredited)
