= Nadezhda Pavlova =

Soviet and Russian ballet dancer (born 1956)

- Надежда Павлова
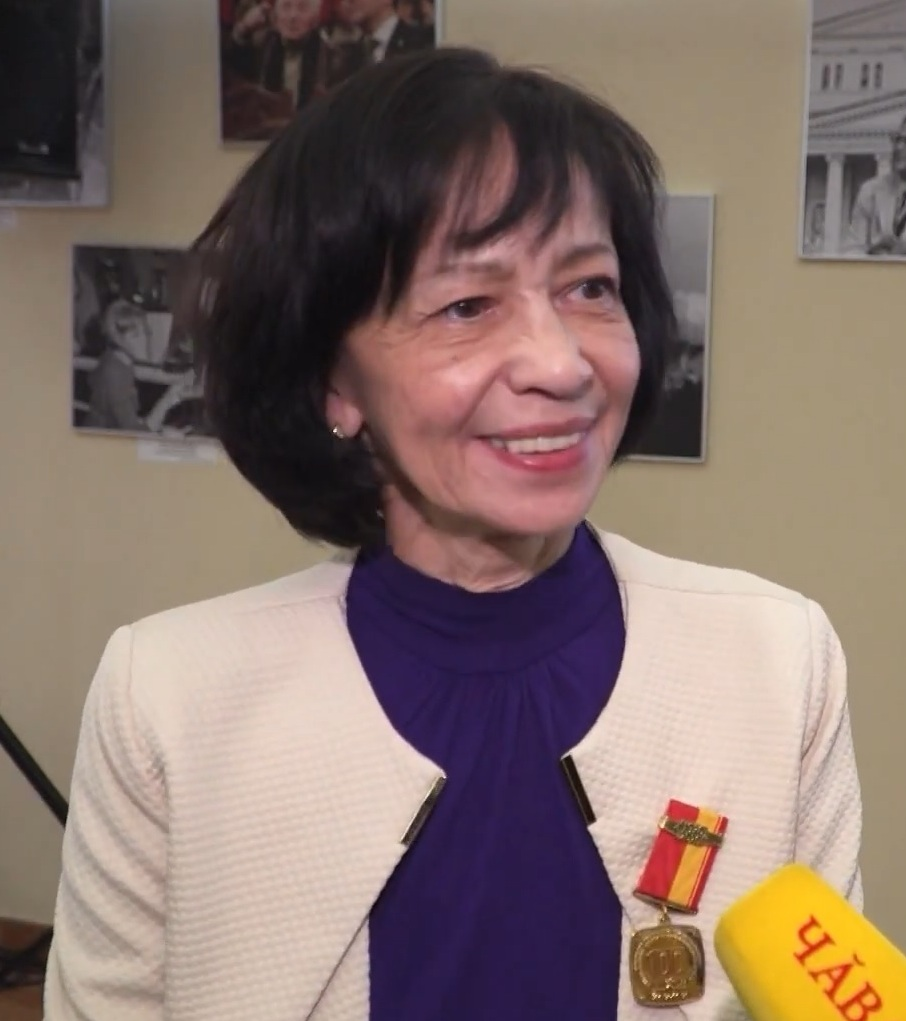
- Pavlova in 2021
- Born: 15 May 1956; Cheboksary, RSFSR, Soviet Union
- Occupation: Ballerina

Nadezhda Vasilyevna Pavlova (Russian: Надежда Васильевна Павлова; born 15 May 1956) is a Soviet and Russian ballet dancer. People's Artist of the USSR (1984).

== Life and artistic output ==
Nadia Pavlova liked to dance from an early age. At 7 she began to dance with a group at the House of Pioneers.

In 1966, visitors from the Perm State Choreographic College arrived in Cheboksary tasked with finding children of exceptional talent. They saw Nadia and recommended that she study in Perm, where she spent the next seven years — from 2nd year until graduation, in particular being coached by Lyudmila Pavlovna Sakharova.

From the 2nd year Nadia Pavlova participated in concerts with the special numbers choreographed by Marat Gaziev — «The Girl and an Echo», «The Little Ballerina», "Mischievous person", and also was cast in various children's parts at the Perm Opera and Ballet Theatre.

In 1970, during theater tours in Moscow, Nadia Pavlova was already noticed by reviewers. Aged 15 years was awarded the first prize in the All-Union competition of ballet masters and ballet dancers, and a year later, in 1973, she won the Grand prize of II International competition of ballet dancers in Moscow. Nadia Pavlova was already frequently touring, both at home and abroad, to countries including Italy, Japan, China, Austria, Germany, France and the United States.

After graduation she became a soloist at the Perm Academic Opera and Ballet Theater of P. I. Tchaikovsky, where she was given roles including Giselle (staged by B. Shcherbinin) and Juliet (Romeo and Juliet, ballet master N. Boyarchikov).

She joined the Bolshoi Ballet in 1975. In 1976 she danced the title role in George Cukor’s Soviet–American film The Blue Bird. Her regular partner throughout the decade was Vyacheslav Gordeyev, whom she married. She was taught by Asaf Messerer and coached by Marina Semyonova.

Since 1983 Nadia Pavlova's repertoire has included solos by Maurice Béjart and George Balanchine, and she danced with the leading soloists of the Bolshoi, including Aleksander Bogatyryov, Valery Anisimov, and later Aleksey Fadeyechev, Yury Vasyuchenko, Irek Mukhamedov and Nikolay Tsiskaridze. She retired from the Bolshoi in 1998 after taking part in 3-5 performances a season there for the previous 4 years. She has given master-classes in France, Germany, Japan, Finland.

From 1992 to 1994 Pavlova was the artistic director of Theatre of Pavlova's ballet, and in 1995 the Renaissance-ballet. She has also served as a member of the jury in international dance competitions in Luxembourg (1995) and Hong Kong (1996).

In 1999, Pavlova took part in the opening of the Russian cultural center in Washington, as well as being a laureate of the Stars of World Ballet Festival in Donetsk.

Starting 2013 she coaches leading soloists in the Bolshoi Theater, and also teaches in the Russian Academy of Theatrical Art (RATA). She lives in Moscow.

== Honors and awards ==
- Lenin Komsomol Prize (1975)
- Order of the Badge of Honour (1976)
- Honored Artist of the RSFSR (1977)
- People's Artist of the RSFSR (1982)
- People's Artist of the USSR (1984)

=== Photo-albums ===
- «Танцует Надежда Павлова», text A.Avdeenko, Perm, 1986.
- J. Gregory Giselle immortal: the story of Giselle as performed by Nadia Pavlova and Yuri Soloviev", London, 1982.

== See also ==
- List of Russian ballet dancers

== Literature ==
- С. Коробков «Путь в большой балет. Семь уроков в Пермском хореографическом училище». — Perm, 1989;
- Э. Бочарникова, Г. Иноземцева «Тем, кто любит балет», Moscow, 1988;
- А. Мессерер «Танец. Мысль. Время», Moscow, 1990;
- A. Demidov The Russian ballet: past & present. N.Y., 1977; London, 1982;
- S. Montague The ballerina, N.Y., 1980.
- М. Железкова «Надежда Павлова», Cheboksary, 1985, 1988.
