= The Three Fat Men =

1924/1928 fairy tale by Yuri Olesha

Three Fat Men (Три Толстяка, "Tri Tolstiaka") is a Russian and Soviet children's story written by Yury Olesha in 1924, published 1928. The book tells the story of a revolution led by the poor against the rich (Fat Men) in a fictional country. This country is described in a realistic spirit, without magic and fairy-tale creatures, but some fantastic elements are still present. It was considered the first revolutionary fairy tale in Soviet literature for its depiction of a popular uprising against a corrupt government. Early critical reaction was varied, with V. Boichevsky describing it as a "sugarcoated" presentation of revolution in an article "How Stories For Children Should Not Be". Anatoly Lunacharsky, however, saw in it "heart-felt apologetics by the artistic intelligentsia accepting the revolution".

Konstantin Stanislavki and the Moscow Art Theatre premiered a dramatic version of the story in May 1930. A ballet version with music by V. Oransky was presented in 1935. It has also been turned into an opera (composer, V. Rubin, 1956), a film, cartoon movies, diafilm (filmstrip), several comic versions, several radio versions, and a computer game.

== Plot ==
The events occur at an unnamed country on the brink of revolution. The power in the state is held by the Three Fat Men, wealthy oligarchs with monopoly on the state's natural resources. A long brewing resistance by the poor is led by two men: Prospero the Gunsmith and Tibul the Acrobat. Clashes between the rebels and the guard of the Three Fat Men break out every now and then. During a major confrontation with the government's forces, Prospero is captured, put in a cage in a menagerie, and is scheduled for execution. However, at the same time, guardsmen defectors wreck the doll of Tutti, the designated heir of the Fat Men. The doll is a marvelous creation, capable of singing, dancing, and looks like a real girl, even growing up like one. The Fat Men summon a famous scholar, Doctor Gaspar Arnery, and order him to fix the doll before the next day. The Doctor, unknown to them, is a sympathizer for the resistance, and had helped Tibul escape pursuit by the army, by hiding the Acrobat Tibul in his house and, using a washable solution, repainting him as a black man for temporary camouflage.

Gaspar attempts to repair the doll, but finds out it's impossible to do in less than three days. While going to the palace to report the bad news, he loses the doll along the way. The search for the doll leads him to a van of traveling artists, where he encounters Suok, a young girl who looks exactly like the broken doll, and convinces her to cooperate with him (with help from Tibul, also a member of the circus troupe). Moreover, the doctor, having agreed with Suok, demonstrates to the Fat Men that the doll will die irrevocably if they do not cancel the execution of the captured rebels, and the execution is canceled so as not to upset Tutti with the death of the doll.

Suok manages to get the key to Prospero's cage from Tutti, to whom it was entrusted by the Fat Men. When she goes to release him during the night, she is spoken to by another prisoner, a fur-covered humanoid creature. The prisoner calls her by name and passes her a note before dying. Prospero and Suok try to escape from the palace. The gunsmith succeeds, but Suok does not. She is arrested and sentenced to death. To prevent Tutti from interfering with the execution of the false doll with his crying, special agents put the boy to sleep for several days with a sleeping pill. Nevertheless, everything works out well for the brave girl and the revolutionaries: the guards, who went over to the side of the people, replace the girl with the doll they found just before the execution.

This time, the uprising is successful. Once it is over, Tutti and Suok appear before the people and read out the note given by the prisoner. He was once a man named Toub, a great scholar on par with Arnery, who made the doll for Tutti at the Three Fat Men's order, to replace Suok, who was his twin sister. Suok was sold to the circus. Then the Fat Men demanded he replace Tutti's heart with an iron one (hoping it will make him grow up as cruel as them), and, once he refused, caged him. The eight years spent in the menagerie cage turned Toub into a creature resembling a wolf - fanged and completely covered in fur. After reading out the note, the twins perform together, becoming the circus performers Suok and Tutti.

== Characters ==
- Doctor Gaspar Arneri — an old scientist, the most famous in the country, sympathizes with the people.
- Tutti the Heir — a boy of 12 years old, the heir of the Three Fat Men, brother of Suok.
- Suok — a circus girl of 12 years old, partner of Tibul, sister of Tutti, good-natured and brave.
- Three Fat Men — the rulers of the country. Their names are not mentioned, in the novel they are called the First, Second and Third Fat Men.
- Prospero the Gunsmith — one of the leaders of the revolutionaries.
- Tibul the Acrobat — one of the leaders of the revolutionaries, an acrobat, a circus artist from the "Uncle Brizak's Carnival Wagon" troupe, the best gymnast in the country.
- Count Bonaventura — captain of the palace guard.
- One-Two-Three the Dancing Master — dance teacher, sympathizer of the Fatties.
- Blue-Eyed Guard — one of the rebel guards. Pretends to be loyal to the Three Fatties, thanks to which he gets the opportunity to act freely in the palace.
- Toub — scientist, creator of the Tutti the Heir's doll.
- August — an old clown from the Uncle Brizak's Carnival Wagon troupe.
- Auntie Ganimed — doctor Gaspar's housekeeper.
- Balloon Seller — a man who accidentally flew into the palace kitchen on his balloons.
