= Yury Olesha =

Russian author (1899–1960)

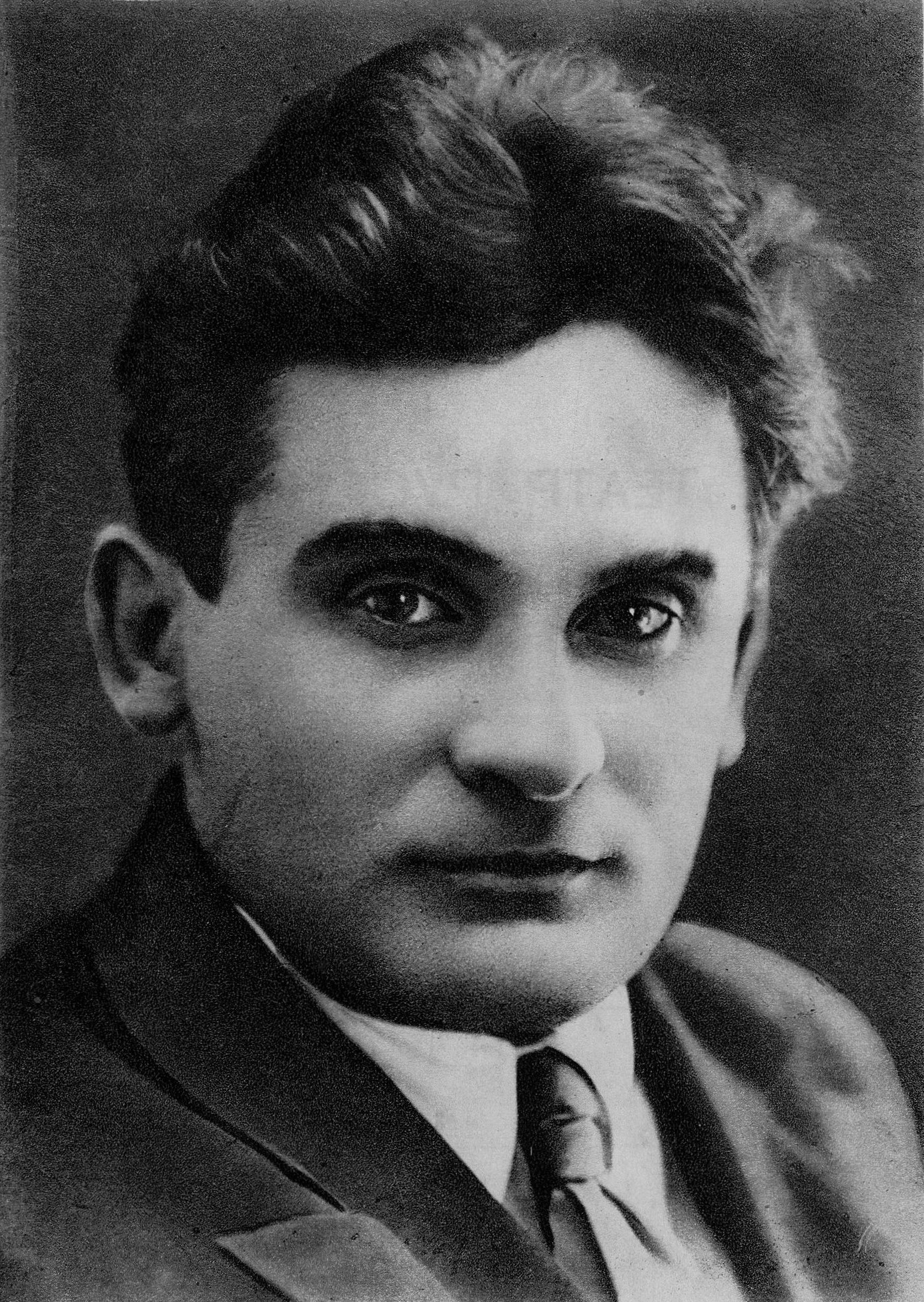
- Olesha in 1933
- Born: 3 March [O.S. 19 February] 1899; Elizavetgrad, Russian Empire (now Ukraine)
- Died: 10 May 1960 (aged 61); Moscow, USSR
- Resting place: Novodevichy Cemetery, Moscow
- Writing career
- Genres: Fiction, drama, poetry
- Notable works: Envy; Three Fat Men

Yury Karlovich Olesha (Russian: Ю́рий Ка́рлович Оле́ша, 3 March [O.S. 19 February] 1899 – 10 May 1960) was a Russian and Soviet novelist. He is considered one of the greatest Russian novelists of the 20th century, one of the few to have succeeded in writing works of lasting artistic value despite the stifling censorship of the era. His works are delicate balancing acts that superficially send pro-Communist messages but reveal far greater subtlety and richness upon a deeper reading. Sometimes, he is grouped with his friends Ilf and Petrov, Isaac Babel, and Sigismund Krzhizhanovsky into the Odessa School of Writers.

== Biography ==
Yuri Olesha was born on 3 March [O.S. 19 February] 1899 to Catholic parents of Polish descent in Elizavetgrad (now Kropyvnytskyi, Ukraine). Olesha's father, Karl Antonovich, was an impoverished landowner who later became a government inspector of alcohol and developed a proclivity for drinking and gambling. In 1902 Olesha and his family settled in Odessa, where Yuri would eventually meet many of his fellow writers such as Isaac Babel, Ilya Ilf, and Valentin Kataev, and ultimately maintain a lifelong friendship with the latter. As a student, Yuri demonstrated a knack for science but favored literature above his other subjects and began writing during the year before his graduation cum laude from high school. In 1917 Olesha entered law school but postponed his studies two years later to volunteer for the Red Army during the Civil War; during this time, Olesha began producing propaganda for the revolution.

Olesha's writing career began while he was involved with the literary group of young writers in Odessa called "The Green Lamp," which included not only Kataev and Olesha, but such influential writers as Eduard Bagritski and Dmitry Merezhkovsky. He also formed a close friendship with Isaac Babel. Olesha continued to produce propaganda materials for the revolution in Odessa and then in Kharkov, where he relocated in 1921. In 1922, Olesha published his first short story, "Angel," and moved to Moscow the same year to work at a popular railway worker's periodical called The Whistle. Here Olesha began writing featured satirical poetry under the pseudonym "Зубило" ("The Chisel"), eventually publishing two collections of poems in 1924 and 1927 before turning to prose writing and drama.

Olesha's literary debut would also become one of his most popular works: the novel Envy, which he published in 1927, follows five leading characters. Largely regarded as his greatest work, the novel thematically contrasts the old and new order, as well as individualism and collectivism, in Soviet Russia. During this period Olesha published another popular success: the fairy tale The Three Fat Men which he wrote in 1924 but did not publish until the year after his initial literary success. Olesha also wrote several short stories in the 1920s and 1930s, the most prominent of which are "Liompa" (1928), "The Cherry Stone" (1929), and "Natasha" (1936). In addition to prose fiction, Olesha also wrote for the stage, not only adapting his novel Envy for the theater in 1929 under the title Conspiracy of Feelings, but also writing an original play called A List of Assets in 1931 and dramatizing Dostoevsky's novel The Idiot later in life.

== "The Right to Despair" ==
In the 1930s and 1940s Olesha found it increasingly difficult to publish his work as a result of stringent Stalinist censorship. Speaking to the First Congress of Soviet Writers, he said that he could not write about workers and industrial production, as required of Soviet writers, because "it is difficult for me to understand the type of worker, the type of revolutionary hero. I can't be them."

Early in 1936, after Stalin had instigated a public attack on Dmitri Shostakovich, a report filed at the headquarters of the NKVD quoted Olesha as saying that the composer was "a brilliant, and a blow against Shostakovich is a calamity for art." He had written the script of a film A Severe Young Man, directed by Abram Room, which dealt with inequalities in Soviet society, but according to the same police report, he feared it would be banned because it was "many times more left-art than Shostakovich" The film was suppressed until the 1970s. In August 1936, he allowed himself to be pressured into signing a declaration calling for death sentences for the defendants at the first of the Moscow show trials, but when the praesidium of the writers' union discussed Boris Pasternak's refusal to sign a similar denunciation, Olesha defended him as "a perfectly soviet person".

When Isaac Babel was under arrest, in 1940, he told his interrogators that Olesha was practising "the right to despair"—by getting into a series of loud arguments in taverns. Despite continuing to write and edit, Olesha's career was stunted by his political environment, and on 10 May 1960 the author died of heart failure.

== See also ==
- Engineers of the human soul (the phrase attributed to Yuri Olesha)
